= List of Joshua Bassett concert tours =

Joshua Bassett concert tours
- Concert tours: 3

American singer and actor Joshua Bassett has headlined three concert tours. He embarked on his first tour in 2022, following the release of his first three extended plays: Joshua Bassett (2021), Crisis / Secret / Set Me Free (2021), and Sad Songs in a Hotel Room (2022), and a series of stand-alone singles. The tour was cut short and later rebranded as The Complicated Tour in 2023, which included the EP Different (2022). Bassett's third tour, The Golden Years Tour, took place from 2024 to 2025 to support his debut album of the same name.

== Concert tours ==
Title	Dates	Associated album	Continent(s)	Shows
Joshua Bassett's Tour	September 9 – October 17, 2022	—N/a	North America	5
The Complicated Tour	March 7 – May 10, 2023	—N/a	North America; Europe	35
The Golden Years Tour	July 30, 2024 – January 27, 2025	The Golden Years	North America; Europe	31

== Joshua Bassett's Tour (2022) ==
Joshua Bassett's Tour
- Tour by Joshua Bassett
- Location: Canada; United States
- Start date: September 9, 2022
- End date: October 17, 2022
- No. of shows: 5
- Supporting act: Lindsey Lomis

Joshua Bassett concert chronology
- Joshua Bassett's Tour (2022); The Complicated Tour (2023)

Joshua Bassett's Tour was the debut concert tour by American singer Joshua Bassett. The tour began on September 9, 2022, in Toronto, Ontario, and concluded on October 17, 2022 in Los Angeles, California.

Due to scheduling conflicts with the filming of High School Musical: The Musical: The Series, majority of the shows were cancelled but were later included in Bassett's Complicated Tour in 2023.

=== Background ===
After signing with Warner Records, Bassett released a series of stand-alone singles and four extended plays from 2020 to 2022. On May 16, 2022, Bassett announced that he would be embarking on his first concert tour that fall visiting North America and Europe, with Lindsey Lomis and Stacey Ryan serving as opening acts. Tickets went on sale days later on May 20.

On August 5, 2022, it was announced that many of the shows were either cancelled or rescheduled due to Bassett's "colliding production schedules."

=== Shows ===
List of shows
Date (2022)	City	Country	Venue	Supporting act	Ref.
September 9	Toronto	Canada	Axis Lounge	Lindsey Lomis	
September 12	New York City	United States	Bowery Ballroom	Lindsey Lomis	
September 13	New York City	United States	Bowery Ballroom	Lindsey Lomis	
October 16 (Note: Originally scheduled for September 22, 2022.)	Los Angeles	United States	Troubadour	Lindsey Lomis	
October 17 (Note: Originally scheduled for September 23, 2022.)	Los Angeles	United States	Troubadour	Lindsey Lomis	

==== Cancelled shows ====
Date (2022)	City	Country	Venue	Supporting act	Ref.
September 14	Boston	United States	Brighton Music Hall	Lindsey Lomis	
September 16	Washington, D.C.	United States	Union Stage	Lindsey Lomis	
September 17	Philadelphia	United States	Foundry	Lindsey Lomis	
September 19	Chicago	United States	Lincoln Hall	Lindsey Lomis	
September 24	San Francisco	United States	Great American Music Hall	Lindsey Lomis	
September 26	San Diego	United States	Music Box	Lindsey Lomis	
September 27	San Diego	United States	Music Box	Lindsey Lomis	
October 4	Paris	France	Les Etoiles	Stacey Ryan	
October 5	Amsterdam	The Netherlands	Tolhuistuin	Stacey Ryan	
October 7	Hamburg	Germany	Kent	Stacey Ryan	
October 9	Berlin	Germany	Frannz	Stacey Ryan	
October 11	London	England	O2 Academy Islington	Stacey Ryan	
October 12	London	England	O2 Academy Islington	Stacey Ryan	

== The Complicated Tour (2023) ==
The Complicated Tour
- Tour by Joshua Bassett
- Location: North America; Europe
- Start date: March 7, 2023
- End date: May 9, 2023
- No. of shows: 35
- Supporting acts: Lindsey Lomis; Stacey Ryan; Jenna Raine
- Producer: Live Nation

Joshua Bassett concert chronology
- Joshua Bassett's Tour (2022); The Complicated Tour (2023); The Golden Years Tour (2024–2025)

The Complicated Tour was the second concert tour by American singer Joshua Bassett. It began on March 7, 2023, in San Francisco, California, and concluded on May 9, 2023, in London, England.

=== Background ===
Bassett headlined his first concert tour in fall 2022. A month before its start, it was announced that majority of the shows were cancelled and rescheduled to 2023 due to scheduling conflicts. On December 12, 2022, Bassett formally announced the tour, with previous ticket holders receiving presale access. Lindsey Lomis and Stacey Ryan were announced as opening acts. Tickets went on sale on December 16.

=== Shows ===
List of shows
Date (2023)	City	Country	Venue	Supporting acts	Ref.
March 7	San Francisco	United States	The Fillmore	Lindsey Lomis	
March 8	San Francisco	United States	The Fillmore	Lindsey Lomis	
March 10	Seattle	United States	Neptune Theatre	Lindsey Lomis	
March 11	Vancouver	Canada	Centre in Vancouver	Lindsey Lomis	
March 12	Portland	United States	Roseland Theater	Lindsey Lomis	
March 14	Salt Lake City	United States	The Complex	Lindsey Lomis	
March 15	Denver	United States	The Summit	Lindsey Lomis	
March 17	Minneapolis	United States	The Fillmore Minneapolis	Lindsey Lomis	
March 18	Chicago	United States	House of Blues Chicago	Lindsey Lomis	
March 19	Detroit	United States	Saint Andrews Hall	Lindsey Lomis	
March 24	New York City	United States	Hammerstein Ballroom	Lindsey Lomis	
March 25	Boston	United States	Big Night Live	Lindsey Lomis	
March 26	Philadelphia	United States	The Theater of Living Arts	Lindsey Lomis	
March 28	Silver Spring	United States	The Fillmore Silver Spring	Lindsey Lomis	
March 29	Charlotte	United States	The Underground	Lindsey Lomis	
March 31	Nashville	United States	Marathon Music Works	Jenna Raine; Lindsey Lomis	
April 1	Atlanta	United States	Buckhead Theatre	Jenna Raine; Lindsey Lomis	
April 3	Houston	United States	House of Blues Houston	Jenna Raine; Lindsey Lomis	
April 4	Austin	United States	Emo’s Austin	Jenna Raine; Lindsey Lomis	
April 5	Dallas	United States	House of Blues Dallas	Jenna Raine; Lindsey Lomis	
April 8	Phoenix	United States	The Van Buren	Lindsey Lomis	
April 9	San Diego	United States	Observatory North Park	Lindsey Lomis	
April 11	Los Angeles	United States	The Wiltern	Jenna Raine; Lindsey Lomis	
April 12	Los Angeles	United States	The Wiltern	Jenna Raine; Lindsey Lomis	
April 25 (Note: Originally scheduled for March 21, 2023.)	Toronto	Canada	History	Jenna Raine	
April 28	Hamburg	Germany	Große Freiheit 36	Stacey Ryan	
April 29	Berlin	Germany	Huxleys Neue Welt	Stacey Ryan	
May 1	Amsterdam	The Netherlands	Paradiso	Stacey Ryan	
May 3	Cologne	Germany	Live Music Hall	Stacey Ryan	
May 4	Paris	France	Le Bataclan	Stacey Ryan	
May 6	Manchester	England	O2 Ritz Manchester	Stacey Ryan	
May 8	Glasgow	Scotland	SWG3 Galvanizers	Stacey Ryan	
May 9	London	England	O2 Forum Kentish Town	Jenna Raine; Stacey Ryan	
May 10	London	England	O2 Forum Kentish Town	Jenna Raine; Stacey Ryan	

== The Golden Years Tour (2024–2025) ==
The Golden Years Tour
- Tour by Joshua Bassett
- Location: North America; Europe
- Associated album: The Golden Years
- Start date: July 30, 2024
- End date: January 27, 2025
- Legs: 2
- No. of shows: 31
- Supporting act: Thomas Day

Joshua Bassett concert chronology
- The Complicated Tour (2023); The Golden Years Tour (2024–2025)

The Golden Years Tour was the third concert tour by American singer Joshua Bassett, in support of his debut studio album The Golden Years (2024). The tour began on July 30, 2024, in Phoenix, Arizona, and concluded on January 27, 2025, in Cologne, Germany.

=== Background ===
On June 7, 2024, Bassett announced that he would be going on tour in North America and Europe to support his then-upcoming debut studio album. Tickets went presale on June 11, with the general sale occurring on June 14. Thomas Day served as the opening act.

In September 2024, Bassett announced via Instagram that the European leg of the tour would be postponed to January 2025.

=== Setlist ===
This setlist is from the show in Phoenix on July 30, 2024. It does not represent all concerts for the duration of the tour.

1. "The Golden Years"
2. "Secret"
3. "Cherry Blossom"
4. "Circles"
5. "Biting My Tongue"
6. "Lie Lie Lie"
7. "Mirror"
8. "Lifeline"
9. "Different"
10. "Would Ya Tell Me"
11. "Little Rita"
12. "All In Due Time"
13. "Smoke Slow"
14. "Just Love"
15. "Feel Something"
16. "Dancing with Tears in My Eyes"
17. "Even When/The Best Part"
18. "Set Me Free"

Encore

19. "She Said He Said She Said"
20. "Look How Far You've Come"

=== Shows ===
List of 2024 shows
Date (2024)	City	Country	Venue	Supporting act	Ref.
July 30	Phoenix	United States	Arizona Financial Theatre	Thomas Day	
August 1	Irving	United States	Toyota Music Factory	Thomas Day	
August 2	Houston	United States	Bayou Music Center	Thomas Day	
August 3	Austin	United States	ACL Live	Thomas Day	
August 8	Atlanta	United States	Coca-Cola Roxy	Thomas Day	
August 9	Birmingham	United States	Avondale Brewing Company	Thomas Day	
August 10	Nashville	United States	Ryman Auditorium	Thomas Day	
August 12	Raleigh	United States	The Ritz	Thomas Day	
August 13	Charlotte	United States	The Fillmore Charlotte	Thomas Day	
August 14	Baltimore	United States	Pier Six Pavilion	Thomas Day	
August 16	Philadelphia	United States	The Met Philadelphia	Thomas Day	
August 17	Boston	United States	MGM Music Hall at Fenway	Thomas Day	
August 20	New York City	United States	Radio City Music Hall	Thomas Day	
August 21	Toronto	Canada	Massey Hall	Thomas Day	
August 23	Rochester Hills	United States	Meadow Brook Amphitheatre	Thomas Day	
August 24	Chicago	United States	Byline Bank Aragon Ballroom	Thomas Day	
August 25	Minneapolis	United States	The Fillmore Minneapolis	Thomas Day	
August 28	Salt Lake City	United States	Sandy Amphitheater	Thomas Day	
August 30	San Francisco	United States	Fox Theatre	Thomas Day	
September 1	San Diego	United States	CalCoast Credit Union Open Air Theatre	Thomas Day	
September 3	Inglewood	United States	YouTube Theater	Thomas Day	

List of 2025 shows
Date (2025)	City	Country	Venue	Supporting act	Ref.
January 13 (Note: Originally scheduled for September 16, 2024.)	Dublin	Ireland	3Olympia Theatre	Thomas Day	
January 15 (Note: Originally scheduled for September 19, 2024.)	Glasgow	Scotland	Galvanizers SWG3	Thomas Day	
January 16 (Note: Originally scheduled for September 22, 2024.)	Manchester	England	O2 Ritz Manchester	Thomas Day	
January 18 (Note: Originally scheduled for September 20, 2024.)	Birmingham	England	O2 Institute Birmingham	Thomas Day	
January 19 (Note: Originally scheduled for September 23, 2024.)	London	England	O2 Forum Kentish Town	Thomas Day	
January 21 (Note: Originally scheduled for September 25, 2024.)	Brussels	Belgium	La Madeleine	Thomas Day	
January 22 (Note: Originally scheduled for September 27, 2024.)	Amsterdam	The Netherlands	Melkweg	Thomas Day	
January 23	Amsterdam	The Netherlands	Melkweg	Thomas Day	
January 26 (Note: Originally scheduled for September 29, 2024.)	Paris	France	Salle Pleyel	Thomas Day	
January 27 (Note: Originally scheduled for October 6, 2024.)	Cologne	Germany	Carlswerk Victoria	Thomas Day	

==== Cancelled shows ====
Date (2024)	City	Country	Venue	Ref.
August 5	New Orleans	United States	House of Blues New Orleans	
August 6	Jacksonville	United States	Daily's Place	
August 27	Denver	United States	Fillmore Auditorium	
September 17	Belfast	Northern Ireland	Ulster Hall	
October 1	Barcelona	Spain	Razzmatazz	
October 3	Milan	Italy	Fabrique	
October 5	Munich	Germany	Muffathalle	
October 7	Berlin	Germany	Huxleys Neue Welt	
October 9	Copenhagen	Denmark	Vega	
