= Mark St. Cyr =

American actor (born 1987)

- Born: Mark Anthony St. Cyr; November 16, 1987 (age 39); Lafayette, Louisiana, U.S.
- Occupations: Actor; writer
- Years active: 2014–present
- Known for: High School Musical: The Musical: The Series as Benjamin Mazarra

Mark Anthony St. Cyr (born November 16, 1987) is an American actor from Louisiana. He is known for his role as Benjamin Mazarra in High School Musical: The Musical: The Series.

== Personal life ==
St. Cyr was born and raised in Lafayette, Louisiana. He graduated from Elon University with a Bachelor of Fine Arts in Acting. He has participated in the ABC Diversity Talent Showcase and he resides in New York.

== Filmography ==
=== Television ===
Year	Title	Role	Notes	Ref.
2025	Elsbeth	Ronan Gaines	Guest role	
2019	High School Musical: The Musical: The Series	Benjamin Mazzara	Supporting role	
2018	Chicago P.D.	Arthur Burton	guest role	
2017	Law & Order: Special Victims Unit	Jamal Turner	guest role	
2014	Person of Interest	Airport cop	guest role	

=== Film ===
Year	Title	Role	Notes	Ref.
TBA	Snare	TBA	Filming	
2022	The Menu	Dave Lorimer		
2022	Root Letter	Adam		
2021	John Doe	Mark		
2020	High School Musical: The Musical: The Holiday Special	Himself/Benjamin Mazarra	TV Movie special	
2020	Triple Threat	Caleb		
2019	The Housesitters	Eric		
2017	Going In Style	DJ	(uncredited)	
