= Joshua Bassett =

American actor and singer (born 2000)

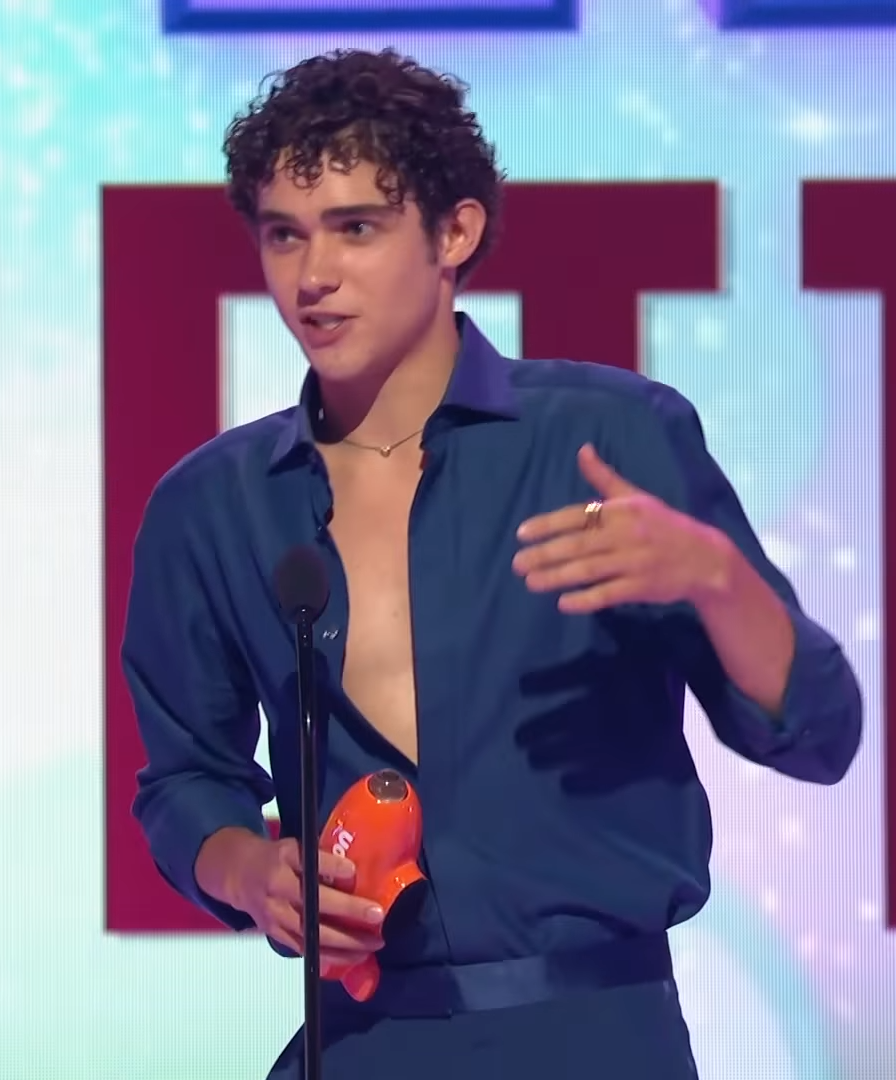
- Bassett in 2022
- Born: Joshua Taylor Bassett; December 22, 2000 (age 25); Oceanside, California, U.S.
- Occupations: Actor; singer
- Years active: 2015–present
- Musical career
- Genres: Pop rock; pop
- Instruments: Vocals; guitar; piano
- Labels: Warner; Plush; Cloverdale
- Website: www.joshuatbassett.com

Joshua Taylor Bassett (born December 22, 2000) is an American actor and singer. He began his career as a teen actor, appearing on the third season of Disney Channel family sitcom Stuck in the Middle (2018) as Aidan Peters. Bassett rose to prominence for his leading role as high school student Ricky Bowen in the Disney+ streaming series High School Musical: The Musical: The Series (2019–2023), and for its accompanying soundtracks, for which he was nominated for two Children's and Family Emmy Awards, winning in 2023. He also starred in Better Nate Than Ever and led the voice cast in Night at the Museum: Kahmunrah Rises Again (both 2022). In music, Bassett was signed to Warner Records in 2020 and subsequently released four extended plays. His debut album The Golden Years was released on July 26, 2024.

== Early life ==
Bassett was born and raised in Oceanside, California, to parents Taylor and Laura. He has five sisters and was home-schooled.

His first introduction to musical theater was at age eight, over a decade before he starred as Ricky in High School Musical: The Musical: The Series, when he was in a community theater production of High School Musical on Stage!. Since then, Bassett had starred in over 30 musical productions and "multiple commercials", before working in television. He moved to Los Angeles when he was 16 years old to start acting, living in his car for some time to get by.

== Career ==
=== 2017–2019: Breakthrough with High School Musical: The Musical: The Series ===
From 2017 to 2018, Bassett appeared in episodic roles in the television shows: Lethal Weapon, Game Shakers, and Dirty John. His first substantial role was in early 2018 as Aidan Peters in the third and final season of the Disney Channel comedy television series Stuck in the Middle. In August 2018, Bassett portrayed the role of Matt in a staged reading of the musical Calvin Berger. The production ran from August 10 through August 12 at the Hudson Backstage Theatre in Hollywood, California.

In October 2018, at age 17, Bassett was cast in his first major role, as the male lead Ricky Bowen: a "cynical but charming high school [student]", on Disney+'s mockumentary musical drama streaming television series High School Musical: The Musical: The Series, a spin-off of the High School Musical film series. In November 2019, the program debuted on Disney+. Both the series and his performance were met with positive reception. Shannon Miller of The A.V. Club praised Bassett for his talent, musical ability and "handling of dramatic material", while Kayla Cobb of Decider stated that he had significant romantic chemistry with the female lead Olivia Rodrigo; Megan Peters of ComicBook.com wrote that Bassett "[endears] fans with his plucky determination to do Troy justice". Bassett appeared in two specials related to the series. The first, High School Musical: The Musical: The Series: The Special, a documentary special, was released in December 2019. The second was a holiday special titled High School Musical: The Musical: The Holiday Special, released in December 2020; it featured his pre-release performance of original song "The Perfect Gift", and a cover of "Little Saint Nick" with co-star Matt Cornett. Bassett performed for the five soundtracks of the series. Additionally, he wrote and produced four original songs: he co-wrote the duet "Just for a Moment" with co-star Rodrigo for the first season's soundtrack, the holiday song "The Perfect Gift" for the second season and the holiday special's soundtrack, "Finally Free" for the third season, and "Speak Out", which he performed with Cornett, for the fourth soundtrack. High School Musical: The Musical: The Series ran for four seasons, ending in August 2023. Bassett won two Nickelodeon Kids' Choice Awards for his role and a Children's and Family Emmy Award for "Finally Free".

Bassett's other ventures in 2019 included: a guest role—as Linus, a recovering teenage drug addict—in the fifteenth season of the television series Grey's Anatomy, and being featured on "Evergreen", a track from American musician August Kamp's debut studio album, 19: The Musical.

=== 2020–2023: Musical debut and extended plays ===
In early 2020, Bassett signed with talent and entertainment company United Talent Agency, as well as signed a recording contract with Warner Bros. Records. after signing with Warner Bros. Records, He released his debut single, "Common Sense", on music platforms on April 3, 2020. Later that month, Bassett appeared in the television special, The Disney Family Singalong, in which he performed "We're All In This Together" from High School Musical alongside the film's cast as well as cast members from the Zombies and Descendants franchises. Bassett's second single, "Anyone Else", was released on July 16, 2020. In August 2020, he was a guest star participant on Nickelodeon's reality game series Unfiltered. In October 2020, in an interview, Bassett revealed that he had worked on his six track debut EP which would be released soon. That same month, he revealed in an interview with Good Morning America that his debut EP would be released in early 2021.

On January 14, 2021, Bassett released "Lie Lie Lie", the lead single from his then-upcoming debut EP, with a R3hab remix and an acoustic piano version released the following month. The song peaked in the top thirty on the US Bubbling Under Hot 100 and in the top ninety on the OOC UK Singles, becoming his first entry on both charts. Bassett had shared a snippet of the song on Instagram under the title, "I Know", back in late 2019 when the song had not entered production. He followed it up with the second single from his EP, "Only a Matter Of Time", released on January 28, 2021. In February 2021, Limbo, a short film that he had filmed back in 2015, was released on Amazon Prime Video and Vimeo on Demand. Despite the delayed release, the short film marked his film debut. Bassett played Caleb, an estranged young boy who reconnects with his father, the latter who is on a journey of self-reflection. Later that month, he revealed the track listing, cover art, and release date of his EP. On March 12, 2021, Bassett's self-titled debut EP was released. He wrote, co-produced five of six tracks in the record, and played six instruments throughout the body of work. The EP's subject matter centers on heartbreak, love, regret, and betrayal.

In April 2021, he conducted a one-night virtual concert titled "A Night with Joshua Bassett", in which he performed ten songs, including an unreleased song titled "LA", and a cover of "Drops of Jupiter", backed by a full band from EastWest Studios in Los Angeles. The virtual concert was broadcast live on his website, while tickets were up for sale on his merchandise store. It was also recorded and later released as a concert film on Prime Video, iTunes, Vudu, and Microsoft Movies & TV. In May 2021, Bassett released a single titled "Feel Something". He co-directed the music video for the song with fellow creative specialist Sarah Carpenter. In October 2021, Billboard placed Bassett in its Billboard 21 Under 21 list, which represented rising artists in the music industry under the age of 21. In December 2021, he released his second EP that consisted of a trio of singles, titled "Set Me Free", "Crisis", and "Secret". The EP was titled after the three songs; Bassett served as a co-creative director for the music videos of the songs.

In February 2022, Bassett released a single titled "Doppelgänger", co-directing the music video for the song with YouTuber and fellow creative Elle Mills. He co-starred along with actor and dancer Ciara Riley Wilson and social media personality Chelsey Amaro in the music video. In April 2022, Bassett starred in a supporting role as Anthony, the protagonist's older brother, in the Disney+ original musical comedy film Better Nate Than Ever, directed and written by Tim Federle and based on his 2013 novel of the same name. The film received generally positive reviews. TJ O'Connell stated that his performance as Anthony "truly brings so much emotional weight to this movie. He represents that approval we need that we think is out of reach." while Joshua Axelrod of Pittsburgh Post-Gazette wrote that Bassett "sells Anthony's growth as he finally begins to understand his little brother". In May 2022, Bassett announced his eponymous debut concert tour featuring stops in the United States, Canada, and Europe. In July 2022, he appeared as a contestant on the ninth season of Celebrity Family Feud, playing for the nonprofit organization, Make-A-Wish, along with other High School Musical: The Musical: The Series cast members.

=== 2024–present: The Golden Years, off-Broadway and autobiography ===
On May 17, 2024, Bassett released "The Golden Years", which served as the lead single from his debut album The Golden Years. The album was announced the same day. Bassett embarked on the Golden Years Tour, from July 2024 to January 2025 to support the album, visiting North America and Europe. In July 2025, he signed with Plush Management and released his sophomore album's lead single "Blue", under their in-house label two months later. Bassett's sophomore album, Easier, was released on August 14, 2026. On October 2, 2026, the single "Voodoo Doll" was released under Cloverdale Records.

Bassett made his off-Broadway debut as Seymour in the musical Little Shop of Horrors from December 2025 to March 2026. In January 2026, he led an industry reading (as Dion) of the Broadway-bound jukebox musical, The Wanderer in New York City, along with Olivia Holt (as Dion's wife Susan), Diego Andres Rodriguez (as Johnny), Tommy Bracco, Sarah Daniels, Morgan Dudley and Johnny Tammaro.

His first book, an autobiography titled Rookie: My Public, Private, and Secret Life, was released in May 2026. The book debuted at number ten on The New York Times Bestseller list for Hardcover Nonfiction. The book also debuted at number thirteen on the Publishers Weekly Bestsellers List selling 5,888 units in its first week.

== Other activities ==
=== Endorsements ===
In March 2022, Bassett fronted the spring campaign, "Member's Always: Future Together", for clothing retailer American Eagle, alongside Madelyn Cline, Maitreyi Ramakrishnan, Michael Evans Behling, Coco Gauff, and Mxmtoon.

=== Philanthropy ===
In January 2021, Bassett opened his online merchandise store, donating 100% of his proceeds from the merchandise to charity. Current charities that his merchandise store supports include Bring Change to Mind, Teen Line, and Sunrise Movement. Other charities that Bassett's merchandise store has supported include Court Appointed Special Advocates, Jack.org, The Young Feminist Fund, and A Long Walk Home.

Bassett donated 100% of his proceeds from his song "Crisis", the lead single from his December 2021 EP Crisis / Secret / Set Me Free, to mental health organizations. In addition, Bassett donated one dollar for every pre-save of said EP to mental health organizations, raising over twenty thousand dollars. Additionally, Bassett donated a portion of every VIP ticket for his upcoming American/European tour to a charity of the buyer's choice.

In March 2022, Bassett was selected to be an ambassador for the American Eagle "Members Always: Future Together" philanthropic campaign. Through this initiative, the brand awarded $200,000 in grants to twenty young people igniting change in their communities. For Mental Health Awareness Month, through the program, Bassett partnered with mental health awareness nonprofit organization Bring Change to Mind and was a speaker on mental health to local LA high school students at the organization's SoCal Summit.

In August 2022, Bassett was included on the Variety Power of Young Hollywood Impact List and invited to a gala hosted in partnership with Facebook Gaming. As part of the event, Bassett competed in a charity gaming tournament where each impact list honoree chose a charity of their choice to donate all their winnings to. Bassett's team chose to support Planned Parenthood. They ended up winning the tournament and donating $10,000 to Planned Parenthood.

In September 2022, Bassett released his third EP, Sad Songs in a Hotel Room. The second single of the project, "Lifeline", was a song dedicated to his mother, who was by his side while he was deathly ill in 2021. Bassett donated 100% of the proceeds for "Lifeline" to "organizations that are a lifeline for others". In addition, with the release of the single, he announced that he was creating an organization called "Find My Lifeline", a haven to provide people with support and lifelines for those who may not have a friend or family member to turn to.

In June 2023, Bassett started an initiative called "Sammy Sundays". He, along with friends and family, have worked to create care packages with hygiene and menstrual products, food, clothes, and other essential goods to give to the homeless community in Los Angeles. These care packages have been distributed every Sunday.

== Personal life ==
Bassett sings and plays piano, guitar, ukulele, bass, drums, and some saxophone. In 2020, he showed support for Black Lives Matter, appearing at a protest in Los Angeles with actress Clara Sanders as well as singer and then-girlfriend Sabrina Carpenter.

On May 10, 2021, he came out as a member of the LGBTQ+ community during an interview.

In January 2021, Bassett became seriously ill and was hospitalized with septic shock and heart failure: "[The doctors] told me that I had a 30% chance of survival. They told me that if I had not checked into the hospital within 12 hours, I would have been found [dead] in my apartment."

In August 2021, Bassett revealed in an interview that he had dealt with negative body image issues that developed into "serious problems" around the time the first season of High School Musical: The Musical: The Series was airing. In Rookie: My Public, Private, and Secret Life, this was revealed to be an eating disorder involving bingeing and purging. In December 2021, Bassett stated that he was routinely abused in his childhood by a family member and in his adolescence by a different unnamed older man.

== Discography ==
=== Studio albums ===
List of studio albums, with release date and label shown
Title	Album details
The Golden Years	Released: July 26, 2024; Label: Warner; Format: CD, digital download, streaming
Easier	Released: August 14, 2026; Label: Plush Records; Format: Digital download, streaming

=== Compilation albums ===
List of compilation albums, with release date and label shown
Title	Details
Best of High School Musical: The Musical: The Series	Released: August 20, 2021; Label: Walt Disney; Format: Digital download, streaming

=== Soundtrack albums ===
List of soundtrack albums, with selected chart positions, certifications, release date and label shown
Title	Album details	Peak chart positions		Certifications
Title	Album details	US	CAN	Certifications
High School Musical: The Musical: The Series: The Soundtrack	Released: January 10, 2020; Label: Walt Disney; Format: CD, digital download, streaming	31	38	RIAA: Gold
High School Musical: The Musical: The Holiday Special: The Soundtrack	Released: November 20, 2020; Label: Walt Disney; Format: Digital download, streaming	—	—	
High School Musical: The Musical: The Series: The Soundtrack: Season 2	Released: July 30, 2021; Label: Walt Disney; Format: CD, digital download, streaming	58	23	
High School Musical: The Musical: The Series: The Soundtrack: Season 3	Released: September 16, 2022; Label: Walt Disney; Format: Digital download, streaming	—	—	
High School Musical: The Musical: The Series: The Soundtrack: The Final Season	Released: August 9, 2023; Label: Walt Disney; Format: Digital download, streaming	—	—	
"—" denotes a recording that did not chart or was not released.

=== Extended plays ===
List of extended plays, with selected chart positions, release date and label shown
Title	Details	Peak chart positions	
Title	Details	US Heat.	UK Down.
Joshua Bassett	Release: March 12, 2021; Label: Warner; Format: Digital download, streaming	19	67
Crisis / Secret / Set Me Free	Release: December 3, 2021; Label: Warner; Format: Digital download, streaming	—	—
Sad Songs in a Hotel Room	Release: September 23, 2022; Label: Warner; Format: LP, digital download, streaming	—	81
Different	Release: October 27, 2022; Label: Warner; Format: Digital download, streaming	—	—
"—" denotes a recording that did not chart or was not released.

=== Singles ===
==== As lead artist ====
List of singles as lead artist, with year released, selected chart positions and album name shown
Title	Year	Peak chart positions				Album
Title	Year	US Bub.	IRE	NZ Hot	UK	Album
"Common Sense"	2020	—	—	—	—	Non-album singles
"Anyone Else"	2020	—	—	—	—	Non-album singles
"Lie Lie Lie"	2021	25	44	11	98	Joshua Bassett
"Only a Matter of Time"	2021	—	—	—	—	Joshua Bassett
"Telling Myself"	2021	—	—	—	—	Joshua Bassett
"Feel Something"	2021	—	—	39	—	Non-album single
"Crisis"	2021	—	96	17	—	Crisis / Secret / Set Me Free
"Secret"	2021	—	—	24	—	Crisis / Secret / Set Me Free
"Set Me Free"	2021	—	98	14	—	Crisis / Secret / Set Me Free
"Doppelgänger"	2022	—	—	31	—	Non-album single
"Smoke Slow"	2022	—	—	—	—	Sad Songs in a Hotel Room
"Lifeline"	2022	—	—	—	—	Sad Songs in a Hotel Room
"Sad Songs in a Hotel Room"	2022	—	—	—	—	Sad Songs in a Hotel Room
"Would You Love Me Now?"	2022	—	—	—	—	Different
"She Said He Said She Said"	2022	—	—	—	—	Different
"I'm Sorry"	2022	—	—	—	—	Different
"Different"	2022	—	—	—	—	Different
"Just Love"	2023	—	—	—	—	Non-album single
"The Golden Years"	2024	—	—	—	—	The Golden Years
"Dancing with Tears in My Eyes"	2024	—	—	—	—	The Golden Years
"Blue"	2025	—	—	—	—	Easier
"Clouds"	2026	—	—	—	—	Easier
"Hold Me"	2026	—	—	—	—	Easier
"Easier"	2026	—	—	—	—	Easier
"Dancing on the Edge"	2026	—	—	—	—	Easier
"Voodoo Doll"	2026	—	—	—	—	Non-album single
"—" denotes a recording that did not chart or was not released.

==== Promotional singles ====
List of promotional singles, with year released, selected chart positions and album name shown
Title	Year	Peak chart positions	Album
Title	Year	NZ Hot	Album
"I Think I Kinda, You Know" (with Olivia Rodrigo)	2019	—	High School Musical: The Musical: The Series: The Soundtrack
"Just for a Moment" (with Olivia Rodrigo)	2020	32	High School Musical: The Musical: The Series: The Soundtrack
"Even When/The Best Part" (with Olivia Rodrigo)	2021	33	High School Musical: The Musical: The Series: The Soundtrack: Season 2
"The Perfect Gift"	2021	—	High School Musical: The Musical: The Series: The Soundtrack: Season 2
"Bet On It"	2021	—	High School Musical: The Musical: The Series: The Soundtrack: Season 2
"Even When"	2021	—	High School Musical: The Musical: The Series: The Soundtrack: Season 2
"Let You Go"	2021	40	High School Musical: The Musical: The Series: The Soundtrack: Season 2
"In a Heartbeat" (Frankie A. Rodriguez featuring Joshua Bassett)	2021	—	High School Musical: The Musical: The Series: The Soundtrack: Season 2
"Finally Free"	2022	—	High School Musical: The Musical: The Series: The Soundtrack: Season 3
"—" denotes items which failed to chart.

=== Guest appearances ===
List of guest appearances, with year released, other performing artists, and album name shown
Title	Year	Other artist(s)	Album
"Evergreen"	2019	August Kamp	19: The Musical

== Tours ==
=== Headlining ===
- Joshua Bassett's Tour (2022)
- The Complicated Tour (2023)
- The Golden Years Tour (2024–2025)

== Filmography ==
=== Television ===
Year	Title	Role	Notes	Ref.
2017	Lethal Weapon	Will	Episode: "Flight Risk"	
2018	Game Shakers	Brock	Episode: "Babe & The Boys"	
2018	Dirty John	John Meehan	Episode: "Lord High Executioner"	
2018	Stuck in the Middle	Aidan Peters	Recurring role (season 3)	
2019	Grey's Anatomy	Linus	Episodes: "Girlfriend in a Coma", "I Want a New Drug"	
2019–2023	High School Musical: The Musical: The Series	Ricky Bowen	Main role; streaming television series	
2019	High School Musical: The Musical: The Series: The Special	Himself / Ricky Bowen	Documentary special	
2020	The Disney Family Singalong	Himself	Television special	
2020	Nickelodeon's Unfiltered	Himself	Episode: "It's Raining Penguins!"	
2020	Earth to Ned	Himself	Episode: "Ned: The Musical"	
2020	High School Musical: The Musical: The Holiday Special	Himself / Ricky Bowen	Holiday special	
2022	Celebrity Family Feud	Himself	Contestant (season 9: episode 3)	

=== Film ===
Year	Title	Role	Notes	Ref.
2021	Limbo	Caleb	Short film	
2021	A Night With Joshua Bassett	Himself	Direct-to-video concert film	
2022	Better Nate Than Ever	Anthony Foster	Streaming film	
2022	Night at the Museum: Kahmunrah Rises Again	Nick Daley	Voice role	
2026	I Can Only Imagine 2	Christopher	Deleted scenes	

== Stage ==
Year	Title	Role	Venue	Notes	Ref.
2018	Calvin Berger	Matt	Hudson Backstage Theatre, Hollywood	Staged reading	
2025–2026	Little Shop of Horrors	Seymour Krelborn	Westside Theatre	Off-Broadway	
2026	The Wanderer	Dion	New York City	Industry reading	

== Bibliography ==
- Rookie: My Public, Private, and Secret Life (2026)

== Awards and nominations ==
Award	Year	Category	Nominated work	Result	Ref.
Children's and Family Emmy Awards	2023	Outstanding Original Song for a Children's or Young Teen Program	"Finally Free" (as co-writer and co-producer; from High School Musical: The Musical: The Series)	Won	
Children's and Family Emmy Awards	2024	Outstanding Original Song for a Children's or Young Teen Program	"Speak Out" (as co-writer and co-producer; from High School Musical: The Musical: The Series)	Nominated	
Kids' Choice Awards	2020	Favorite Male TV Star	High School Musical: The Musical: The Series	Nominated	
Kids' Choice Awards	2021	Favorite Male TV Star	High School Musical: The Musical: The Series	Nominated	
Kids' Choice Awards	2022	Favorite Male TV Star (Kids)	High School Musical: The Musical: The Series	Won	
Kids' Choice Awards	2023	Favorite Male TV Star (Kids)	High School Musical: The Musical: The Series	Won	
Kids' Choice Awards	2024	Favorite Male TV Star (Kids)	High School Musical: The Musical: The Series	Nominated	

=== Listicles ===
Name of publisher, name of listicle, year(s) listed, and placement result
Publisher	Year	Listicle	Placement	Ref.
Billboard	2021	21 Under 21	Placed	
