= Crisis / Secret / Set Me Free =

2021 EP by Joshua Bassett

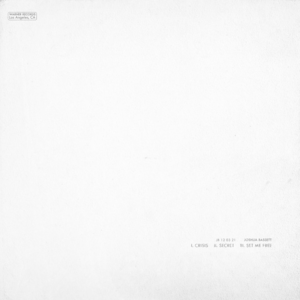

EP by Joshua Bassett
- Released: December 3, 2021
- Recorded: 2021
- Length: 10:24
- Label: Warner
- Producers: Davis Naish; Mikey Reaves

Joshua Bassett chronology
Joshua Bassett (2021)	Crisis / Secret / Set Me Free (2021)	Sad Songs in a Hotel Room (2022)

Singles from Crisis / Secret / Set Me Free
- 1. "Crisis" Released: December 3, 2021; 2. "Secret" Released: December 3, 2021; 3. "Set Me Free" Released: December 3, 2021

Crisis / Secret / Set Me Free is the second EP by American singer-songwriter Joshua Bassett, released on December 3, 2021, through Warner Records. The songs reflect the singer's personal life experiences with lyrics expressing his feelings during hard times.

The three songs were accompanied by their music videos, all released on the same day as the EP.

== Background and conception ==
Bassett rose to mainstream recognition for his role as Ricky Bowen in Disney+'s mockumentary musical drama series High School Musical: The Musical: The Series (2019–2023); he also performed, wrote, and produced music for the program. In 2020, he signed with Warner Records. Following the release of his self-titled debut extended play in March 2021, Bassett released three more EPs and several singles in 2022 and 2023.

Bassett donated 100% of his proceeds from his song "Crisis", the lead single from his December 2021 EP Crisis / Secret / Set Me Free, to mental health organizations. In addition, Bassett donated one dollar for every pre-save of said EP to mental health organizations, raising over twenty thousand dollars. Additionally, Bassett donated a portion of every VIP ticket for his upcoming American/European tour to a charity of the buyer's choice.

== Release ==
The singer released the three songs, along with their music videos on December 3, 2021. Upon the release of the EP, Bassett expressed his desire for fans to "treat everyone with respect and love", writing that "anyone who sends hate on my ‘behalf’ is no fan of mine". He further explained that the songs represent a dark period of is life, that led to an immense personal growth.

== Critical reception ==
The album received a positive review from People, with Daniela Avila complimenting Bassett's abilities as a songwriter, the personal nature of the songs and their emotional weight.

== Track listing ==
Crisis / Secret / Set Me Free track listing
No.	Title	Writer(s)	Producer(s)	Length
1.	"Crisis"	Joshua Bassett; Derrick Southerland; Mikey Reaves	Reaves	3:09
2.	"Secret"	Bassett; Davis Naish; Katelyn Tarver	Naish	3:12
3.	"Set Me Free"	Bassett; Naish; Tarver	Naish	4:02
Total length:				10:24

== Personnel ==
Credits adapted from Tidal.

=== Musicians ===
- Joshua Bassett – vocals (all tracks), background vocals (2–3), piano (2)
- Tom Lombardo – acoustic guitar (1)
- Aaron Sterling – drums (all tracks), programming (1)
- Ian Fitchuk – keyboards (1)
- David Naish – acoustic guitar (2–3), background vocals (2–3), bass (2–3), electric guitar (2–3), keyboards (2–3), percussion (2–3), piano (2–3), programming (2–3)
- Katelyn Tarver – background vocals (2–3)
- Cara Fox – cello (3)
- Eleonore Denig – violin (3)

=== Technical ===
- Dale Becker – mastering (all tracks)
- Michael Freeman – mixing (2–3)
- Katie Harvey – engineering (all tracks)
- Noah McCorkle – engineering (all tracks)

== Release history ==
Release history and formats for Crisis / Secret / Set Me Free
Region	Date	Format(s)	Label	Ref.
Various	December 3, 2021	Digital download; streaming	Warner	
