= High School Musical: The Musical: The Series: The Soundtrack: Season 3 =

TV series soundtrack album

Soundtrack album by Cast of High School Musical: The Musical: The Series
- Released: September 15, 2022
- Recorded: December 2021–April 2022
- Genres: Pop; teen pop; musical theatre
- Length: 1:02:30
- Label: Walt Disney

High School Musical chronology
High School Musical: The Musical: The Series: The Soundtrack: Season 2 (2021)	High School Musical: The Musical: The Series: The Soundtrack: Season 3 (2022)	High School Musical: The Musical: The Series: The Soundtrack: The Final Season (2023)

High School Musical: The Musical: The Series: The Soundtrack: Season 3 is the soundtrack album for the third season of the streaming television series High School Musical: The Musical: The Series, which was released one day after the third-season finale on September 15, 2022, by Walt Disney Records. The soundtrack for the season contains original songs, as well as songs from the films High School Musical 2, Camp Rock and Camp Rock 2: The Final Jam, and the stage adaptation of the 2013 film Frozen.

== Background ==
In September 2021, High School Musical: The Musical: The Series was renewed for a third season, despite fan speculation that it would not. Despite speculation that it would center around the Disney Channel Original Movie Camp Rock, in November of that year, it was confirmed that the musical would be the stage adaptation of the 2013 film Frozen.

== Composition ==
The soundtrack features new recordings of songs from the film High School Musical 2; "What Time Is It?," a full recording of "Fabulous" (a portion of this song was used in a medley of songs from High School Musical 2 in the second season) and "Everyday". Also featured are songs from the Camp Rock film series; "Start the Party," "It's On," "Wouldn't Change a Thing," and "This Is Me." Finally, songs from the stage adaptation of Frozen are included: "For the First Time in Forever," "Do You Want to Build a Snowman?," "Love Is an Open Door," "A Little Bit of You," "What Do You Know About Love?," "In Summer," "Let It Go," and "Kristoff Lullaby," all by husband-wife duo Robert Lopez and Kristen Anderson-Lopez.

Recurring guest star Corbin Bleu contributes to two numbers: a duet with star Sofia Wylie on the original song "Different Way to Dance," and with the entire cast on "Everyday." On collaborating with Wylie on "Different Way to Dance," Bleu noted Wylie's talent and pushed to work with her, adding he was "moved to see another person of color" at the center of the franchise. In response, Wylie stated that working with Blue was "truly a pinch-me moment...I just loved him and I loved his talent and who he was as a person." Series regulars Kate Reinders and Larry Saperstein, who recurred and guest starred in the third season respectively, also contribute to "Everyday." Recurring star Meg Donnelly contributes to the song "It's On."

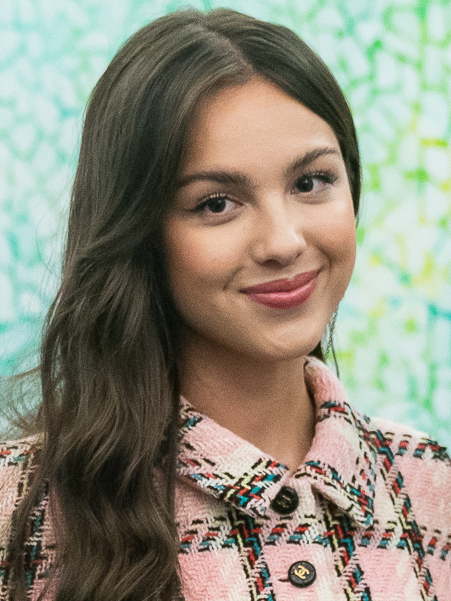
Former series star Olivia Rodrigo (pictured here in 2021) gave her final musical performance to the series, a song titled "You Never Know".

Star Joshua Bassett once again contributed to an original song; along with Doug Rockwell and Tova Litvin, he co-wrote the song "Finally Free." On writing "Finally Free", Bassett recalled that "...as soon as [showrunner Tim Federle] got in the Zoom call, I heard melody and immediate lyrics and immediately I was like, well, that's gotta be it." Star Dara Reneé also co-wrote a song, "Here I Come," with writers Steph Jones and Anthony M. Jones. Reneé has stated that "Here I Come" was written in response to her anxiety. Former star Olivia Rodrigo exited the series after the third season following a guest role, and gave her final musical performance to the series, an original song titled "You Never Know."

== Singles ==
Prior to the first episode's premiere, the group song "It's On" was released on July 8, 2022.

In the lead-up to the album's release, each song was released as a single to correlate with the episodes being distributed and all music videos were released individually on the DisneyMusicVEVO YouTube channel as well as the individual artists' channels. "What Time Is It/Start the Party Mashup," "Finally Free," and "Shallow Lake" were released on the same date as the third season's debut on July 27, 2022. On August 3, "Balance," "For the First Time in Forever/Do You Want to Build a Snowman? Mashup," "For the First Time in Forever," and "You Never Know" were released. "Ballad of Susan Fine" and "Rising" were released on August 10. "Fabulous" and "Love Is An Open Door" were released on August 17. "A Little Bit of You," "What Do You Know About Love?," and "Right Place" were released on August 24.

"It's On" appeared in the sixth episode, and was released again alongside "Different Way to Dance" on August 31. On September 7, "Wouldn't Change a Thing" and "Here I Come" were released. The remaining songs used in the season: "This Is Me," "In Summer," "Let It Go," "Kristoff Lullaby," and "Everyday," along with a remix of "Right Place" featuring Joshua Bassett, were released in tandem with the full soundtrack's release on September 15.

== Release and promotion ==
The soundtrack was released digitally on all music streaming services on September 15, 2022, and physically at Target the following day.

== Reception ==
Diego Paralta of Cultured Vultures said of the music, "the show doesn't disappoint. The singing and dancing isn't designed to look spectacular, but...the groove of the soundtrack knows what you like by now." However, in a more mixed review of the music, The Oakland Post's D'Juanna Lester criticized the need to turn classic Disney songs into pop songs, adding: "They turned so many of their songs into auto tuned tracks that took me out of the story. This cast is super talented — there was no need to add all these extra things to the songs. Just let them sing...[though "Here I Come"] broke me."

== Charts ==
Chart performance for High School Musical: The Musical: The Series: The Soundtrack: Season 3
Chart (2022)	Peak position
UK Compilation Albums (OCC)	53

== Track listing ==
Credits adapted from Tidal.

High School Musical: The Musical: The Series: The Soundtrack: Season 3 track listing
No.	Title	Writer(s)	Performer(s)	Length
1.	"What Time Is It/Start the Party Mashup"	Matthew Gerrard; Robbie Nevil	Cast of High School Musical: The Musical: The Series	2:23
2.	"Finally Free"	Joshua Bassett; Doug Rockwell; Tova Litvin	Bassett	3:17
3.	"Shallow Lake"	Gabriel Mann; Jeannie Lurie	Cast of High School Musical: The Musical: The Series	1:22
4.	"Balance"	Bekah Novi; Jordan Powers; Jason Mater	Sofia Wylie	2:28
5.	"For the First Time in Forever/Do You Want to Build a Snowman? Mashup"	Robert Lopez; Kristen Anderson-Lopez	Cast of High School Musical: The Musical: The Series	3:02
6.	"For the First Time in Forever"	Lopez; Anderson-Lopez	Adrian Lyles	1:20
7.	"You Never Know"	Chantry Johnson; Mitch Allan; Michelle Zarlenga	Olivia Rodrigo	3:16
8.	"Ballad of Susan Fine"	Jamie Houston	Cast of High School Musical: The Musical: The Series	2:12
9.	"Rising"	Cozi Zuehlsdorff; Matthew Tishler	Julia Lester	3:25
10.	"Fabulous"	Faye Greenberg; David Lawrence	Cast of High School Musical: The Musical; The Series	3:03
11.	"Love Is an Open Door"	Lopez; Anderson-Lopez	Wylie; Matt Cornett	1:50
12.	"A Little Bit of You"	Lopez; Anderson-Lopez	Liamani Segura; Aria Brooks	1:39
13.	"What Do You Know About Love?"	Lopez; Anderson-Lopez	Bassett; Wylie	2:53
14.	"Right Place"	Mater; William Behlendorf; Brandon C. Rogers	Lyles	2:34
15.	"Different Way to Dance"	Mater; Behlendorf; Rogers	Wylie; Corbin Bleu	2:32
16.	"It's On"	Kovasciar Myvette; Lyrica Anderson; Toby Gad	Meg Donnelly; Cast of High School Musical: The Musical: The Series	3:03
17.	"Wouldn't Change a Thing"	Adam Anders; Peer Åström; Nicole Hassman	Lyles; Saylor Bell Curda; Joe Serafini; Frankie A. Rodriguez	2:52
18.	"Here I Come"	Dara Reneé; Steph Jones; Anthony M. Jones	Reneé	3:17
19.	"This Is Me"	Andy Dodd; Adam Watts	Segura	3:04
20.	"In Summer"	Lopez; Anderson-Lopez	Rodriguez; Bassett; Wylie	1:56
21.	"Let It Go"	Lopez; Anderson-Lopez	Reneé	3:48
22.	"Kristoff Lullaby"	Lopez; Anderson-Lopez	Bassett	1:43
23.	"Everyday"	Houston	Bleu; Larry Saperstein; Kate Reinders; Cast of High School Musical: The Musical: The Series	2:19
24.	"Right Place" (featuring Joshua Bassett)	Mater; Behlendorf; Rogers	Lyles; Bassett	3:02
Total length:				1:02:30
