= Disney's Magic Bake-Off =

- Official release poster
- Genre: Baking; Competition
- Presented by: Issac Ryan Brown; Dara Reneé
- Country of origin: United States
- Original language: English
- No. of seasons: 1
- No. of episodes: 12

Production
- Running time: 52 minutes
- Production company: Tastemade

Original release
- Network: Disney Channel
- Release: August 13 – December 3, 2021

Disney's Magic Bake-Off is an American baking competition television series produced in partnership with Tastemade, that aired on Disney Channel from August 13 to December 3, 2021. The series is hosted by Issac Ryan Brown and Dara Reneé.

== Premise ==
Three teams of two bakers (between the ages of 6-14) compete to bake the best cake inspired by Disney films and series, with Issac Ryan Brown and Dara Reneé hosting the program. Disneyland pastry sous chef, Graciela Gomez judges each teams' cake. The winning team receives a personalized video recipe of their cake, a deluxe baking set, and a trophy.

== Production ==
On April 27, 2021, it was announced that Disney Channel had partnered up with Tastemade to create a new baking competition series, Disney's Magic Bake-Off. Issac Ryan Brown and Dara Reneé were set to host the series. Production was underway with an expected premiere in summer 2021. On June 25, 2021, it was announced that the series would premiere on August 13, 2021.

== Episodes ==
| No. | Title | Original release date | Prod. code | U.S. viewers (millions) |
|---|---|---|---|---|
| 1 | "Descendants" | August 13, 2021 | 101 | 0.47 |
| 2 | "Disney Theme Parks" | August 20, 2021 | 103 | 0.29 |
| 3 | "Princesses" | August 27, 2021 | 102 | 0.37 |
| 4 | "Bunk'd" | September 3, 2021 | 106 | 0.31 |
| 5 | "The Lion King" | September 10, 2021 | 107 | 0.22 |
| 6 | "Toy Story" | September 17, 2021 | 108 | 0.27 |
| 7 | "Frozen" | September 24, 2021 | 109 | 0.21 |
| 8 | "Zombies" | October 8, 2021 | 104 | 0.21 |
| 9 | "Big City Greens" | October 15, 2021 | 110 | 0.22 |
| 10 | "Star Wars" | October 22, 2021 | 111 | 0.18 |
| 11 | "Mickey's Birthday" | November 12, 2021 | 112 | 0.23 |
| 12 | "Holiday" | December 3, 2021 | 105 | 0.30 |

== Ratings ==
Viewership and ratings per season of Disney's Magic Bake-Off
| Season | Episodes | First aired | | Last aired | | Avg. viewers (millions) |
| Season | Episodes | Date | Viewers (millions) | Date | Viewers (millions) | Avg. viewers (millions) |
|---|---|---|---|---|---|---|
| 1 | 12 | August 13, 2021 | 0.47 | December 3, 2021 | 0.30 | 0.27 |
