= Dara Reneé =

American actress

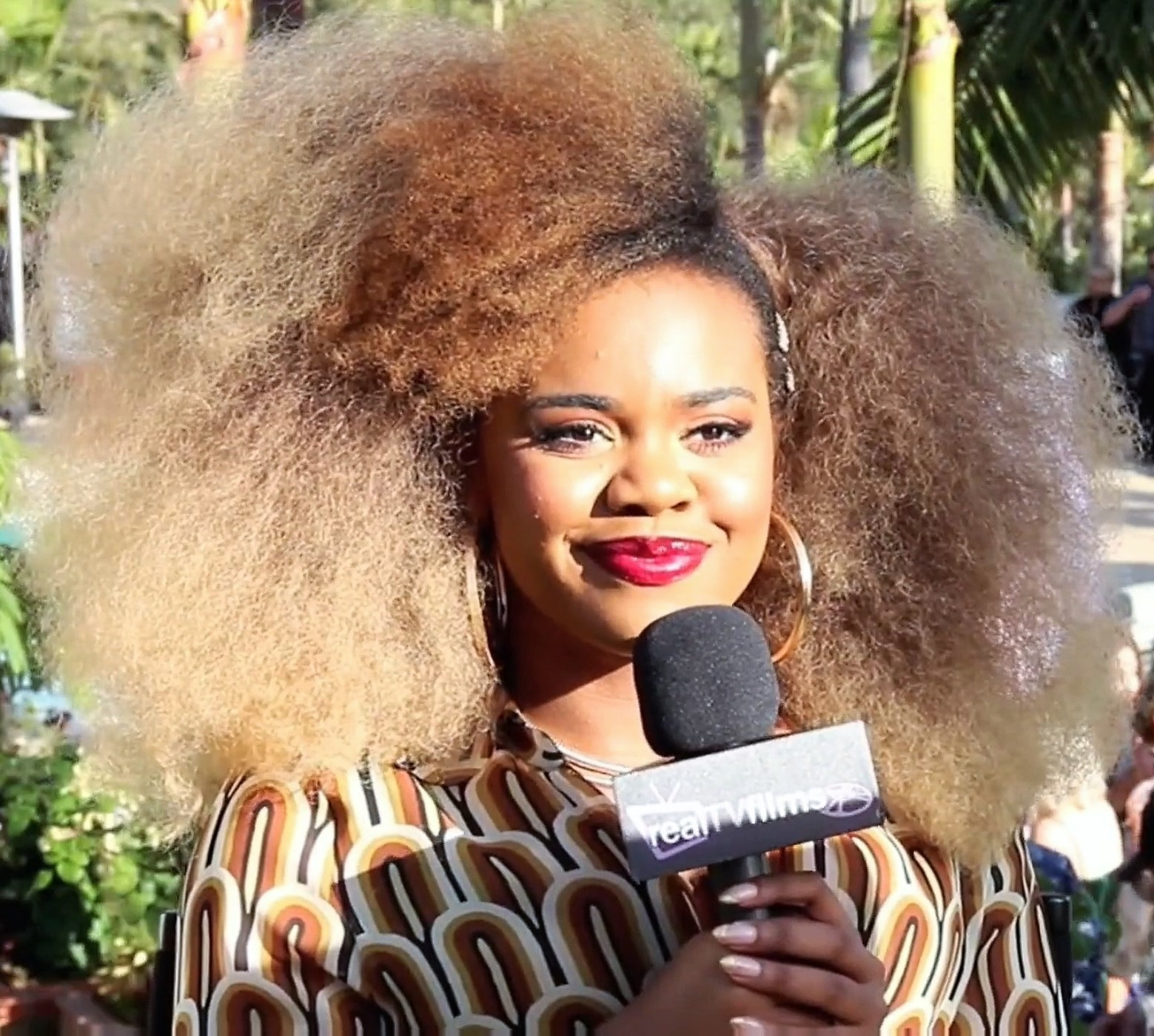
- Reneé in 2022
- Born: Dara Reneé Brooks; 2000 or 2001 (age 25–26); Los Angeles, California, U.S.
- Occupations: Actress; model; rapper; singer; songwriter
- Years active: 2018–present

Dara Reneé Brooks (born 2000 or 2001) is an American actress, model, rapper, singer and songwriter whose notable roles include Kourtney Greene in the Disney+ mockumentary series High School Musical: The Musical: The Series and Uliana in the film Descendants: The Rise of Red, earning an Emmy Award nomination for the latter. She also was the host of the baking competition show Disney's Magic Bake-Off.

== Early life ==
Reneé was born in Los Angeles, California, and raised in Baltimore where her mother, Kimberly Brooks, founded a non-profit performing arts school, Encouraging Youth To Dream, in Pikesville. Brooks is also an actress and Reneé's grandmother was a member of 1960s Baltimore soul group The Royalettes. Reneé attended John Paul Regional Catholic School in Milford Mill. She began auditioning for theatre roles in New York before moving back to California to finish high school at Charter High School of the Arts (CHAMPS) in Van Nuys.

== Career ==
Reneé debuted with the role of Savannah in the 2018 Disney Channel Original Movie Freaky Friday.

In 2019, she had a recurring role as Stunts in the fifth season of the ABC Television series Black-ish. She also had a guest role in The Kids Are Alright.

Reneé stars in the Disney+ series High School Musical: The Musical: The Series as Kourtney, a student, makeup artist and Nini's best friend. The series premiered in November 2019. Reneé had auditioned for the role of Kourtney, Kourtney was originally intended to be a one-off character, but Reneé was invited to become a series regular. She created the series' arrangement of "Bop to the Top". Starting in season 2 of the series, her own mother played her character Kourtney's mother, Michelle.

In 2021, it was announced that she would host Disney's Magic Bake-Off with Raven's Home star Issac Ryan Brown.

At the 2022 D23 Expo, her casting as Uliana, the sister of Ursula the Sea Witch, in Descendants 4 was revealed. The film, later officially titled Descendants: The Rise of Red, was released in 2024. She reprised the character in a voice role in the 2024 short film Wickedly Sweet: A Descendants Short Story.

In the summer of 2025, Reneé starred in the Descendants/Zombies: Worlds Collide Tour, a live concert experience featuring actors from Disney's Descendants and Zombies franchises, which ran from 17 July to 16 September.

== Filmography ==
Year	Title	Role	Notes
2018	Freaky Friday	Savannah	Television film
2019	The Kids Are Alright	Melissa	Episode: "Show Boat"
2019	Black-ish	Stunts	3 episodes: "Waltz in A Minor"; "Dreamgirls and Boys"; "Son of a Pitch"
2019	My Stepfather's Secret	Fee	Television film
2019–2023	High School Musical: The Musical: The Series	Kourtney Greene	Main role
2020	Descendants Remix Dance Party	Herself	Television special
2021	Disney's Magic Bake-Off	Herself	Host
2021	Disney Princess Remixed - An Ultimate Princess Celebration	Herself	Television special
2021	Grey's Anatomy	Janice	Episode: "Today was a Fairytale"
2024	Descendants: The Rise of Red	Uliana	Film
2024	Chibi Tiny Tales	Herself	Voice role; Episode: "Descendants 1+2+3: As Told By Chibi"
2024	Wickedly Sweet: A Descendants Short Story	Uliana	Short film; Voice role
2025	Electric Bloom	Herself	Episode: "How It All Came Out in the Wash"

== Discography ==
=== Albums ===
==== Soundtrack albums ====
Title	Album details
High School Musical: The Musical: The Series: The Soundtrack	Released: January 10, 2020; Label: Walt Disney; Format: Digital download, streaming, CD; RIAA: Gold
High School Musical: The Musical: The Holiday Special: The Soundtrack	Released: November 20, 2020; Label: Walt Disney; Format: Digital download, streaming
High School Musical: The Musical: The Series: The Soundtrack: Season 2	Released: July 30, 2021; Label: Walt Disney; Format: Digital download, streaming, CD
High School Musical: The Musical: The Series: The Soundtrack: Season 3	Released: September 15, 2022; Label: Walt Disney; Format: Digital download, streaming, CD
High School Musical: The Musical: The Series: The Soundtrack: The Final Season	Released: July 25, 2023; Label: Walt Disney; Format: Digital download, CD
Descendants: The Rise of Red	Released: July 12, 2024; Label: Walt Disney; Format: Digital download, CD

=== Singles ===
Title	Year	Album
"Evolution"	2020	Non-album single
"Believe"	2020	High School Musical: The Musical: The Holiday Special: The Soundtrack
"Beauty and the Beast"	2021	High School Musical: The Musical: The Series: The Soundtrack: Season 2
"Here I Come"	2022	High School Musical: The Musical: The Series: The Soundtrack: Season 3
"Let It Go"	2022	High School Musical: The Musical: The Series: The Soundtrack: Season 3
"Jump"	2023	High School Musical: The Musical: The Series: The Soundtrack: The Final Season
"Worlds Collide"	2025	Descendants/Zombies Worlds Collide Tour Official Playlist
"Imma Do It"	2025	Non-album single
"Glitter Glide"	2026	Stitch and Angel's Pop Star Party
"Never Waste A Heartbreak (Live)"	2026	Non-album single

=== Other charted songs ===
Title	Year	Album
"Stick to the Status Quo" (Rehearsal)	2020	High School Musical: The Musical: The Series: The Soundtrack
"Bop to the Top" (Nini & Kourtney Version)	2020	High School Musical: The Musical: The Series: The Soundtrack
"Stick to the Status Quo" (Performance)	2020	High School Musical: The Musical: The Series: The Soundtrack
"We're All in This Together" (Cast)	2020	High School Musical: The Musical: The Series: The Soundtrack
"Something in the Air"	2020	High School Musical: The Musical: The Holiday Special: The Soundtrack
"Christmas (Baby Please Come Home)"	2020	High School Musical: The Musical: The Holiday Special: The Soundtrack
"High School Musical 2 Medley"	2021	High School Musical: The Musical: The Series: The Soundtrack: Season 2
"Belle"	2021	High School Musical: The Musical: The Series: The Soundtrack: Season 2
"1-2-3"	2021	High School Musical: The Musical: The Series: The Soundtrack: Season 2
"Be Our Guest"	2021	High School Musical: The Musical: The Series: The Soundtrack: Season 2
"Something There"	2021	High School Musical: The Musical: The Series: The Soundtrack: Season 2
"What Time Is It/Start the Party Mashup"	2022	High School Musical: The Musical: The Series: The Soundtrack: Season 3
"I Want It All"	2023	High School Musical: The Musical: The Series: The Soundtrack: The Final Season
"Perfect Revenge"	2024	Descendants: The Rise of Red

== Awards and nominations ==
Year	Organisation	Category	Project	Result	Ref.
2026	Children's and Family Emmy Awards	Outstanding Supporting Performer in a Preschool, Children's or Young Teen Program	Descendants: The Rise of Red	Nominated	
