= Easier (album) =

2026 album by Joshua Bassett

Studio album by Joshua Bassett
- Released: August 14, 2026
- Length: 34:16
- Label: Plush
- Producers: Jon Class; Joshua Bassett; Nate Livingston; Nate Miles; Rudey; Tommy Champion; Will Rosen

Joshua Bassett chronology
| The Golden Years (2024) | Easier (2026) |

Singles from Easier
- 1. "Blue" Released: September 30, 2025; 2. "Clouds" Released: July 17, 2026; 3. "Hold Me" Released: July 24, 2026; 4. "Easier" Released: July 31, 2026; 5. "Dancing on the Edge" Released: August 7, 2026

Easier is the second studio album by American singer-songwriter Joshua Bassett, released on August 14, 2026, through Plush Records.

== Background ==
The albums lead single "Blue" was released on September 30, 2025. "Clouds" was released on July 17, 2026. The song expands on the sound heard across his previous discography, but features a more mature edge. While on his press tour for his memoir Rookie: My Public, Private, and Secret Life, Bassett mentioned he was taking a more active role with the production of his new songs. He also teased more songs coming soon. "Hold Me" and the title track "Easier" were released over the following two weeks. Bassett announced the release of his second album on August 6, 2026. The albums fifth single "Dancing on the Edge" was announced at the same time and would be released the next day.

== Critical reception ==
Professional ratings
Review scores
| Source | Rating |
|---|---|
| PopMatters | 8/10 |

Writing for PopMatters, Jeffrey Davies complimented the personal nature of the album, which he felt made it more approachable to audiences. He wrote that "with his penchant for deep emotional hooks and insight, Joshua Bassett's music has always been easy to get under your skin. Easier is his best". Isabella Perez of Melodic Magazine called the album a "great project", naming its vulnerability and honesty over the spectacle as its strong points. For her, "every song on this album feels intentional; there’s no filler or place where he can hide from the listener or himself".

== Track listing ==
Easier track listing
| No. | Title | Writer(s) | Producer(s) | Length |
|---|---|---|---|---|
| 1. | "Blue" | Joshua Bassett; Nate Miles | Miles | 4:15 |
| 2. | "Dancing on the Edge" | Bassett; Miles; Ricky Manning | Bassett; Nate Livingston; Miles; Will Rosen | 4:19 |
| 3. | "Hold Me" | Bassett; Miles | Bassett; Livingston; Miles | 3:31 |
| 4. | "Selfish, Love" | Bassett; Miles | Bassett; Livingston; Miles | 3:05 |
| 5. | "Clouds" | Bassett; Miles; Nicholas Bradley; Manning | Bassett; Miles | 3:27 |
| 6. | "I Still Care" | Bassett; Miles | Bassett; Livingston; Miles; Rosen | 3:20 |
| 7. | "Easier" | Bassett; Jon Class; Matt Hastings | Class; Bassett; Livingston | 3:55 |
| 8. | "Ruined" | Bassett; Tommy Champion | Bassett; Livingston; Champion | 4:28 |
| 9. | "No One Loves Like You" | Bassett; Noah Levine; Rudey | Bassett; Livingston; Rudey; Rosen | 3:56 |
| Total length: | | | | 34:16 |

== Personnel ==
Credits are adapted from Tidal.

=== Musicians ===
- Joshua Bassett – vocals (all tracks)

=== Technical ===
- Dale Becker – mastering (3)
- Jade Berry – mixing (2)
- Nate Livingston – mixing (3, 6)
- Nate Miles – mixing (5), vocal engineering (5)
