= High School Musical: The Musical: The Series: The Soundtrack: Season 2 =

2021 soundtrack album

Soundtrack album by Cast of High School Musical: The Musical: The Series
- Released: July 30, 2021
- Recorded: February 2020–March 2021
- Genres: Pop; teen pop; musical theatre
- Length: 1:13:02
- Label: Walt Disney

High School Musical chronology
High School Musical: The Musical: The Holiday Special: The Soundtrack (2020)	High School Musical: The Musical: The Series: The Soundtrack: Season 2 (2021)	High School Musical: The Musical: The Series: The Soundtrack: Season 3 (2022)

High School Musical: The Musical: The Series: The Soundtrack: Season 2 is the soundtrack album for the second season of the streaming television series High School Musical: The Musical: The Series, which was released coinciding with the second-season finale on July 30, 2021, by Walt Disney Records. The soundtrack for the season contains original songs, as well as songs from the film High School Musical 2 and the stage adaptation of the 1991 film Beauty and the Beast.

== Background ==
In October 2019, High School Musical: The Musical: The Series was renewed for a second season, even before the first season's debut on Disney+ on November 12, 2019. Responding to fan speculation, creator and showrunner Tim Federle denied rumors the second season would revolve around the plot of High School Musical 2; instead, it was revealed in February 2020 the musical would be the stage adaptation of the 1991 film Beauty and the Beast.

== Composition ==
The soundtrack features new recordings of songs from the film High School Musical 2; "Bet On It" and a medley that includes the songs "Fabulous," "You Are The Music In Me" and "All For One." Also included are new recordings of songs from the stage adaptation of the 1991 film Beauty and the Beast; "Belle," "Beauty and the Beast," "Home," "The Mob Song," "Gaston," "If I Can't Love Her," "Be Our Guest" and "Something There" by Alan Menken, Howard Ashman, and Tim Rice. The soundtrack also features a cover of the Miley Cyrus song "The Climb" by star Joe Serafini.

Recurring star Derek Hough appears as a featured artist on the song "Around You" alongside cast member Kate Reinders. Olivia Rose Keegan, another recurring star, has a solo performance of the song "Home" as the album's closer; and Roman Banks has a solo performance of the song "If I Can't Love Her."

Olivia Rodrigo also wrote a song for the second season, titled "The Rose Song", while Joshua Bassett wrote a song as well, "The Perfect Gift". On writing "The Rose Song", Rodrigo recalled it as "one of her best songs she had ever written" and has a "really intricate metaphor". They also recorded a duet song "Even When/The Best Part" for the series. Bassett revealed that he watched Zac Efron's performance of "Bet On It" from the 2007 film and had sung nearly 30 times with retakes to perform that track.

== Singles ==
Prior to the first episode's premiere, the duet song "Even When/The Best Part" performed by Rodrigo and Bassett was released on April 30, 2021.

In the lead-up to the album's release, each song was released as a single to correlate with the episodes being distributed and all music videos were released individually on the DisneyMusicVEVO YouTube channel as well as the individual artists' channels. "High School Musical 2 Medley", "Something in the Air", "Bet On It" and "The Perfect Gift", were released on the same date as the second season's debut on May 14, 2021. On May 21, 2021, the song "Belle" from the Beauty and the Beast musical, performed by the series cast was released as a single. The same day, the singles "1-2-3" and "YAC Alma Mater" was released. Bassett's solo rendition of "Even When" and Rodrigo's rendition of "The Best Part" were released on May 28 as singles, as was "Red Means Love" and the cover song of "Beauty and the Beast".

On June 4, the music video for "Granted" featuring Rodrigo was released. "A Dancer's Heart" and the cover song of "The Climb" performed by Joe Serafini was released on June 11. "The Rose Song" performed by Rodrigo and the accompanying music video was released on June 18, 2021. On June 25, the singles "Around You" and "The Mob Song" were released. The following week, the singles "Gaston" from the Beauty and the Beast Broadway stage musical, "If I Can't Love Her", were released. On July 9, the songs "You Ain't Seen Nothin'" and "Let You Go" were released. On July 16, the songs "In a Heartbeat" The final singles: "Be Our Guest" and "Something There" were released on July 23.

== Release and promotion ==
Pre-orders for the soundtrack began on July 21, 2021. The soundtrack was digitally released on July 30, 2021 on all music streaming services, and physically at Target. Walt Disney Records allowed exclusive "storylines" and "canvas" experiences for streamers on Spotify; the "storylines" card featured detailed description about key songs in the soundtrack, while the "canvas" experience, feature videos from the key moments in the second season. The Target exclusive release featured exclusive postcards, a sticker sheet and poster.

== Track listing ==
High School Musical: The Musical: The Series: The Soundtrack: Season 2 track listing
No.	Title	Writer(s)	Performer(s)	Length
1.	"Something in the Air"	Matthew Tishler; Shridhar Solanki	Cast of High School Musical: The Musical: The Series	3:14
2.	"The Perfect Gift"	Joshua Bassett	Bassett	2:39
3.	"Bet On It"	Antonina Armato; Tim James	Bassett	3:04
4.	"High School Musical 2 Medley"	David Lawrence; Faye Greenberg; Jamie Houston; Matthew Gerrard; Robert Nevil	Cast of High School Musical: The Musical: The Series	2:28
5.	"Belle"	Alan Menken; Howard Ashman	Cast of High School Musical: The Musical: The Series	3:04
6.	"1-2-3"	Bekah Novi; Jason Mater; Jordan Powers	Julia Lester; Dara Reneé; Sofia Wylie	2:15
7.	"YAC Alma Mater" (Glee Club Version)	Gabriel Mann; Jeannie Lurie	Mann	1:02
8.	"YAC Alma Mater" (Nini Version)	Mann; Lurie	Olivia Rodrigo	0:59
9.	"The Best Part"	Chantry Johnson; Michelle Zarlenga; Mitch Allan	Rodrigo	1:47
10.	"Even When"	Johnson; Zarlenga; Allan	Bassett	1:47
11.	"Even When/The Best Part"	Johnson; Zarlenga; Allan	Bassett; Rodrigo	1:47
12.	"Beauty and the Beast"	Menken; Ashman	Reneé	2:24
13.	"Red Means Love"	Justin Gray; Sam Shrieve	Lester; Larry Saperstein	2:09
14.	"Granted"	Powers; Josh Cumbee	Rodrigo	2:34
15.	"A Dancer's Heart"	Novi; Cheche Alara	Wylie	2:32
16.	"The Climb"	Jessica Alexander; Jon Mabe	Joe Serafini	3:34
17.	"Home" (Ashlyn Version)	Menken; Tim Rice	Lester	3:47
18.	"The Rose Song"	Rodrigo	Rodrigo	2:54
19.	"Around You"	Mater; Powers; Gabe Reali	Kate Reinders; Derek Hough	2:52
20.	"The Mob Song"	Menken; Ashman	Cast of High School Musical: The Musical: The Series	2:30
21.	"Gaston"	Menken; Ashman	Cast of High School Musical: The Musical: The Series	2:01
22.	"If I Can't Love Her"	Menken; Rice	Roman Banks	3:47
23.	"You Ain't Seen Nothin'"	Doug Rockwell; Tova Litvin	Cast of High School Musical: The Musical: The Series	2:37
24.	"Let You Go"	Powers; Cumbee	Bassett	3:08
25.	"In A Heartbeat" (featuring Joshua Bassett)	Mater; Brandon C. Rogers; Will Jay	Frankie A. Rodriguez	3:01
26.	"Be Our Guest"	Menken; Ashman	Cast of High School Musical: The Musical: The Series	2:42
27.	"Something There"	Menken; Ashman	Cast of High School Musical: The Musical: The Series	1:49
28.	"Second Chance"	Johnson; Zarlenga; Allan	Cast of High School Musical: The Musical: The Series	2:35
29.	"Home" (Lily Version)	Menken; Rice	Olivia Rose Keegan	2:00
Total length:				1:13:02

== Reception ==
Popsugar's Kelsie Gibson called the soundtrack as "even more fabulous than the first season". Paste's Alexis Gunderson wrote "the mix of new songs and Beauty and the Beast classics is perfectly struck, too."

== Charts ==
Weekly chart performance for High School Musical: The Musical: The Series: The Soundtrack: Season 2
Chart (2020)	Peak position
Australian Digital Albums (ARIA)	32
Canadian Albums (Billboard)	23
UK Soundtrack Albums (OCC)	14
US Billboard 200	58
US Soundtrack Albums (Billboard)	10

== See also ==
- High School Musical 2 (soundtrack)
