= High School Musical: The Musical: The Holiday Special =

2020 television special

- Written by: Tim Federle
- Directed by: Tim Federle
- Starring: Olivia Rodrigo; Joshua Bassett; Matt Cornett; Sofia Wylie; Larry Saperstein; Julia Lester; Dara Reneé; Frankie A. Rodriguez; Joe Serafini; Mark St. Cyr; Kate Reinders
- Music by: Gabriel Mann
- Country of origin: United States
- Original language: English

Production
- Executive producers: Tim Federle; Ashley Edens; Greg Hampson; Jen Muccia; Jeff T. Miller; Zack Lowenstein
- Producer: Mary Fukuto
- Production locations: Arizona City; New York City; Los Angeles, California; Salt Lake City, Utah
- Cinematography: Christopher Baffa
- Editors: Sharon Everitt; Dan Morita; Marcelo Sansevieri
- Running time: 45 minutes
- Production companies: Walt Disney Pictures; Chorus Boy; Salty Pictures

Original release
- Network: Disney+
- Release: December 11, 2020

High School Musical: The Musical: The Holiday Special is a musical television special created for Disney+ and written, produced and directed by Tim Federle. Inspired by the High School Musical film series, it featured the series' cast members Olivia Rodrigo, Joshua Bassett, Matt Cornett and Sofia Wylie amongst others, performing Christmas music and also previewed a snippet the second season of High School Musical: The Musical: The Series that released in May 2021.

As the production of the second season was halted due to the COVID-19 pandemic, Federle discussed on a possibility of directing a Christmas film with the cast. Inspired by various reality television music and dance competition programs, Federle wanted the special to explore the insights of the cast on who they actually are, instead of their characters in the series. The show was filmed during the pandemic with strict restrictions, on multiple cities with Federle remotely directing and supervising them.

The special was released on December 11, 2020 with an accompanying soundtrack that featured acoustic version of two original songs written for the second season, was released three weeks before.

== Production ==
=== Development ===
In March 2020, production of the second season of High School Musical: The Musical: The Series, along with many other projects around the world, has been halted due to increasing concerns regarding the COVID-19 pandemic. During the lockdown, series showrunner Tim Federle discussed the idea of doing a Christmas film with the cast. In an interview with TVLine, Federle stated, "...it still felt pretty dire. No one had really cracked it. So I said to Disney, 'What if we used this natural separation to our advantage and got to know the actors behind the characters?'"

On October 7, 2020, Disney+ publicly announced the television special. Federie wanted "the audience experience to be escaping into this holiday merriment" despite the difficulties in production. He recalled that he had been a fan of the reality television music and dance competition shows, like So You Think You Can Dance and American Idol. Hence, knowing that the cast would be separated and in their own hometowns, he thought "let's just use this as an opportunity to learn who they actually are, not as their characters".

=== Filming ===
The Holiday Special is a compilation of music videos where the cast perform renditions from Christmas, New Year and Hanukkah classics and pop hits, and share their holiday memories from their childhoods, presents, family traditions and photos and New Year resolutions. Filming of the videos were done with a small production crew during the fall of 2020, with Federie directing remotely at various locations in the four cities: Arizona, New York, Los Angeles, California and Salt Lake City in Utah.

Prior to the production, the cast were quarantined for around five months. Sofia Wylie's portions were shot at the Sonoran Desert during a heatwave, where she woke up at 4 am, and Federie directed it with the speakerphone attached to a microphone to it. Other primary locations, includes the Bachelor Mansion in Malibu, California, since most of the real locations were not available due to the pandemic restrictions.

The special would also feature a preview of the first musical performance in the second season, that featured the entire ensemble. It was shot at the East High School where the series is concurrently shot there.

=== Music ===
An album accompanying the special was released on November 20, three weeks prior to the premiere. It featured covers of classic Christmas and holiday songs, and two original songs which would be later used in the second season: "Something in the Air" and "The Perfect Gift".

== Marketing and release ==
A first look of the special was released on November 13, 2020 as an Entertainment Weekly exclusive, followed by a trailer that released five days later. The special was premiered through Disney+ on December 11.

== Critical reception ==
Sara Casaus of Young Entertainment Magazine reviewed "In a year that’s been tough to cope with from start to finish, this holiday special hits home as it celebrates what Christmas means to each cast member." Nicholas Soto of But Why Tho? recalled that he "really enjoyed watching the HSMTM: The Holiday Special. Getting to hear more about the cast and how they celebrated the holidays will have fans of the show feeling more connected to the cast. They’ll also get to know more about how music played a role in their lives and how music affected their holidays." Markos Papadatos of Digital Journal called it as "heartfelt and present" and praised Cornett and Bassett's performance. Margot Richlin of Inklings News wrote "Overall, if you are looking for a good way to ring in the holiday season and get to know one of your favorite casts, this holiday special is your best bet." In contrast, Sofia Hargis-Acevedo of The Central Trend summarized that "High School Musical, The Musical, The Holiday Special did not live up to its name and legacy."

Writing for Kveller, Linda Buchawald analyzed on the Jewish representation in the series, by singling out on Julia Lester and Larry Saperstein's contributions (the two Jewish cast members in the series) and recalled that it was "amazing to hear Lester and Saperstein speak so openly about their Judaism — both the difficult parts of feeling different and their pride in their traditions."

== See also ==
- High School Musical: The Musical: The Series
- List of High School Musical: The Musical: The Series episodes
