= High School Musical: The Musical: The Holiday Special: The Soundtrack =

2020 soundtrack album

Soundtrack album by Cast of High School Musical: The Musical: The Series
- Released: November 13, 2020
- Recorded: 2020
- Genres: Pop; teen pop; Christmas music
- Length: 34:34
- Label: Walt Disney

High School Musical chronology
High School Musical: The Musical: The Series: The Soundtrack (2020)	High School Musical: The Musical: The Holiday Special: The Soundtrack (2020)	High School Musical: The Musical: The Series: The Soundtrack: Season 2 (2021)

High School Musical: The Musical: The Holiday Special: The Soundtrack is the soundtrack album for the streaming television special of the same name. Featuring the cast of the Disney+ series High School Musical: The Musical: The Series, the special and its respective soundtrack were created following the shutdown of production of the second season due to the COVID-19 pandemic. The soundtrack was released on November 13, 2020, three weeks before the special itself was released on Disney+ on December 11.

== Background ==
In March 2020, production on the second season of High School Musical: The Musical: The Series, along with many other projects around the world, was shut down due to increasing concerns regarding the COVID-19 pandemic. Production would resume later that year with COVID-19 restrictions. Before production resumed, series showrunner Tim Federle decided on using the lockdowns to bring to life his idea of doing a Christmas movie with the cast. In an interview with TVLine, Federle stated, "...it still felt pretty dire. No one had really cracked it. So I said to Disney, 'What if we used this natural separation to our advantage and got to know the actors behind the characters?'" Filming of the music videos was also done with a very small production crew over the fall of 2020, with Federle directing remotely, across four states: Arizona, New York, California, and Utah. According to Federle, the crews "were just so happy to be working. Even though they're all wearing face shields and masks, everybody really brought their A game. I think they were able to kind of dust off some cobwebs and jump into something that felt good to make."

== Composition ==
The soundtrack mainly contains covers of classic Christmas and holiday songs, and two original songs that would later be used in the second season: "Something in the Air" and "The Perfect Gift."

Sofia Wylie chose to perform "This Christmas (Hang All The Mistletoe)" because, "I've never really had white Christmases with all the snow, so seeing a cactus decorated in lights and decorations, I was like, 'OK, yeah, this is so normal.' The holiday special is so lighthearted, so much fun and just a really wonderful Christmas dream. I think it will allow people to take a break and have a smile because this year has definitely been a lot." On writing "The Perfect Gift," Joshua Bassett noted that "That's the song. I thought that was a really special sentiment and something I can relate to in my life, in terms of growing up with five sisters. Gift-giving, it was more about the thoughtful gifts and less about the flashy gifts. So I can relate to that."

Julia Lester decided to do a medley of classic Hanukkah songs for the special. On this decision, she stated, "I could definitely sing you a hundred different Christmas songs off the top of my head. But, where's the Mariah Carey version of a Hanukkah song? So, I thought [in the special] I would add a little bit of music video flare to Hanukkah." Larry Saperstein, who is Jewish, tap dances to "White Christmas" by Irving Berlin. He stated, "Sometimes I did feel embarrassed that I celebrated Hanukkah and not Christmas. Now that I'm an adult I've taken real ownership over the fact that I am Jewish and that I do celebrate a holiday that might not be what everybody celebrates and it makes me unique and I'm so proud of that."

On choosing Joni Mitchell's song "River," Olivia Rodrigo told PopSugar, "It was such an honor to get to sing 'River.' It's a song that I absolutely love. It's a songwriter that I absolutely adore and look up to so much. It's a sad Christmas song — I love sad songs, I'm a ballad girl — and it was cool to put a little holiday twist on that."

== Release and promotion ==
The soundtrack to the special was released to all music streaming services on November 20, 2020, three weeks before the special itself was released to Disney+ on December 11. Unlike the soundtrack to the first season, and later the second and third seasons, there were no singles released prior to the soundtrack's release.

== Reception ==
Nicholas Soto of "But Why Tho?" said of the music, "When I heard that the HSMTM: The Holiday Special was going to include the cast singing holiday songs, I expected the cast to sing them together through Zoom or in-person but at a safe distance. However, I was excited to see that they would either sing in duets or by themselves. The songs served their purpose getting me into the holiday spirit...I also couldn't help but miss the show seeing the cast sing. What made the songs much more special was that we got to hear every cast member sing, which is something that season one missed out on." Alex Reif of "Laughing Place" states that "Ultimately, the soundtrack to High School Musical: The Musical: The Holiday Special is a mixed bag. There is one excellent new Christmas song and a handful of covers that do justice to their songs. As for the rest of it, I can guarantee you won't remember these versions exist this time next year." He would go on to praise "The Perfect Gift," "Believe," and "River" as the highlights of the soundtrack.

== Track listing ==
Credits adapted from Genius.

High School Musical: The Musical: The Holiday Special (Official Soundtrack) track listing
No.	Title	Writer(s)	Performer(s)	Length
1.	"This Christmas (Hang All the Mistletoe)"	Donny Hathaway; Nadine Theresa McKinnor	Sofia Wylie	2:40
2.	"The Perfect Gift"	Joshua Bassett	Bassett	2:40
3.	"Feliz Navidad"	José Feliciano	Frankie A. Rodriguez; Joe Serafini	2:47
4.	"Hanukkah Medley"	Samuel E. Goldfarb; Samuel S. Grossman; Joachim Stutschewsky; Joseph Achron; Hirsch Kopyt	Julia Lester	2:16
5.	"Last Christmas"	George Michael	Matt Cornett	2:58
6.	"White Christmas"	Irving Berlin	Larry Saperstein	2:03
7.	"Little Saint Nick"	Brian Wilson; Mike Love	Bassett; Cornett	1:42
8.	"Believe"	Alan Silvestri; Glen Ballard	Dara Reneé	3:43
9.	"What Are You Doing New Year's Eve?"	Frank Loesser	Kate Reinders; Mark St. Cyr	2:29
10.	"River"	Joni Mitchell	Olivia Rodrigo	3:22
11.	"Something in the Air"	Matthew Tishler; Shridhar Solanki	Cast of High School Musical: The Musical: The Series	3:16
12.	"That's Christmas to Me"	Scott Hoying; Kevin Olusola	Rodriguez; Serafini; Reinders; Lester	2:14
13.	"Christmas (Baby Please Come Home)"	Jeff Barry; Ellie Greenwich; Phil Spector	Bassett; Reneé; Cornett	2:18
Total length:				34:30
