= The Golden Years (album) =

2024 album by Joshua Bassett

Studio album by Joshua Bassett
- Released: July 26, 2024
- Genres: Folk; disco-pop
- Length: 39:37
- Label: Warner
- Producers: Joshua Bassett; Tommy English; Jeremy Hatcher; Jonah Summerfield

Joshua Bassett chronology
| Different (2022) | The Golden Years (2024) | Easier (2026) |

Singles from The Golden Years
- 1. "The Golden Years" Released: May 17, 2024; 2. "Dancing with Tears in My Eyes" Released: June 28, 2024

The Golden Years is the debut studio album by American singer-songwriter Joshua Bassett, released on July 26, 2024, through Warner Records. The album was preceded by its title track as the lead single on May 17, and the second single "Dancing with Tears in My Eyes", on June 28, 2024.

To promote the album, Bassett embarked on The Golden Years Tour, a headlining concert tour through North America and Europe, which started on July 30 and concluded on January 27, 2025.

== Background and conception ==
Bassett rose to mainstream recognition for his role as Ricky Bowen in Disney+'s mockumentary musical drama series High School Musical: The Musical: The Series (2019–2023); he also performed, wrote, and produced music for the program. In 2020, he signed with Warner Records. Following the release of his self-titled debut extended play in March 2021, Bassett released three more EPs and several singles in 2022 and 2023.

He described his third EP Sad Songs in a Hotel Room (2022) as a "stepping stone" to his debut studio album, which he revealed "[wasn't] done yet". In early 2023, Bassett revealed via his social media and in his cover story for the spring-summer issue of Behind The Blinds magazine—that the album was titled Complicated, at the time.

On May 17, Bassett officially announced his debut album The Golden Years and its release date as July 26, 2024. In a press release, he stated that the album "[encapsulates] the bitter-sweet nostalgia of [his] late teens and early twenties" and described it as a "love-letter to "the golden years" of his life [thus far]". He further said that it "spans the hope and heartbreak of [his] transition into adulthood. It's a genre-bending journal entry from the bottom of [his] heart."

== Release and promotion ==
The Golden Years was released on July 26, 2024, through Warner Records. The album is available via download and streaming services. On September 13, 2024, the album was also released on CD.

=== Singles ===
The title track was released as the lead single on May 17, 2024. "Dancing with Tears in My Eyes" was released as the second single on June 28, 2024.

=== Tour ===
On June 7, Bassett announced The Golden Years Tour, his third headlining tour, in support of the album, which visited North America and Europe. Comprising 39 dates, it started on July 30 in Phoenix, Arizona, and concluded on January 27, 2025, in Cologne, Germany. Sign-up for the presale was available the same day as the announcement. The presale took place on June 11, followed by the general sale on June 14. Thomas Day served as the supporting act of the whole tour.

== Critical reception ==
Professional ratings
Review scores
| Source | Rating |
|---|---|
| Slant Magazine | 3.5/5 stars |

The Golden Years received positive reviews from critics. Jeffrey Davies of Slant Magazine complimented the album's themes and lyrical content, with Bassett being praised for "maintaining a slower and steadier pace" with the songs. Writing for Variety, Mike Wass called the album "an eclectic album that dabbles in everything from folk fare to disco-pop".

== Track listing ==
The Golden Years track listing
| No. | Title | Writer(s) | Producer(s) | Length |
|---|---|---|---|---|
| 1. | "Biting My Tongue" | Joshua Bassett; Boy Matthews; Gabe Simon | Bassett; Tommy English; Jeremy Hatcher | 3:33 |
| 2. | "The Golden Years" | Bassett; English; Hatcher | Bassett; English; Hatcher | 3:31 |
| 3. | "Dancing with Tears in My Eyes" | Bassett; English; Hatcher | English; Hatcher; Bassett^{[c]} | 3:38 |
| 4. | "Don't Let Me Down" (with Jenna Raine) | Bassett; Aodhán King; Jenna Raine; Jimmy James | Bassett; English; Hatcher; James^{[c]} | 3:46 |
| 5. | "Cherry Blossom" | Bassett; English; Simon; Dan Wilson | Bassett; English; Hatcher | 2:35 |
| 6. | "Circles" | Bassett; English; Hatcher; Emma Rosen | Bassett; English; Hatcher | 3:58 |
| 7. | "Wildfire" | Bassett; Jonah Summerfield; Sara Davis | Bassett; English; Hatcher; Summerfield | 3:32 |
| 8. | "Little Rita" | Bassett | Bassett; English; Hatcher | 3:45 |
| 9. | "Would Ya Tell Me" | Bassett; English; Hatcher | Bassett; English; Hatcher | 3:34 |
| 10. | "Mirror" | Bassett; English; Hatcher; Rosen | Bassett; English; Hatcher | 4:23 |
| 11. | "Look How Far You've Come" | Bassett; Caroline Pennell; Oscar Görres | Bassett; English; Hatcher | 3:22 |
| Total length: | | | | 39:37 |

Note

- ^{^[c]} signifies a co-producer

== Personnel ==
Musicians

- Joshua Bassett – lead vocals (all tracks), piano (tracks 2, 4–7, 9–11), synthesizer (2, 4, 6, 8–10), keyboards (2, 4, 8, 9), background vocals (3, 6, 9, 11), drums (4, 7, 8), synth bass (4, 9), glockenspiel (6), acoustic guitar (8, 11), percussion (8)
- Tommy English – slide guitar (tracks 1, 2, 5–8, 11), 12-string guitar (1, 5), programming (1, 10), bass guitar (1, 11), acoustic guitar (2, 3, 10), electric guitar (2–4, 8–11), synthesizer (2–4, 8–10), keyboards (2–4, 8, 9), background vocals (3, 6, 9), drum programming (3, 9), synth bass (3), drums (4, 6, 8–11), percussion (8), glockenspiel (10)
- Jeremy Hatcher – programming (tracks 1, 10), synthesizer (2–4, 8–10), keyboards (2–4, 8, 9), bass guitar (2, 3, 5–10), electric guitar (2, 3, 9–11), acoustic guitar (2, 8, 10, 11), drum programming (3, 6, 7, 9), 12-string guitar (6, 8)
- Aksel Coe – drums (tracks 1, 2, 5), percussion (1)
- Gabe Simon – nylon-strung guitar (track 1)
- Valeria Falcón – bass guitar (track 4)
- João Perrusi – electric guitar (track 4)
- Jenna Raine – vocals (track 4), background vocals (11)
- Zane Carney – electric guitar (tracks 5, 7, 8)
- Christine Konopasky – background vocals (track 8)
- Luke Konopasky – background vocals (track 8)
- Rita Konopasky – background vocals (track 8)
- Woody Bassett – percussion (track 10)

Technical

- Randy Merrill – mastering
- Geoff Swan – mixing
- Lewis Chapman – mixing (track 3)
- Tommy English – engineering
- Jeremy Hatcher – engineering
- Ed McEntree – engineering (tracks 4, 8), vocal engineering (2)
- Davis Naish – vocal engineering (track 11)
- Aksel Coe – additional engineering (track 1)
- Michael Nolasco – additional engineering (tracks 2, 3)
- Matt Cahill – mixing assistance
- Joshua Bassett – engineering assistance

== Release history ==
Release history and formats for The Golden Years
| Region | Date | Format(s) | Label | Ref. |
|---|---|---|---|---|
| Various | July 26, 2024 | Digital download; streaming | Warner | |
| Various | September 13, 2024 | CD | Warner | |
