= Sad Songs in a Hotel Room =

2022 EP by Joshua Bassett

EP by Joshua Bassett
- Released: September 23, 2022
- Length: 18:29
- Label: Warner

Joshua Bassett chronology
Crisis / Secret / Set Me Free (2021)	Sad Songs in a Hotel Room (2022)	Different (2022)

Singles from Sad Songs in a Hotel Room
- 1. "Smoke Slow" Released: August 12, 2022; 2. "Lifeline" Released: September 23, 2022; 3. "Sad Songs in a Hotel Room" Released: September 27, 2022

Sad Songs in a Hotel Room is the third EP by American singer-songwriter Joshua Bassett, released on September 23, 2022, through Warner Records. It was intended by the artist to be a "stepping stone" to his debut album, which was released in 2024.

The EP was supported by the release of three singles, "Smoke Slow", released on August 12, "Lifeline", released on September 23, and "Sad Songs in a Hotel Room", released on September 27, 2022.

== Background and conception ==
Bassett rose to mainstream recognition for his role as Ricky Bowen in Disney+'s mockumentary musical drama series High School Musical: The Musical: The Series (2019–2023); he also performed, wrote, and produced music for the program. In 2020, he signed with Warner Records. Following the release of his self-titled debut extended play in March 2021, Bassett released three more EPs and several singles in 2022 and 2023.

He described his third EP Sad Songs in a Hotel Room (2022) as a "stepping stone" to his then-unreleased debut studio album, which he revealed "[was not] done yet".

In September 2022, Bassett released his third EP, Sad Songs in a Hotel Room. The second single of the project, "Lifeline", was a song dedicated to his mother, who was by his side while he was deathly ill in 2021. Bassett donated 100% of the proceeds for "Lifeline" to "organizations that are a lifeline for others". In addition, with the release of the single, he announced that he was creating an organization called "Find My Lifeline", a haven to provide people with support and lifelines for those who may not have a friend or family member to turn to.

== Critical reception ==
The album received a positive review from Billboard, with Joe Lynch complimenting the EP's production as well as Bassett's abilities as a songwriter "while trying to remain true to his own arrow amidst Hollywood and headlines".

== Track listing ==
Sad Songs in a Hotel Room track listing
No.	Title	Writer(s)	Producer(s)	Length
1.	"Sad Songs in a Hotel Room"	Joshua Bassett; Parker Welling; Jesse Frasure	Bassett; Davis Naish; Frasure	3:11
2.	"LA"	Bassett	Naish	3:11
3.	"Used to It"	Bassett; Rosie	Bassett; Naish	3:14
4.	"Smoke Slow"	Bassett; Ryan Raines; Brett McLaughlin	Bassett; Raines	2:43
5.	"Lifeline"	Bassett; Alexander O'Neil; Thomas Michel	Bassett; Naish; Hazey Eyes; Ayokay	3:49
6.	"All in Due Time"	Bassett; Sam de Jong; Katelyn Tarver	Bassett; de Jong	2:19
Total length:				18:29

== Personnel ==
Credits adapted from Tidal.

=== Musicians ===
- Joshua Bassett – vocals (all tracks)
- David Naish – additional percussion (4)
- Ryan Raines – bass (4), drums (4), guitar (4), piano (4), programming (4)
- Tim Mcnally – cello (4), viola (4), violin (4)

=== Technical ===
- Dale Becker – mastering (all tracks)
- Michael Freeman – mixing (1–3, 5–6)

== Charts ==
Weekly chart performance for Sad Songs in a Hotel Room
Chart (2022)	Peak position
UK Album Downloads Chart (OCC)	81

== Release history ==
Release history and formats for Sad Songs in a Hotel Room
Region	Date	Format(s)	Label	Ref.
Various	September 23, 2022	Digital download; streaming; vinyl	Warner	
