= Issac Ryan Brown =

American actor

- Born: July 12, 2005 (age 21)
- Occupation: Actor
- Years active: 2011–present
- Notable work: Booker in Raven's Home
- Website: issacryanbrown.com

Issac Ryan Brown (born July 12, 2005) is an American actor. He is known for his role as Booker Baxter Carter in Disney Channel's Raven's Home, which earned him a nomination at the 48th Daytime Emmy Awards for Outstanding Principal Performance in a Children's Program, and his role as Augustus "Gus" Porter in The Owl House.

== Career ==
At the age of six, Brown auditioned for America's Got Talent, performing songs such as Michael Jackson's "One More Chance", but did not advance to the quarter-finals.

Brown made his onscreen debut on the Nickelodeon series Sam & Cat. He portrayed Young Dre in various episodes of Black-ish. In the live-action television movie adaptation of the animated series Kim Possible, he portrayed the teenage computer genius Wade.

Brown also works as a voice-over artist. He voiced the lead character, Bingo, in the Disney Junior series Puppy Dog Pals. Additional roles include Goby in Bubble Guppies and Haruna Kitumba in Miles from Tomorrowland. He voiced Stinky in The Stinky & Dirty Show, replacing Jaden Betts. In November 2019, it was announced that Brown would voice Gus Porter in Disney's The Owl House.

== Personal life ==
Brown currently resides in Los Angeles with his family.

== Filmography ==
=== Film ===
Year	Title	Role	Notes
2014	Papou	Myran	
2015	King Ripple	Young King Ripple	Short film
2015	The Neverlands	Young Khalil	Short film
2016	The Land Before Time XIV: Journey of the Brave	Chomper	Voice, direct-to-video
2016	Dreams My Master	Damian	Short film
2016	Batman v Superman: Dawn of Justice	Squatter Boy	
2016	Believe	Clarence Joseph	
2017	Kings	Shawnte	
2017	All I Want for Christmas Is You	Brett	Voice, direct-to-video
2018	Next Gen	Ric	Voice

=== Television ===
Year	Title	Role	Notes
2012	America's Got Talent	Himself	Eliminated at Vegas audition
2013	Sam & Cat	Kip	Episode: "#ToddlerClimbing"
2014	The Soul Man	Young Stamps	Episode: "Daddy Issues"
2014	Garfunkel and Oates	Timmy	Episode: "Eggs"
2014–2019	Black-ish	Young Dre	28 episodes
2015–2018	Miles from Tomorrowland	Haruna Kitumba	Voice, recurring role (24 episodes)
2015–2016	Bubble Guppies	Goby	Voice, main role (season 4)
2015	Devious Maids	Deion	4 episode
2015	Black Jesus	Boon-Boon	Episode: "No Room for Jesus"
2015	Adam Ruins Everything	Jake	2 episodes
2015–2017	How to Get Away with Murder	Christophe Edmond	5 episodes
2016	OMG!	Ryan	5 episodes
2016	Time Traveling Bong	Michael Jackson	Episode: "Chapter 2: The Middle"
2016	The Thundermans	Rodney	Episode: "Back to School" (uncredited)
2016–2017	Whisker Haven	Chai	Voice, 4 episodes
2017	NCIS: Los Angeles	Joey	Episode: "Kulinda"
2017	GO! Cartoons	Edgar	Episode: "The Summoning"
2017–2020	Puppy Dog Pals	Bingo	Voice, main role (seasons 1–3)
2017–2019	The Stinky & Dirty Show	Stinky	Main voice role
2017–2023	Raven's Home	Booker Baxter	Main role
2018	Summer Camp Island	Max	Voice role, 2 episodes
2018–2021	Family Guy	Additional voices	14 episodes
2019–2020	Kim Hushable	Wade	Miniseries
2019	Kim Possible	Wade	TV movie
2019	The Rookie	AJ Clemons	Episode: "Safety"
2019	Costume Quest	Everett Nichols	Main voice role
2020–2023	The Owl House	Gus	Recurring voice role, 24 episodes
2020	Bunk'd	Booker Baxter	Crossover episode: "Raven About Bunk'd: Part 2"
2021	Disney's Magic Bake-Off	Himself	Host
2022	The Neighborhood	Peter	Episode: "Welcome to the Hot Prospect"
2023	Saturdays	Booker Baxter	Crossover episode: "Emma Dilemma"
2023	Kiya & the Kimoja Heroes	Bra Jabu	Recurring voice role, 18 episodes
2024	Work It Out Wombats!	Duper	Voice role, 1 episode
2025	The Sex Lives of College Girls	Terry	2 episodes
2026	NCIS	Navy Seaman Daniel "Danny" Harvey	Episode: "Fleeting"
2026	RoboGobo	Leroy	Voice role, 1 episode

=== Web ===
Year	Title	Role	Notes
2017	GO! Cartoons	Edger	Episode: "The Summoning"

== Awards and nominations ==
Year	Award	Category	Recipient	Result	Ref.
2021	Daytime Emmy Awards	Outstanding Principal Performance in a Children's Program	Raven's Home	Nominated	
