= List of High School Musical: The Musical: The Series episodes =

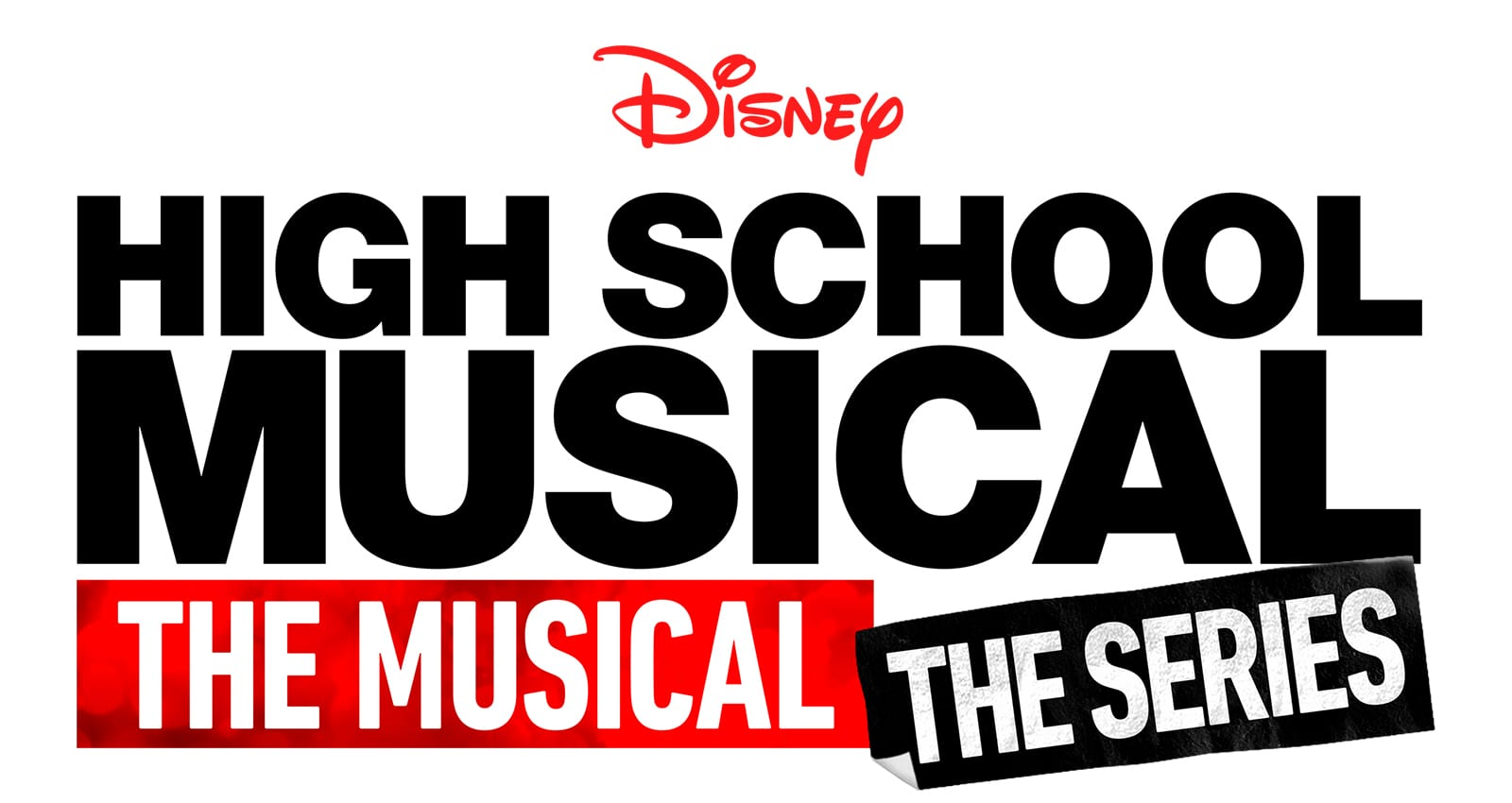
The words "Disney High School Musical The Musical The Series" are shown in red, white and black font, in various styles and sizes against a white background.

High School Musical: The Musical: The Series is an American mockumentary musical drama television series created for Disney+ by Tim Federle, inspired by the High School Musical film series. The series is produced by Chorus Boy and Salty Pictures in association with Disney Channel, with Oliver Goldstick serving as showrunner for the first four episodes. He was succeeded by Federle for the remainder of the first season and thereafter. Set at a fictionalized version of East High School, the school at which the original movie was filmed, the series follows a group of teenage theater enthusiasts who participate in a staging of High School Musical: The Musical as their school production, among others. It also explores their lives as they navigate friendships, love, interests, identity, and family relationships.

Since its debut on Disney Channel, ABC, and Freeform as a preview simulcast on November 8, 2019, High School Musical: The Musical: The Series has released 38 episodes over four seasons. The series concluded in August 2023. Kabir Akhtar was nominated for a Directors Guild of America Award in 2021 for Outstanding Directorial Achievement in Children's Programs for the episode "Opening Night".

== Series overview ==
Season	Episodes	Originally released	
Season	Episodes	First released	Last released
1	10	November 8, 2019 (Note: The first episode premiered on ABC, Disney Channel and Freeform on November 8, 2019, serving as a simulcast preview before its release on Disney+ on November 12.)	January 10, 2020
2	12	May 14, 2021	July 30, 2021
3	8	July 27, 2022	September 14, 2022
4	8	August 9, 2023	

== Episodes ==
=== Season 1 (2019–20) ===
No. overall	No. in season	Title	Directed by	Written by	Original release date
1	1	"The Auditions"	Tamra Davis	Tim Federle	November 8, 2019
2	2	"The Read-Through"	Tamra Davis	Oliver Goldstick	November 15, 2019
3	3	"The Wonderstudies"	Tamra Davis	Zach Dodes	November 22, 2019
4	4	"Blocking"	Chad Lowe	Margee Magee	November 29, 2019
5	5	"Homecoming"	Joanna Kerns	Tim Federle	December 6, 2019
6	6	"What Team?"	Kimberly McCullough & Joanna Kerns	Oliver Goldstick	December 13, 2019
7	7	"Thanksgiving"	Kimberly McCullough	Ann Kim	December 20, 2019
8	8	"The Tech Rehearsal"	Joanna Kerns	Natalia Castells-Esquivel	December 27, 2019
9	9	"Opening Night"	Kabir Akhtar	Oliver Goldstick	January 3, 2020
10	10	"Act Two"	Kabir Akhtar	Tim Federle	January 10, 2020

=== Season 2 (2021) ===
No. overall	No. in season	Title	Directed by	Written by	Original release date
11	1	"New Year's Eve"	Kimberly McCullough	Tim Federle	May 14, 2021
12	2	"Typecasting"	Kimberly McCullough	Ann Kim	May 21, 2021
13	3	"Valentine's Day"	Paul Hoen	Zach Dodes	May 28, 2021
14	4	"The Storm"	Paul Hoen	Ritza Bloom	June 4, 2021
15	5	"The Quinceañero"	Kimberly McCullough	Emilia Serrano	June 11, 2021
16	6	"Yes, And"	Kimberly McCullough	Ilana Wolpert	June 18, 2021
17	7	"The Field Trip"	Paul Hoen	Carrie Rosen	June 25, 2021
18	8	"Most Likely To"	Paul Hoen	Nneka Gerstle	July 2, 2021
19	9	"Spring Break"	Brent Geisler	Natalia Castells-Esquivel	July 9, 2021
20	10	"The Transformation"	Joanna Kerns	Jessica Leventhal	July 16, 2021
21	11	"Showtime"	Joanna Kerns	Zach Dodes	July 23, 2021
22	12	"Second Chances"	Kimberly McCullough & Joanna Kerns	Zach Dodes & Tim Federle	July 30, 2021

=== Season 3 (2022) ===
No. overall	No. in season	Title	Directed by	Written by	Original release date
23	1	"Happy Campers"	Kimberly McCullough	Zach Dodes	July 27, 2022
24	2	"Into the Unknown"	Kimberly McCullough	Ilana Wolpert	August 3, 2022
25	3	"The Woman in the Woods"	Angela Tortu	Natalia Castells-Esquivel	August 10, 2022
26	4	"No Drama"	Angela Tortu	Nneka Gerstle	August 17, 2022
27	5	"The Real Campers of Shallow Lake"	Ann Marie Pace	Jessica Leventhal	August 24, 2022
28	6	"Color War"	Christine Lakin	Chandler Turk	August 31, 2022
29	7	"Camp Prom"	Kimberly McCullough	Zach Dodes	September 7, 2022
30	8	"Let It Go"	Kimberly McCullough	Tim Federle	September 14, 2022

=== Season 4 (2023) ===
No. overall	No. in season	Title	Directed by	Written by	Original release date
31	1	"High School Musical 4"	Hisham Abed	Tim Federle	August 9, 2023
32	2	"HSM v. HSM"	Kimberly McCullough	Ilana Wolpert	August 9, 2023
33	3	"A Star Is Reborn"	Kimberly McCullough	Ann Kim	August 9, 2023
34	4	"Trick or Treat"	Ann Marie Pace	Elisabeth Kiernan Averick	August 9, 2023
35	5	"Admissions"	Ann Marie Pace	Nneka Gerstle	August 9, 2023
36	6	"Trust the Process"	Kimberly McCullough	Chandler Turk	August 9, 2023
37	7	"The Night of Nights"	Kimberly McCullough	Zach Dodes	August 9, 2023
38	8	"Born to Be Brave"	Tim Federle	Tim Federle	August 9, 2023

== Specials ==
Title	Directed by	Original release date
"High School Musical: The Musical: The Series: The Special"	Clayton Cogswell	December 14, 2019 (Note: The first special premiered on ABC Owned Television Stations, among them WTVD-TV Raleigh, KFSN-TV Fresno, and KABC-TV Los Angeles, on December 14, 2019, before its release on Disney+ on December 20.)
This special features archive making-of footage from the production of the original High School Musical film. Film director Kenny Ortega and cast member Corbin Bleu talk about their experience on the film and meet the cast of High School Musical: The Musical: The Series. Lucas Grabeel also announces his guest appearance on the series. Series creator Tim Federle discusses the song "Just For a Moment", and the cast performs at the 2019 D23 Expo in Anaheim, California.
"High School Musical: The Musical: The Holiday Special"	Tim Federle	December 11, 2020
A holiday special in which the cast performs Christmas music. A song from the second season, "Something in the Air", is featured as a preview, as well as a performance of "The Perfect Gift" by Bassett.
