= High School Musical: The Musical: The Series =

2019 American mockumentary television series

- Genre: Drama; Musical; Mockumentary
- Created by: Tim Federle
- Based on: High School Musical by Peter Barsocchini
- Starring: Olivia Rodrigo; Joshua Bassett; Matt Cornett; Sofia Wylie; Larry Saperstein; Julia Lester; Dara Reneé; Frankie Rodriguez; Mark St. Cyr; Kate Reinders; Joe Serafini; Saylor Curda; Adrian Lyles; Liamani Segura
- Composer: Gabriel Mann
- Country of origin: United States
- Original language: English
- No. of seasons: 4
- No. of episodes: 38 (list of episodes)

Production
- Executive producers: Oliver Goldstick; Tim Federle; Bill Borden; Barry Rosenbush; Tamra Davis
- Producers: Greg A. Hampson; Jeff T. Miller
- Production locations: Salt Lake City (seasons 1–2, 4); Los Angeles (season 3)
- Camera setup: Single-camera
- Running time: 26–61 minutes
- Production companies: Chorus Boy; Salty Pictures; Disney Channel; Disney Branded Television

Original release
- Network: Disney+ (Note: The first episode premiered on ABC, Disney Channel, and Freeform on November 8, 2019, serving as a simulcast preview before its release on Disney+ on November 12.)
- Release: November 8, 2019 – August 9, 2023

High School Musical: The Musical: The Series is an American mockumentary musical drama television series created for Disney+ by Tim Federle, inspired by the High School Musical film series. The series is produced by Chorus Boy and Salty Pictures in association with Disney Channel. Oliver Goldstick served as showrunner for the first four episodes; he was succeeded by Federle for the remainder of the first season and thereafter.

Set at a fictionalized version of East High School, the school at which the original movies were filmed, the first season follows a group of teenage theater enthusiasts who participate in a staging of High School Musical: The Musical (Note: High School Musical: The Musical refers to a fictional musical production adaptation of High School Musical.) as their school production. The series showcases a different featured musical in each following season, and explores the lives of the characters as they navigate friendships, love, interests, identity, and family relationships. The series stars Olivia Rodrigo, Joshua Bassett, Matt Cornett, Sofia Wylie, Larry Saperstein, Julia Lester, Dara Reneé, Frankie Rodriguez, Mark St. Cyr, Kate Reinders, Joe Serafini, Saylor Bell Curda, Adrian Lyles and Liamani Segura. Several cast members from the original film series also appear in guest roles as fictionalized versions of themselves.

High School Musical: The Musical: The Series premiered on Disney Channel, ABC, and Freeform as a preview simulcast on November 8, 2019, ahead of its launch on Disney+ on November 12; its first season consisted of 10 episodes. Before the series debuted, it was renewed by Disney+ for a second season of 12 episodes that premiered in May 2021. The third season consisting of eight episodes premiered in July 2022. The fourth and final season consisting of eight episodes premiered in August 2023. Critical reviews have highlighted the performances of the cast, particularly those of Bassett and Rodrigo, and compared the series to Glee for its music and themes. There has been a mixed reception to the program's mockumentary format. The series won a GLAAD Media Award, six Nickelodeon Kids' Choice Awards, and was nominated for fourteen Children's and Family Emmy Awards, winning twice for Outstanding Original Song for a Children's or Young Teen Program and Outstanding Choreography.

== Premise ==
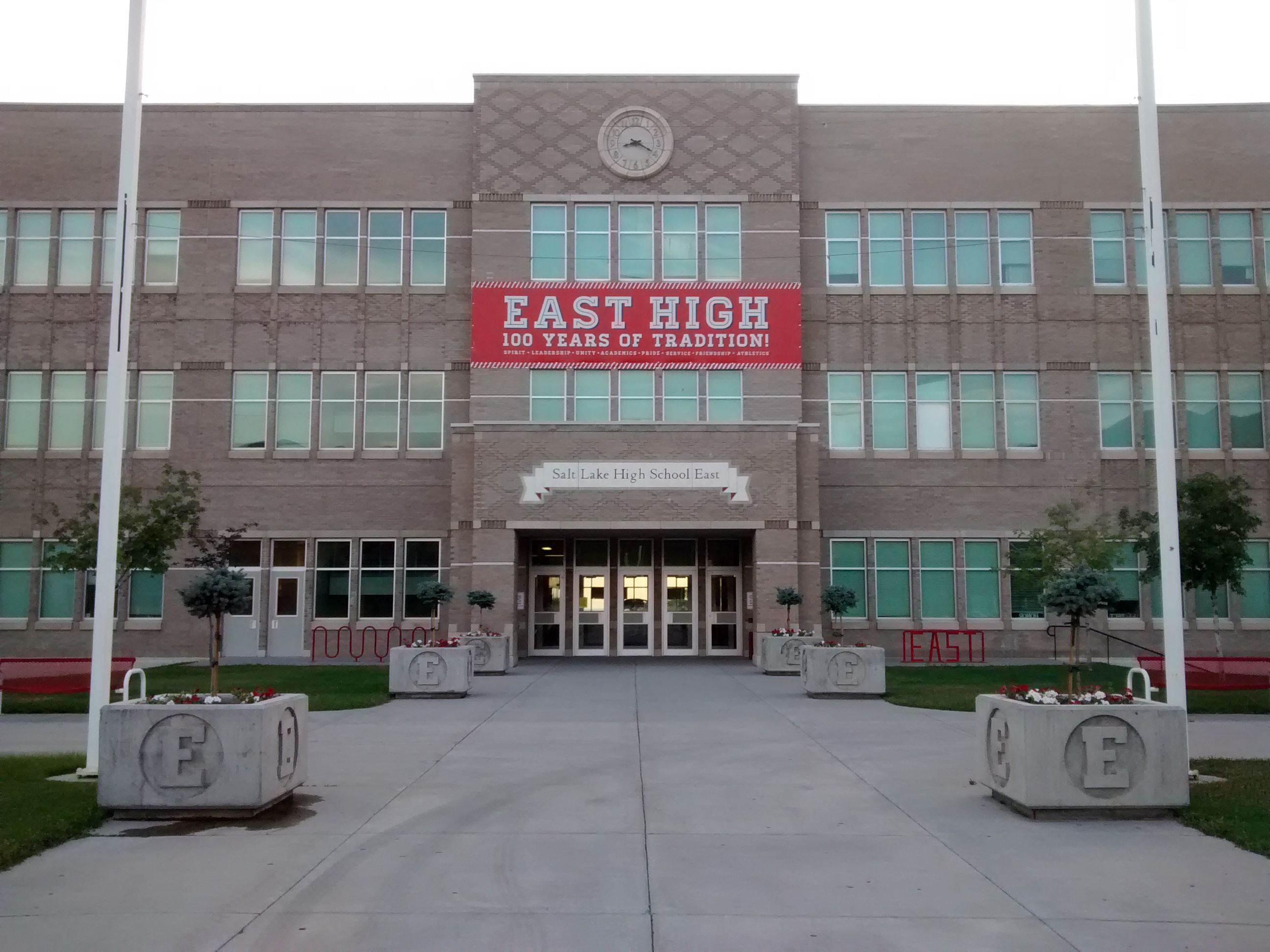
East High School in Salt Lake City, Utah, pictured in 2014

At a fictionalized version of East High School in Salt Lake City, Utah, Miss Jenn begins work as the new drama teacher. The school holds significance as it is where the High School Musical films, a series of Disney Channel original movies, were filmed. Miss Jenn was a former background cast member in the film, and the teacher decides to stage a performance of High School Musical: The Musical for her first winter theater production to celebrate the school's affiliation with the original film. The club members cast in High School Musical: The Musical learn to navigate their interpersonal relationships while overcoming the challenges of the rehearsal process.

During the second season, the theater students of East High stage a production of Beauty and the Beast for the spring musical. Miss Jenn leads the cast in an attempt to win a prestigious local student theater competition while facing off against their rival school, North High. The third season is set outside of the school year and features the students attending a summer theater camp in California, called Camp Shallow Lake. The campers prepare a stage production of Frozen while a documentary series about the rehearsal process is filmed over the summer. The theater students return to East High in the fourth and final season to stage a production based on the film High School Musical 3: Senior Year. They later learn that a fictionalized film sequel entitled High School Musical 4: The Reunion is being filmed at the school, and that they will become extras in the film.

== Cast and characters ==
=== Main ===
- Olivia Rodrigo as Nini Salazar-Roberts (seasons 1–2, recurring season 3), a musical theater enthusiast. She is cast as Gabriella Montez in the first season and in chorus roles in the second season. In the third season, she embarks on a road trip to California to pursue her career in singing and songwriting.
- Joshua Bassett as Ricky Bowen, a guitarist and skateboarder who previously dated Nini. In the first season, he is cast as Troy Bolton despite his initial lack of interest in musicals. He is cast as the Beast in the second season and Kristoff in the third season. He plays Troy again in the fourth season.
- Matt Cornett as E. J. Caswell (seasons 1–3, recurring season 4), Ashlyn's cousin and a jock theater enthusiast Nini previously met at camp. He is cast as Chad Danforth and the understudy for Troy in the first season. He is cast as Gaston in the second season and Sven in the third season while also directing the camp's production of Frozen. After graduating, he returns to play Coach Bolton for the second act of the production in the fourth season.
- Sofia Wylie as Gina Porter, a transfer student with theater ambitions. She is cast as Taylor McKessie and the understudy for Gabriella in the first season, Babette the Featherduster in the second season, Anna in the third season, and Gabriella Montez in the fourth season. Additionally, she is cast as the lead in High School Musical 4: The Reunion.
- Larry Saperstein as Big Red (seasons 1–2, guest season 3, recurring season 4), Ricky's best friend, who fills in as stage manager for the production whenever Natalie is unavailable, despite his lack of knowledge about theater. He is later shown to have hidden talents in tap dancing and knowledge of electronics. He auditions for the spring musical in the second season and is cast as Le Fou.
- Julia Lester as Ashlyn Caswell, E. J.'s cousin and an aspiring songwriter, who is cast as Ms. Darbus in the first season, as Belle in the second season, in the ensemble in the third season, and as Kelsi Nielsen in the fourth season.
- Dara Reneé as Kourtney Greene, Nini's best friend and a self-proclaimed feminist, who works in the musical's costuming department. She auditions for the musical in the second season and is cast in the role of Mrs. Potts, Elsa in the third season, and Sharpay Evans in the fourth season.
- Frankie Rodriguez as Carlos Rodriguez, the choreographer of the first two East High productions, who works alongside Miss Jenn and is cast as Lumière in the second season, Olaf in the third season, and Ryan Evans in the fourth season.
- Mark St. Cyr as Benjamin Mazzara (seasons 1–2, recurring season 4), East High's STEM teacher, who is initially against the school's support of performing arts. He portrays Coach Bolton in the first act of the fourth season's production.
- Kate Reinders as Miss Jenn (seasons 1–2 and 4, recurring season 3), East High's new drama teacher, who appeared in the original High School Musical film as a background dancer and directs the school's production. She portrays Ms. Darbus in the fourth season's production.
- Joe Serafini as Seb Matthew-Smith (season 2, recurring seasons 1 and 4, guest season 3), a student who is cast in the role of Sharpay Evans in the first season and as Chip in the second season
- Saylor Curda as Maddox (season 3, recurring season 4), Jet's sister, a technology enthusiast and long-term camper who attends Camp Shallow Lake as a counselor-in-training, and is the stage manager for the productions in the third and fourth seasons.
- Adrian Lyles as Jet (season 3, recurring season 4), Maddox's brother, a reluctant new camper at Camp Shallow Lake who is cast as Hans in the camp's production. He is asked to play Chad Danforth in the fourth season.
- Liamani Segura as Emmy (season 4, recurring season 3), an eighth-grade camper who is a new participant in the musical and cast as Young Anna in the third season. She attends East High as a freshman in the fourth season and portrays Taylor McKessie.

=== Recurring ===
- Alexis Nelis as Natalie Bagley (seasons 1–2, guest season 4), the stage manager for the production
- Nicole Sullivan as Carol (season 1, guest season 3), one of Nini's mothers
- Michelle Noh as Dana (season 1, guest season 3), one of Nini's mothers
- Jeanne Sakata as Malou (season 1), Nini's grandmother
- Alex Quijano as Mike Bowen (seasons 1–2 and 4), Ricky's father, whose wife is estranged and currently living in Chicago
- Valente Rodriguez as Principal Gutierrez (seasons 1 and 4), the principal of East High
- Beth Lacke as Lynne Bowen (season 1, guest seasons 2 and 4), Mike's ex-wife and Ricky's mother who returns to announce she and Mike are getting divorced
- Napiera Groves Boykin as Terri Porter (season 4, guest season 1), Gina's mother, who works for FEMA
- Derek Hough as Zack (season 2), Miss Jenn's ex-boyfriend, who teaches drama at North High and is an actor
- Olivia Rose Keegan as Lily (season 2, guest season 3), a competitive and pretentious new student at East High who misses out on a role in the musical and later transfers to North High. She is cast as Belle in their production
- Roman Banks as Howie (season 2), a student who works at Big Red's family pizzeria. He is cast as the Beast in North High's production
- Andrew Barth Feldman as Antoine (season 2, guest season 4), a method actor who poses as a French foreign exchange student at North High. He is cast as Lumière in their production.
- Kimberly Brooks as Michelle Greene (seasons 2–4), Kourtney's mother
- Jason Earles as Dewey Wood (season 3, guest season 4), the camp director of Camp Shallow Lake
- Corbin Bleu as himself (season 3, guest season 4), appearing at Camp Shallow Lake as the host of the documentary. Bleu played Chad Danforth in the original film series.
- Ben Stillwell as Channing (season 3), a camera operator who films a documentary series about the camp production of Frozen
- Meg Donnelly as Val (season 3), a college student who returns to the camp as a Counselor-in-Training and is the choreographer of the camp musical
- Aria Brooks as Alex (season 3), an eighth-grader and newcomer to the camp, who is cast as Young Elsa in the musical
- Matthew Sato as Mack Alana (season 4), a sitcom actor who is cast as Gina's love interest in High School Musical 4: The Reunion
- Kylie Cantrall as Dani (season 4), a popular social media personality who is hired to make her acting debut in High School Musical 4: The Reunion, but is fired soon after. She later portrays Tiara Gold in the school's production of High School Musical 3: Senior Year.
- Caitlin Reilly as Quinn Robbins (season 4), the film director of High School Musical 4: The Reunion

=== Guest ===
- Kaycee Stroh as herself (seasons 1 and 4), a member of the school board. Stroh played Martha Cox in the original film series.
- Lucas Grabeel as himself (seasons 1 and 4). Grabeel played Ryan Evans in the original film series.
- Asher Angel as Jack (season 2), a boy from Denver whom Gina befriends at the airport
- Jordan Fisher as Jamie Porter (season 2), Gina's older brother who is a music producer
- Jesse Tyler Ferguson as Marvin (season 3), a friend and former colleague of Nini's mothers whom she meets again while in California, and discovers is her biological father
- JoJo Siwa as Madison (season 3), a former Camp Shallow Lake attendee who was previously in a relationship with Maddox
- Monique Coleman as herself (season 4). Coleman played Taylor McKessie in the original film series.
- Bart Johnson as himself (season 4). Johnson played Coach Bolton in the original film series.
- Alyson Reed as herself (season 4). Reed played Ms. Darbus in the original film series.
- Vasthy Mompoint as Krystal (season 4), the stand-offish choreographer of High School Musical 4: The Reunion

== Episodes ==
Season	Episodes	Originally released	
Season	Episodes	First released	Last released
1	10	November 8, 2019	January 10, 2020
2	12	May 14, 2021	July 30, 2021
3	8	July 27, 2022	September 14, 2022
4	8	August 9, 2023	

== Production ==
=== Development ===
On November 9, 2017, Disney announced the development of a television series adaptation of their High School Musical film series created by Peter Barsocchini. The series was expected to premiere on the upcoming Disney+ streaming service, which was still unnamed at the time. Tim Federle was approached by the company, and he pitched the documentary-style series in January 2018. He went on to draft the pilot together with Disney Channel, who contributed to the production of the series. The series is also produced by companies Chorus Boy and Salty Pictures. Federle was first reported to be serving as a writer and executive producer for the series in May 2018. In September, Disney officially gave the production a series order for a first season consisting of ten episodes. Oliver Goldstick was expected to serve as showrunner and an additional executive producer while Julie Ashton would oversee the casting process. Alongside this announcement, the show was described as a mockumentary, and a list of character names and descriptions was released. By May 2019, Goldstick had departed the series over "creative differences", having served as showrunner for the first four episodes. Nellie Andreeva of Deadline Hollywood attributed Goldstick's departure to him wanting to incorporate more mature themes in the series. Federle assumed the position of showrunner for the remainder of the first season.

In October 2019, ahead of the release of the first season, Disney+ renewed the series for a second season. Federle stated that the second season's plot would not revolve around a production of High School Musical 2; in February 2020, the featured production was reported as Beauty and the Beast.

Disney+ renewed the series for a third season in September 2021. For its third season, the story is set at a sleep-away theater camp and takes place over the summer school break. It was teased in November that the featured production would be Frozen, which was confirmed in January 2022.

Ahead of the third-season premiere, Disney+ renewed the series for a fourth season in May 2022. It was announced in September that the featured musical would be based on the film High School Musical 3: Senior Year. In the season, the students return to East High where the filming of a fictionalized film, High School Musical 4: The Reunion, takes place. It was reported in June 2023 that the series would end with its fourth season. Federle decided to end the series at a high point, midway through the production of the fourth season. He suggested that the series had reach a peak level of meta, and wanted to avoid a cliffhanger at the end of the season that might not get resolved if the series was later cancelled.

=== Writing ===
Federle drew inspiration for the mockumentary style of the series from other films and programs such as Waiting for Guffman and The Office. He was inspired to create a series that depicted music as a central theme, while also drawing on his experience as a former Broadway performer.

The series is LGBTQ-inclusive, with three gay characters being featured: Carlos, Seb, and Maddox, as well as two bisexual characters: Ashlyn and Big Red. In an interview with The Advocate, Frankie Rodriguez credited Federle for writing his character Carlos as gay without drawing on the tropes of a typical queer character. The character Seb plays the role of Sharpay in the musical, an example of non-traditional gender casting. The series begins the exploration of a same-sex relationship when Carlos asks Seb to the school dance in the episode "Homecoming". Ashlyn and Big Red come out in the third season; Federle stated that this had been suggested by Julia Lester and Larry Saperstein since the first season. The series further depicts same-sex parenting through Nini's two mothers Carol and Dana. The show also includes themes such as divorce and anxiety.

=== Casting ===
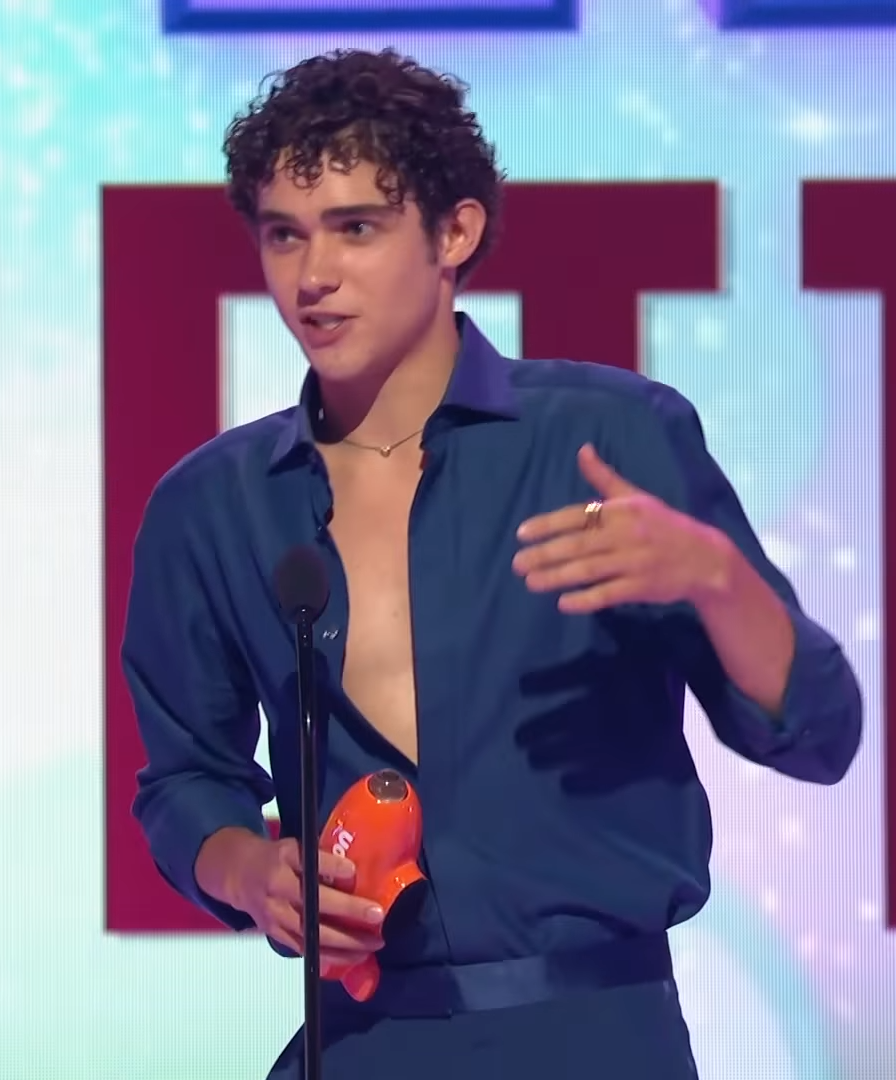
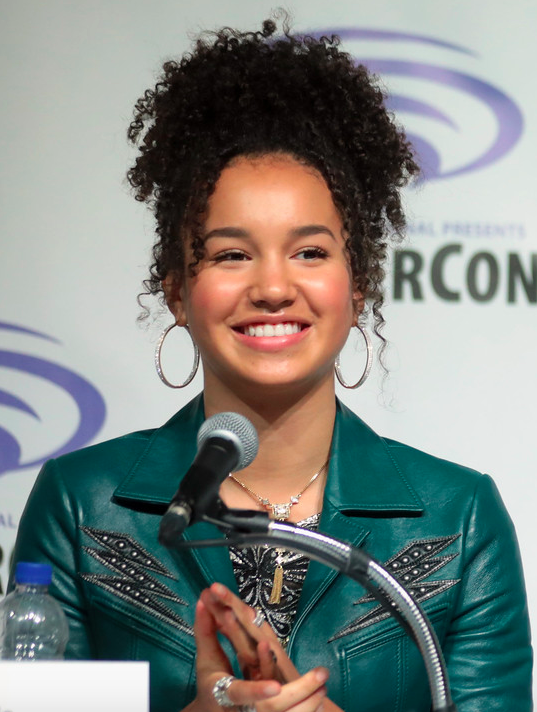
Joshua Bassett (left, 2022) and Sofia Wylie (right, 2019) portray Ricky and Gina respectively, throughout the series.

Federle commented on the importance of casting real teenagers in main roles to add authenticity to the high school-based series. Joshua Bassett was cast in the leading role of Ricky in October 2018. The remainder of the cast was made public in February 2019: Olivia Rodrigo as Nini, Kate Reinders as Miss Jenn, Sofia Wylie as Gina, Matt Cornett as E. J., Dara Reneé as Kourtney, Julia Lester as Ashlyn, Frankie Rodriguez as Carlos, Larry Saperstein as Big Red, and Mark St. Cyr as Mr. Mazzara. Federle confirmed in November 2019 that an unnamed cast member from the original film would make a cameo appearance through a fantasy sequence. After being listed as a featured artist on the soundtrack, Lucas Grabeel, who played Ryan Evans, was confirmed to be making an appearance on the series. Grabeel appears in the episode "The Tech Rehearsal" as a fictionalized version of himself, performing in a song alongside Reinders. Kaycee Stroh, who played Martha Cox, also makes a cameo appearance in the episode "What Team?".

In December 2019, it was reported that Joe Serafini, who plays Seb Matthew-Smith, would be promoted to the main cast for the second season. Further additions to the recurring cast were revealed in early 2020: Roman Banks as Howie; Olivia Rose Keegan as Lily; and Derek Hough as Zack, Miss Jenn's ex-boyfriend. In February 2021, Andrew Barth Feldman and Asher Angel joined the cast for the second season in recurring guest roles, as Antoine and Jack respectively. That July, it was revealed that Jordan Fisher would guest star as Jamie Porter in the penultimate episode of the second season.

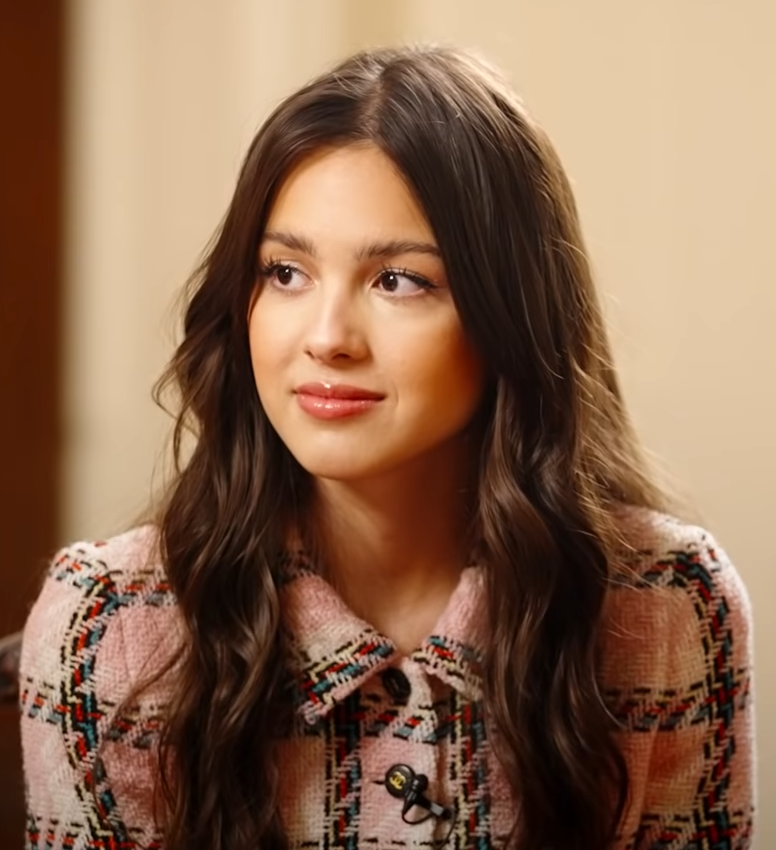
Olivia Rodrigo, pictured in 2021, portrays Nini Salazar-Roberts throughout the series' first three seasons.

Time reported in December 2021 that Rodrigo would return for the third season, amidst speculation that she would not due to the success of her solo music career. It was later stated that Rodrigo would return in a recurring role as opposed to the series regular status she maintained in the first two seasons; Federle confirmed that Rodrigo would exit the show after the third season. The casting for the third season was made public in January 2022; Bassett, Cornett, Wylie, Lester, Reneé, and Rodriguez were also confirmed to be returning. Saylor Bell Curda and Adrian Lyles joined the cast as new series regulars, playing Maddox and Jet respectively. Further additions to the guest cast included Jason Earles as Dewey Wood and Meg Donnelly as Val. Corbin Bleu, who starred in the original film series, was also announced as a guest, playing himself. Three further recurring characters were revealed in March: Ben Stillwell, Aria Brooks, and Liamani Segura as Channing, Alex and Emmy respectively. Saperstein, Reinders, Serafini, and Keegan were listed as guests for the third season in May 2022; it was stated that Mark St. Cyr would not return. Two additions to the guest cast were revealed the following month: JoJo Siwa as Madison and Jesse Tyler Ferguson as Marvin.

Federle stated in September 2022 that the fourth season would revolve around the characters Ricky, Gina, Ashlyn, Kourtney, and Carlos; it was later confirmed that Bassett, Wylie, Lester, Reneé, and Rodriguez would return. The casting announcement for the fourth season also revealed that Segura had been promoted to the main cast, and Reinders would return as a series regular. Federle confirmed that Rodrigo would not feature in the fourth season, but said that she could return to the series in the future. He said that he was in negotiations for original High School Musical cast members to star as guests in the season; it was announced that Bleu, Grabeel, and Stroh would return, joined by Monique Coleman, Bart Johnson and Alyson Reed, all playing themselves. Further additions to the recurring cast included Kylie Cantrall as Dani, Matthew Sato as Mack, Caitlin Reilly as Quinn, and Vashty Mompoint as Krystal.

=== Filming ===
Production on the first season began on February 15, 2019, in Salt Lake City, Utah. Production on the second season commenced in February 2020, but was halted due to the COVID-19 pandemic. Filming had resumed by November 2020. Filming for the third season began in January 2022 and concluded in April 2022; production of the series relocated from Salt Lake City to Los Angeles. Production returned to Salt Lake City for the filming of the fourth season, which ran from September to December 2022.

The mockumentary style of the series is achieved through the single-camera setup, with handheld cameras used to create shaky footage and zooming. Talking heads are also used; the characters talk directly to the camera to express their inner thoughts. The scenes containing shaky footage and talking heads represent the "present-day" in the story; flashbacks to Nini and Ricky's past relationship are filmed more similarly to other teen drama series.

=== Music ===
The first season's soundtrack contains nine original songs, and one new composition featured in each episode. The majority of songs are performed live by the actors. Some actors played instruments such as a guitar in their performances. Rodrigo wrote an original song for the series, "All I Want", and co-wrote "Just for a Moment" with Bassett and music producer Dan Book. Federle stated that his original pitch included the idea of developing original songs for the series. Steve Vincent, who worked on the original films, served as the musical supervisor for the series and sourced several composers to write new music. He also received submissions from songwriters based in Los Angeles. The soundtrack for the first season, featuring new songs and renditions of songs from the original film, was released on January 10, 2020, by Walt Disney Records. In the lead-up to the release, selected tracks were made available weekly to correlate with the episodes being released.

An album accompanying the holiday special, High School Musical: The Musical: The Holiday Special, was released on November 20, 2020, which includes Christmas music and selected songs as a preview of the second season. As well as both new songs and new versions of songs from the High School Musical franchise, the second season's soundtrack features songs from Beauty and the Beast, written by Alan Menken, Howard Ashman, and Tim Rice. Bassett and Rodrigo both wrote original songs for the second season. The season's soundtrack was released on July 30, 2021, which includes a cover of "Home" by Keegan. The third season's soundtrack features music from the Disney Channel television film Camp Rock as well as the High School Musical franchise and songs from the featured production Frozen. The first song, a cover of "It's On" from Camp Rock 2: The Final Jam, was released as a preview on July 7, 2022, before the season's release. Bassett co-wrote and co-produced an original song, "Finally Free", for the season. Reneé also co-wrote a song for the season, titled "Here I Come", collaborating with songwriters Anthony M. Jones and Steph Jones. The song's lyrics were inspired by her experiences with anxiety. In September 2022, Federle stated that the season would see a return to songs being performed live by the actors within the episodes, which had not occurred during the early period following the COVID-19 pandemic. Music from High School Musical 3: Senior Year was featured in the fourth season, as well as original music.

== Release ==
The first episode of High School Musical: The Musical: The Series was telecast on Disney Channel, ABC, and Freeform on November 8, 2019, ahead of its launch on the streaming service Disney+ on November 12, 2019, in 4K HDR. The preview simulcast of the first episode was viewed by 2.03 million on ABC, in addition to 474,000 on Disney Channel and 293,000 during its Freeform airing. The broadcast received 2.8 million viewers in total. On the streaming service, episodes were released weekly rather than the binge-watching model of all at once. The first-season finale was released on January 10, 2020. High School Musical: The Musical: The Holiday Special, featuring the cast performing Christmas music, was released December 11, 2020; the 45-minute special featured previews of songs and scenes from the second season. Before the release of the second season, Disney Channel aired the complete first season in a marathon format on May 8, 2021. The first season also airs on Disney Channel in Latin America. The second season premiered on May 14, 2021. The season was originally planned to debut in 2020 but was delayed after the COVID-19 pandemic halted filming. The third season premiered on July 27, 2022; episodes were released weekly. The fourth and final season premiered on August 9, 2023; all episodes were released at once.

== Reception ==
=== Critical response ===
The review aggregator website Rotten Tomatoes reported a 76% approval for the first season with an average rating of 7.4/10 based on 33 reviews. The website's critical consensus reads, "Though fans may find what they've been looking for in its nostalgic stylings, High School Musical: The Musical: The Series follows a little too closely in its predecessor's steps to truly be the start of something new." Metacritic, which uses a weighted average, assigned a score of 69 out of 100 based on 27 critics, indicating "generally favorable reviews" for the series as a whole.

Critics commented on the differences between the series and the film, and there was a mixed reaction to the mockumentary format. Vinnie Mancuso of Collider described the series as "endearingly tongue-in-cheek". Kelly Lawler indicated that the series is a "love letter" to high school theater productions in a review for USA Today. Joel Keller of Decider opined that viewing the series did not require an understanding of the original franchise; Caroline Framke of Variety considered some elements of the program too similar to the original film's "two-dimensional" approach. Insider's Libby Torres said the series lacked the "infectious energy" of the original film and found the premise jarring. Mancuso objected to the mockumentary style of the series, arguing that the format distracted from other humor in the episodes. /Film's Ethan Anderton described the technique as "inorganic and unnecessary". Daniel Toy of Tom's Guide felt the talking heads helped avoid unfamiliarity with characters.

The cast's music and dance performances have been commended by critics. Shannon Miller of The A.V. Club praised the cast's talent, in particular, Rodrigo and Bassett for their musical ability and "handling of dramatic material". Writing for Decider, Kayla Cobb stated that the two leads have significant romantic chemistry. Megan Peters of ComicBook.com praised Rodrigo for her portrayal of Nini's guarded personality, and Keller described her as "especially magnetic". Anderton also applauded the cast and suggested that the series does not feature the same "exaggerated acting style" as the source material. The show's choreography was commended, as well as Wylie for her dance capability. Toy noted Rodriguez's comedic timing in his portrayal of Carlos. Anderton, Peters, and Framke likened Kate Reinders's performance as the exuberant Miss Jenn to Kristin Chenoweth.

The series has been likened to Glee for its themes, as well as its combination of music and drama. Framke described the series as a "sweet and very silly version of Glee", and Peters noted similarities through its "quick cuts and quips". Miller considered that High School Musical uses music more as a literal than the abstract element in the storyline. Reviewing the music, Mancuso and Toy expressed interest in the program continuing to provide new songs to complement the original film's soundtrack. Cobb commended the vocal abilities of the main cast and described Rodrigo as "an especially pronounced talent" with a sweet and sincere voice.

=== Accolades ===
Awards and nominations received by High School Musical: The Musical: The Series
Award	Year	Category	Nominee(s)	Result	Ref.
Artios Awards	2021	Outstanding Achievement in Casting: Children's Pilot and Series (Live Action)	Julie Ashton	Nominated	
Artios Awards	2024	Children and Family Pilot and Series – Live Action	Julie Ashton	Nominated	
Artios Awards	2025	Live Action Children & Family Series	Julie Ashton, Jeff Johnson	Nominated	
Children's and Family Emmy Awards	2022	Outstanding Choreography	Zach Woodlee	Nominated	
Children's and Family Emmy Awards	2022	Outstanding Costume Design/Styling	Maria Aguilar	Nominated	
Children's and Family Emmy Awards	2022	Outstanding Lighting Design for a Live Action Program	Chris Reiter	Nominated	
Children's and Family Emmy Awards	2022	Outstanding Makeup and Hairstyling	Shanda Palmer and Heidi Seeholzer	Nominated	
Children's and Family Emmy Awards	2022	Outstanding Young Teen Series	High School Musical: The Musical: The Series	Nominated	
Children's and Family Emmy Awards	2023	Outstanding Casting for a Live Action Program	Julie Ashton	Nominated	
Children's and Family Emmy Awards	2023	Outstanding Choreography	Zach Woodlee	Nominated	
Children's and Family Emmy Awards	2023	Outstanding Costume Design/Styling	Maria Aguilar	Nominated	
Children's and Family Emmy Awards	2023	Outstanding Original Song for a Children's or Young Teen Program	"Finally Free" – Joshua Bassett	Won	
Children's and Family Emmy Awards	2023	Outstanding Original Song for a Children's or Young Teen Program	"You Never Know" – Olivia Rodrigo	Nominated	
Children's and Family Emmy Awards	2023	Outstanding Young Teen Series	High School Musical: The Musical: The Series	Nominated	
Children's and Family Emmy Awards	2024	Outstanding Writing for a Young Teen Program	Nneka Gerstle (for "Admissions")	Nominated	
Children's and Family Emmy Awards	2024	Outstanding Choreography	Zach Woodlee	Won	
Children's and Family Emmy Awards	2024	Outstanding Original Song for a Children's and Young Teen Program	"Speak Out" – Joshua Bassett and Doug Rockwell	Nominated	
Directors Guild of America Awards	2021	Outstanding Directorial Achievement in Children's Programs	Kabir Akhtar (for "Opening Night")	Nominated	
GLAAD Media Award	2020	Outstanding Kids & Family Programming	High School Musical: The Musical: The Series	Won (Note: Also awarded to The Bravest Knight)	
GLAAD Media Award	2022	Outstanding Kids & Family Programming	High School Musical: The Musical: The Series	Nominated	
GLAAD Media Award	2023	Outstanding Kids & Family Programming – Live Action	High School Musical: The Musical: The Series	Nominated	
GLAAD Media Award	2024	Outstanding Kids & Family Programming – Live Action	High School Musical: The Musical: The Series	Nominated	
Imagen Awards	2022	Best Actor – Comedy (Television)	Frankie Rodriguez	Nominated	
Make-Up Artists and Hair Stylists Guild Awards	2022	Best Makeup in Children and Teen Programming	Kimberly Collea, James Cool Benson, Maryann Marchetti	Nominated	
MTV Movie & TV Awards	2022	Best Musical Moment	"The Rose Song" – Olivia Rodrigo	Nominated	
Nickelodeon Kids' Choice Awards	2020	Favorite Male TV Star	Joshua Bassett	Nominated	
Nickelodeon Kids' Choice Awards	2021	Favorite Female TV Star	Sofia Wylie	Nominated	
Nickelodeon Kids' Choice Awards	2021	Favorite Kids TV Show	High School Musical: The Musical: The Series	Nominated	
Nickelodeon Kids' Choice Awards	2021	Favorite Male TV Star	Joshua Bassett	Nominated	
Nickelodeon Kids' Choice Awards	2022	Favorite Female TV Star (Kids)	Olivia Rodrigo	Won	
Nickelodeon Kids' Choice Awards	2022	Favorite Female TV Star (Kids)	Sofia Wylie	Nominated	
Nickelodeon Kids' Choice Awards	2022	Favorite Kids TV Show	High School Musical: The Musical: The Series	Won	
Nickelodeon Kids' Choice Awards	2022	Favorite Male TV Star (Kids)	Joshua Bassett	Won	
Nickelodeon Kids' Choice Awards	2023	Favorite Female TV Star (Kids)	Olivia Rodrigo	Won	
Nickelodeon Kids' Choice Awards	2023	Favorite Female TV Star (Kids)	Sofia Wylie	Nominated	
Nickelodeon Kids' Choice Awards	2023	Favorite Kids TV Show	High School Musical: The Musical: The Series	Nominated	
Nickelodeon Kids' Choice Awards	2023	Favorite Male TV Star (Kids)	Joshua Bassett	Won	
Nickelodeon Kids' Choice Awards	2024	Favorite Female TV Star (Kids)	Olivia Rodrigo	Won	
Nickelodeon Kids' Choice Awards	2024	Favorite Female TV Star (Kids)	Sofia Wylie	Nominated	
Nickelodeon Kids' Choice Awards	2024	Favorite Kids TV Show	High School Musical: The Musical: The Series	Nominated	
Nickelodeon Kids' Choice Awards	2024	Favorite Male TV Star (Kids)	Joshua Bassett	Nominated	
Television Critics Association Awards	2023	Outstanding Achievement in Family Programming	High School Musical: The Musical: The Series	Nominated	
