= High School Musical: The Musical: The Series season 4 =

Season of television series

High School Musical: The Musical: The Series
- Season 4
- Promotional poster
- Starring: Joshua Bassett; Sofia Wylie; Julia Lester; Dara Reneé; Frankie Rodriguez; Liamani Segura; Kate Reinders
- No. of episodes: 8

Release
- Original network: Disney+
- Original release: August 9, 2023

Season chronology
- ← Previous; Season 3

The fourth and final season of High School Musical: The Musical: The Series, an American mockumentary musical drama television series created by Tim Federle, premiered on Disney+, with all eight episodes, on August 9, 2023. In the season, the East High drama club returns to school to learn they will be putting on a stage adaptation of High School Musical 3: Senior Year. Meanwhile, Disney has decided to begin production on the long-awaited High School Musical 4: The Reunion at the school, with the students set to be extras in the film.

This is the only season not to feature Olivia Rodrigo. Kate Reinders, who recurred in the third season, is a part of the main cast once more, while Liamani Segura was promoted to the main cast after also recurring in the third season. Six cast members of the original High School Musical films appeared in this season: Corbin Bleu, Lucas Grabeel, Kaycee Stroh (all of whom appeared in the series prior to the fourth season), Monique Coleman, Alyson Reed, and Bart Johnson.

== Episodes ==
No. overall	No. in season	Title	Directed by	Written by	Original release date
31	1	"High School Musical 4"	Hisham Abed	Tim Federle	August 9, 2023
After ending her relationship with E. J., Gina is implored by her mother to focus on her studies during her junior year. Ricky prepares to begin his senior year at East High with Gina as his new girlfriend, but she asks him to keep their relationship a secret. Miss Jenn announces that their musical production will be an adaption of High School Musical 3: Senior Year, and Emmy plans to audition after enrolling at East High as a freshman. Bart Johnson arrives at East High to announce that High School Musical 4: The Reunion will be filmed at the school, and introduce Mack and Dani, the two teenage stars of the movie. Corbin Bleu apologizes for his involvement in the Frozen documentary, and along with Lucas Grabeel and Monique Coleman, offers the drama students roles as extras in the new film. Miss Jenn clashes with Quinn, the director of the movie, and becomes concerned for the future of her production. Kourtney forms a bond with Dani, who requests that Kourtney provides her with detailed information about Ricky. Meanwhile, Gina has an unfriendly encounter with Mack; however, he unexpectedly requests to follow her on social media.
32	2	"HSM v. HSM"	Kimberly McCullough	Ilana Wolpert	August 9, 2023
The theater students attend their first dance rehearsal for High School Musical 4: The Reunion led by Krystal, the film's choreographer, and Emmy is fired for speaking out of turn. Miss Jenn learns that the auditorium has been occupied by rehearsals for the film; she runs auditions for the High School Musical 3: Senior Year production from the drama room instead. Carlos passes on his duties as assistant director to Emmy due to his busy schedule. Ricky and Gina continue to keep their relationship private, but Ashlyn observes their interactions and discovers the secret. Gina stands in for Dani during a rehearsal and shares an intimate scene with Mack, which leaves Dani feeling threatened. Quinn is unimpressed by Dani's acting ability and identifies a "chemistry problem" between the two teenage leads. At Gina's house, the theater students unveil the cast list for their musical production; Ricky and Gina receive the roles of Troy and Gabriella respectively, but a lack of participating students leaves some roles uncast. Kourtney notices Gina's romantic tension with Mack, before Gina receives an offer from Quinn to replace Dani in the movie.
33	3	"A Star Is Reborn"	Kimberly McCullough	Ann Kim	August 9, 2023
The table-read for the production takes place. Miss Jenn and the theater students immediately notice the chemistry between Ricky and Gina when they perform "Can I Have This Dance?". Jet and Maddox arrive at East High; Jet is revealed to be playing Chad in the musical, and Maddox takes on the position of a student personal assistant for the movie. Gina and the extras begin work at their first day on the set of the film. A scene featuring Alyson Reed is filmed. Maddox and Ashlyn rekindle their friendship but act awkward around each other. Seb begins working in catering for the film, and Carlos tries to make amends with him. Mr. Mazzara returns to East High and provides Ricky and Kourtney with advice about college applications. He then turns to Miss Jenn to seek her advice. Miss Jenn contacts Dani to offer her a role in High School Musical 3: Senior Year, and offers to coach her on her acting. Mack proposes a fake relationship with Gina in order to spark publicity.
34	4	"Trick or Treat"	Ann Marie Pace	Elisabeth Kiernan Averick	August 9, 2023
At a Halloween party, Gina plans to tell Ricky about Mack's plan for a fake relationship. Meanwhile, Miss Jenn has asked Ricky to tell Gina that Dani will now be playing Gabriella in the musical. Gina and Ricky announce to their friends that they are dating, but he is upset to learn that she has not yet told her mother. Miss Jenn spends the night with Ricky's father Mike, but they agree to break up before the night is over. Ashlyn plays Maddox a new song she has written for the musical, and the pair almost share a kiss. Seb tells Carlos that he cheated on him while Carlos was at camp. Ricky calls Gina and asks for them to have a break in their relationship.
35	5	"Admissions"	Ann Marie Pace	Nneka Gerstle	August 9, 2023
Ricky visits E. J. at college after worrying about his relationship and his future. Ricky expresses his fear of losing all of the people around him, and E. J. encourages him to embrace his final months of high school and hold onto the people he cares about. Kourtney also travels to a college in Atlanta and connects with some college students. At East High, the future of the musical becomes uncertain when Principal Gutierrez threatens to shut it due to a lack of participants. Gina convinces Quinn to fast-track the filming of the movie so that she can fully participate as Gabriella in the production. Big Red tells Ashlyn that he cheated on her with Seb over the summer, while Ashlyn tells Big Red about her connection with Maddox; Ashlyn and Big Red break up. Big Red updates Carlos with the news, which leaves Carlos feeling disappointed. Gina realizes she still loves Ricky and tells her mother about her feelings for him. Ricky turns up at Gina's house; they kiss in the rain and they resume their relationship. Principal Gutierrez officially shuts down the musical.
36	6	"Trust the Process"	Kimberly McCullough	Chandler Turk	August 9, 2023
Production on High School Musical 4: The Reunion concludes, and Gina and Ricky learn that the musical production has been canceled. The theater students reminisce on the origins of their drama club. Ashlyn tells the story about how she befriended Kourtney, and how they made a deal to both participate in the musical. Mr. Mazzara recounts his first encounter with Miss Jenn and his previous experience in a boy band. Carlos remembers how he met Miss Jenn and how she supported him through being bullied for his sexuality. Seb reveals that he once dated Natalie Bagley; he and Carlos reunite and resume their relationship. Gina explains how she felt directionless when she first arrived at East High; she had her first encounter with Ricky, and decided to audition for the musical. Miss Jenn tells the story of how she ran into Alyson Reed at a Wicked audition, but she turned down the role to teach at East High. Emmy finds the strength to sing a powerful song. Afterwards, Alyson and Bart agree to contribute their pay from filming the movie towards the theater program in order to save the musical. Ricky is accepted into Salt Lake City College, and Gina receives an offer.
37	7	"The Night of Nights"	Kimberly McCullough	Zach Dodes	August 9, 2023
At a press conference for Quinn's next film, an adaption of Romeo and Juliet, Gina is announced to be starring in the lead role of Juliet alongside Mack as Romeo. Since the movie will be filmed in New Zealand for six months, Gina yearns for Ricky to tell her he loves her. Mr. Mazzara and Miss Jenn both prepare to participate in the opening night performance of High School Musical 3: Senior Year alongside the theater students. During the show, Kourtney learns she has been accepted into Princeton University and Lewis University. Carlos and Seb plan a vacation together, and Seb prepares helps Carlos get ready to meet his father. Miss Jenn receives an offer to play Glinda in a national tour of Wicked. At the conclusion of the first act, Maddox inadvertently damages the auditorium's sound system. Ricky prepares to tell Gina that he loves her, before learning that Gina will be traveling overseas.
38	8	"Born to Be Brave"	Tim Federle	Tim Federle	August 9, 2023
The second act of the musical begins, with Mr. Mazzara managing the sound system and E. J. playing Coach Bolton. Ashlyn admits her feelings for Maddox and the two kiss. E. J. motivates Miss Jenn to pursue her dreams on the Wicked tour, and Miss Jenn suggests that E. J. should be a teacher. Miss Jenn prolongs saying goodbye until she knows all of her students are fulfilled, and ultimately decides that her dream is to stay at East High and continue teaching. Ricky encourages Gina to follow her dreams and film the movie, but she wishes he would fight for her to stay. Gina demands that the movie will be filmed in Salt Lake City so she can remain at East High for the spring musical, and signs the contract. Ricky eventually confesses his love for Gina which she reciprocates with a hidden message in the hat she made for him. Miss Jenn and Mr. Mazzara decide to use the spare tickets to New Zealand and explore a relationship together, while the teens celebrate by going to Denny’s together in a limousine. Kate Reinders leads the cast of High School Musical: The Musical: The Series in an acoustic performance of "For Good".

== Cast and characters ==
=== Main ===
- Joshua Bassett as Ricky Bowen
- Sofia Wylie as Gina Porter
- Dara Reneé as Kourtney Greene
- Julia Lester as Ashlyn Caswell
- Frankie Rodriguez as Carlos Rodriguez
- Liamani Segura as Emmy
- Kate Reinders as Miss Jenn

=== Recurring ===
- Mark St. Cyr as Benjamin Mazzara
- Saylor Bell Curda as Maddox
- Adrian Lyles as Jet
- Napiera Groves Boykin as Terri Porter
- Alex Quijano as Mike Bowen
- Matt Cornett as E.J. Caswell
- Kylie Cantrall as Dani
- Matthew Sato as Mack Alana
- Caitlin Reilly as Quinn Robbins

=== Guest ===
- Corbin Bleu as himself/Chad Danforth
- Monique Coleman as herself/Taylor McKessie
- Kaycee Stroh as herself/Martha Cox
- Alyson Reed as herself/Ms. Darbus
- Bart Johnson as himself/Coach Bolton
- Kimberly Brooks as Michelle Greene
- Gabrielle Elyse as Harper Nolan
- Jason Earles as Dewey Wood
- Vasthy Mompoint as Krystal
- Andrew Barth Feldman as Antoine
- Alexis Nelis as Natalie Bagley
- Beth Lacke as Lynne Bowen

== Production ==
=== Development ===
In May 2022, two months before the third season of High School Musical: The Musical: The Series premiered on Disney+, Disney renewed the series for a fourth season. Four months later, at the 2022 D23 Expo, it was confirmed that the featured musical in the fourth season would be a stage adaptation of the 2008 film High School Musical 3: Senior Year. On returning the story to East High, showrunner Tim Federle stated, "There's something very humbling about returning to school, because all the big things that happen in high school, first love, figuring out your future, parental expectation, it's all so big for these characters this season that I'm really excited to be back." On the meta nature of the season, Federle would later state, "It's like Inception with jazz hands at this point. I think there are Easter eggs in every episode."

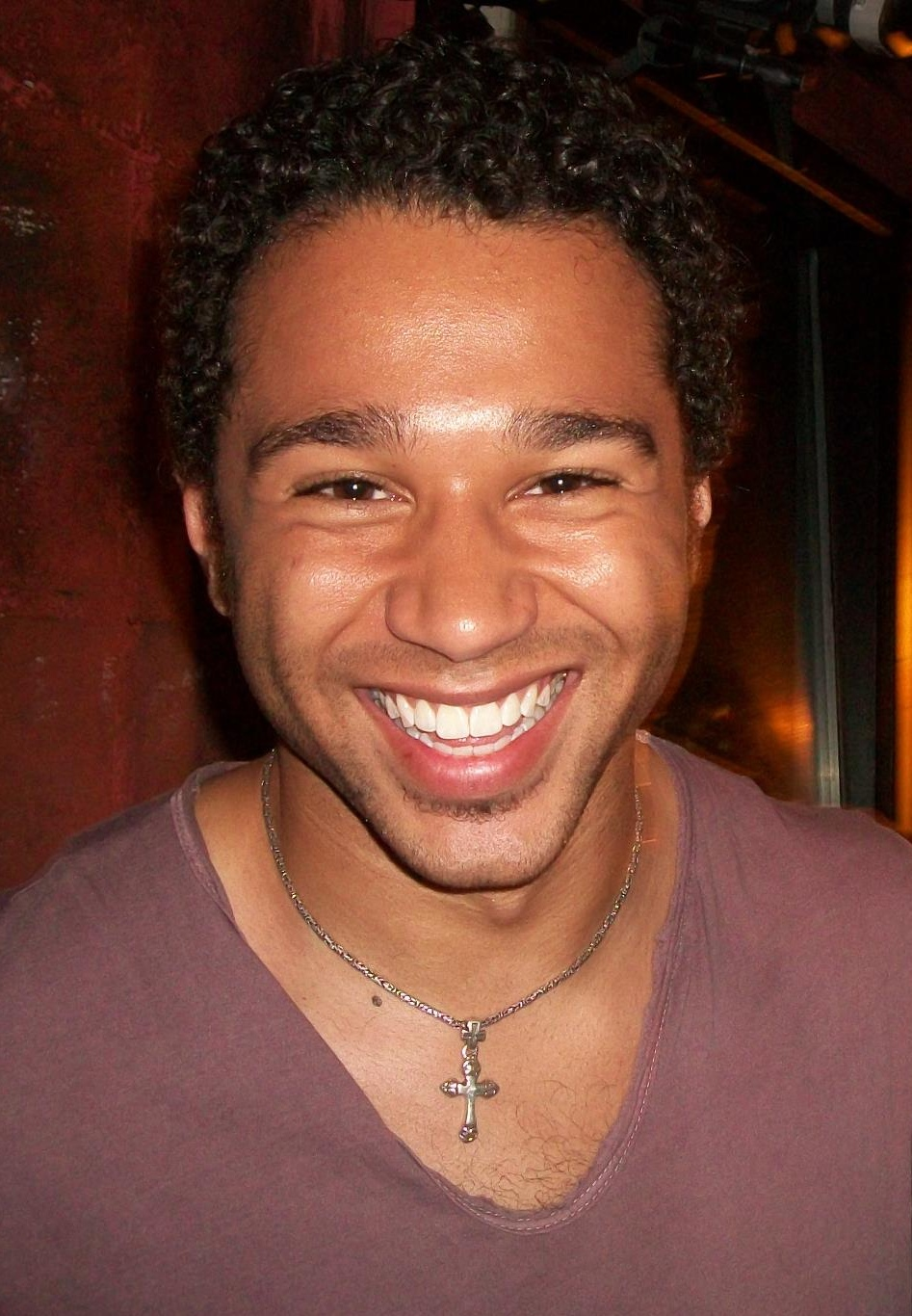
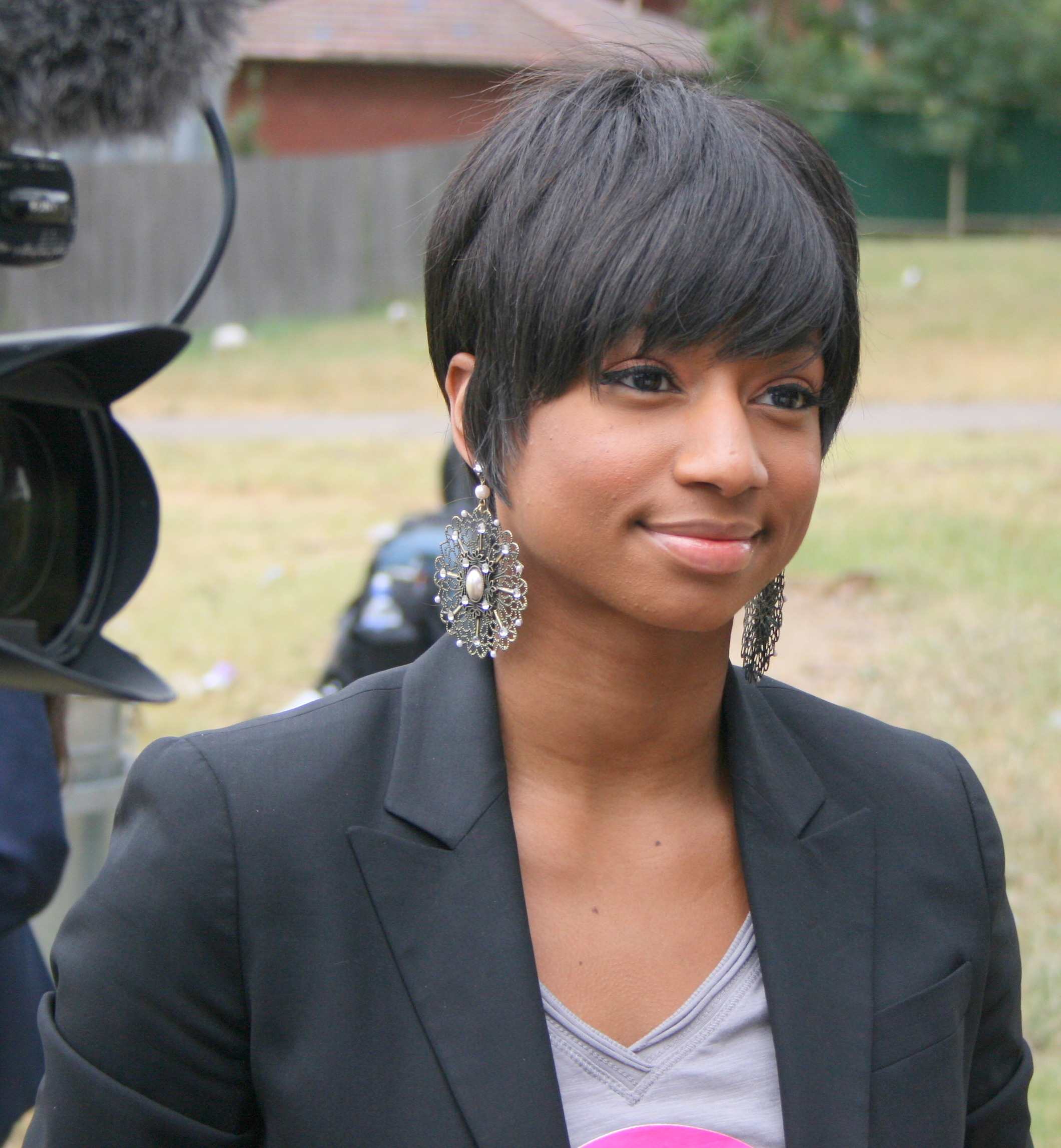
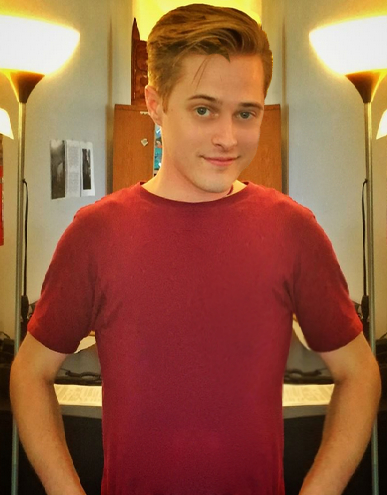
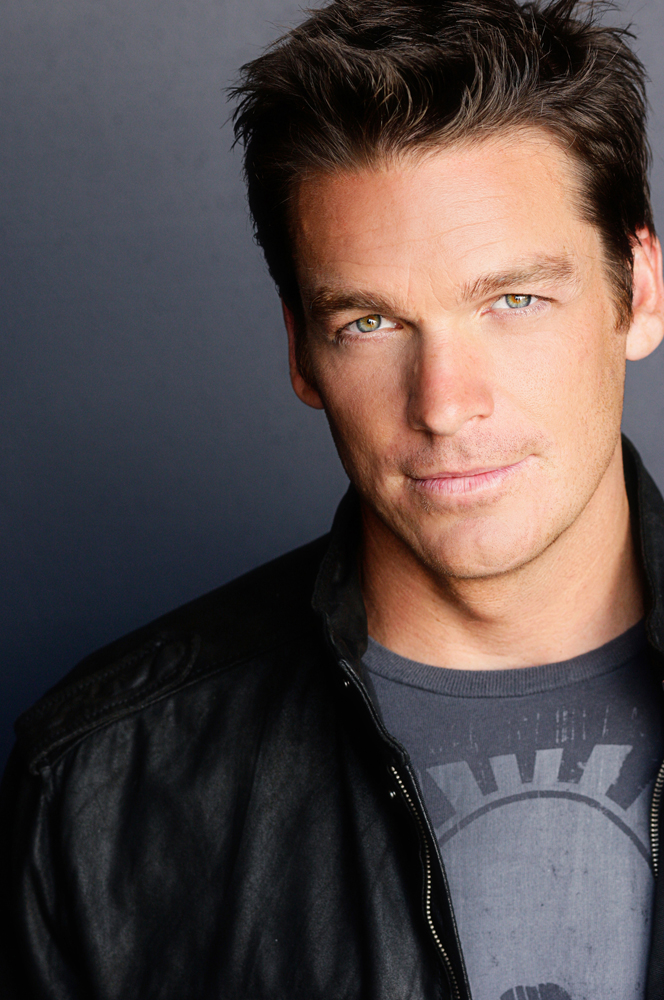
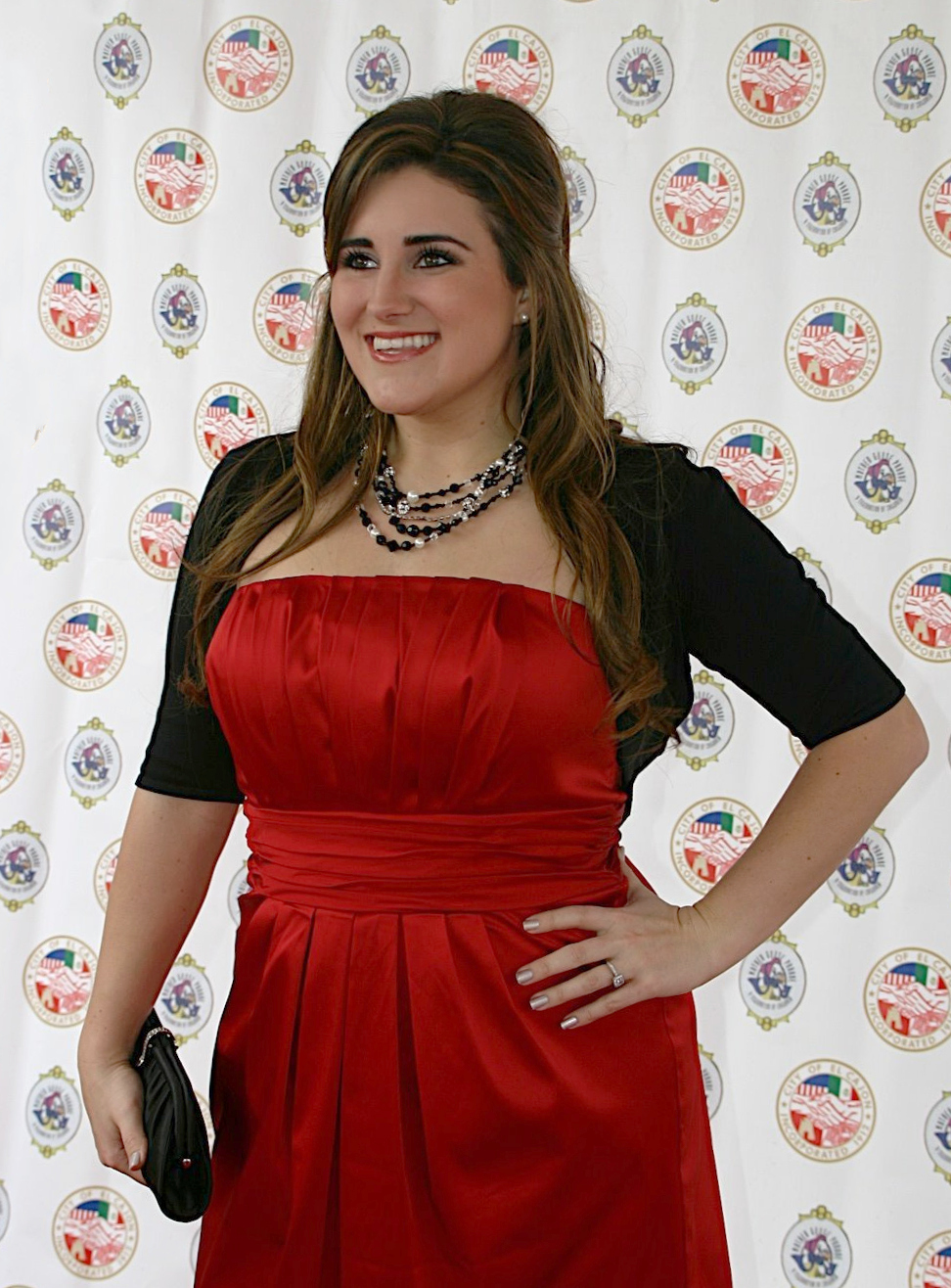
From top, L to R, Corbin Bleu, Monique Coleman, Lucas Grabeel, Bart Johnson, Kaycee Stroh, and Alyson Reed, who all played versions of themselves reprising their respective High School Musical characters Chad Danforth, Taylor McKessie, Ryan Evans, Coach Bolton, Martha Cox, and Ms. Darbus.

According to star Sofia Wylie, Federle would take input from the cast themselves on their own character storylines. "[Tim] is so inclusive and really wants myself and the rest of the cast to have an input and a say in what we hope to see this coming season," she told People. "He's just such a wonderful collaborator and I'm very lucky for him." This season sees Ricky beginning a relationship with Gina, something teased since the first season. Discussing this relationship, Bassett told People, "They're both really nervous about getting it right. It’s fun to see [them] in this light and actually see them in a healthy relationship because I think both of them have had pretty not great relationships." On the character arcs of Kourtney and Ashlyn, Federle teased that "Kourtney is going through these massive decisions about wanting it all as a college student...[and] Ashlyn goes on a journey where she discovers her own queerdom in the series. Those are all things we're able to address in a way that I think celebrates the original franchise but puts a stamp on it in our own way."

=== Casting ===
Much of the main cast from the third season were expected to return for the fourth. Kate Reinders would again be part of the main cast after recurring in the third season, while Liamani Segura, who also recurred in the third season, would be promoted to the main cast. Federle also teased that other cast members from the third season could appear in the fourth season.

In September 2022, it was confirmed that film series stars Lucas Grabeel, Kaycee Stroh and Corbin Bleu would be returning to the series, with Monique Coleman, Alyson Reed and Bart Johnson joining them. All six are expected to play fictionalized versions of themselves reprising their High School Musical roles for a fictional High School Musical 4 film. Federle also stated that an invitation was sent to other original cast members to join the series. He also later said, "Now it's a matter of juggling and holding my breath and praying and lighting candles and seeing who wants to come play with us. So I have high hopes, but I can tell you we've engaged a lot of people and it's gonna be a really exciting season." On her appearance in the series, Coleman said, "It was such an amazing experience, just being back with Corbin [Bleu], Lucas [Grabeel], Kaycee [Stroh] and Alyson [Reed] just to return to the place where our lives changed so drastically. To be there with an entirely new group of young people that are embodying this story in their own ways, was just such a fun experience." She also said that the season would be "nostalgia city."

That same month, it was also confirmed that four new cast members would join the series: Kylie Cantrall, Matthew Sato, Caitlin Reilly, and Vasthy Mompoint were cast as Dani, Mack, Quinn and Krystal, respectively. On Cantrall's character Dani, she told People, "She likes the spotlight and when she wants something, she goes and gets it, even if it means stepping on people's toes a little bit." Sato teased his character Mack would develop "a really interesting relationship" with Gina as the season progresses.

The season's first teaser in June 2023 confirmed the return of Mark St. Cyr, Matt Cornett, Larry Saperstein, Joe Serafini, Adrian Lyles and Saylor Bell Curda, reprising their series roles as Benjamin Mazzara, E.J. Caswell, Big Red, Seb Matthew-Smith, Maddox and Jet, respectively. Furthermore, the release of the final trailer in July 2023 confirmed the appearance of Kimberly Brooks as Michelle Greene, a role in which she recurred in the second season. A preview clip on July 25, 2023 revealed Scott Hoying's appearance as Ryan's on-screen partner in High School Musical 4: The Reunion.

In the fictional High School Musical 4: The Reunion film, Bleu, Coleman, Grabeel, Johnson, Stroh, and Reed reprise their respective High School Musical film series roles as Chad Danforth, Taylor McKessie, Ryan Evans, Coach Bolton, Martha Cox, and Ms. Darbus. In addition, the current drama club are extras in the film, with Gina and Mack's characters appearing to be a couple.

=== Filming ===
Filming for the fourth season began on September 23, 2022, in Salt Lake City, returning to East High for the first time since 2021. Production concluded by December 21, 2022.

=== Music ===
Songs from High School Musical 3: Senior Year were performed, as well as original music. The season also marked a return to live performing on set, something that had not been done since the first season due to the COVID-19 pandemic. A preview song, titled "High School Reunion", was released on July 25, 2023. The season finale is titled after and features a performance of "Born to Be Brave", a song that originally appeared in season one. A post-credits scene in the finale episode features Reinders and the cast performing "For Good" from the musical Wicked.

== Release ==
The fourth season was released in its entirety on August 9, 2023; the release date was announced in June 2023. Included in the announcement was the news that it would be the series' last. A final trailer was released in July 2023, with a preview clip of the first episode releasing on July 25.

== Reception ==
=== Critical response ===
The review aggregator website Rotten Tomatoes reported a 100% approval rating based on 10 reviews.
