= High School Musical: The Musical: The Series season 3 =

Season of television series

High School Musical: The Musical: The Series
- Season 3
- Promotional poster
- Starring: Joshua Bassett; Sofia Wylie; Matt Cornett; Julia Lester; Dara Reneé; Frankie Rodriguez; Saylor Bell Curda; Adrian Lyles
- No. of episodes: 8

Release
- Original network: Disney+
- Original release: July 27 – September 14, 2022

Season chronology
- ← Previous; Season 2 Next → Season 4

The third season of High School Musical: The Musical: The Series, an American mockumentary musical drama streaming television series created by Tim Federle, premiered on Disney+ on July 27, 2022; the season consisted of 8 episodes that released weekly until September 14. The series itself is inspired by the High School Musical film series.

In this season, some of the East High drama club spend their summer at Camp Shallow Lake, which is putting on an adaptation of the 2013 film Frozen, and become the subjects of a Disney+ documentary directed by Corbin Bleu. Meanwhile, Nini sets a course for her future.

Much of the main cast from the first two seasons returns. Mark St. Cyr, who was a main cast member in the first two seasons, does not appear in this season, while fellow main cast members Olivia Rodrigo and Kate Reinders recur, and Larry Saperstein and Joe Serafini guest star. This is the first main cast appearance of Saylor Bell Curda and Adrian Lyles, and the final appearance of Rodrigo. The series was renewed for a fourth season by Disney+ in May 2022, which was later confirmed to be the final season in June 2023.

== Episodes ==
No. overall	No. in season	Title	Directed by	Written by	Original release date
23	1	"Happy Campers"	Kimberly McCullough	Zach Dodes	July 27, 2022
Gina, E. J., Ashlyn, Kourtney and Carlos arrive in California to attend Camp Shallow Lake for two weeks over the summer, excited to discover the mystery celebrity who will be attending. The friends meet Maddox, a Counselor-in-Training, and Jet, a mysterious newcomer to the camp. Gina and E. J. have been dating, (Note: Since the end of the season 2 episode "Second Chances".) and Gina has ambitions of auditioning for the lead in the camp musical, which is revealed to be Frozen. Corbin Bleu appears at the camp as a celebrity guest, to announce plans of filming the rehearsal process to make a documentary series, which he will host. When camp director Dewey Wood realizes that Corbin will not be the director of the musical, he recruits E. J. to fulfil the role. Ricky has been spending time with Lily, but after discovering the stolen harness in her possession, (Note: Stolen by her in the season 2 episode "Showtime".) he rejects the trip with her family, and decides to attend camp with his friends. Gina and E. J. are shocked when Ricky arrives on the first night of camp. Meanwhile, Nini meets up with Miss Jenn to seek inspiration for her songwriting, before embarking on a road trip with her mothers to Southern California.
24	2	"Into the Unknown"	Kimberly McCullough	Ilana Wolpert	August 3, 2022
The campers prepare for the musical auditions; Gina sets out to make a name for herself, but Kourtney and Ashlyn fear that she has reverted to her self-important ways. (Note: During the events of season 1.) The girls also discuss their first impressions of Maddox, and feel as if there is more to her than what they know. Gina tries to adjust to Ricky's arrival at camp and the pair agree to make a fresh start in their friendship. (Note: Strained since the events of season 2.) Gina also becomes jealous of E. J.'s friendship with Val, an ex-camper who becomes the choreographer of the musical. Val takes over E. J.'s task of the casting auditions as he comes to terms with his new responsibility. Ricky makes a connection with Jet, and discovers he no longer sings; however, Jet sings at the audition and makes a lasting impression. Carlos sneaks a look at the cast list and is shocked by his discovery. Meanwhile, Nini's mothers arrange for her to meet with their family friend Marvin, who she discovers is her biological father. Nini learns her mothers and Marvin had a hit song as a band in their youth, which inspires her to sing "You Never Know".
25	3	"The Woman in the Woods"	Angela Tortu	Natalia Castells-Esquivel	August 10, 2022
The Frozen cast list is posted, revealing the lead roles of Gina as Anna, Kourtney as Elsa, and Ricky as Kristoff. E. J. is shocked to discover that Val has cast him as Sven the reindeer in addition to his director roles. He finds his directorial duties demanding and begins to pull away from his friends. Maddox takes the group out on an overnight camping trip tradition to initiate the new attendees. E. J. leads a camp song called "Ballad of Susan Fine", and Maddox tells a ghost story, but struggles to gain everyone's attention as Jet makes jokes out of each sentence she says. Maddox and Jet have a confrontation, revealing that they are siblings. While on an expedition to explore the camp legend, Ricky and Gina bond. Ashlyn comes to terms with being cast in the ensemble as opposed to a lead role; she begins to question her identity and writes a song titled "Rising".
26	4	"No Drama"	Angela Tortu	Nneka Gerstle	August 17, 2022
E. J. endeavours to ensure Corbin Bleu's latest visit does not result in any drama, while the crew begin filming the rehearsal process. The first read-through takes place, and Channing persuades Corbin to create drama between the campers for the documentary. Jet does not turn up, and it is discovered he has left camp; he later returns and Val encourages him to prove he is irreplaceable. The documentary crew arrange a performance of "Love Is an Open Door", and while Ricky is eager to sing with Gina, E. J. steps in for the role of Hans. Gina's mother calls to say she is moving back to Salt Lake City, while E. J. receives a letter from his father, who has plans of him attending a school in St. Louis. E. J. confides in Val about the letter after he notices the connection between Ricky and Gina; the crew decide to pursue this tension as a focus point of the documentary. E. J. agrees to create drama for Corbin, which begins when a rift is made between Gina and Val in relation to the letter. Meanwhile, Kourtney calls her mother to discuss her anxieties, and Maddox begins to notice Ashlyn's fixation on Val.
27	5	"The Real Campers of Shallow Lake"	Ann Marie Pace	Jessica Leventhal	August 24, 2022
The campers begin to implement the conventions of reality television to create drama within their production, and increase the documentary's appeal to Corbin. Carlos leads the group in improvisational activities to stage fictional conflict between the cast. However, the camera crew capture Gina's real emotions and concerns about E. J.'s friendship with Val. Alex and Emmy rehearse "A Little Bit of You", followed by Gina and Ricky singing "What Do You Know About Love?", with the performers initiating false disagreements in the meantime. More of the cast notice Gina and Ricky's connection, while Gina confronts E. J. about keeping his move to St. Louis a secret from her. Channing is pleased with the content he has filmed, but the fictional drama transcends the rehearsals and becomes real; the group ultimately learn that Maddox and Jet are siblings. Maddox talks to Ashlyn about the romantic feelings she suspects Ashlyn has for Val, and Kourtney becomes self-conscious of her anxieties. Ricky admits his feelings for Gina to Carlos, but it is caught on camera. Jet sings "Right Place". E. J. makes a phone call.
28	6	"Color War"	Christine Lakin	Chandler Turk	August 31, 2022
A color war begins and the campers are split into two teams: the blue team (E. J., Ricky, Ashlyn and Gina), and the yellow team (Maddox, Kourtney, Carlos and Jet). The campers compete in sporting games and athletic competitions throughout the day. E. J.'s phone call results in Miss Jenn arriving at camp to provide him with tips for the directing of Frozen. Ashlyn continues questioning her emotions and seeks advice from Miss Jenn, later admitting to herself her feelings towards Val. E. J. fights to maintain his relationship with Gina, while Ricky continues to bond with her. Ricky ultimately helps Gina to arrange a romantic promposal for E. J., but he rejects her offer. The day concludes with a sing-off performance of "It's On", which leads the yellow team to win the competition. As a result, Maddox and Jet make steps to begin resolving their conflict. Ricky decides to help Jet by forming a plan to reunite Maddox with her girlfriend Madison, who she broke up with at the previous year's camp prom.
29	7	"Camp Prom"	Kimberly McCullough	Zach Dodes	September 7, 2022
Preparations for the camp prom begin. Ashlyn decides she definitely has feelings for Val, and Carlos welcomes her to the LGBTQ+ community; Seb arrives at camp to attend with Carlos. As part of Jet's plan, Madison also arrives and apologizes for breaking up with Maddox. Maddox and Jet sing "Wouldn't Change a Thing" at the prom and resolve their conflict. Maddox and Madison agree to reignite their connection, but Maddox begins to notice Ashlyn in a new light. E. J.'s preparations for the following day's production makes him forget about his promise to dance with Gina, which leaves her feeling deflated. Gina believes that E.J. can't commit to something. She ultimately decides that his distractions have made their differences apparent, and decides to break up with him. Ricky fears that footage containing his confession of feelings for Gina will soon be made public; he plans to tell her, but after learning about the breakup, decides not to. Kourtney's anxiety intensifies on the night before the production; she sings "Here I Come" and draws upon her strength to carry on. E. J. braces for Corbin's return and opening night of the show.
30	8	"Let It Go"	Kimberly McCullough	Tim Federle	September 14, 2022
Ricky's birthday falls on the same day as opening night; Big Red, Miss Jenn and Nini arrive to view the production. Nini tells Miss Jenn that she will be permanently moving to California. Maddox asks Ashlyn if she plans to tell Big Red about her new preferences, before Big Red reaffirms his feelings for her. Emmy sings "This Is Me" while summoning the confidence for the performance. The production begins, as it is live-streamed over the internet. Alex helps Kourtney to manage her anxiety throughout the night before she performs "Let It Go". Channing's attempts to derail the production only strengthen the performance; Corbin dismisses Channing and insists that the filming has concluded. Corbin sings "Everyday" with the cast after the show. One month later, at the premiere of the documentary, the campers are shocked with how they have been portrayed on screen, which is also a surprise to Corbin. Ashlyn and the others learn that Big Red is bisexual. Everyone feels shocked and has mixed feelings after the premiere. E.J. feels betrayed at how Ricky has feelings for Gina when they were dating as portrayed in the premiere. Gina and Ricky reveal their feelings for each other and they share a kiss.

== Cast and characters ==
=== Main ===
- Joshua Bassett as Ricky Bowen
- Sofia Wylie as Gina Porter
- Matt Cornett as E. J. Caswell
- Julia Lester as Ashlyn Caswell
- Dara Reneé as Kourtney Greene
- Frankie Rodriguez as Carlos Rodriguez
- Saylor Bell Curda as Maddox
- Adrian Lyles as Jet

=== Recurring ===
- Jason Earles as Dewey Wood
- Corbin Bleu as a fictionalized version of himself
- Ben Stillwell as Channing
- Meg Donnelly as Val
- Aria Brooks as Alex
- Liamani Segura as Emmy
- Kate Reinders as Miss Jenn
- Olivia Rodrigo as Nini Salazar-Roberts

=== Guest ===
- Joe Serafini as Seb Matthew-Smith
- Larry Saperstein as Big Red
- Jesse Tyler Ferguson as Marvin
- JoJo Siwa as Madison
- Kimberly Brooks as Michelle Greene
- Olivia Rose Keegan as Lily
- Nicole Sullivan as Carol
- Michelle Noh as Dana

== Production ==
=== Development ===
In September 2021, two months after the second season concluded on Disney+, High School Musical: The Musical: The Series was renewed for a third season. Fans began to speculate that the musical would center around the Disney Channel Original Movie Camp Rock; however, in November of that year, the musical was revealed to be the stage adaptation of the 2013 film Frozen. On the camp setting for the third season, Federle stated, "We are overjoyed to be heading to the great outdoors for season three, and grateful to our partners and friends at Disney+ for their continued support of our next-generation Wildcats." He would further tell RadioTimes.com, "We wanted a big fun, summery, sunny season, that would just be good vibes. For the audience that was with us in season 2, that was in some ways a darker, more dramatic season, shot during the height of COVID. I think we were all looking for both a location change for the morale of the cast, but also the storytelling possibilities and opportunities when you get to go somewhere, like a summer camp where anything could happen, is just so fun and juicy." Federle stated the decision to have the season take place at summer camp was due largely to the COVID-19 pandemic, adding "We had a real plan for, which was: If we do Frozen, [Joshua Bassett] can sing Kristoff's lullaby, [Dara Reneé] is gonna inspire young Black princesses everywhere when they see her sing, 'Let It Go,' Sofia Wylie is gonna get to play a lighter side of Gina as Anna. There was such a plan to return to our roots of a group of theater kids putting on a show."

The season also sees Sofia Wylie's character Gina in a deteriorating relationship with Matt Cornett's character EJ, which leads to the beginning of her rekindled friendship and eventual relationship with Joshua Bassett's character Ricky, something that has been teased since the first season. On the relationship between Gina and EJ, Cornett said, "I think Gina means a lot to EJ, no matter the circumstances...I think that's something that will always weigh heavy on him is, is trying to, you know, make sure that he's still able to be around his friends and be around this girl that means so much to him." On the friendship between her and Ricky, Federle noted "They're both outsiders. Ricky was a skater, Gina was the new girl, and they accidentally have a lot in common once they put aside their differences." With the release of the season finale "Let It Go," Gina finally confesses her feelings for Ricky and the two share a kiss. On making this decision, Federle stated, "Well, the night of Homecoming changed everything for the characters, for me as a writer...when Sofia Wylie leaned over and kissed Josh [Bassett]'s cheek in the back of that orange Bug, that changed the entire series. So the short answer is, I don't know when I wrote the pilot if I thought Gina and Ricky would kiss in the season finale of season 3, but from Homecoming on, this was the plan."

Both Julia Lester's character Ashlyn and Larry Saperstein's character Big Red come out this season, something that was asked for by both Lester and Saperstein since the first season. According to Federle, he learned at D23 in 2019 that the actors wanted LGBT storylines, in which he said "So it's kind of funny how the show sometimes imitates the actors' thoughts or lives or dreams. It's cool to be writing for Disney in an era where I feel like I'm free to tell these kinds of stories."

=== Casting ===
Much of the main cast returned for the third season, with Kate Reinders and Olivia Rodrigo recurring, Joe Serafini and Larry Saperstein guest starring, and Mark St. Cyr not appearing. This would also be the final appearance for Rodrigo on the show. On her limited appearance in this season and eventual exit from the series, Federle said, "I think [Nini's] ready to explore the world outside the halls of East High...and so this season it's about trying to give her character a proper sendoff while also leaving room for other characters to really step into the fray and step into the spotlight."

In January 2022, Corbin Bleu, Meg Donnelly, Jason Earles, Saylor Bell Curda, and Adrian Lyles were cast as a fictionalized version of himself, Val, Dewey Wood, Maddox, and Jet respectively. Bleu, Donnelly and Earles would be cast in recurring roles, while Bell Curda and Lyles would be part of the main cast. In March 2022, Ben Stillwell, Aria Brooks and Liamani Segura were cast in recurring roles as Channing, Alex and Emmy respectively. With the release of the official trailer in June 2022, Jesse Tyler Ferguson and JoJo Siwa were revealed to be part of the cast, guest starring as Marvin and Madison respectively. The release of the first episode on July 27, 2022 revealed that Olivia Rose Keegan would return to guest star as Lily, and a week later, the second episode confirmed the returns of Nicole Sullivan and Michelle Noh to guest star as Nini's mothers Carol and Dana respectively.

For the in-show production of Frozen, Gina was cast as Anna with Emmy cast as a young Anna, Kourtney was cast as Elsa with Alex cast as a young Elsa, Ricky was cast as Kristoff, E.J. was cast as Sven, Carlos was cast as Olaf, and Jet was cast as Hans, with Ashlyn being part of the ensemble. On casting Kourtney as Elsa and Gina as Anna, Federle noted, "I felt really strongly that [Dara Reneé] as Elsa would be so powerful. And then to have [Sofia Wylie] as Anna — because Sofia's so funny, and a lot of people don't always get to see that side of her — would be a really beautiful combination.” He would go on to add, "While I feel that romantic love is something that's at the center of a lot of shows, I also think not enough is said about camaraderie and sisterhood among young women, who the media often tries to pit against each other. Frozen was chosen for those themes, plus the music's incredible. It was fun to stretch outside of our High School Musical universe."

=== Filming ===
Filming for the third season had begun by January 18, 2022. Production would take place in Los Angeles as opposed to Salt Lake City to match the summer camp setting, a detail first revealed with the announcement of the renewal. Production officially wrapped on April 19, 2022.

=== Music ===
Once more, Joshua Bassett wrote a song for the soundtrack, as did Dara Reneé. Bassett co-wrote "Finally Free" with Doug Rockwell and Tova Litvin, while Reneé co-wrote "Here I Come" with Steph Jones and Anthony M. Jones. Olivia Rodrigo makes her final musical contribution to the series: an original song titled "You Never Know". The soundtrack was released digitally on all music streaming services on September 15, 2022, followed by a physical release by Target the following day.

== Reception ==
=== Critical response ===
The review aggregator website Rotten Tomatoes reported a 100% approval rating based on 4 reviews.

Bruce Miller of the Sioux City Journal wrote, "It isn't a huge twist on the summer formula, but it does have enough variety to suggest this season could produce a couple more breakout stars. Watch closely and an even bigger game is figuring out who will come back to visit a decade from now." Diego Peralta of Cultured Vultures stated, "The third season of High School Musical: The Musical: The Series is a joyful return for the teens of East High. With an interesting new place for summer adventures, heartwarming friendships between the characters, and emotional musical numbers, the Wildcats continue to be a lot of fun." Tessa Smith of Mama's Geeky wrote, "Tim Federle, the musical genius behind this show has done it yet again. As each episode comes to an end fans will be begging for more. With the gang putting on a production of Frozen at camp, things get interesting. Having only seen the first three episodes, we are already hooked and cannot wait to see how it all plays out."
