= High School Musical: The Musical: The Series season 1 =

Season of television series

High School Musical: The Musical: The Series
- Season 1
- Promotional poster
- Starring: Olivia Rodrigo; Joshua Bassett; Matt Cornett; Sofia Wylie; Larry Saperstein; Julia Lester; Dara Reneé; Frankie Rodriguez; Mark St. Cyr; Kate Reinders
- No. of episodes: 10

Release
- Original network: Disney+
- Original release: November 8, 2019 (Note: The first episode premiered on ABC, Disney Channel and Freeform on November 8, 2019, serving as a simulcast preview before its release on Disney+ on November 12.) – January 10, 2020

Season chronology
- Next → Season 2

The first season of High School Musical: The Musical: The Series, an American mockumentary musical drama streaming television created by Tim Federle, premiered on Disney Channel, ABC, and Freeform as a preview simulcast on November 8, 2019, ahead of its premiere on Disney+ on November 12. The season consisted of 10 episodes, which released weekly until January 10, 2020. The series itself is inspired by the High School Musical film series.

In this season, the East High drama club is formed and auditions begin for the school's production of High School Musical. As the students begin to build relationships with each other, they must learn to work together to succeed.

In October 2019, before the season premiered, Disney+ renewed the series for a second season.

== Episodes ==
No. overall	No. in season	Title	Directed by	Written by	Original release date
1	1	"The Auditions"	Tamra Davis	Tim Federle	November 8, 2019
Ricky returns to school for the new year to discover that his former girlfriend, Nini, is now dating E. J., whom she met at a theater camp over the summer. On her first day as the new drama teacher at East High, Miss Jenn announces that the school will be staging a production of High School Musical: The Musical. Mr. Mazzara, East High's STEM teacher, warns Miss Jenn of the need to be professional while at work. Nini is inspired to audition for the musical after typically participating as a chorus member; and Ricky decides to audition in an attempt to impress Nini and rekindle their relationship. Nini meets transfer student Gina, who intimidates her with her dance skills. Nini boldly auditions for the role of Gabriella by singing "Start of Something New", while Ricky auditions for Troy by singing the song that Nini previously wrote for him as a declaration of her love; "I Think I Kinda, You Know". Upset, Nini confronts Ricky, before the cast list is posted, revealing Ricky and Nini in the lead roles of Troy and Gabriella respectively.
2	2	"The Read-Through"	Tamra Davis	Oliver Goldstick	November 15, 2019
Miss Jenn starts rehearsals for the musical with a cast read-through of the script. Nini tries to avoid Ricky, as she is unimpressed that he auditioned to get closer to her, rather than for the benefit of the production. Nini criticizes Ricky for not taking the production seriously, which leads him to contemplate quitting. However, Gina convinces Ricky to continue participating in the hope that his romantic attempts cause Nini to quit, allowing her to assume the role of Gabriella. This backfires when Nini is impressed by Ricky's newfound efforts to practice the dance routines. E. J. is jealous of Ricky being cast as Troy, and after suspecting that Ricky has been messaging Nini behind his back, he plans to steal Nini's phone and check her messages. EJ convinces his cousin Ashlyn to steal Nini's phone on E. J.'s behalf, and offers an alliance; to help him remove Ricky from the musical so that he can play Troy opposite Nini. Meanwhile, Miss Jenn acquires a prop from the original film, Gabriella's phone, to be displayed throughout the show's run.
3	3	"The Wonderstudies"	Tamra Davis	Zach Dodes	November 22, 2019
In possession of Nini's phone, E. J. listens to a heartfelt voicemail that Ricky leaves for her and deletes it before returning the phone to lost and found out of guilt. Nini arrives late to rehearsals after Gina reschedules the session, aware that Nini would not receive the update. Nini feels intimidated when Gina choreographs a complicated dance routine, and steals some of her belongings in retaliation, believing Gina stole her phone. E. J. convinces Nini to return the items, and writes a song for her, "A Billion Sorrys", when he realizes he must confess his own actions. After E. J. hints that he listened to the voicemail, Ricky inadvertently reveals to Nini that E. J. stole her phone. Meanwhile, Mr. Mazzara confronts Miss Jenn about the prop phone she acquired, finding a receipt for her purchase of the item online after she claimed it was a gift from the original film's cast members. Mr. Mazzara rebukes Miss Jenn when he discovers she was merely an extra in the film and suggests her position at the school was awarded based on the false claim that she had a larger role. He pressures her to inform her students.
4	4	"Blocking"	Chad Lowe	Margee Magee	November 29, 2019
Nini confronts E. J. about stealing her phone; he expresses his belief that she still has feelings for Ricky. The pair argue before a blocking rehearsal, which results in the pair singing a strained rendition of "What I've Been Looking For" with E. J. stepping in for his understudy role. Miss Jenn disapproves of the cast not taking rehearsals seriously and implores the students to resolve their personal issues. E. J. tries to apologize, but Nini blocks his phone number, deciding to break up with him. Ricky's mother returns home to reveal that she and his father are separating and that she will be moving to Chicago. Ricky is discernibly hurt by the news and plans to stay at his best friend Big Red's house for the night, before relocating to Nini's house after speaking with her mother, Carol. Nini comforts Ricky, and the two share a romantic moment before she discovers that he has left the house. Nini laments the loss of her relationship and resurfacing feelings for Ricky, by writing the song "All I Want". Meanwhile, Gina devises a new plan to claim the lead role, by convincing E. J. to become her date to the upcoming homecoming dance.
5	5	"Homecoming"	Joanna Kerns	Tim Federle	December 6, 2019
Nini decides to miss the homecoming dance and spend the night with Kourtney and Miss Jenn to prevent her from overthinking her recent breakup. Miss Jenn attempts to reignite Nini's focus on the production and encourages her to have more confidence in herself at a karaoke lounge. Miss Jenn meets Ricky's father Mike during the night and a romantic connection is instigated between the two. Carlos, the drama club's choreographer, assists Seb, who will be playing Sharpay, in rehearsing the dance routine for "Bop to the Top" and the pair arrange to attend the upcoming dance together. Although Carlos is initially disheartened when it appears that Seb has stood him up, the two begin a relationship when Seb merely arrives late. Gina takes E. J. as her date to the dance in the hope that the unwanted drama would force Nini to quit her role, and is disheartened when the plan doesn't work out. Ricky scolds Gina for taking advantage of E. J., and after apologizing, he drives her home and the pair bond. Miss Jenn checks her phone to find missed calls and messages from Principal Gutierrez, who arranges an urgent meeting as a result of her neglecting her chaperone duties for the dance.
6	6	"What Team?"	Kimberly McCullough & Joanna Kerns	Oliver Goldstick	December 13, 2019
Miss Jenn is indefinitely suspended from her position after Principal Gutierrez discovers she lied about her teaching experience and credential during the application process. Carlos is forced to act as stand-in for Miss Jenn's directing duties and delivers the news to the cast when the pressure becomes unendurable. The students discuss the positive impact that Miss Jenn has had on their schooling lives and decide to stand up for her. They band together to stage and rehearse a performance of the song "Truth, Justice and Songs in Our Key" at the school board meeting to convince the panel to continue employing Miss Jenn. The presentation proves successful and Miss Jenn's position is reinstated. At the meeting, Miss Jenn discovers that Mike is Ricky's father. Meanwhile, Nini becomes jealous of Ricky's newfound friendship with Gina when she witnesses him sing an acoustic version of "When There Was Me and You" to her. E. J. decides to clear his conscience by confessing his secrets and lies to Nini.
7	7	"Thanksgiving"	Kimberly McCullough	Ann Kim	December 20, 2019
Over the holiday break for Thanksgiving, Ashlyn, E. J's cousin, arranges a party for the theater students. Ricky calls his mother and discovers she is in a new relationship with a different man, and Gina empathizes with Ricky based on her own family's struggles. Nini makes an effort to connect with Gina at the party before Gina's mother calls to tell her she has been redeployed for work and they will be moving again. Big Red bonds with Ashlyn after he learns she is the co-captain of the robotics team. Ashlyn encourages Nini to write a song about herself rather than her relationships, leading her to compose "Out of the Old", and consider applying for a performing arts school based in Denver. E. J. discovers that he has lost a significant amount of his social media following after he continues confessing to his immoral behavior. Meanwhile, Miss Jenn and Mr. Mazzara unexpectedly meet at school during the night to work on their respective extracurricular projects. The pair assist each other in their attempts, and they spend the rest of the night together at the school. They fall asleep watching a movie while an outlet sparks in the workshop.
8	8	"The Tech Rehearsal"	Joanna Kerns	Natalia Castells-Esquivel	December 27, 2019
The cast discovers that the East High theater was damaged by a fire over the holiday, leaving them unable to undertake rehearsals. Carlos arranges for the production to be hosted at the abandoned El Rey Theater downtown. Miss Jenn leads a technical rehearsal, but is hesitant to work at the theater due to an unpleasant memory regarding the original film premiere, where she discovered that her line in the movie had been cut. E. J. gains possession of Miss Jenn's personal casting notes and is dismayed to learn that she regarded him as unable to connect with the emotional material of the play. Nini and Ricky privately rehearse a scene together and rediscover their romantic connection while reminiscing about their friendship. Miss Jenn discovers Kourtney's singing ability during the rehearsal, before Kourtney makes a call to the performing arts school Nini was interested in. After falling unconscious in a dazed state, Miss Jenn dreams of performing the song "Role of a Lifetime" with Lucas Grabeel, which later inspires her to redirect the production back to East High.
9	9	"Opening Night"	Kabir Akhtar	Oliver Goldstick	January 3, 2020
On the opening night of the production, E. J. finds himself stepping into the role of Troy for act two. Eight hours earlier, the theater students prepare for their first performance. Miss Jenn secures the East High gymnasium as the performance venue, and asks Mr. Mazzara to help Big Red with the technical equipment. Ricky writes a song for Nini, "Just for a Moment", while Nini prepares a gift for Ricky; but the pair are hesitant to share these with each other. Miss Jenn asks Kourtney to play Taylor in the place of Gina, who has already moved away. Kourtney is relieved when Gina unexpectedly arrives mid-show to resume her role for the dance break of "Stick to the Status Quo". Nini is excited to learn that Kourtney invited the dean of the performing arts school to view the performance, but finds herself daunted by the pressure. Ricky is pleased to have his parents attend the show, but is unnerved when Lynne's new partner arrives during his solo of "Get'cha Head in the Game". Feeling disheartened, Ricky implores E. J. to finish the performance in his place.
10	10	"Act Two"	Kabir Akhtar	Tim Federle	January 10, 2020
E.J. begins playing the role of Troy for act two, while Ricky confronts his mother about bringing her new partner, Todd, to the show. Gina encourages Ricky to at least watch the rest of the production, but once inside, he witnesses E. J. step aside from his role during "Breaking Free" to allow Nini and Ricky to finish the performance together. Gina thanks E. J. for purchasing the plane ticket which allowed her to return. Mr. Mazzara is shocked to witness Big Red's technical skills and invites him to join the robotics club. Nini is upset when the dean of the performing arts school leaves mid-performance. After the show, Ricky comforts Nini before he declares his love for her and the pair kiss. Ricky admits that he was initially afraid to express his feelings. Principal Gutierrez confronts Miss Jenn and Mr. Mazzara, aware that they caused the school fire. Nini is surprised to see the dean return after the show. She congratulates Nini on the performance and offers her a place at the performing arts school, beginning in a month's time. In a mid-credits scene, after the drama, Big Red tap-dances, with Ashlyn observing in the background. The two kiss.

== Cast and characters ==
=== Main ===
- Olivia Rodrigo as Nini Salazar-Roberts
- Joshua Bassett as Ricky Bowen
- Matt Cornett as E. J. Caswell
- Sofia Wylie as Gina Porter
- Larry Saperstein as Big Red
- Julia Lester as Ashlyn Caswell
- Dara Reneé as Kourtney Greene
- Frankie Rodriguez as Carlos Rodriguez
- Mark St. Cyr as Benjamin Mazzara
- Kate Reinders as Miss Jenn

=== Recurring ===
- Joe Serafini as Seb Matthew-Smith
- Alexis Nelis as Natalie Bagley
- Michelle Noh as Dana
- Jeanne Sakata as Malou
- Alex Quijano as Mike Bowen

=== Guest ===
- Nicole Sullivan as Carol
- Valente Rodriguez as Principal Gutierrez
- Kaycee Stroh as Kaycee
- Beth Lacke as Lynne Bowen
- Lucas Grabeel as himself

== Production ==
=== Development ===
Federle pitched the documentary-style series in January 2018, joining the production in May, and would go on to draft the pilot together with Disney Channel, who contributed to the production of the series. On September 6, Disney officially gave the production a series order for a first season consisting of ten episodes. Oliver Goldstick was expected to serve as showrunner and an additional executive producer while Julie Ashton would oversee the casting process. Alongside this announcement, it was also revealed that the show would be of the mockumentary genre and a list of character names and descriptions was released. By May 2019, Goldstick had departed the series over "creative differences", having served as showrunner for the first four episodes.

When talking about the inspiration for the series, Federle noted, "I was always thinking about the original fans, whose childhood I promise I'm not trying to ruin...it's a fresh start and brand-new cast, and I want to tell stories that went totally outside the High School Musical universe and engage people in a new way." Federle noted his love for mockumentary series like The Office and Waiting for Guffman and spoke of the inspiration for his series, "It was right at the height of American Vandal, which I thought was incredible and brilliantly done. And I wanted to differentiate us from the original [movies] right away. I knew that camera-style-wise, if I could borrow some of the elements from The Office, with characters talking to the camera and whip pans and zooms, it would immediately announce it as not a copycat of the original, but a new way in. And the docu-style would allow me to revisit the original music but not feel like we're doing direct karaoke covers."

=== Casting ===
On October 17, 2018, it was announced that Joshua Bassett had been cast in a leading role. The rest of the cast was announced on February 15, 2019, including Sofia Wylie, Kate Reinders, and Olivia Rodrigo. Federle confirmed in November 2019 that an unnamed cast member from the original film would make a cameo appearance through a fantasy sequence. After being listed as a featured artist on the soundtrack, Lucas Grabeel, who played Ryan Evans, was confirmed to be making an appearance on the series.

=== Music ===
The soundtrack for the first season consists of original songs written for the series and new versions of songs from the film High School Musical. Olivia Rodrigo wrote a song for the season, "All I Want," and co-wrote a song with fellow cast member Joshua Bassett and producer Dan Book. The soundtrack was released to all music streaming services and physical media on January 10, 2020.

== Reception ==
=== Critical response ===
The review aggregator website Rotten Tomatoes reported a 75% approval rating for the first season with an average rating of 7.38/10 based on 32 ratings. The website's critical consensus reads, "Though fans may find what they've been looking for in its nostalgic stylings, High School Musical: The Musical: The Series follows a little too closely in its predecessors steps to truly be the start of something new." Metacritic, which uses a weighted average, assigned a score of 64 out of 100 based on 16 critics, indicating "generally favorable" reviews.

=== Accolades ===
Awards and nominations received by High School Musical: The Musical: The Series
Award	Year	Category	Nominee(s)	Result	Ref.
Artios Awards	2021	Outstanding Achievement in Casting: Children's Pilot and Series (Live Action)	Julie Ashton	Nominated	
Directors Guild of America Award	2021	Outstanding Directorial Achievement in Children's Programs	Kabir Akhtar (for "Opening Night")	Nominated	
GLAAD Media Award	2020	Outstanding Kids & Family Programming	High School Musical: The Musical: The Series	Won (Note: Also awarded to The Bravest Knight.)	
Nickelodeon Kids' Choice Awards (United States)	2020	Favorite Male TV Star	Joshua Bassett	Nominated	
Nickelodeon Kids' Choice Awards (United States)	2021	Favorite Female TV Star	Sofia Wylie	Nominated	
Nickelodeon Kids' Choice Awards (United States)	2021	Favorite Kids TV Show	High School Musical: The Musical: The Series	Nominated	
Nickelodeon Kids' Choice Awards (United States)	2021	Favorite Male TV Star	Joshua Bassett	Nominated	
