= High School Musical: The Musical: The Series season 2 =

Season of television series

High School Musical: The Musical: The Series
- Season 2
- Promotional poster
- Starring: Olivia Rodrigo; Joshua Bassett; Matt Cornett; Sofia Wylie; Larry Saperstein; Julia Lester; Dara Reneé; Frankie Rodriguez; Joe Serafini; Mark St. Cyr; Kate Reinders
- No. of episodes: 12

Release
- Original network: Disney+
- Original release: May 14 – July 30, 2021

Season chronology
- ← Previous; Season 1 Next → Season 3

The second season of High School Musical: The Musical: The Series, an American mockumentary musical drama streaming television series created by Tim Federle, premiered on Disney+ on May 14, 2021; the season consisted of 12 episodes, which released weekly until July 30, 2021. The series itself is inspired by the High School Musical film series.

The students of the East High drama club return after the success of High School Musical and put on a production of Beauty and the Beast, and find themselves in the middle of a rivalry between Miss Jenn and her high school rival Zack, who is the drama club director of North High, that sees them entered into a prestigious high school theater competition.

Filming for the second season began in February 2020 but was shut down a month later due to the COVID-19 pandemic, with production resuming later that year and ending in early 2021. Joe Serafini, who recurred in the first season, was promoted to series regular, while this would be the final season with Olivia Rodrigo as a series regular. Disney+ renewed the series for a third season in September 2021.

== Episodes ==
No. overall	No. in season	Title	Directed by	Written by	Original release date
11	1	"New Year's Eve"	Kimberly McCullough	Tim Federle	May 14, 2021
The East High theater students celebrate the beginning of the holiday break with a performance of "Something in the Air". Miss Jenn oversees the reconstruction of the school theater's stage (Note: Destroyed in the season 1 episode "Thanksgiving".) while planning for their next production, High School Musical 2. She encounters her high school boyfriend and former stage rival Zack Roy, who has returned to rival school North High to lead the school's drama department in their production of The Little Mermaid, in the hope of winning the Alan Menken Award for high school theater productions. Intimidated, Miss Jenn decides to shift East High's spring musical to Beauty and the Beast to compete against her rival. During a New Year's Eve party at Ashlyn's house, she announces the change and reveals that she has entered the group into the competition. Ricky struggles with the news that his father will be downsizing to a smaller home. After hiding the news about her acceptance into the performing arts school from Ricky, (Note: As depicted in the season 1 episode "Act Two".) Nini suddenly reveals to him that she will be moving to Denver.
12	2	"Typecasting"	Kimberly McCullough	Ann Kim	May 21, 2021
The drama students make preparations to audition for the new musical, using the song "Belle." Ricky feels hesitant to participate in the production as a result of Nini's sudden departure, but Miss Jenn recognizes his commitment and awards him the lead role of the Beast. Ashlyn resigns herself to the belief she will be typecast based on her previous role (Note: The role of Ms. Darbus in High School Musical, confirmed in the season 1 episode "The Auditions".) but is surprised to discover she has won the role of Belle. Two weeks after her departure, Nini begins to feel isolated at the performing arts school in Denver. She tries to enliven a classical acting scene with contemporary language, but her teachers are unimpressed and implore her to follow the school's strict guidelines. At East High, new student Lily attempts to befriend the cast, but the drama students are offended by her ill-mannered and pretentious attitude during the audition process. Miss Jenn declines to offer Lily a role in the show, leading her to contact the North High drama department.
13	3	"Valentine's Day"	Paul Hoen	Zach Dodes	May 28, 2021
Nini briefly travels home to Salt Lake to surprise Ricky for Valentine's Day, unaware that he has proceeded to Denver to surprise her as well. He later returns, and the pair stay in contact through phone calls; however, they fail to find a time to see each other in person during Nini's visit. Gina begins to miss her traditional Valentine's Day gift from her absent mother, and she finds comfort in talking to Ricky. Kourtney begins working as the assistant manager of Big Red's family pizzeria and struggles to earn the respect of long-time employee Howie. Rehearsals for Beauty and the Beast begin, and Ashlyn worries that she does not match the established appearance of Belle. Big Red reassures her and plans her a spectacular surprise for the holiday. Carlos and Seb also celebrate their first Valentine's Day together. Lily reveals to Miss Jenn that she will be transferring to North High to participate in their musical.
14	4	"The Storm"	Paul Hoen	Ritza Bloom	June 4, 2021
The students are forced to seek shelter at East High during a heavy storm, which causes a power outage at the school. Rehearsals continue and Carlos and Gina bicker over who can best choreograph "Be Our Guest". They eventually realize their similarities and agree to reach a compromise. Nini returns to East High to say goodbye to the drama club and finds out that E. J. was rejected from Duke University. Mr. Mazzara comforts E. J. by telling the story about his rejection from Caltech. Miss Jenn offers to drive Nini to the bus stop, but the pair get stuck in snow from the storm. Nini confesses to Miss Jenn that her time at the performing arts school has been less than ideal; she has been feeling stifled and unfulfilled. Miss Jenn reassures Nini that dreams can change, like when she gave up her dream of performing on Broadway for teaching. Nini bids farewell to Ricky at the bus stop and struggles to leave again. Miss Jenn is pleasantly surprised to find that Nini has not boarded the bus, and that she will be permanently returning to East High.
15	5	"The Quinceañero"	Kimberly McCullough	Emilia Serrano	June 11, 2021
To celebrate Carlos's 16th birthday, the drama students throw him the surprise quinceañero that he never had. Ricky's father Mike agrees to chaperone the party alongside Miss Jenn, and his affection for her intensifies. (Note: Beginning in the season 1 episode "Homecoming".) This leads to an awkward exchange with Mr. Mazzara, who is also in attendance, and growing increasingly fond of Miss Jenn. Mr. Mazzara mentors E. J. as the pair manage the audiovisual setup of the night. Seb sings "The Climb" for Carlos, and Gina performs a dance to show him how inspiring he is. She later calls her mother to say that she is ready to return home. (Note: Explained in the season 1 episode "Thanksgiving".) Nini has returned to East High and watches from the sideline as the rest of the cast rehearse for the show. Ricky attempts to convince Miss Jenn to give her a role in the musical, although Nini hopes to continue her dreams of songwriting in order to further her career. However, when North High suddenly changes their production to Beauty and the Beast to fuel the rivalry, Miss Jenn desperately generates an innovative idea to allow Nini to return to the stage.
16	6	"Yes, And"	Kimberly McCullough	Ilana Wolpert	June 18, 2021
After North High posts an online video to advertise their show, Miss Jenn is inspired to lead her cast in a weekend of improvisational activities to foster team bonding and character study. Additionally, Miss Jenn creates a new role for Nini to allow her to participate in Beauty and the Beast, a personified version of the enchanted rose; Nini writes "The Rose Song" exclusively for East High's performance. Carlos films Nini singing the song to post online without her knowledge. Nini helps Kourtney find the confidence to admit her feelings for her colleague Howie, which he reciprocates. Ricky begins to feel as if his relationship with Nini is disintegrating and that things around him are changing too much. He expresses discomfort about his father's first date with Miss Jenn, which causes her to end the relationship. Contrary to her desires, Gina is forced to stay at East High, leading her to feel distant around her friends. It is revealed that at the end of last semester's musical, Gina admitted to Ricky that she had unrequited feelings for him. (Note: As depicted in the season 1 episode "Act Two".) Now confused, Gina begins to question her emotions.
17	7	"The Field Trip"	Paul Hoen	Carrie Rosen	June 25, 2021
After E. J. and Gina begin hosting East High's morning news program together, the pair's bond strengthens. Kourtney reveals the completed Beauty and the Beast costumes to the cast, although the students suspect someone from North High has stolen the Beast's mask. As a result, they infiltrate their opposition school's drama department to recover the key costume piece. They are caught by Lily and challenged to a dance-off to "The Mob Song". The performance culminates with Kourtney discovering that Howie is a student at North High and will be playing the Beast in their production, leading her to feel betrayed. Meanwhile, Miss Jenn visits Zack in an attempt to make a truce between the schools, before she discovers that he was the one who stole the mask. Nini's performance of "The Rose Song" becomes popular online and Ricky feels left out of Nini's successful moment. Lily influences Ricky to feel disheartened about Nini's song; he confronts her with concern about the lyrics suggesting she is feeling confined in her relationship with him. Feeling unsupported, Nini begins a new social media account to share her music, adopting her true name, Nina.
18	8	"Most Likely To"	Paul Hoen	Nneka Gerstle	July 2, 2021
E. J. and Big Red rehearse the "Gaston" musical number, before the theater students are informed that rehearsals must be suspended for a week, as punishment for trespassing at North High. E. J.'s father speaks at Career Day and reveals that he has helped E. J. secure a place at Duke. E. J. does not accept the position, as he feels that he did not truly earn it. He and Gina bond while talking about his decision and their desires for the future. Big Red's aptitude test places him as suitable for the hospitality industry; he is upset that Ashlyn does not initially support this aspiration, but they later make amends. Kourtney is upset that Howie kept his role in North High's musical a secret from her. Howie responds by singing "If I Can't Love Her". Mr. Mazzara and Miss Jenn bond while he helps her film an audition for a television commercial. While Nini's online music account continues to gain popularity, Ricky becomes increasingly upset that the pair are not speaking. They fight about Ricky not understanding Nini's ambitions. The pair break up when they realise that they are holding each other back.
19	9	"Spring Break"	Brent Geisler	Natalia Castells-Esquivel	July 9, 2021
Over Spring break, Miss Jenn keeps in contact with the theater students through video call. She encourages them to remain focused on the musical, before North High posts an online video slandering East High. Nini and Ashlyn write a new song, "You Ain't Seen Nothin'", for the students to perform and film, which is uploaded in response. Ricky spends some time with his mother in Chicago after his break-up with Nini. His mother helps him process his feelings and come to terms with the situation. His mother reminds him that both him and Nini have changed and suggests he let Nini go in order to move on. This prompts Ricky to write a song, "Let You Go", discussing these feelings. While waiting for her flight to Louisiana, Gina's flight is delayed and she becomes stuck at the airport. While she waits, she befriends Jack (Asher Angel), whose father is a pilot. The pair spend some time together and intimately get to know each other. Jack encourages Gina to stop guarding her emotions and open herself up to a relationship. Before leaving the airport, Gina is greeted by E. J., as she contemplates her emotions.
20	10	"The Transformation"	Joanna Kerns	Jessica Leventhal	July 16, 2021
Two weeks before opening night, rehearsals for the Beast's transformation scene prove to be chaotic and underprepared. Miss Jenn discovers that North High has acquired the technical set design specifications from the original Broadway production, which inspires her to reconsider her plans for the scene. The theater students band together to conceive a new plan for the transformation. Meanwhile, Seb feels insecure in his relationship after Carlos returns from his vacation. Ricky helps Carlos write and perform a song for Seb, "In a Heartbeat", in order to address his feelings and consolidate their relationship. Gina and E. J. arrange to go on a date. After Kourtney obtains the technical plans from Howie, the cast set up a theatrical rigging system in order to suspend Ricky in the air on stage when the Beast transforms into a human. The students enter the auditorium and organize the wires unsupervised, elevating Ricky into the air. During the run-through of the transformation scene, the rope stretches and breaks, causing Ricky to fall to the ground.
21	11	"Showtime"	Joanna Kerns	Zach Dodes	July 23, 2021
On the opening night of the production, Ricky and Ashlyn prepare to perform with injured wrists as a result of the fall during rehearsals, while Nini hands out congratulatory notes for the cast. A representative of the local theater competition attends to judge the performance, which causes Miss Jenn to stress about the show. During the performance of "Be Our Guest", Miss Jenn instructs the crew to spotlight the judge; the cast later performs "Something There". Carlos and Big Red suffer from stage fright. Kourtney is greeted by Howie backstage, who is strangely anxious. E. J. and Gina plan to go on their first date. Gina's older brother Jamie attends the performance and congratulates her backstage; he inadvertently tells E. J. that he is filling an "older brother" role for Gina, which leaves him confused and disappointed. Lily approaches Ricky backstage and the pair bond, leading him to consider a friendship with her. Nearing the transformation scene, Ricky's harness for the rigging system goes missing. The students return to the stage using an alternate plan, as Lily sits in the audience with the stolen harness.
22	12	"Second Chances"	Kimberly McCullough & Joanna Kerns	Zach Dodes & Tim Federle	July 30, 2021
The performance concludes and Big Red surprises Ashlyn with a present, a sign with her name in lights. Impressed by her performance, Howie approaches Kourtney and the pair decide to resume their relationship. Nini and Ricky reconcile their friendship by reading each other their congratulatory cards. Miss Jenn holds onto hope for success in the theater competition, before the students decide that they would not like to learn of the outcome of their performance. Ultimately, they decide to abandon their place in the competition. Gina arranges for Nini to get in contact with Jamie to help set her music career in motion. Mr. Mazzara is offered a place in the robotics program at Caltech upon the recommendation of E. J.'s father. Ricky gives Miss Jenn his blessing to pursue a relationship with his father, before Mr. Mazzara also confesses his feelings for her. Ricky decides to give Lily a second chance and reaches out to her. Disheartened by Jamie's comments, E. J. cancels his date with Gina. Ashlyn corrects the misunderstanding and Gina and E. J. set out to have their first kiss.

== Cast and characters ==
=== Main ===
- Olivia Rodrigo as Nini Salazar-Roberts
- Joshua Bassett as Ricky Bowen
- Matt Cornett as E. J. Caswell
- Sofia Wylie as Gina Porter
- Larry Saperstein as Big Red
- Julia Lester as Ashlyn Caswell
- Dara Reneé as Kourtney Greene
- Frankie A. Rodriguez as Carlos Rodriguez
- Joe Serafini as Seb Matthew-Smith
- Mark St. Cyr as Benjamin Mazzara
- Kate Reinders as Miss Jenn

=== Recurring ===
- Alexis Nelis as Natalie Bagley
- Alex Quijano as Mike Bowen
- Derek Hough as Zack
- Olivia Rose Keegan as Lily
- Roman Banks as Howie
- Andrew Barth Feldman as Antoine
- Kimberly Brooks as Michelle Greene

=== Guest ===
- Beth Lacke as Lynne Bowen
- Asher Angel as Jack
- Jordan Fisher as Jamie Porter

== Production ==
=== Development ===
In October 2019, High School Musical: The Musical: The Series was renewed for a second season shortly before the first season debuted on Disney+ the following month. Despite fan speculation that the musical would be an adaptation of the 2006 film High School Musical 2, it was revealed in February 2020 by showrunner Tim Federle that the musical would not be High School Musical 2, instead it would be the stage adaptation of the 1991 film Beauty and the Beast. On choosing Beauty and the Beast as the musical for the season, Federle explained, "It was one of the first Broadway shows I ever saw, when I was 14, and it's got all the perfect metaphors for the high school experience: Do people judge me for how I look? What is true love? Will I achieve the future I dream of? And, perhaps most importantly, it's got dancing forks."

=== Casting ===
The main cast from the first season all returned, with recurring star Joe Serafini being promoted to the main cast in December 2019. On his promotion, Serafini told the Los Angeles Times, "I was screaming. I'm in nine of the 10 episodes in Season 1, so I was hoping that would be the case, but just to hear actually Tim [Federle] call me on the phone and tell me that that was the plan, I was just overjoyed, and I could not be more excited to go back to Salt Lake City to film and be back with the cast." In March 2020, Derek Hough joined the cast as Zack Roy. Later that month, Roman Banks and Olivia Rose Keegan joined the cast as Howie and Lily respectively. A year later, in March 2021, Andrew Barth Feldman and Asher Angel joined the cast as Antoine and Jack respectively. Federle noted about Feldman and Angel, "The cast and I are excited for fans to see how Andrew and Asher expand our East High cinematic universe." Three days before the eleventh episode premiered, Jordan Fisher was confirmed to be appearing in a guest capacity in that episode as Gina's brother Jamie.

For the in-show production of Beauty and the Beast, Ashlyn is cast as Belle, Ricky as the Beast, E.J. as Gaston, Big Red as LeFou, Gina as Babette the Featherduster, Kourtney as Mrs. Potts, Seb as Chip, and Carlos as Lumiere. Nini was originally cast as the Beast's rose, then later in the ensemble. Additionally, in North High's production of Beauty and the Beast, Lily is cast as Belle, Howie as the Beast and Antoine as Lumiere. On casting the characters in the show, Federle stated, "When we have a new season of the show, part of the fun is the casting of the show within the show. I feel like the drama teacher. And some of it is just very basic. Like, I want Dara Reneé to sing 'Beauty and the Beast,' so she's Mrs. Potts. And E.J. sort of is a carbon copy of Gaston. As his arc plays out this season — as he becomes humbled in some places — there's an interesting juxtaposition of him playing this character who's such a buffoon." On casting Julia Lester as Belle, he went on to say, "Julia is such a good comedic actor, and such a relatable person, that giving her the opportunity to play Belle was very meaningful to me. Not only does she have a killer voice, but Ashlyn this season is dealing with what it means to be romantically loved for the first time. That makes Ashlyn uncomfortable, because she's so used to being in the shadows, so to put her in the spotlight in every way felt like a great way to throw that character into some dramatic situations."

=== Filming ===
Filming for the second season began in early February 2020, along with the official announcement of the musical and an announcement trailer featuring the cast performing "Beauty and the Beast." However, in March of that year, production was shut down over growing concerns surrounding the COVID-19 pandemic. In the lockdowns, the cast and crew would create a holiday special throughout the fall, which was released on Disney+ in December of that year. When production resumed, strict COVID-19 restrictions would be put in place for the cast and crew. Production resumed later in 2020 and was completed by March 2021.

=== Music ===
Pre-orders for the soundtrack began on July 21, 2021. Once again, Joshua Bassett and Olivia Rodrigo write songs for the second season: Bassett wrote "The Perfect Gift" and Rodrigo wrote "The Rose Song." The soundtrack was digitally released on July 30, 2021 on all music streaming services.

== Reception ==
=== Critical response ===
The review aggregator website Rotten Tomatoes reported an 75% approval rating based on 8 reviews.

In a four-star review for The Dartmouth, Pierce Wilson noted the lack of character depth and chemistry, and criticized the music for not being as charming as in the first season, but praised the relationship issues, adding, "The fact that none of these relationships were perfect and all had complex issues made the show so much more realistic and immersive...If 'HSMTMTS' is renewed for a third season, I hope it continues to focus on the depth of its characters and refine its sonic identity." Logan Corkins from the Boss Rush Network praised the acting, especially that of Rodrigo, Bassett, Wylie, Lester, Hough and Keegan. He also praised pitting East High against North High for its realism, though "...opening night was one the most anti-climatic parts of the rivalry." He went on to positively review the music, praising Serafini's version of "The Climb" by stating " I particularly love the bridge when the music drops back and you hear Joe let his voice control the song."

=== Accolades ===
Awards and nominations received by High School Musical: The Musical: The Series
Award	Year	Category	Nominee(s)	Result	Ref.
Children's and Family Emmy Awards	2022	Outstanding Young Teen Program	High School Musical: The Musical: The Series	Nominated	
Children's and Family Emmy Awards	2022	Outstanding Lighting Design for a Live Action Program	High School Musical: The Musical: The Series	Nominated	
Children's and Family Emmy Awards	2022	Outstanding Costume Design/Styling	High School Musical: The Musical: The Series	Nominated	
Children's and Family Emmy Awards	2022	Outstanding Makeup and Hairstyling	High School Musical: The Musical: The Series	Nominated	
Children's and Family Emmy Awards	2022	Outstanding Choreography	High School Musical: The Musical: The Series	Nominated	
GLAAD Media Award	2022	Outstanding Kids & Family Programming	High School Musical: The Musical: The Series	Nominated	
Imagen Awards	2022	Best Actor – Comedy (Television)	Frankie Rodriguez	Nominated	
MTV Movie & TV Awards	2022	Best Musical Moment	"The Rose Song" – Olivia Rodrigo	Nominated	
Nickelodeon Kids' Choice Awards (United States)	2022	Favorite Female TV Star (Kids)	Olivia Rodrigo	Won	
Nickelodeon Kids' Choice Awards (United States)	2022	Favorite Female TV Star (Kids)	Sofia Wylie	Nominated	
Nickelodeon Kids' Choice Awards (United States)	2022	Favorite Kids TV Show	High School Musical: The Musical: The Series	Won	
Nickelodeon Kids' Choice Awards (United States)	2022	Favorite Male TV Star (Kids)	Joshua Bassett	Won	
