= What My Mother Doesn't Know =

2001 novel by Sonya Sones

What My Mother Doesn’t Know
- First edition
- Author: Sonya Sones
- Language: English
- Genre: Young adult
- Publisher: Simon & Schuster
- Publication date: 2001
- Publication place: United States
- Media type: Print Hardback
- Pages: 272 pp
- ISBN: 978-0-689-85553-5
- OCLC: 51733502
- Followed by: What My Girlfriend Doesn't Know

What My Mother Doesn't Know (2001) is a novel in verse by Sonya Sones. The free-verse novel follows ninth-grader Sophie Stein as she struggles through the daily grind of being a freshman in high school, her romantic crushes, and her family life. It has been translated into French, German, Indonesian and Swedish, and published as an audiobook read by Kate Reinders.

The companion book What My Girlfriend Doesn't Know, written from the perspective of Sophie's boyfriend Robin (Murphy), was published in 2007.

== Plot summary ==
At the start of the novel, Sophie finds herself dumped by her current boyfriend Lou, then immediately falls into a new relationship with Dylan, a boy considered the height of masculine beauty by her friends. As they date, Sophie discovers she does not really love or even like Dylan all that much and ends their relationship in favor of not actually liking his personality. She then forms a secret romance with an internet chat-room boy named Chaz.

Before she meets Chaz in person, Sophie discovers he is a pervert and ends the relationship quickly. Now on her own, in real life, she encounters an outcast classmate, Robin Murphy, at the local art museum and is astonished to realize that while he is not physically attractive or liked by her friends, she falls in love with him. The book ends with Sophie choosing to sit with Robin in the cafeteria instead of her friends, knowing that revealing her secret relationship to her friends and classmates would be okay.

== Reception ==
The book received a starred review from Publishers Weekly, which said, "Drawing on the recognizable cadences of teenage speech, Sones poignantly captures the tingle and heartache of being young and boy-crazy".

It also received a starred review from Kirkus Reviews: "Sones has crafted a verse experience that will leave teenage readers sighing with recognition and satisfaction".

== Controversy ==
The novel appears on the ALA’s list of most frequently challenged books in 2004, 2005, and 2011.

== Awards ==
- Winner of the Iowa Teen Book Award (2005–2006)
- Michigan Thumbs Up Award Honor Book (2002)
- Chosen an American Library Association Best Books for Young Adults (2002) .
- Chosen an American Library Association Top Ten Quick Pick for Reluctant Young Adult Readers (2002)
- Named an International Reading Association Young Adults' Choice (2003)
- Named a Booklist Editor's Choice (2001)
- Voted a VOYA Top Shelf for Middle School Readers (2003)
- Pennsylvania Young Reader's Choice Award: YA Recommended Title (2003–2004)
- Named a New York Public Library Book for the Teen Age (2002, 2003, and 2004)
- Named a Texas Lone Star State Reading List Choice (2003–2004)
- Named a Top Ten Editor's Choice by Teenreads.com (2001)
- Named a Bookreporter.com Best of 2001 for Teens

== See also ==
- List of most commonly challenged books in the U.S.
