= The Rose Song =

2021 song by Olivia Rodrigo

Promotional single by Olivia Rodrigo

from the album High School Musical: The Musical: The Series: The Soundtrack: Season 2
- Written: 2020
- Released: June 18, 2021
- Length: 2:58
- Label: Walt Disney Records
- Songwriter: Olivia Rodrigo
- Producer: Matthew Tishler

Music video
- "The Rose Song" on YouTube

"The Rose Song" is a song written and performed by American singer-songwriter and actress Olivia Rodrigo, released as part of the soundtrack album High School Musical: The Musical: The Series: The Soundtrack: Season 2. The song appears in the second season episode "Yes, And" from High School Musical: The Musical: The Series, in which Nini (Rodrigo)—who is cast as the Rose in a high school production of Beauty and the Beast—writes a solo for her character after a writer's block. An emotional piano ballad, "The Rose Song" incorporates themes of independence and individuality. The song was released on June 18, 2021, and received positive reviews from critics. It was also nominated for an MTV Movie & TV Award for Best Musical Moment.

== Background and release ==
Beginning in 2019, American singer-songwriter and actress Olivia Rodrigo starred in Disney+ series High School Musical: The Musical: The Series. During this time, she wrote and performed "All I Want", which charted on the Billboard Hot 100 and was certified gold by the Recording Industry Association of America. In October 2019, the series was renewed for a second season, for which producer Tim Federle revealed she had written a "pretty extraordinary" song. He stated: "This was an opportunity to showcase what is the most extraordinary thing about [the show's cast], which is, like, all Olivia needs is a piano."

Rodrigo wrote the first version chords of "The Rose Song" in 20 minutes after being asked to by Federle. She stated she was given the prompt of a "feminist song from the perspective of a rose". The song was written in 2020, approximately six or seven months before the release of her debut single "Drivers License" in January 2021. Rodrigo thought the experience of writing for her character—instead of her music career—was unique and enjoyable. She commented that it was an amazing challenge for her as a songwriter to work inside a prompt and have limitations on her creativity; this contrasted from her own music, where she could write about anything she wanted. For the songs she writes for the series, Rodrigo regularly tries to incorporate both her personal experience and her distinctive songwriting voices. "The Rose Song" was released on June 18, 2021, as part of the soundtrack album High School Musical: The Musical: The Series: The Soundtrack: Season 2.

== Composition and lyrics ==
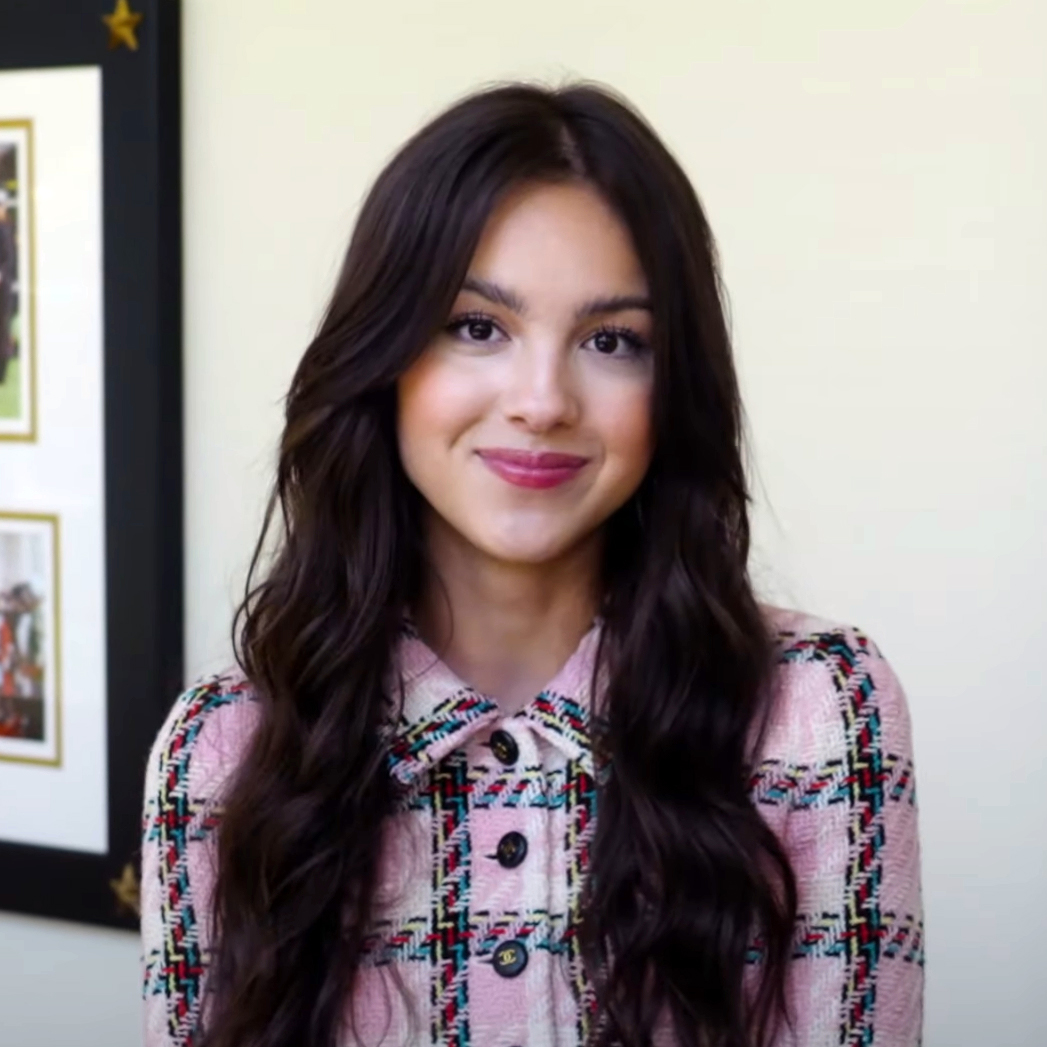
"The Rose Song" was written solely by Olivia Rodrigo.

"The Rose Song" is an emotional piano ballad. USA Today described it as "sweet [and] uplifting". The song is written solely by Rodrigo. Composed in the key of F major, it has a moderate tempo of 142 beats per minute. During "The Rose Song", Rodrigo's vocal range spans from the low note of G_{3} to the high note of G_{5}. The song starts gentle and controlled before a swelling second verse.

In High School Musical: The Musical: The Series, "The Rose Song" appears in the second season's "Yes, And" episode, which follows Nini (Rodrigo) as she goes through a writer's block. She is cast as the Rose in her school's production of Beauty and the Beast, and struggles to write a duet between the Rose and the Beast; Nini later ends up writing a solo for her character. During the song, Nini sings about learning she is not what others perceive her to be, growing more independent, and discovering her individuality, singing during the chorus: "'Cause I am more than what I am to you / You say I'm perfect / But I've got thorns with my petals, too / And I won't be confined to your point of view / I'm breakin' through the glass you put me in / 'Cause my beauty's from within." Of writing the song's message, Rodrigo stated:

I think all of us can feel restricted whether it's by outside forces or by other people's opinions. And I also think it's super cool, because it also ties it to the rose thing, because the roses [sic] kept under a glass, and you're breaking through the glass so it could be a glass ceiling thing, too.

== Reception ==
"The Rose Song" has received positive reviews from critics. Entertainment Weekly ranked it Rodrigo's second-best song on HSMTMTS, with praise for her emotion and vocals. Comic Book Resources considered it one of the show's best musical moments as well as Rodrigo's swan song on the series. At the 2022 MTV Movie & TV Awards, "The Rose Song" was nominated for Best Musical Moment.

== Charts ==
Chart performance for "The Rose Song"
Chart (2021)	Peak position
New Zealand Hot Singles (RMNZ)	11
