= What My Girlfriend Doesn't Know =

2007 novel by Sonya Sones

What My Girlfriend Doesn’t Know
- First edition
- Author: Sonya Sones
- Language: English
- Genre: Young adult
- Publisher: Simon & Schuster
- Publication date: 2007
- Publication place: United States
- Media type: Print Hardback
- Pages: 320 pp
- ISBN: 0-689-87603-3
- Preceded by: What My Mother Doesn't Know

What My Girlfriend Doesn't Know (2007) is a novel in verse by Sonya Sones. The free verse novel follows ninth-grader Robin as he struggles with being an outsider at his high school and dealing with the joys of having a girlfriend, Sophie, and seeing his artistic talent recognized by his teacher and parents. It is a companion novel to Sones' What My Mother Doesn't Know(2001).

== Plot summary ==
What My Girlfriend Doesn't Know picks up where the previous novel ended, with Robin unable to believe he has a girlfriend. Due to the dynamics of high school social interaction, Sophie is ostracized by her friends because she chose the school loser as her boyfriend. This is familiar territory for Robin, but new to Sophie. To make matters worse Robin is accepted into a special figure drawing class at Harvard University where he is readily accepted by the other art students. He is amazed to realize they do not care that he is “only” a high school student or that he is an outcast in school. Sophie is able to eventually reconcile with her friends once they realize she can only be happy dating Robin. One of the girls in Robin's drawing class, Tessa, falls for him as well, and he is conflicted about being attracted to two girls at once, especially since Tessa is a “college woman” (though when the art class indulges in vodka Jell-O shots she reveals she's a minor genius, only sixteen years old and accepted into Harvard after skipping several grades in school). Sophie discovers Robin and Tessa made out at the party, temporarily dumps him, but relents when he admits his stupidity and that he does not know how to properly operate in social interactions with anyone, especially girls.

== Critical reception ==
Publishers Weekly noted the "raw honesty and authentic voice" of the novel. Kirkus Reviews was less enthusiastic, saying, " If this offering lacks some of the intensity of its predecessor, it nevertheless provides both an opportunity to revisit two likable characters and the advantage of a fresh viewpoint".

== Awards ==
- 2007 Quick Pick for Reluctant Young Adult Readers by the American Library Association

== In other languages ==
It has been translated into French and Swedish.
