= Stop Pretending: What Happened When My Big Sister Went Crazy =

1999 is a novel in verse by Sonya Sones

- First edition
- Author: Sonya Sones
- Language: English
- Genre: Young adult fiction
- Publisher: HarperCollins
- Publication date: 1999
- Publication place: United States
- Media type: Print Hardcover
- Pages: 160pp
- ISBN: 978-0-06-028387-2

Stop Pretending: What Happened When My Big Sister Went Crazy (1999) is a novel in verse by Sonya Sones. The free-verse novel follows Cookie, a thirteen-year-old girl, whose older sister is hospitalized on Christmas Eve when she has an intense breakdown that is eventually diagnosed as manic depression. The novel is loosely based on Sones’ own journals from her childhood, when her own sister went through the same treatment.

== Critical reception ==
Stop Pretending was a finalist for the 1999 Los Angeles Times Book Prize for Young Adult. It was positively reviewed by Kirkus Reviews.
