= Into the Woods (2022 Broadway Cast Recording) =

2022 Broadway cast album

Cast recording by the 2022 Broadway cast of Into the Woods
- Released: September 30, 2022
- Recorded: September 2–6, 2022
- Venue: Avatar, NYC
- Genre: Show tunes; R&B; soul
- Length: 1:14:25
- Label: Craft Recordings; Concord
- Producer: Sean Patrick Flahaven; Rob Berman; Jordan Roth (exec.)

Into the Woods is the cast album to the 2022 Broadway revival of the 1987 musical Into the Woods with music and lyrics by Stephen Sondheim and book by James Lapine. The recording stars Patina Miller, Brian d'Arcy James, Sara Bareilles, Phillipa Soo, Gavin Creel, Julia Lester, Cole Thompson, David Patrick Kelly, Joshua Henry, Annie Golden, Alysia Velez and much of the Broadway cast members. The album was produced by Sean Patrick Flahaven, who worked in Sondheim's musicals.

The album was announced on September 15, 2022, and pre-orders began the same day. It was accompanied by the first single "Moments in the Woods" performed by Sara Bareilles. It was released digitally by Concord Music Group and Craft Recordings on September 30, 2022. It was released in CD on November 25, 2022, and a two-disc vinyl LP was released on March 17, 2023. At the 65th Annual Grammy Awards, the album won the Best Musical Theater Album award.

== Track listing ==
All tracks are written by Stephen Sondheim. All music produced by Sean Patrick Flahaven.

No.	Title	Performer(s)	Length
1.	"Prologue: Into the Woods"	Into the Woods 2022 Broadway Cast	13:46
2.	"Cinderella at the Grave"	Annie Golden; David Patrick Kelly; Phillipa Soo	01:21
3.	"Hello, Little Girl"	Gavin Creel; Julia Lester	02:41
4.	"I Guess This Is Goodbye"	Cole Thompson	01:02
5.	"Maybe They're Magic"	Sara Bareilles; Brian d'Arcy James	00:59
6.	"I Know Things Now"	Lester	01:55
7.	"A Very Nice Prince"	Bareilles; Soo	01:09
8.	"First Midnight"	Cast	01:11
9.	"Giants in the Sky"	Thompson	02:23
10.	"Agony"	Creel; Joshua Henry	02:26
11.	"It Takes Two"	Bareilles; James	02:49
12.	"Second Midnight"	Cast	00:45
13.	"Stay With Me"	Patina Miller; Alysia Velez	02:54
14.	"On the Steps of the Palace"	Soo	02:26
15.	"Ever After"	Cast	02:25
16.	"Prologue: So Happy"	Cast	05:00
17.	"Agony (Reprise)"	Creel; Henry	02:21
18.	"Witch's Lament"	Miller	02:18
19.	"Any Moment"	Creel; Bareilles	02:07
20.	"Moments in the Woods"	Bareilles	03:03
21.	"Your Fault"	James; Lester; Miller; Soo; Thompson	01:41
22.	"Last Midnight"	Miller	03:15
23.	"No More"	James; Kelly	04:13
24.	"No One Is Alone"	James; Lester; Soo; Thompson	03:43
25.	"Finale: Children Will Listen"	James; Bareilles; Miller; Cast	06:20
Total length:			01:14:25

== Reception ==
Alex Kullak of OnStage Blog wrote "Sondheim had given us a gift even greater than Into The Woods. He had given us a language to process our grief with. Through his lyrics, his music, and his understanding of the human condition, he teaches all of us that even after loss, no matter how great, 'No One Is Alone'." Bobby Patrick of BroadwayWorld wrote "the 2022 Cast Album of the revival production of Into The Woods offers this generation of The Broadway Musical fans palpably wonderful renditions of Mr. Sondheim's score. it is safe to say that those who believe the OG cast is the end all/be all/there-is-no-other actually will find a lot to like here, and those who are new to these woods, you are getting, with this recording, the same care of the material that came out some 35 years ago."

== Release history ==
Release dates and formats for Into the Woods (2022 Broadway Cast Recording)
Region	Date	Format(s)	Label	Ref.
Various	September 30, 2022	Digital download; streaming	Craft Recordings; Concord Music Group	
Various	November 25, 2022	CD	Craft Recordings; Concord Music Group	
Various	March 17, 2023	Vinyl	Craft Recordings; Concord Music Group	

== Personnel ==
Cast

- Patina Miller – The Witch
- Brian d'Arcy James – The Baker
- Sara Bareilles – The Baker's Wife
- Phillipa Soo – Cinderella
- Gavin Creel – Cinderella's Prince/The Wolf
- Julia Lester – Little Red Ridinghood
- Cole Thompson – Jack
- David Patrick Kelly – The Narrator/The Mysterious Man
- Joshua Henry – Rapunzel's Prince
- Alysia Velez – Rapunzel
- Annie Golden – The Giant's Wife

Production

- Derek Bishop – art direction, design
- Serino Coyne, Inc. – cover art
- Rob Berman – co-producer, conductor, leader
- Lear DeBessonet – musical direction
- Jordan Roth – executive production
- Oscar Zambrano – mastering
- Zampol Productions – mastering
- Stephen Sondheim – music, lyrics
- Sean Patrick Flahaven – producer
- Isaiah Abolin – recording
- Lawrence Manchester – recording
- Ian Kagey – recording, editing, mastering

== Charts ==
=== Weekly charts ===
Chart (2022)	Peak position
US Cast Albums (Billboard)	1

=== Year-end charts ===
Chart (2022)	Position
US Cast Albums (Billboard)	3

== Accolades ==
Ceremony	Date	Categories	Results	Ref.
Grammy Awards	February 5, 2023	Best Musical Theater Album	Won	
