= Anyone but You =

2023 romantic comedy film by Will Gluck

- Theatrical release poster
- Directed by: Will Gluck
- Screenplay by: Ilana Wolpert; Will Gluck
- Story by: Ilana Wolpert
- Based on: Much Ado About Nothing by William Shakespeare
- Produced by: Will Gluck; Joe Roth; Jeff Kirschenbaum
- Starring: Sydney Sweeney; Glen Powell; Alexandra Shipp; GaTa; Hadley Robinson; Michelle Hurd; Dermot Mulroney; Darren Barnet; Bryan Brown; Rachel Griffiths
- Cinematography: Danny Ruhlmann
- Edited by: Tia Nolan; Kim Boritz-Brehm
- Music by: Este Haim; Chris Stracey
- Production companies: Columbia Pictures; SK Global; RK Films; Olive Bridge Entertainment
- Distributed by: Sony Pictures Releasing
- Release dates: December 11, 2023 (AMC Lincoln Square Theater); December 22, 2023 (United States)
- Running time: 103 minutes
- Countries: United States; Australia
- Language: English
- Budget: $25 million
- Box office: $220 million

Anyone but You is a 2023 romantic comedy film starring Sydney Sweeney and Glen Powell. Based on Much Ado About Nothing by William Shakespeare, the film was directed by Will Gluck, and written by Ilana Wolpert and Gluck. The supporting cast includes Alexandra Shipp, GaTa, Hadley Robinson, Michelle Hurd, Dermot Mulroney, Darren Barnet, Bryan Brown, and Rachel Griffiths.

Anyone but You premiered at the AMC Lincoln Square Theater on December 11, 2023, and was released theatrically in the United States by Sony Pictures Releasing on December 22, 2023. The film received mixed reviews from critics and emerged as a sleeper hit, grossing $220 million worldwide. This success was seen as the return of romantic comedies to theaters.

== Plot ==
Bea, a law student, meets bank employee Ben at a coffee shop. They immediately connect, spend the day together, and fall asleep on Ben's couch. Bea leaves before he wakes but returns after reconsidering. However, she overhears Ben speaking negatively about her to his friend Pete. Unaware that Ben is concealing how deeply hurt he was by her departure without explanation, Bea leaves with the wrong impression.

Six months later, Bea and Ben meet again when Bea's sister Halle begins dating Pete's sister Claudia. They remain frosty, each blaming the other for their unsuccessful date. Halle and Claudia become engaged and plan their wedding in Sydney.

Bea, who has recently ended her engagement to Jonathan and dropped out of law school, is dismayed to discover that she and Ben are travelling on the same flight to Sydney and will both stay at Claudia and Pete's parents' house before the wedding. Their hostility unsettles the wedding party, particularly after Bea's and Ben's exes, Jonathan and Margaret, respectively, also appear.

The wedding party schemes to bring Bea and Ben together to prevent their conflict from disrupting the wedding. They see through the plan, so Bea persuades Ben to pretend that they are a couple. This allows Ben to make Margaret jealous while Bea can discourage her parents from trying to reunite her with Jonathan.

They publicly display their supposed affection, including dancing at a boat party and reenacting a scene from Titanic. The performance ends with Bea falling into Sydney Harbour, prompting Ben to jump in after her. While they await rescue on a buoy, Bea tells him that she has withdrawn from law school.

After their rescue, Bea and Ben explain their conflicting accounts of the morning after they first met and arrange to visit the Sydney Opera House together. They return to the house and have sex. Afterwards, Bea remarks that everything she has done recently seems to have been a mistake, which disappoints Ben. Fearing that she will regret their encounter, he leaves while she is asleep, leaving Bea heartbroken.

On the morning of the wedding, Bea's parents learn from Pete that she has quit law school. Feeling betrayed, they tell the others that Bea and Ben's relationship was only pretend. After overhearing Halle and Claudia arguing, Ben persuades Bea to pretend to reconcile for the wedding's sake.

The ceremony proceeds smoothly until Bea sees Margaret kissing Ben. She leaves in tears, saying that she needs time alone. Ben rejects Margaret, declaring that he no longer has feelings for her. The wedding guests urge him to pursue Bea. Guessing where she has gone, Ben jumps from a cliff into the Pacific Ocean, asks the wedding party to contact harbour rescue, and is collected by helicopter, which takes him to the Opera House.

Ben finds Bea and explains that he left because he feared their having sex would become another regret for her. Bea replies that spending the night with him was the first thing she had not regretted in a long time. They reconcile and return to the reception as a couple, where Halle and Claudia reveal that their argument was staged to bring them together.

During the end credits, Jonathan and Margaret are shown getting together.

== Cast ==
- Sydney Sweeney as Beatrice "Bea" Messina
- Glen Powell as Ben
- Alexandra Shipp as Claudia, Pete's sister, who is marrying Halle
- GaTa as Pete, Ben's best friend
- Hadley Robinson as Halle Spence, Bea's sister, who is marrying Claudia
- Michelle Hurd as Carol, mother of Claudia and Pete
- Dermot Mulroney as Leo, father of Bea and Halle
- Darren Barnet as Jonathan, until recently Bea's fiancé
- Bryan Brown as Roger, father of Claudia and step-father of Pete
- Rachel Griffiths as Innie, mother of Bea and Halle
- Charlee Fraser as Margaret, Ben's former girlfriend and Pete and Claudia's cousin
- Joe Davidson as Beau, Margaret's current romantic partner

== Production ==
=== Development and casting ===
It was announced in January 2023 that Sydney Sweeney and Glen Powell would star in the then-untitled film to be directed by Will Gluck. Alexandra Shipp, Michelle Hurd, Bryan Brown, Darren Barnet, and Hadley Robinson joined the cast in February, with the additions of Dermot Mulroney, Rachel Griffiths, and GaTa announced the following month. In October 2024, The Hollywood Reporter, citing an anonymous source, reported that Sweeney had agreed to first play a supporting role in Sony's Spider-Man spin-off film Madame Web in order to get Anyone but You made.

=== Filming ===
Filming began in New South Wales in February 2023. In May, the film was titled Anyone but You. The movie was filmed in various locations across Sydney, including the Sydney Opera House, Marks Park in Bondi, Palm Beach, Jones Bay Wharf, the Queen Victoria Building, and Barrenjoey Lighthouse.

During production, a scene involving a rescue helicopter almost went wrong due to mechanical issues, requiring an emergency landing. While promoting the film on The Tonight Show Starring Jimmy Fallon, Sweeney revealed another incident that had happened during production; while filming the spider scene, the trained huntsman spider that was used actually bit her.

=== Music ===
The film's score was produced by Este Haim and Chris Stracey. The film's title track was released by Still Woozy. Natasha Bedingfield's "Unwritten" is prominently featured throughout the film.

== Release ==
Anyone but You premiered at AMC Lincoln Square Theater in New York City on December 11, 2023, and was released by Sony Pictures Releasing in the United States and Canada on December 22, 2023. In response to the success at the box office, Sony Pictures released an extended version of the film in theaters on February 9, 2024, ahead of Valentine's Day.

Anyone but You was released on digital platforms on February 20, 2024, and on Blu-ray on March 12, 2024.

== Reception ==
=== Box office ===
Anyone but You grossed $88.3 million in the United States and Canada, and $131.7 million in other territories, for a worldwide total of $220 million. Deadline Hollywood calculated the net profit of the film to be $103 million, when factoring together all expenses and revenues. As of 2024, it is the highest-grossing live-action Shakespeare film adaptation.

In the United States and Canada, Anyone but You was released alongside Migration, Aquaman and the Lost Kingdom, and The Iron Claw, and was projected to gross around $7 million from 3,055 theaters in its four-day opening weekend. The film made $3.5 million on its first day, including $1.2 million from Thursday night previews. It went on to debut to $6.3 million, finishing fourth at the box office. In its second weekend the film made $8.8 million, finishing fifth at the box office. In its third weekend the film made $9.5 million (an increase of 9%), finishing fifth again, before making $7.1 million and finishing in fourth the following week.

=== Critical response ===
The film received mixed reviews from critics. On the review aggregator website Rotten Tomatoes, 53% of 118 critics' reviews are positive, with an average rating of 5.6/10. The website's consensus reads: "Slick direction and a pair of tremendously watchable stars make Anyone But You a passably fizzy diversion despite a less than scintillating story." Metacritic, which uses a weighted average, assigned the film a score of 52 out of 100, based on 26 critics, indicating "mixed or average" reviews. Audiences surveyed by CinemaScore gave the film an average grade of "B+" on an A+ to F scale, while PostTrak reported filmgoers gave it an average of four out of five stars, with 57% saying they would definitely recommend the film.

Drew Gillis of The A.V. Club gave the film a B− grade, writing, "No one goes into a movie like Anyone But You for realism, nor should they. The film is made as fun escapism, and it succeeds at that. It's aspirational, but not in the Gossip Girl way of name-dropping designers and outwardly flexing their wealth." Common Sense Media's Tara McNamara gave it 3/5 stars and wrote, "thanks to the casting of appealing actors, the presence of Natasha Bedingfield's 'Unwritten' throughout the film, and the characters' new-adult-accurate dialogue... Gluck's end result is diverting enough that teens and young adults are highly unlikely to notice its flaws." The Hindu's Mini Anthikad-Chhibber said the film was "not wildly inventive", but was "powered by Sweeney and Powell's charisma, with able support from Brown and Hurd, eye candy thanks to Barnet... and laughs from Davidson."

The Guardian's Benjamin Lee gave the film 2/5 stars, writing, "Director Will Gluck... can't turn his leads into more than swimwear models, centring a romcom around them is like watching a kid force two dolls to kiss." David Rooney of The Hollywood Reporter said, "neither screen chemistry nor laughs can be manufactured, especially not with the kind of pedestrian writing in Will Gluck's Anyone But You, which does nothing to reanimate the moribund studio rom-com." Robert Moran of The Age gave it 2.5/5 stars, writing, "Watch the movie; there's no way these guys hooked up. Whatever sparkling chemistry we thought we saw in the film's immaculate PR drip-feed, it's barely there in the final product."

=== Accolades ===
Year	Award	Category	Nominee(s)	Result	Ref.
2024	People's Choice Awards	Comedy Movie of the Year	Anyone but You	Nominated	
2024	People's Choice Awards	Comedy Movie Star of the Year	Sydney Sweeney	Nominated	
2024	People's Choice Awards	Comedy Movie Star of the Year	Glen Powell	Nominated	
2024	GLAAD Media Awards	Outstanding Film — Wide Theatrical Release	Anyone but You	Nominated	
