= One of Those Hideous Books Where the Mother Dies =

2004 novel in verse by Sonya Sones

- First edition
- Author: Sonya Sones
- Language: English
- Genre: Young adult fiction
- Published: 2014 Simon & Schuster (US)
- Publication place: United States
- Media type: Print Hardcover, Paperback
- Pages: 272pp hardcover is 268pgs
- ISBN: 1-4169-0788-2
- OCLC: 865218164

One of Those Hideous Books Where the Mother Dies (2004) is a novel in verse by Sonya Sones. It is a young adult novel that tells the story of Ruby Milliken who is forced to go live with her famous movie star father, Whip Logan, in Los Angeles when her mother dies. Ruby is taken away from her friends and family, all of which she loves, and is forced to cope in the fake and artificial world of Hollywood. The novel is told mostly in blank verse with periodic interruptions of emails and letters Ruby exchanges with her friends. She soon finds herself torn between her old life and her new life.

== Plot ==
Fifteen-year-old Ruby reluctantly moves from Boston to Los Angeles after her mother passes away from cancer. She explains that her father, famous actor Whip Logan, divorced her mother before she was even born and the only time she ever saw him was in the movie theater. Another reason why Ruby is sad about leaving is her boyfriend Ray, whom she's in love with. Whip is extremely eager towards Ruby's arrival and insists on spending as much time with her as possible; making her resent the fact that he was never involved in her life before her mother's death. She starts her new high school, but feels out of place with the other students. She does however meet a fellow sophomore named Colette whose mother is also a celebrity. As time goes by, Ruby learns that Ray has been cheating on her with her best friend Lizzie. Whip is able to comfort her and eventually make her feel better. Ruby learns that while she was little, her aunt would arrange secret visit between her and Whip, and that her mother didn't want him involved in her life because he was gay. Ruby and Max, her father's assistant and also his partner in the story, have a very close relationship. The book ends with Ruby making up with Lizzie after she and Ray break up, and winning a leading part in Pygmalion in school along with her boyfriend Wyatt.

== Reception ==
A review in School Library Journal of One of Those Hideous Books Where the Mother Dies wrote "This is not just another one of those gimmicky novels written in poetry. It's solid and well written, and Sones has a lot to say about the importance of carefully assessing people and situations and about opening the door to one's own happiness.". Booklist found it ".. an unusual combination of over-the-top Hollywood fairy tale and sharp, honest story about overcoming grief." It was a YALSA 2005 Quick Pick for Reluctant Young Adult Readers and one of 2005's Best Books for Young Adults.

It has also been reviewed by Kirkus Reviews," Publishers Weekly, Horn Book Guides, and BookPage.
