= Sonya Sones =

American poet and author

- Sonya Sones (2011)
- Born: c. 1953; Boston, Massachusetts, U.S.
- Occupation: Author
- Writing career
- Genres: Children's books, Young adult, Women's fiction
- Notable works: What My Mother Doesn't Know, Stop Pretending: What Happened When My Big Sister Went Crazy
- Website: www.sonyasones.com

Sonya Sones (born c. 1953) is an American poet and author. She has written seven young adult novels in verse and one novel in verse for adults. The American Library Association (ALA) has named her one of the most frequently challenged authors of the 21st century.

== Biography ==
She was born in Boston, Massachusetts, was raised in nearby Newton, and lives in Southern California. After graduating from Hampshire College, she taught filmmaking at Harvard University; her other jobs have included baby clothes designer, animator, photographer, and film editor.

Sones is married to screenwriter Bennett Tramer, of Saved by the Bell. They teamed on a picture book, Violet and Winston, in 2009. It is illustrated by Caldecott Medal winner Chris Raschka.

=== Writing career ===
Her style differs from most contemporary writers in that her novels are told in verse form rather than prose. This means that they are a series of poems which, when read in order, tell a story.

The American Library Association has named several of her novels Best Books for Young Adults, as well as Quick Picks for Reluctant Young Adult Readers. Her debut novel, Stop Pretending: What Happened When My Big Sister Went Crazy, won numerous awards, including a Christopher Award, the Claudia Lewis Award for Poetry, the Myra Cohn Livingston Poetry Award, and a nomination for a Los Angeles Times Book Prize. The book was inspired by Sones' teenage experiences having a sister who was mentally ill.

Her third book was One of Those Hideous Books Where the Mother Dies (2004). Kirkus Reviews called it "a story worthy of Hollywood". Publishers Weekly said it was a "winning portrayal of a teenage girl's loves and losses".

Her fourth book, What My Girlfriend Doesn't Know, received a starred review from Booklist.

Her first novel in verse for adults, The Hunchback of Neiman Marcus, was published by Harper Collins in April 2011. It is about "a writer way behind on her deadline whose fiftieth birthday is rushing at her like a freight train," and deals with issues related to going through menopause, adjusting to an empty nest, and caring for aging parents. The film rights to The Hunchback of Neiman Marcus were optioned by actress Michelle Pfeiffer.

Sones' fifth novel in verse for young adults, To Be Perfectly Honest (A Novel Based on an Untrue Story), was published by Simon & Schuster in August 2013. It was nominated as a Best Book for Young Adults by YALSA.

Sones' sixth novel in verse for young adults, Saving Red, received a starred review from Booklist.

Sones' seventh novel in verse for young adults, The Opposite of Innocent, is a Junior Library Guild selection, and was named one of Barnes & Noble's Most Anticipated Contemporary YA Novels of 2018.

Sones has participated in multiple panel discussions at the annual Los Angeles Times Festival of Books. She was the moderator on the panel "Young Adult Fiction: Teens and Turmoil" with Gayle Forman, Jandy Nelson and Cynthia Kadohata during the 2010 event.

==== Censorship ====
In 2004, 2005, 2010, and 2011, the ALA included her novel What My Mother Doesn't Know on their list of the Top Ten Most Challenged Books, and it was named 31st on the ALA's list of the Top 100 Banned/Challenged Books of the 2000s. She regards her inclusion on the lists as "a badge of honor".

== List of works ==
=== Young adult novels in verse ===
- Stop Pretending: What Happened When My Big Sister Went Crazy (HarperCollins 1999)
- What My Mother Doesn't Know (Simon & Schuster 2001)
- One of Those Hideous Books Where the Mother Dies (Simon & Schuster 2004)
- What My Girlfriend Doesn't Know (Simon & Schuster 2007)
- To Be Perfectly Honest (Simon & Schuster 2013)
- Saving Red (HarperTeen 2016)
- The Opposite Of Innocent (HarperTeen 2018)

=== Adult novels in verse ===
- The Hunchback of Neiman Marcus (HarperCollins 2011)

=== Short stories in verse ===
Her short stories in verse are included in numerous anthologies, including:

- Love and Sex (2001) - a story called Secret Shelf
- Necessary Noise (2003) - a story called Dr. Jekyll and Sister Hyde
- Sixteen: Stories About that Sweet and Bitter Birthday (2004) - a story called Cat Got Your Tongue

=== Picture books ===
- Violet and Winston (Dial 2009) - with Bennett Tramer and illustrated by Chris Raschka.
- The Night before College (Grosset & Dunlap, 2014) - with Ava Tramer; illustrated by Max Dalton.
