= Joe Serafini =

American actor (born 1998)

Joseph Serafini
- Born: Joseph Ronald Serafini; January 22, 1998 (age 28); Bethel Park, Pennsylvania, U.S.
- Education: University of Michigan (BFA)
- Occupation: Actor
- Years active: 2005–present
- Partner(s): Frankie A. Rodriguez (2019-present; engaged)
- Website: Official website

Joseph Ronald Serafini (born January 22, 1998) is an American actor. He plays Seb Matthew-Smith in the Disney+ series High School Musical: The Musical: The Series.

== Early life and education ==
Serafini is from Bethel Park, Pennsylvania, a suburb of Pittsburgh. He was a longtime performer at the Pittsburgh CLO Academy (Pittsburgh Civic Light Opera), where he performed with their "Mini Stars" touring vocal group and earned a Gene Kelly Award scholarship. He graduated from Bethel Park High School in 2016. He graduated from the University of Michigan in 2020.

== Career ==
During his time with the Pittsburgh Civic Light Opera (CLO), he performed in several productions including A Musical Christmas Carol, Peter Pan, or The Boy Who Would Not Grow Up, Oliver!, Les Misérables, The Sound of Music, Into the Woods, and Anything Goes. He currently teaches master classes there. Outside of the CLO, his stage roles include The Music Man concert at Kennedy Center Concert Hall in Washington D.C. and The Burnt Part Boys with the Bald Theatre Company. He won a Level II Theatre Award at National YoungArts Week in Miami.

Serafini has starred in children's series Scientastic! He began starring in the recurring role Seb Matthew-Smith in Disney+ series High School Musical: The Musical: The Series in 2019. That December, it was announced he would be promoted to series regular for season 2. Serafini appeared in a guest role in the third season. On September 23, 2022, he and Andrew Barth Feldman released "In My Head", a duet written by songwriters Daniel Mertzlufft and Jacob Ryan Smith about the budding romance between two young men.

== Personal life ==
In 2020, Serafini stated that he is "bisexual, if I have to give a label." Since late 2019 he has been in a relationship with fellow High School Musical: The Musical: The Series actor Frankie Rodriguez, who plays his character's love interest on the show. In 2026, Rodriguez announced that they were engaged.

== Stage ==
Year	Title	Role	Venue
2005–2009	A Musical Christmas Carol	Tiny Tim / Turkey Boy	Byham Theater
2008	Peter Pan, or The Boy Who Would Not Grow Up	Michael Darling	Benedum Center
2009	Les Misérables	Gavroche	Benedum Center
2009	The Music Man concert	Winthrop	Kennedy Center Concert Hall
2010	Oliver!	Oliver Twist	Benedum Center
2011	The Sound of Music	Kurt von Trapp	Benedum Center
2012	The Burnt Part Boys		Grey Box Theatre
2013	Into the Woods	Jack	New Hazlett Theater
2014	Anything Goes	Billy Crocker	New Hazlett Theater
2026	Dear Evan Hansen	Evan Hansen	Engeman Theater

== Filmography ==
Year	Title	Role	Notes
2010	Scientastic!	Axel	
2019–2023	High School Musical: The Musical: The Series	Seb Matthew-Smith	Recurring role (season 1 & 4); Main role (season 2); Guest star (season 3)

== Discography ==
All song credits adapted from Spotify and Apple Music.

=== Singles ===
==== As lead artist ====
Year	Title	Album	Writer(s)	Producer(s)
2024	"Evergreen Love"	Evergreen Love	Joe Serafini, Lauren Gaynor, Nick Anton	No producer credited
2024	"Take it Slow"	Non-album singles	Drew Louis, Jayelle, Joe Serafini	Drew Louis
2024	"That Special"	Non-album singles	Cozi Zuehlsdorff, Joe Serafini	Matthew Tishler
2021	"The Climb"	High School Musical: The Musical: The Series: The Soundtrack: Season 2	Jessi Alexander, Jon Mabe	Tishler

==== As featured artist ====
Year	Title	Album
2023	"On My Mind" (Ben Ward, Joe Serafini)	You and I
2023	"Over Again" (Frankie Rodriguez, Joe Serafini)	High School Musical: The Musical: The Series: The Soundtrack: The Final Season
2022	"Wouldn't Change a Thing" (Adrian Lyles, Frankie Rodriguez, Joe Serafini, Saylor Bell)	High School Musical: The Musical: The Series: The Soundtrack: Season 3
2020	"Feliz Navidad" (Frankie Rodriguez, Joe Serafini)	High School Musical: The Musical: The Holiday Special: The Soundtrack
2020	"That's Christmas to Me" (Frankie Rodriguez, Kate Reinders, Julia Lester, Joe Serafini)	High School Musical: The Musical: The Holiday Special: The Soundtrack

=== Extended plays ===
Title	Details
Evergreen Love	Released: November 8, 2024; Label: Self-released; Format: Digital download, streaming; Track listing: 1. "Evergreen Love"; 2. "Snowman"; 3. "This Christmas"; 4. "The Christmas Song"
