= Adrian Lyles =

American musician and actor

- Born: January 4, 2005 (age 21); Dallas, Texas, USA
- Occupations: Actor; singer-songwriter
- Years active: 2022–present
- Musical career
- Genres: Pop; R&B; teen pop; Rock; Alternative
- Instruments: Vocals; piano
- Label: Hollywood
- Website: alylesofficial.com

Adrian Sterling Lyles born January 4, 2005 is an American musician and actor. He is signed to Hollywood Records, and starred as Jet on High School Musical: The Musical: The Series. He is based in Los Angeles.

== Early life ==
Lyles was raised in Dallas, Texas. He was trained at the Booker T. Washington High School for the Performing and Visual Arts.

== Career ==
On January 18, 2022, it was announced that Lyles would be joining the cast of High School Musical: The Musical: The Series on Disney+ in the role of Jet, Camp Shallow Lake's mysterious new kid. He made his television debut in season 3 of High School Musical: The Musical: The Series, and he is also featured on season 4. He also performs on the show's soundtrack, including on the original song "Right Place".

On September 20, 2024, Lyles released his debut single and video, "Formalize Me", on Hollywood Records. The song was produced by Phil Simmonds. On November 15, 2024, he released his second single, "Somewhere to Go". On January 24, 2025, Lyles released his third single, "King of Everything". His debut EP Horizons: Dawn was released on August 1, 2025. Lyles supported Almost Monday on their DIVE Tour, which began in Salt Lake City, Utah, on January 24, 2025, and ended on Los Angeles on February 22, 2025. The second installment in the Horizons trilogy, the three-song EP Horizons: Dusk, was released on September 5, 2025. He opened for Midnight 'Til Morning on their US tour in the fall of 2025. On November 22, 2025, Lyles sang the national anthem accompanied by the Disneyland Band at the 2025 Las Vegas Grand Prix. He is opening for Freya Skye on her Stars Align tour which began in February 2026, visiting the US and UK.

== Discography ==
=== EP ===
Title	Album details
Horizons: Dawn	Released: August 1, 2025; Formats: Digital download, streaming; Label: Hollywood Records
Horizons: Dusk	Released: September 5, 2025; Formats: Digital download, streaming; Label: Hollywood Records
Horizons: Night	Released: October 17, 2025; Formats: Digital download, streaming; Label: Hollywood Records

=== Compilation albums ===
Title	Album details
these are my favorite songs I’ve made so far	Released: January 30, 2026; Formats: Digital download, streaming; Label: Hollywood Records

=== Soundtrack albums ===
Title	Album details
High School Musical: The Musical: The Series: The Soundtrack: Season 3	Released: September 15, 2022; Formats: Digital download, streaming; Label: Walt Disney Records
High School Musical: The Musical: The Series: The Soundtrack: The Final Season	Released: August 9, 2023; Formats: Digital download, streaming; Label: Walt Disney Records

=== Singles ===
- "Nobody Knows My Name" (2019)
- "Formalize Me" (2024)
- "Somewhere to Go" (2024)
- "King of Everything" (2025)
- "Concrete Boy" (2025)
- "All That I Wanted Was You" (2026)

== Tours ==
Supporting

- Almost Monday – DIVE Tour (2025)
- Freya Skye – Stars Align Tour (2026)

== Filmography ==
Year	Title	Role	Notes
2022–23	High School Musical: The Musical: The Series	Jet	Season 3 (8 episodes), season 4 (5 episodes)
