= Vasthy Mompoint =

American voice and musical actress

- Born: Hoover, Alabama, U.S.
- Education: The American Musical and Dramatic Academy
- Occupations: actress, singer, songwriter, writer, director, choreographer
- Years active: 2000–present

Vasthy E. Mompoint is an American tv/film & theatre actress, singer/songwriter, dancer, voice-over artist, and director/choreographer.

Mompoint, the daughter of Haitian immigrants, grew up in Hoover, Alabama and graduated from Hoover High School in 1998. She has appeared in 8 original Broadway casts: Good Vibrations, Hot Feet, Mary Poppins, Ghost, Soul Doctor, Rocky the Musical, SpongeBob SquarePants (musical) also appearing in the television special on Paramount+, The Prom (musical) and also recreated her role in The Prom (film) on Netflix and served as Associate Choreographer. Vasthy received the honor of wearing The Legacy Robe (awarded to the cast member with the most Broadway ensemble credits) twice, first during Soul Doctor and then during The Prom (musical). After Vasthy's 8th Broadway show, LaDuca Shoes created a limited edition character shoe inspired by her: The Vasthy. Vasthy choreographed films Weird: The Al Yankovic Story on Roku, Cursed Friends on Comedy Central, and recently an episode of Miracle Workers (2019 TV series). She completed her television voice acting role as Layla on the 4Kids Entertainment edit of Winx Club and can be heard as the voice of Briny the Whale on Baby Shark's Big Show! on Nickelodeon. Vasthy runs and owns children's entertainment company: Vasthy & Friends. In 2022, Vasthy released her debut Children's Music album, "Sing, Dance, Play" which can be heard on all music streaming platforms.

== Theatre ==
=== Broadway ===
Source: Playbill

Year	Title	Role	Theatre
2005	Good Vibrations (musical)	Swing, Bakini Girl	Eugene O'Neill Theatre
2006	Hot Feet	Ensemble	Hilton Theatre
2006	Mary Poppins (musical)	Fannie	New Amsterdam Theatre
2012	Ghost the Musical	Ortisha, u/s Clara & Louise	Lunt-Fontanne Theatre
2013	Soul Doctor	Holy Beggar, Blind Guitarist, Pastor, u/s Nina	Circle in the Square
2014	Rocky the Musical	Linda McKenna, Apollo Girl	Winter Garden Theatre
2017	SpongeBob SquarePants (musical)	Security Guard, BFF, Plankton Dancer, Sardine Corps, u/s Sandy Cheeks	Palace Theatre
2018	The Prom (musical)	Ensemble, u/s Angie	Longacre Theatre
2021	Pass Over	Producer	August Wilson Theatre

== Filmography ==
=== Film ===
Year	Title	Role	Notes
2008	The Two of Us		Short film
2016	Better Off Single	Date #2	
2016	Tokyo Heights	Haiti	Short film
2016	Sas & Jake	1st AD	Television film
2018	Coming to Terms	Nurse	Short film
2019	The SpongeBob Musical: Live on Stage!	Security Guard, BFF, Plankton Dancer, Sardine Corps, Undersea Creature	Television film
2020	Lower East Asides	Coriander	Television film
2020	The Prom	Godspell Cast	
2022	Cursed Friends	Choreographer	Comedy Central
2022	Weird: The Al Yankovic Story	Choreographer	Roku

=== Television ===
Source: Playbill

Year	Title	Role	Notes
2005–07	Winx Club	Layla (voice)	4Kids Entertainment edit
2009	We Are New York	Sophie	Episode: "Love & Money"
2015	The Mysteries of Laura	Sexy Drunk #1	Episode: "The Mystery of the Ghost in the Machine"
2017	The Detour	Female Chorus #2	Episode: "The Heat"
2019	Indoor Boys	Molly	Episode: "Soup"
2020	Split	Adrienne	Episode: "Little Party"
2020	Awkwafina is Nora from Queens	Lehana	Episode: "Grandma & Chill"
2021	NCIS	Janique	Episode: "Sunburn"
2021	The Bold and the Beautiful	Dr. Ricks	3 episodes
2022–24	Baby Shark's Big Show!	Briny (voice)	8 episodes
2023	High School Musical: The Musical: The Series	Krystal	Episode: "HSM v. HSM"
2023	Miracle Workers (2019 TV series)	Choreographer	1 Episode, Season 4 on TBS

== Discography ==
Source: Audius

Year	Title	Artist	Featured Artists
2022	"Sing, Dance, Play"	Vasthy & Friends	Vasthy Mompoint, Lillias White, Ethan Slater, Lilli Cooper, Abby C. Smith, Danny Skinner, Brynn Williams, Mason Granger, Mike Messer, Stephen Jacobs, Adam Jacobs, The Dirty Sock Funtime Band, Juliane Godfrey, Richard Riaz Yoder, Lauren Molina, Rob Morrison, Jerusha Cavazos, & Angel Lin.

== Sources ==
- "Black Excellence on Broadway: Vasthy Mompoint". 16 February 2021.
