= Ilana Wolpert =

American screenwriter

- Education: Duke University
- Years active: 2019-present
- Notable work: Anyone but You (2023), High School Musical: The Musical: The Series (2019)
- Partner: Julia Lester

Ilana Wolpert is an American screenwriter, best known for her work on Anyone but You (2023).

== Early life and education ==
Ilana attended Duke University, graduating in 2015 with a double major in English and Theater.

== Career ==
Ilana Wolpert started her career in TV shortly after she graduated from Duke University. Her breakthrough was High School Musical: The Musical: The Series (2019). She then collaborated with Will Gluck to write Anyone But You.

== Filmography ==
=== Film ===
Year	Title	Work	Note
Year	Title	Screenwriter	Note
2023	Anyone But You	Yes	co-wrote with Will Gluck

=== Television ===
Year	Title	Work		Note
Year	Title	Screenwriter	Producer	Note
2021-2023	High School Musical: The Musical: The Series	Yes	No	17 episodes
2025	The Runarounds	Yes	Yes	(Note: Wrote the season 1 episode "Ride the Wave" and co-produced the first season)
