= Frankie A. Rodriguez =

American actor

- Born: Francisco A. Rodriguez; Selma, California, U.S.
- Occupation: Actor
- Years active: 2016–present
- Partner(s): Joe Serafini (2019-present; engaged)

Frankie A. Rodriguez is an American actor known for starring as Carlos Rodriguez on the Disney+ series High School Musical: The Musical: The Series.

== Early life ==
Rodriguez is from Selma, California and is of Mexican descent. Rodriguez is the youngest of three siblings. Rodriguez attended grade schools in Selma and later transferred to a private school earning his high school diploma in Sanger, California.

== Personal life ==
Rodriguez is part of the LGBTQ community. Since late 2019, Rodriguez has been in a relationship with fellow High School Musical: The Musical: The Series actor Joe Serafini, who plays his character's love interest on the show. In 2026, Rodriguez announced their engagement.

== Career ==
Rodriguez played the role of Mick in the Dekkoo series I'm Fine. He was promoted to series regular for the third and final season. He has had recurring and guest roles in the television series Modern Family and This Close as well as in the web series Raymond & Lane, That's the Gag, Only Children, and Going Up.

In February 2019, it was announced Rodriguez would star in the Disney+ series High School Musical: The Musical: The Series as Carlos Rodriguez, the color guard captain and student choreographer. The series premiered that November. Carlos is the first openly gay character in the High School Musical franchise.

In September 2025, Rodriguez joined the cast of Hulu series Chad Powers as the main role of Danny Cruz, the Catfish mascot of South Georgia football team. Rodriguez stars as a close friend and confederate of the titular character, quarterback Chad Powers, played by the series' creator, Glen Powell. The second season of the show, which premiered in September 2026, currently holds a Rotten Tomatoes approval rating of 93% based on 15 reviews.

== Filmography ==
Television and film
Year	Title	Role	Notes
2017–2019	I'm Fine	Mick	Recurring role (seasons 1–2); Main role (season 3)
2018	Call Me Daddy	Pedro	Short film
2019	Modern Family	Eduardo	2 episodes
2019	This Close	Set assistant	Episode: "Three's Company"
2019–2023	High School Musical: The Musical: The Series	Carlos Rodriguez	Main role
2020	Will & Grace	Christopher	Episode: "Filthy Phil, Part II”
2025–2026	Chad Powers	Danny Cruz	Main role
