= Julia Lester =

American actress and singer

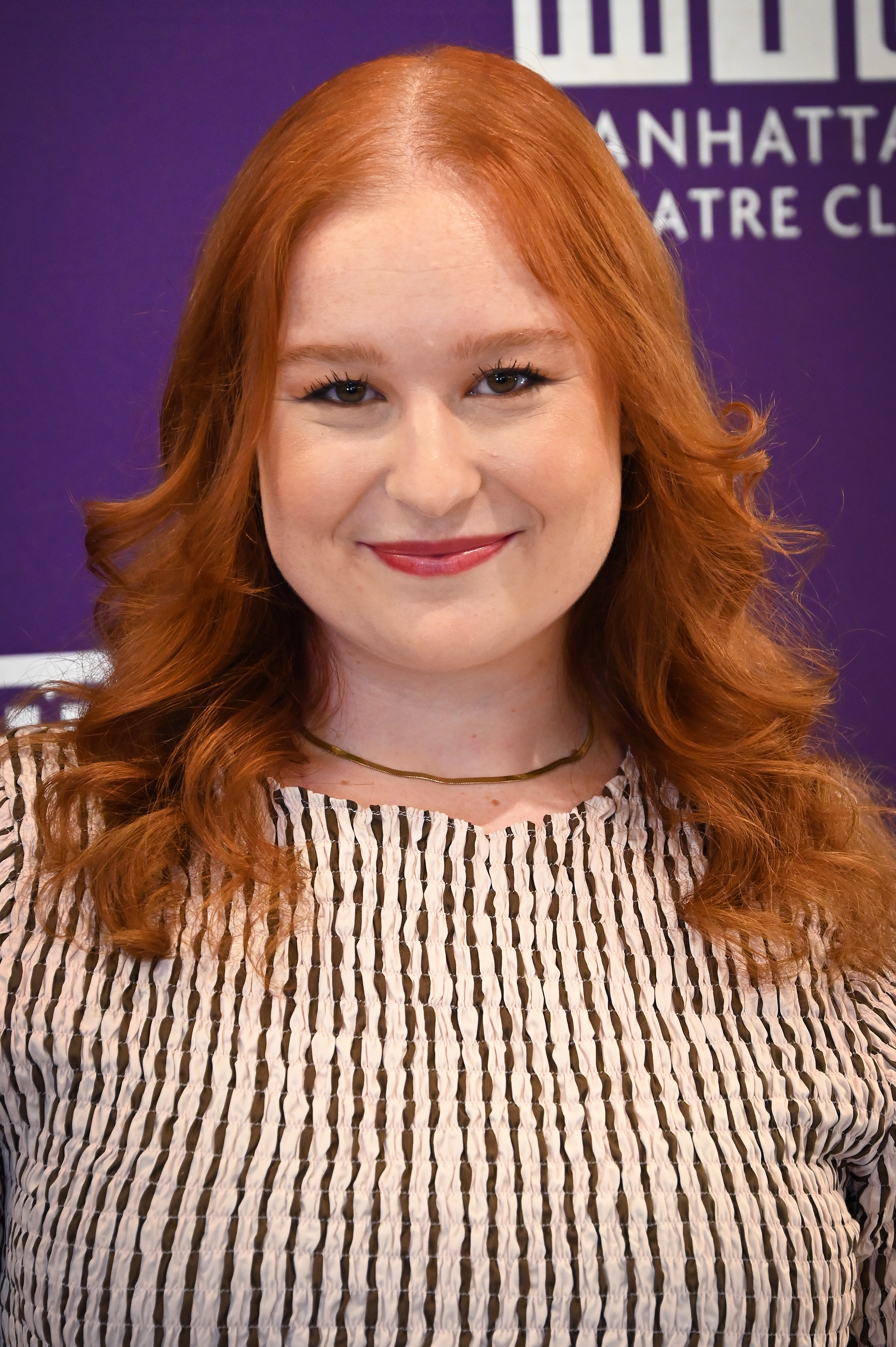
- Lester in 2025
- Born: January 28, 2000 (age 26)
- Occupations: Actress, singer
- Years active: 2009–present
- Known for: High School Musical: The Musical: The Series, Into the Woods
- Partner(s): Ilana Wolpert (2022–present; engaged)
- Father: Loren Lester
- Relatives: Peter Mark Richman (maternal grandfather); Lucas Richman (uncle)

Julia Lester (born January 28, 2000) is an American actress and singer. She is best known for her role as Ashlyn Caswell in the Disney+ series High School Musical: The Musical: The Series and for her portrayal of the role of Little Red Ridinghood in the 2022 Broadway revival of Into the Woods, for which she was nominated for the Tony Award for Best Featured Actress in a Musical.

== Early life and education ==
Lester is from Woodland Hills, California. She is Jewish. She is the youngest daughter of actors Kelly and Loren Lester, granddaughter of actors Helen and Peter Mark Richman, and niece of conductor/composer Lucas Richman.

She attended Calabasas High School.

== Personal life ==
Lester is queer and has been dating screenwriter Ilana Wolpert since 2022. The couple announced their engagement in June 2026.

Her character on High School Musical: The Musical: The Series also came out as queer in the third season.

== Acting credits ==
=== Film ===
| Year | Title | Role | Notes |
|---|---|---|---|
| 2011 | The One Who Got Away | Young Cherie | Short film |
| 2020 | Annie Minerals, Teen Therapist | Annie | Short film |
| 2021 | What She Said | | Associate producer |
| 2024 | Prom Dates | Hannah | |

=== Television ===
| Year | Title | Role | Notes |
|---|---|---|---|
| 2014 | Neckpee Island | Mona | Television film |
| 2016 | Bella and the Bulldogs | Gracie Crenshaw | Episode: "Bella in the Spotlight" |
| 2017 | Mom | Emily | 3 episodes |
| 2018 | The Thundermans | Smith | Episode: "Revenge of the Smith" |
| 2019 | Prince of Peoria | Suzie | 2 episodes |
| 2019 | Game Shakers | Tonya Mulligan | Episode: "Why Tonya" |
| 2019–2020 | Spirit Riding Free | Bebe Schumann | Voice |
| 2019–2023 | High School Musical: The Musical: The Series | Ashlyn Caswell | Main role; Disney+ series |
| 2023–2024 | Hailey's On It! | Tina / various | Voice, 5 episodes |
| 2025 | The Four Seasons | Lila | 4 episodes |

=== Theater ===
| Year | Title | Role | Venue | Ref. |
|---|---|---|---|---|
| 2009 | Les Misérables | Little Cosette | Regional | |
| 2010 | Into the Woods | Milky White | Regional | |
| 2012 | The Wizard of Oz | Dorothy Gale | Up On Stage | |
| 2015 | Les Misérables | Éponine Thénardier | Youth Musical Theatre | |
| 2016 | Carrie | Carrie White | Young Artists Ensemble | |
| 2017 | Joseph and the Amazing Technicolor Dreamcoat | Narrator / Ensemble | Kavli Theatre, Thousand Oaks | |
| 2018 | Into the Woods | Little Red Ridinghood | Cupcake Theater, Los Angeles | |
| 2018 | Next to Normal | Natalie | Hillcrest Center For The Arts, Thousand Oaks | |
| 2018 | Calvin Berger | Bret | Hudson Backstage Theatre, Hollywood | |
| 2022 | Into the Woods | Little Red Ridinghood | New York City Center, Off-Broadway | |
| 2022 | Into the Woods | Little Red Ridinghood | St. James Theatre, Broadway | |
| 2023 | The Secret Garden | Martha Sowerby | Ahmanson Theatre, Los Angeles | |
| 2023 | I Can Get It for You Wholesale | Miss Marmelstein | Classic Stage Company, Off-Broadway | |
| 2025 | All Nighter | Wilma | The Newman Mills Theater, Off-Broadway | |
| 2025 | Queens | Inna | Manhattan Theatre Club, Off-Broadway | |

== Awards and nominations ==
| Year | Award | Category | Work | Result |
|---|---|---|---|---|
| 2023 | Drama Desk Awards | Outstanding Featured Performance in a Musical | Into the Woods | Nominated |
| 2023 | Outer Critics Circle Awards | Outstanding Featured Performer in a Broadway Musical | Into the Woods | Nominated |
| 2023 | Tony Awards | Best Featured Actress in a Musical | Into the Woods | Nominated |
| 2025 | Lucille Lortel Awards | Outstanding Featured Performer in a Play | All Nighter | Nominated |
| 2025 | Drama Desk Awards | Outstanding Featured Performance in a Play | All Nighter | Nominated |
