= Kate Reinders =

American actress and singer (born 1980)

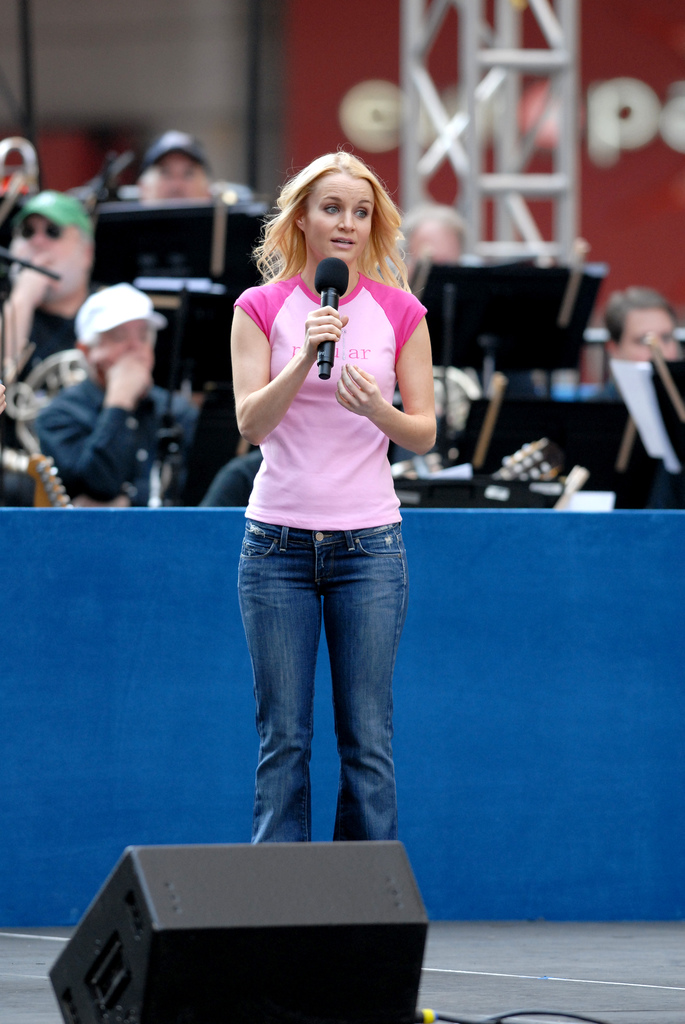
- Reinders at Broadway on Broadway in 2006
- Born: December 10, 1980 (age 45); Seattle, Washington, U.S.
- Occupations: Actress; singer
- Years active: 1995–present
- Spouse: Andrew Samonsky (m. 2016)
- Children: 1

Kate Reinders (born December 10, 1980) is an American actress and singer who has appeared on Broadway and in television programs. She is best known for her role as Miss Jenn in the Disney+ musical mockumentary series High School Musical: The Musical: The Series (2019–2023), as well as for her role as Portia in the original Broadway cast of Something Rotten!, for which she was nominated for a Grammy Award for Best Musical Theater Album in 2016.

== Career ==
Reinders' Broadway debut was in The Adventures of Tom Sawyer as a swing and understudy for characters Amy Lawrence and Becky Thatcher. She next joined the 2002 Broadway revival of Into the Woods as an understudy for Cinderella, Little Red Riding Hood, Milky White, and Rapunzel. Her first starring role was in the 2003 revival of Gypsy as June; she went on to play Caroline in the 2005 jukebox musical Good Vibrations.

Reinders played Glinda in the 2005 Chicago production of Wicked, alongside Ana Gasteyer as Elphaba; for this role, she received a Joseph Jefferson Award nomination for Best Actress in a Principal Role. She and Gasteyer finished their runs in the Chicago company on January 22, 2006. On May 30, 2006 Reinders replaced Megan Hilty as Glinda in the Broadway production. While playing this role she performed "Popular" in a Daily Double about Wicked on an all-celebrity episode of Jeopardy!. TV personality Nancy Grace gave the correct question. Reinders ended her run on January 7, 2007, along with former Chicago co-star Ana Gasteyer.

Reinders performed in the show Party Come Here, which ran as part of the Williamstown Theatre Festival from July 25 through August 5, 2007. She appeared in the play The Fabulous Life of a Size Zero at the Off-Broadway DR2 Theater in 2007.

Reinders was also a member of the band Tastiskank, along with Sarah Litzsinger. Reinders and Litzsinger co-starred opposite Constantine Maroulis in an independent TV pilot called Teachers. She also had a recurring role as Ginger on the third season of the television series Ugly Betty. Reinders starred as a regular character, "Paula Morgan", on the Lifetime series Sherri starring former The View co-host Sherri Shepherd. The show premiered on October 5, 2009.

Reinders returned to the Gershwin Theatre on October 27, 2008, and took part in The Yellow Brick Road Not Taken, a selection of scenes and songs cut from early drafts of the musical Wicked.

Reinders appears in the Mohegan Sun commercial "Everyone's Invited", singing to the tune of the Rick James song "Super Freak" alongside former Wicked co-star Saycon Sengbloh. She appears in the concert revue For The Record: Baz Luhrmann in Los Angeles, presented by ROCKLA for Show at Barre. It opened February 12, 2011, and closed June 30, 2011, with Jenna Leigh Green, Arielle Jacobs, and Tracie Thoms. Reinders voices the character Jezebel in the video game Saints Row: Gat out of Hell.

Reinders originated the role of Portia in the Broadway musical comedy Something Rotten!, which opened April 22, 2015, at the St. James Theatre. Her last performance was on July 16, 2016.

Reinders was seen recently on Broadway as the standby for Corky in Meteor Shower.

It was announced on October 8, 2018, that Reinders would assume the role of Cynthia Weil in the Broadway production of Beautiful: The Carole King Musical, replacing Kara Lindsay on October 19. As of 2019, she has been portraying Miss Jenn in the Disney+ series High School Musical: The Musical: The Series.

== Personal life ==
Reinders was born on December 10, 1980, in Seattle, Washington. She married fellow actor Andrew Samonsky in May 2016. Reinders gave birth to her son Luke in 2017.

== Filmography ==
=== Film ===
Year	Title	Role	Notes
1995	While You Were Sleeping	Beth	
2004	Kinsey	Female Student #1	
2008	Gerkie	Kate	short
2008	Transferants	Mother	short
2009	Freegan Love	Friend	short
2011	Certainty	Mary	
2013	Grudge Match	Groupie in Bar	
2014	Such Good People	Chloe	
2014	#Stuck	Alex	
2015	Russell Madness	Colleen	

=== Television ===
Year	Title	Role	Notes
2005	Blind Justice	Kim Chenowith	1 episode
2006	Jeopardy!	Glinda	1 episode
2008	Teachers	Katherine Holland	TV movie
2008	Ugly Betty	Ginger	2 episodes
2009	Sherri	Paula	7 episodes
2011	Modern Family	Princess	1 episode
2012–13	Work It	Kelly	13 episodes
2013	Anger Management	Hope	1 episode
2019–23	High School Musical: The Musical: The Series	Miss Jenn	Main role (Season 1-2, 4) Guest star (Season 3)
2025–present	Vampirina: Teenage Vampire	Oxana Hauntley	Recurring role

=== Video games ===
Year	Title	Role
2015	Saints Row: Gat out of Hell	Jezebel Mephistopheles

=== Theatre ===
Year	Show	Role	Notes
2001	The Adventures of Tom Sawyer	Swing u/s Amy Lawrence u/s Becky Thatcher	Broadway, April 26 – May 13, 2001
2001	Hair		Baystreet Theater
2002	Into the Woods	Snow White	Los Angeles
2002	Into the Woods	u/s Cinderella u/s Milky White u/s Rapunzel u/s Little Red Ridinghood	Broadway, April 30 – November 2002
2002	A Year with Frog and Toad	Various	Off-Broadway, November 2002 – January 2003
2003	Gypsy	June	Broadway, May 1, 2003 – May 30, 2004
2004	Nerds		New York Stage and Film, July 15–18, 2004
2005	Good Vibrations	Caroline	Broadway, February 2 – April 24, 2005
2005	Wicked	Glinda	Chicago production, 2005–2006
2006	Wicked	Glinda	Broadway, May 30, 2006 – January 7, 2007
2007	Party Come Here		Williamstown Theatre Festival, July 25 – August 5, 2007
2007	The Fabulous Life of a Size Zero		Off-Broadway
2008	The Yellow Brick Road Not Taken	Performer	Broadway, October 27, 2008
2011	For the Record: Baz Luhrmann	Performer	Show at Barre, Feb. 12 – June 30, 2011
2015	Something Rotten!	Portia	Broadway, April 22, 2015 – July 16, 2016
2018	Beautiful: The Carole King Musical	Cynthia Weil	Broadway, October 2018 – February 2019

== Awards and nominations ==
Year	Award	Category	Nominee	Result
2005	Joseph Jefferson Award	Best Actress in a Musical	Wicked	Nominated
2007	HBO Comedy Arts Festival	Breakout Award	TASTiSKANK comedy duo (w/ Sarah Litzsinger)	Won
2016	Grammy Awards	Best Musical Theater Album	Something Rotten!	Nominated
