= Verse novel =

Literary genre

A verse novel is a type of narrative poetry in which a novel-length narrative is told through the medium of poetry rather than prose. Either simple or complex stanzaic verse-forms may be used, but there are usually a large cast, multiple voices, dialogue, narration, description, and action in a novelistic manner.

== History ==
Verse narratives are as old as the Epic of Gilgamesh, the Iliad, and the Odyssey, but the verse novel is a distinct modern form. Although the narrative structure is similar to that of a novella, the organization of the story is usually in a series of short sections, often with changing perspectives. Verse novels are often told with multiple narrators, potentially providing readers with a view into the inner workings of the characters' minds. Some verse novels, following Byron's mock-heroic Don Juan (1818–24) employ an informal, colloquial register. Eugene Onegin (1831) by Alexander Pushkin is a classical example, and with Pan Tadeusz (1834) by Adam Mickiewicz is often taken as the seminal example of the modern genre.

The major nineteenth-century verse novels that ground the form in Anglophone letters include The Bothie of Toper-na-fuosich (1848) and Amours de Voyage (1858) by Arthur Hugh Clough, Aurora Leigh (1857) by Elizabeth Barrett Browning, Lucile (1860) by 'Owen Meredith' (Robert Bulwer-Lytton), and The Ring and the Book (1868-9) by Robert Browning. The form appears to have declined with Modernism, but has since the 1960s–70s undergone a remarkable revival. Vladimir Nabokov's Pale Fire (1962) takes the form of a 999-line poem in four cantos, though the plot of the novel unfolds in the commentary. Of particular note, Vikram Seth's The Golden Gate (1986) was a surprise bestseller, and Derek Walcott's Omeros (1990) a more predictable success. The form has been particularly popular in the Caribbean, with work since 1980 by Walcott, Edward Kamau Brathwaite, David Dabydeen, Kwame Dawes, Ralph Thompson, George Elliott Clarke and Fred D'Aguiar, and in Australia and New Zealand, with work since 1990 by Les Murray, John Tranter, Dorothy Porter, David Foster, Alistair Te Ariki Campbell, and Robert Sullivan. Australian poet-author Alan Wearne's The Nightmarkets, and sequels, are major verse novels of urban social life and satire.

The Australian poet C. J. Dennis had great success in Australia during World War I with his verse novels The Songs of a Sentimental Bloke (1915) and The Moods of Ginger Mick (1916).

The American author, poet, dramatist, screenwriter and suffragist and feminist, Alice Duer Miller published her verse novel, Forsaking All Others (1935), about a tragic love affair, and had a surprising hit with her verse novel, The White Cliffs (1940) later dramatized and filmed, but retaining and expanding the poems as voice-over narration, as The White Cliffs of Dover (1944).

The parallel history of the verse autobiography, from strong Victorian foundation with Wordsworth's The Prelude (1805, 1850), to decline with Modernism and later twentieth-century revival with John Betjeman's Summoned by Bells (1960), Walcott's Another Life (1973), and James Merrill's The Changing Light at Sandover (1982), is also striking. The forms are distinct, but many verse novels plainly deploy autobiographical elements, and the recent Commonwealth examples almost all offer detailed representation of the (problems besetting) post-imperial and post-colonial identity, and so are inevitably strongly personal works.

There is also a distinct cluster of verse novels for younger readers, most notably Karen Hesse's Out of the Dust (1997), which won a Newbery Medal. Hesse followed it with Witness (2001). Since then, many new titles have cropped up, with authors Sonya Sones, Ellen Hopkins, Steven Herrick, Margaret Wild, Nikki Grimes, Virginia Euwer Wolff, and Paul B. Janeczko all publishing multiple titles. Thanhha Lai's Inside Out & Back Again (2011) won the National Book Award.

Verse novels exist in other languages as well. In Hebrew, for example, Maya Arad (2003) and Ofra Offer Oren (2023) published verse novels composed of sonnets.

== Versification ==
Long classical verse narratives were in stichic forms, prescribing a meter but not specifying any interlineal relations. This tradition is represented in English letters by the use of blank verse (unrhymed iambic pentameter), as by both Brownings and many later poets. But since Petrarch and Dante complex stanza forms have also been used for verse narratives, including terza rima (ABA BCB CDC etc.) and ottava rima (ABABABCC), and modern poets have experimented widely with adaptations and combinations of stanza-forms.

The stanza most specifically associated with the verse novel is the Onegin stanza, invented by Pushkin in Eugene Onegin. It is an adapted form of the Shakespearean sonnet, retaining the three quatrains plus couplet structure but reducing the meter to iambic tetrameter and specifying a distinct rhyme scheme: the first quatrain is cross-rhymed (ABAB), the second couplet-rhymed (CCDD), and the third arch-rhymed (or chiasmic, EFFE), so that the whole is ABABCCDDEFFEGG. Additionally, Pushkin required that the first rhyme in each couplet (the A, C, and E rhymes) be unstressed (or "feminine"), and all others stressed (or "masculine"). In the rhyme scheme notation capitalizing masculine rhymes, this reads as aBaBccDDeFeFGG. Not all those using the Onegin stanza have followed the prescription, but both Vikram Seth and Brad Walker notably did so, and the cadence of the unstressed rhymes is an important factor in his manipulations of tone.

== Recent examples ==
- The Boys Who Stole the Funeral, Les Murray (Sydney: Angus & Robertson, 1980)
- The Illusionists, John Fuller (London: Secker & Warburg, 1980)
- Midquest: A Poem, Fred Chappell (Baton Rouge: Louisiana State University Press, 1981)
- The Nightmarkets, Alan Wearne (Penguin, 1986)
- The Golden Gate, Vikram Seth (London: Faber & Faber, 1986)
- Love, Death and the Changing of the Seasons, Marilyn Hacker (New York: Norton, 1986)
- Desperate Characters: A Novella in Verse and Other Poems, Nicholas Christopher (New York: Viking, 1988)
- Omeros, Derek Walcott (London: Faber & Faber, 1990)
- Akhenaten, Dorothy Porter (St Lucia, QLD: University of Queensland Press, 1992)
- The Floor of Heaven, John Tranter (Sydney: Collins Angus & Robertson, 1992)
- The Monkey's Mask: An Erotic Murder Mystery, Dorothy Porter (Sydney: Hyland House Publishing, 1994)
- History: The Home Movie, Craig Raine (Harmondsworth: Penguin, 1994)
- Turner, David Dabydeen (London: Jonathan Cape, 1994)
- Prophets, Kwame Dawes (Leeds: Peepal Tree Press, 1995)
- Jacko Jacobus, Kwame Dawes (Leeds: Peepal Tree Press, 1996)
- Autobiography of Red, Anne Carson (New York: Knopf, 1998)
- Bill of Rights, Fred D'Aguiar (London: Chatto & Windus, 1998)
- Fredy Neptune: A Novel in Verse, Les Murray (Manchester: Carcanet, 1999)
- Jack, the Lady Killer, H. R. F. Keating (Hexham: Flambard, 1999)
- What a Piece of Work, Dorothy Porter (Sydney: Picador, 1999)
- Bloodlines, Fred D'Aguiar (London: Chatto & Windus, 2000)
- Whylah Falls, George Elliott Clarke (Vancouver: Polestar, 1990; rev. ed. 2000)
- Tiepolo's Hound, Derek Walcott (London: Faber & Faber, 2000)
- Maori Battalion: A Poetic Sequence, Alistair Te Ariki Campbell (Wellington: Wai-te-ata Press, 2001)
- The Beauty of the Husband, Anne Carson (London: Jonathan Cape, 2001)
- Ancestors, Edward Kamau Brathwaite (New York: New Directions Press, 2001)
- The Lovemakers, Alan Wearne (Penguin, 2001)
- Darlington's Fall, Brad Leithauser (New York: Knopf, 2002)
- Time's Fool: A Tale in Verse, Glyn Maxwell (Boston: Mariner Books, 2002)
- Wild Surmise, Dorothy Porter (Sydney: Picador, 2002)
- Captain Cook in the Underworld, Robert Sullivan (Auckland: Auckland University Press, 2002)
- 8 Stages of Grace, Diane Brown (Vintage, 2002)
- The Prodigal, Derek Walcott (London: Faber & Faber, 2004)
- The Poet Slave of Cuba: A Biography of Juan Francisco Manzano, Margarita Engle (Juvenile/Children's) (New York: Henry Holt, 2006)
- Nine Hours North, Tim Sinclair (Melbourne: Penguin, 2006)
- El Dorado, Dorothy Porter (Sydney: Picador, 2007)
- Sharp Teeth, Toby Barlow (New York: HarperCollins, 2008)
- Zorgamazoo, Robert Paul Weston (New York: Penguin/Razorbill, 2008)
- I & I, George Elliott Clarke (Fredericton, New Brunswick: Goose Lane Editions, 2009)
- View from Mount Diablo, Ralph Thompson (Leeds: Peepal Tree Press, 2003; rev. & annotated ed., 2009)
- Love, Dishonor, Marry, Die, Cherish, Perish: A Novel, David Rakoff, posthumous (New York: Doubleday, 2013)
- The Long Take, Robin Robertson, (Picador, 2018)

== Novels in verse for teens ==
- Psyche in a Dress, Francesca Lia Block (2006)
- The Poet X, Elizabeth Acevedo (2018)
- The Foal in the Wire, Robbie Coburn (2025)
- Frenchtown Summer, Robert Cormier (New York: Random House, 1999)
- Heartbeat, Sharon Creech (New York: HarperCollins, 2004)
- The Weight of Water, Sarah Crossan (London: Bloomsbury, 2011)
- Death Coming Up the Hill, Chris Crowe (New York: Houghton Mifflin Harcourt, 2014)
- Keesha's House, Helen Frost, (2003)
- Dark Sons, Nikki Grimes (New York: Hyperion Books, 2005)
- Downtown Boy, Juan Felipe Herrera (Albuquerque: University of New Mexico Press, 1999)
- By the River, Steven Herrick (Crows Nest: Allen and Unwin, 2004
- Aleutian Sparrow, Karen Hesse (New York, Simon & Schuster, 2003)
- Out of the Dust, Karen Hesse (New York: Scholastic, 1997)
- Witness, Karen Hesse (New York: Scholastic, 2001)
- Crank, Ellen Hopkins (New York: Simon Pulse, 2006)
- Glass, Ellen Hopkins (New York: Margaret K. McElderry Books, 2007)
- Impulse, Ellen Hopkins (New York: Margaret K. McElderry Books, 2007)
- Burned, Ellen Hopkins (New York: Margaret K. McElderry Books, 2007)
- Identical, Ellen Hopkins (New York: Margaret K. McElderry Books, 2008)
- Tricks, Ellen Hopkins (New York: Margaret K. McElderry Books, 2009)
- Perfect, Ellen Hopkins (2011)
- Tilt, Ellen Hopkins (2012)
- Rumble, Ellen Hopkins (2014)
- My Book of Life By Angel, Martine Leavitt (2012)
- Realm of Possibility, David Levithan (New York: Knopf Books for Young Readers, 2008)
- Street Love, Walter Dean Myers (New York, CarperCollins, 2007)
- Long Way Down, Jason Reynolds (New York: Simon & Schuster, 2017)
- The Weight of the Sky, Lisa Ann Sandell, (New York: Viking, 2006)
- Song of the Sparrow, Lisa Ann Sandell, (New York: Scholastic, 2008)
- One of Those Hideous Books Where the Mother Dies, Sonya Sones (New York: Simon & Schuster Children's Publishing, 2001)
- Stop Pretending: What Happened When My Big Sister Went Crazy, Sonya Sones (New York: HarperTeen, 2001)
- What My Mother Doesn't Know, Sonya Sones (New York: Simon & Schuster Children's Publishing, 2001)
- What My Girlfriend Doesn't Know, Sonya Sones (New York, Simon & Schuster Children's Publishing, 2007)
- Jinx, Margaret Wild (New York: Simon Pulse, 2004)
- One Night, Margaret Wild (New York: Random House, 2006)
- Glimpse, Carol Lynch Williams (New York: Simon & Schuster/Paula Wiseman Books, 2010)
- Make Lemonade, Virginia Euwer Wolff (New York: Scholastic, 1994)
- True Believer, Virginia Euwer Wolff (New York, Simon Pulse, 2002)
- This Full House, Virginia Euwer Wolff (New York: HarperCollins, 2009)

== See also ==
- Epic poetry
