= Diamond Willow (book) =

2008 children's book by Helen Frost

- Author: Helen Frost
- Language: English
- Genre: Children's fiction
- Publisher: Frances Foster/Farrar, Straus & Giroux
- Publication date: April 10, 2008
- Pages: 128
- ISBN: 978-0-374-31776-8
- OCLC: 78993164

Diamond Willow is a 2008 children's book written by Helen Frost. It was published in 2008 by Frances Foster Books, an imprint of Farrar, Straus and Giroux.

Set in Alaska, it tells the story of Diamond Willow, a young girl of Athabascan and European descent who lives in Alaska.

== Background and publication history ==
In writing Diamond Willow, Helen Frost was partially inspired by her time living in Telida, Alaska, where she had worked as a teacher.

Diamond Willow was published on April 10, 2008, by Frances Foster Books, an imprint of Farrar, Straus, and Giroux. An audiobook was released in 2009. Diamond Willow was voiced by Jennifer Ikeda. An ebook was released in 2016 by Square Fish.

It was marketed for 10 to 14 year olds.

== Summary ==
Living in the fictional town of Old Fork, Alaska, Diamond Willow is a twelve-year-old girl of Athabascan and European descent. She was told that she was named after diamond willow. Her parents own sled dogs, which Diamond Willow enjoys taking care of.

Taking the form of a verse novel, Diamond Willow's story is told through diamond-shaped free form poetry. Each of her poems has a hidden message, in bold, showing her inner thoughts and feelings. The story is interspersed with sections told by animals, such as foxes and chickadees, which are eventually revealed to be Diamond Willow's ancestors.

== Reception ==
Frost's use of poetry in the book was widely praised. Reviewers focused, in particular, on the hidden poem-within-a-poem format and the depth it added to the story.

A reviewer in The Bulletin of the Center for Children's Books described Frost's use of the Alaskan landscape as "metaphoric gold" which resulted in an "elegant and moving story".

In Kirkus Reviews, the reviewer was critical of the asides written by the character's ancestors, feeling that these disrupted the flow of the story. Overall, the reviewer described the book as "flawed, but not fatally so".

A review by Marilyn Taniguchi in School Library Journal praised Frost's writing and storytelling, and described the book as a "complex and elegant novel" and Sylvia Vardell in Book Links described it as a "gentle coming-of-age story". Booklist reviews described Diamond Willow as "easy to read" and recommended the book "to fans of dog stories and to readers who liked Gary Paulsen's Hatchet". The Horn Book Magazine described the book as a good for readers looking for a "dog and dogsled story". The review was more critical of the ancestors taking the form of animals, feeling that Frost's decision to include them "stretches credulity just a little too far".

A School Library Journal review criticized the audiobook, saying that it had the potential to "confuse listeners" and that it "might be useful when used in conjunction with the book". Feeling that the story did not "transfer well to audio format", the reviewer lamented the loss of the book's poem-within-a-poem format. The reviewer was also critical of Jennifer Ikeda's casting as Diamond Willow, but praised her voice acting.

== Awards ==
The Indiana Center for the Book awarded Diamond Willow the Best Books of Indiana award in the Children's/Young Adult category. Diamond Willow was also a nominee for the 2011 Rebecca Caudill Young Readers' Book Award.
