= John Lennard =

British academic and writer

- Born: 1964 (age 61–62); Bristol, England
- Occupation: Academic

Academic background
- Education: Bristol Grammar School
- Alma mater: New College, Oxford (B.A., DPhil)
- Thesis: But I Digress (1991)
- Doctoral advisor: Malcolm Parkes

John Lennard (born 1964) is Professor of British and American Literature at the University of the West Indies (UWI), Mona, Jamaica, and a freelance academic writer and film music composer. Since 2009 he has been an independent scholar in Cambridge and a bye-Fellow of Christ's College, Cambridge.

== Biography ==
Lennard grew up in Bristol, England and was educated at Bristol Grammar School and New College, Oxford. His doctoral thesis, on the use of brackets in English literature, was published by the Clarendon Press as the monograph But I Digress, and called both "a delight-house of a book" and "the strangest book (I think) I have ever reviewed". He taught at the Open University, the University of London, and the University of Cambridge before taking up his present chair at UWI. He is also a member of the Global Virtual Faculty of Fairleigh Dickinson University, and the general editor of the Genre Fiction Sightlines and Monographs series for Humanities-E-Books.

Beyond his unusual work on punctuation Lennard's major work has been in literary handbooks for students in the last years of school and first of college. The Poetry Handbook: A Guide to Reading Poetry for Pleasure and Practical Criticism (OUP, 1996, 2nd edition 2005) has now sold more than 25,000 copies and has an associated website. It was followed by The Drama Handbook: A Guide to Reading Plays (co-written with Mary Luckhurst, Professor of Modern Drama at the University of York), trying to bridge the gap between text-based literary and more performative teaching.

Lennard's more recent involvement with work on genre fiction, particularly Crime Writing, Science fiction, and Children's literature, reflects a long history of 'unliterary' reading and interest in literature as a means of living as well as a subject of aesthetic and historical study. He has variously protested the application of class snobbery to literature, and But I Digress features parentheses by Elvis Costello and Robert B. Parker as well as chapters on Marvell, Coleridge, and T. S. Eliot. Both Handbooks were similarly eclectic in choosing examples, and his annotated edition of the award-winning Jamaican verse-novel View from Mount Diablo by Ralph Thompson considers both the crime novel and the Bildungsroman as models.

Lennard's former students include Steven Poole of The Guardian, Tristram Stuart and screenwriter Helen Raynor.

== Works ==
- But I Digress: The Exploitation of Parentheses in English Printed Verse (Clarendon Press, 1991) ISBN 0-19-811247-5
- The Poetry Handbook (Oxford University Press, 1996). Second edition, 2005. ISBN 0-19-926538-0
- The Drama Handbook: A Guide to Reading Plays (Oxford University Press, 2002). With Mary Luckhurst. ISBN 0-19-870070-9
- Of Modern Dragons and other essays on Genre Fiction (Humanities-Ebooks, 2007; Troubador, 2008; Kindle 2010). ISBN 978-1-84760-038-7 (digital); ISBN 978-1-84760-069-1 (paperback)
- Literature Insights: Shakespeare, Hamlet (Humanities-Ebooks, 2007; Troubador, 2008; Kindle 2010). ISBN 978-1-84760-028-8 (digital ed.); ISBN 978-1-84760-084-4 (paperback)
- Genre Fiction Sightlines: Reginald Hill, On Beulah Height (Humanities-Ebooks, 2007; Kindle 2010). ISBN 978-1-84760-035-6
- Genre Fiction Sightlines: Walter Mosley, Devil in a Blue Dress (Humanities-Ebooks, 2007; Kindle 2010). ISBN 978-1-84760-042-4
- Genre Fiction Sightlines: Octavia Butler, Xenogenesis / Lilith's Brood (Humanities-Ebooks, 2007; Kindle 2010). ISBN 978-1-84760-036-3
- Genre Fiction Sightlines: Ian McDonald, Chaga / Evolution's Shore (Humanities-Ebooks, 2007; Kindle 2010). ISBN 978-1-84760-039-4
- Genre Fiction Sightlines: Tamora Pierce, The Immortals: Wild Magic, Wolf-Speaker, The Emperor Mage, The Realms of the Gods (Humanities-Ebooks, 2007; Kindle 2010). ISBN 978-1-84760-037-0
- Literature Insights: Paul Scott, The Raj Quartet & Staying On (Humanities-Ebooks, 2007; Kindle 2010). ISBN 978-1-84760-056-1
- Literature Insights: Vladimir Nabokov, Lolita (Humanities-Ebooks, 2008; Kindle 2010). ISBN 978-1-84760-097-4
- Ralph Thompson, View from Mount Diablo: An Annotated Edition (Peepal Tree Press & Humanities-Ebooks, 2009; Kindle 2010). ISBN 978-1-84523-144-6 (paperback); ISBN 978-1-84760-093-6 (digital ed.)
- Of Sex and Faerie: Further essays on Genre Fiction (Humanities-Ebooks, Troubador, & Kindle, 2010). ISBN 978-1-84760-171-1 (PDF) ISBN 978-1-84760-172-8 (Reflowable format) ISBN 978-1-84760-173-5 (paperback)
- Literature Insights: Shakespeare, King Lear (Humanities-Ebooks & Kindle, 2010). ISBN 978-1-84760-174-2 (PDF) ISBN 978-1-84760-175-9 (Kindle)
- Literature Insights: Reading William Faulkner: Go Down, Moses, & Big Woods (Humanities-Ebooks & Kindle, 2012). ISBN 978-1-84760-198-8 (PDF) ISBN 978-1-84760-199-5 (Kindle)
- Talking Sense About Fifty Shades of Grey, or, Fanfiction, Feminism, and BDSM (Kindle Direct Publishing, 2012). ASIN BOOAK02ZG1
- Tolkien's Triumph: The Strange History of The Lord of the Rings (Kindle Direct Publishing, 2013). ASIN BOOG3CBZSA
- The Exasperating Case of David Weber, or, The Slow Death of the Honorverse (Kindle Direct Publishing, 2015). ASIN BO15TGKWPC
- Mock-death in Shakespeare's Plays (Kindle Direct Publishing, 2016). ASIN BO1JSRLAHM
- ‘Punctuation: and – Pragmatics’, in A. Jucker, ed., Historical Pragmatics (Benjamins, 1995), pp. 65–98. ISBN 90-272-5047-2/1-55619-328-9
- "Writing to Form: Verse", in John Singleton & Mary Luckhurst, eds, The Creative Writing Handbook: Techniques for New Writers (Macmillan, 1996; 2nd edition, 1999), pp. 164–200. ISBN 0-333-79226-2
- "Classical Learning in Regional Voices: The Work of Derek Walcott, Wole Soyinka, and Tony Harrison", in Jean Paul Lehners, Guy Schuller, & Janine Goedert, eds, Regions, nations, mondialisation: Aspects politiques, economiques, culturels (Centre Universitaire de Luxembourg, 1996), pp. 139–49. ISBN 2-87971-060-X
- "CrimeFiction", "Period", "Punctuation", ‘Rhyme", "Apestail", "Apostrophe", "Blank", "Caesura", "Guillemets", "Mise-en-Page", "Nota", "Parenthesis", "Rhyme Scheme", "Scriptio Continua" & "Wrenched Accent", in J. A. Cuddon, ed., A Dictionary of Literary Terms and Literary Theory (4th ed., rev. Claire Preston, Blackwell, 1998; Penguin, 1999). ISBN 0-631-20271-4
- "Mark, Space, Axis, Function: towards a (new) theory of punctuation on historical principles’, in Anne Henry, Joe Bray, & Miriam Fraser, eds, Ma(r)king the Text: The presentation of meaning on the literary page (Ashgate, 2000), pp. 1–11. ISBN 0-7546-0168-4
- "Reginald Hill", in Jay Parini, ed., British Writers Supplement IX (Scribner’s Sons, 2004), pp. 109–26. ISBN 0-684-31237-9
- "R. K. Narayan", ‘Paul Scott’, & ‘Derek Walcott’, in Jay Parini, ed., World Writers in English (2 vols, Scribner’s Sons, 2004), II. 385–407, 645–64, 721–46. ISBN 0-684-31289-1
- "Ian Rankin", in Jay Parini, ed., British Writers Supplement X, (Scribner’s Sons, 2004), pp. 243–60. ISBN 0-684-31312-X
- "Introduction" to The Oxford Dictionary of Rhymes (OUP, 2006), pp. ix–xxxii. ISBN 0-19-280636-X
- "Staging ‘the Holocaust" in England", & (with Dawn Fowler) "On War: Charles Wood’s Military Conscience", in Mary Luckhurst, ed., The Blackwell Companion to Modern British and Irish Drama (Blackwell, 2006). ISBN 1-4051-2228-5
- "Patrick O'Brian", in Jay Parini, ed, British Writers Supplement XII, (Scribner's Sons, 2006), pp. 247–66. ISBN 0-684-31511-4
- "Quantity and Quality in Literary Studies", in Journal of Education and Development in the Caribbean, vol. 11, no. 1 (December 2009), pp. 23–9
- ‘In/visible Punctuation’, in Visible Language 45.1/2 (Summer 2011), pp. 123–39.
- "(Absent) Gods and the Sharing Knife: Lois McMaster Bujold’s Myths of Integration", in Janet Brennan Croft, ed., Lois McMaster Bujold: Essays on a Modern Master of Science Fiction and Fantasy (Jefferson, NC: McFarland & Co., 2012). ISBN 978-0-7864-6833-1
- Design and layout for Laura Curino, Passion (trans. Mary Luckhurst & Gabriella Giannachi), in Lizbeth Goodman, ed., Mythic Women/Real Women: Plays and Performance Pieces by Women (Faber & Faber, 2000), pp. 87–112. ISBN 0-571-19140-1
- Commentary, background material, and student notes in April De Angelis, A Laughing Matter (Faber & Faber/Out of Joint, 2002). ISBN 0-571-21772-9
- Programme essay and notes for Royal National Theatre/Out of Joint co-productions of She Stoops to Conquer and A Laughing Matter (London & touring, 2002–03)
- "Dirty Weekend", The Times Literary Supplement 4591 (29/3/91)
- "Señor Vivo and the Coca Lord", The Times Literary Supplement 4603 (21/6/91)
- "Making Plays with Shakespeare", The English Review 4.1 (9/93)
- "Shop Talk", London Review of Books 16.2 (27/1/94)
- "When Thou Hast Done...", Essays in Criticism XLIV.2 (4/94)
- "Major Horsefeathers", Times Literary Supplement 4751 (22/4/94)
- "The Redeemed Vicarage", London Review of Books 16.9 (12/5/94)
- "The Gold in Them Thar Hills", Threepenny Review 67 (Fall 1996)
- "Criminally Good", The Guardian (London), 4/9/97, G2, p. 10
- "Mugging Up on India", The Historical Journal 41.2 (1998)
- "The Left Hand of Marlowe", Modern Language Review 96.3 (7/01)
- "To Review the Reviewer", New Theatre Journal 2 (6/02)
- "Men, Myths, and Marlowe", Modern Language Review 99.1 (1/04)
- "The Prodigal", The Liberal : Poetry, Politics, Culture (February/March 2005), pp. 36–7
- "Informing a Voice", The Sunday Observer (Kingston), 18/12/05, Lifestyle, p. 22
- "Without Title", The Liberal : Poetry, Politics, Culture (February/March 2006), p. 55
- "Reservoirs of Blood", The Liberal : Poetry, Politics, Culture (Autumn 2007), pp. 54–5
- "Plunder and Protection", Jamaica Journal 31.3 (12/08), pp. 80–1
- "Chapters in Verse", The Liberal : Poetry, Politics, Culture (Spring 2009), pp. 34–6
