= Mary Luckhurst =

British playwright and director

Mary Luckhurst is a British academic, author, and theatre practitioner. She is the Head of the School of Arts at the University of Bristol, becoming the first woman to hold the position. Lockhurst is the author of Dramaturgy: A Revolution in Theatre (2006) and editor of A Companion to Modern British and Irish Drama 1880–2005, as well as other works.

== Academic career ==
Luckhurst has degrees in both arts and sciences and was educated at New Hall, Cambridge (BA (Modern Languages) and PhD (English)), Middlesex University (MA), and the London School of Economics (Msc). She is described as a playwright, dramaturg and director in the front matter of her book published by Cambridge University Press.

A dual citizen of Britain and Australia, Luckhurst was appointed Professor and Director of Artistic Research and Creative Practice at the University of Melbourne from 2014 to 2018 as part of a scheme that recruited academics and educators across multiple disciplines. From 1998 to 2014, she was based at the University of York as its first Lecturer in Modern Drama and later became a co-initiator and co-founder of the innovative Department of Theatre, Film, TV and Interactive Media. The Higher Education Academy awarded her a National Teaching Fellowship in recognition of her contributions to university teaching.. Also, she has held visiting professorships at City University of New York, the La Trobe, the University of Melbourne, the Sydney and the Oxford.

== Selected works ==
- On Directing, co-edited with Gabriella Giannachi (Faber & Faber, 1999; St Martin’s Press New York, 1999)
- On Acting, co-edited with Chloe Veltman (Faber & Faber, 2001).
- The Drama Handbook: A Guide to Reading Plays, co-authored with John Lennard (Oxford University Press, 2002). Arabic edition, 2009.
- Theatre and Celebrity in Britain 1660-2000, co-edited with Jane Moody (Palgrave, 2005).
- Dramaturgy: A Revolution in Theatre (Cambridge University Press, 2006). Spanish edition La Palabra que Empieza por D (Edicion Fundamentos, 2008).
- Blackwells Companion to Modern British and Irish Drama, 1880-2005, ed. Mary Luckhurst (Blackwells, 2006).
- Contemporary British and Irish Drama, co-edited with Nadine Holdsworth (Blackwells, 2008).
- Playing for Real: Actors on Playing Real People, co-edited with Tom Cantrell (Palgrave, 2010).
- Series Editor since 2004 with Professor Maggie Gale: Routledge New Perspectives on Modern and Contemporary Playwrights
- Theatre and Ghosts: Materiality, Performance and Modernity, co-edited with Emilie Morin (Palgrave, 2014).
- Caryl Churchill, (Routledge, 2015).
- Theatre and Human Rights After 1945: Things Unspeakable, co-edited with Emilie Morin (Palgrave, 2015).

=== Recent edited journals ===
- Guest editor of special issue on ‘Actresses in 21st Century Australasia’, The Australasian Drama Studies Association Journal, no.75, 2019.
- Guest editor with Sandra Mayer on special issue, ‘Theatre and Persona: Performing Celebrity and Transgression’, Persona Studies Journal, vol.5., no.2, 2020.
- Guest editor with Matt Hargrave on special issue ‘Comedy and Combating Mental Health Stigma’, Comedy Studies, Autumn 2020.
