= The Music of Dolphins =

Story by Karen Hesse

- First edition cover
- Author: Karen Hesse
- Cover artist: Greg Harlin
- Language: English
- Genre: Children novel
- Publisher: Scholastic Press
- Publication date: 1996
- Publication place: United States
- Media type: Print (Paperback)
- Pages: 181
- ISBN: 0-590-89797-7

The Music of Dolphins, by Karen Hesse, is a children's book that follows the story of Mila, a feral child raised by a pod of dolphins around the Florida Keys and Caribbean. "Mila" is an abbreviated form of the Spanish word milagro, meaning "miracle".

The novel uses a narrative structure that parallels Mila's increasing comprehension of the English language. At the novel's opening, when Mila is with the dolphins and cannot speak English, the book is written in a different font and more complex writing. This is representative of Mila's thoughts more so than her actual writing abilities. The text moves to simple English as Mila learns the language, becomes more complex as her emotions increase, and reverts to simple English when she yearns for the dolphins. There are a few inclusions of newspaper articles or other pieces written in third person, but the book is predominantly written in first person.

Although the novel is fiction, it is based on real life experiences of people who have worked with feral children.

== Summary ==
Mila, a girl raised by dolphins, is discovered and captured on a cay and taken to a scientific research facility. She progresses quickly and meets Shay, another feral child who looks like Mila. Shay is a quiet girl. As more time passes, Mila falls in love with music and a boy named Justin, and wonders why she progresses so quickly while Shay does not. Shay is sent to another facility and a doctor explains to Mila that of all the feral children that have been studied, Mila is the only one who has continued progressing. Soon, Mila finds her newfound knowledge slipping away and regresses. She requests to be released back to the ocean and, after some discussing among her caregivers, she is returned to the ocean to reunite with her dolphin family.

== Characters ==
Mila: The protagonist of the story, a girl raised by dolphins. She is captured on a cay and taken to a scientific research facility, where she is taught to be a human by Doctor Beck, who helps her in her struggle to learn English and about human life. At one point, Mila learns that her real name could be Olivia, and that her father, who is Cuban, is alive. Mila is currently 17.

Doctor Elizabeth Beck: The main doctor that takes care of Mila, she helps her learn to speak and to be a human.

Shay: A friend of Mila, a little girl. Shay was said to be kept in solitary confinement in Idaho. Later, she is taken from the research facility to a foster home.

Justin: Doctor Beck's son. At first he is resentful and jealous of Mila and the attention Dr. Beck gives her. Later he tells Mila that Dr. Beck's interest in Mila is more scientific than familial. However, the two fall in love in the climax of the story.

Sandy: A friend of Dr. Beck's. She sometimes acts as a caregiver of Mila, who finds Sandy to be the most sympathetic and understanding person in the story.

Mr. Aradondo: A janitor at the facility where Mila is kept. He appears to be afraid of Mila, though he openly expresses concern for her well-being when she develops a high fever. He reminds Mila of her grandfather.

Doctor Troy and Doctor Peach: Colleagues of Doctor Beck, who also help Mila and Shay learn about music and the English language.

Dolphins: The ones that raise Mila. Her dolphin mother has a spotted tail or fluke, and wise eyes; she had lost her baby calf shortly before finding Mila.

== Use of Multi-genre Elements ==
Hesse incorporates different writing styles and fonts in each section of the book to help express Mila's thoughts as well as extra context. The fonts vary as Mila learns English. When Mila knows no language, a smaller font is used in italics. This implies that they are Mila's thoughts, but not originally in a comprehensible language such as English. As Mila begins to learn English, the font changes. A larger, more boxy font is used. The letters look more clunky and less fluid to show that Mila is still new to the language. The font continues to change as Mila learns more English and begins to understand what it means to be English. The font gets smaller when her language understanding gets more complex. Towards the end of the book, Mila regresses to her previous state. The font style helps the reader see this regression occur. The ending of the story is once again written in the small, fluid italics. The reader can infer that Mila abandoned all language at this point and can return to the dolphins.

The inclusions of different genres and writing styles help provide context for the reader. At the beginning of the book, Hesse includes a newspaper article describing how the coast guard found Mila. This allows the reader to understand the events leading up to the start of the book, such as how Mila ended up in the research facility. Much of the beginning of the book is spoken dialog. This shows how Mila is discovering language and learning how to be a human. Hesse later includes some journal entries written by Mila. The journals demonstrate Mila's advanced understanding of language. It also provides readers with more thoughts from Mila.
