= Tricks (novel) =

Book by Ellen Hopkins

- Author: Ellen Hopkins
- Language: English
- Genre: Young adult
- Publisher: Simon & Schuster
- Publication date: August 25, 2009
- Publication place: United States
- Pages: 640

Tricks is a young adult verse novel by Ellen Hopkins, released in August 2009. It tells the converging narratives of five troubled teenage protagonists. It is noted for its gritty realism in addressing issues of sexual activity and drug use for a young adult readership. It has been banned in some places due to its references to drug use, sexual themes, language and many other disturbing topics, all involving teens.

== Plot ==
In the novel Tricks, the story begins with five teenagers, all residing in various parts of the United States.

The first character, Eden Streit, lives with her father, mother, and younger sister, Eve. Being a daughter of a minister also comes with expectations, such as not having sex until marriage and marrying men within the Christian faith. But for Eden, that doesn’t matter with Andrew, her boyfriend. Her only problem is trying to keep their relationship a secret from her parents.

The second character, Seth Parnell, lives with his father after his mother died from cancer a year and a half earlier. Seth struggles with identifying his sexuality after he breaks up with his girlfriend, Janet Winkler. He meets Loren and is catapulted into a new kind of relationship.

The third character, Cody Bennett, doesn’t know who his biological father is and spends his time with his step-father Jack. Jack hasn’t been feeling well, and Cody starts to drink.

The fourth character, Whitney Lang, lives with her mother, while her father works and lives in another city nearby and her sister, Kyra, attends college. Whitney is disconnected with her mother and likes when her dad is home since she sees him as her hero. Whitney hooks up with Lucas at one of Kyra’s performances and they hit it off, but she still worries about committing to the relationship with him.

The fifth character, Ginger Cordell, encounters rape from an early childhood and deals with keeping these secrets from her family. Ginger’s only friend is Alex, and she has begun questioning how she feels about her.

Eden’s parents find out about her relationship with Andrew, and assume that she is being controlled by the devil, and so she is sent to Tears of Zion. There, she is kept in captivity and forced to do work that would supposedly rid her of evil. She starts giving a worker named Jerome sex in exchange for food, shampoo, and other treats. She hopes that Jerome can be the key to her escape.

Loren moves away and leaves Seth, and Seth’s dad finds out he is gay, so he kicks him out of the house. He goes to live with Carl, an older man he met at a bar, and moves with him to Vegas as his companion.

Lucas leaves Whitney by dumping her after taking her virginity, and she turns to Bryn for support. She gives herself to him, and leaves her family to move with him to Vegas for his photography business.

Ginger’s brother, Sandy, is run over by a motorcycle, and Gram goes with him to the hospital. Ginger is raped again by one of her mother’s boyfriends, and she finds out that Iris is charging them to have sex with her. She takes her mother’s money and leaves with her friend, Alex, and they go to stay with Alex’s aunt, Lydia, in Vegas.

Cody’s step-father, Jack, dies from cancer, and Cody takes on the responsibility of paying for bills. He gets deep into online gambling, drifting away from Ronnie, whom he believes he loves.

Eden manages to escape with the help of Jerome and decides to ditch him at a gas station. She succeeds, and gets rides from truck drivers to Vegas. She uses sex for money and means of survival until she finds a place that helps young people in similar situations. She finds Andrew’s mother’s e-mail, and sends her a message. Andrew’s mother replies, and Andrew sends a message shortly after. They both express relief that she is alive, and hope to see her again soon.

Seth becomes attracted to Jared, a man he meets in the gym, and they have sex. Carl reveals that he had paid Jared to act as bait, and kicks Seth out. Seth goes online and looks for a new man to stay with.

Bryn is revealed to have acted a certain way to get Whitney to fall in love with him. He cheats on Whitney, forces her to record their sex and have sex with other people, and gets her addicted to drugs. Toward the end of the book, the author seems to make Whitney to be losing more of herself. One night, she takes an overdose and ends up in the hospital with her family around her. Her mother cries for her and says that she wants them to have a better relationship now, and that she does care about her. Whitney’s father is angry, and her sister is said to be angry that Whitney stole all of the attention.

Lydia sets up Alex and Ginger in the stripping business, and that becomes how they get money and a place to stay. Sex becomes less about love and more about surviving. They get arrested because they were discovered by Vegas Vice, and they are sent to a place that was supposed to help them get their life back together. Ginger calls Gram and finds out that Iris is dying from an STD. She decides to go back home and take care of her siblings, while Alex stays; she is revealed to be pregnant, and she says that she will be a better mother to her child than Ginger or Alex’s mothers were to them.

Cody gets into business with Lydia, partnering up with Misty occasionally in having sex with men. He does not believe himself to be gay, but he is described as feeling that he has to do anything to get money and support the rest of his family. His relationship with Ronnie becomes distant, and he hopes that she would find a better man who deserves her. On one of their “dates”, Misty’s boyfriend, Chris, finds them almost naked with their client. He is expressed as being very angry with Misty, and he attacks them, putting them in the hospital. Cody wakes up occasionally there, and Misty and their client are revealed to be dead. Cody hears voices while he is partially conscious. He hears his mother speaking to him, comforting him, and begging him not to leave her.

== Characters ==
- Eden Ruth Streit, a sixteen-year-old girl, lives in a conservative and religious family since her father is a local preacher.
- Seth Parnell, a “good-looking” (436) seventeen-year-old boy, deals with defining his sexuality and experiencing break-ups and trading sex for a home.
- Whitney Lang, a fifteen-year-old girl lives in the shadows of her older sister and deals with being addicted to drugs and searching for affection.
- Ginger Cordell, a sixteen-year-old girl, lives with her five siblings, mother, and grandmother who raises them.
- Cody Bennett, one of the protagonists of the story, has to deal with taking care of his family after his step-father dies.

== Style ==
Karin's Book Nook complimented the author's work in the novel by saying "Ellen Hopkins, once again, comes through for her readers with this spellbinding novel-in-verse." Additionally, Kirkus adds that "Hopkins's pithy free verse reveals shards of emotion and quick glimpses of physical details. It doesn't matter that the first-person voices blur, because the stories are distinct and unmistakable."

== Theme ==
One reviewer explained that "[Tricks] shows the bad decisions teenagers make." Kirkus also added that Tricks is about "[g]raphic sex, rape, drugs, bitter loneliness, despair - and eventually, blessedly, glimmers of hope."

== Reception ==
School Library Journal praised Tricks as "[a] graphic, intense tale that will speak to mature teens." Karin's Book Nook said, "Ellen Hopkins utilizes her trademark realistic voice; there isn't any sugar-coating of the subject matter here to weave the story of five total strangers to form a heartbreaking look at what some people are forced to do simply to survive." Also, Publishers Weekly commented that "[e]ach story is unique (one teen needs money, another was thrown out because of his sexuality, still another was simply looking for love from the wrong person); while readers may connect with some characters more than others, they will long remember each painful story."

According to the American Library Association's Office of Intellectual Freedom, Tricks was the 98th-most banned and challenged book in the United States between 2010 and 2019.

== Controversy ==
The treatment of controversial topics, such as drug use, sexual abuse, and suicide, has led to intense discussions and questions in the United States regarding the depiction of these subjects in youth and educational literature. The engagement with these topics contributes to the book being appreciated by readers. At the same time, this open handling of sensitive content has repeatedly led to objections and censorship since its publication, such as removal from school libraries and curricula. As a result the book got banned repeatedly since 2009.

According to Ms. Hopkins herself, her books are typically banned due to their sexually explicit nature, spirituality, and inclusion of queer characters and characters of color. Tricks was reported as the #1 most banned book in the 2022-2023 year, having been banned from libraries and classrooms in 11 states. In 2024, it was the fifth most challenged book according to the American Library Association, with 33 challenges. The book has been ranked 98th most banned book for the 2010-2019 decade. As of 2024, the book has been banned at schools in Texas, Utah, Virginia, Florida, Iowa, Pennsylvania, Wisconsin, Tennessee, Michigan, Kentucky, South Carolina, Wyoming, and Arkansas. In 2025, it was tied for the fifth most banned and challenged book in the United States.
