= Lisa Ann Sandell =

American writer

- Born: November 23, 1977 (age 48); Delaware, United States
- Education: University of Pennsylvania (BA)
- Occupations: Writer and Editor
- Writing career
- Period: 2006–2009
- Genres: Young adult, historical, novel in verse
- Notable works: Song of the Sparrow, A Map of the Known World, The Weight of the Sky
- Website: www.lisaannsandell.com

Lisa Ann Sandell is an American author and editor of young adult literature. She is the author of three novels, A Map of the Known World, Song of the Sparrow and The Weight of the Sky, and the Editorial Director of the narrative nonfiction imprint at Scholastic Books.

== Biography ==
Before she published her first book, Sandell traveled to Israel for a birthright trip and interned in Jerusalem, Israel, at the news magazine The Jerusalem Report. The experience informed Sandell's first novel, The Weight of the Sky, a novel in verse published by Viking Children's Books in 2006.

In 1999, Sandell received a BA in Medieval and Renaissance Literature from the University of Pennsylvania. Her honors thesis on Sir Thomas Malory's treatment of Lancelot in Le Morte d'Arthur provided the inspiration for her second novel, Song of the Sparrow. Her last published work, A Map of the Known World, was published in 2009.

Sandell moved to New York City in 2000, and began work as a children's book editor at Scholastic. She is the Editorial Director of Scholastic Focus, the narrative nonfiction imprint of Scholastic.

Sandell is married to Liel Leibovitz, conservative Israeli pundit and editor-at-large for Tablet magazine.

== Young adult novels ==
- The Weight of the Sky (2006)
- Song of the Sparrow (2007)
- A Map of the Known World (2009)

== Short stories ==
- "See Me", included in the young adult anthology 21 Proms, which was published in 2007.

== Awards ==
- New York Public Library Book for the Teen Age, 2007, for "The Weight of the Sky"
- "Voice of Youth Advocates Best Science Fiction, Fantasy, and Horror titles, 2007, for "Song of the Sparrow"
