= True Believer (Wolff novel) =

2001 verse novel by Virginia Euwer Wolff

- First edition
- Author: Virginia Euwer Wolff
- Language: English
- Genre: Verse novel
- Published: 2001 by Atheneum Books
- Publication place: United States
- Media type: Print
- Pages: 264 pp
- Awards: 2001 National Book Award for Young People's Literature; 2002 Michael L. Printz Honor book
- ISBN: 978-0-6898-2827-0
- OCLC: 44578822
- LC Class: PZ7.5.W65
- Preceded by: Make Lemonade
- Followed by: This Full House

True Believer is a verse novel for young adults, written by Virginia Euwer Wolff and published by Atheneum Books in 2001. It has been published as an audiobook read by Heather Alicia Simms, and translated into Chinese, German, Italian, and Japanese. It won the U.S. National Book Award for Young People's Literature and was named a Michael L. Printz Honor book.

A review in Publishers Weekly observed that Wolff writes with "delicacy and sensitivity".

== Characters ==
- Verna LaVaughn: LaVaughn is the protagonist of the story. She is named after her two grand aunts, Verna and LaVaughn, but goes by the name LaVaughn. LaVaughn is fifteen years old, telling what her life is like through that age. She tells how she falls in love with Jody, only to find him kissing another guy. LaVaughn briefly tells how her father dies, (he was an innocent bystander of a tragic shooting.) She tells how her mom is raising her in a slightly destitute type neighborhood, and also a little about her past.
- LaVaughn's mother: In the story, LaVaughn's mother does not get a name. LaVaughn's mom is a single mother. She is taking care of her daughter and herself alone, because her husband died. In True Believer, LaVaughn doesn't talk about her as much as she does with others, but when she does, you can get a feel for how wonderful and supportive her mother is LaVaughn even tells of her mother possibly finding love.
- Jody: Jody comes back to live in LaVaughn's apartment. He left because where he and LaVaughn are from, children die at a young age and he and his mother did not want that to be the result of his life. He is the same age as LaVaughn, (fifteen). In the book, not many people get the chance to go to college. Like LaVaughn, he is determined not be another statistic. He wants to get into college and move away from the neighborhood. He hopes to win a swimming scholarship for college.
- Myrtle: In the book, Myrtle is LaVaughn's best friend. She grew up with LaVaughn, her father is a drug addict, trying to turn his life around in rehabilitation. Myrtle may not be as determined to go to college as Jody and LaVaughn are but she does want to stay on the right track. Myrtle joins a church, but this also pushes back their close friendship with LaVaughn, because LaVaughn doesn't go to church.
- Annie: Annie is another childhood friend of LaVaughn's in the book. She did not grow up with LaVaughn like Myrtle did, but she did go to school with them, and after a while became their best friend. Annie's background isn't really described in True Believer. Annie also joined a church and after a while became very attached to it. LaVaughn did not attend church with them at all, therefore their friendship of dwindled. Myrtle and Annie did not have as much to talk to LaVaughn about, because LaVaughn had different views. LaVaughn questions God a lot throughout the book, while Annie and Myrtle goes go with what is dealt to them through the church.
- Patrick: Patrick, born into a poor family, is described as LaVaughn's new biology partner in the book. When she is moved into that class, Patrick is really nice to her, As days progress, she says Patrick wears the same green shirt everyday, and Patrick's speech is terribly slow. he is really good at science, biology in particular.
- Jolly: Jolly is an old friend of LaVaughn's. LaVaughn babysat Jolly's kids when she was younger. (In the book before True Believer, Make Lemonade told Jolly’s story). Jolly is a senior in true Believer, and is eighteen with two children, Jeremy, and Jilly. Jolly had a rough time growing up, the guys that impregnated her left her way before the children were born, she raises the kids on her own, in a substandard apartment. Jolly is trying to make a way for her kids, and herself so she goes back to high school so she too can graduate on time.
- Lester: LaVaughn's mom's new “boyfriend.’” She describes him as: “His name is Lester. He is at her new job. He is in charge of something there. And he is coming to our house to eat supper.” (page 105). Lester comes over to dinner that night, and compliments on everything LaVaughn's mom cooks. For a while everything is going good, and her mom is even thinking about moving into a house with Lester and LaVaughn as a sort of “family”. LaVaughn's mom finds out that Lester calls her every night from a pay phone, and the worse: he took out money from LaVaughn's savings account to pay for his own mortgage. After that, LaVaughn's mom leaves him.
- b's up

== Reception and themes ==
According to an interview with Horn Book Magazine, Wolff never identified the race of the characters purposefully, because she wanted readers to have their own views of them.

Horn Book Magazine mentioned the theme of romantic feeling that can take over everyday life. Roger Sutton, the reviewer, said that "LaVaughn's portrayal of her life at school and home becomes shaped by her feelings for Jody." Publishers Weekly summarized the overall theme as "one of the pivotal issues of puberty": abstinence.
