= Witness (novel) =

2001 book by Karen Hesse

- First edition
- Author: Karen Hesse
- Cover artist: Darren Hopes
- Language: English
- Genre: Historical
- Publisher: Scholastic
- Publication date: September 1, 2001
- Publication place: United States
- Media type: Print (hardcover)
- Pages: 161 pp
- ISBN: 0-439-27199-1
- OCLC: 45715317
- LC Class: PZ7.H4364 Wk 2001

Witness is a free poetry book of historical fiction written by Karen Hesse in 2001, concentrating on racism in a rural Vermont town in 1924. Voices include those of Leanora Sutter, a 12-year-old African American girl; Esther Hirsh, a 6-year-old girl from New York; Sara Chickering, a quiet spinster farmer; Iris Weaver, a young restaurant owner, bootlegger and illegal booze runner; Reynard Alexander, the town newspaper editor; Merlin van Tornhout, an arrogant teen 18-year-old; Johnny Reeves, the town preacher, Percelle Johnson, the town constable, Viola Pettibone, a store owner, along with her husband, Harvey Pettibone —some of whom joined the newly arrived Ku Klux Klan including: Johnny Reeves, Merlin Van Tornhout, and shopkeeper Harvey Pettibone.

In Witness, Hesse continues the distinctive poetic style she pioneered in Out of the Dust (1998). The two books are part of a notable recent cluster of verse novels for children and young adults.

It is in first-person narration, though with each new page a different narrator is used forming a series of monologues by different characters affected by the same series of actions. The book is split into five acts.

== Point of view ==
The story is told from the point of view of many of the characters in the town. It tells their reactions to the Ku Klux Klan, their beliefs, and how they cope with the threats and dangers facing them, including those coming from people they may know and may not suspect. Each one has to take a moment to reflect on themselves and decide what path they are going to walk.

== Main characters ==
In no particular order, the characters are: Merlin Van Tornhout, an 18-year-old man struggling to find the difference between right and wrong, Leanora Sutter, a 12-year old African American girl, Esther Hirsh, a 6-year-old Jewish girl, Johnny Reeves, the town preacher, Sara Chickering, a non-married woman that takes Esther under her wing when she moves to the country, Harvey Pettibone, a shopkeeper that joins the Klan, Viola Pettibone, the wife of Harvey, Iris Weaver, a restaurant owner and rum runner, Reynard Alexander, the town newspaper editor, Percelle Johnson, the town constable, and Fitzgerald Flitt, the town doctor.
