= Phoenix Rising (novel) =

1994 realistic novel by Karen Hesse

- First edition cover
- Author: Karen Hesse
- Publisher: Henry Holt & Co.
- Publication date: April 1, 1994
- ISBN: 0-8050-3108-1

Phoenix Rising is a 1994 realistic novel by Karen Hesse. It is a about 13-year old Nyle Sumner, who learns about love and death after victims of a nuclear accident come to stay at her grandmother's Vermont farmhouse.

== Plot ==
Thirteen-year old Nyle Sumner and her grandmother's lives are disrupted by a nuclear accident in Vermont. Everyone that lives anywhere near the accident suddenly has to wear masks, test everywhere for high levels of radiation, and watch everything they eat and drink to make sure it's not contaminated until the government gives the all clear. Nyle and her grandmother live together on a sheep farm, near the nuclear plant in fictional Cookshire. She and her grandmother take in two evacuees from the accident: fifteen-year old Ezra Trent and his mother, Miriam.

Ezra and his parents were all sickened by radiation, with Mr. Trent dying five days before Ezra and Mrs. Trent were taken in by Gran and Nyle. Nyle is terrified to let herself care about Ezra because she believes that if she lets herself care for him, she will end up losing him, just like her mother, father, and grandfather. Ezra and Mrs. Trent stay in the back bedroom of the farmhouse, which Nyle calls "the dying room" because it was where her mother and grandfather had died when they were sick. She initially pushes Ezra away, but they eventually grow closer over the course of his recovery at the farm.

== Characters ==
- Nyle Sumner – The protagonist of the novel, Nyle is thirteen during the events of "Phoenix Rising". The abandonment of her father and the deaths of her mother and grandfather profoundly impacted Nyle. She faces many obstacles in confronting her fears of death and love, which she is able to reconcile with after victims of a nuclear accident come to stay with her and Gran.
- Gran – Nyle's grandmother, primary caretaker, and parental figure. Gran maintains flocks of sheep on her farm. She is portrayed as wise, reserved, and hard-working in all things. It was her decision to allow victims of the nuclear accident to move into the farmhouse, and she quietly, sometimes sternly, guides Nyle through the hardships and tender moments of the Trents' stay at the farm.
- Gramp – Nyle's grandfather, who died from cancer in the back bedroom two years before the beginning of the novel. Nyle and Gramp were very close, and his death reinforced her fear of abandonment.
- Nyle's mother – Unnamed in the novel, Mrs. Sumner died of cancer in the back bedroom when Nyle was six. Prior to her death, Nyle's father took his wife and child to Gran and Gramp's farm, and then abandoned them both there. The death of Nyle's mother, and simultaneous loss of both her parents, traumatized Nyle and imparted a deep fear of abandonment.
- Nyle's father – Unnamed in the novel, it is not specified which of Nyle's parents was Gran and Gramp's child, but it is implied that Mr. Sumner is Aunt May's brother. Nyle's father abandoned his wife and daughter at Gran and Gramp's farm after Mrs. Sumner became fatally ill with an unspecified cancer; Nyle was six years old at the time. His reason for abandoning his family is stated as, "he loved [Mrs. Sumner] too much to watch her die." Nyle thinks her father must not have cared much for Nyle herself, since he did not stay for her.
- Ezra Trent – Son of Mrs. Miriam Trent and Mr. Trent, he is fifteen years old when he is introduced in the novel. Suffering from acute radiation syndrome, Ezra and his mother are relocated to Gran's farm in November as refugees from the nuclear accident. Ezra stays in the back bedroom, and his imminent death seems likely at first, but he slowly begins to recover. He briefly becomes well enough to attend school with Nyle, before succumbing to leukemia in the spring. His initial illness, recovery, and eventual death markedly changes Nyle, who is forced to confront her feelings on love, friendship, and death through her experiences with Ezra.
- Miriam Trent – Ezra's mother, the widow of Mr. Trent; Mr. Trent, a "bigshot" at the Cookshire nuclear plant, died of severe radiation poisoning five days before the Trents came to stay with Nyle and Gran. Mrs. Trent is Jewish, her parents both survivors of the Holocaust. Mrs. Trent's parents have never met Ezra, as they disapproved of her love of and marriage to Mr. Trent, who was not Jewish. Mrs. Trent suffered from mild radiation sickness, but recovers while living at the farm.
- Muncie Harris – Nyle's best friend. Muncie has dwarfism and is frequently ostracized by her peers, but she and Nyle developed a close friendship. The Harrises rent their home from Gran, and live nearby to the farm.
- Aunt May and Uncle Lemmy – Nyle's aunt and uncle, who had a large dairy farm until the accident irradiated the farmland and animals. They have seven children, Nyle's cousins, including Lou and Maxine who are closest in age to Nyle. Their youngest child, Bethany, is seriously ill with radiation poisoning. Aunt May, Uncle Lemmy, and Bethany move to Gran's farm so that Bethany can recover in the back bedroom after Ezra and Mrs. Trent have left.
- Ripley Powers – a local fifteen-year old boy who bullies Muncie and Nyle, and later Ezra. His dog, Tyrus, was known for running loose and killing local livestock until the dog's death from radiation poisoning.
- Bayley – Nyle's black-and-white cat.
- Caleb – The farm's herding dog, a black-and-white Border Collie.
- Shep – A Great Pyrenees puppy Nyle and Gran got for Ezra; "Shep" is also the nickname Ezra first gave Nyle. He is trained as a guard dog for the farm since the previous guard dog, Birch, died prior to the beginning of the novel.

== Publication details ==
- Hesse, Karen (1994). Phoenix Rising. New York: Henry Holt and Company, LLC. ISBN 978-0-8050-3108-9.
