= Jennifer Ikeda =

American actress

Jennifer Ikeda is an actress, author, and audiobook narrator best known for playing Lily in the 2015 drama film Advantageous and Ann in the 2017 action comedy film Killing Hasselhoff. She also starred in the American procedural drama series Elementary in the role of Laura Lyons, and Juliet Chang in the crime drama series Blindspot. She also portrayed herself in the 2011 movie Portraits in Dramatic Time.

== Biography ==
Ikeda is a drama graduate of The Juilliard School. She has won Audie Awards twice, and has narrated dozens of audiobooks, the most popular of which are The Cure for Dreaming, A Discovery of Witches, Shadow of Night, A Court of Mist and Fury, and The Book of Life.

Audiobook Narrator Credits:

- A Court of Thorns and Roses
- A Court of Mist and Fury
- A Discovery of Witches
- Diamond Willow
