= Killing Hasselhoff =

- Theatrical release poster
- Directed by: Darren Grant
- Written by: Peter Hoare
- Produced by: Ashok Amritraj; Michele Berk; Abhishek Devalla; David Hasselhoff; Patrick Hughes; Michael J. Luisi; Warren Zide
- Starring: Ken Jeong; David Hasselhoff; Jim Jeffries; Colton Dunn; Dan Bakkedahl; Ron Funches; Jennifer Ikeda; Rhys Darby
- Cinematography: Joseph White
- Edited by: Ryan Folsey
- Music by: Nathan Whitehead
- Production companies: WWE Studios; Lotus Pictures; Hyde Park Entertainment; Image Nation Abu Dhabi; Intellectual Artists Management; Primary Wave Entertainment
- Distributed by: Universal Pictures Home Entertainment
- Release date: August 29, 2017
- Running time: 80 minutes
- Country: United States
- Language: English

Killing Hasselhoff is a 2017 American action comedy film directed by Darren Grant and starring Ken Jeong and David Hasselhoff. The film was released on DVD and digital platforms on August 29, 2017.

== Plot ==
A man, who is down on his luck, attempts to win a celebrity death pool by trying to kill David Hasselhoff. The prize is half a million dollars, which he can use to pay off a loan shark and get his life back on track.

== Cast ==
- Ken Jeong as Chris
- Jim Jefferies as Tommy
- Colton Dunn as Redix
- David Hasselhoff as The Hoff
- Dan Bakkedahl as Nick
- Ron Funches as Bill Sigliano
- Jennifer Ikeda as Ann
- Rhys Darby as Fish
- Victor Turpin as Sebastian
- Jon Lovitz as Barry
- Master P as Del Toro
- Will Sasso as Wasserstein
- Flula Borg as Alcee
- Carlos Pena Jr. as Pedro
- Michael Winslow as himself
- Justin Bieber as himself
- Rick Fox as himself
- Kid Cudi as himself
- Tony Rock as himself
- Mel B as herself
- Howie Mandel as himself
- Gena Lee Nolin as herself
- Patrick Monahan as himself

== Production ==
Writer Peter Hoare was unhappy with the way the script was rewritten during production. He told Script Magazine, “Little by little, what I saw was the movie changed into something that was so different than the movie I originally wrote, and that David read, so many years before. Long story short, it came out on DVD, but man, it could have been really, really funny.”
