= Make Lemonade =

1993 verse novel by Virginia Euwer Wolff

- First edition cover
- Author: Virginia Euwer Wolff
- Publisher: Henry Holt and Company
- Publication date: 1993
- ISBN: 978-0-8050-2228-5

Make Lemonade is a verse novel for young adults, written by Virginia Euwer Wolff and originally published in 1993 by Henry Holt and Company. It is the first book in a trilogy series consisting of Make Lemonade, True Believer (the second installment), and This Full House (the third installment). These novels are characterized by their free verse style. The trilogy is unified by its protagonist LaVaughn, a fourteen-year-old girl who recounts her experiences and perspective from first-person point of view. All three books have been published as audiobooks read by Heather Alicia Simms.

Make Lemonade has been translated into Danish, Dutch, German, Italian, Japanese, Korean, and Spanish.

== Plot ==
LaVaughn notices a flyer for a babysitting job for two kids, Jeremy and Jilly. She takes the number and applies for the job. LaVaughn is greeted by Jolly, who is her new employer. She meets the kids and connects with them. In that time, LaVaughn plants some lemon seeds that Jeremy would sit in front of for some time each day. Later at her house, she asks her mom if she can take the job. Reluctantly, she accepts and gives her permission.

Jolly shows up late one day with lacerations on her face. LaVaughn has her mom come to help with Jolly, and her mom tells Jolly she needs to take hold of her life and criticizes Jolly. A few weeks later, Jolly comes home and announces that she was fired. LaVaughn learns that it was because Jolly's boss was sexually abusing her and Jolly stabbed his hand with a pencil to make him stop. The boss fired her for the act. Jolly tries several times to file reports of sexual abuse to administration, but they ignore her calls and complaints. Jolly tries unsuccessfully to get a new job and rejects LaVaughn's suggestion that she go back to school so that she can get better jobs, for fear that her children might get taken away from her.

Meanwhile, the lemon seeds that LaVaughn planted with Jeremy never grew, so she decides to plant some more and hopes that they will grow this time around.

LaVaughn contacts people at her school and finds out that if Jolly can go back to school, she can get free daycare for the kids. Finally, after talking to the school employees herself, Jolly reluctantly joins the program. Jolly's school program notes Jolly's problems with time management, however, and LaVaughn returns to babysit for Jolly again for an hour every day, like before.

In an attempt to get some money, Jolly decides that she will write a letter to a billionaire who sometimes helps people who write to him. LaVaughn thinks that it is a crazy idea, but helps Jolly write the letter. LaVaughn notices an improvement in Jolly's self-esteem around this time.

Soon afterward, LaVaughn brings in new lemon seeds, because the second round of seeds did not grow either.

Later, Jolly gets a letter back from the billionaire with a $5 check to treat her kids but also a promise of some more money if she gives proof of her GED.

One afternoon, LaVaughn and Jolly are both watching the kids when Jilly chokes on a toy. Jolly does CPR on Jilly, which was something that she had been studying in her classes recently. Jilly is taken to the hospital. LaVaughn and Jeremy explain to LaVaughn's mom what happened, and she begrudgingly praises Jolly for the first time.

== Reception and themes ==
Make Lemonade generated starred reviews from Publishers Weekly and Booklist and received several awards. Although praised by many, the novel also raised concerns from organizations, such as schools in New York, that some of the content is inappropriate for middle-school students. Some of these controversial topics include teenage pregnancy and discussion of sexual harassment.

The book was dedicated "for young mothers", which many people consider representative of the book's content and central focus on Jolly, the teenaged mother of two children. The novel discusses her encounters and struggles with topics such as poverty, unemployment, teenage pregnancy, parenting, sexual harassment, education, drugs, and isolation from family. The author stated in an interview with The Horn Book Magazine that she kept the format of the novel in free verse partly "...because Make Lemonade is dedicated to young mothers. I wanted young girls in Jolly’s situation, maybe pregnant or with babies, and maybe going back to school, to be able to say, 'I read two chapters!'"

Many people have also speculated on the ethnicity of the characters, although the author denied any intended character ethnicities and claimed that she was "very careful of not having them be any race, any particular ethnicity".

== Awards and honors ==
- American Library Association (ALA) Best Book for Young Adults
- American Library Association (ALA) Notable Children's Book
- Bank Street Child Study Book Award, 1993
- Best Kids' Book of 1993, 1993
- Best YA Novels of All Time, English Journal, November 2005
- Booklist Top of the List winner
- Bulletin for the Center for Children's Books Blue Ribbon Book, 1993
- Children's Book of Distinction, 1994
- Golden Kite Award, 1994
- Iowa Teen Award nominee, 1996-1997
- Michigan Library Association Thumbs Up! Award for YA Fiction, 1994
- Oregon Book Award for Young Readers, 1993
- Parent's Choice Book Award, 1993
- Preiselbar Award, 2000
- School Library Journal Best Book of the Year, 1993
- Top of the List, 1993
- YALSA Best Book for Young Adults, 1994
- YALSA Popular Paperback for Young Adults, 2002
