= Steven Herrick =

Australian poet and author (born 1958)

- Born: 1958 (age 67–68); Brisbane, Queensland, Australia
- Occupations: Poet and author
- Writing career
- Notable awards: 2005 New South Wales Premier's Literary Awards — Ethel Turner Prize for Young People's Literature, winner

Steven Herrick (born in Brisbane, 1958) is an Australian poet and author. Herrick has published twenty-six books for adults, young adults and children. He is widely regarded as a pioneer of verse-novels for children and young adults.

Herrick was born the youngest of seven children. His first published poem, written at age eighteen, was called Love is like a gobstopper. He left school in year 10. He studied poetry at university, and gained his B.A. from the University of Queensland in 1982.

In 1984, he moved to Sydney and spent time performing his poems in the pubs and clubs of the inner-city, often as a support act for local bands. Soon after he was approached by Mighty Boy Records to record an independent record of his poetry, titled 'The Esoteric Herrick'. This record gained airplay on alternate music radio stations and was quickly followed by the release of his second record, 'The Herrick Manifesto.'

In 1994, he moved with his wife and children to his current home in the Blue Mountains and began writing books for children and young adults.

His books have won the NSW Premier's Literary Awards in 2000 and 2005 and have been on the Children's Book Council of Australia "Children's Book of the Year Awards" shortlist multiple times, including 1997 - "Love, Ghosts and Nose Hair"; 1999 - "A Place like This"; 2001 - "The Simple Gift"; 2003 - "Tom Jones Saves the World"; 2013 - "Pookie Aleera is not my boyfriend"; 2015 - "Bleakboy and Hunter Stand out in the Rain"; 2019 - "The Bogan Mondrian"; 2022 - “How to Repaint a Life”, and have been recognised as an Honour Book in 2004 - "Do-wrong Ron" and 2005 - "By the River".

His books for children and young adults have been translated into numerous languages. In 2019, the German translation of "by the river" won both the German Catholic Book of the Year Award and the German Youth Literature Award at the Frankfurt Book Fair.

He regularly visits schools throughout Australia where he talks with students about poetry and soccer, which he has loved since childhood. He has also performed in the United Kingdom, USA, Singapore, Canada, Croatia, Spain, Vietnam, Germany, The Netherlands and the Czech Republic.

He has also written nine travel books based on his cycling adventures throughout Europe, including Baguettes and Bicycles. His other travel books include Cycling North, tracing a 4000-kilometre bicycle journey from Marseille, France to Bergen, Norway, and Cycling South, following his trek from the Highlands of Scotland to the Islands of the Mediterranean (Sardinia and Corsica). Herrick also writes cycling articles for The Guardian newspaper (Australia).

He lives in Katoomba in the Blue Mountains with his wife, Cathie. They have two adult sons named Jack and Joe.

== Bibliography ==
Herrick's books include fiction novels, poetry collections, and novels in verse. Titles include:

- How to Repaint a Life (University of Queensland Press, 2021) ISBN 978-0-7022-6315-6
- Zoe, Max and the Bicycle Bus (University of Queensland Press, 2020) ISBN 978-0-7022-6300-2
- The Bogan Mondrian (University of Queensland Press, 2018) ISBN 978-0-7022-6110-7
- Another Night in Mullet Town (University of Queensland Press, 2016) ISBN 978-0-7022-5643-1
- Bleakboy and Hunter Stand Out in the Rain (University of Queensland Press, 2014) ISBN 978-0-7022-5267-9
- Pookie Aleera Is Not My Boyfriend (University of Queensland Press, 2012) ISBN 978-0-7022-4851-1
- Black Painted Fingernails (Allen & Unwin, 2011) ISBN 978-1-74237-459-8
- Slice: Juicy Moments from My Impossible Life (Random House, 2010) ISBN 978-1-86471-603-0
- Untangling Spaghetti (University of Queensland Press, 2009) ISBN 978-0-7022-3730-0
- Rhyming Boy (University of Queensland Press, 2008) ISBN 978-0-7022-3673-0
- Cold Skin (Allen & Unwin, 2007) ISBN 978-1-74175-129-1
- Lonesome Howl (Allen & Unwin, 2006) ISBN 978-1-74114-656-1
- Naked Bunyip Dancing (Allen & Unwin, 2005) ISBN 978-1-74114-655-4
- By the River (Allen & Unwin, 2004) ISBN 978-1-74114-357-7
- Do-Wrong Ron (Allen & Unwin, 2003) ISBN 978-1-86508-661-3
- Tom Jones Saves the World (University of Queensland Press, 2002) ISBN 978-0-7022-3336-4
- Love Poems and Leg Spinners (University of Queensland Press, 2001) ISBN 978-0-7022-3317-3
- The Simple Gift (University of Queensland Press, 2000) ISBN 978-0-7022-3133-9
- The Spangled Drongo (University of Queensland Press, 1999) ISBN 978-0-7022-3095-0
- A Place Like This (University of Queensland Press, 1998) ISBN 978-0-7022-2984-8
- Poetry to the Rescue (University of Queensland Press, 1998) ISBN 978-0-7022-3318-0
- My Life, My Love, My Lasagne (University of Queensland Press, 1997) ISBN 978-0-7022-3326-5
- Love, Ghosts and Nose Hair (University of Queensland Press, 1996) ISBN 978-0-7022-2878-0
- The Sound of Chopping (Five Islands Press, 1994) ISBN 978-1-875604-17-3
- Water Bombs (University of Queensland Press, 1992) ISBN 978-1-875491-07-0
- Caboolture (Five Islands Press, 1990) ISBN 978-0-9587972-8-3

== Awards ==
- 2000 New South Wales Premier's Literary Awards – Patricia Wrightson Prize for Children's Literature winner, for The Spangled Drongo
- 2005 Speech Pathology Australia Book of the Year Awards — Best Speech and/or Sound Awareness Book, winner for Do-Wrong Ron
- 2005 New South Wales Premier's Literary Awards – Ethel Turner Prize for Young People's Literature winner, for By the River
- 2005 Speech Pathology Australia Book of the Year Awards — Best Language Development Book for Upper Primary Children, winner for By the River
- 2006 Speech Pathology Australia Book of the Year Awards — Best Language Development Book for Upper Primary Children, winner for Naked Bunyip Dancing
- 2012 Western Australian Premier's Book Awards — Premier's Prize for Writing for Children, joint winner for Pookie Aleera Is Not My Boyfriend
