= Ellen Hopkins =

American writer

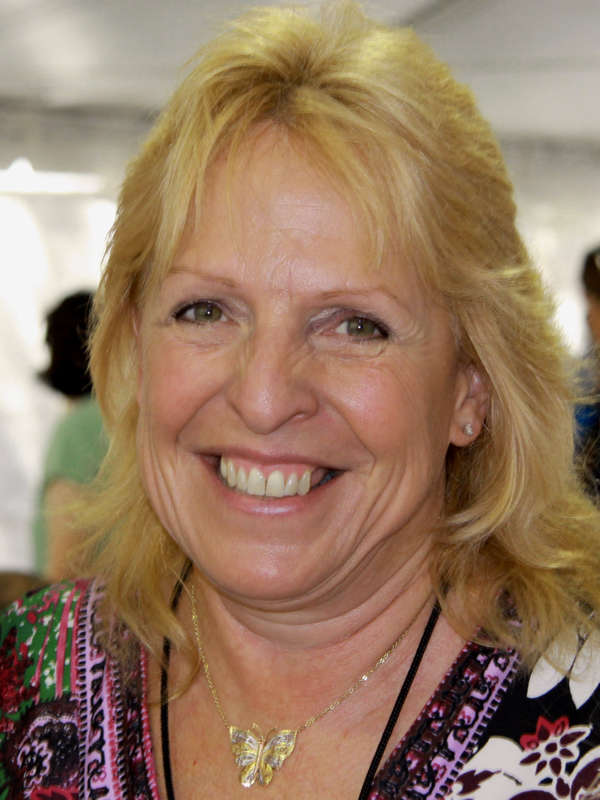
- Hopkins at the 2011 Texas Book Festival
- Born: March 26, 1955 (age 71); Long Beach, California, U.S.
- Education: Santa Ynez Valley Union High School; Crafton Hills College; University of California, Santa Barbara
- Occupations: Novelist, poet
- Spouse: John Hopkins
- Writing career
- Years active: 1990–present
- Genre: Young adult/Adult
- Website: www.ellenhopkinsbooks.com

Ellen Louise Hopkins (born March 26, 1955) is a novelist who has published several New York Times bestselling novels that are popular among the teenage and young adult audience.

== Personal life ==
Hopkins was adopted by Albert and Valeria Wagner when they were 72 and 42 respectively. Her first poem was published in the Palm Springs Desert Sun when she was nine. Hopkins graduated from a high school in the Santa Ynez Valley, then studied journalism at Crafton Hills College and the University of California, Santa Barbara.

Hopkins dropped out of university before graduation to start a family and business. She had two children, Jason and Cristal. When her marriage failed, she sold her business and began freelance work. Following her divorce, she had a daughter, Kelly, with a man she considered to be a 'rebound'. He was abusive and kidnapped Kelly, keeping her in secrecy for three years. Kelly was later found by her paternal great-grandmother. Around 1991, she married John Hopkins, her current husband. They also adopted their daughter Cristal's son, Orion. In 1990, Hopkins and her family moved to northern Nevada.

While in Nevada, she decided to write for a living. She started out freelancing newspaper and magazine articles, then moved from there into children's nonfiction. Hopkins believes most of her writing talent originates from her own talent and also from her adoptive mother. She also considers her fifth-grade teacher the first person to encourage her to become a professional writer.

Later in life, Hopkins found her biological mother, Toni Chandler, who was also a writer and poet.

== Education ==
- Santa Ynez Valley Union High School (graduated 1973)
- Crafton Hills College, UCSB
- Institute of Children's Literature

=== Writers groups ===
- 1995-1997 WNCC Lone Mountain Writers Group
- 1997-1999 Breakaway Writers Group
- 1998–present Society of Children's Book Writers and Illustrators; served as regional adviser for the Nevada chapter for ten years and currently sits on the Board of Advisers.
- 1999-2005 Unnamed Writers; served on the board, 2005
- 2001-2002 Chairman of the Board, New Writers of the Purple Sage
- 2002–present Ash Canyon Poets

== Career ==
Hopkins began her writing career in 1990. She started with nonfiction books for children, including Air Devils and Orcas: High Seas Supermen.

Hopkins has since written several verse novels exposing teenage struggles such as drug addiction, mental illness, and prostitution, including Crank, Burned, Impulse, Identical, Glass, Tricks, Tilt, and Fallout. Glass is the sequel to Crank, and Fallout, the third and final book in the series, was released on September 14, 2010. Perfect was released on September 13, 2011, and is a companion novel to Impulse. Tilt, was released September 11, 2012, and is a companion from the point of view of the teens mentioned in Triangles. Hopkins felt they needed their own story after the release of Triangles.

Her second adult novel, Collateral, came out in the fall of 2012. In 2013, she released the sequel to her bestselling book Burned titled Smoke. Rumble released August 2014, is about a boy questioning his faith after his brother commits suicide. In 2015, she released Love Lies Beneath, about a woman who falls in love with a sociopath, and Traffick , a sequel to her bestseller Tricks. People Kill People was released in September 2018.

In 2006, Hopkins was recognized with a Silver Pen Award (for emerging writers) from the Nevada Writers Hall of Fame. She was inducted as a full member into the Nevada Writers Hall of Fame in 2015.

=== Inspiration ===
Hopkins's primary inspiration for her first novels (i.e., the Crank series) comes from her eldest daughter, who "was addicted to crystal methamphetamine and spent two years in prison." In 2007, her daughter had been sober for five years. In an interview discussing Glass and Crank, Hopkins said, "I really want both books to be an honest look at the depth and the nature of this addiction. It's not that easy to shake, and I really wanted that to be made very clear." On December 31, 2014, Hopkins stated in her online journal that, “My relationship with my daughter, long tenuous, disintegrated completely.” They have since been on speaking terms.

Ellen's daughter, Cristal, who is the inspiration for the character Kristina Snow in the Crank series, is now married and is a realtor. She has a YouTube channel under the name "Cristal Thetford", where she openly addresses her experiences with drug addiction.

Some of the themes discussed in Identical are inspired by friends of Hopkins who have suffered sexual abuse.

=== Censorship ===
Hopkins's books have regularly been included in the American Library Association's lists of the most frequently banned and challenged books in the United States. Four of her novels were included in the list of the top 100 banned and challenged novels between 2010 and 2019: Crank (38th), Burned (83rd), Glass (86th), and Tricks (98th). In 2010, Crank made the top ten list.

In 2022, five of Hopkins's novels (Crank, Fallout, Impulse, People Kill People, and Tilt) were listed among 52 books banned by the Alpine School District following the implementation of Utah law H.B. 374, “Sensitive Materials In Schools." Forty-two percent of removed books “feature LBGTQ+ characters and or themes.” Many of the books were removed because they were considered to contain pornographic material according to the new law, which defines porn using the following criteria:

- "The average person" would find that the material, on the whole, "appeals to prurient interest in sex"
- The material "is patently offensive in the description or depiction of nudity, sexual conduct, sexual excitement, sadomasochistic abuse, or excretion"
- The material, on the whole, "does not have serious literary, artistic, political or scientific value."

== Publications ==
- (YA) = Young Adult
- (A) = Adult

=== Crank trilogy ===
- Crank (2004) (YA)
- Glass (2007) (YA)
- Fallout (2010) (YA)

=== Burned series ===
- Burned (2006) (YA)
- Smoke (2013) (YA)

=== Impulse series ===
- Impulse (2007) (YA)
- Perfect (2011) (YA)

=== Triangles and Tilt (YA Companion) ===
- Triangles (2011) (A)
- Tilt (2012) (YA) [companion novel]

=== Tricks series ===
- Tricks (2009) (YA)
- Traffick (Fall 2015) (YA)

=== Love Lies Beneath novels ===
- Love Lies Beneath (2015) (A)
- A Sin Such as This (2018) (A)

=== Other novels ===
- Identical (2008) (YA)
- Collateral (2012) (A)
- Rumble (2014) (YA)
- The You I've Never Known (January 2017) (YA)
- People Kill People (2018) (YA)
- Closer to Nowhere (2020)
- What About Will (2021) (YA)
- Sync (2024) (YA)
