= Keesha's House =

2003 novel by Helen Frost

- First edition
- Author: Helen Frost
- Language: English
- Genre: Young adult, poetry
- Publisher: Farrar, Straus and Giroux
- Publication date: April 2, 2003
- Media type: Print
- Pages: 128 pages
- ISBN: 0374340641

Keesha's House is a 2003 award-winning debut young adult verse novel by American author Helen Frost. The book's story is told through multiple poems and concerns a group of teenagers that are all drawn to the house of the title character Keesha due to serious issues in their personal lives.

== Synopsis ==
The book follows several teenagers that have come to Keesha's house in search of a safe haven. Each teen has something that is going wrong in their life. Young couple Stephie and Jason are having troubles due to her teen pregnancy, with Jason feeling pressure due to him feeling like he has to choose between a potential sports career and his responsibilities. Dontay and Carmen both have had interactions with the legal system. Carmen must deal with a DUI charge while Dontay is shuffled through the foster care system due to his parents being in prison. Meanwhile, Harris and Katie are both experiencing trouble with their family members. Harris has come out to his father, only to be disowned. Katie can't understand why her mother remains with her abusive stepfather and tries to escape her situation by becoming a workaholic in every aspect of her life.

== Reception ==
Initial critical reception for Keesha's House has been predominantly positive. Booklist and the School Library Journal have both praised the audiobook adaptation's narration, with the School Library journal commenting that it was a "perfect vehicle for teaching high school poetry".

=== Awards ===
- Bank Street Best Children's Book of the Year, 2004
- Michael L. Printz Honor Award, 2004
- YALSA's "Selected Videos, DVDs, and Audiobooks For Young Adults", 2005

== Stage adaptation ==
In 2004 the book was adapted into a stage play by Fort Wayne's Youtheatre.
