= View from Mount Diablo =

Verse novel by Ralph Thompson

View from Mount Diablo is a verse novel by Ralph Thompson (b. 1928), which won the Jamaican National Literary Award in manuscript in 2001, and was published by Peepal Tree Press in 2003. An annotated edition with a number of small textual corrections appeared in both material and digital formats in 2009.

== Summary ==
The poem narrates the life of a white Jamaican, Adam Cole, born sometime in the 1930s and so growing up during World War II, during which his uncle Johann, of German extraction, is interned in the same camp as future national leader Alexander Bustamante. Adam has a close friend, Nathan, a poor black boy who is a gardener and groom, but education forces them apart. After taking a degree at Oxford University in the 1950s Adam returns to Jamaica to work as a journalist on the Daily Tribune (a version of The Daily Gleaner) and marries a Jamaican Chinese, Amber Lee. They have a daughter, Chantal, but when she is 15 (sometime in the early 1970s) she is raped in the grounds of her school, and the marriage subsequently breaks up, Amber and Chantal emigrating to Canada while Adam stays in Kingston and becomes ever more committed to crusading journalism.

A parallel historical narrative charts Jamaica's progress from Crown Colony to full independence, and its subsequent descent into serious civil violence. Corruption, veniality, sectarianism, and other elements forming what Rastafarians call the 'politricks' of Jamaica are noted, but the principal force for evil is squarely diagnosed as the international cocaine trade, in its facilitation of material corruption, in the morally deadening toleration of violence it promotes, and in the appalling opportunity cost it imposes on national infrastructure, education, and business. From this history a series of vignettes emerge, of profits turned, of a needless death on the operating table caused by a substandard generator, of extrajudicial killing by a special police squad, and of events in the life of a principal cocaine baron—Adam's sometime friend, Nathan.

Eventually an enforcer named Blaka, spurred by religious conversion, becomes an informer for Adam, whose journalism begins to expose too many secrets of the 'runnings', or details of shipments and transactions. Adam also hears the dying confession of a white middleman, Tony 'the Frog' Blake, who knows of Nathan's involvement, and so becomes an unacceptable threat to the cocaine trader—and as Blaka observes, "Blood / cheaper than drugs" (946-7). Blaka is found murdered on Mount Diablo (a central Jamaican height), "stuffed in a handcart, head severed, torso turned / to the mountain, blank eyes staring down the valley [...] the word Judas, warning intaglio, / carved with a switchblade into the transom" (955-9); another body is floating in the harbour; and Adam himself is confronted at home, and after a brief struggle shot dead, by Nathan.

Formally, View from Mount Diablo uses a tragic (i.e. failed, abortive) Bildungsroman structure to support a state-of-the-nation novel; additional topoi and tropes concerning the drug trades and policing are drawn both from real Jamaican life and from popular cinematic and print fictions of crime.

Technically, the verse novel is written in loosely heroic single-rhymed quatrains—i.e. the metre consistently approximates iambic pentameter, and the four-line stanzas have the rhyme scheme ABCB. It is structured in a prologue and 12 chapters, and has 1,048 lines.

== The treatment of time and autobiography ==
Given Adam's apparent dates of birth and marriage, and Chantal's age when raped, it is easy to suppose View from Mount Diablo to cover Jamaican history from the 1930s-70s. Similarly, given that Adam is a white Jamaican protagonist created by a white Jamaican author, it is easy to suppose him autobiographical. But neither supposition is adequately true.

Jamaican history from the 1930s-70s certainly is covered, but while those ought to be the limiting dates a series of devices and observations blurs the issue, and forces time to be more advanced than it chronologically should be. In gross, the scale of the cocaine trade reported and the annual murder-rates implicit in it point to a date in at least the later 1980s, while in fine, references to computerisation in journalism and the use of a personal photo as a screensaver implies a date at least in the 1990s. What Thompson in effect manages is to keep the first half of his story in historical time, but thereafter to subsume into the violence and social problems of the 1970s all later, generically similar events of the 1980s-2000s, so that in the second half of the story time is foreshortened, and the verse novel made much wider-reaching as a contemporary national diagnosis than it may at first seem.

In keeping, while Adam's childhood and racial identity are similar to Thompson's, his Oxford degree, profession of journalism, experience of familial tragedy, and murder in early middle-age progressively distance him from his creator.

== Origins and early reception ==
Thompson has said that a significant factor in his decision to write View from Mount Diablo was pressurising encouragement from Nobel Laureate Derek Walcott, a longstanding personal friend:

On one of his visits to Jamaica Derek Walcott said to me, "Thompson, every time I come to Jamaica I feel your anger about the state of politics in Jamaica and the corruption contaminating the society. Why don't you reflect this indignation in your next collection[?]" [...] The first step was to recognize that the anger which Walcott recognized needed to be regulated by a relatively strict poetic form or it would turn into a scream.

The poem won the Jamaican National Literary Award in manuscript in 2001; the Award Committee that year was chaired by David Williams, Senior Lecturer in the Department of Literatures in English at the University of the West Indies–Mona, where the poem has subsequently been taught. Initial sales in Jamaica amounted to 300+ copies (average sale of a paperback being c.70).

It was serialised in The Gleaner (Kingston) and published in paperback by Peepal Tree Press in 2003 to strongly positive and appreciative reviews; two such are reproduced in the second, annotated edition (2009), and half-a-dozen are linked through the Peepal Tree website.

== Editions ==
View from Mount Diablo was first published by Peepal Tree Press in 2003 (ISBN 1-900715-81-3).

View from Mount Diablo: An annotated edition, edited by John Lennard, was published simultaneously in paperback by Peepal Tree , and digitally by Humanities-Ebooks , in 2009. (ISBN 978-1-84523-144-6 [paperback ed.]; ISBN 978-1-84760-093-6 [digital ed.])
