= Letters from Rifka =

1992 children's novel by Karen Hesse

- First edition
- Author: Karen Hesse
- Subject: This book is about a Jewish girl named Rifka who escapes Russia after being threatened by the government. She makes her way to America to seek a new beginning.
- Genre: Children's historical novel, epistolary novel
- Publisher: Henry Holt & Co. (Macmillan)
- Publication date: July 15, 1992
- Publication place: Russia
- Media type: Print
- Pages: 148 pp
- ISBN: 9780805019643
- OCLC: 25205387
- LC Class: PZ7.H4364 Le 1992

Letters From Rifka is a children's historical novel by Karen Hesse, published by Holt in 1992. The novel is based on the life of Hesse's great-aunt Lucille Avrutin. With an intended young adult audience, the book aims to inform and validate. Letters from Rifka details a Jewish family's emigration from Russia in 1919, to Belgium and ultimately to the U.S. The protagonist's name, Rifka, is the East European Jewish version of Rebecca (Rivká in Modern Israeli Hebrew).

Karen Hesse earned several awards for Letters from Rifka, including the Sydney Taylor Book Award, the National Jewish Book Award, and the Phoenix Award.

== Plot ==
During the Russian Civil War of 1919, Rifka Nebrot and her family flee Russia because the country's army is after one of her brothers, Nathan, for deserting his service duties. The penalty for his crime is death for the entire family. Three of her older brothers – Isaac, Asher, and Reuben – are already in the United States, and Rifka, her other two brothers, Nathan and Saul, and their parents seek to be reunited with them.

Rifka tells her story in a series of letters she writes to a cousin named Tovah, who remains behind in Russia. The letters are written in the blank spaces of an edition of Pushkin's poetry that once belonged to Tovah. Each letter includes the date, Rifka's location, and a unique sign-off, such as “Pray for me, please, Rifka.” Along their way to America, the family faces many obstacles, including Rifka's mother, father, and brother Saul falling ill with typhus. Cruel officials made the expedition more challenging, and the family also suffered from hunger and theft. Rifka contracts ringworm, a skin disease that forced her to stay behind in Belgium while her family leaves for America. In Belgium, Jewish people are treated with kindness, and a caring doctor named Dr. Marinus helps Rifka recover from her illness. Her improved health allows her to leave Belgium in pursuit of reuniting with her family. She travels to America on a large ship, where she befriends a sailor named Pieter. The two develop a deep connection, but a storm occurs during the voyage and kills Pieter. Upon learning of his death, Rifka weeps not only out of mourning for this loss, but for all that she has had to endure.

Finally, the ship arrives at Ellis Island, but instead of getting to see her family, Rifka is prohibited from entering America because her ringworm has returned. Ringworm was common on Ellis Island, so it forced Rifka to be detained at a hospital. While being treated, she finds she has a talent for nursing others to health. Rifka also meets Ilya, another child who immigrated from Russia. Ilya is shy and judged by others because he is frail and barely eats. Once Rifka and Ilya begin to develop a friendship, she discovers that he is very smart. She also helps Ilya mend his relationship with his uncle by explaining that his uncle is not cruel and wants Ilya to come to America out of love. After practicing with encouragement from Rifka, Ilya demonstrates his English skills by reading from Rifka's Pushkin poetry book. As a result, he is permitted to enter the United States. Having now recovered from her ringworm, Rifka reads her own writings in English and is also authorized to enter America, where she reconnects with her family.

== Characters ==
- Rifka Nebrot: Narrator and protagonist of the novel who faces many challenges along her journey to America
- Ethel and Beryl Nebrot: Rifka's parents
- Isaac, Asher, and Reuben Nebrot: Rifka's older brothers who moved to America fourteen years ago before the story begins
- Nathan Nebrot: Rifka's brother who deserts his duties for the Russian army
- Saul Nebrot: Rifka's brother with who often teases her
- Uncle Avrum: Rifka's uncle who helps the family escape Russia
- Tovah: Uncle Avrum's daughter who Rifka writes to in the blank spaces of Pushkin's poetry
- Dr. Marinus: Helps Rifka recover from ringworm in Belgium
- Pieter: Sailor who becomes close with Rifka on the ship to America
- Ilya: Young Russian boy whom Rifka meets and with whom she develops a friendship with on Ellis Island
- Mr. Fargate: Decides who on Ellis Island can enter America

== Genre ==
Hesse has written over 20 published books, some of which are illustrated. Her pre-writing process includes conducting research and then developing her characters. She writes her first draft quickly and then reviews her work to contemplate the subject of the book and its characters. Hesse wrote Letters from Rifka for young adult readers, whom she believes look for books "that challenge their intelligence, confirm their beliefs, and console them in their times of turmoil." However, the book's audience is not limited to children. The details of Rifka's immigration from Russia to the US can broadly inform adult readers on the journey taken by thousands during World War I, while children may concentrate on Rifka's journey alone. Key lessons in the book stem from Rifka's experiences dealing with oppression, including, for example, keeping written records.

== Reception ==
Hesse received the Sydney Taylor Book Award from the Association of Jewish Libraries in 1992 in the Middle Grade Category for Letters from Rifka. The book won the 1993 National Jewish Book Award in the Children's Literature category. Hesse and Letters from Rifka were awarded the 2016 Phoenix Award from the Children's Literature Association, which recognizes the best children's book published in the past twenty years that did not receive a major award during its time.

Kirkus Reviews called the novel "an unforgettable picture of immigrant courage, ingenuity, and perseverance." Publishers Weekly wrote "Hesse's vivacious tale colorfully and convincingly refreshes the immigrant experience."
