= Fallout (novel) =

2010 novel by Ellen Hopkins

- First edition (publ. Margaret K. McElderry Books)
- Author: Ellen Hopkins
- Publisher: Margaret K. McElderry Books
- Publication date: September 14, 2010
- ISBN: 978-1-4169-5009-7
- Preceded by: Glass

Fallout is a 2010 young adult novel by author Ellen Hopkins. It follows Glass in the Crank series.

== Summary ==
Hunter, Autumn, and Summer—three of Kristina Snow's five children—live in different homes, with different guardians and different last names. They share only a predisposition for addiction and a host of troubled feelings toward the mother who barely knows them, a mother who has been riding with the monster, crank, for twenty years. Hunter is nineteen, angry, getting by in college with a job at a radio station, a girlfriend he loves in the only way he knows how, and the occasional party. Autumn doesn't know about Hunter, Summer, or their two youngest brothers, Donald and David. She lives with her single aunt and alcoholic grandfather. When her aunt gets married, and the only family she's ever known crumbles, Autumn's compulsive habits lead her to drink. Summer is the youngest of the three. And to her, family is only abuse at the hands of her father's girlfriends and a slew of foster parents. As each searches for real love and true family, they find themselves pulled toward the one person who links them together—Kristina, Bree, mother, addict. But it is in each other, and in themselves, that they find the trust, the courage, the hope to break the cycle.

== Reception ==
Fallout, like Hopkins's other novels, has received both positive reviews and challenges.

Multiple reviewers highlighted the book's style, which Publishers Weekly called "gritty" and "gripping." School Library Journal (SLJ) also complimented the novel's "not-quite poetry" writing style, noting that it was "as solid as ever, though her visual formations get more mystifying and extraneous with each novel." Voice of Youth Advocates (VOYA) praised Hopkins, saying that even though the novel contained the word "fuck" and some sexual description, the "poetry is the perfect vehicle to deliver the festering emotional beating that drug addiction inflicts on families." Kirkus Reviews similarly noted, "The clipped free verse sharply conveys fragmented and dissociated emotions."

Even with all the buzz about Fallout being positive, SLJ noted that "the Venn diagram of Kristina's baby daddies, parents, grandparents, aunts, uncles, and drug buddies is impossible to follow," which may frustrate readers. Regardless of its difficulty, VOYA wrote that it was a quick read—despite its intimidating page length—and impossible to put down.

In 2022, Fallout, along with four of Hopkins's other novels, was listed among 52 books banned by the Alpine School District following the implementation of Utah law H.B. 374, “Sensitive Materials In Schools." Many of the books were removed because they were considered to contain pornographic material according to the new law, which defines porn using the following criteria:

- "The average person" would find that the material, on the whole, "appeals to prurient interest in sex"
- The material "is patently offensive in the description or depiction of nudity, sexual conduct, sexual excitement, sadomasochistic abuse, or excretion"
- The material, on the whole, "does not have serious literary, artistic, political or scientific value."

== Bibliography ==
- Hopkins, Ellen. Fallout. New York, New York: Simon & Schuster Children's Publishing Division, 2010.
