= Glass (novel) =

2007 novel by Ellen Hopkins

- Author: Ellen Hopkins
- Language: English
- Genre: Young adult
- Publisher: Margaret K. McElderry Books
- Publication date: August 21, 2007
- Pages: 688
- ISBN: 978-1-4169-4090-6
- OCLC: 162267175
- LC Class: PZ7.5.H67 Gla 2007
- Preceded by: Crank
- Followed by: Fallout

Glass is the second novel in the verse novel series Crank by Ellen Hopkins, published in hardcover in August 2007 and in softcover on April 7, 2009. The third book of the series, Fallout, was published in 2010. Like the previous novel in the series, Glass has been the subject of controversy, with the book being partially responsible for a public appearance by Hopkins getting cancelled due to parental complaints.

== Plot ==
Kristina thinks that now she has a baby to care for and love, she can quit her addiction. But she finds herself searching for Robyn, her old contact for the "street crank". While at Robyn's house she meets a boy named Trey and starts to crave for people to look like they want or need her. Once she gets home, she begins to work at a 7-Eleven to get the money to buy more crank. The manager there is a porn dealer and offers her a job as a prostitute, but she declines.

After learning that her father is coming to her mother's home to be at the christening of her new baby, Hunter Seth, she begs her mother to let him come and she agrees, on the condition that Kristina has to be the one to tell her older sister Leigh. Once her father comes, he takes her to casinos for her eighteenth birthday party and they snort some lines while there. This causes Kristina to be almost late for Hunter's christening, but she manages to make it on time. Meanwhile, Kristina has started dating Trey and began smoking "glass", which is much more harmful than smoking crank because it is pure meth in rock size quantities. Kristina begins to smoke it every day, becoming skinnier and crashing more often. After crashing one day, her mother kicks her out of the house because she didn't even try to help Hunter, who had rolled himself under a chair and couldn't get out.

Kristina then moves in with Brad, Trey's cousin, while serving as the babysitter of Brad's two young daughters, Devon and LeTreya. She quits working at 7-Eleven by using blackmail and gets a call from Robyn. After finding out that Robyn now works at a "whorehouse", Kristina goes over and is able to sell the girls ice, instead of street crank, which was the only meth they'd had access to. Trey leaves for college and Kristina soon finds herself becoming attracted to Brad. After Trey comes home, she asks him why he hadn't been answering the phone and he responds with that he had been seeing a girl for sex only and that he still loved Kristina. She passes out and finds him gone. This saddens Kristina and she begins to have sex with Brad. When Trey comes home, he finds Kristina sleeping with Brad but instead of getting mad at her, he starts having sex with her while Brad is sleeping. Brad's estranged wife Angela comes back because she wants another try to be together with Brad and her daughters, forcing Brad to kick Kristina out.

Kristina is forced to move into a motel nearby. She is also able to meet the man that gives Brad the crystal meth, Cesar. Once Trey comes back, he confesses to Kristina that the girl he had been sleeping with was Angela until she came back to Brad. He was also forced to move out. She agrees to him moving in and they soon begin to live together. They then move to an apartment together. Kristina asks her mother if she can bring Hunter over to her apartment so Hunter could stay with his mother and stepfather. But Kristina gives him back when she finds Hunter on the ground after having fallen from his high chair. She realizes that her mother was right and that she is not ready to raise Hunter.

Kristina, desperate for some money, steals most of her mother's jewelry and check books. When Kristina gets a court order because her mother thinks that Kristina is an unfit mother, she and Trey decide to make a run for it after a picture of her is put in the newspaper asking for people to turn her in. They soon arrive in California with only a few pairs of clothes, all their meth, and money. They fall asleep in the car after a meal at McDonald's and are awakened by a cop. He asks them to step outside and he finds the half pound of crystal meth. They are arrested and taken to jail. They have to stay the entire weekend and during this time Kristina detoxes from the meth. Because Kristina had a history in Nevada, she and Trey are put behind home state bars. They are offered the chance of ratting on Cesar to shorten their jail sentence to six months which they agree to. During her checkup, Kristina finds out that she is pregnant with Trey's baby and hopes the baby is a girl so that Kristina will be able to love the baby like she should have done with Hunter. She hopes she can stay in touch with Trey and if not she knows she will with Quade. The novel ends with Kristina hoping that things will get better in her life even though she has no reason to be hopeful.

== Reception ==
In 2007, Glass landed on Publishers Weekly's monthly list of the United States's 15 best-selling children's books from September to December.

Reception for the book has been positive, with Kirkus Reviews calling the book "[s]harp and stunning, with a brilliant final page." Publishers Weekly also positively reviewed the book, saying "readers will be amazed at how quickly they work their way through this thick book—and by how much they learn about crystal meth and the toll it takes, both on addicts and their families."

In 2008, the American Library Association included Glass on their list of Quick Picks for Reluctant Young Adult Readers.

=== Controversy ===
Glass is included on the American Library Association's lists of the most frequently banned and challenged books in the United States. Between 2010 and 2019, Glass was the 86th most banned and challenged book in the country.
