= Impulse (Hopkins novel) =

2007 young adult novel by Ellen Hopkins

- Author: Ellen Hopkins
- Language: English
- Genre: Young Adult
- Publisher: Simon & Schuster
- Publication date: 2007
- Publication place: United States
- Pages: 666
- ISBN: 978-1-4169-0356-7 (first edition, hardback)
- OCLC: 67405455
- LC Class: PZ7.H7747 Imp 2007
- Followed by: Perfect

Impulse is a 2007 American young adult novel in verse written by Ellen Hopkins. The novel digs into the lives of three troubled teenagers as they try to work their way out of the hospital by getting through what put them there.

== Plot ==
From the book jacket:

Tony's painful childhood memories can be quelled only through pills. Vanessa has a secret that keeps her coming back to the blade. And Conner seems to have the perfect life on the outside, but his inward battle with his parents, his peers, and himself give him one last choice -- to pull the trigger. These are three lives that would have been cut short if not for the hasty intervention by loved ones. Or fate. Now they are given a second chance at a better life -- but only if they help one another, and if they find the strength to let go of their inner demons. For good.

== Characters ==
Conner Sykes: Conner is the perfect boy. He's handsome, has amazing grades, and is amazing at sports. His family seems like the poster family for the magazines. He and his twin sister, Cara Sykes, (found in Hopkins' book, Perfect) are supposed to be perfect. His sister has achieved that status in the eyes of Conner's parents. Conner finds himself to want what he can not have, like older women. However, when his parents try to force him to live up to their impossible standards, Conner's only choice is to pull the trigger.

Tony Ceccarelli: Tony grew up in the streets mainly. His father abandoned him, while his mother hooks up with anybody. They leave their son all alone to deal with the hardships of life. Tony was sexually abused by one of his mother's boyfriends, and ended up killing the boyfriend. The only person that Tony could trust was his friend and mentor, Phillip, but when Phillip died, Tony's only choice was to swallow the pills.

Vanessa O'Reilly: Vanessa grew up in a broken family. Her father is overseas, her mother does anything to stop the hurt, and on top of it all Vanessa has to worry about watching after her little brother. When her Mother starts going crazy and talking to her "angel", Vanessa's only comfort is to put the blade to her wrist. Eventually, unable to live with her hurt of her now hospitalized mother she tries to make the final cut.

== Reception ==
Reviews for Impulse have been mostly positive, with Publishers Weekly saying that while parts of the book have "an almost unbelievable amount of grittiness... readers will find themselves invested" TeenReads and Kirkus Reviews also gave the book a positive review, with Kirkus calling the book "A fast, jagged, hypnotic read."

Impulse has been challenged due to its sexual content, along with Hopkin's other books.

In 2022, Impulse, along with four of Hopkins's other novels, was listed among 52 books banned by the Alpine School District following the implementation of Utah law H.B. 374, “Sensitive Materials In Schools." Many of the books were removed because they were considered to contain pornographic material according to the new law, which defines porn using the following criteria:

- "The average person" would find that the material, on the whole, "appeals to prurient interest in sex"
- The material "is patently offensive in the description or depiction of nudity, sexual conduct, sexual excitement, sadomasochistic abuse, or excretion"
- The material, on the whole, "does not have serious literary, artistic, political or scientific value."

== Awards ==
- 2008 ALA Quick Picks for Reluctant Young Adult Readers
- 2008 Kentucky Bluegrass Award - nominee
- 2008-2009 Georgia Peach Book Award for Teen Readers - winner
- 2010-2011 Soaring Eagle Book Award - nominee
- 2011 ALA Amazing Audiobooks for Young Adults (for audiobook edition)
- 2013 Abraham Lincoln Illinois High School Book Award - nomination
