= Helen Frost =

American writer and poet (born 1949)

- Born: March 4, 1949 (age 77); South Dakota, U.S.
- Education: Syracuse University
- Occupations: Writer, poet
- Writing career
- Period: 1990–present
- Genres: Young adult, children's fiction
- Notable work: Keesha's House
- Website: helenfrost.net

Helen Marie Frost (born March 4, 1949) is an American writer and poet. She is best known for the young-adult novel Keesha's House, a Michael L. Printz Award honor book in 2004.

Frost was born in South Dakota, the fifth child in a family of ten children. She studied elementary education at Syracuse University. Frost graduated from Syracuse University with a degree in elementary education and a concentration in English, with Philip Booth and W. D. Snodgrass among her teachers. She received her master's degree in English from Indiana University in 1994. Since then, she has become the author of nine novels-in-poems and six picture books. Frost loves to travel. She has traveled to many countries, including Canada, Mexico, Guatemala, Scotland, England, Ireland, China, Japan, Denmark, Germany, and Myanmar, where she was part of a 2016 delegation from Fort Wayne to establish a Friendship City with Mawlamyine. Frost also enjoys hiking, swimming, beadwork, and gardening (especially to welcome birds and monarch butterflies). Since 1991, she has lived in Fort Wayne, Indiana. Before that she moved frequently, living in Scotland, Vermont, Colorado, Alaska, Oregon, and California. In Scotland, she taught at Kilquhanity House School, a progressive boarding school in the tradition of Summerhill. In Alaska, she taught for three years in a one-teacher school in Telida, an Athabascan community of about 25 people, and later taught fifth grade in Ketchikan.

Frost is married to Chad Thompson, a linguist and musician living in Fort Wayne, Indiana. They have two sons, Lloyd and Glen.

Throughout her career, writing and teaching have been interwoven threads. She has published poetry, children's books, anthologies, a play, and a book about teaching writing. She has taught writing at all levels, from pre-school through university and adult education. Frost has also received an Indiana Author Award, a Boston Public Library Literary Lights for Children award, and a National Endowment for the Arts Literature Fellowship in Poetry.

== Books ==
- Skin of a Fish, Bones of a Bird, Ampersand Press, 1993
- Keesha's House, Frances Foster Books, 2003
- Spinning Through the Universe, Frances Foster Books, 2004
- The Braid, Frances Foster Books, 2006
- Diamond Willow, Frances Foster Books, 2008
- Monarch and Milkweed, Atheneum, 2008
- Crossing Stones, Frances Foster Books, 2009
- Hidden, Frances Foster Books, 2011
- Step Gently Out, Candlewick, 2012
- Salt: A Story of Friendship in a Time of War, Farrar, Straus and Giroux, 2013
- Room 214, Original hardcover title: Spinning Through the Universe, Square Fish Books, 2014
- Applesauce Weather, Candlewick, 2016
- Wake Up!, Candlewick, 2017
- When My Sister Started Kissing, Margaret Ferguson Books/FSG/Macmillan, 2017
- Sweep Up the Sun, Candlewick, 2018
- Among a Thousand Fireflies, Candlewick, 2019
- Hello, I'm Here, Candlewick, 2019
- All He Knew, Farrar, Straus and Giroux, 2020

== Awards ==
- Mark Twain Award 2013 for Hidden

https://thelibrary.org/teens/booklists/tpl_nominees_list.cfm?awardid=7&listid=742

- Honor Book, Michael L. Printz Award for Keesha's Story (2004)
- 2011 Indiana Authors Award Regional Winner
- 2022 Indiana Authors Award Middle Grade Winner
