= Song of the Sparrow =

2007 novel by Lisa Ann Sandell

- Author: Lisa Ann Sandell
- Language: English
- Genre: Historical novel, adventure novel, young adult novel
- Publisher: Scholastic Press
- Publication date: 1 May 2007
- Publication place: United States, Australia, and New Zealand
- Media type: Print (hardback & paperback)
- Pages: 416 pp (1st HB)
- ISBN: 0-439-91848-0 (1st HB)
- OCLC: 84902923
- LC Class: PZ7.5.S26 Son 2007
- Followed by: Everyone

Song of the Sparrow is a young adult novel by Lisa Ann Sandell, published in 2007. It is written completely in lyrical form. It is set in Medieval Britain and is a retelling of the story of the Lady of Shalott, a figure from Arthurian legend.

== Plot summary ==
After her mother was murdered by a yellow-haired warrior and her family's house on the island of Shalott was burned to ashes, the 8-year-old Elaine of Ascolat goes to live with her two brothers, Lavain and Tirry, and her father in a British army encampment. She quickly makes friends with many of the camp's occupants, including Arthur, Lancelot, Tristan, and Gawain. Over the years Elaine grows into a beautiful 16-year-old girl and performs all of the menial, household tasks and healing for the camp's soldiers. She also falls in love with her childhood playmate Lancelot, who has become Arthur's right-hand man – a position made even more important after Arthur is forced to assume leadership after the camp's leader Aurelius is poisoned. Many of the other leaders resent Arthur's youth despite his experience and some leave the camp. The night that Arthur is proclaimed leader, Lancelot tells Elaine that he will be sent to win over Lodengrance because he will be needed at Arthur's round table. Arthur is then given his title by the Merlin, Taliesin.

As one of the only two women in the camp (the other being Morgan), Elaine feels somewhat awkward but finds herself flattered when Lancelot tells her that she is a grown woman. The two part ways and soon after Tristan comes up to tell Elaine how he came to be part of the army. The following day Elaine pricks her finger while sewing Tirry's clothes, which she sees as a bad omen. She begins crying and runs from the tent, only to be found and comforted by Morgan in the other woman's tent. Arthur then enters the tent to discuss the planned attack on the Saxons. While he doesn't want to murder anyone, he knows that this must be done to protect the people. A few days later Lancelot returns from his mission with Lodengrance and his beautiful daughter Gwynivere. She is set to be wed to Arthur, which makes Gwynivere unhappy. Lancelot confesses that he is in love with Gwynivere and ultimately considers Elaine a child, which crushes her. To make matters worse Gwynivere treats Elaine cruelly and views herself as superior to Elaine. To get back at her Elaine and Tristan place a frog in Gwynivere's embroidery pouch.

Afterwards Tristan warns Elaine not to follow the men to the Saxons. This warning ends up being in vain as Elaine sets off after the men shortly after their departure. She almost dies crossing a river and is eventually caught by Saxon soldiers. Gwynivere, who had been following Elaine, then appears and the two try to fight off the attackers. They are unsuccessful and they are taken to the Saxon camp as prisoners. Elaine later awakens to the sound of Arthur's army fighting the Saxons. She begins talking to Gwynivere about her worries and her own senselessness. This softens Gwynivere towards Elaine and she admits her own personal worries and jealousy. As the two women spend more time in the camp they overhear the Saxons planning a surprise attack on Arthur, which prompts them to begin planning their escape. They escape by digging their way out of their prison and Elaine decides to serve as a distraction for Gwynivere, who runs off to warn Arthur. Elaine manages to make her way to the river and just before she can climb inside a boat and escape, a Saxon arrow pierces her chest. She then crawls into the boat and floats downstream, where she blacks out and is found by Arthur's men.

As Elaine heals from her wound Arthur decides to move the camp back to Carelon-Usk, a process that is very tiring for Elaine. During this time she receives visits from many, including Lancelot and the two reconcile and rekindle their friendship. Tristan also joins Elaine at one point, where he confesses that he has been jealous of Lancelot because he has been in love with Elaine. This shocks Elaine, who realizes that she's in love with him as well. Upon returning to camp they all gather at the round table where Arthur invites everyone to start a new life and city with him in that very location. Elaine and Tristan, Elaine's family, and many of Elaine's friends stand with their consent to build their new city and establish their freedom in Camelot.

== Characters ==
- Tristan: Tristan is Elaine's friend from the beginning. He is a handsome, clever, cunning warrior, and eventually is Elaine's true love. He is also outgoing and a troublemaker.
- Gwynivere: Gwynivere is Arthur's betrothed, a beautiful, blonde, elegant lady. She attracts the soldiers. At first, her betrothal to Arthur frustrates her since she is in love with Lancelot, but she soon learns that Arthur is her true love. She is prone to jealousy and vanity, but she becomes Elaine's best friend in the end.
- Tirry: Tirry is Elaine's oldest brother. He is very mature and protective of his sister. He has a closer relationship to Elaine than his younger brother Lavain.
- Lancelot: Lancelot is Arthur's best friend and Elaine's former playmate as well as her first love. He tells Elaine she is beautiful, and makes her feel like a woman. He loves Gwynivere but cannot have her. Near the middle of the book, he gets mad at Elaine for no reason and tries to avoid her.
- Gawain: Gawain is described as a big, blond, broad man. He is a bear in size, strength, and heart, and one of Elaine's good friends.
- Merlin: A mysterious, magical hermit who proclaims Arthur dux bellorum. He inspired men, from the war, to rebuild their city.
- Morgan: Arthur's older sister, originally the only other female. She is beautiful, intelligent, graceful, strong-minded, and Elaine's close friend and confidant. She taught Elaine "The Healing Arts"
- Lavain: Lavain is Elaine's second oldest brother. He is "hotheaded and brash" but loves and cares for Elaine. Lavain and Elaine's relationship grows at the end of the book.
- Lodengrance: Lodengrance is Gwynivere's father who offered her hand in marriage to Arthur to aid him in war.
- Arthur: Arthur is on Lancelot's side all the time. He is betrothed to Gwynivere and the leader of the army.
- Elaine: Elaine is the outgoing friend of all the soldiers. She grows into a beautiful girl. She is bold and courageous. Elaine realizes that Lancelot is not her true love but, Tristan is.

== Reception ==
Critical reception for Song of the Sparrow has been positive. The Bulletin of the Center for Children's Books and Kliatt both praised the work, with the Bulletin of the Center for Children's Books writing "Even with the feminine perspective and heavy emphasis on love, the effectively creepy descriptions of the prophesying Merlin, the terse metaphors of blood and war, and the undeniable masculinity of the camp are effective selling points to extend the audience." The Journal of Adolescent & Adult Literacy praised the work for its easy to understand language and recommended it as a companion piece to other works about Arthurian legends. Booklist gave Song of the Sparrow a mixed review, criticizing its "improbable conclusion" and commenting that its "distilled nature does not always allow for the rich detail and development that many readers seek in historical fiction" while also remarking that "the unadorned writing style reflects Sandell's magic-flee interpretations, rooting the characters in the bloody business of pre-Camelot power wrangling."
