= Burned (Hopkins novel) =

2006 book by Ellen Hopkins

- Author: Ellen Hopkins
- Language: English
- Genre: Young adult
- Publisher: Margaret K. McElderry Books
- Publication date: October 23, 2007
- Pages: 544
- ISBN: 978-1-4169-0355-0
- Followed by: Smoke

Burned is a young adult novel written by American author Ellen Hopkins and published in April 2006. Like all of Ellen Hopkin's works, the novel is unusual for its free verse format.

== Plot ==
Pattyn is seventeen years old and is the oldest of seven girls in a Mormon household. Her father is an alcoholic who beats her mother, believing a wife must succumb to her husband's actions. Her mother believes her duty is to have as many children as possible, especially a boy to carry on the family name, just as her husband wishes. Pattyn's mother, however, only conceived seven girls, named after famous generals: (youngest to oldest) Georgia (George Patton), Roberta (Robert E. Lee), Davie (Jefferson Davis), Teddie (Theodore Roosevelt), Ulyssa (Ulysses S. Grant), Jackie (Jack Pershing), and Pattyn (George Patton). It is alluded to that Pattyn deeply disagrees with the strict Mormon lifestyle she's lived throughout her childhood, as well as the expectations that will be imposed on her as a woman by her Mormon community, and wishes to break free and gain the freedom to become her own person with her own take on life. She appears to also resent her alcoholic father, Stephan Von Stratten, and her oppressed and submissive mother, and also having to care for her six younger sisters during their father's moments of alcohol-induced rage.

Pattyn is unable to take the stress going on in her home, and begins to question her role in life, especially through her father's eyes. Eventually, she starts to experiment with dating Derek without her parents' knowledge. This leads to her getting caught drinking with her boyfriend in the desert, ironically, by her drunken father. Derek, her boyfriend, leaves her for another girl who is more experienced, whom Pattyn punches in the face in rage later on in the story. Pattyn becomes openly defiant and talks back to both her parents and pastor, lashing out and releasing all of the built up emotions and objections she has held for her Mormon lifestyle for a number of years. As a punishment, she is sent away to live with her Aunt Jeanette in eastern Nevada, because her mother is finally expecting a son and does not need to deal with the stress that Pattyn creates.

While Pattyn stays with her Aunt Jeanette, who tells Pattyn to call her "Aunt J", she finds love from her aunt and a boy named Ethan, who studies at UC Davis and is described by Pattyn as "beautiful." Ethan's father, Kevin, was once Aunt J's high school sweetheart; but one day, a deputy pulls them over and when he gets out, Pattyn's father gets out along with the deputy. Pattyn's father savagely beats Kevin and threatens to kill him if their relationship should continue; the reason is that Kevin is not a Mormon.

During the time Pattyn lives with her aunt, she learns how to love and how to be self-confident, and finds out that there is more to life than just religion, which is a belief she had before but was now confirmed. Pattyn is led to believe in God the way her aunt believes in him. Aunt J explains that one does not need "a Mormon husband to meet you at heaven's gates and pull you in", and believes that with love—true and forever love—heaven's gates will open wide. Ethan becomes a dream come true to Pattyn. With each moment they grow closer; it comes to a climax when Pattyn has sex for the first time with him.

Towards the end of the summer, Pattyn doesn't know what to do after she receives letters regarding Jackie receiving beatings as a stand-in for her pregnant mother. They do not confide in Aunt J in fear that she will contact the authorities. Unfortunately for Pattyn and Ethan, her father wants her back home for the school year. And with each day nearing Pattyn's departure, their lovemaking becomes riskier and more rushed.

Pattyn goes back to school as the more confident "new" Pattyn, as she calls herself, but quickly morphs back into "old" Pattyn after her father turns his rage on her. After some time, Pattyn finds out she is pregnant. Ethan and Pattyn plan to leave Nevada, keep the baby, and raise it together. After leaving town, they practice handling a 10 mm handgun for self-defense. In town, word quickly gets out to Pattyn's father and in an attempt to prevent her from leaving, calls his friend to stop them. In the ensuing car chase, Ethan goes on an icy road heading to California to escape the deputy's jurisdiction. But a turn has Ethan lose control and crash the car. In the hospital, Pattyn learns that both Ethan and her baby have died. Shortly after leaving the hospital, Pattyn's father exiles her from home. With nowhere to go, Pattyn vows vengeance on her father and others that have wronged her.

== Sequel ==
Ellen Hopkins released a sequel to Burned called Smoke on September 10, 2013. This book is told from the viewpoint of Pattyn as well as her sister, Jackie, and takes place shortly after the final events of the first book. Hopkins said she didn't plan to release a sequel but, because of high demand from her fans she decided to continue the series.

== Reception ==
Reception for the book has been mixed, with some criticizing the book's portrayal of Mormonism as a "stern, abusive and misogynistic faith." Jeff Gottesfeld characterized the book as "literary group character assassination" of Mormonism, adding that the church is "unrelentingly bashed" in the novel.

Kirkus Reviews positively reviewed the book, saying that it was "Sharp and heartbreaking." BlogCritics.org questioned the portrayal of the LDS Church in the book but wrote that "While ... this is a book for adults, as well as teens, it is a great read for anyone who likes the young adult genre."

In 2012, the American Library Association included the book in their list of Popular Paperbacks for Young Adults.

According to the American Library Association, Burned was the 83rd-most banned and challenged book in the United States between 2010 and 2019.
