= Crank (novel) =

2004 novel by Ellen Hopkins

- Author: Ellen Hopkins
- Language: English
- Genre: Young adult
- Publisher: Simon & Schuster
- Publication date: 2004
- Publication place: United States
- Media type: Print
- Pages: 537
- ISBN: 9780689865190
- OCLC: 56608998
- LC Class: PZ7.H7745 Cra 2004
- Followed by: Glass

Crank is a novel by Ellen Hopkins published in 2004. It is based loosely on the real life addictions of the author's daughter to crystal meth. The book is required reading in "many high schools, as well as many drug and drug court programs." However, the book has been banned in many locations due to complaints that the book's depictions of drug use, adult language, and sexual themes are inappropriate for some readers.

== Plot ==
Crank takes place the summer before and during the protagonist Kristina's junior year of high school. She is a straight-A honor roll student and decides to visit her father for three weeks. Her father is rarely home, leaving her a lot of time alone. Kristina meets a boy named Adam in Albuquerque, where she is staying with her father. Adam convinces Kristina to try crank (methamphetamine), or "the monster," but Kristina runs away the first time she tries it. She is attacked by three men, but before anything can happen to her she is saved by Adam. An antagonist, Lince, Adam's girlfriend, sees him comforting Kristina and jumps off of a balcony in a suicide attempt. Kristina starts a relationship with Adam, but feels guilty about Lince. When the three weeks are over, Kristina goes back to Reno, Nevada, where her mother's house is. Kristina is now addicted to crank.

In Reno, Kristina, now calling herself Bree, meets the characters Brendan and Chase at a water-park, and they exchange numbers. They both promise her crank. Chase and Kristina begin to get closer to one another, and they begin dating, though not exclusively. Kristina goes to see the antagonist Brendan, asking for more crank. Brendan drives them both out into the woods, where they get high together, and he starts to take off her clothes. When she says no, he becomes violent, claiming that he has "waited weeks," so she should "put up and shut up." He then starts ripping her clothes off and rapes her. Afterwards, Brendan takes her home and makes her pay for the drugs.

At home Kristina, still high and shaken up from the rape, writes a letter to Adam telling him she was raped. Soon though she abandons her letter and calls Chase to come over while her parents are out. Chase comes over and she tells him about Brendan before trying to persuade him to have sex with her. Chase says no, wanting to wait until she had healed from her rape. However, she does end up having sex with him later in the novel.

Kristina gets caught hitchhiking by a cop and goes to juvenile hall, where she gets a direct connection to a meth lab in Mexico through an inmate. Once she is released from Juvenile hall, Kristina uses her mom's Visa card to pay for the illegal narcotic, and she takes her new supply to her druggie friends on "The Avenue." At this part of the novel, Kristina has become a drug dealer, which she describes as making her instantly more "popular." Kristina now has a very large amount of crank on her hands, so she is getting high even more often. This leads to her becoming more irritable, causing her relationship with her mom to become even more strained. Kristina is also not showing up to classes, because she is spending all of her time getting high and dealing drugs on "The Avenue."

The story continues with Kristina discovering she is pregnant, soon after Brendan had raped her. Kristina spends the following days going through the symptoms of drug withdrawal. During this time in the novel, she believes that Chase is the father, having had sex with Chase a couple of weeks after being raped. After going to Planned Parenthood, she realizes Brendan is actually the father. At this point in the novel, Kristina begins to struggle with deciding if she should go through with the pregnancy because she "Feared the uncertainty of choosing parenthood" and "Doubted [she] could give [her] baby away." Kristina decides to have an abortion, but after feeling "A flutter in [her] belly," the child moving, she decides to keep her baby. After making this decision, Kristina tells her mother and stepfather about her pregnancy, although she does not reveal who the father is. The novel continues with Kristina giving birth to a baby boy, Hunter, who is described as 'healthy'. The narrative ends with Kristina implying that she is still using drugs, but is trying to stop.

== Characters ==
- Kristina Snow is the main character who gets addicted to crystal meth.
- Adam is a boy from Albuquerque. He is Kristina's first love interest and introduces Kristina to meth.
- Marie is Kristina's mother. She is described by Kristina as rigid and clean-cut, and does not share a good relationship with her daughter.
- Scott is Kristina's stepdad who feels very responsible for Kristina. He is described as "tall, lean, and great looking for 40." Later in the book he is also described as smelling "depressingly clean."
- Chase is a football player and one of Kristina's love interests. He is intelligent, talented, and kind.
- Trent is Kristina's childhood friend and Robyn's younger brother. He is openly gay and has been bullied because of his sexual orientation.
- Sarah is Kristina's childhood friend. She is Irish, smart, talkative, and has red hair and freckles.

== Background ==
Hopkins’s primary inspiration for her Crank series comes from her eldest daughter, who "was addicted to crystal methamphetamine and spent two years in prison." In 2007, her daughter had been sober for five years. As of 2017, Hopkins said her daughter had been clean for four years. Although the novel is fiction and is only "loosely based" on Hopkins' daughter's own story, it is according to Ellen Hopkins, 60% fact.

== Style and reception ==
The novel Crank is written in a form of free verse. Her poetry has been called "interior." Critics note that Ellen Hopkins's "hypnotic and jagged free verse," plays with the spacing of the words on the page, forming her signature "mirror poems." The narrative perspective of her work has been described as "combin[ing] outside analysis with first hand perspectives from behind the characters."

Addiction, the consequences of one's choices, and coming of age have all been noted as major themes in the novel. Reviewers explained that Crank "gives a look into ... drug addiction and its life changing consequences." Reviewers also noted Kristina must face that "there is no happy ending when it comes to addiction" and understand the consequences of her actions. Another major theme is coming of age, as critics say "Adolescence is a time of conflict and contradiction, [clearly seen in] the conflicted character Kristina/Bree in Crank."

Crank received mostly positive reviews. Publishers Weekly praised Hopkins, saying, "The author is definitely on a mission, she creates a world nearly as consuming and disturbing as the titular drug." Hopkins's books are widely known for their "gritty realism" and for talking about "[s]ubjects that are really big ... Suicide. Incest. Prostitution. Bulimia. Rehab." The Philadelphia Inquirer said that these "dark" subjects have not turned away teens; rather, "readers raced through hundreds of pages."

Niki Burnham mentioned that teens connect to Crank because Kristina is "someone very much like them or someone they might know." Hopkins has been praised for using her novel to educate teens on drug abuse. Judge John Tatro said, "Ellen has allowed her readers to see and understand the absolute horrors of methamphetamine from a user's perspective – not just from an adult lecturing in a classroom." Niki Burnham added, "What Hopkins does, in just a few paragraphs, shows readers how irrational and overwhelming an addiction to meth can be."

=== Censorship in the United States ===
Although Crank has been received with praise, it has also faced a significant amount of controversy. According to the American Library Association, the book has frequently been banned and challenged in the United States because of drugs, offensive language, and being sexually explicit. The book landed on the list of the top one hundred most commonly challenged books from 2010 to 2019 (38), as well as the top ten list in 2010 (4) and 2022 (10).

In 2009, Hopkins was "banned from speaking at an Oklahoma middle school because of the appropriateness of her subject matter." Hopkins responded to being banned, saying "she has heard from thousands of readers (including middle schoolers) that her books have helped to turn them away from drugs."

In 2022, Crank was listed among 52 books banned by the Alpine School District following the implementation of Utah law H.B. 374, “Sensitive Materials In Schools." Forty-two percent of removed books “feature LBGTQ+ characters and or themes.” Many of the books were removed because they were considered to contain pornographic material according to the new law, which defines porn using the following criteria:

- "The average person" would find that the material, on the whole, "appeals to prurient interest in sex"
- The material "is patently offensive in the description or depiction of nudity, sexual conduct, sexual excitement, sadomasochistic abuse, or excretion"
- The material, on the whole, "does not have serious literary, artistic, political or scientific value."

=== Awards and honors ===
Crank was a New York Times Bestselling novel.

The book received the following accolades:

- Quills Award nominee (2005)
- Book Sense Top 10 (2005)
- NYPL Recommended for Teens (2005)
- PSLA Top Ten for Teens (2005)
- Charlotte Award (2005)
- IRA Young Adult Choices Award (2005)
- Kentucky Bluegrass Award (2006)
- SSLI Honor Book Award (2006)
- Gateway Readers Awards winner (2006-2007)
- Missouri Gateway Readers Award (2007)
- Soaring Eagle Book Award (2008)
- Lincoln Award (2009)
- Green Mountain Book Award (2009)
- Deutscher Jugendliteraturpreis Nominee for Jugendbuch (2011)
- Goldener Lufti (2012)
