= Identical (Hopkins novel) =

2008 novel by Ellen Hopkins

- Author: Ellen Hopkins
- Language: English
- Genre: Young adult
- Publisher: Margaret K. McElderry
- Publication date: August 26, 2008
- Publication place: United States
- ISBN: 1-4169-5005-2
- OCLC: 173243703
- LC Class: PZ7.5.H67 Ide 2008

Identical is a 2008 young adult novel by American writer Ellen Hopkins. It hit The New York Times bestseller list. Hopkins has stated that "some of the material for the book came from friends, friends who are now strong successful women and you would never guess that abuse is in their past".

== Reception ==
Reception for Identical has been positive, with the School Library Journal writing that the book was "Gritty and compelling, this is not a comfortable read, but its keen insights make it hard to put down." Publishers Weekly and Kirkus Reviews also positively reviewed the book, with Kirkus praising the book's voices as well as Hopkins's "masterful shards of verse".

In 2009, Identical was named the fifth most popular book for teens via YALSA's 2009 Teens’ Top Ten award.

In 2025, Identical tied for the eighth most banned and challenged book in the United States.
