= Ralph Thompson (poet) =

Jamaican businessman and poet (1928–2022)

- Born: 19 April 1928; Poughkeepsie, New York, U.S.
- Died: 23 January 2022 (aged 93); Jamaica
- Education: St. George's College, Jamaica; Fordham University; University of South Florida

Ralph Thompson (19 April 1928 – 23 January 2022) was a Jamaican businessman, educational activist, artist and poet.

== Life and business career ==
Ralph Thompson was born in Poughkeepsie, New York, US, to a Jamaican mother and American father, but the marriage lasted only three years, and from 1931 Thompson and his sister were raised in Jamaica. His mother's family, "a mixture of crypto Jewish (Isaacs) and Irish stock (Fielding)", was "staunchly Catholic and claimed to be white". He was educated by Jesuits both at St. George's College in Kingston and at Fordham University in New York, where he earned a Doctor of Law degree in 1952. After graduation, he served for two years as an officer in the United States Air Force, principally in Japan, but returned to Jamaica in 1953, married a Jamaican, Doreen Lyons, in 1954, and thereafter lived in Kingston with his wife and children, save for a brief period in the 1970s.

Thompson's business career was initially in property development with Abe Issa, the "father of Jamaican tourism", then independently. After his return to Jamaica, he was deeply involved in governmental redevelopment of agriculture, and in 1988 was appointed a Commander of Distinction by the administration of Edward Seaga. Thompson's last major post was as CEO of Seprod Ltd, a large Jamaican manufacturing firm supplying household products and consumer goods for the local market.

Thompson was a noted educational activist, speaking on radio and TV, and frequently writing for The Gleaner and The Jamaica Observer. He was also an amateur painter, and publicly exhibited several times in Kingston; a selection of his paintings was published by Peepal Tree Press in 2008.

== Poetry ==
During his residence in Florida in the late 1970s, Thompson took a master's degree in English literature at the University of South Florida, submitted some poems as part of an assignment, and was encouraged to publish them. He began to write poetry more intensively, and in 1987 Alan Ross accepted "Florida" for the London Magazine. Thompson subsequently published more than 20 poems in British, US, and Caribbean journals, including The Caribbean Writer and Mississippi Review. His work is represented in The Heinemann Book of Caribbean Poetry (1992), A World of Poetry for CXC (1994), several Observer Arts Magazine anthologies, The Oxford Book of Caribbean Verse (2005), and Writers Who Paint / Painters Who Write (2007).

He published two collections of poetry and a verse novel:

- The Denting of a Wave (Leeds: Peepal Tree Press, 1992), ISBN 0-948833-62-9
- Moving On (Leeds: Peepal Tree Press, 1997), ISBN 978-1-900715-17-1
- View from Mount Diablo (Leeds: Peepal Tree Press, 2003; annotated 2nd edition, Leeds: Peepal Tree Press, & Tirril: Humanities-Ebooks, 2009), ISBN 1-900715-81-3 (2003), ISBN 978-1-84523-144-6 (2009 paperback), ISBN 978-1-84760-093-6 (2009 digital).

These volumes were all positively reviewed both in local Jamaican publications and in The Caribbean Review of Books and The Caribbean Writer. Thompson was encouraged to write View from Mount Diablo by Derek Walcott, a personal friend. It won the Jamaican National Literary Prize in manuscript in 2001, and was also warmly praised by the Pulitzer Prize-winning Jamaican-American poet Louis Simpson:

View from Mount Diablo is a remarkable achievement. Its knowledge of the island, the entwining of private lives and politics, lifts Jamaican poetry to a level that has not been attempted before. The poetry is strong, imaginative, fascinating in detail. It describes terrible things with understatement, yet with compassion. I don't think anything could be more harrowing than the rape of Chantal, or the boy begging Alexander to spare his life. ... This is narrative poetry at its best.

The verse novel was serialised in The Jamaica Observer, and the first edition sold more than 300 copies in Jamaica (where the average sale of any new paperback is about 70 copies).

In 2006, a CD of Thompson reading 28 of his poems, entitled Taking Words for a Walk, was released by the Intermedia Foundation, NY. In the liner notes, the Jamaican poet Edward Baugh, Professor Emeritus of Caribbean Literature at the University of the West Indies, Mona, wrote:

Rippling through these poems, nuancing their meaning, is an alertness to class and color distinctions, which grounds the poems in Jamaican social reality and no doubt in the poet's own place in that reality. In "Carpenters", for instance, it matters that peasant Malcolm is "purple black," while the boy is "nearly white." In the sharply, wittily satirical "Pride and Prejudice", the central factor of color consciousness and discrimination operates across cultural boundaries. On a more ominous note are the poems which evoke the sense of social malaise and schism in contemporary Jamaica, a malaise that seems to threaten violent upheaval, poems such as "Vigil", "Death of a Honda Rider", "Jamaican Gothic", "The Garden", and "This New Light".

In October 2015, Thompson received the Silver Musgrave Medal for his contribution to literature.

Thompson died, aged 93, on 23 January 2022.
