= Karen Hesse =

American writer

- Born: August 29, 1952 (age 74); Baltimore, Maryland
- Education: Towson State College; University of Maryland, College Park
- Spouse: Randy Hesse
- Writing career
- Notable awards: Newbery Medal; MacArthur Fellow

Karen S. Hesse (born August 29, 1952) is an American author of children's literature and literature for young adults, often with historical settings. She received the Newbery Medal for Out of the Dust (1997).

== Early years and education ==
Karen Hesse was born in Baltimore, Maryland. She studied at nearby Towson State College and married Randy Hesse in 1971 before completing her studies. She attended college at Towson State College and the University of Maryland. She earned a B.A. in English with double minors in psychology, and anthropology, during which she began publishing poetry.

== Career ==
After graduating, she moved with her husband to Brattleboro, Vermont, had two children, Rachel and Kate, took jobs in publishing, and started writing children's books.

Her first novel was a rejected story about meeting Bigfoot, but her next proposal was published by Henry Holt in 1991 as Wish on a Unicorn.

Out of the Dust is a story of a girl living through the dust bowl of the Depression. The mother of the central character dies giving birth to her stillborn brother Franklin. After the mother dies, Billie Jo and her father try to continue with their lives.

Hesse tackled a more disturbing subject in the 2001 verse novel Witness. The Ku Klux Klan, re-invigorated in the 1920s (in this book, 1924 and '25) tries to take over a small Vermont town. The book is written from the perspectives of several people - Merlin Van Tornhout and Johnny Reeves, both members of the Klan; Sara Chickering, a farmer; Esther Hirsh, a six-year-old Jewish girl; Leonora Sutter, an African American girl; Iris Weaver, a restaurateur; Harvey and Viola Pettibone, shop owners; Reynard Alexander, a newspaper editor; Fitzgerald Flitt, the doctor; and Percelle Johnson, the town constable. In Witness Hesse continued the distinctive poetic/prose style she pioneered in Out of the Dust.

Hesse also wrote The Music of Dolphins, about a girl who was raised by dolphins.

Stowaway, first published in 2000 by Simon & Schuster USA, is based on the true story of an 11-year-old boy who stowed away on Captain James Cook's ship Endeavour in 1768. The UK version of this book is published under the title Young Nick's Head. It is in the format of a diary written by Nicholas Young, the cabin boy on the Endeavour.

Brooklyn Bridge is based on the true story of the family who created the teddy bear in Brooklyn in 1903.

At age 68 years, she was living with her husband, still in Brattleboro, Vermont.

== Awards ==
Hesse was a MacArthur Fellow in 2002.

For Out of the Dust (Scholastic, 1997), she won the Newbery Medal from the American Library Association, recognizing the year's "most distinguished contribution to American literature for children", and the annual Scott O'Dell Award for Historical Fiction.

Letters from Rifka (MacMillan, 1992) won an International Reading Association Award and a National Jewish Book Award.

In 2012 Hesse received the Phoenix Award from the Children's Literature Association for Letters from Rifka, recognizing the best children's book published twenty years earlier that did not win a major award.

== Works ==
- 1991, Wish on a Unicorn (Henry Holt, ISBN 978-0-8050-1572-0, reprint Google Books edition, Macmillan, 2009, ISBN 978-0-312-37611-6)
- 1992, Letters from Rifka (MacMillan, 1992) (reprint Macmillan, 2009, ISBN 978-0-312-53561-2)
- 1993, Lester's Dog, illus. Nancy Carpenter (Crown, ISBN 978-0-517-58357-9)
- 1993, Poppy's Chair, illus. Kay Life (Macmillan, ISBN 978-0-02-743705-8)
- 1994, Phoenix Rising (Macmillan, ISBN 978-0-8050-3108-9)
- 1994, Sable, illus. Marcia Sewall (Henry Holt, ISBN 9780805024166) (Google Books edition, San Val, ISBN 978-0-613-08689-9)
- 1995, A Time of Angels (Hyperion, ISBN 9780786800872)
- 1995, Lavender, illus. Andrew Glass (Google Books edition, Macmillan, ISBN 978-0-8050-4257-3)
- 1996, The Music of Dolphins (Google Books edition, Scholastic, ISBN 978-0-590-89797-6)
- 1997, Out of the Dust (Google Books edition, Scholastic, ISBN 978-0-590-36080-7)
- 1998, Just Juice, illus. Robert Andrew Parker (Google Books edition, Scholastic, ISBN 978-0-590-03383-1)
- 1999, Come on, Rain, illus. Jon J. Muth (Scholastic, ISBN 978-0-590-33125-8)
- 1999, A Light in the Storm: the Civil War Diary of Amelia Martin (Scholastic, ISBN 978-0-439-44557-3)
- 2000, Stowaway (Google Books edition, Simon & Schuster, ISBN 978-0-689-83987-0)
- 2001, Witness (Google Books edition, Scholastic, ISBN 978-0-439-27200-1)
- 2003, Aleutian Sparrow (Google Books edition, Simon & Schuster, ISBN 978-0-689-86189-5)
- 2003, The Stone Lamp: Eight Stories of Hanukkah through History, illus. J. Brian Pinkney (Hyperion, ISBN 978-0-7868-0619-5)
- 2004, The Cats in Krasinski Square, illus. Wendy Watson (Google Books edition, Scholastic, ISBN 978-0-439-43540-6)
- 2005 The Young Hans Christian Andersen (Scholastic, ISBN 978-0-439-67990-9)
- 2008, Spuds, illus. Wendy Watson (Scholastic, ISBN 978-0-439-87993-4)
- 2008, Brooklyn Bridge (Google Books edition, Macmillan, ISBN 978-0-312-37886-8)
- 2011, "Nell" — a short story included in the young-adult anthology What You Wish For (Putnam, ISBN 978-0-399-25454-3) (also available on Tor.com)
- 2012, Safekeeping (Feiwel & Friends, ISBN 9781250011343)
- 2016, My Thumb (Feiwel & Friends, ISBN 978-0-312-67120-4)
- 2018, "Night Job" (Candlewick Press), ISBN 978-0763662387)
- 2022, "Granny and Bean" (Candlewick Press)ISBN 9781536214048)
