= Perfect (Hopkins novel) =

2011 novel by Ellen Hopkins

- First edition
- Author: Ellen Hopkins
- Language: English
- Genre: Young adult
- Publisher: Margaret K. McElderry Books
- Publication date: September 13, 2011
- Pages: 640
- Preceded by: Impulse

Perfect is a young adult novel written by American author Ellen Hopkins. Like all of Ellen Hopkin's works, the novel is unusual for its free verse format. Perfect is the sequel to Impulse.

== Plot ==
From the bookjacket

"Everyone has something, someone, somewhere else that they’d rather be. For four high-school seniors, their goals of perfection are just as different as the paths they take to get there.

Cara’s parents’ unrealistic expectations have already sent her twin brother Conner spiraling toward suicide. For her, perfect means rejecting their ideals to take a chance on a new kind of love. Kendra covets the perfect face and body—no matter what surgeries and drugs she needs to get there. To score his perfect home run—on the field and off—Sean will sacrifice more than he can ever win back. And Andre realizes that to follow his heart and achieve his perfect performance, he’ll be living a life his ancestors would never understand.

Everyone wants to be perfect, but when perfection loses its meaning, how far will you go? What would you give up to be perfect?"

== Characters ==
- Cara Sykes: Cara is the twin of Conner Sykes. She is trying to live up to her parents' expectations while at the same time struggling with her sexuality.
- Kendra Mathieson: Kendra is the ex-girlfriend of Conner Sykes. She has been in beauty pageants her whole life and plans on being a model. She gets plastic surgery and develops an eating disorder to be "perfect."
- Sean O'Connell: Sean is Cara's longtime boyfriend. He wants a baseball scholarship to Stanford to be with her. He develops an addiction to steroids to be a great baseball player.
- Andre Kane III: Andre is an African American boy from an extremely wealthy family. His parents expect him to enter a well paying career, though Andre secretly wants to become a dancer, and takes private lessons in secret.

== Reception ==
Critical reception to Perfect has been positive, with the LA Times saying "Hopkins is painfully adept at channeling perfectionist psychology... It's an ambitious idea, powerfully executed." Publishers Weekly criticized the "overabundance of plot points", but stated that the book "explores enough hot-button issues (rape, teen plastic surgery, cyberharassment, etc.) to intrigue her fans and recruit new ones". Kirkus Reviews wrote that "While not razor-edged like her previous work, Hopkins’ portrait of four 12th-graders who are expected to be perfect will nonetheless keep teens up all night reading."
