= Virginia Euwer Wolff =

American children's book author

Virginia Euwer Wolff (born August 25, 1937) is an American author of children's literature. Her award-winning series Make Lemonade features a 14-year-old girl named LaVaughn, who babysits for the children of a 17-year-old single mother. There are three books. The second, True Believer, won the 2001 National Book Award for Young People's Literature. The second and third, This Full House (2009), garnered Kirkus Reviews starred reviews. (Note: Kirkus Reviews of the three Lemonade novels (above) recommended them for readers age 10+, 12–16, and 13–15, and stated or implied that the heroine is 14, 15, and 17 years old. Evidently they compose a realist "coming-of-age" trilogy featuring an underprivileged urban girl.) She was the recipient of the 2011 NSK Neustadt Prize for Children's Literature, honoring her entire body of work.

== Biography ==
Virginia Euwer Wolff was born in Portland, Oregon in 1937. She grew up in a log house with no electricity, on an apple and pear orchard. In 1945, she began violin lessons, which encouraged her love of music. She attended the girls' school St. Helen's Hall (now Oregon Episcopal School) and Smith College. She married Arthur Richard Wolff in 1959. They divorced in 1976.

In 2003, St. Helen's Hall honored Wolff with a Distinguished Alumna Award. She has lived in New York, Philadelphia, and Washington D.C., but now reads, writes, and plays chamber music in Oregon.

She is currently writing an untitled fiction book, covering themes such as war, travel and peace. The characters are written to be brave, foolish and goofy. They also "Do not know what a Kardashian is".

== Books ==
- This Full House First ed. New York: HarperCollins Children's Books 2009. ISBN 978-0-06-158304-9
  — concluding the Lemonade trilogy
  - Kirkus Review (starred) 02/01/2009
- True Believer First ed. New York: Atheneum Books for Young Readers, 2001. ISBN 0-689-85288-6
  — sequel to Make Lemonade
  - Kirkus Review (starred) 02/01/2001
  - Award: 2001 National Book Award, Young People's Literature (U.S.)
  - Award: Best Children's Books 2001 by Publishers Weekly.
  - Junior Library Guild Selection
  - Top Ten Book of the Year from the Young Adult Library Services Association
- Bat 6 Henry Holt and Co., 1998 ISBN 0-03-066279-6
  - Kirkus Review 05/01/1998
  - Oregon Reads 2009 Selection
- Make Lemonade. First ed., Henry Holt and Co., 1993 (and many other editions)
  - Kirkus Review 05/01/1993
  - Citation: American Library Association Notable Children's Book
  - Award: Booklist Top of the List winner
- The Mozart Season. First ed. New York: Henry Holt and Co., 1991.
  - Kirkus Review 05/15/1991
  - Award: 2011 Phoenix Award from the Children's Literature Association as the best English-language children's book that did not a major award when it was originally published twenty years earlier. That is named for the mythical bird phoenix, which is reborn from its ashes, to suggest the book's rise from obscurity.
- Probably Still Nick Swansen. First ed. New York: Henry Holt and Co., 1988.
- Rated PG New York: St. Martin's Press, 1981.
