= Out of the Dust =

1997 verse novel by Karen Hesse

Out of the Dust.
- First edition
- Author: Karen Hesse
- Illustrator: Daniel Mullins
- Language: English
- Genre: Children's historical fiction
- Publisher: Scholastic Press, a division of Scholastic Inc.
- Publication place: United States
- Media type: Print (Hardback & Paperback)
- Pages: 227 pp (first edition, hardback)
- ISBN: 0-590-36080-9 (first edition, hardback)
- OCLC: 36123638
- LC Class: PZ7.H4364 Ou 1997

Out of the Dust is a children's verse novel written by Karen Hesse, first published on October 1, 1997. The novel follows the life of Billie Jo, a girl living in the panhandle of Oklahoma, from the beginning of 1934 to the end of 1935.

Hesse received the Newbery Medal and the Scott O'Dell Award for the novel. The novel received positive reviews.

== Background ==
Out of the Dust was inspired by reactions that Hesse’s writer’s group had to another one of her novels, Come on Rain. The group questioned why the main character in Come on Rain wanted the rain, prompting Hesse to think about the Dust Bowl and, eventually, to write Out of the Dust. The book was also inspired by a visit to Kansas when Hesse experienced a tornado.

Hesse conducted detailed research before writing the book. To ensure the accuracy of her novel, Hesse worked with the Oklahoma Historical Society while writing Out of the Dust.

The jacket of the novel features a picture of a girl from Let Us Now Praise Famous Men, which Hesse used in her writing to represent Billie Jo to herself.

== Synopsis ==
The novel is composed of poems that are dated between January 1934 and December 1935. The novel begins with a poem about the narrator, Billie Jo’s birth. Her father named her Billie Jo because he wanted a boy. She lives with her mother and father in Joyce City, Oklahoma. When Billie Jo is 14, her mother tells the family that she is expecting again. Later that month, a friend of Billie’s moves to California, and Billie Jo finds herself wanting to leave.

Billie Jo also plays the piano and starts performing with Arley Wanderdale and Mad Dog Craddock.

The Dust Bowl is making life in Joyce City difficult because crops are not growing due to the dust and the lack of rain, and the scarcity of food crops is making food more expensive. Billie Jo’s parents remain stoic in the face of their hardships.

In July 1934, Billie Jo’s father put a pail of kerosene next to the stove. Her mother thought it was water and accidentally started a fire. She ran outside to find her father. Billie Jo thinks to throw out the kerosene to prevent a fire from starting in the house, but does not see her mother running back and throws the kerosene onto her mother. Billie Jo tries to save her mother, even using her hands to put out the flames, but she is unable to do so. She also badly burns her hands in the process. Her mother is left badly burned and needs assistance even to drink water. Her mother dies in August, giving birth to Billie Jo’s brother, who died soon after. Although no one says it to her, Billie Jo knows that people talk about her throwing the pail of kerosene. Billie Jo’s relationship with her father becomes strained.

Billie Jo notices the way people treat her differently now that her hands are badly burned, going out of their way not to mention them. Only Arley Wanderdale mentions them when he says that Billie Jo could play the piano again if she tried. Now that her mother is gone, the work of cleaning the house and getting rid of the dust falls to Billie Jo, since her father barely says anything.

Billie Jo begins practicing the piano at school because of an upcoming competition in town. She comes in third place, but many competitors said that she only won because the judges felt bad for her and her hands. At another show that Arley asks her to play at, Billie Jo realizes that she is not as good as she once was because her hands do not work the same way.

Many people start leaving the panhandle and migrating west to California. Billie Jo plans to escape Joyce City and sneaks away to get on a train in the middle of the night. She gets off the train in Arizona, but quickly decides to go back home. When she gets back home, her father is waiting for her at the station, and they begin talking as they walk back home and start to mend their relationship.

Billie Jo convinces her father to go to the doctor for spots that have been growing on his face. The doctor tells Billie Jo that using her hands is the best way for them to get better.

A woman named Louise stayed with Billie Jo’s father while she was away, and the two of them became close. Billie Jo likes her but is still protective of her mother. However, she slowly becomes more comfortable with Louise taking a more prominent role in their lives. The novel ends with Louise and Billie Jo’s father doing chores in the kitchen while Billie Jo plays the piano.

== Genre and style ==
Out of the Dust is a verse novel that is written in the form of a journal of Billie Jo. It is an early example of a verse novel in children’s literature. Hesse always intended Out of the Dust to be written as a verse novel, in free verse. She felt that the economic conditions of the Dust Bowl were better communicated by being frugal with words. She also insists that the difficult themes discussed in the novel are why it is important for children to read it.

== Use in the classroom ==
The setting in which Hesse chooses to write the novel provides opportunities for teachers to examine the Dust Bowl in the classroom. The book is also effective in the classroom because of its simple vocabulary. Since the poems read like diary entries, the book is be effective for journal-writing assignments. Sarah K. Clark suggests having students engage in pre-reading activities that give students important background information about the Dust Bowl to increase their interest in the book. Clark also encourages consistent engagement with the book through response journals and other activities. The book can be used to teach students about the stages of grief, the history of the United States during the Dust Bowl, the geography of Oklahoma, wind erosion, and to develop vocabulary.

However, Lisa Simon found that use of Out of the Dust in the classroom without a consideration of the absence of race in the novel creates a distorted perspective of the history of race in the United States among students.

== Analysis ==
Lisa Simon criticized the novel's lack of focus on non-white viewpoints despite the historical context of the setting.

Vikki VanSickle proposed that the treatment of the dust and the land in Out of the Dust amounts to the land being an active character in the novel. She suggests that Billie Jo's closure only comes from accepting her place in her homeland rather than trying to escape it.

Walton Bacham suggested that Billie Jo's father's continued belief that the land will be restored and be able to grow crops is symbolic of the Job in the Old Testament, and that Billie Jo's healing process after being broken by the conditions of her life makes her a New Testament figure.

== Reception ==
Brenda Bowen wrote in the Horn Book Magazine that Hesse’s careful word choice was evident in Out of the Dust. Publishers Weekly praised the novel for its intimacy and emotional descriptiveness. Thomas Owens claimed that Out of the Dust was likely to become Hesse's signature work. Carrie Sehadle praised the free-verse form said that the events in the novel would fascinate, but horrify some readers. Further, Walton Beacham referred to the novel as a “high-minded, literary work,” and an accurate portrayal of the experiences of farmers and ranchers during the Dust Bowl.

== Awards ==
Out of the Dust has received the following accolades:

- 1998, Newbery Medal
- 1998, Scott O'Dell Award
- 1998, American Library Association, Best Books for Young Adults
- 1998, American Library Association, Notable Children’s Book
- 1998, School Library Journal, Best Book of the Year
- 1998, Booklist, Editor's Choice
- 1998, Book Links, "Lasting Connection”
- 1998, Publishers Weekly, Best Book of the Year

Awards
Preceded by The View from Saturday	Newbery Medal recipient 1998	Succeeded by Holes
