= The School for Good and Evil (novel) =

2013 novel

- US first edition cover
- Author: Soman Chainani
- Illustrator: Iacopo Bruno
- Cover artist: Iacopo Bruno
- Language: English
- Series: The School for Good and Evil
- Genre: Fairytale fantasy
- Publisher: HarperCollins
- Publication date: May 14, 2013 (US); June 6, 2013 (UK)
- Publication place: United States
- Pages: 544 (paperback); 488 (hardcover)
- Followed by: A World Without Princes
- Website: schoolforgoodandevil.com/books/the-school-for-good-and-evil/

The School for Good and Evil is a 2013 fairytale fantasy novel written by Soman Chainani. The first novel in The School for Good and Evil series and Chainani's debut novel, it follows Sophie, a beautiful girl who believes she will be a Princess, and her friend Agatha, an oddity who is deemed a witch by the villagers, who are kidnapped by the School Master and taken to the School for Good and Evil. After their fortunes are reversed, Agatha is taken to the School for Good while Sophie is taken to the School for Evil, their friendship is put to the test.

The book was first published in the United States on May 14, 2013, by HarperCollins. It was published in the United Kingdom on June 6 of the same year. It is followed by five sequels and was made into a film adaptation by Netflix. The film received generally negative reviews from critics, who criticized the narrative and storytelling, but praised its cast and visuals.

== Plot ==
Every four years in the village of Gavaldon, two children are kidnapped by an unknown force into the surrounding Endless Woods, wherein a school allegedly lies where the heroes and villains of tales of folklore are trained. While most of the children and their families fear the unknown force taking them away, Sophie dreams of attending this school, where she can have her very own Happily Ever After with a charming prince. Sophie’s best friend Agatha, with her sulky attitude, ugly appearance, and negative outlook on the world, is the complete opposite of her. Combined with the fact that she lives with her outcast mother right next to a graveyard, she is deemed by the villagers to be a witch and a perfect candidate for the School for Evil. In spite of this, Agatha desires nothing more than to live a normal life in peace. When the feared day of abduction arrives again, Agatha hides in her home, but rushes out to rescue Sophie when Sophie lets herself get captured, causing Agatha to be pulled along with her.

Much to their horror, the girls are sent to the "wrong" schools: Sophie ends up as a "Never", a student in the School for Evil, and Agatha an "Ever", a student in the School for Good. When they have the opportunity to see each other during the common orientation for both schools, Agatha tries to convince Sophie to go home with her so they can stay together as friends, but Sophie is determined that she is meant to be in the School for Good and is smitten soon after by the most popular prince in school, Tedros, who happens to be the son of King Arthur. He also takes notice of her, but soon finds himself running into Agatha much more often.

During their first day, Sophie makes every effort to flunk her classes, only to receive the highest rank in all of them. Agatha does fail at most of her lessons, but soon discovers she can hear and grant wishes, something that can only come from a purely Good heart. Following an ordeal in which they both face hours of punishment for disorderly conduct at the end of the day, Sophie agrees to leave with Agatha the first chance she gets.

Having learned about what happens in the mysterious School Master’s tower, Agatha sneaks out that night with Sophie to ask him to send them home. There, they find a sentient quill called the Storian writing a brand new fairy tale involving them as the main characters—a very unusual thing as most fairy tales do not begin until after their protagonists have graduated. The School Master explains that he is unable to send them home because of this, but he does give them a riddle to solve if they want to prove they were sent to the wrong schools; he promises to let them leave as soon as they act out the ending to their tale.

When the girls figure out the answer to the riddle - True Love's Kiss — Agatha sets out with a plan to help Sophie rise in status enough to get in league with Tedros. As Sophie advances in rank, she finds herself embracing Evil life more and more, to the extent that she becomes domineering towards even her fellow schoolmates.

Agatha makes various attempts to help her friend use her newfound skills to get Tedros' kiss but soon finds out that Sophie is only using Agatha to make Tedros fall for her. That way, she would never have to leave, as she believes Tedros is destined to be her true love in her fairy tale. Finally, Tedros promises to kiss Sophie if they emerge as the last two survivors in the Trial by Tale, an event in which the top Evers and Nevers enter the Woods, aiming to survive the night by avoiding teachers' traps and the opposite side. By having an Ever and a Never come out together alive, they could prove that both sides can be victorious at once in a fight for a happy ending - a big upset to the laws that have always governed the fairy tale world.

Their relationship ends along with the Trial when Sophie refuses to save Tedros from a deadly attack, prompting Agatha's illegal participation to achieve their desired outcome. Sophie tries to cover up Agatha’s actions as her own, but Tedros learns the truth almost immediately. Consequently, Tedros starts to develop feelings for Agatha, while Sophie begins to show deepening resentment and anger towards her.

Both girls begin to undergo subtle but sure changes: Agatha finds her own inner beauty after consultation with the Dean of Good, fairy godmother Clarissa Dovey, while Sophie begins to suffer from dreams telling her she must kill Agatha in order to survive in her fairy tale. In the next major school event, Agatha arrives looking more beautiful than all the other Evers courtesy of Professor Dovey, and at the end Tedros confesses his love for Agatha and asks her to be his date for the Evers' Snow Ball, to which she accepts. In response, Sophie, now a full-fledged witch, proceeds to destroy both schools and attempt to eliminate Agatha in accordance with her fairy tale.

Determined for her happy ending, Sophie finds the School Master's true identity to be Evil as the Storian is atoning for the Evil School Master's murder of the Good one, and as he tells her about his wish for his one true love, Sophie. She believes that she can find Happily Ever After with him instead of Tedros and that she was Evil all along, but upon kissing him, she heartrendingly remembers Nevers are incapable of love. As Agatha catches up with her best friend, the School Master prepares to kill her so that he can take Sophie for himself. Just as the Storian is about to spear Agatha's heart, Sophie does something that shocks the School Master—she steps in front of her best friend, sacrificing her own life for her. The ghost of the deceased Good brother returns to save his students, and since only seers can hold dead souls, seer and history teacher, Professor August Sader sacrifices his own body to help the Good brother to destroy the Evil School Master and dies in the process. Sophie dies shortly after, losing too much blood to the cut at her heart, and Agatha, distraught, kisses her. Not long after this, however, Sophie revives as Agatha's kiss has proven that Evil can love and true love doesn't require a prince. She and Agatha are teleported back to Gavaldon, leaving Tedros in disappointment as his one true love has disappeared from him just before the Evers’ Snow Ball. This leaves the students of the schools in surprise as they realize the teachings about Good and Evil being incapable of friendship were not true.

== Background ==
When Chainani was young, he owned only a TV set and VHS tapes of Disney animated films, which were "all [he] watched" until the age of eight. He stated that "everything [he] learned about storytelling — and about fairy tales in general — [he] learned from Disney."

After attending college, Chainani learnt about fairy tales, and was fascinated by the differences between the original stories and Disney adaptations. "Somewhere" between the differences, "The School for Good and Evil was born." Chainani felt the Disney adaptations took the original fairy tales, which were more dark, complex and filled with horror, and "pasteurized" them to make them more "appropriate" for younger audiences. With The School for Good and Evil, he wanted to "get back to the core of the original stories and give young readers a taste of what a real fairy tale is." Chainani wanted the characters to be unsafe, with no "warmth" in the narrator and no predictability of a happy ending. Chainani described what he wanted to do as creating "a new fairy tale", which was "just as unleashed and unhinged as the old stories that found the anxieties of today's children."

Chainani first had the idea of The School for Good and Evil in June 2010 while finishing the development of his first feature film, Love Marriage, as director. He began working on a treatment as a screenplay but realized it had to be a novel. When Chainani was working with producer Jane Startz on an adaptation of The Pushcart War, he presented the idea of The School for Good and Evil which she dubbed books. In the United States, the book was published on May 14, 2013, while in the United Kingdom, it was published on June 6 of the same year. On The New York Times Best Seller list, the book debuted at #7 within the first week of its publication.

== Promotion ==
The School for Good and Evil was one of the most anticipated fantasy young adult novels of 2013. On March 21, 2013, a book trailer was published on YouTube by Shelf Stuff. Entertainment Weekly called the trailer "imaginative". Chainani also completed an eight-city national tour and appeared at a "Bookstormer Dinner". Additionally, HarperCollins Children's Books distributed "Ever" and "Never" buttons at conferences.

== Translations ==
By October 8, 2019, the book had been translated into 28 languages. By May 2020, the book had been translated into at least 30 languages. Languages which translation rights have been sold to include Chinese, Dutch, Taiwanese, Czech, Slovak, Lithuanian, Italian, Brazilian Portuguese, European Portuguese, Russian, Hebrew, Greek, French, Indonesian, Thai, Spanish, German, Norwegian and Bulgarian.

== Reception ==
Michael Berry of Common Sense Media stated the book was "no run-of-the-mill fairy tale spin-off." He praised the wit and insight though he criticized the repetition, calling it "burdensome". The Herald's Garry Scott commended the character of Sophie, the ending, character developments, simple words and speeches, stating he came across "the most marvellous feeling that [he has] ever come across in a book". Writing for NPR, Selena Simmons-Duffin called the book series a "low-key empire". Kirkus Reviews said the series was "rich and strange", complimented the cover and described the series as being more strong on set pieces rather than internal logic. As of July 2020, the book has sold over 2.5 million copies.

== Future ==
=== Sequels ===
On April 15, 2014, a sequel titled A World Without Princes was published. On July 21 of the following year, The Last Ever After was published. Quests for Glory was published on September 19, 2017. It was followed by A Crystal of Time and One True King, published on March 5, 2019, and June 2, 2020.

=== Adaptation ===
Shortly after its publication, Universal Studios acquired rights to adapt the book into a film. In 2020, Netflix announced it would be taking over with Paul Feig as director. On December 18, 2020, Sofia Wylie and Sophia Anne Caruso were cast as the leads. The adaptation was released on October 19, 2022.
