= Ashleigh Ross =

Australian actress

- Born: Ashleigh Maree Ross; 7 October 1999 (age 27); Sydney, New South Wales, Australia
- Other name: Ashi Ross
- Occupations: Dancer; Singer; Actress; Model; Influencer; Fashion designer
- Years active: 2009-present
- Known for: Back of the Net (2019); The Gamers 2037 (2020-2021); The Red Shoes: Next Step (2023)
- Parents: Jim Ross (father); Joy Ross (mother)

Ashleigh Maree Ross (born 7 October 1999), also known as Ashi Ross, is an Australian actress, singer, dancer, fashion designer, influencer and model, best known for her roles as Charlotte in Back of the Net (2019), Xeon in 26 episodes of The Gamers 2037 (2020-2021) and Andrea in The Red Shoes: Next Step (2023).

== Life and career ==
Ashleigh Ross was born on 7 October 1999 in Sydney, New South Wales, Australia, to her father Jim and mother Joy. Ross has two older sisters. Ross started dancing and gymnastics when she was 4 years old. She also began her acting career in 2009 at age 9 when she played May in an episode of My Place. In 2010 at age 10, she appeared as Okinawa in an episode of Spirited, as well as playing Scout in 2 episodes of Dance Academy.

Major theatre roles for TML Enterprises that Ross has played were Jane Banks in Mary Poppins in 2011 and Jemima Potts in Chitty Chitty Bang Bang in 2012. In 2014 at the age of 14 when Ross began modelling for the popular Australian dance brand "Energetiks", she designed and launched her exclusive dancewear line, called "Ashi by Energetiks". On the same year, Ross guest starred in an episode of Creative Kids. In 2015, she played Linda Brent in an episode of A Place to Call Home, as well as guest starring in an episode of The Talk. On the same year when Ross started off her career as a dancer, assisting RADAR technique workshops, she also assisted Dance Moms star Abby Lee Miller in the United States a few times. In 2016, Ross did a Turn board commercial with Mackenzie Ziegler, as well as guest starring in an episode of Australia's Got Talent. In March 2017, Ross won a Nickelodeon Kids Choice Award for the category "Favorite #famous".

In 2019, Ross played Charlotte in the sports comedy Back of the Net, alongside The School for Good and Evil star Sofia Wylie. On the same year, Ross also played Bridget Devlin in the short film Ritual. In the 2020s, Ross played Xeon in 26 episodes of The Gamers 2037, as well as playing Andrea in the 2023 dance film The Red Shoes: Next Step.

== Filmography ==
=== Film ===
Year	Title	Role	Note(s)
2019	Back of the Net	Charlotte	Feature film
2019	Ritual	Bridget Devlin	Short film
2023	The Red Shoes: Next Step	Andrea	Feature film

=== Television ===
Year	Title	Role	Note(s)
2009	My Place	May	Episode: "1888 Victoria"
2010	Spirited	Okinawa	Episode: "I Remember Nothing"
2010	Dance Academy	Scout	2 episodes
2014	Creative Kids	Guest	Episode: "How to Be a Dancer"
2015	A Place to Call Home	Linda Brent	Episode: "Too Old to Dream"
2015	The Talk	Dancer	Episode: "2015 Halloween Celebration"
2016	Australia's Got Talent	Self - Dancer	Episode: "Auditions 1"
2020-2021	The Gamers 2037	Xeon	26 episodes

=== Theatre ===
Year	Title	Role	Location(s)	Ref.
2011	Mary Poppins	Jane Banks	The Capitol Theatre, 3-15 Campbell Street, Haymarket, Sydney, New South Wales, Australia	
2012	Chitty Chitty Bang Bang	Jemima Potts	The Capitol Theatre, 3-15 Campbell Street, Haymarket, Sydney, New South Wales, Australia	

== Awards ==
Year	Awards Show	Category	Nominee(s)	Result	Ref.
2011	BroadwayWorld Australia Awards	Best Younger Actress	Mary Poppins	Won	
2017	Nickelodeon Kids' Choice Awards	Favorite #famous	Various Talents	Nominated	
