= A World Without Princes =

2014 novel by Soman Chainani

- Author: Soman Chainani
- Illustrator: Iacopo Bruno
- Cover artist: Iacopo Bruno
- Language: English
- Series: The School for Good and Evil
- Genre: Fairytale fantasy
- Publisher: HarperCollins
- Publication date: April 15, 2014
- Publication place: United States
- Pages: 512 (paperback); 448 (hardcover)
- Preceded by: The School for Good and Evil
- Followed by: The Last Ever After
- Website: www.schoolforgoodandevil.com/books/a-world-without-princes

A World Without Princes is a 2014 fairytale fantasy novel by Soman Chainani. The second book of The School for Good and Evil series and set after the events of the first novel, the book follows Sophie and Agatha who have returned to the village of Gavaldon, ending the "curse". However, Agatha secretly wishes for a different ending, reopening the gates to the School for Good and Evil which have become the School for Girls and Boys. First published on April 15, 2014, the book garnered positive reviews from critics.

== Plot ==
Best friends Agatha and Sophie return home to Gavaldon, and are welcomed as heroes. While Agatha wants nothing to do with fame, Sophie takes advantage of her newfound spotlight, and puts on many shows to celebrate their return home and their escape from the School for Good and Evil. At Sophie's father's wedding, Agatha suddenly wishes for another ending to her story: with Tedros. With this wish, magical arrows, with messages attached, are shot into the town, the messages demanding the return of Sophie. Angry, the town forms a mob, demanding Sophie be given over to whoever wants her. The Elders of the town agree to protect her, but secretly plan to give her to the mob. Agatha leaves Sophie alone in the town church, believing her to be safe.

Sophie is taken into the forest surrounding the town, and is hung from a tree, with the message "Take Me" written on her chest in her own blood, and left to die. Agatha finds Sophie, and the two run away, attempting to avoid the mob. They arrive at clearing with a line of flowers running through it, and notice butterflies attempting to help them. Unknowingly, they board a train bound for the School of Good and Evil.

Arriving at the doors of the School for Good (changed to the School for Girls), they are swamped by a herd of girls from both schools robed in blue. The girls are introduced to their classmates and are shown around the school by the new Dean, Evelyn Sader, half-sister of the History Professor August Sader. They notice that the school has changed, and that the fairy tales on the walls have changed as a result, with the damsels in distress once depicted having now become warrior women. Agatha mentions the absence of boys, and it is discovered that after they left, all the girls from the School for Evil were expelled, and sought refuge at the School for Good. The boys from the School for Good were then expelled by an unseen force, and forced to go to the School for Evil, which changed to the School for Boys.

As the truth and impact of what they have done settle on the girls, Sophie is horrified to discover that they are back due to Agatha's wish for a different ending to their fairytale - one where she ends up with Tedros. Agatha denies this and insists that all she wants to do is return home. Agatha sneaks into the School for Boys, with Sophie following her under an invisibility cape to stop her from kissing Tedros. Agatha attempts to speak with Tedros and almost kisses him. The moment before she does, Tedros becomes paranoid about Sophie still being alive and seeking revenge, and begins arguing with Agatha angrily. As they argue, Sophie, hidden underneath a table in the room, seizes the opportunity and shoots a spell between them. Agatha thinks Tedros attacked her and Tedros thinks Agatha attacked him, and the two start fighting.

Agatha flees, convinced that Tedros is evil. She returns to the School for Girls where Sophie is waiting for her, pretending not to have known a thing. Eventually, it is decided that one of the girls must become a boy to infiltrate into the School for Boys and steal the Storian. Sophie is chosen, due to her surprisingly masculine sense of willpower and perseverance. She infiltrates the school under the name of Filip (Filip of Mount Honora), the name her father originally wanted to name his child before she was born, believing that she would be a boy. Filip and Tedros have problems at first, but soon, Filip begins to protect Tedros, and they eventually become best friends. Filip confesses to Tedros that he would do anything to see his mother again. Tedros says he would not want to see his, as his father (King Arthur) sent out a warrant for her head, after she had cheated on him with Sir Lancelot. Tedros confesses that when he turns 16, he will have to honour that warrant.

Later on in the forest at the Trial by Tale, Agatha hides when Fillip approaches with Tedros. Soon, Agatha sees that Tedros leans in to kiss Filip, but Agatha only sees their lips almost touch. This causes a dispute between the three, and Filip turns back into Sophie as the spell wears off. Tedros is confused and angry, but Evelyn has her butterflies fly out of the trees as they carry the Storian and Evelyn to the trio. Evelyn brings out Sophie and Agatha's fairy tale book and lets the Storian write. Agatha and Tedros kiss because Agatha told Sophie that she couldn't trust her anymore, and Sophie was turning into a witch again. The Storian is about to finish writing the end, but Evelyn stops it. Evelyn reveals that it was not Agatha's wish that brought them back to the school, but rather Sophie's wish to see her mother, who had been abandoned by her husband when she fell sick and later died. Sophie, in grief, having lost her village, her family, and now her best friend, accepts her wish, and Evelyn conjures the School Master's ghost, in the guise of Sophie's mother. Sophie kisses the ghost and as it becomes the School Master, who explains that a true love's kiss can even revive the dead, just as Agatha revived Sophie. The School Master kills Evelyn and sends Agatha home. The School Master tries to kill Tedros, but Agatha manages to grab Tedros and takes him with her. Sophie, however, is left behind refusing to leave the School Master, stating that he was the only one who didn't abandon her. The two schools become a malevolent School for Evil together. As the two girls are separated, they both remain in the arms of the ones who love them, their wishes granted.

== Background ==
Chainani stated when he had come up with the idea for The School for Good and Evil, remembered writing down "Book 2: A World Without Princes": "My brain clearly had the series worked out in my subconscious — because the title was waiting for me all along." He liked the idea of Agatha not being a "trustworthy" hero since he grew bored of stories where the heroes always made the right choices. In the book, Agatha had to choose between her prince and her best friend in which there was no right answer.

A World Without Princes was first published on April 15, 2014. On March 18, 2014, a trailer was released which was animated by Manny Palad and Michael Blank.

The book has been translated into at least 23 languages.

== Reception ==
In his review on Common Sense Media, Michael Berry gave the book four out of five stars. While praising the confrontations, scheming and observations on fairy tales, he criticized the unnecessary complications, sloppy prose, odd verb choices and "rushed and repetitive" narrative. Kirkus Reviews complimented the book's "clever switcheroos".

The Guardian writer Emily Potter found this 2nd book of the series to be just as good as the first. Even with new characters added, she fell in love with them and enjoyed the continuation of twists and turns, a theme from the first book.

== Sequels ==
On July 21, 2015, a sequel titled The Last Ever After was published. This was followed by the publications of Quests for Glory, A Crystal of Time and One True King on September 19, 2017, March 5, 2019, and June 2, 2020.
