= Josh Heuston =

Australian actor and model (born 1996)

- Born: Joshua Heuston-Richardson; 18 November 1996 (age 30); Sydney, Australia
- Education: Macquarie University
- Occupation: Actor
- Years active: 2015–present

Joshua Heuston (born 18 November 1996) is an Australian actor and model. He is best known for his roles in the Australian television series Dive Club (2021), Heartbreak High, Bali 2002 (both 2022), and Off Campus (2026).

== Early life and education ==
Heuston was born on 18 November 1996. He was raised in western Sydney, growing up in Baulkham Hills. He lived with his mother, a psychologist, and two younger sisters, Charlie and Ashley. He is of Anglo heritage on his mother's side and Sri Lankan heritage on his father's side.

== Career ==
=== Modelling ===
Heuston was working as a bartender during first year at university when he was scouted to be a model. After some thought, he explored photography and style then started seriously posting to Instagram and YouTube where he quickly became a sought after content creator. Heuston has worked on campaigns for major brands such as Fendi, Gucci, Louis Vuitton, David Jones and Burberry among many others. He was invited to sit in the front row of the Milan and Shanghai catwalk for Tommynow Drive by Tommy Hilfiger and did a meet and greet for the brand in Sydney.

In 2018, he made his Australian Fashion Week debut walking for the brand 'Justin Cassin'.

In 2020, Heuston was part of a campaign for Bumble in Australia where his dating profile was featured and encouraged "virtual dating" during the pandemic.

=== Acting ===
Heuston stated that he was betrayed by his own shyness and never pursued drama while at school. After featuring in the music video for Super Cruel's song "Sicklaced" with Cartia Mallan in 2017, Heuston fell in love with acting and started classes.

Heuston's screen acting debut came in the Network 10 teen thriller series Dive Club, starring alongside Miah Maddern and Georgia-May Davis, which aired on Network 10 in Australia followed by an international Netflix release. The series is set in the fictional seaside town of Cape Mercy and focuses on a group of school girl ocean divers. Heuston plays the part of Henry, the towns resident sad boy with a heart of gold. The series was filmed on the Great Barrier Reef in Port Douglas, Queensland.

Heuston had a small non-speaking role in Thor: Love and Thunder as a Zeus Pretty Boy. He played Dusty in Heartbreak High (2022–2024), a Netflix reboot of the 1990s series of the same name. In December 2022, it was announced that Heuston has been cast as Constantine Corrino in the 2024 HBO Dune prequel television series, Dune: Prophecy.

In 2026, Heuston performed in the main cast of the Amazon Prime Video show Off Campus as Justin Kohl.

== Personal life ==
Heuston has been in a relationship with co-star Mika Abdalla since mid-2026. The two met on the set of the show Off Campus.

== Filmography ==
=== Film ===
Year	Title	Role	Notes
2022	Thor: Love and Thunder	Zeus Pretty Boy	
2023	Finally Me	Barry	
2023	My Heart Calls for You	Henri Bassett	Short film
2025	Dangerous Animals	Moses Markley	

=== Television series ===
Year	Title	Role	Notes
2021	Dive Club	Henry	12 episodes
2022	More Than This	Sammy	6 episodes
2022	Bali 2002	Luke Beasley	3 episodes (miniseries)
2022–2026	Heartbreak High	Dusty Reid	12 episodes (seasons 1–3)
2024–present	Dune: Prophecy	Constantine Corrino	4 episodes
2026	Off Campus	Justin Kohl	8 episodes

== See also ==
- List of Australian film actors
