= Alyssa-Jane Cook =

Australian actress (born 1967)

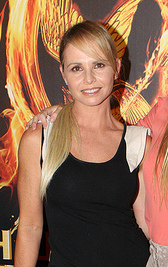
- Cook in 2012
- Born: 16 February 1967 (age 59); Territory of Papua and New Guinea
- Occupations: Actress; singer; presenter
- Years active: 1984–present
- Spouse: Gary Davis
- Children: Georgia-May Davis; Ruby-May Davis; Lucca Davis

Alyssa-Jane Cook (born 16 February 1967) is an Australian actress, singer, and TV presenter currently on TVSN.

== Actress roles ==
She is best known for her regular role as Lisa Bennett on the Australian television soap opera E Street. She played the lead role of Olivia Murray in the series Above the Law, and appeared as Kelli Edwards in Home and Away.

As a presenter, she hosted the series Sex/Life, co-hosted Australia’s Funniest People, and was a regular on Home Life Style, Beauty and the Beast, and Good News Week.

In the science fiction series Farscape she appeared as the character Gilina Renaez in the episodes "PK Tech Girl", "Nerve", "The Hidden Memory", and "John Quixote".

On stage, Cook played Columbia in The New Rocky Horror Show 1992 Australian tour, and has appeared in The Vagina Monologues.

In 2008, Cook was the face of weight-loss company Bodytrim. She appeared in advertisements on Australian TV for their products. Cook was also the face of the Christmas shopping company Castle Hampers and featured in their TV ads as well.

Cook is now a presenter on Australian shopping network, TVSN.

== Personal life ==
Alyssa-Jane Cook lives in Sydney with her husband Gary Davis and their three children, including Georgia-May, who was the oldest cast member of the 2012 production of Young Talent Time on Channel Ten and stars in Dive Club.

== Filmography ==
=== Film ===
Year	Title	Role	Notes
1997	Paws	Trish	
2002	Almost Time	Alyssa Cook	
2003	Subterano	Mary	
2003	Bells of Innocence	Alyssa Cook	

=== Television ===
Year	Title	Role	Notes
1984	Sons and Daughters	Girl	Episode 1407
1985	Winners	Angie Spry	Episode: "Room to Move"
1985	A Country Practice	Debbie Lucas	Episodes: "Breaking Point: Parts 1 & 2"
1987	Vietnam	Deb	TV miniseries
1988	Home and Away	Maureen	Episode 181
1989–1992	E Street	Lisa Bennett	Regular role
1993	A Country Practice	Theresa Osmond	Episodes: "Outside Chance: Parts 1 & 2"
1994	G.P.	Linda Floyd	Episode: "Coitus Interruptus"
1994	Time Trax	Marcia	Episode: "Catch Me If You Can"
1995	Mission Top Secret	Angel	Episode: "Return of the Dinosaur"
1999–2000, 2002	Farscape	Gilina Renaez	Episodes: "PK Tech Girl", "Nerve", "The Hidden Memory", "John Quixote"
2000	Above the Law	Olivia Murray	Main role
2002	Seconds to Spare	Kristin	TV film
2002	Home and Away	Kelli Edwards	Recurring role
2007	Where Are They Now?	Guest/herself	With E Street cast Bruce Samazan, Marcus Graham, Melissa Tkautz, Brooke 'Mikey' Anderson, Melissa Bell & Vince Martin
2008	The Strip	Sam Gleeson	Episode: "Tied Up in a Red Suitcase"
2009	Packed to the Rafters	Pauline	Episode: "Changes"
