= Steve Jaggi =

Canadian-Australian film producer and director

- Born: Calgary, Alberta, Canada
- Occupation(s): Film director, producer
- Years active: 2005 - present

Steve Jaggi is film producer, film director and showrunner. His surname is of Swiss-German etymology.

Jaggi has produced the teen films Swimming for Gold, starring Peyton List, which was released by Universal Pictures and on Hulu; tween film Back of the Net, starring Sofia Wylie which premiered at the 2018 CinefestOz film festival, and was acquired by Netflix and Disney Channel; teen film Rip Tide, starring Debby Ryan, which premiered at the 2017 Sydney Film Festival and was acquired by Netflix, Embedded; Spirit of the Game; Ambrosia; Circle of Lies; Temptation; the documentary London Tango; and the short-lived British cable television series Be On TV.

Jaggi has directed Chocolate Oyster, which premiered at the 2018 Sydney Film Festival, and the documentary And The Beat Goes On. He also acts as an executive producer, with credits including Rough Stuff, Skin Deep, Zelos and Crushed.

In 2020 he was showrunning and producing the 12-episode teen series Dive Club for Netflix and Network 10.
