= Golja =

Golja is a surname. Notable people with the surname include:

- Ana Golja, Canadian actress and singer
- Lana Golja, Australian actress
- Suzana Golja, Croatian handball player
