= Back of the Net =

- Directed by: Louise Alston
- Written by: Casie Tabanou; Alison Spuck McNeeley
- Story by: Clay Glen
- Produced by: Steve Jaggi
- Starring: Sofia Wylie; Tiarnie Coupland; Trae Robin; Gemma Chua-Tran; Ashleigh Ross; Yasmin Honeychurch; Raj Labade; Christopher Kirby; Melissa Bonne; Kate Box
- Cinematography: Emilio Abbonizio
- Edited by: Charlotte Cutting
- Music by: Angela Little
- Production companies: MarVista Entertainment; Create NSW; The Steve Jaggi Company
- Distributed by: Umbrella Entertainment
- Release dates: 11 April 2019 (Queensland, Victoria, Tasmania); 18 April 2019 (Australia); 15 June 2019 (United States)
- Running time: 86 minutes
- Countries: Australia; United States
- Language: English

Back of the Net is a 2019 sports comedy film produced by The Steve Jaggi Company and distributed by Umbrella Entertainment. Directed by Louise Alston and written by Alison Spuck McNeeley and Casie Tabanou. The film stars Sofia Wylie, Christopher Kirby, Melissa Bonne, Trae Robin, Tiarnie Coupland, Kate Box, Yasmin Honeychurch, Gemma Chua-Tran and Raj Labade. The story follows a smart and brainy American girl named Cory, who seeks to spend her semester on a science research program before she accidentally gets on the wrong bus and ends up spending her semester at the Harold Soccer Academy.

== Plot ==
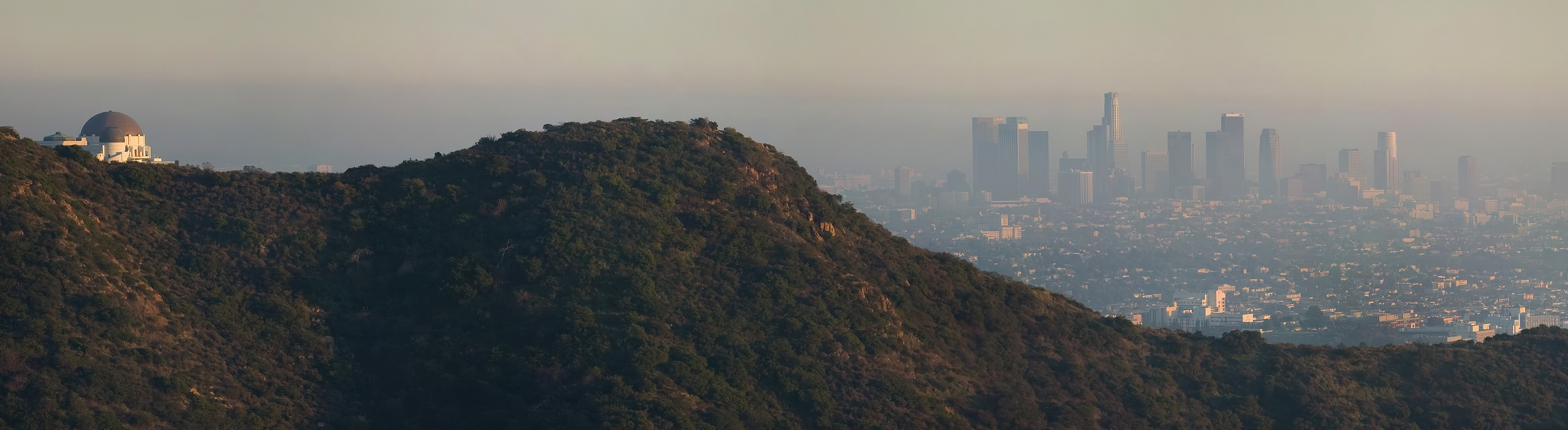
Los Angeles, the city that Cory Bailey lives in.

Cory Bailey, a science student, living in Los Angeles, dreams of researching the ocean professionally. Her parents, David Bailey and Rebecca Bailey support her aspiration of becoming a scientist. During the summer holiday, Cory decides to join the Sea Science program organized by the Harold Academy. However, she gets on the wrong bus and finds herself arriving at the training center of the Harold Soccer Academy. Unwilling to miss the research program, she tries to contact the person in charge of the Sea Science program to escape. Unfortunately, she fails and has to stay in the soccer camp.

On the first day of the camp, she needs to attend various lessons, from science lessons, soccer training to experiment lessons. She performs well in both science and experiment lessons but does poorly in soccer training. However, her masterful performance during experiment lessons catches the attention of Oliver, the most talented soccer player in the school, to make friends with her.

After the first day of training, a room has been assigned for Cory to rest. She meets a lot of friends who are amateurs of soccer like her. They name their team as the Worst of the Best (WOTB).

As the day of the National Soccer Competition approaches nearer, Cory and Oliver become closer due to the post-class discussion about the scientific theory of soccer. This triggers the jealousy of Edie, the best friend of Oliver since they were young. Edie decides to prank Cory on her glowing pickle demonstration. She destroys the experimental setup of Cory and insults her for her soccer skill after training.

Cory feels depressed and demanding after being insulted; she wants to give up on football and change to a new school to continue her research. Fortunately, her friends come to Cory, who is deeply disappointed to comfort and cheer her up. She is touched that her friends support her all the time and decides to move on.

After hearing the news from Coach Smith that the school will not be sponsoring WOTB the upcoming year unless the team has stellar results, everyone is devastated as they think it is impossible for them to win any match. Rather than being struck a blow, Cory is motivated to explore new ways to help the team overcome this daunting time. She applies her knowledge of science into the mode of training of the team. Combining with the theory of physics, the performance of the WOTB improves drastically in the latest pieces of training.

On the day of the National Soccer Competition, Worst of the Best beats various teams from other schools and promotes to the final. The opponent in the final is the Elite team of the Harold Soccer Academy. The score was tied towards the end of the match. Unfortunately, one of the team members of WOTB accidentally gets hurt, and Cory has to go into the match to replace her teammate. Applying her science knowledge, Cory scores at the last minute of the match, and the team finally wins the title of the competition.

After WOTB wins the competition, Cory does not celebrate and insult Edie about the competition. Instead, she comforts and cheers her up that every day is a chance to be someone you were not yesterday. Edie feels touched and apologizes for the prank on Cory. At last, they become friends and celebrate the honor of Harold Soccer Academy together.

== Cast ==
- Sofia Wylie as Cory Bailey, an intelligent and brainy science student who wins the Nation Soccer competition after getting on the wrong bus.
  Sofia Wylie, who plays the main character in the film
- Christopher Kirby as David Bailey, father of Cory, supports his daughter from chasing her dream.
- Melissa Bonne as Rebecca Bailey, mother of Cory, supports her daughter from chasing her dream.
- Trae Robin as Oliver, the most talented and famous soccer player in the men's elite team of the Harold Soccer Academy.
- Tiarnie Coupland as Edie, the most talented and famous soccer player in the girls’ elite team of the Harold Soccer Academy.
- Kate Box as Coach Smith, the coach of the Worst of the Best.
- Raj Labade as Lewis, member of the men's elite team and the best friend of Oliver and Edie.
- Gemma Chua-Tran as Janessa, member of the Worst of the Best.
- Yasmin Honeychurch as Adelle, member of the Worst of the Best.
- Ashleigh Ross as Charlotte, member of the Worst of the Best.
- Nick Bolton as Mr Oster, the science teacher of Cory in the Harold Soccer Academy.
- Caitlin Foord as herself, an Australian professional soccer player, in reality, the guest of honor of the National Soccer competition.

== Production ==
=== Filming ===
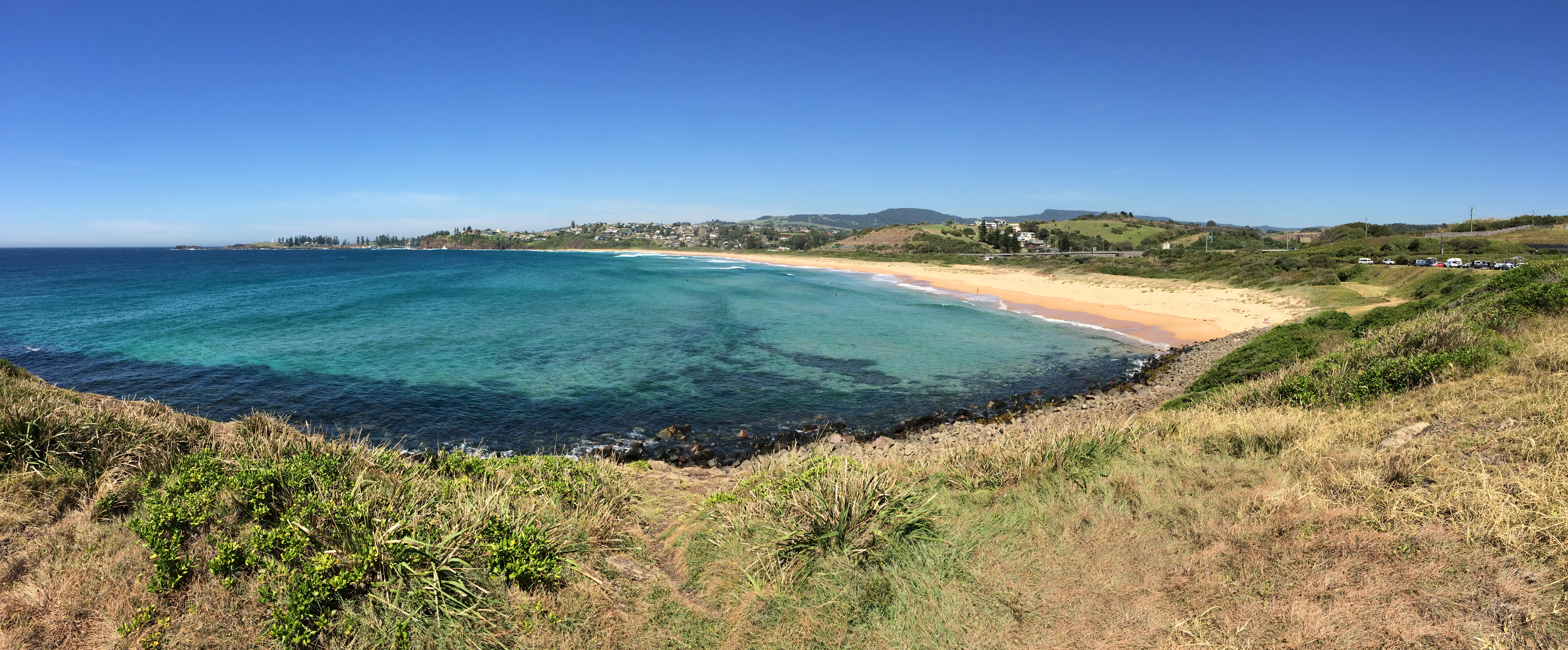
Bombo Quarry, the filming location of the film.

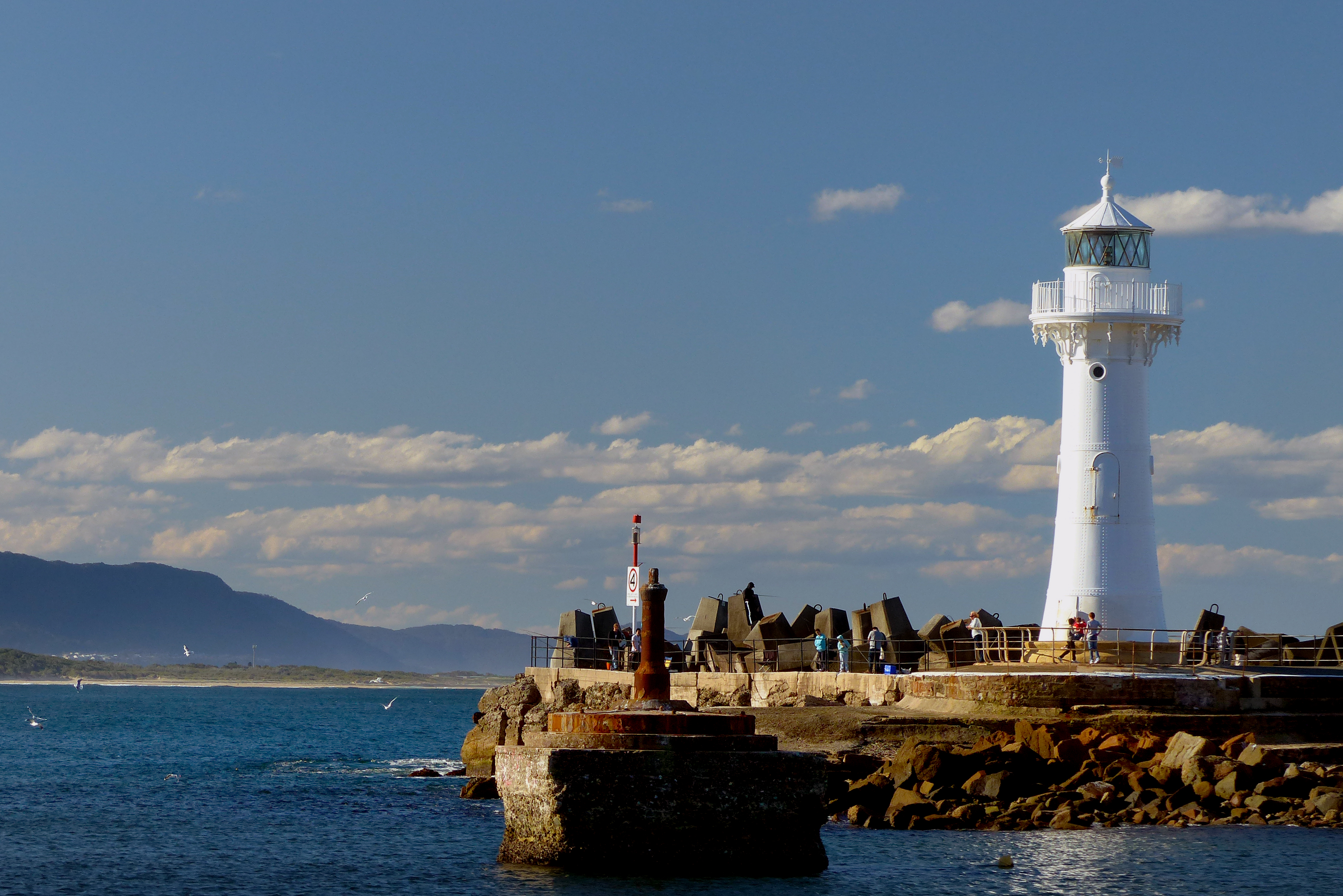
Wollongong, the filming location of the film.

Filming of Back of the Net took place in Wollongong and Kiama, including the Innovation Campus and Bombo Quarry since April 2018. The Steve Jaggi Company has worked with the local council and Destination Wollongong (DW) to ensure the availability of the filming site.

=== Visual effects ===
Several visual effects techniques were used during production. The lead visual effects company was Cumulus VFX. According to Louise, stylish animation and CG elements are provided in the film to enhance the story, and the visual effects in the film are better than what she and her team had expected.

== Release ==
Back of the Net had its world premiere at the CinefestOZ on Sunday, 26 August 2018, and was selected as part of the line-up for The Vision Splendid Outback Film Festival in June–July 2019.

It was scheduled for theatrical release in Australia on 18 April 2019, and was released on DVD and video on demand on 7 August 2019.

In the United States, it premiered on 15 June 2019 on Disney Channel. It became available on Netflix in the country on 21 December 2019 and left exactly 4 years later on 21 December 2023.

== Reception ==
=== Critical response ===
Critical response to Back of the Net has been “fair,” and it has been described as the perfect mix of the coming of age films of the past with new plot points and character complexity. Review aggregator website Rotten Tomatoes reports that 50% of six reviews of the film were positive, with an average rating of 5.8/10. The site's critics consensus reads, “Back of the Net is an entertaining if unremarkable piece of pre-teen fluff enlivened by entertaining performances, moments of likable charm, and a refreshing message.” According to Common sense media, which complied six reviews and calculated an average score of 3 out of 5, the film received “solid acclaim.”

Australian Council on Children and the Media (ACCM) called the film "a sweet Australian children's film, that shows anyone can succeed if they work together. There are great performances by the younger cast; some comic relief from the girls' soccer coach; and strong moral messages of friendship, teamwork, and acceptance." Apart from the acclamation from ACCM, they also recommend this film for the children aged 8–13 due to acknowledging the film's message about the meaning and purpose of friendship and teamwork.

Reviews were not uniformly positive. Sandra Hall of The Sydney Morning Herald concluded that "Although the script gets much better treatment than it deserves thanks to the spirit and exuberance of a cast who seem delighted to be doing what they are doing, and the NSW south coast and its beaches add to the sparkling sense of well-being that permeates the whole film, the cultural cringe afflicting the plot is pretty hard to take." Alex Lines shared the same sentiment from the Film Inquiry. He felt that “the film features a protagonist who operates life through the application of textbook formulas, because she's stuck in a film that's chosen to do the same.”
