= Worst Year of My Life Again =

Australian children's television series

- Genre: Comedy drama
- Created by: Mark Brotherhood
- Starring: Ned Napier; Laurence Boxhall; Tiarnie Coupland; Lana Golja; Xander Speight; Liam Erck; Jessie Blott
- Country of origin: Australia
- Original language: English
- No. of series: 1
- No. of episodes: 13

Production
- Executive producers: Jenny Buckland; Bernadette O'Mahony; Ross Allsop
- Producers: Ross Allsop; Bernadette O'Mahony
- Editor: Philip Watts
- Running time: 30 minutes
- Production companies: Australian Children’s Television Foundation; Reflective Pictures

Original release
- Network: CBBC
- Release: 26 April – 19 July 2014

Worst Year of My Life Again is an Australian children's television series that premiered on 26 April 2014 on ABC3. It was produced by the Australian Children's Television Foundation (ACTF) and Reflective Pictures for the Australian Broadcasting Corporation. Filming for the show began on 23 April 2013 at Camberwell High School and ended on 15 November 2013. The show also aired on CBBC. On 18 October 2014, the show's cancellation was announced.

== Synopsis ==
When Alex King goes to bed on the eve of his 15th birthday, he is relieved that the last disastrous year is finally over. But when he wakes up, time has reset itself and he's going to have to relive the worst year of his life all over again.

== Cast ==
- Ned Napier as Alex King, the main character who has the bad luck. Clumsy, awkward, timid, and impulsive, his attempts to alter the timeloop usually leads to disaster and humiliation for him.
- Laurence Boxhall as Simon Birch, Alex's main best friend. He is quirky, quick-witted and comical. He also loves Alex's older sister, Sam, though she doesn't feel the same. He also can be cocky and overconfident, which gets him into trouble often. He claims to be of English heritage.
- Tiarnie Coupland as Maddy Kent, Alex's friend. She is very intelligent, yet ditzy and spontaneous, with a bit of a bubbly side. She is trying to convince Alex that he doesn't belong with Nicola because she secretly has a liking towards him (though he never realizes this at all) and also explaining why the universe reset his year.
- Lana Golja as Nicola Grey, Alex's love interest. Blonde and beautiful, but also self-centered and a snobbish bully, she was even said to "stuff a kid in a very small backpack." She was also said to have, "stuck a sausage up a boy's nose!" She tolerates Alex but clearly has no feelings for him.
- Xander Speight as Parker, the school bully. Parker and his assistant, Howe (Liam Erck), humiliate Alex wherever they can. His last name or reasons for bullying are never revealed.
- Liam Erck as Howe, Parker's assistant
- Kaiting Yap as Loren, Nicola's snobbish friend
- Jessie Blott as Amy, also Nicola's rude friend
- Bellamy Duke as Big Hannah, an unusually tall, tough girl who has a crush on Alex.
- Fergus McLaren as Toby McPherson
- Arielle O'Neil as Samantha King, Alex's elder sister. She is usually dominant over Alex despite him being considerably taller than her. Sam seems to enjoy seeing her brother's antics turn into humiliation for him, whereas she often has good fortunes. Like Parker, she picks on Alex and often blackmails him for her own pleasures.
- Annie Jones as Johanna King, Alex and Sam's rather naive mother. She can be well-intentioned but also rash.
- Jeremy Stanford as Lanford King, Alex and Sam's father. He has an unhealthy competitive streak that can work against him at times, leading to great humiliation.
- Syd Brisbane as Quinnford Norris, the school dean and math teacher. An extremely bitter, insensitive, and disciplinary man, he often gives detentions at the drop of a hat. Quinnford seldom smiles, rather always having a scowl on his face, despises romance, music, and art, and believes all children deserve harsh punishments for goofing off. He has a deep hatred of Alex (though he is often hostile and unfriendly towards many other students too), treating him coldly for being late for class or just merely encountering him in the hall. His first name or why he hates Alex so deeply are never mentioned. However it probably resulted from an incident from his past with Alex's father, who was formerly his best friend.
- Sally McLean as Miss Giddens, the school librarian who rules her domain with an iron fist.
- Kingsley O'Connor as Troy, Seagate's very own sporting superstar who is captain of the boys' football team. However, his grades are less than adequate in other subjects.

== Episodes ==
| No. | Title | Australian air date | U.K. air date |
|---|---|---|---|
| 1 | "Happy Birthdays" | 26 April 2014 | 26 May 2014 |
| 2 | "Valentine's Day" | 3 May 2014 | 27 May 2014 |
Valentine's Day is Alex's perfect opportunity to woo the girl of his dreams, but his declaration of love ends up in the wrong hands. So the universe makes it start over again.
| 3 | "Beach" | 10 May 2014 | 28 May 2014 |
It's fund-raising day at the life-saving club, and Alex gets on the wrong side of his nemesis Mr Norris, as Gibbo and The Gal from EZ1-FM kick-off a treasure hunt.
| 4 | "April Fool" | 17 May 2014 | 29 May 2014 |
Alex intends to use his 'loop year' to turn the tables on Simon, who has used him as his April Fool target each year.
| 5 | "Sam's Party" | 24 May 2014 | 2 June 2014 |
When Alex and his sister Sam are left home alone for the night, they decide they should host a house party - with disastrous consequences.
| 6 | "Maths Test" | 31 May 2014 | 3 June 2014 |
Alex arrives late to Mr Norris's maths lesson, resulting in Mr Norris giving the whole class a maths test.
| 7 | "Match Day" | 7 June 2014 | 4 June 2014 |
It's the grand final for Alex's soccer team the Mad Dogs, but after he causes a major mix up in a sports store, it's up to Alex's soccer-mad Dad to step in and save the day.
| 8 | "Cross Country" | 14 June 2014 | 5 June 2014 |
Alex is determined to win the boys' cross country race, even if he has to cheat.
| 9 | "School Play" | 21 June 2014 | 9 June 2014 |
Alex is thrilled when he gets the chance to play Romeo opposite Nicola's Juliet in the school play. Can he finally land a kiss with his dream girl?
| 10 | "Halloween" | 28 June 2014 | 10 June 2014 |
Alex creates a cool costume to wear to Nicola's Halloween celebrations, but will he get to the party without getting trick or treated?
| 11 | "Concert Tickets" | 5 July 2014 | 11 June 2014 |
Alex realises he's got a chance to win Nicola over when he sees an opportunity to get hold of concert tickets for her favourite band Boys AZ-1. He's just got to chase down a garbage truck and dig through his own household rubbish first.
| 12 | "Christmas" | 12 July 2014 | 12 June 2014 |
Alex does everything he can to speed up his mum's Christmas Day plans, so he can get to Nicola's beach barbeque party.
| 13 | "The Last Day" | 19 July 2014 | 12 June 2014 |
It's the last day of the school holidays and, at the local pool, Alex is determined to get Nicola alone to profess his love for her.
