= The Gamers 2037 =

- Genre: Science fiction
- Starring: Miah Madden; Marvin Rowland; Ashleigh Ross; Keaton Stewart; Sarah Spackman
- Country of origin: Australia
- Original language: English
- No. of seasons: 1
- No. of episodes: 26

Production
- Producer: Ambience Entertainment
- Production location: Sydney, Australia

Original release
- Network: 9Go!
- Release: November 14, 2020 – present

The Gamers 2037 is an Australian television program for children which made its 9Go! debut on 14 November 2020.

== Cast ==
- Miah Madden as Kite
- Marvin Rowland as Galahad
- Ashleigh Ross as Xeon
- Keaton Stewart as Game Master
- Sarah Spackman as Computer Voice

== Production ==
Speech Graphics provided the computer facial animation for the show. The Gamers 2037 was made into 26 episodes by Ambience Entertainment.

== See also ==
- Random and Whacky
- For Real
