= Tiarnie Coupland =

Australian actress and singer

- Born: 16 April 1997 (age 29); Australia
- Occupations: Actress; model; singer
- Years active: 2005–present

Tiarnie Coupland (born 16 April 1997) is an Australian actress, model and singer. She has appeared in numerous films, TV series, short films, TV commercials and theatre productions.

On 23 January 2015 Coupland released her debut song "Focus".

Coupland was nominated for a Logie Award for Best New Talent in 2017 for her role as Maggie in Love Child.

Coupland is signed to modeling agency IMG Models. In 2017, she was selected to be the face of Sportsgirl's "Urban Folk" collection, and jewellery retailer Jan Logan's "Amavi" collection.

== Filmography ==
Film
Year	Title	Role
2007	The Final Winter	Jessica
2012	Kiss of the Damned	Young Mimi
2016	Killing Ground	Em Baker
2017	The Half Dead	Sally
2019	Back of the Net	Edie

Television
Year	Title	Role
2008	The Upside Down Show	Guest Lead Actor
2014	Worst Year of My Life Again	Maddy Kent
2016	Love Child	Maggie
2016	Neighbours	Nikki Jackson
2018	Jack Irish	Gus

Short film
Year	Title	Role
2009	Franswa Sharl	Kylie Logan
2009	Denouement	Daughter
2016	Ari	Jess

== Awards ==
Year	Awards show	Category	Work	Result	Ref.
2014	47th Awgie Awards	Children's Television (C Classification)	Worst Year of My Life Again	Nominated	
2015	AACTA Awards	Best Children's Television Series	Worst Year of My Life Again	Nominated	
2015	Logie Awards	Most Outstanding Children's Program	Worst Year of My Life Again	Nominated	
2016	Logie Awards	Best New Talent	Love Child	Nominated	
