= The School for Good and Evil =

Book series by Soman Chainani

- Cover for the first book in the series
- The School Years: The School for Good and Evil (2013); A World Without Princes (2014); The Last Ever After (2015); The Ever Never Handbook (2016 companion); The Camelot Years: Quests for Glory (2018); A Crystal of Time (2019); One True King (2020); Prequel series: Rise of the School for Good and Evil (2022); Fall of the School for Good and Evil (2023)
- Author: Soman Chainani
- Illustrator: Iacopo Bruno (Illustrator)
- Cover artist: Iacopo Bruno
- Country: United States
- Language: English
- Genre: Fantasy, young adult fiction, fairytale, Bildungsroman
- Publisher: HarperCollins
- Published: 2013–2023
- Media type: Print, hardcover, e-book, audiobook
- No. of books: 9

The School for Good and Evil is a series of books by Soman Chainani based on fairy tales. The first novel in the series was published on May 14, 2013. The series is set in a fictional widespread location known as the Endless Woods.

The original trilogy (known as The School Years) follows the adventures of best friends Sophie and Agatha at The School for Good and Evil, an enchanted institution where children are trained to become fairytale heroes or villains, respectively. The second trilogy (The Camelot Years) follows Agatha and her true love, King Tedros, ascending to the role of Queen and King of the legendary kingdom, Camelot, and Sophie re-forming Evil into a new image. The final book in the original series was released on June 2, 2020, with the first book in a prequel series debuting in 2022. A film adaptation by Netflix was released on October 19, 2022.

== Summary ==
=== The School Years ===
==== Premise ====
For the last 200 years, every four years, two children are kidnapped from the village of Gavaldon. Usually, one child is beautiful and good-hearted, and the other is hideous and villainous. The kidnapper, referred to as "the School Master," kidnaps them to the School for Good and Evil in the surrounding Endless Woods, where they are trained to become fairy tale heroes and villains. The townspeople figure this out by seeing many of the kidnapped children in story books, that arrive mysteriously at Mr Deauville's bookshop, such as Grace and Enya, who were the first children to be taken.

==== The School for Good & Evil (2013) ====
Beautiful Sophie dreams of attending the School for Good, desperate to escape her dreary village life and become a princess, find true love, and fulfil her dreams. Meanwhile, her best friend Agatha, who lives on Grave's Hill— is withdrawn, and not stereotypically pretty, but deemed the perfect candidate for the School for Evil. On the night of the kidnapping, Sophie does everything in her power to get taken, where Agatha does everything in her power to stop it, resulting in them both being kidnapped by a shadowy black figure known as The School Master, and dragged into the Endless Woods. They are seemingly dropped into the wrong schools by a enormous bird: Sophie to the School for Evil, becoming a "Never", and Agatha to the School for Good, becoming an "Ever". At the Welcoming Ceremony, Sophie becomes smitten with King Arthur's son, Tedros of Camelot, who also takes notice of her. Agatha, however, only wants to go home with her best friend. After Sophie is humiliated, the two sneak into the School Master's Tower and beg to be sent home, but the Storian, an enchanted fountain pen that writes all the fairy tales like Jack and the Beanstalk, Cinderella, and more, instead begins their fairy tale. The School Master tells them to return home, they must solve a riddle, "What does Good have but Evil never will have?" The two girls realise that the answer could be true love's kiss.

Thus, Sophie must kiss Tedros, who she believes to be her true love, to prove they are in the wrong schools and go home.

Sophie and Agatha work together to court him, with Agatha mogrifying (magically turning into an animal) into a cockroach, and whispering words to Sophie. Before Tedros is to kiss Sophie and send the two girls home, she rebuts him, as she does not desire a quiet life in Gavaldon. Though the two attempt to maintain an Ever/Never relationship, in the Trial by Tale, a violent competition between the two schools, Tedros denies Sophie after she refuses to save him out of selfishness and learning about Agatha's role in their relationship. Sophie recognizes that she and Agatha are each indeed in the correct school. She grows bitter as she learns Agatha is her Nemesis, whom she must kill in her fairy tale to be happy, and who grows stronger as she grows weaker. Despondent over the loss of her best friend, Agatha seeks the assistance of Professor Dovey, Cinderella's fairy godmother aka The Dean of the School for Good, who helps Agatha to see the beauty within herself.

Sophie begins her final transformation into evil when Tedros asks Agatha to be his princess. Sophie loses, and then forsakes, her perfect beauty and attacks the School for Good. During the battle, Sophie learns the School Master is evil, and the reason Good always wins in every fairy tale is because the Storian is making up for a terrible crime. The School Master killed his own brother, who stood for Good, which broke the balance between Good and Evil. To repair this, the Storian forces every story to end with Good’s victory. He believes that Sophie is his true love, and her kiss will restore Evil's glory by proving the riddle he provided her with was wrong, and thereby achieving "Never After", Evil's version of the famous "Ever After".

However, Sophie denies him after realizing only hate in his kiss, and sacrifices herself to save Agatha, who kisses her, reviving her. The two return home, ending their fairy tale while Tedros is left alone.

==== A World Without Princes (2014) ====
Agatha and Sophie have settled back into their old lives in Gavaldon. Agatha misses Tedros and secretly wishes for him. This triggers a wave of mysterious attacks on Sophie, which threaten the entire village and cause the two girls to be run out of town. They make their way back to the School for Good and Evil, only to find it had become the School for Girls and Boys upon their departure. With Sophie and Agatha's fairy tale ending in them finding love in each other, the balance of good and evil has shifted into the balance of boys and girls.

At the School for Boys, Tedros is seeking revenge upon Sophie for supposedly stealing his true love. At the School for Girls, former Evil history teacher Evelyn Sader, who was banned from the schools years before and believed she was the School Master's true love, is now Dean. Agatha sneaks into the School for Boys to see Tedros in the School Master's Tower, believing Sophie is once again turning into a witch. Agatha releases the Storian, who erases "The End" from her storybook. Before the two can embrace and send her home, Sophie, who secretly followed the two, shoots a hot-pink spell between them. Sophie and Agatha flee, and, believing the princess and witch had together conspired to kill him, Tedros demands a Trial by Tale between the two schools. Should the School for Boys win, both girls will be killed.

Agatha, believing it was Tedros who shot the spell, apologizes to Sophie and expresses her desire to go home. Sophie takes a potion to turn into a boy for three days so she can search for the Storian, which has seemingly disappeared. She grows close to Tedros under the guise of being Filip of Mount Honora, and Tedros expresses his fondness for having such a loyal friend. The two enter the Trial by Tale together.

Now alone in the School for Girls, Agatha realizes that Sophie had followed her to the School for Boys. Fully convinced Sophie is Evil, she sneaks into the Trial by Tale. She locates Tedros and Sophie after another student has been killed and reveals Sophie's identity to Tedros, accusing her of being a witch and responsible for the death and brewing war between the two schools.

After Agatha denies Sophie's plea's for forgiveness and kisses Tedros, Sophie is almost sent back to Gavaldon. However, Evelyn Sader arrives, and prevents the Storian from finishing the story. Sader reveals she conjured the symptoms which Agatha believed were signs Sophie was once again becoming Evil. Sophie is tricked into kissing the School Master when he pretends to be her deceased mother, promising that if she kisses him, her mother will come back to life. The School Master is then transformed into a 16 year old boy by the name of Rafal. Agatha and Tedros are returned to Gavaldon, with the fate of Sophie and the Endless Woods unclear.

==== The Last Ever After (2015) ====
In the wake of Sophie and the School Master's kiss, Evil has been shown capable of love and "Never After", and all the previous fairy tale villains are resurrected as zombies and given a second chance at their fairy tales. They quickly hunt down their heroes and murder them, weakening the shield between the world of Readers (those who do not know the fairy tales are real) and the world of fairy tales, threatening the existence of both. With the shield weakening, the sun begins to melt. After leaving Gavaldon, Agatha and Tedros rescue Sophie and recover Excalibur, which they need to destroy a ring Rafal (the School Master) gave Sophie that transforms her soul into the deepest Evil and keeps him immortal. Sophie refuses and returns to Rafal; the two sides begin to prepare for a war on the night the sun will melt completely. During the war, another hero, Cinderella, is killed, and the shield between Gavaldon and the Woods disappears. However, when all hope is lost, Agatha convinces Sophie to destroy her ring, killing Rafal. Afterwards, Sophie becomes the Dean of the School for Evil, feeling content with her new life; Agatha and Tedros arrive at Camelot, seeking to restore it to its former glory.

=== The Camelot Years ===
Three books in the series School for Good and Evil focusing on a new adventure featuring new and old characters but a much more evil villain. The books included in the Camelot years are Quests for Glory, a Crystal of Time, and One True King.

==== Quests for Glory (2017) ====
The School for Good and Evil students set out on their required fourth-year quests. For their quests, Agatha and Tedros must try and return Camelot to its former splendour as queen and king. Tedros is told to take out the sword, Excalibur, which is embedded in a stone so that he can become the king. But even after trying weeks and months, he cannot pull it out. The issues Tedros is having becoming king affect his and Agatha's relationship, and his opinion of her begins to sour. Dean Sophie seeks to mould Evil in her image for her quest. When a mysterious villain known as "the Snake" emerges, terrorising the land the old friends must work together to save the Endless Woods. A man named Rhian arrives to aid in the fight, who Sophie becomes immediately smitten with. He is the biggest aid in helping Camelot after the Snakes attacks, and eventually wins over everyone except for Agatha. Agatha's suspicions grow, but Sophie is taken by Rhian, and Tedros refuses to listen to her, who thinks of Rhian like a brother in a way "Agatha would never understand." Rhian is revealed to be in cahoots with the Snake and takes over Camelot, after easily removing Excalibur from the stone. He calls for Tedros' execution, and for Sophie to rule at his side as his queen.

==== A Crystal of Time (2019) ====
A false king has claimed the throne of Camelot, sentenced Tedros to death, and forced Sophie to be his queen. Only Agatha manages to escape. Agatha and the students at the School for Good and Evil must find a way to restore Tedros to his throne and save Camelot before all of their fairy tales come to a lethal end. Tedros reclaims Excalibur, while Sophie witnesses Rhian and his brother Japeth fighting, with Japeth killing Rhian and assuming his identity. Agatha finds out that her cat, Reaper, is the king of gnomes, and his army helps to find the evil Japeth.

==== One True King (2020) ====
To prove he is the true King of Camelot, Tedros must pass three tests set by his late father, King Arthur. Pitted against him is the pretender king Japeth, who has all of the Woods on his side. Staying undercover, Tedros travels the Endless Woods with Agatha, Sophie, and his friends from the School for Good & Evil in a race to pass his father's tests and save the Endless Woods from Japeth's domination. Then they find out that both of the twins were not King Arthur's sons; they were the sons of the School Master and Evelyn Sader. This also solves the doubt about why Japeth is called R.J. because his full name is Rafal Japeth. Rhian pulled out the sword because Arthur's eldest son was Chaddick who was killed by Rafal. Chaddick was the son of Lady Gremelaine and Arthur. And Rhian had a scrap of fabric that held Chaddick's blood on himself, which enabled him to take the sword. But eventually, Tedros challenges Japeth to try and re-pull Excalibur out of the stone. Initially, it doesn't work because Japeth still has the fabric. Then Agatha incinerates the fabric, Tedros pulls out the sword and beheads Japeth. In the end, everyone lives happily ever after: Sophie ends up with Hort, and Agatha and Tedros marry at the School for Good and Evil.

=== Prequel series ===
==== Rise of the School for Good and Evil (2022) ====
The twin School Masters, Rafal and Rhian, have ruled the School for Good and Evil for many years in harmony. After a streak of Good victories, however, Rafal, the Evil School Master decides to try and even the scales. The attempts drive the brothers apart, creating a rift that threatens the balance of Good and Evil in the Endless Woods. Rafal realizes that he is the Good brother and Rhian is the Evil one, but not before Rhian's Dean James Hook takes several students to kill the evil Peter Pan. Released in 2022.

==== Fall of the School for Good and Evil (2023) ====
The sequel and conclusion to Rise of the School for Good and Evil, released in May 2023. Rhian and Rafal both lay separate claims to the School while Peter Pan attempts to kill them both. After a long and arduous battle, Peter is killed by the Storian, while Rhian and Rafal go to confront it on who will be the School Master. Rhian kills Rafal upon seeing the Storian seemingly draw Rafal's face, but realizes the Storian meant for Rhian to be School Master afterwards. This reveals that Rhian, not Rafal, was the School Master seen throughout the series, Rhian had taken his brother's name in The Last Ever After, and that the Rhian and Japeth from The Camelot Years are Rhian's kids, not Rafal's.

== Conception ==
When Soman Chainani was younger, he did not have access to cable, the Internet, or video games; he only had a TV and VHS tapes of Walt Disney Animation Studios's films, many of which were based on classic fairy tales. At university, the difference between the original stories and Disney's versions captivated him when he took a class about the history of fairy tales.

Disney took the original fairy tales — filled with complexity and darkness and often horror — and essentially pasteurized them to make them more entertaining, and arguably more "appropriate" for children. I'm always struck by the fact that the original Grimms' stories often spoke loudest to older teenaged readers, while Disney tries to peddle these tales to a younger audience, often by changing the core of the story.

— Soman Chainani

Chainani first began working on The School for Good and Evil in June 2010. Revisions, retellings, and mash-ups of fairy tales had gained popularity at the time. Works often included several cliches that had heavily influenced the portrayals Good and Evil, Boys and Girls, and Old and Young, as well as tropes that recurred in the portrayal of antagonists. Chainani, however, wanted to focus on something more primal: a brand-new fairy tale that was "just as unleashed and unhinged" as the older tales. Moreover, it would redevelop the fairy tale genre while acknowledging its past. In this way, by creating his own series, he aimed to dispel the commonly held stereotypes and deliver an original tale devoid of cliches.

Chainani initially planned the series as three trilogies: The School Years, The Camelot Years, and The New Class.

== Publication ==
When he first began working on The School for Good and Evil, Chainani expected it to become a treatment for a screenplay he could sell. He later realized, however, that "it had to be novels". Producer Jane Startz, who Chainani worked with on an adaptation of The Pushcart War, agreed with this sentiment, squashing any doubt Chainani had. Startz negotiated the deal for the trilogy with publishing company HarperCollins after that. According to its editorial director—Phoebe Yeh—she "knew in [her] gut that [the company] were going to have a winner" from the novel's first sentence, being "blown away" by the originality, premise, characters, lore, and language. Yeh's enjoyment encouraged her to acquire the trilogy from Startz.

The School for Good and Evil was first published on May 14, 2013, in a 150,000-copy printing. In the United Kingdom, it was released on June 6 of the same year. The second novel, A World Without Princes, was published on April 15, 2014, while the third, The Last Ever After, was published a year later on July 21. This was followed by the release of the fourth and fifth books—Quests for Glory and A Crystal of Time—on September 19, 2017, and March 5, 2019, respectively. HarperCollins published final novel, One True King, on June 2, 2020.

== Reception ==
Critical reception for the first book in the series has been positive, and the book has received praise from The Guardian and the Miami Herald.

=== Awards ===
- Waterstone's Children's Book Prize for Best Fiction for 5-12 (2014, nominee for The School for Good and Evil)

== Impact ==
The School for Good and Evil has amassed a significant international fan following. As of 2022, the series has been translated into over 32 languages and sold more than 3.5 million copies worldwide. According to Vogue India, the series has become a "mainstay" on The New York Times Best Seller list.

== Adaptation ==
Shortly after the first book's publication, Universal Pictures acquired rights to adapt the first novel into film. In 2020, Netflix announced it would take over and release a film adaptation of the novel, directed by Paul Feig. Filming took place at The Belfast Harbour Studios in Northern Ireland. The adaptation was released in 2022, debuting at #1 on Netflix in over 80 countries.
