= Soman Chainani =

American author and filmmaker

- Chainani on his 2026 YOUNG WORLD tour.
- Education: Harvard University; Columbia University
- Occupations: Author, filmmaker
- Writing career
- Genres: children's literature, fantasy
- Notable work: The School for Good and Evil series
- Website: somanchainani.com

Soman Chainani is an American author, best known for writing the children's book series The School for Good and Evil. Some of his work has been adapted to films.

== Early life and education ==
Chainani grew up in Key Biscayne, Florida, where his family was one of the few of Indian descent. He attended Harvard University, where he graduated with a degree in English and American Literature in 2001. He came out as gay in his senior year at college. After graduating from Harvard, he attended Columbia University, where he participated in their MFA film program.

== Writing career ==
Chainani's series, The School for Good and Evil, debuted on the New York Times Best Seller list, has sold more than 4 million copies, been translated into 35 languages across 6 continents, and has been adapted into a major motion picture from Netflix that debuted at #1 in over 80 countries.

His other books in the School for Good and Evil series are A World Without Princes, The Last Ever After, Quests for Glory, A Crystal of Time, and One True King – have all debuted on the New York Times Bestseller List as well.

His book of retold fairytales, Beasts and Beauty, was released on September 21, 2021, to wide acclaim, with Kirkus Reviews calling the collection "expertly crafted... evoking the wonder, terror, and magic of the fantasy realms." Beasts & Beauty was an instant New York Times bestseller, Soman's seventh New York Times bestseller in a row, and is slated to be a limited television series from Sony 3000, with Soman writing and executive producing. Together, Chainani's books have been on the New York Times Bestseller List for 50 weeks.

His book, Rise of the School for Good and Evil was released on May 31, 2022, to high acclaim and The New York Times Bestseller list. Publishers Weekly described it as "an episodic, adventurous fantasy offering." A sequel, Fall of the School for Good and Evil was released in May 2023.

In 2026, Soman released his first original novel since The School for Good and Evil series—a global political thriller called Young World, about a 17 year-old who leads a youth revolution and is installed as President of the United States. The book was an instant New York Times Bestseller, USA Today Bestseller, and Indie List Bestseller. Variety reported that Eric Schultz, senior advisor to former President Barack Obama, is producing the adaptation of Young World for television.

== Bibliography ==
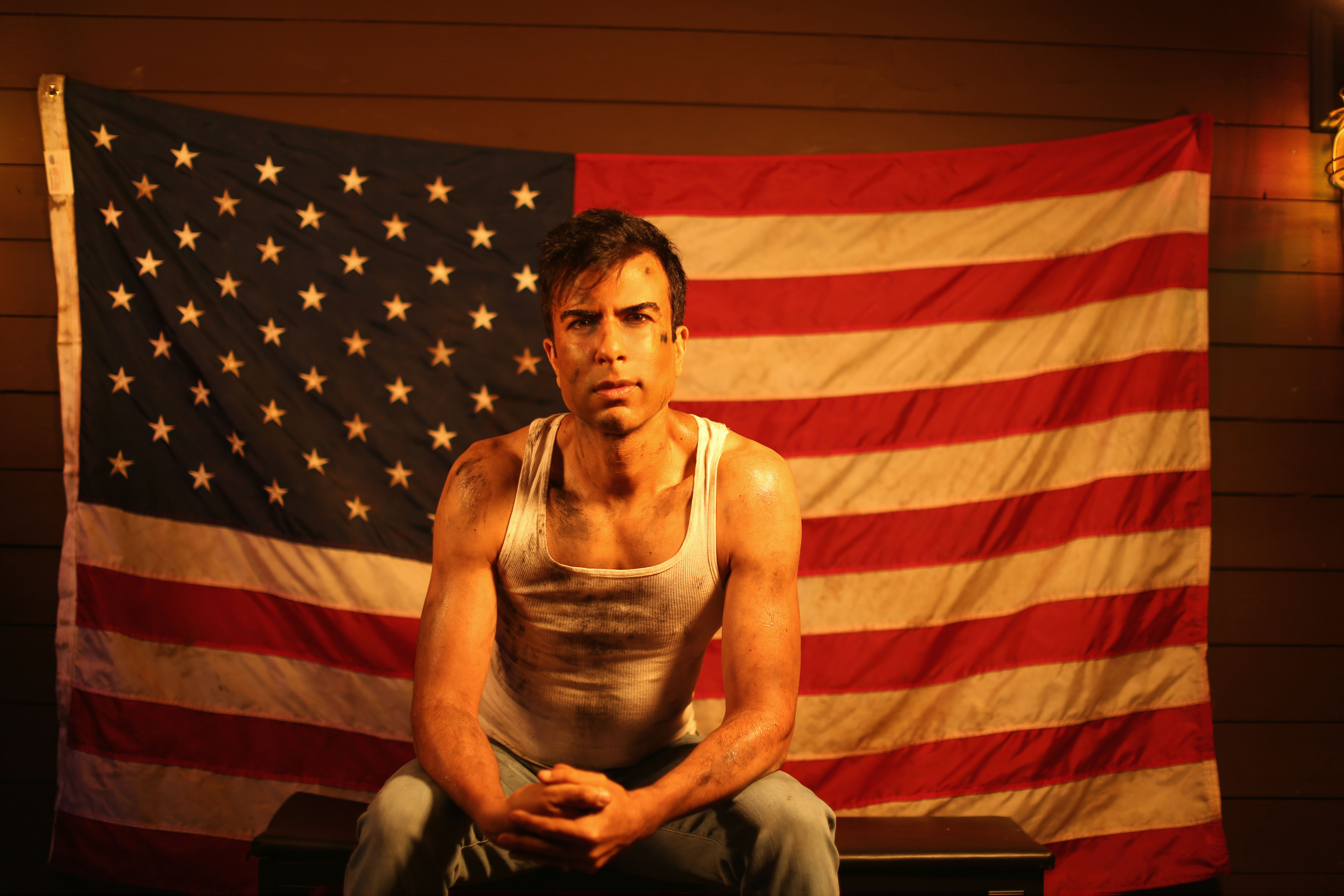
Chainani at a promotional shoot for his political thriller Young World.

=== The School for Good and Evil ===
The School Years

- The School for Good and Evil (2013)
- A World Without Princes (2014)
- The Last Ever After (2015)
  - The Ever Never Handbook (companion) (2016)

The Camelot Years

- Quests for Glory (2017)
- A Crystal of Time (2019)
- One True King (2020)

Prequels

- Rise of the School for Good and Evil (2022)
- Fall of the School for Good and Evil (2023)

=== Short stories ===
- "Flying Lessons" in Flying Lessons & Other Stories, edited by Ellen Oh (2017)
- "Gwen and Art and Lance" in Because You Love to Hate Me: 13 Tales of Villainy, edited by Amerie (2017)

=== Other titles ===
- Beasts and Beauty: Dangerous Tales (2021)
- Young World (2026)

== Awards ==
The School for Good and Evil

- New York Times Bestseller
- ABA Indie List Bestseller
- Waterstone's Children's Book Prize for Best Fiction for 5–12 (2014, nominee for The School for Good and Evil)
- A Barnes & Noble Best Book of 2013
- A Books-a-Million Best Book of 2013
- Entertainment Weekly PopWatch Pick
- Children's Choice Reading List Selection
- Goodreads Choice Semi-finalist (Best Children's Book)
- IndieNext Pick

A World Without Princes

- New York Times Bestseller
- ABA Indie List Bestseller
- Goodreads Choice Finalist (Best Children's Book)

The Last Ever After

- New York Times Bestseller
- ABA Indie List Bestseller
- A Barnes & Noble Best Book of 2015
- Goodreads Choice Runner-up (Best Children's Book)

== Filmography ==
- 2006: Davy and Stu (short)
- 2007: Kali Ma (short), Boys Life 6
- 2022: The School for Good and Evil (Executive Producer)

== Censorship ==
In December 2025, the Lukashenko regime added Beasts and Beauty to the List of printed publications containing information materials, the distribution of which could harm the national interests of Belarus.
