= Quests for Glory =

2017 novel by Soman Chainani

- Author: Soman Chainani
- Illustrator: Iacopo Bruno
- Cover artist: Iacopo Bruno
- Language: English
- Series: The School for Good and Evil
- Genre: Fairytale fantasy
- Publisher: HarperCollins
- Publication date: September 19, 2017
- Publication place: United States
- Preceded by: The Last Ever After
- Followed by: A Crystal of Time
- Website: schoolforgoodandevil.com/books/quests-for-glory

Quests for Glory is a 2017 fairytale fantasy novel by Soman Chainani. The fourth novel in The School for Good and Evil series as well as the first in the Camelot Years trilogy, the novel details the students of the School for Good and Evil's Quests for Glory, which they must complete to graduate. After their quests go horribly wrong, Sophie and Agatha reunite to defend the Endless Woods against a "snake".

== Plot ==
In their fourth year, the students of the School for Good and Evil are sent on Quests for Glory, which they must complete to graduate. Tedros and Agatha quests are to bring Camelot back to its former glory as king and queen, while Sophie becomes Dean of the School for Evil, seeking to mould evil in her own image. Tedros is unable to become king as he cannot pull Excalibur from a stone. Suddenly, Sophie and the coven, Hester, Anadil, and Dot, seem to be failing, though they are, seemingly not shortly after Chaddick's, Tedros' first knight, death. Dean of the School for Good, Professor Dovey, gives them a new quest to stop the attacks on the Endless Woods. The group decides to set off with Hort and Agatha, who arrives shortly after. Suddenly, the Storian begins writing a new story, highlighting the importance of somebody named Nicola.

During their journey, Agatha tells the story of the Lion and the Snake, where a lion and a snake fought for the throne of Camelot. Eventually, they brought an eagle to decide, who chooses the snake, since he promised the eagle freedom. However, the eagle is attacked by the snake and is saved by the lion. The snake warns the lion he will return. The group is captured at Jaunt Jolie where Sophie and Agatha are taken to a "snake" covered in knife-like "eels". He reveals his own pen which tells stories from villains' perspectives. The girls later find their friends and leaders at Four Point. They are saved by a mysterious "lion" who kisses Sophie.

Back at the castle, Tedros chooses his mother over his steward, Lady Gremlaine, prompting her to leave. Later, at a meeting, Tedros receives a letter from the "lion" to meet him at Sherwood Forest. During their journey, they find Lady Gremlaine to be killed, as well as Lancelot. At Nottingham, they capture the snake who escapes using Kei, a former Camelot guard, who tricked Dot into giving him the keys.

Later, the snake threatens an attack. While Rhian has growing popularity, Tedros is unpopular among Camelot and asks Rhian to let him kill the snake himself. The snake attacks and Tedros fights him until he is weak, but is weakened as well. Instead, Agatha prevents him from fighting and commands Rhian to kill the snake. After killing the snake, Rhian proposes to Sophie, who accepts, and asks Tedros for the key to the case which is being used to protect Excalibur. Agatha finds out that the snake and Rhian have actually been working together and attempts to warn Tedros, who realises it after it's too late. Rhian pulls Excalibur from the stone, claiming to be Arthur's eldest son. Tedros and his friends, with the exception of Sophie, who is marrying Rhian, and Agatha, who is on the run, are thrown into the dungeons.

== Themes and styles ==
NPR noted the "truth and lies" theme in the book as well as the similarity to J. K. Rowling's Harry Potter series. Chainani said he tried to replace the "warm safety" of the Harry Potter series with instability and uncertainty to make his readers "feel slightly uneasy the entire way through."

== Background ==
Chainani began writing the book in Winter and Spring 2016–2017 after the 2016 United States presidential election. He stated the characters would be more sophisticated and intense than the original trilogy since they were growing up. The book was published on September 19, 2017, by HarperCollins.

== Promotion ==
On June 14, 2017, a trailer was released, introducing the Camelot Years. Chainani cast 16 actors to portray the characters in an introduction to the characters, including Zoe Wilson as Agatha, Kyle Kowalewski as Tedros and Victoria Minnich as Sophie. The video was published on September 23, 2017, on YouTube by EverNever TV.

== Reception ==
Kirkus Reviews complimented Iacopo Bruno's illustrations, humor and horror.

== Sequels ==
The book was followed by the two other books of the Camelot Years trilogy, A Crystal of Time and One True King, published on March 5, 2019, and June 2, 2020.
