= Xander Speight =

Australian actor

- Born: 25 March 1996 (age 30)
- Occupations: Actor, writer
- Years active: 2009-present

Xander James Speight (born 25 March 1996) is an Australian actor. He is best known for his role as Parker in the ABC 3 TV series Worst Year of My Life Again.

== Filmography ==
=== Film ===
Year	Title	Role
2016	Frankie	Blake
2017	The Lucifer Killings	Viktor Golovkin

=== Television ===
Year	Title	Role	Notes
2009	Prank Patrol (Australian TV series)	Actor	Season 1, Episode 7
2013	Neighbours	Justin De Goldi	Episode 6643
2014	Worst Year of My Life Again	Parker	Supporting Role

== Awards ==
Year	Awards Show	Category	Work	Result
2014	47th Awgie Awards	Children's Television (C Classification)	Worst Year of My Life Again	Nominated
2015	AACTA Awards	Best Children's Television Series	Worst Year of My Life Again	Nominated
2015	Logie Awards	Most Outstanding Children's Program	Worst Year of My Life Again	Nominated
