= The School for Good and Evil (film) =

2022 fantasy drama film

- Release poster
- Directed by: Paul Feig
- Screenplay by: David Magee; Paul Feig
- Based on: The School for Good and Evil by Soman Chainani
- Produced by: Joe Roth; Jeffrey Kirschenbaum; Laura Fischer; Paul Feig; Jane Startz
- Starring: Sophia Anne Caruso; Sofia Wylie; Earl Cave; Laurence Fishburne; Michelle Yeoh; Jamie Flatters; Kit Young; Peter Serafinowicz; Rob Delaney; Mark Heap; Patti LuPone; Rachel Bloom; Cate Blanchett; Kerry Washington; Charlize Theron
- Cinematography: John Schwartzman
- Edited by: Brent White
- Music by: Theodore Shapiro
- Production companies: Roth/Kirschenbaum Films; Feigco Entertainment; Jane Startz Productions
- Distributed by: Netflix
- Release dates: October 18, 2022 (Regency Village Theatre); October 19, 2022
- Running time: 147 minutes
- Country: United States
- Language: English

The School for Good and Evil is a 2022 American fantasy film directed by Paul Feig from a screenplay he co-wrote with David Magee, based on the 2013 novel of the same name by Soman Chainani. The film stars an ensemble cast led by Sophia Anne Caruso as Sophie and Sofia Wylie as Agatha, two best friends who are sent to the Schools for Good and Evil. After their fortunes are seemingly reversed, their friendship is put to the test.

The film's development began in 2013, when the rights to the novel were acquired by Roth/Kirschenbaum Films and Jane Startz Productions, with Universal Pictures initially set to release the film. After the project languished in development hell, Netflix took over in 2017, and Feig was hired to direct three years later. Principal photography took place in Northern Ireland between January and July 2021.

The School for Good and Evil was released on October 19, 2022, by Netflix. The film received generally negative reviews from critics, who criticized the narrative and storytelling, but praised its cast and visuals. It was Netflix's most-viewed film during the week of its release.

== Plot ==
Twin brothers Rhian and Rafal founded the School for Good and Evil to train fairy tale heroes (called "Evers") and villains (called "Nevers") respectively. Dissatisfied with evil's constant submission to good, Rafal attacked Rhian using blood magic. They both seemingly fell off a cliff.

Years later, in a village called Gavaldon, best friends Sophie and Agatha learn about the legendary school from the local bookshop owner. While Agatha is skeptical, the fairy tale-obsessed Sophie dreams of escaping ordinary life and becoming a princess. Nights later, Sophie attempts to run away from Gavaldon in secret. When Agatha finds out and tries to intervene, a giant stymph snatches them both, flying them to the magical School for Good and Evil. To their dismay, however, Agatha is dropped at the School for Good, while Sophie is delivered to the School for Evil. Agatha protests, wishing to return to Gavaldon, while Sophie insists she belongs in Good.

Both girls seek out School Master Rhian and the magical Storian pen. He says he will only allow Sophie to switch schools if she can prove herself an Ever by attaining true love's kiss. She casts Prince Tedros, the son of King Arthur, as her true love and enlists Agatha's help.

Agatha and Sophie struggle in their respective classes and are ostracized by their peers. Though Agatha is vocally critical of Good's superficiality, Ever Dean Clarissa Dovey argues her sense of empathy makes her the first true princess in a long time. Meanwhile, Rafal manifests as a wasp swarm and defends Sophie from another student's attack. Never Dean Leonora Lesso interprets this as Sophie's unique potential for winning a victory for Evil, something thought impossible for centuries.

When Sophie tries to get close to Tedros, Lesso cuts her hair to break her spirit. Under Rafal's influence, Sophie undergoes a radical change in appearance and personality, gaining the favor of the Nevers and rising to the unofficial position of leader of Evil's student body. Though she diverges from Agatha, the latter still tries to aid Sophie by using magic to bring her and Tedros together. An Ever and a Never being together causes chaos; Rhian determines a "Trial by Tale" to settle the issue. During the Trial, Sophie ends up proving inept in defending herself and Tedros, prompting Agatha save him in her stead. This results in him rejecting Sophie for choosing self-preservation over him, with the prince starting a relationship with Agatha.

Convinced by Rafal that Agatha is her enemy, Sophie accepts his offer of blood magic. She incapacitates Dovey, Lesso, and the other school staff, and crashes the Evers' Ball, now physically transformed into a hag. Sophie threatens Agatha and goads Tedros into attacking the School for Evil. However, by attacking, the Evers break the law of "Good defends, Evil attacks", resulting in the Nevers and Evers magically switching appearances and a battle breaking out.

Sophie attempts to seek revenge on Rhian, who reveals himself to have been Rafal all along; he survived the fall and killed Rhian, assuming his identity and manipulating Good's stories to weaken it from within. He then proposes he and Sophie rule together, declaring her his true love. As they kiss, both Schools start collapsing, horrifying Sophie. When Agatha arrives, Rafal tries to stab her with the Storian, which he had forced to write the story it has written. Sophie pushes Agatha out of the way and takes the fatal hit; her sacrifice undoes both Rafal's spell and already written fate on Agatha, saving everyone. Agatha, with a dying Sophie and Tedros's help, kills Rafal with Excalibur. She then kisses the dying Sophie goodbye; this demonstration of true love revives her.

The Evers and Nevers reconcile, and the restored school staff decide to again unite the two schools into one. A portal to Gavaldon opens, and Agatha kisses Tedros before crossing over with Sophie, returning to their old lives. However, the two now use their powers to defend themselves from bullies. Unknown to them, a portal opens piercing the veil between worlds and an arrow flies through, with Tedros pleading he needs Agatha; the Storian then states that "this is only the beginning".

== Cast ==
- Sophia Anne Caruso as Sophie, a beautiful girl who dreams of becoming a princess
  - Ella Hehir as young Sophie
- Sofia Wylie as Agatha, Sophie's best friend who is labeled a witch by the villagers
  - Mahli Perry as young Agatha
- Kit Young as Rafal/Rhian, the twin School Masters of Evil and Good respectively
  - Laurence Fishburne as School Master Rhian, Rafal's disguise as his brother in his old years
- Michelle Yeoh as Prof. Emma Anemone, the Beautification teacher
- Jamie Flatters as Tedros, the Prince of Camelot
- Peter Serafinowicz as Yuba, the Surviving in Fairy Tales teacher
- Rob Delaney as Stefan, Sophie's father
- Mark Heap as Professor Bilious Manley, the Uglification teacher
- Patti LuPone as Mrs. Deauville, the Gavaldon bookshop owner
- Rachel Bloom as Honora, Sophie's stepmother
- Cate Blanchett as the voice of the Storian
- Kerry Washington as Prof. Clarissa Dovey, the Dean of the School for Good
- Charlize Theron as Lady Leonora Lesso, the Dean of the School for Evil
  - Abigail Stones as young Leonora

Additionally, Earl Cave appears as Hort, while Freya Parks portrays Hester, the leader of the School for Evil's coven; Demi Isaac Oviawe and Kaitlyn Akinpelumi appear as Hester's sidekicks, Anadil and Dot. Holly Sturton, Briony Scarlett, Rosie Graham, Emma Lau, and Chinenye Ezeudu portray Evergirls Beatriz, Reena, Millicent, Kiko, and Chinen, respectively. Mark Charles appears as Eric; Harvey Scrimshaw as Harvid; and Ali Khan as Chaddick. Stephanie Siadatan plays Vanessa, Sophie's mother. Joelle plays a character of her namesake, while Ally Cubb plays Gregor.

== Production ==
=== Development and writing ===
In 2011, studios reportedly considered a film adaptation based on The School for Good and Evil series. Shortly after the publication of the first book of the series in 2013, Roth Films partnered with Jane Startz Productions to acquire rights to produce a film based on the novel. Universal Pictures won the auction in a seven-figure deal for book and scriptwriting fees. Roth, Startz and Palak Patel were appointed producers. Chainani and Malia Scotch Marmo were hired to write the screenplay, with the former writing the initial two drafts. In July 2015, Chainani stated he and Scotch Marmo finished writing the script.

After the film languished in development hell, Netflix purchased the rights with a new team that included David Magee and Laura Solon as screenwriters in 2017. The streaming service expressed interest in live-action family films since most family films were animated. Other studios frequently rejected big-budget productions because of the expenses or the risks of releasing a family film that was not based on preexisting intellectual property; however, Netflix's ambition to find films that appeal to all ages led it to buy those productions, such as The School for Good and Evil.

Paul Feig was offered a spot as director, but he was hesitant due to the film's contrasts with his style and unfamiliar genre. However, he reconsidered after he read the script, in which he enjoyed the characters, story, and opportunities for world-building. He was also interested in the relationships between the characters, as well as good and evil. Feig aimed to depict the lead characters' female friendship interestingly, as such relationships were often portrayed contentiously onscreen. Feig joined in 2020, with Roth, Jeffrey Kirschenbaum, Startz, Laura Fischer and Feig as producers, and Zack Roth, Patricia Riggen and Chainani as executive producers. Netflix was supportive of Feig's rewrites and changes.

Chainani said the film would be a "very different animal" from the book. Feig stated that he is "very against any movies where you have to know things before you go there". The scenes were retrofitted so that they would still be unique from the books, but in a way that would hopefully please the fans. They often had to examine certain passages very closely to ensure they were not just recreating clichés. While the novels are targeted towards young adults, Feig set out to create "an anti-Disney" film that, while reinterpreting fairy tales, also probed genuine issues and darkness. In the books, the students are in their mid-teenage years; Feig, however, believed The School for Good and Evil did not necessarily need to be set at a high school. In the film, the students are approximately 18 to 19 years old. As the film developed, the team required more money for various things; Netflix subsequently increased the budget.

=== Casting ===
Fiona Weir was appointed casting director. Actresses Sophia Anne Caruso and Sofia Wylie were cast in the roles of Sophie and Agatha, respectively. Caruso learned of The School for Good and Evil after a general meeting with Feig. The script was sent to her shortly after; Caruso was impressed by the writing. However, Feig's collaborative and optimistic attitude, as well as his acting experience, was what ultimately persuaded Caruso to join the cast. Wylie auditioned for Agatha through a series of self-tapes and a chemistry read with Caruso. Feig said she submitted the "most amazing audition" and wanted to cast her immediately. According to Caruso, Wylie was clearly "easy to talk to and friendly", with the two having "an immediate connection".

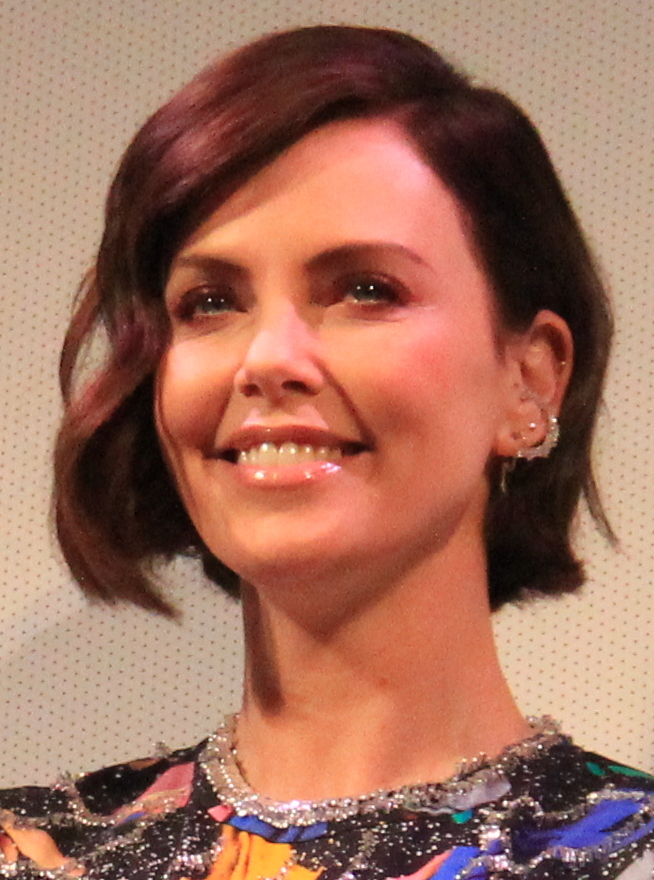
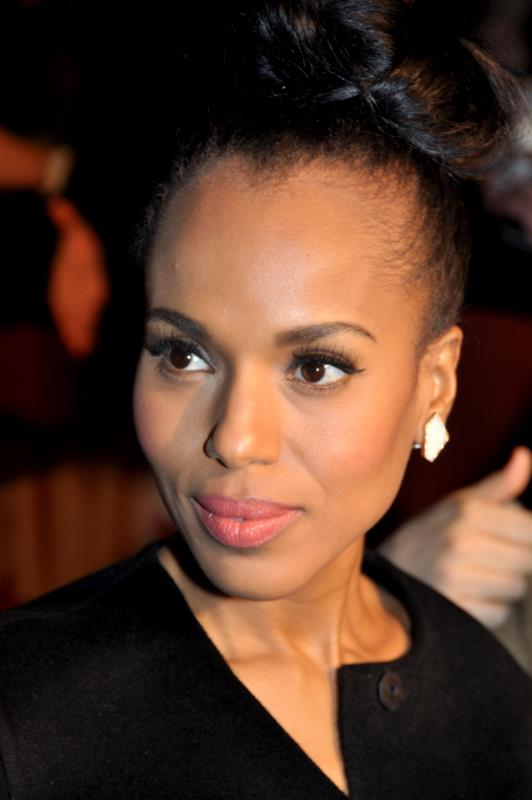
Charlize Theron (left) and Kerry Washington (right) were cast to portray Lady Lesso and Professor Dovey respectively.

After Charlize Theron had completed work on F9 (2021), Kirschenbaum spoke to her about portraying "a different kind" of villain. She previously acted in many fantasy films, such as Snow White and the Huntsman (2012). Feig, who had worked with her on Arrested Development (2005), expected her to decline the role due to The School for Good and Evil's similarities to her other films. However, Lady Lesso differed from her other roles as a teacher who relished evil, allowing Theron to "have much more fun in a way than some of those movies where you have to be very serious".

Feig had long sought to collaborate with Kerry Washington, but their schedules had never allowed it. He knew as soon as he read Professor Dovey's role that he wanted only Washington to play the part, partially due to her comedic skills. Compelled by the idea of working with Feig and Theron, Washington accepted. After reading The School for Good and Evil, she realized that Dovey was different from any character she had portrayed, being "so larger than life and filled with light, and [having] a lot of comedic beats". For the character's foundation, Washington made the decision to draw on real-life examples. She gave considerable thought to the archetype of fairy godmothers and finishing schools, as well as one of her instructors at Spence School, an all-girls school in New York that she had attended.

=== Design and sets ===
Feig did not want the film to look similar to the Harry Potter film series and thus chose Andy Nicholson as production designer. Due to Feig's dislike of green screens and hope for "the characters and the actors to be performing in that world so they become part of it", much of the scenery was constructed, including the Schools for Good and Evil. The two sound stages constructed at Belfast Harbour Studios played a crucial role in that. The only scenes that used green screens were those in the beginning and those including Rafal, since the skies had to be altered. The film's style takes inspiration from Art Nouveau, which Feig noticed while filming Spy (2015) in Budapest, Hungary. Feig stated that this avoided comparisons to other films, being "both garish and over the top". Nicholson subsequently incorporated elements from other architects, including Antoni Gaudí and Victor Horta, creating "this big melting point of design". The team was allowed to "take over" St Anne's Cathedral. During the two weeks they worked there, the crew transformed the area into "this big, almost sound-stage type space ... with so much detail".

=== Costumes ===
Over 800 costumes and 600 pairs of shoes were produced by more than 70 costumers. The costumes maintained the design's individuality and distinctiveness, with Reneé Kalfus and Feig designing them. For the creative team, it felt fitting that each character would bring their own sense of style and culture given that many of the characters are the children of well-known fairy tale characters. Feig said he allowed Kalfus creative freedom with this concept. The costumes were inspired by a variety of media, including classic fairy tales and Beyoncé. The actors were encouraged to contribute to their costumes. In particular, Theron wanted Lesso to have a tailored and severe silhouette; she also suggested the ginger hair and showed Feig various reference photos. Caruso discussed Sophie's evolution of style with Kalfus, including with "princessy" dresses and "potato sack" uniform at the School for Evil. She eventually transitions into punk glam costumes, which Caruso felt needed "such a specific type of hot that suits her fiery spirit". Wylie insisted on keeping her curly hair, wanting to show such hair can still be associated with princesses. (Note: Many films featured scenes where a girl with curly hair undergoes a "makeover" and emerges with straight hair. Wylie did not want that to serve as a model for how a princess should appear.) Professor Dovey's blond bouffant wig took seven weeks to produce, including one to create its color; designer Linda Villalobos chose its look to highlight her goodness and prevent her from looking evil, as well as demonstrate texture. The wolf characters are portrayed by men in suits wearing animatronic heads so the actors had something to act against.

=== Filming ===
According to Feig, filming on location was essential in order to avoid overusing special effects. Netflix was unable to shoot the production at its Shepperton Studios in Surrey, because it was too small; they decided to instead film at Northern Ireland for the first time. Feig selected its city Belfast as the filming location, as he had friends who had shot there, including production members from Game of Thrones (2011–2019). He also cited its close proximity to London, which would make travel between the two cities easy, though this was not the case due to the COVID-19 pandemic. The film was shot at several locations in Belfast, including Belfast Harbour Studios and Loop Film Studios. At the former, the full 125,000 sq ft (11,600 m^{2}) of the studio, workshop and office space was used. Derry was also considered as a filming location but was rejected for numerous reasons. Local sites The School for Good and Evil was filmed at include St Peter's Church; St Anne's Cathedral; Mount Stewart; Ulster Folk Museum; Clandeboye Estate; Woodburn Forest; Castle Archdale; and Antrim Road.

Production followed the British Film Commission safe working protocols due to the COVID-19 pandemic. Feig was particularly pleased to film at Big Dog Forest in Fermanagh, since he thought building such a place would be impossible. Some crew members tried to persuade him against filming there, (Note: Big Dog Forest is dense and deep, and the crew members thought it would be difficult to access.) but he insisted because the forest was unlike anything he had ever seen. In January 2021, it was reported filming had begun. The crew encountered difficulties with shooting on the first day, as it rained heavily, creating puddles of mud. Roughly 350 to 500 crew members worked on The School for Good and Evil, the majority of whom were locals. Filming wrapped at the end of July 2021.

=== Post-production ===
After the film wrapped, Feig began editing, with Erik Nordby as effects supervisor. The film's visual effects were provided by British companies DNEG, Framestore, and Cinesite. Feig hoped for the film's world to have a sense of realism, despite its magical aspects, which he tried to keep elemental; an example is the stymph. In the books, it is a bird made of bones that takes children to the Schools for Good and Evil. The team wanted it to be sentient while retaining its bones. They researched bird skeletons and decayed birds, studying the way the tissue and feathers stay on the bones, and the interactions of these three things. The team used computer-generated imagery to add expressions and emotions to the animatronic characters.

=== Music ===
The film's score was composed by Theodore Shapiro. Before the production began, Feig created a reel of visual ideas based on couture-inspired costumes and the reel was set to an indie rock song, which led Shapiro to set a sonic palette that "would have a youthful energy and point of view". Musically, the film required a huge orchestral score to be cinematic and epic, but Shapiro tried to keep the modern pop sensibilities alive. He combined a large orchestra with baroque harpsichords, medieval instruments, and modern music programming, to create an "epic pop" score. According to Shapiro, the medieval instruments such as recorders and frame drums, along with baroque harpischord and pipe organ, represented the 20th century sounds. Combining these with electronics, Shapiro wanted to convey the idea of timelessness by "making a big musical gumbo with all of these references colliding with one another".

== Marketing ==
Film marketer Lee Schroder served as The School for Good and Evil's publicist. In May 2021, three first-look images were posted on Washington, Theron and Feig's social medias, featuring the former two dressed in their respective roles. Hundreds of responses were posted on Twitter; many fans were impressed and conveyed desires for sequels. In June of that year, during Netflix's virtual fan event Geeked Week, the first teaser was released. It depicted a coven of witches walking towards the screen. The School for Good and Evil was announced as part of Netflix's 2022 film slate and appeared in a "movie preview" video.

In early June 2022, Netflix launched the film's teaser poster. That same month, a first-look teaser trailer for the film was released, while a panel featuring Wylie, Caruso, and the novel series' author Soman Chainani was held as part of Netflix's 2022 Geeked Week event. In late July 2022, the film's main poster was released. It highlights the schools' divide, with a split between the two that is emphasized through the color palettes. The following month, a novel tie-in was released, titled The School for Good and Evil: Movie Tie-in Edition. At the end of September, it appeared on bestseller lists by Canadian publications Toronto Star and The Globe and Mail.

== Release ==
The film was originally slated for release in Christmas 2017. In December 2020, Chainani stated that the film is set to be released in 2022, with a release for the latter half of the year being scheduled later. In June 2022, a fall release of September 2022 was announced. In late July 2022, Netflix announced the film's release date as October 21, 2022. The release date was moved up by two days in late August.

The School for Good and Evil had its world premiere at Regency Village Theatre in Los Angeles on October 18, 2022, before it became streamable worldwide the following day. It was also released in select theaters.

== Reception ==
=== Pre-release ===
Time listed The School for Good and Evil among the most anticipated films of 2022, while Empire named it one of the best films set to come out in 2022. Time, Teen Vogue, The Daily Beast, ABC News, and Entertainment Weekly also named it one of the most anticipated films of late 2022. The Deseret News listed it among Netflix's top four October films.

=== Critical reception ===
GamesRadar+, GoldDerby, and The Cinemaholic described reviews as "mixed", while Time and HuffPost said they were "mostly negative". According to The Independent, journalists were "quick to tear apart" the film. On the review aggregator website Rotten Tomatoes, 37% of 67 critics' reviews are positive, with an average rating of 4.9/10. The website's consensus reads: "The cast is game and the visuals are dazzling, but a deeply derivative narrative means The School for Good and Evil flunks on the storytelling front." Metacritic, which uses a weighted average, assigned the film a score of 30 out of 100, based on 18 critics, indicating "generally unfavorable" reviews.

Reviewers were critical of the film's length and worldbuilding. Various critics categorized it as "tedious", "exhaustingly long [and] overstuffed", a "slog", and a "migraine". RogerEbert.com's Christy Lemire found the worldbuilding "dense and not terribly compelling", while David Rooney of The Hollywood Reporter described The School for Good and Evil as a "madly over-plotted" film whose screenplay is full of "clutter". The Daily Telegraph writer Robbie Collin thought that it substituted worldbuilding with "unexplained jargon", and the Los Angeles Times deemed its explanations of fairy tales "tedious". Similarly, Mark Feeney of The Boston Globe and David Ehrlich of IndieWire called the film "overly busy yet consistently inert" and "aggressively convoluted", respectively. Many reviewers thought The School for Good and Evil's story would work better as a television series, and they unfavorably compared the film to the Harry Potter and Descendants film series.

The film's design received positive reviews, with CNN's David Lowry dubbing it "appropriately fairy-tale". Critics called the costumes "dazzling", "first-rate", and "sumptuous". Lemire singled out the production design as "enjoyably over-the-top". However, the use of computer-generated imagery received criticism; Ehrlich said that the "flagrantly foul" special effects contributed to a tacky quality. Several journalists took issue with the action sequences, many of which features CGI. Rooney found the Evers Ball was "too busy and messy to follow".

Critics praised Wylie and Caruso's performances; Lemire said they add a sense of authenticity in Sophie and Agatha's friendship. Ehrlich and Bob Strauss of the San Francisco Chronicle praised Wylie as "warm and effortlessly regal" and moving, respectively. The two reviewers also lauded Caruso's performance; Ehrlich said she had "that Broadway shine", and Strauss said her portrayal of Sophie's loss of moral direction was "deliciously fun". However, many journalists found the supporting cast to be underused. According to Lemire, Yeoh and Fishburne have "frustratingly little to do" and the film "squanders the talents" of Delaney and LuPone. Likewise, Rooney deemed Yeoh to be "embarrassingly under-utilized".

In December 2022, Donald Clarke and Tara Brady of The Irish Times named The School for Good and Evil the ninth-worst film of the year, saying: "Feig deliver[ed] something that looked no less vulgar than the average Des Moines department store window." Metacritic ranked it the fifteenth-worst-rated film of 2022, citing reviewers' criticisms of it as "a campy, underdeveloped, and overstuffed Harry Potter knock-off that was a slog to sit through".

=== Audience reception ===
Many people had conflicting opinions on The School for Good and Evil, especially those who had read the book. The Independent stated audience responses were "considerably kinder" than those of critics, but still "resolutely mixed". Some thought the film "did everything it set out to do". Others found fault with the writing, such as the deviations from the book's plot, and disliked Tedros's dark hair, which is blond in the books. Viewers praised the actors, however, particularly Wylie.

The School for Good and Evil was the most-viewed film on Netflix on October 20, 2022, the day after its release. According to Nielsen Media Research, during its first six days of release, it received 1.058 billion viewing minutes, placing second on the streaming chart after the television series The Watcher. In its first week, the film debuted at number one on Netflix's Top 10, (Note: A chart released by Netflix that shows the most-viewed productions each week) with 78.83 million hours viewed. The next week, it dropped to second, behind The Good Nurse, having received 41.95 million viewing hours. In its third week, The School for Good and Evil ranked third on the Top 10 chart—after Enola Holmes 2 and The Good Nurse—with 19.03 million hours viewed. The film placed ninth the next week after garnering 8.85 million viewing hours. The following week, it dropped off the chart.

=== Awards and nominations ===
Awards and nominations received by The School for Good and Evil
Award	Date of ceremony	Category	Recipient(s)	Result	Ref.
MTV Movie & TV Awards	May 7, 2023	Best Musical Moment	"You Should See Me in a Crown"	Nominated	

== Potential sequel ==
In October 2022, Feig stated: "We're actually already figuring out what the next [film is] going to be". He has the goal of creating a franchise with the material from the other The School for Good and Evil novels. According to Chainani, the possibility of the sequel(s) depends on audience reception.
