= Turn board =

A turn board (also known as turning board) is a training device commonly used in the fields of ballet, dance, ice skating, and other athletics in order to aid in the development of various dance turns. It is believed that regular use of a turning board may increase confidence and comfort while performing various moves that involve turns. In dance and gymnastics, a turn is a rotation of the body about the vertical axis. It is usually a complete rotation of the body, although quarter (90°) and half (180°) turns are possible for some types of turns

== History ==
Ballet is a type of performance dance that originated in the Italian Renaissance courts of the 15th century and later developed into a concert dance form in France and Russia. It has since become a widespread, highly technical form of dance with its own vocabulary based on French terminology. It has been globally influential and has defined the foundational techniques used in many other dance genres. Becoming a ballet dancer requires years of training. Ballet has been taught in various schools around the world, which have historically incorporated their own cultures to evolve the art.

== Design ==
Turning boards come in various materials and subtle variations in design. Generally, the turn boards will be 10 – 12 inches in length, and 3-4 inches in width as it is a platform for a foot. Turn boards have an arched shape to reduce the boards touchpoint on the ground, and to allow for turning flat footed. Thus causing less friction and more ease of spinning. Generally, the boards are made of wood or a plastic composite that has a friction reducing component, and come in a variety of colors and features.

== Functionality ==
Turning boards normally function through proper application of the law of physics by reducing friction and increasing the ease of spinning.

The user will commonly stand on the turning board with one foot and attempt to rotate the body in an effort to become familiar with the motion of turning and the functions of a dance turn. This increased ease of turning due to the reduced friction, in effect, allows the dancer to focus on other functions of the turn such as spotting, balance, and muscle memory. The turn boards are best used on Marley, wood, or tile floors.

== Users ==
Turning boards are mainly used by ballet dancers and ice skaters in order to aid the process dance turns. However, turning boards are also used by other types of dancers (jazz dance, tap dance, hip-hop dance, etc.) as well as gymnast and other athletes looking for work on the sensation of multiple turns. Its more commonly used for aspiring dancers still mastering their craft.

== See also ==
- Turn (dance and gymnastics)
