= Georgia-May Davis =

British-born Australian actress (born 1995)

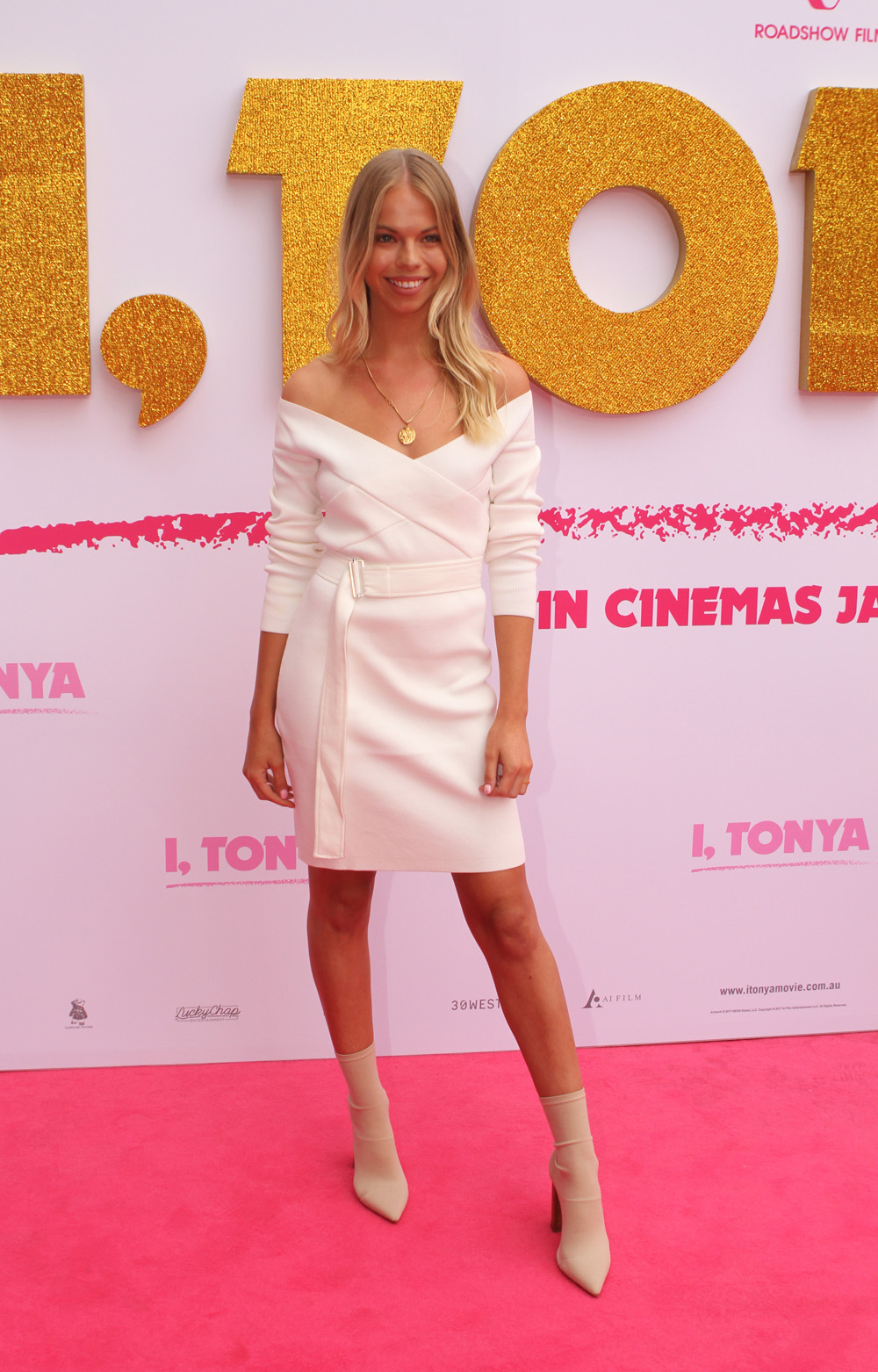
- Davis in 2018
- Born: 12 October 1995 (age 31); London, England, United Kingdom
- Occupation: Actress
- Years active: 2012–present
- Mother: Alyssa-Jane Cook

Georgia-May Davis (born 12 October 1995) is a British-born Australian actress.

== Biography ==
Born on 12 October 1995 in London, England, Davis is the daughter of actress Alyssa-Jane Cook. She spent her early years growing up on the sets of her mother's shows. She attained a Bachelor of Media degree from Macquarie University.

During high school, Davis was cast in Network 10's revamp of the 1970s-1980s show "Young Talent Time".

Davis was offered the role on Disney Channel Australia as a presenter. As part of the role, Davis hosted multiple red carpet events for films and interviewed celebrities such as Cate Blanchett and Rihanna.

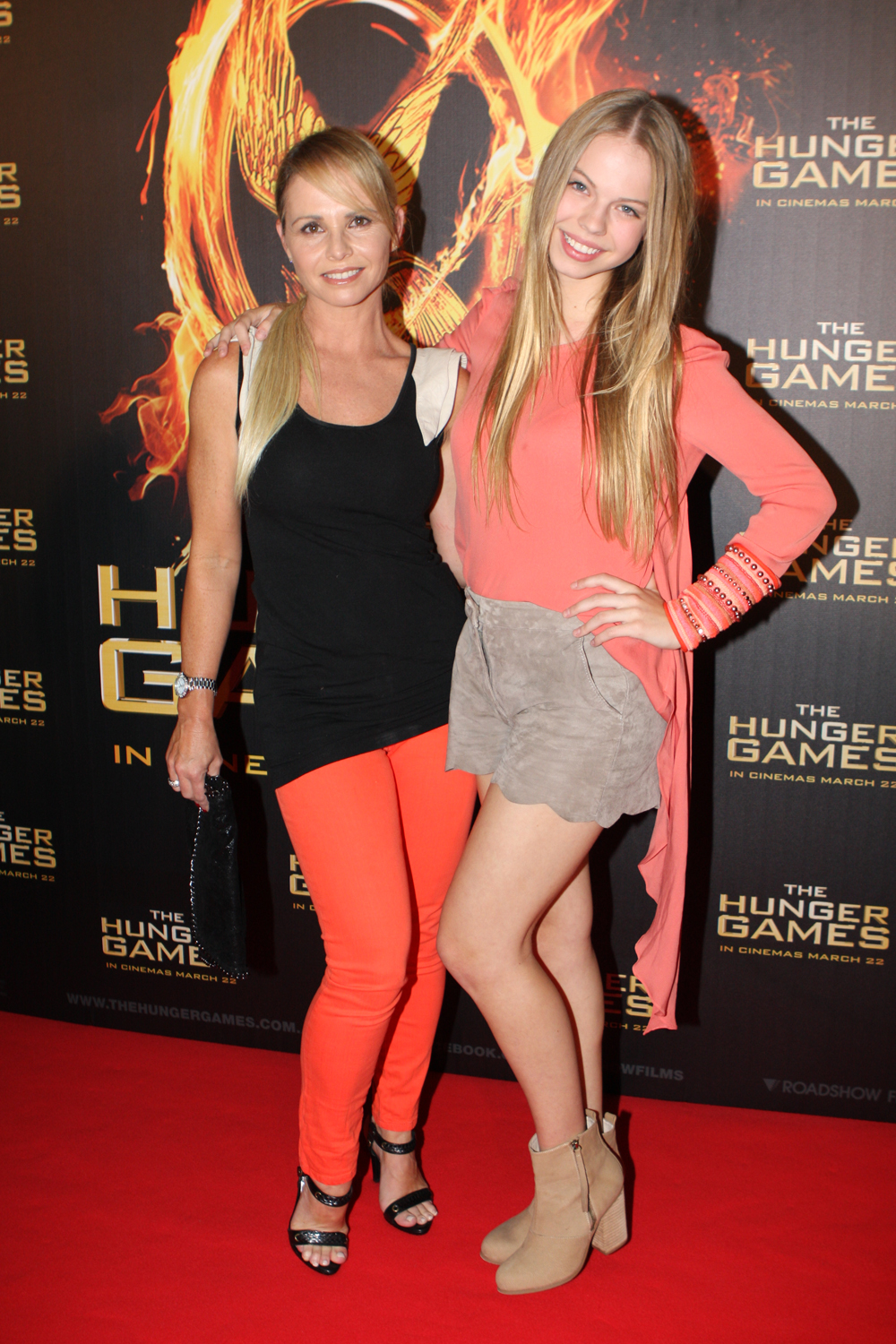
Davis and her mother Alyssa-Jane Cook in 2012.

In 2021, Davis starred in the TV-series "Dive Club" which was first aired on Network 10 and later Netflix. The 12-part crime series is set in the fictional seaside town of Cape Mercy and focuses on a group of teenage ocean divers. Davis plays the role of Lauren Rose, the character whose disappearance after a cyclone becomes a mystery. The series was filmed on the Great Barrier Reef in Port Douglas, Queensland.
