= Dive Club =

Australian television drama series for children

- Genre: Teen drama
- Created by: Steve Jaggi
- Starring: Miah Madden; Georgia-May Davis; Aubri Ibrag; Sana'a Shaik; Mercy Cornwall; Alexander Grant; Josh Heuston; Ryan Harrison; Joseph Spanti; Phoenix Mendoza
- Country of origin: Australia
- Original language: English
- No. of series: 1
- No. of episodes: 12

Production
- Executive producers: Jack Christian; Vanessa Shapiro
- Producers: Steve Jaggi; Spencer McLaren
- Camera setup: Single-camera
- Running time: 27 minutes
- Production companies: The Steve Jaggi Company; Netflix; Network 10; Filmology Finance

Original release
- Network: 10 Shake
- Release: 29 May – 26 June 2021

Dive Club is an Australian teen drama television series, which premiered on 10 Shake from 29 May 2021 as a movie-length special. The series was distributed worldwide on Netflix on 3 September 2021. It follows a feisty group of teen divers who race to find their best friend when she disappears after a storm hits their small coastal town.

== Production ==
The 12 part series is produced by The Steve Jaggi Company with international sales handled by Nicely Entertainment. Showrunner Steve Jaggi produced the series with Spencer McLaren and executive producers Jack Christian and Vanessa Shapiro. The directors include Hayley McFarlane, Rhiannon Bannenberg and Christine Luby. The series was filmed in Port Douglas, Queensland.

== Cast ==
- Miah Madden as Maddie
- Georgia-May Davis as Lauren Rose
- Aubri Ibrag as Anna
- Sana'a Shaik as Stevie
- Mercy Cornwall as Izzie
- Joshua Heuston as Henry
- Alexander Grant as Hayden
- Joseph Spanti as Brad
- Phoenix Mendoza as Camille
- Jai Koutre as Chief Jack Rose
- Veronica Neave as Mayor Renee Volkov
- John McNeill as Sea Dog
- Kate Peters as Victoria Volkov
- Tim Ross as John Martin
- Yasmin Kassim as Lucinda
- Spencer McLaren as Hotel Pool Attendant

== Episodes ==
No.	Title	Original release date
1	"Chapter 1: Endurance"	29 May 2021
2	"Chapter 2: Flower of the Sea"	29 May 2021
3	"Chapter 3: The Rising Sun"	29 May 2021
4	"Chapter 4: SS Gothenburg"	5 June 2021
5	"Chapter 5: The Adelaide"	5 June 2021
6	"Chapter 6: Dimitri Donskoii"	5 June 2021
7	"Chapter 7: Mary Celeste"	19 June 2021
8	"Chapter 8: RMS Republic"	19 June 2021
9	"Chapter 9: Nemesis"	19 June 2021
10	"Chapter 10: Admella"	26 June 2021
11	"Chapter 11: Black Swan"	26 June 2021
12	"Chapter 12: Queen Anne's Revenge"	26 June 2021
