= Miah Madden =

Australian actress and presenter

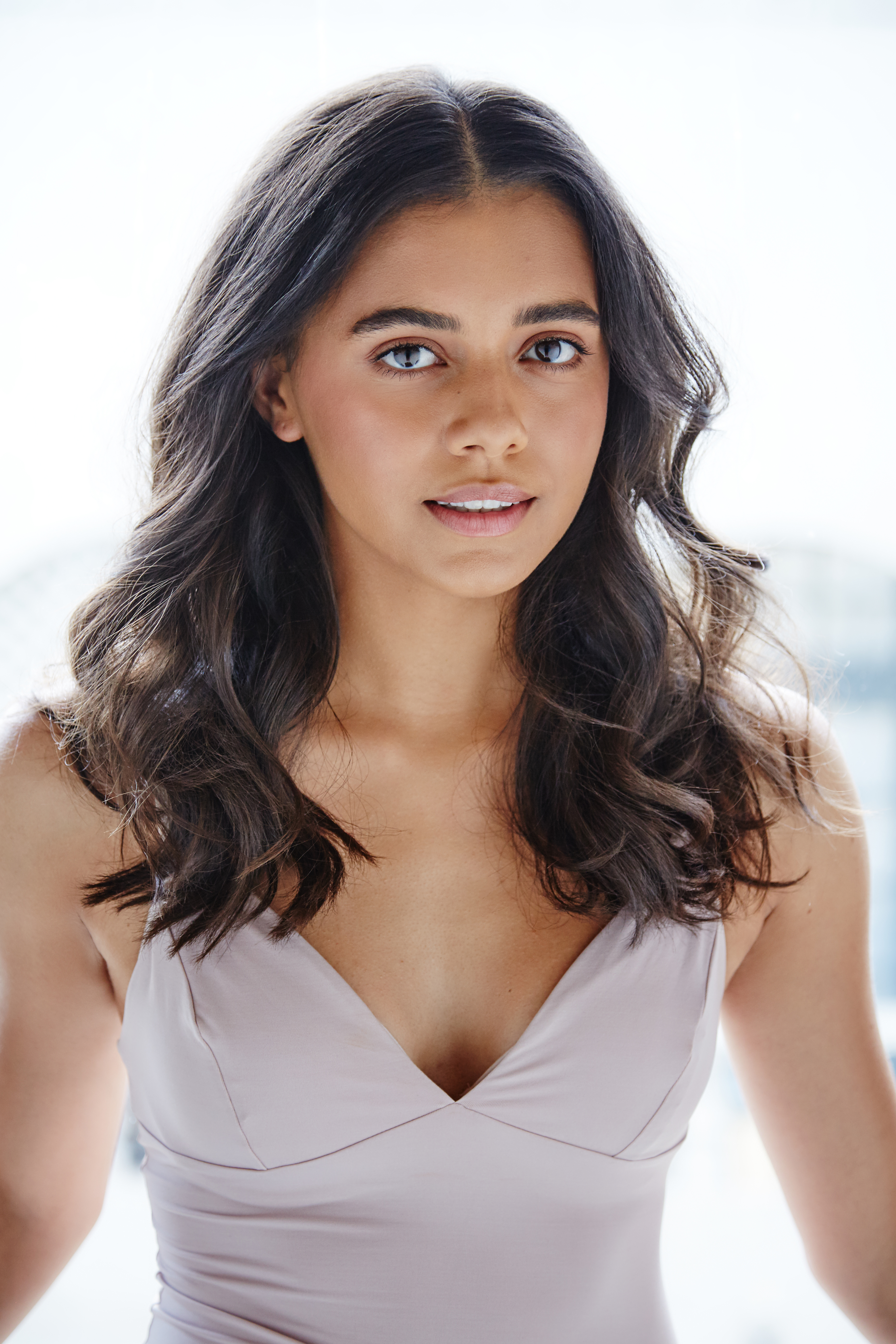
- Madden in 2020
- Born: Miah Grace Madden; 2002 or 2003 (age 23–24); Sydney, New South Wales, Australia
- Education: St Catherine's School, Waverley, Sydney
- Occupations: Actress, presenter
- Years active: 2012–present
- Relatives: Madeleine Madden (half-sister)

Miah Grace Madden' (born 2002 or 2003) is an Australian actress and presenter. She began her career as a child actress in the film The Sapphires (2012) and the ABC Television series The Gods of Wheat Street (2014). She has since starred in the ABC Me series The Unlisted (2019), the 10 Shake series Dive Club (2021), the Network 10 and Paramount+ series Paper Dolls (2023), and the Netflix series My Brilliant Career (2026).

== Early life and education ==
Miah Grace Madden was born in 2002 or 2003 Sydney and is from Rose Bay, a suburb east of Sydney. She is the daughter of Lee Madden, who was a Gadigal man with some Bundjalung heritage, and Belinda Kirkpatrick. Her father died in a car accident in 2003 when Miah was two and her mother was pregnant with her sister Ruby. She is the younger half-sister of Madeleine Madden.

She attended St Catherine's School, Waverley.

== Career ==
Madden began her career playing a younger version of Jessica Mauboy's character in the 2012 film The Sapphires. She reprised a young Mauboy again in her "Never Be the Same" music video. She landed her first major television role as Athena Freeburn in the ABC TV drama The Gods of Wheat Street.

Madden played April Tucker in the 2017 film Australia Day. She appeared in the 2018 NITV series Little J & Big Cuz.

In 2019 and 2020, Madden starred in two children's science fiction series: the ABC Me series The Unlisted (2019) as Kymara and the 9Go! series The Gamers 2037 (2020) as Kite. She hosted the third season of the Nickelodeon Australia series Crash the Bash and had a recurring role in the ABC Me comedy-drama Mustangs FC.

In 2021, Madden starred as Maddie in the 10 Shake teen series Dive Club and joined the cast of the Nickelodeon fantasy The Bureau of Magical Things as Tayla Devlin for its second season.

In 2023, Madden starred as Charlie Levett in the Network 10 and Paramount+ drama series Paper Dolls.

In 2026 she stars as Betty, a housemaid, in the Netflix Australian period drama TV series My Brilliant Career.

== Filmography ==
=== Film ===
Year	Title	Role	Notes
2012	The Sapphires	Young Julie	
2013	The Darkside		
2017	Australia Day	April Tucker	
2023	The Overthrow	Iris	Short film
2025	Half Past Midnight	Harper	Short film
TBA	Black Prince	Sophie	Post-production

=== Television ===
Year	Title	Role	Notes
2013	Redfern Now	Young Mattie	Episode: "Consequences"
2014	The Moodys	Billy	Mini-series; episode: "Australia Day"
2014	The Gods of Wheat Street	Athena Freeburn	Main role; 6 episodes
2016	Hyde & Seek	Alicia	Mini-series; 1 episode
2017–2021	Little J & Big Cuz	Monti	Recurring role (series 1–4; 12 episodes)
2019	Mustangs FC	Jas	Recurring role (series 2; 11 episodes)
2019	Crash the Bash	Herself	Series 3; 6 episodes
2019	The Unlisted	Kymara	Main role; 15 episodes
2020–2021	The Gamers 2037	Kite	Main role; 26 episodes
2021	Dive Club	Maddie	Main role; 12 episodes
2021	The Bureau of Magical Things	Tayla Devlin	Recurring role (series 2; 15 episodes)
2022	Bali 2002	Danni	Mini-series; 2 episodes
2022–2025	Play School	Herself - Presenter	Series 57–60; 17 episodes
2023	Koala Man	(voice)	Episode: "Deep Pockets"
2023	The Clearing	Max Dhurrkay	Mini-series; 6 episodes
2023–2024	Paper Dolls	Charlie Levett	Main role; 8 episodes
2024	Eddie's Lil' Homies	Lottie (voice)	Main role; 10 episodes
2024	Troppo	Tayla	Series 2; 8 episodes
2025	Return to Paradise	Ayesha Abara	Episode: "Death Trip"
2025	He Had It Coming	Jess	7 episodes
2026	My Brilliant Career	Betty	

=== Music videos ===
- "Never Be the Same" (2014), Jessica Mauboy
