= Lana Golja =

Australian actress

- Born: Melbourne
- Occupation: Actress

Lana Golja is an Australian actress. She is best known for her role of Nicola Grey in the television series Worst Year of My Life, Again! which premiered on 26 April 2014 on ABC3. She has also appeared on Winners & Losers, Upper Middle Bogan, House Husbands and Wentworth.

== Filmography ==
=== Television ===
| Year | Title | Role |
|---|---|---|
| 2014 | Worst Year of My Life, Again! | Nicola Grey |
| 2016 | Wentworth | Victim's Daughter |
| 2016 | Winners & Losers | Chloe Bowden |
| 2016 | Upper Middle Bogan | Brooke |
| 2017 | House Husbands | Kelly |
