= One True King (novel) =

2020 novel by Soman Chainani

- Author: Soman Chainani
- Illustrator: Iacopo Bruno
- Cover artist: Iacopo Bruno
- Language: English
- Series: The School for Good and Evil
- Genre: Fairytale fantasy
- Publisher: HarperCollins
- Publication date: June 2, 2020
- Publication place: United States
- Pages: 616
- ISBN: 978-0-06-299976-4
- OCLC: 1085593112
- Preceded by: A Crystal of Time
- Followed by: The Rise of the School for Good and Evil
- Website: schoolforgoodandevil.com/books/one-true-king/

One True King is a 2020 fairytale fantasy by Soman Chainani. The final novel of The School for Good and Evil series and set after the events of A Crystal of Time, the book details Tedros', son of King Arthur, fight to become King of Camelot and prevent Japeth, who is impersonating his brother, from becoming the "One True King".

== Plot ==
The book opens with Anadil, Hester, and Dot searching for Sophie. They are unaware that Sophie is being controlled, and that whenever she tries to remember her past she suffers immense pain. The trio discovers something is wrong when they see that Sophie is about to marry "Rhian" (who is actually his brother Japeth).

Agatha and Tedros, meanwhile, have found King Arthur's ring (which can keep the Storian alive), and they use Wish Fish to find Sophie. Sophie, being controlled, attempts to kill Agatha, and Agatha then realizes her friend must be under Japeth's control. Before the fight can truly become a large-scale war, Excalibur returns to the stone, and King Arthur's voice informs everyone that there must be a contest to prove whether it is Tedros or Japeth who is the true king; the winner will be king and the loser will be beheaded. Later, Tedros also learns that Japeth and Rhian were not King Arthur's sons and that their true parents are still unknown.

With Excalibur's new challenge in mind, Agatha, Hort, and Nicola set off with Tedros to help him achieve the first test, and in doing so, find a version of Merlin turned into a baby. Sophie, meanwhile, is on a hunt to find out more about her past - despite the pain it gives her. She discovers the snake "scims" that Japeth can create are in her ears, feeding on her memories. She uses her powers to painfully remove them from her head before escaping. Meanwhile, Hester, Anadil, and Dot search for Dot's father, who they believe may still be alive; Japeth catches up to Sophie as she in turn catches up to Tedros, Agatha, Hort, and Nicola. During a battle, it is discovered that Japeth is the son of Rafal, the now-deceased School Master.

Eventually, after Tedros and Japeth complete more tests, the time comes for the winner to be selected. Japeth is selected, and Tedros is beheaded. However, Merlin manages to revive Tedros with a Wizard Wish from the Lady of the Lake, and the results are shown to be a mistake after Agatha and Sophie steal the fabric from Japeth and incinerate it, with the sword returning to the stone. Japeth, it turns out, had murdered Lady Gremlaine's son Chaddick, who was Tedros' half-brother (unbeknownst to King Arthur and the rest of the society in the Endless Woods); he had then used Chaddick's blood to trick Excalibur and Camelot's crown into believing that he was the true king. With this truth finally uncovered, Tedros pulls Excalibur from the stone and Japeth is then beheaded.

Tedros and Agatha are marrying at the School for Good and Evil. Meanwhile, Hort's break-up with Nicola allows Sophie to pursue a romantic relationship with him. Additionally, Anadil and Hester are hinted at being in a romantic relationship as well. Before the wedding starts, Tedros then finds Merlin's hat starting to fall apart. He rushes to Honor Commons to find Merlin rapidly aging from the effects of the potion. Merlin requests Tedros to tell Merlin how he convinced Nimue to give him her Wizard Wish: On a cold night, Tedros woke Agatha up to tell her there was an Evil artifact in a cave under the ocean that, if found, could keep their Happy Ending intact. After finding the cave, Agatha finds the ring he left there for her: Not cold water, not Evil, nothing could rend their love. Merlin then peacefully passes away.

== Development ==
On August 22, 2019, the title was revealed to be One True King which Chainani cited as the only choice. The cover of the book was revealed on October 8, 2019, by Entertainment Weekly. Prior to its publication, a signed Barnes & Noble edition, featuring an exclusive poster and quiz was announced to be able to buy. The book was published on June 2, 2020.

== Promotion ==
Chainani was initially set to do a 12-city tour to promote the book which was cancelled. Instead, virtual public events were held. For example, there was a game called Escape the School in which guests participate in a trivia exam about the books, with the highest scorer winning a Nintendo Switch. 150 children were given the chance to have five-minute video call with Chainani in a "golden ticket" event. The trailer for the book was published on April 14, 2020, on YouTube by EverNever TV.

== Reception ==
Kirkus Reviews gave the book a positive review, praising the quests, epiphanies, backstory, conversations, concept of true love, and ending.
