= Sofia Wylie =

American actress, dancer, and singer (born 2004)

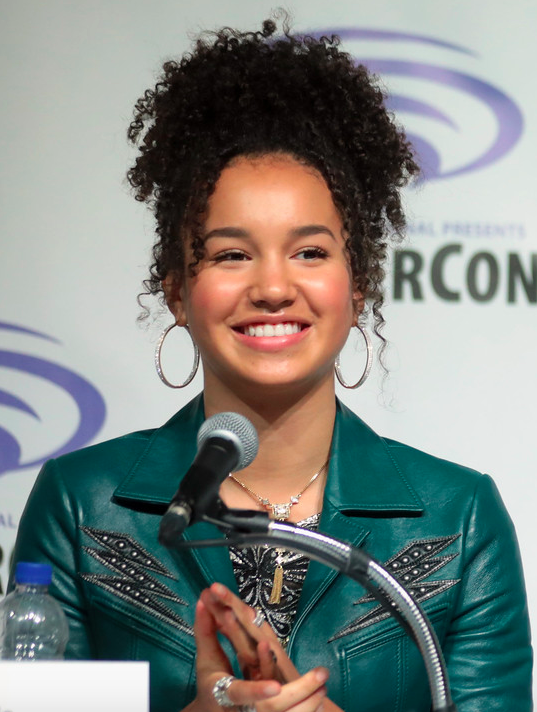
- Wylie at the 2019 WonderCon
- Born: Sofia Christine Wylie; January 7, 2004 (age 22); Scottsdale, Arizona, U.S.
- Occupations: Actress; dancer; singer
- Years active: 2011–present

Sofia Christine Wylie (born January 7, 2004) is an American actress, dancer and singer. She began her career in dance before gaining prominence through her role as Buffy Driscoll on the Disney Channel comedy-drama series Andi Mack (2017–2019).

Wylie continued to work with Disney; her work included the film Back of the Net (2019), the Marvel Rising (2019) animated franchise and Spider-Man (2020), the web series Shook (2019), and most prominently, the Disney+ mockumentary High School Musical: The Musical: The Series (2019–2023). She also starred in the Netflix fantasy film The School for Good and Evil (2022). She has since appeared in the Netflix series The Body (2026).

== Early life ==
Wylie was born in Scottsdale, Arizona, and grew up in Tramonto, to parents Chris and Amy. Her father is African-American of partial Korean ancestry, and her mother is white of German and English descent. She has an older sister, Isabella "Bella", who appeared in an episode of Chopped Junior and won. Wylie has been dancing since she was 5 years old, and trained in acting at Second City Training Center in Hollywood, California.

== Career ==
Wylie started her career in dance, making appearances on So You Think You Can Dance in 2011 and 2016 and America's Got Talent in 2015. She performed on Justin Bieber's Purpose World Tour. In 2017, she started the Internet-based 4K Dance Series with Utah dancers while filming Andi Mack. In 2019, she started Dancing with Sofia Wylie, an IGTV educational dance series.

In 2016, it was announced that Wylie would star in her first major acting role as Buffy Driscoll, a main character and one of Andi's best friends on the Disney Channel series Andi Mack. Wylie made her film debut as Cory Bailey in the 2019 Australian film, Back of the Net, which had a theatrical release in Australia and aired on Disney Channel in the United States. Wylie debuted her first single, "Side by Side", for Marvel Rising: Chasing Ghosts in January 2019. She voiced the role of Riri Williams / Ironheart in the animated TV movie Marvel Rising: Heart of Iron, which aired on Disney XD. She reprised the role for Marvel Rising: Battle of the Bands and in season 3 of Spider-Man.

On February 15, 2019, Wylie was cast as Gina Porter in the Disney+ series High School Musical: The Musical: The Series, which was available from launch that November. It was announced in August that Wylie would star as Mia in Shook, a short-form web series premiering on Disney Channel's YouTube channel in September.

In March 2019, Wylie launched a production company, AIFOS and optioned the rights to adapt Jenny Torres Sanchez's novel, The Fall of Innocence, as its first project. In June 2019, Wylie signed with United Talent Agency.

== Videography ==
=== Music video appearances ===
Music video appearances
Year	Song title	Artist	Ref.
2025	"Machine Girl"	Adéla	

== Filmography ==
=== Film ===
Year	Title	Role	Notes	Ref.
2019	Back of the Net	Cory Bailey		
2022	The School for Good and Evil	Agatha / Aggie		
2025	The Map That Leads to You	Connie		
2027	Romy and Michele 2	TBA	Filming	
TBA	Shiver	TBA	Post-production	

=== Television ===
Year	Title	Role	Notes	Ref.
2011	So You Think You Can Dance	Herself	2 episodes	
2016	So You Think You Can Dance	Herself	2 episodes	
2015	America's Got Talent	Herself	1 episode	
2017	Nicky, Ricky, Dicky & Dawn	June	3 episodes	
2017–2019	Andi Mack	Buffy Driscoll	Main role	
2019	Marvel Rising: Heart of Iron	Ironheart / Riri Williams (voice)	Television film	
2019	Marvel Rising: Battle of the Bands	Ironheart / Riri Williams (voice)	Television special	
2019	Shook	Mia Brooks	Main role	
2019–2023	High School Musical: The Musical: The Series	Gina Porter	Main role	
2020	Descendants Remix Dance Party	Herself	TV special	
2020	Spider-Man	Ironheart / Riri Williams (voice)	2 episodes	
2023	My Little Pony: Bridlewoodstock	Ruby Jubilee (voice)	Television special	
2023	Generation Gap	Herself	Episode: "Jerry Rice Pudding"	
2026	The Body	Grace Franklin	Main role	

== Awards and nominations ==
Year	Award	Category	Work	Result	Ref.
2019	Young Entertainer Awards	Best Young Ensemble in a Television Series	Andi Mack	Won	
2019	Young Entertainer Awards	Best Leading Young Actress in a Television Series	Andi Mack	Nominated	
2021	Kids' Choice Awards	Favorite Female TV Star	High School Musical: The Musical: The Series	Nominated	
2022	Kids' Choice Awards	Favorite Female TV Star	High School Musical: The Musical: The Series	Nominated	
