= The Suite Life of Zack & Cody season 3 =

The Suite Life of Zack & Cody
- Season 3
- No. of episodes: 22

Release
- Original network: Disney Channel
- Original release: June 23, 2007 – September 1, 2008

Season chronology
- ← Previous; Season 2

The third and final season of The Suite Life of Zack & Cody aired on Disney Channel from June 23, 2007 to September 1, 2008. Zack and Cody Martin are twin brothers who move into the Tipton Hotel in Boston with their mother, Carey, where she sings and performs in the lounge. The show also centers in London Tipton, the daughter of the hotel owner, who is very wealthy and ditzy, the hotel's down-to-earth candy-counter girl, Maddie Fitzpatrick, and Mr. Moseby, the strict, dutiful, and serious manager, who is often the foil to Zack and Cody's schemes and has a liking to the piano, pocket hankies and ballet.

The returning recurring characters who were introduced in previous seasons, include: Adrian R'Mante as Esteban, Brian Stepanek as Arwin, Sophie Oda as Barbara, Aaron Musicant as Lance, Sammi Hanratty as Holly, Bo Crutcher as Skippy, Tyler Steelman as Mark, Charlie Stewart as Bob, Robert Torti as Kurt, Brittany Curran as Chelsea, Patrick Bristow as Patrick, Camilla & Rebecca Rosso as Jessica and Janice, Anthony Acker as Norman, Sharon Jordan as Irene, Marianne Muellerleile as Sister Dominick, Jerry Kernion as Chef Paolo, Ernie Grunwald as Mr. Forgess, Kaycee Stroh as Leslie and Alexa Nikolas as Tiffany. After being absent in season two and in almost every season three episode, Estelle Harris returns in the series finale as Muriel.

Alongside the old recurring cast there are also new characters introduced: Giovonnie Samuels as Nia Moseby, Kara Taitz as Millicent, Cierra Ramirez as Jasmine, Hannah Leigh Dworkin as Amy, Jaelin Palmer as Leah, Jareb Dauplaise as Wayne and Tara Lynne Barr as Haley.

Not returning for this season are the following cast members: Monique Coleman as Mary Margaret, Alyson Stoner as Max, Allie Grant as Agnes, Vanessa Hudgens as Corrie, Gus Hoffman as Warren and Caroline Rhea as Ilsa.

Special guest stars and notable appearances in this season include: Michael Clarke Duncan as Coach Little, Meaghan Jette Martin as Stacey, Mark Indelicato as Antonio, Kathy Najimy as Principal Millitich, Kay Panabaker as Amber, Tony Hawk as himself, Jaden Smith as Travis, Drew Seeley as Geoffrey, Kelsey Chow as Dakota, Daniella Monet as Dana, Chris Brown as himself, The Cheetah Girls as themselves and Nicole Sullivan as Miss Klotz.

In this season Dylan Sprouse, Cole Sprouse, Brenda Song, Phill Lewis and Kim Rhodes appeared in all episodes while Ashley Tisdale was absent for eleven episodes.

== Plot ==
In the season premiere, Cody graduates from Buckner Middle School, however Zack has to go to summer school because he failed English but ends up being the best in class. Cody searches for a summer job and ends up working at Paul Revere Mini Mart, which is managed by Wayne Wormser. Maddie becomes a camp counselor and finds that she needs to spend the summer with a group of juvenile girls including Holly, the little con-artist and hustler from the season two episode "Have a Nice Trip". London Tipton gets a summer romance with the hotel employee Lance, despite her rich friends not being supportive of the couple since he isn't rich like them and constantly embarrasses her. He ends up breaking up with her before the end of the summer after meeting someone else. Mr. Moseby's niece, Nia replaces Maddie in the hotel candy-counter and becomes friends with Zack, Cody and London. Once summer is over, Zack, Cody, London (who was expelled from Our Lady of Perpetual Sorrow Catholic School for skipping school), Nia, Barbara, Bob and Mark join Cheevers High School and end up getting in trouble on the first day. After being away in Antarctica, Maddie returns and also joins Cheevers High School. In the beginning she doesn't get along with Nia. London starts a web show titled "Yay Me! Starring London Tipton", produced by Cody and eventually Maddie too. In the episode "Let Us Entertain You" the SS Tipton is first introduced when Zack and Cody get an offer to stay at the King Neptune suite if Carey accepts to sing at the cruise. This ship would become the new main setting in the Suite Life spin-off The Suite Life on Deck. In the series finale, we finally get to know why Muriel disappeared during seasons two and three: she had been retired for a few years. This season also includes an episode titled "Lip Synchin' in the Rain" that aired five days before the premiere of High School Musical 2 and aired as a repeat episode the same night as High School Musical 2 and is about a school production of High School Musical.

== Theme song and opening sequence ==
The theme song is the same as in previous seasons, with the opening sequence replacing a few scenes with new ones from season three.

== Cast ==
=== Main cast ===
- Dylan Sprouse as Zack Martin
- Cole Sprouse as Cody Martin
- Brenda Song as London Tipton
- Ashley Tisdale as Maddie Fitzpatrick
- Phill Lewis as Mr. Moseby
- Kim Rhodes as Carey Martin

=== Special guest cast ===
- Michael Clarke Duncan as Coach Little

=== Notable appearances ===
- Meaghan Jette Martin as Stacey
- Mark Indelicato as Antonio
- Kathy Najimy as Principal Millitich
- Kay Panabaker as Amber
- Tony Hawk as himself
- Jaden Smith as Travis
- Drew Seeley as Geoffrey
- Kelsey Chow as Dakota
- Justin Baldoni as Diego
- Daniella Monet as Dana
- Chris Brown as himself
- The Cheetah Girls as themselves
- Nicole Sullivan as Miss Klotz
- Estelle Harris as Muriel

=== Recurring cast ===
- Brian Stepanek as Arwin Hawkhauser
- Giovonnie Samuels as Nia Moseby
- Adrian R'Mante as Esteban Ramirez
- Sophie Oda as Barbara Brownstein
- Aaron Musicant as Lance Fishman
- Sammi Hanratty as Holly
- Kara Taitz as Millicent
- Cierra Ramirez as Jasmine
- Hannah Leigh Dworkin as Amy
- Jaelin Palmer as Leah
- Jareb Dauplaise as Wayne Wormser
- Bo Crutcher as Skippy
- Tyler Steelman as Mark
- Charlie Stewart as Bob
- Robert Torti as Kurt Martin
- Brittany Curran as Chelsea
- Tara Lynne Barr as Haley
- Patrick Bristow as Patrick
- Camilla & Rebecca Rosso as Jessica and Janice
- Marianne Muellerleile as Sister Dominick
- Jerry Kernion as Chef Paolo
- Ernie Grunwald as Mr. Forgess
- Kaycee Stroh as Leslie
- Alexa Nikolas as Tiffany

=== Co-stars ===
- Sharon Jordan as Irene
- Anthony Acker as Norman

== Episodes ==
The Suite Life of Zack & Cody season 3 episodes
| No. overall | No. in season | Title | Directed by | Written by | Original release date | Prod. code | Viewers (millions) |
|---|---|---|---|---|---|---|---|
| 66 | 1 | "Graduation" | Rich Correll | Danny Kallis & Adam Lapidus | June 23, 2007 | 303 | N/A |
After Cody becomes class valedictorian, because of passing all of his classes, Zack finds out that he has failed English and is unable to graduate so he has to attend summer school. After the boys' father Kurt comes over to visit to take some time off from his tour so he can watch his boys graduate and getting their diplomas, he lies to his parents, making them believe that he passed and that he will graduate as Zack sneaks into graduation and stealing someone's cap and gown and pretending to get a diploma by shooting a spitball at one of the teachers. However, at the party they throw for the boys' graduation, he is overcome with guilt and announces in front of everyone that he has failed English and that he didn't graduate and Zack is forced to give Kurt back his favorite vintage guitar that Kurt gave to him. Meanwhile, Maddie becomes a camp counselor and finds that she needs to spend the summer with a group of juvenile girls including Holly, the little con-artist and hustler from "Have a Nice Trip". Guest stars: Hannah Leigh Dworkin as Amy, Ernie Grunwald as Mr. Forgess, Sammi Hanratty as Holly, Marianne Muellerleile as Sister Dominick, Sophie Oda as Barbara Brownstein, Jaelin Palmer as Leah, Cierra Ramirez as Jasmine, Robert Torti as Kurt Martin, Todd Tucker as Puppeteer
| 67 | 2 | "Summer of Our Discontent" | Rich Correll | Jeny Quine & Dan Signer | June 30, 2007 | 301 | 3.1 |
Cody searches for a summer job, and finds a "help wanted" sign at the local mini-mart. When the owner realizes Cody is friends with London, he will only hire Cody if he will set him up on a date with her. Meanwhile, Zack repeats English in summer school, but when Zack discovers he is the smartest student in his summer school class, all the other kids give him three hanging wedgies but in the end he tutors them too which causes them to pass the entire summer school class. Zack later finds the wedgies strangely relaxing. Title reference: The phrase "Now is the winter of our discontent," from Shakespeare's Richard III Guest stars: Tara Lynne Barr as Haley, Adam Cagley as Brick, Jareb Dauplaise as Wayne Wormser, Mary Scheer as Mrs. Laura Bird, Tyler Steelman as Mark, Kara Taitz as Millicent Absent: Ashley Tisdale as Maddie Fitzpatrick Note: Maddie is mentioned in this episode.
| 68 | 3 | "Sink or Swim" | Rich Correll | Jeny Quine & Dan Signer | July 8, 2007 | 305 | 3.7 |
Since Zack is done with summer school now that he has finally passed English, Carey asks him if he wants to find a summer job. When the girls at camp overhear Maddie on the phone with London, they report the latest juicy gossip to the tabloids. Since all the news is saying that London can't swim, she starts taking swim lessons with Lance. After he teaches her to swim in a shallow pool, she falls in love with him. Arwin takes Zack in as his assistant, but Zack doesn't want to do all the required dirty work, so he hides in the mini-mart as Zack ends up getting a job there. Guest stars: Jareb Dauplaise as Wayne Wormser, Hannah Leigh Dworkin as Amy, Sammi Hanratty as Holly, Aaron Musicant as Lance, Jaelin Palmer as Leah, Cierra Ramirez as Jasmine, Brian Stepanek as Arwin Hawkhauser, Kara Taitz as Millicent, Kelly Vaughn as Customer
| 69 | 4 | "Super Twins" | Rich Correll | Jim Geoghan & Pamela Eells O'Connell | July 13, 2007 | 306 | 5.7 |
Zack and Cody wish upon a star and become superheroes. Zack gets super speed and Cody gets telekinesis and can read minds. However, Mr. Moseby has become a super villain called the Mean-ager, whose evil plot is to turn all kids into adults with the help of his minions, Bellboy (Esteban) and the Engineer (Arwin). However, in the end, Zack finds out it was only a dream after he ate three slices of cold pizza before going to bed. Guest stars: Hannah Leigh Dworkin as Amy, Sammi Hanratty as Holly, Jaelin Palmer as Leah, Brian Peck as Mirror, Adrian R'Mante as Esteban, Cierra Ramirez as Jasmine, Brian Stepanek as Arwin, Charlie Stewart as Bob Note: This episode was part of Disney Channel's "Wish Gone Amiss Weekend"
| 70 | 5 | "Who's the Boss?" | Rich Correll | Danny Kallis & Adam Lapidus | July 22, 2007 | 302 | 4.1 |
At the mini-mart, Cody does all the work but Zack gets all the credit. With the help of Arwin, Cody gets a machine to help him with his job. But when the machine breaks and causes total chaos in the store, Cody gets fired, and Zack tries to help Cody get his job back. Meanwhile, London doesn't know how to present Lance to her friends, because Lance embarrasses her constantly. Guest stars: Brittany Curran as Chelsea, Jareb Dauplaise as Wayne Wormser, Hannah Leigh Dworkin as Amy, Sammi Hanratty as Holly, Aaron Musicant as Lance, Alexa Nikolas as Tiffany, Jaelin Palmer as Leah, Cierra Ramirez as Jasmine, Brian Stepanek as Arwin Hawkhauser, Todd Tucker as Puppeteer
| 71 | 6 | "Baggage" | Rich Correll | Jim Geoghan & Pamela Eells O'Connell | July 22, 2007 | 304 | 5.1 |
A competing mini-mart issues a competition to see who can bag items faster. Meanwhile, Mr. Moseby's niece, Nia (Giovonnie Samuels), comes to the Tipton and works as the candy counter girl in Maddie's absence. Instead of preparing for the challenge, Zack and Cody are goofing off at a party with London and Nia. Note: This is the first appearance of Nia Moseby. Guest star: Bo Crutcher as Skippy, Jareb Dauplaise as Wayne Wormser, Giovonnie Samuels as Nia, Adam Shapiro as Carl Pitz, Kara Taitz as Millicent Absent: Ashley Tisdale as Maddie Fitzpatrick
| 72 | 7 | "Sleepover Suite" | Danny Kallis | Adam Lapidus | July 28, 2007 | 307 | N/A |
To impress Stacey (Meaghan Jette Martin), Cody tells her that she can have her birthday slumber party in London's hotel suite while she is in Scotland but, when London comes home early, Zack, Cody, and Nia must find a way to keep London out of the suite. Meanwhile, Carey is constantly pursued by a barbershop quartet named The Mellow Notes because she is so beautiful. In the end, Cody, Zack, and Nia confess everything, making Stacey lose interest in Cody and the three grounded. Also, the barbershop quartet has Moseby join the band and they sing to Carey. Guest stars: Charles G. Davis as Ed, Elise Howard as Jeanie, Meaghan Jette Martin as Stacey, John Lathan as Mel, Raini Rodriguez as Betsy, Jon Rubin as Mitch, Giovonnie Samuels as Nia, Harvey Shield as Murray Absent: Ashley Tisdale as Maddie Fitzpatrick
| 73 | 8 | "The Arwin That Came to Dinner" | Rich Correll | Jeny Quine | August 5, 2007 | 308 | N/A |
Arwin couldn't fix things right because his mother remarried and moved out. When Zack and Cody invite Arwin over for dinner and stay overnight, he won't seem to leave, because he doesn't want to be alone. Carey is getting annoyed at him so she forces Zack and Cody to make him go. Meanwhile, Lance dumps London and she wants to find a way to get back with him. Guest stars: Antony Acker as Norman the Doorman, Samantha Droke as Wanda, Megan Hilty as Enid, Aaron Musicant as Lance, Giovonnie Samuels as Nia, Brian Stepanek as Arwin Hawkhauser Absent: Ashley Tisdale as Maddie Fitzpatrick
| 74 | 9 | "Lip Synchin' in the Rain" | Rich Correll | Danny Kallis & Dan Signer | August 12, 2007 | 318 | 4.8 |
London (even though she can't sing or dance) gets the role of Sharpay in their school production of High School Musical instead of Maddie because Mr. Tipton is financing the director's play ("Floss") on Broadway. Zack has to work backstage for detention and Cody gets the part of Troy. Guest stars: Mitchell Whitfield as Mr. Blaine, Mark Indelicato as Antonio Note: Maddie references Ashley Tisdale (who actually plays Maddie in the series) a few times by saying that she looks like Sharpay (which Ashley Tisdale also played in High School Musical), though no other character on the show seems to agree.
| 75 | 10 | "First Day of High School" | Lex Passaris | Howard Nemetz | August 26, 2007 | 310 | 4.2 |
It is the first day of high school for Zack and Cody. Zack finds a new crush, Amber, (Kay Panabaker). Cody saves Bob from Vance, the school bully, Nia gets in trouble for defending Zack, and Mark (from Zack's summer school class in "Summer of Our Discontent") gets Cody's help to learn to be a geek and Cody and Vance get in trouble for fighting in the classroom and the two end up in detention along with Zack, Nia and Mark after Ms. Millitich, the school principal discovers the incident. London attends public school for the first time (after being expelled again from Our Lady of Perpetual Sorrow for not showing up regularly), in which she is out to tear down lockers for her own personal lounge. Guest stars: Matt Angel as Vance, Blythe Auffarth as Ellen, Kathy Najimy as Ms. Millitich, Kay Panabaker as Amber, Giovonnie Samuels as Nia, Andrew Slamet as Lenny Woo, Tyler Steelman as Mark, Charlie Stewart as Bob Absent: Ashley Tisdale as Maddie Fitzpatrick: Note: Maddie is mentioned in this episode.
| 76 | 11 | "Of Clocks and Contracts" | Rich Correll | Tim Pollock | September 15, 2007 | 309 | N/A |
Zack tries to negotiate a better contract for Carey as the Tipton's nightly singer to Mr. Moseby so they could stay at the Tipton. After losing her science tutor, London asks and pays Cody to help her with her project. Nia also wants Cody's help and bribes him with concert tickets to Yo Yo Ma. Cody quits and London and Nia combine their machines, inventing a French Fry maker. Guest star: Giovonnie Samuels as Nia Absent: Ashley Tisdale as Maddie Fitzpatrick
| 77 | 12 | "Arwinstein" | Rich Correll | Pamela Eells O'Connell | October 6, 2007 | 313 | N/A |
It is Halloween at the Tipton. When looking for Arwin, Zack and Cody accidentally release a robot Frankenstein monster (created by Arwin), who is almost an exact replica of Arwin. The employees think 'Arwinstein' is Arwin in his costume for Halloween. Meanwhile, London is hosting a Halloween party at the Tipton, which has a costume contest, and the winner gets diamonds. Arwinstein shows up at the party and becomes the winner of London's costume contest. Soon, Arwinstein kidnaps Carey and everyone finds out that Arwinstein is a monster. Guest star: Bo Crutcher as Skippy, Wilson Davis as Arwinstein Double, Dave Matos as Arwin Double, Aaron Musicant as Lance, Adrian R'Mante as Esteban, Brian Stepanek as Arwin/Arwinstein Absent: Ashley Tisdale as Maddie Fitzpatrick
| 78 | 13 | "Team Tipton" | Rich Correll | Howard Nemetz | October 27, 2007 | 312 | 3.3 |
Maddie returns and does not get along with Nia at all, while Esteban and Patrick are also fighting. Carey then gets into an argument with Patrick, after saying he was making noise during her performance. Meanwhile, when Zack causes some customers to leave, he and Cody schedule a bug convention at the Tipton to make it up to Mr. Moseby. However, Zack, who is afraid of bugs, accidentally releases the bugs into the Tipton. Mr. Moseby makes arrangements for a seminar to be held at the Tipton for himself, Arwin, Esteban, Patrick, Carey, Millicent, Maddie, London, and Nia to help them to learn to respect their co-workers. Guest stars: Patrick Bristow as Patrick, Bo Crutcher as Skippy, Pat Finn as Sandy, Adrian R'Mante as Esteban, Giovonnie Samuels as Nia, Brian Stepanek as Arwin, Kara Taitz as Millicent Note: This is the only time where Ashley Tisdale as Maddie Fitzpatrick and Giovonnie Samuels as Nia Moseby both appear in the same episode.
| 79 | 14 | "Orchestra" | Rich Correll | Jeff Hodsden | November 10, 2007 | 311 | 4.4 |
Cody becomes jealous of the new violinist Sergei, a Russian prodigy. When Sergei starts to flirt with Barbara, Cody's girlfriend, he becomes jealous and determined to win her back at the orchestra's performance at the Tipton. Meanwhile, London wants to learn the business of the Tipton hotel, so she shadows all the jobs in the Tipton, including the bellboy and maid, and causes chaos for the guests and all the employees. But when she goes for Mr. Moseby's job, she realizes all the nasty things the workers at the Tipton have to say about her. Note: This episode was part of Disney Channel's November 2007 "Night of Premieres". Guest star: Antony Acker as Norman the Doorman, Susan Blakely as Mrs. Madigan, Max Bugrov as Sergei, Naomi Chan as Grace, Sharon Jordan as Irene the Concierge, Sophie Oda as Barbara, Adrian R'Mante as Esteban, Kyle Sanders as Billy Absent: Ashley Tisdale as Maddie Fitzpatrick
| 80 | 15 | "A Tale of Two Houses" | Rich Correll | Jim Geoghan | November 17, 2007 | 314 | N/A |
Zack and Cody's father, Kurt, rents an apartment in Boston, and both twins invite a girl over at the same time without the other knowing it. Meanwhile, London teaches Esteban how to act rich because his family inherits the throne to his country, but ends up ruining everything for Esteban and when a military coup d'etat has overthrown Esteban's royal family, all his luxury items are subject to repossession, forcing Esteban to go back to his old job as a bellhop. Esteban's friend, a hot dog vendor named Hector, takes the place as a rich person and goes Island Shopping with London. Guest stars: Amanda Gallo as Abby, Rolando Molina as Hector, Sophie Oda as Barbara, Adrian R'Mante as Esteban, Tyler Steelman as Mark, Rachel Thorp as Cassandra, Robert Torti as Kurt Martin Absent: Ashley Tisdale as Maddie Fitzpatrick
| 81 | 16 | "Tiptonline" | Rich Correll | Dan Signer | December 15, 2007 | 315 | N/A |
Cody helps London with her website Yay Me! Starring London Tipton and produces a video on her site. Meanwhile, Zack gets addicted to Medieval Magic Quest, an online game. Mr. Moseby is playing the game too, so they become friends online. Cody is tired of all the things London makes him do (wearing high heels, etc.), so he quits. London's site then starts to get less viewers and she apologizes to Cody, inviting him back to be the producer. Meanwhile, Zack and Mr. Moseby discover each other's identity in the game and they later try to quit because the game proves to be addictive. Guest star: Brittany Curran as Chelsea Absent: Ashley Tisdale as Maddie Fitzpatrick
| 82 | 17 | "Foiled Again" | Danny Kallis | Billy Riback | February 1, 2008 | 319 | 3.8 |
Tony Hawk checks into the Tipton; Maddie and London each have a crush on their fencing instructor. While Zack and Cody are doing their science project, the problem is that Cody has a fear of germs, and when Zack makes a mistake when analyzing a germ from the kitchen and thinks it is a toxic type of black mold, the rumor spreads through the hotel and everyone starts panicking. Cody gets over his fear after he realizes that he can't go skateboarding with Tony Hawk wearing an anti-germs suit. Guest stars: Justin Baldoni as Diego, Booth Colman as Scooter, Marcy Goldman as Mrs. Rittenhouse, Tony Hawk as himself, Jerry Kernion as Chef Paolo
| 83 | 18 | "Romancing the Phone" | Rich Correll | Danny Kallis & Pamela Eells O'Connell | April 19, 2008 | 317 | N/A |
Zack and Cody befriend Travis, a kid whom they rope into helping them impress their dates because his father works on a cruise ship. They then bail on Travis and go out with their dates, but lets Travis go with the girls instead. Maddie finds a stranger's phone whom she thinks is her crush (because she and the stranger have many of the same interests, which she found out on the lost phone). At the end, the owner of the phone was an old man, but Maddie takes an interest in the old man's grandson named Jeffrey. Guest stars: Jaden Smith as Travis, Kelsey Chow as Dakota, Morgan Leigh as man on Guerney, June Kyoku Lu as Barbara's grandmother, Sophie Oda as Barbara, William Schallert as David, Drew Seeley as Jeffrey and Fantasy David
| 84 | 19 | "Benchwarmers" | Jim Drake | Danny Kallis | July 19, 2008 | 316 | N/A |
Zack tries out for the high school basketball team but realizes there's some stiff competition, the kind he didn't face in middle school, and worse yet, the giant, in-your-face Coach Little (Michael Clarke Duncan). Meanwhile, when they're rejected as cheerleaders, Cody and London form their own cheer-leading squad with the help of Mr. Moseby, who ends up doing a jumping cheer and landing right into the arms of a gruff Coach Little. Note: This is the last appearance of Giovonnie Samuels with her role of Nia Moseby only in Season 3 Special guest star: Michael Clarke Duncan as Coach Little Guest stars: Tara Lynne Barr as Haley, Hunter Gomez as Rick, Daniella Monet as Dana, Sophie Oda as Barbara, Camilla and Rebecca Rosso as Janice and Jessica Ellis, Giovonnie Samuels as Nia, Kaycee Stroh as Leslie Absent: Ashley Tisdale as Maddie Fitzpatrick
| 85 | 20 | "Doin' Time in Suite 2330" | Rich Correll | Jeny Quine & Adam Lapidus | August 9, 2008 | 320 | N/A |
When Zack and Cody crash an offscreen wedding and have Mr. Moseby injured by angry people, they get grounded and are forbidden to leave their suite for the rest of the week; Maddie steps in for Cody as the producer of London's Internet show. In order to win the Golden Netty award, Cody sneaks out and gets The Cheetah Girls as guest stars for London's show but is surprised when he finds out that Maddie has already booked Chris Brown as a guest star. In the end, Carey finds out and goes on a rampage against her sons' blatant disobedience, scaring Chris and the Cheetah Girls. It ends up that Maddie and Cody both win the Golden Netty and Carey was the top download of the week as "Ranting Mom". Guest stars: Chris Brown as himself, The Cheetah Girls - Adrienne Bailon, Sabrina Bryan and Kiely Williams as themselves Note: Following Chris Brown's domestic violence case involving Rihanna, Disney Channel banned the episode from airing in reruns. Additionally, this episode is not included on Disney+, however it is available for purchase on the iTunes Store.
| 86 | 21 | "Let Us Entertain You" | Rich Correll | Danny Kallis & Pamela Eells O'Connell | August 16, 2008 | 321 | N/A |
Zack and Cody get an offer to stay in the King Neptune suite on the SS Tipton with their mother if she will sing, however, they don't tell her that she will have to sing, and after a couple hours she finds out herself. Since Carey does not think it is a vacation if she has to work, she offers to pay for her room herself, although the only room she can afford is the "Sardine Suite" in other words the storage room. Also, Sardine Suite members only get fed one small plate of food a day. Carey finally gives in and agrees to sing. Unfortunately, she falls asleep in the sun and gets a sunburn, no longer able to perform. Zack and Cody then perform in her place, stating that because their mother has made so many sacrifices for them, it is time they made a sacrifice for her. When the uptight cruise director says this is not authorized, the audience applauds Zack and Cody and says they put on a great show. Meanwhile in Boston, London is hosting a 24-hour telethon during her "Yay Me! Staring London Tipton" broadcast. In this episode of "Yay Me" London takes Maddie's advice to raise money for the less fortunate through phone pledges. They plan to have special guests come in from around the world and perform to help the cause. However, a blizzard occurs, which prevents any of London's guests for her broadcast to get to the hotel (since the roads have all been closed). Therefore, they are forced to improvise, which include Mr. Moseby jumping through a hoop like a dog, Maddie and London performing a ventriloquist act, and London spinning plates. After almost the full 24 hours, London gets tired and decides to log off. Then they realize that their internet connection has been lost for over twenty three hours and that all their performances had been for nothing. Instead, they decide to give the left-over food from the Tipton to the food shelter once or twice a week. Guest stars: Nicole Sullivan as Miss Klotz Note: The same cruise set (the SS Tipton) is used in The Suite Life on Deck. The cityscape background seen throughout the episode is that of the Miami skyline.
| 87 | 22 | "Mr. Tipton Comes to Visit" | Lex Passaris | Jim Geoghan | September 1, 2008 | 322 | N/A |
The news of a visit from Mr. Tipton gets the employees excited and they start reminiscing about their good deeds, while thinking about who deserves a possible $50,000 bonus. When Mr. Tipton arrives he is in a bad mood, which means somebody will be fired and nobody will get the raise; all fingers point to Carey due to her sons' mishaps. Muriel, who has already retired, and having been bribed $20 by Zack and Cody, tricks Mr. Tipton into firing her. Notes: This is a flashback episode and aired during "The Suite Life and Times of London Tipton" marathon. Guest stars: Estelle Harris as Muriel, Brian Stepanek as Arwin, Bob Joles as Mr. Tipton
