= The Suite Life of Zack & Cody season 2 =

The Suite Life of Zack & Cody
- Season 2
- No. of episodes: 39

Release
- Original network: Disney Channel
- Original release: February 3, 2006 – June 2, 2007

Season chronology
- ← Previous; Season 1 Next → Season 3

The second season of The Suite Life of Zack & Cody aired on Disney Channel from February 3, 2006 to June 2, 2007. Zack and Cody Martin are identical twin brothers who move into the Tipton Hotel in Boston with their mother, Carey, where she sings and performs in the lounge. The show also centers in London Tipton, the daughter of the hotel owner, who is very wealthy and ditzy, the hotel's down-to-earth candy-counter girl, Maddie Fitzpatrick, and Mr. Moseby, the strict, dutiful, and serious manager, who is often the foil to Zack and Cody's schemes and has a liking to the piano, pocket hankies and ballet.

This season a lot of returning recurring characters who were introduced in season one return, such as: Adrian R'Mante as Esteban, Charlie Stewart as Bob, Brian Stepanek as Arwin, Monique Coleman as Mary Margaret, Sophie Oda as Barbara, Patrick Bristow as Patrick, Aaron Musicant as Lance, Allie Grant as Agnes, Anthony Acker as Norman, Sharon Jordan as Irene, Alyson Stoner as Max, Gus Hoffman as Warren, Robert Torti as Kurt, Caroline Rhea as Ilsa and Ernie Grunwald as Mr. Forgess.

Alongside the old recurring cast there are also new characters introduced: Camilla & Rebecca Rosso as Jessica and Janice, Bo Crutcher as Skippy, Marianne Muellerleile as Sister Dominick, Vanessa Hudgens as Corrie, Jerry Kernion as Chef Paolo, Sammi Hanratty as Holly, Tyler Steelman as Mark, Brittany Curran as Chelsea, Kaycee Stroh as Leslie and Alexa Nikolas as Tiffany.

Not returning for this season are the following characters: Estelle Harris as Muriel and Dennis Bendersky as Tapeworm.

Special guest stars and notable appearances in this season include: Zac Efron as Trevor, Moises Arias as Randall, D. C. Douglas as Interviewer, Kathryn Joosten as Grandma Marilyn, Raven-Symoné as Raven Baxter, Miley Cyrus as Hannah Montana, Selena Gomez as Gwen, Kumiko Mori as herself, Mindy Sterling as Sister Rose, Cheryl Burke as Shannon, Tahj Mowry as Brandon, Tom Poston as Merle, Nathan Kress as Jamie, Daryl Mitchell as Daryl, The Veronicas as themselves.

In this season Dylan Sprouse, Cole Sprouse, Phill Lewis and Kim Rhodes appeared in all episodes while Brenda Song was absent for two episodes and Ashley Tisdale was absent for one episode.

== Plot ==
During this new season, we see Zack and Cody on their last year of middle school in Buckner Middle School; and their adventures as Tipton Hotel residents. We also finally see Our Lady of Perpetual Sorrow Catholic School, the school Maddie and Mary Margaret attended during season one, and is now also being attended by London. This season features a special crossover episode titled "That's So Suite Life of Hannah Montana" featuring characters from That's So Raven and Hannah Montana. A one-hour special episode titled "The Suite Life Goes Hollywood" is also a part of this season.

== Theme song and opening sequence ==
The theme song is the same as in the first season with the opening sequence replacing a few scenes from season one with scenes from season two.

== Cast ==
=== Main cast ===
- Dylan Sprouse as Zack Martin
- Cole Sprouse as Cody Martin
- Brenda Song as London Tipton
- Ashley Tisdale as Maddie Fitzpatrick
- Phill Lewis as Mr. Moseby
- Kim Rhodes as Carey Martin

=== Special guest cast ===
- Raven-Symoné as Raven Baxter
- Miley Cyrus as Hannah Montana
- Kumiko Mori as herself

=== Notable appearances ===
- Zac Efron as Trevor
- Moises Arias as Randall
- D. C. Douglas as Interviewer
- Kathryn Joosten as Grandma Marilyn
- Selena Gomez as Gwen
- Mindy Sterling as Sister Rose
- Cheryl Burke as Shannon
- Tahj Mowry as Brandon
- Tom Poston as Merle
- Nathan Kress as Jamie
- Daryl Mitchell as Daryl
- The Veronicas as themselves

=== Recurring cast ===
- Adrian R'Mante as Esteban Ramirez
- Charlie Stewart as Bob
- Brian Stepanek as Arwin Hawkhauser
- Camilla & Rebecca Rosso as Jessica and Janice Ellis
- Monique Coleman as Mary Margaret
- Sophie Oda as Barbara Brownstein
- Patrick Bristow as Patrick
- Marianne Muellerleile as Sister Dominick
- Vanessa Hudgens as Corrie
- Aaron Musicant as Lance Fishman
- Allie Grant as Agnes
- Alyson Stoner as Max
- Bo Crutcher as Skippy
- Gus Hoffman as Warren
- Jerry Kernion as Chef Paolo
- Robert Torti as Kurt Martin
- Sammi Hanratty as Holly
- Tyler Steelman as Mark
- Caroline Rhea as Ilsa Shickelgrubermeiger
- Brittany Curran as Chelsea
- Ernie Grunwald as Mr. Forgess
- Kaycee Stroh as Leslie
- Alexa Nikolas as Tiffany

=== Co-stars ===
- Sharon Jordan as Irene
- Anthony Acker as Norman

== Episodes ==
The Suite Life of Zack & Cody season 2 episodes
| No. overall | No. in season | Title | Directed by | Written by | Original release date | Prod. code | Viewers (millions) |
|---|---|---|---|---|---|---|---|
| 27 | 1 | "Odd Couples" | Danny Kallis | Adam Lapidus | February 3, 2006 | 203 | N/A |
London likes a merit scholar (Zac Efron), and Maddie helps her to trick him into thinking she is smart. Cody moves into a coat closet because Zack is too messy and doesn't clean his side of the room. To Zack's surprise, Cody makes the room more "home" like by putting in a flat-screen TV and more. After the fire department kicks Cody out of the closet for going over the maximum occupancy, he moves back in and Zack promises to clean his side of the room. It has the gag out of the TV show The Odd Couple that Zack is like Oscar and Cody is like Felix. Guest star: Zac Efron as Trevor, Troy Gentile as Jeremy, Gus Hoffman as Warren, Charlie Stewart as Bob Note: This was the second time that Ashley Tisdale and Zac Efron worked together on Disney, the first time was the High School Musical movies.
| 28 | 2 | "French 101" | Rich Correll | Jim Geoghan | February 10, 2006 | 201 | N/A |
The French Ambassador and his daughter visit the Tipton Hotel, and both Zack and Cody develop a crush on the daughter, Jolie, although neither of them know French. Following his mother's advice, Cody locks Zack in a coat closet, then hires Mr. Moseby to translate for him. He eventually gets to dance with Jolie, but while doing so, Zack arrives with two cards: One full of compliments and one full of insults. Cody takes the insults (which he mistakes for compliments) and the daughter goes to Zack. However, Bob, who speaks fluent French, gets Jolie at the end. Meanwhile, Esteban is upset when London can beat a street thief but he can't. To cheer him up, Maddie arranges a plan for Arwin to pretend to be a thief and let Esteban defeat him. Things go wrong when Arwin forgets about the plan and Esteban must fight a real thief instead. Note: The waiter that said "Third door on the left" was also in the episode Shipnotized on Suite Life on Deck. Guest stars: Richard Gleason as Maurice, Katelyn Pippy as Jolie, Adrian R'Mante as Esteban Ramirez, Brian Stepanek as Arwin Hawkhauser, Charlie Stewart as Bob
| 29 | 3 | "Day Care" | Jim Drake | Jeff Hodsden | February 17, 2006 | 204 | N/A |
Zack and Cody are overrun by a group of unruly little kids after they volunteer to help out in the hotel's daycare. Guest stars: Moises Arias as Randall, Wynter Daggs as Brandi, Logan Grove as Johnny, Joey King as Emily, Adrian R'Mante as Esteban, Cheryl Rusa as Woman in hotel, Sara Christine Smith as Randall's Mom
| 30 | 4 | "Heck's Kitchen" | Rich Correll | Pamela Eells O'Connell | February 24, 2006 | 207 | N/A |
Mr. Moseby receives information that a food critic called Bernard Burnaise is coming to the Tipton to try out the food. He is told that Burnaise has three different disguises: A middle-aged woman, a Chinese man with a long beard, and a cowboy. Mr. Moseby then hires Zack and Cody to sneak around the hotel and find out who exactly is Burnaise. They conclude that a Texan cowboy is actually Burnaise and Mr. Moseby orders Chef Paolo to cook a wonderful meal for him. Things take a turn for the worse when Chef Paolo quits after being insulted, and Cody must take over, having London, Maddie, and Zack as his kitchen staff. What they don't know is that although the cowboy is impressed with his meal, he is actually not the real food critic, who suddenly appears to give the Tipton another chance when he realizes the situation and the struggle to serve the cowboy. Chef Paolo then decides to go back to work at the Tipton, where his being in charge assures that the Tipton will get good reviews. Guest stars: Patrick Bristow as Patrick, Jim Jansen as Critic, Jerry Kernion as Chef Paolo, Curtis Taylor as Texan
| 31 | 5 | "Free Tippy" | Rich Correll | Jeny Quine | March 3, 2006 | 202 | 3.42 |
Zack and Cody try to save the Tipton's carriage horse (Tippy) from being sold to a mean lumberjack when the horse carriage driver Henry gets retired. London borrows Maddie's great grandmother's brooch, but when she loses it, Maddie makes her feel bad. Mr. Moseby arranges a banquet with Mrs. Delecourt. The boys sneak Tippy into the hotel and have him stay with Arwin, but then Tippy escapes so the boys look all around the hotel. London tells Carey that the brooch is in the trash but she is not looking there. But Carey tells her that a good friend would help look for it. So Arwin and London look for it in the dumpster and run into a homeless guy. At the end, Mrs. Delecourt convinces Mr. Tipton not to retire Henry, and the homeless man comes to the hotel with Maddie's brooch. Guest stars: Tim Haldeman as Mr. Benson, Millicent Martin as Mrs. Delacourt, Michael D. Roberts as Henry, Brian Stepanek as Arwin
| 32 | 6 | "Forever Plaid" | Jim Drake | Tim Pollock | March 20, 2006 | 205 | 4.12 |
Zack and Cody make a hole in a wall, and Arwin helps them fix it. Zack and Cody then discover that they can see soccer girls in the next room, so they invite their friends to look in the hole too. They later get found out by Mr. Moseby and Carey and they all end up with a sore eye. Meanwhile, London transfers to Maddie's school and causes her to get a detention, later they pretend to be nuns from Finland. Guest stars: Monique Coleman as Mary Margaret, Vanessa Hudgens as Corrie, Marianne Muellerleile as Sister Dominick, Brian Stepanek as Arwin and Charlie Stewart as Bob
| 33 | 7 | "Election" | Rich Correll | Howard Nemetz | March 21, 2006 | 206 | 3.73 |
Zack and Cody both run in a school election, and London and Maddie take sides: Maddie tries to help Cody and London tries to help Zack. At first, Zack was getting more attention (by making lies that the students will get ice cream, supermodels and a skate park if he is president). Later, Cody gets the attention after Zack drops out because he thought that Cody's ideas were better and he would want him to be president. Meanwhile, Arwin attempts to become a better inventor after his rival Irv Wheldon is named "the most efficient man in the hotel business" by Hotel Engineering Quarterly. His attempts, including speeding up the elevators and using a jetpack while washing the windows, fail. Guest stars: Allie Grant as Agnes, Brian Stepanek as Arwin, Charlie Stewart as Bob, Alyson Stoner as Max, N/A as man on intercom
| 34 | 8 | "Moseby's Big Brother" | Rich Correll | Howard Nemetz | March 22, 2006 | 212 | N/A |
Mr. Moseby's smaller-in-size but older-in-age brother comes to the Tipton. He is very rich and they do not really like each other much. Zack and Cody get one bicycle together because they do not have enough money to get their own individual ones. However, Zack begins to keep the bike all for himself which makes Cody angry. Maddie and Esteban send London fake horoscopes to take advantage of her, which backfires when London finds out. Guest stars: Adrian R'Mante as Esteban, Dana Michael Woods as Spencer, Patricia Harris Smith as Guest
| 35 | 9 | "Books & Birdhouses" | Rich Correll | Jim Geoghan | March 23, 2006 | 214 | 3.80 |
London steals Maddie's idea for a school assignment and turns it into a famous book. London's theft backfires when she is sued for a million dollars because Maddie's idea plagiarized a previous book. Meanwhile, Cody signs up for an advanced Calculus Math Class covering tables, Conversion and Convergences, but no one, even the teacher, shows up. Cody is jealous that Zack is acing woodshop, and signs up for it instead. He does not know anything about wood and ends up getting his first demerit and C. Guest stars: Phil Abrams as Travis, Patricia Bethune as Wilhelmina, Max Burkholder as Billy, Lauren Cohn as Yolanda, Chris Dollard as Mr. Woodburn, D. C. Douglas as Interviewer, Joey King as Emily, Marianne Muellerleile as Sister Dominick, Charlie Stewart as Bob
| 36 | 10 | "Not So Suite 16" | Rich Correll | Adam Lapidus | March 24, 2006 | 213 | 4.13 |
Maddie and London's 16th birthday parties are scheduled on the same day, even though London's birthday was 6 months ago. London refuses to change her date out of selfishness and bribes people with gifts if they come to her party. Cody gets Maddie the perfect gift. Zack wants it, but Cody won't give it to him; he instead helps find Zack a suitable gift. Aside from her family, only Zack shows up at Maddie's party while everyone else goes to London's, thus earning a hug. Maddie and London both have a miserable time and in the end, reconcile and merge parties. Guest stars: Cody Arens as Liam, Donna Cherry as Snooty Woman, Monique Coleman as Mary Margaret, Vanessa Hudgens as Corrie, Kathryn Joosten as Grandma Marilyn, Bernie Kopell as Old Guy, Adrian R'Mante as Esteban
| 37 | 11 | "Twins at the Tipton" | Rich Correll | Pamela Eells O'Connell | March 31, 2006 | 215 | N/A |
The Tipton is having a twin convention. Zack forces Cody, who was recently dumped by his girlfriend Irma, to go out on a double date with Janice and Jessica (Camilla and Rebecca Rosso), who are British identical twins. Maddie and London also go on a double date with twins, and Maddie ends up dating the geek twin who is really smart, yet disturbing; while London gets the handsome twin who is just as dumb as she is. Note: At 4:00-4:05 when Bob tells Cody that he has been dumped by Irma, he says "Irma told Kim who told Phill who told Ashley who told Brenda who told Dylan who told Cole who told me." The names used are the first names of the cast members in the reverse of the sequence shown in the opening credits. Guest stars: Jake Abel as Kirk, Scott Halberstadt as Dirk, Rebecca Rosso as Jessica, Camilla Rosso as Janice, Dan Stanton as Dabney, Don Stanton as Abner, Charlie Stewart as Bob
| 38 | 12 | "Neither a Borrower Nor a Speller Bee" | Lex Passaris | Lloyd Garver | April 14, 2006 | 209 | N/A |
Zack wants Cody to drop out of the junior spelling bee because he owes the $30 to his competitor. Zack gets in trouble in the end for borrowing too much money without attempting to pay it all back. London and Maddie do community service. London sees that her rival got in the newspaper for doing community service, so London brings the paparazzi with her to show off herself doing community service. Sister Dominick also always comes in at the wrong time when London is faking work and Maddie and her friends were pushed out of the way by London, all the credit to London while Maddie, Corrie, and Mary–Margaret are the ones doing ALL the work, and Maddie becomes infuriated as a result. However, London's laziness and publicity stunt backfires when a family baked a cake for Maddie given that she donated some of her old toys to them and Maddie explaining to London that giving people publicity was only for London herself. Fortunately, London makes up for this issue by giving some of her old toys to a family as well. Guest stars: Monique Coleman as Mary Margaret, Vanessa Hudgens as Corrie, Aaron Mouser as Maynard, Marianne Muellerleile as Sister Dominick, Sophie Oda as Barbara, Jim O'Heir as Maynard's dad
| 39 | 13 | "Bowling" | Rich Correll | Danny Kallis | April 28, 2006 | 208 | N/A |
When the Tipton staff keeps losing at sports against Ilsa and the St. Mark crew, Zack tells them he is a good bowler, so they decide to play bowling against them. Arwin, however, has a fear of bowling, and quits. Zack is the best bowler on the Tipton team, but he gets grounded for playing a mean trick on Cody (twice) and kicked off the team, so Arwin has to fill in for him, regardless of a bowling accident that he experienced years ago. Guest stars: Dot-Marie Jones as Gretel, Caroline Rhea as Ilsa, Adrian R'Mante as Esteban, Brian Stepanek as Arwin
| 40 | 14 | "A Kept Man" | Jim Drake | Jeff Hodsden & Tim Pollock | May 19, 2006 | 216 | N/A |
Zack and Cody befriend a rich boy named Theo, who starts snubbing Cody and lavishing Zack with expensive gifts including tickets to a Boston Celtics game and a Black Eyed Peas concert. Zack also begins rejecting Cody. After Theo tries to get Zack to tape the concert, Zack finally ends their friendship before making amends with Cody and agreeing to attend his speech. Meanwhile, London and Maddie have to take care of a baby simulator for school, which keeps them up all night. Maddie mainly does all the work while London just buys him expensive clothing and hires Esteban as a nanny. The doll eventually falls out of a window during a fight and breaks. Maddie and London return the damaged doll to Sister Dominic, expecting to fail, but she instead gives them an A+ for figuring out the purpose of the assignment: taking care of a baby is hard work. They are overjoyed, but Maddie gets in trouble when the recorder in the doll plays a message of her insulting Sister Dominic. Guest stars: Monique Coleman as Mary Margaret, Vanessa Hudgens as Corrie, Marianne Muellerleile as Sister Dominick, Adrian R'Mante as Esteban, Mike Weinberg as Theo Cavenaugh Note: In the UK airings of this episode, the scene where the doll simulator (heavily resembling a baby) is thrown out the window is censored. The following scene is also censored (it does not show the simulator hit Esteban on the head). As well as this, the scene that shows the "baby" being thrown against the couch is censored also. However in "Mr. Tipton Comes to Visit," these scenes are left in.
| 41 | 15 | "The Suite Smell of Excess" | Kelly Sandefur | Billy Riback | June 2, 2006 | 210 | 4.32 |
Arwin builds a machine called the P.U. (Parallel Universalizer) that can take anybody to an alternate universe. Zack and Cody use the machine to travel to a universe where everything is how they like it, but completely opposite of the normal universe: Paris Hilton is President, George Clooney is on the quarter, the Tipton hotel is the Fitzpatrick hotel because Maddie is the one who is rich, and not London. Carey is a successful singer, with Arwin being her producer (Carey is the one who has a crush on Arwin in the parallel Universe, not the other way around). Mr. Moseby's nickname is 'M' and he loves playing in the lobby and disturbing the guests. Lastly, Esteban is a cleaning lady. After spending a few days there, they become tired of it and return to the real universe. Arwin is told about Carey's crush on him and tries to go into the parallel Universe. Esteban dresses up as a cleaning lady for a party. Carey notices the George Clooney quarter and keeps it. Guest stars: Adrian R'Mante as Esteban, Brian Stepanek as Arwin
| 42 | 16 | "Going for the Gold" | Rich Correll | Adam Lapidus | June 10, 2006 | 221 | N/A |
Arwin enters the Hotel Engineers' competition which is taking place at the Tipton. Zack and Cody find out that one of the competitors, Arwin's rival Irv Wheldon, is cheating, so they try to help Arwin win. When Arwin finds this out, he scolds them, insisting he would never stoop to Irv's level. Eventually, Irv gets his comeuppance when he faceplants during a showy stunt to the finish line, leaving Arwin to pass him and win. Meanwhile, in an attempt to prove she doesn't give up so easily, London opens her own store in the hotel and hires Maddie to be in it, but London keeps on insulting the guests and ruining business. London eventually blows up an ad Maddie made on Mr. Tipton's blimp, getting them a lot of customers and money. However, the gas costs for the blimp cost more than what they made, putting them back at square one. Guest star: Donna Pieroni as Woman, Craig Shaynak as Irv Wheldon, Brian Stepanek as Arwin
| 43 | 17 | "Boston Tea Party" | Rich Correll | Pamela Eells O'Connell | June 30, 2006 | 222 | 3.3 |
When Zack and Cody visit the park, they find out it is being cordoned off. Then a construction worker tells them they're going to knock down the tree of liberty and pave the park over into a parking lot. Cody writes an eighteen page letter to convince city hall not to pave the park, but they don't listen. Zack has a dream about the Boston Tea Party and finds out Liberty Park is where they planned it. This gives the construction workers reason to not pave it over. At the end, Mr. Moseby gets a restraining order not to tear down the park. Meanwhile, Esteban is taking a test to become a citizen of the United States. At the end, he passes, but gets jury duty. Esteban is excited, and tries to ask Mr. Moseby for two weeks off. Guest stars: Adrian R'Mante as Esteban Ramirez, Brian Stepanek as Arwin, Charlie Stewart as Bob
| 44 | 18 | "Have a Nice Trip" | Rich Correll | Jeny Quine | July 7, 2006 | 219 | 3.6 |
A hotel patron, Harry O'Neil, claims he fell on Zack's skateboard. Zack and Cody find out that he faked the accident to get free things from the Tipton. The Tipton staff have to serve their "injured" guest with the best service they have, or risk the hotel's reputation being trashed by the man. When Harry's daughter Holly scams Zack, Cody, Maddie and Carey, the four work together to catch him in the act, with Maddie acting as a Russian physiotherapist named Olga and "treats" Harry's injuries. Harry gets up and walks like normal, which makes Mr. Moseby realize that he was faking. Holly was revealed to have masterminded the entire thing, as Mr. Moseby kicks out her and Harry, informing them that he had alerted every hotel on the East Coast of their presence. Absent: Brenda Song as London Tipton Guest stars: Sammi Hanratty as Holly, Eric Lutes as Harry, Adrian R'Mante as Esteban
| 45 | 19 | "Ask Zack" | Eric Dean Seaton | Billy Riback | July 15, 2006 | 224 | 3.4 |
Zack wants a job on the school paper because the only other job was on the band. He then uses his part of the paper (the "Ask Shirley" column) to get a girl named Darlene. London has trouble getting to sleep because there are diamond dust bunnies under her mattress. Guest stars: Sophie Oda as Barbara, Nicki Prian as Darlene, Adrian R'Mante as Esteban, Charlie Stewart as Bob, Camilla Rosso as Jessica and Rebecca Rosso as Janice
| 46 | 20 | "That's So Suite Life of Hannah Montana" (Note: Part 2 of "That's So Suite Life of Hannah Montana") | Rich Correll | Howard Nemetz | July 28, 2006 | 218 | 6.99 |
Raven Baxter visits the Tipton and has a vision that Carey's birthday party will be full of chaos. Meanwhile, Maddie tries to get London to wear Raven's dress but London doesn't want to wear it, as it was not made by someone famous. Also, Cody fears if he will get any bad luck. Maddie tricks London into wearing the dress but London finds out, soon Hannah Montana shows up at the hotel and also wants the dress, so she fights for it with London. Special guest stars: Raven-Symoné as Raven Baxter Special appearance: Miley Cyrus as Hannah Montana Guest stars: Adrian R'Mante as Esteban, Brian Stepanek as Arwin
| 47 | 21 | "What the Hey?" | Lex Passaris | Danny Kallis | August 5, 2006 | 217 | 3.5 |
After they miss the bus, Zack convinces Cody to skip school and go to the mall where they (along with Bob) meet Cody's favorite band, "Everything Stinks," who are shooting a music video. Cody wins a contest to have a part in the video as "Wing Lee", but before the shoot, Carey comes to the mall for shopping and Zack, Cody and Bob try to keep her from seeing them until she leaves. Meanwhile, London and her new stepmother (T Lopez) are having trouble getting along. When Carey finds out that Zack and Cody are ditching school along with Bob, she grounds Zack from movies, desserts, television and music, and Cody from reading for fun for a month. London and Brandi become friends after London apologizes to Brandi for saying all the mean things to her because of her annoyance, thanks to Mr. Moseby's advice. Guest stars: Donna Cherry as Snooty Woman, Monet Lerner as Matisse, T Lopez as Brandi Tipton, Charlie Stewart as Bob, Sean Whalen as Whacky Wally
| 48 | 22 | "A Midsummer's Nightmare" | Lex Passaris | Jeny Quine | August 11, 2006 (Note: This episode was first released in Taking Over the Tipton DVD on July 18, 2006.) | 211 | N/A |
Zack and Cody are in a school play. Cody and a girl named Gwen (Selena Gomez) are going out and Zack likes Vanessa. Zack gets a role in the play where he has to kiss Gwen. When they are practicing the kiss, Gwen starts to like Zack, who doesn't like her back. Vanessa likes Cody. Cody changes the kissing scene with help from Agnes (because she couldn't stand to see Zack kiss another girl). London changes the look of the hotel to bring good luck with the art of Feng Shui, but the arrangement causes more trouble than good. At first, Maddie finds a $100 bill, Esteban's parents get rich due to finding oil, and Moseby gets an exotic vehicle because his breaks down. However, Maddie is arrested since the bill was a fake, Esteban's parents go bankrupt after finding out the oil belonged to a pipeline, and Moseby's "exotic vehicle" is a bike. London ends up getting her good luck back as the pipeline Esteban's family got oil from belonged to Mr. Tipton, who seizes Esteban's family's house and intends to build a resort. Guest stars: Chris Doyle as Messenger, Gage Golightly as Vanessa, Selena Gomez as Gwen, Allie Grant as Agnes, Ernie Grunwald as Mr. Forgess, Asante Jones as G-Man, Loren Lester as Man, Adrian R'Mante as Esteban, Charlie Stewart as Bob
| 49 | 23 | "Lost in Translation" | Rich Correll | Danny Kallis | August 19, 2006 | 223 | 3.3 |
It is International Week at Zack and Cody's school. A Japanese singer (Kumiko Mori as herself) visits the Tipton, and Zack uses her for his school project. When Zack loses the singer at school, Carey, Cody, and Zack end up performing for a large Japanese audience, until Kumiko returns. Meanwhile, London allows Maddie to select some of her old clothes in her closet. But the doorknob broke off the door, locking London and Maddie inside it. Special guest star: Kumiko Mori as herself
| 50 | 24 | "Volley Dad" | Kelly Sandefur | Adam Lapidus | September 8, 2006 | 227 | 4.29 |
Cody is concerned about his mother's new boyfriend, so he calls Kurt to the Tipton for help. Maddie plays a trick on London to get her to play volleyball well. Guest stars: Monique Coleman as Mary Margaret, John Jimmo as Joe, Abby Mason as St. Sylvia's Player, David Shatraw as Harvey, Mindy Sterling as Sister Rose, Kaycee Stroh as Leslie, Robert Torti as Kurt Martin
| 51 | 25 | "Loosely Ballroom" | Rich Correll | Jeny Quine | September 22, 2006 | 225 | 4.42 |
Esteban starts a ballroom dancing class to help earn money for his sister's quinceañera (15th birthday party, similar to a 'sweet 16'). Mr. Moseby schedules a ballroom dancing competition at the Tipton. The gang enters to win money for Esteban's sister's quinceañera. Note: Jared Murillo, Ashley Tisdale's then-boyfriend, has a cameo in this episode. He is seen in the dance competition, but is not credited. Absent: Ashley Tisdale as Maddie Fitzpatrick Guest stars: Cheryl Burke as Shannon, Aaron Musicant as Lance, Adrian R'Mante as Esteban, Alaina Reed Hall as Mrs. Mayweather, Camilla and Rebecca Rosso as Janice and Jessica, Rip Taylor as Leo
| 52 | 26 | "Scary Movie" | Rich Correll | Pamela Eells O'Connell | October 13, 2006 | 228 | 4.2 |
When Zack and Cody take Jessica and Janice to the movies watching a horror movie, which their mother has told them not to see, Zack starts to sleepwalk and piles furniture against the hotel door in the lobby. Meanwhile, London pretends to be poor to impress a boy. Guest stars: Tahj Mowry as Brandon, Camilla and Rebecca Rosso as Janice and Jessica
| 53 | 27 | "Ah! Wilderness!" | Rich Correll | Danny Kallis & Jim Geoghan | November 10, 2006 | 230 | 3.15 |
The boys become Wilderness Scouts, with Mr. Moseby as their leader. When all of their food disappears, Zack saves the team from starvation by finding wild food. Cody is jealous, and when he meets an old man (Tom Poston) who gives him food, Cody lies to the team and says that he found it himself. While the boys are away, Carey tries to have free time, but Maddie and London keep bothering her about a guy Maddie is dating, Cliff Parks. The guy is London's old boyfriend and she still likes him. Carey gives them both advice, not knowing the two were feuding, and the two of them blame Carey for their misfortune after making up. Note: This was Tom Poston's last role before his death. Guest stars: Gus Hoffman as Warren, Tom Poston as Merle, Carla Renata as Veronica, Charlie Stewart as Bob
| 54 | 28 | "Birdman of Boston" | Rich Correll | Jim Geoghan | November 24, 2006 | 220 | 3.85 |
A hawk makes a nest at the Tipton and causes havoc, so Mr. Moseby scares her away. When Cody finds that the hawk laid an egg, he cares for it while Zack films the hatching of the egg to sell on the internet. Cody continues to care for the baby hawk after the egg hatches, but when the baby hawk is ready to be released into the wild, Cody has a difficult time letting him go. Absent: Brenda Song as London Tipton Note: The name of the hawk, "Bubba," is also the name of Dylan and Cole Sprouse's dog. Guest stars: Patrick Bristow as Patrick, Brian Stepanek as Arwin, Camilla and Rebecca Rosso as Janice and Jessica
| 55 | 29 | "Nurse Zack" | Rich Correll | Danny Kallis | December 8, 2006 | 229 | 3.42 |
Cody takes care of Carey when she is sick, but when Cody also falls ill, Zack needs to take care of them both. All of the employees at the Tipton try to win Employee of the Month by sabotaging all of the other employees' stations. Mr. Moseby, growing annoyed, ends the contest early and gives Carey Employee of the Month, as she didn't annoy any of the hotel guests. Carey asks if her prize can be a box of tissues she was already holding, and Mr. Moseby agreed. Guest stars: David Blue as Dr. Chip, Patrick Bristow as Patrick, Aaron Musicant as Lance, Adrian R'Mante as Esteban, Brian Stepanek as Arwin Hawkhauser, Anthony Acker as Norman the Doorman
| 56 | 30 | "Club Twin" | Lex Passaris | Howard Nemetz | January 7, 2007 | 231 | 4.64 |
Zack and Cody try to find summer jobs, so they convince Moseby to let them have the lounge on Monday nights, and they start an underage club. London gives Maddie some of her beauty products called Simply London, but turns out to have a side effect. Guest stars: Charlie Brill as John, Allie Grant as Agnes, Mitzi McCall as Doreen, Sophie Oda as Barbara, Charlie Stewart as Bob, Alyson Stoner as Max
| 57 | 31 | "Risk It All" | Rich Correll | Danny Kallis & Jim Geoghan | January 27, 2007 | 234 | 3.84 |
Zack and Cody enter a game show called "Risk It All". Maddie tries to retrieve an angry email that London accidentally sent to Mr. Moseby – which she didn't intend to send at all. Guest stars: Dan Levy as Jerry Barnes, Adrian R'Mante as Esteban Ramirez
| 58 | 32 | "A Nugget of History" | Danny Kallis | Dan Signer | February 23, 2007 | 236 | 3.54 |
Moseby's grandmother, Rose Moseby (Phill Lewis in a dual role), comes to visit, and helps Zack with his history paper about "Fascinating Firsts of the 1940s", which he writes based on a man named Hugh Mulzac, whom according to Rose was the captain of the first desegregrated ship crew. But Zack gets a "D" because the teacher claims that the facts in Zack's paper are inaccurate, and he also gets a week of detention when Zack talks back trying to defend his assignment. Zack gets help from Grandma Moseby to prove Zack's history teacher was wrong. Meanwhile, London gets a job at Cluck Bucket with Maddie. When London causes Maddie to get her old job back as "Hillary Hen", Maddie becomes furious; but when London is in trouble, it is up to a reluctant Maddie to save her. Guest star: Alan Heitz as Mr. Fliegel, Phill Lewis as Rose Moseby, Oliver Muirhead as Mr. Dwosh
| 59 | 33 | "Miniature Golf" | Jim Drake | Jeny Quine | March 2, 2007 | 232 | 3.99 |
Zack & Cody go on a double date at mini golf. Zack stinks at it, but his date is great. Soon, Zack tries to get help from Mr. Moseby, who was an expert at mini golf. Zack returns to the mini golf course and proceeds to beat everyone sorely. Meanwhile, London starts a book club and Maddie gets tempted to join but realizes that the club isn't discussing about the book and Carey tries to live a healthier life. Guest stars: Brittany Curran as Chelsea, Alicia Favela as Ella, Alexa Nikolas as Tiffany, Sophie Oda as Barbara
| 60 | 34 | "Health and Fitness" | Rich Correll | Howard Nemetz | March 16, 2007 (Note: This episode was first released in That's So Suite Life of Hannah Montana DVD on January 16, 2007.) | 226 | 2.9 |
Every employee at the Tipton is required to take a cholesterol test, and Mr. Moseby is afraid of the needle. Cody tries to get Chef Paolo to eat healthily after bacon bits were found in his blood after the cholesterol test. After looking in a slanted mirror that distorts images, London is worried about being overweight, and Maddie is worried about being too thin. London starts to obsessively exercise and eat nothing while Maddie tries to eat a lot. In an effort to keep Zack from eating too much candy, Carey gives him a strictly healthy diet. Guest star: Jerry Kernion as Chef Paolo, Georgina Rosso as Francesca
| 61 | 35 | "Back in the Game" | Rich Correll | Pamela Eells O'Connell & Adam Lapidus | April 6, 2007 | 237 | N/A |
A wheelchair basketball team is staying at the Tipton, giving Zack the opportunity to persuade his friend Jamie, now permanently using a wheelchair, to start playing the sport again. Maddie tries to make a film for her school project starring London and Lance. Guest stars: Luis Arroyo as Luis, James Bohnett as James, Joseph Diaz as Joseph, Tyler Hunt as Tyler H., Nathan Kress as Jamie, Danny Marvilla as Danny, Daryl "Chill" Mitchell as Daryl, Aaron Musicant as Lance, Daniel Nong as Daniel, Ian Pierson as Ian, Adrian R'Mante as Esteban, Anna Ryan as Anna, Brian Stepanek as Arwin, Charlie Stewart as Bob, Tyler Vickers as Tyler V., Denzel Whitaker as Trent
| 62 | 36 | "The Suite Life Goes Hollywood, Part 1" | Rich Correll | Danny Kallis & Jim Geoghan | April 20, 2007 | 238 | 4.04 |
Two television writers discover about the life of Zack & Cody, and sells a sitcom about the show, and everyone gets to go there to watch it. Although, when Zack and Cody's actors don't work out, Zack and Cody are offered to take their place. Note: Rich Correll, who is actually the director of the show, plays the TV Director. Guest stars: Dante Basco as "Madrid" – Hollywood's London, Benjamin Brown as Hollywood Moseby, Rich Correll as TV Director, Cameron Goodman as Hollywood Maddie, Sam McMurray as Bud, Christopher Neiman as Lou, Michele Nordin as Hollywood Carey, Brecken Palmer as Hollywood Zack, Bridger Palmer as Hollywood Cody
| 63 | 37 | "The Suite Life Goes Hollywood, Part 2" | Rich Correll | Danny Kallis & Jim Geoghan | April 20, 2007 | 239 | 4.90 |
Zack and Cody accept the offer to become the stars of the television show, although Cody gets stage fright and can't act, leading to a fight, so Carey gives them a timeout. During the timeout, some twins (guest stars The Veronicas) sing in front of the audience, and the writers fire Zack & Cody and hire them. Meanwhile, London and Maddie sneak onto a movie set to see a cute actor, and the director mistakes them for stunt doubles. Note: The Veronicas perform their song "Cry" when asked to sing in front of the audience. Note: Ashley Tisdale's real-life sister Jennifer Tisdale played a saloon girl in this episode. Guest stars: Dante Basco as "Madrid" – Hollywood's London, Benjamin Brown as Hollywood Moseby, Rich Correll as TV Director, Cameron Goodman as Hollywood Maddie, Sam McMurray as Bud, Eddie Mekka as Western Movie Director, Christopher Neiman as Lou, Michele Nordin as Hollywood Carey, Richard Whiten as Security Guard, Rik Young as Johnny Vaine, The Veronicas as the Australian twins
| 64 | 38 | "I Want My Mummy" | Phill Lewis | Pamela Eells O'Connell | May 18, 2007 | 235 | N/A |
When London comes back from Peru, she brings back a lot of artifacts, including an ancient necklace and a mummy, which Esteban says is cursed. Zack and Cody want to see the mummy, so they sneak into the suite to see it, but accidentally push it out of the window. As a result, Zack disguises Cody as the mummy until Zack can get the real one. However, Maddie and Esteban feel the mummy should go back where it came from, so they dress up one of Maddie's old dolls to look like the mummy and switch with the one on display (which is really Cody). Eventually, they all find out the original mummy is a fake. Guest star: Jason Brooks as Dakota Smith, Bo Crutcher as Skippy, Adrian R'Mante as Esteban Note: This episode marked Phill Lewis' directorial debut.
| 65 | 39 | "Aptitude" | Danny Kallis | Adam Lapidus | June 2, 2007 | 233 | N/A |
Zack and Cody are surprised by their aptitude test scores: Zack is told he will be a CEO, while Cody is going to turn out as a sanitation engineer. Zack soon starts acting smart, while Cody starts to have a negative attitude. Meanwhile, Maddie saves the life of a Moroccan ambassador, and later London. She becomes famous for a little while and London doesn't like it. But eventually new news comes and Maddie is sad to find out that her 15 minutes of fame are over. Guest stars: Patrick Bristow as Patrick, Chip Chinery as Pete, Andi Matheny as Host, Meg Wolf as Woman
