= List of recurring characters in The Suite Life of Zack & Cody =

The following is a list of recurring and minor characters in the Disney Channel Original Series The Suite Life of Zack & Cody. These characters were regularly rotated, often disappearing for long periods during the series.

== Tipton staff ==
=== Arwin Hochhauser ===
Arwin Quentin Hochhauser (played by Brian Stepanek) is a wacky Greek-American inventor who works as a stationary engineer for the Tipton. He is friends with Zack, Cody, and Maddie in the series. As shown in many episodes, he has a massive crush on Carey but is too afraid to act upon it. He hates carrots and is allergic to horses, as shown in "Free Tippy". Every time Carey kisses him, he faints, as seen in "Kisses & Basketball", "Bowling", and "Going for the Gold". His affection is also shown in his office which has a picture of Carey, as well as a cardboard cutout of her, which he claims to his cousin is his wife. Arwin was a professional bowler, as illustrated in "Bowling", but quit when he lost his ball on the backswing and hit his mother in the head, shrinking her by a foot during a championship match. He is also known for being obsessed with his mother; he lived with her his whole life until she got married and moved out. Arwin is considered childlike by many characters in the show; he enjoys picture books, sleeps with a sock monkey, and eats a lunch packed by his mother. However, Arwin is much loved by Zack and Cody. A spin-off television series was planned about him, where he goes to live with his sister to help her take care of her children. The series name ideas consisted of "Arwin" and "Housebroken", though it was never picked up.

Arwin makes a guest appearance in The Suite Life on Deck via web chat on Cody's laptop in the episode "It's All Greek To Me". Also, in the episode, it's revealed that he has a cousin named Milos in Greece (also played by Stepanek). In the episode "Computer Date", Arwin boards the ship and creates a supercomputer dubbed "Cal" (until he found out it was female, renaming her "Callie") to make the SS Tipton run more efficiently. However, it all goes downhill when Callie develops romantic feelings for Cody, causing her to go haywire and start to remove everyone else, and Arwin is forced to shut her down. At the end of the episode, Arwin attempts to get off the ship by using a giant magnet, but it fails, and he falls into the ocean. In "A London Carol", Mr. Moseby mentions Arwin when London Tipton gets stuck in the past. Arwin makes his final appearance in "Graduation on Deck", finally meeting the twins' real father Kurt, and briefly claiming that he is their stepfather.

=== Esteban Ramírez ===
Esteban Julio Ricardo Montoya de la Rosa Ramírez (played by Adrian R'Mante) is the head bellman at the Tipton. His signature quotes are "This is a disaster!" and "Oh, Mr. Moseby!" He is very close to his heritage, which is revealed to be Peruvian in "I Want My Mummy". He is friends with Zack, Cody, and Maddie. It is revealed during the series that his full name is "Esteban Julio Ricardo Montoya de la Rosa Ramírez". He owns a domestic chicken with blue feet named Dudley. Esteban wants to manage the Tipton, and he is a gifted dancer. He addresses the twins, Zack and Cody, as "little blond peoples", even when he is only talking to one of them, in which case he often has to correct himself. Though he frequently does stupid, naïve, or clumsy things, he is more intelligent than he is given credit for and has a huge heart, which is shown throughout the series. In the dancing episode, after he and the nurse, Shannon Quine, dance, they are briefly shown kissing. It is also stated he is descended from royalty in several episodes and in one becomes temporarily rich because of his royal family. However, his royal family is deposed. In "It's a Mad, Mad, Mad Hotel" it is revealed that Esteban has a crush on Carey. He guest-stars on The Suite Life on Deck in which he has his wedding on the SS Tipton with Francesca (Marisa Ramirez). It is also revealed in that episode that he has been promoted from bellhop to assistant night manager of the hotel. Being a recurring character, Esteban has appeared frequently throughout the show, only absent in a handful of episodes.

=== Lance Fishman ===
Lance Fishman (played by Aaron Musicant) is the Tipton's handsome if somewhat slow-witted young lifeguard, who projects a relaxed and easy going demeanour, but harbours an almost unhealthy obsession with water. He is frequently shown in scenes trying to steer even the most mundane everyday conversations to swimming, the ocean, or sea creatures in some respect. He disrupts Maddie's student film ("Back in the Game") by insisting that she change his character to a merman, and suggesting she replace the front walk with a pool so that he can swim, rather than walk, to the hotel entrance. Later, during London's Halloween party he appears as "the Mighty Lobster". Nonetheless, Lance exhibits remarkable ease with picking up women, scoring dates with both Maddie (who at first had a crush on him) and London (despite her aversion to dating "the help"). Holding onto said women is another story: Maddie dumps him because she finds him dull, and London agrees to break up with him after he meets a woman called Wanda.

=== Wilfred Tipton ===
Wilfred Tipton (voiced by Bob Joles on The Suite Life of Zack & Cody and played by John Michael Higgins on The Suite Life on Deck) is the owner of Tipton hotels & resorts and father to London Tipton. Until The Suite Life on Deck episode, "Twister: Part 3", his face had never been shown. He is usually surrounded by his bodyguards, with only his hand shown. It is not clear how he became the owner of the Tipton, because London mentions many times that her father bought the hotel. However, in a few episodes, it is said that Tipton's ancestors owned the hotel first before he did. This may yet be another example of London's ignorance, or a continuity error or that the Tiptons have not owned it for some time and he bought it back. In the episode "Rock Star in the House", Wilfred is very strict about London's behaviour when it comes to celebrities, and has much concern for her education and growing as a person. His hand was once seen in the episode "Lip Synchin' in the Rain", in which he was wearing a diamond ring. Wilfred Tipton also has a history of marrying much younger women without London's consent, most of whom do not last long. The warranty of Wilfred's wedding gifts (given by Mr. Moseby) lasted longer than the marriages.

In The Suite Life on Deck episode, "Twister: Part 3", Wilfred Tipton (played by John Michael Higgins) finally reveals himself, who is called by a reluctant Cody trying to rescue the Pickett Farm, although Wilfred Tipton buys the destroyed house to build a plastic bag factory. Cody tries to force Mr. Tipton out of the area by saying the dirt in the area contains powerful diseases, but Zack and Woody ruin the plot when they used peeling skin (Mr. Tipton said he watched a movie involving peeling skin). However, his daughter, London, seeing the strong emotions from the group, blackmails Wilfred. After the blackmail, Mr. Tipton leaves, but not before telling London he is proud of her.

=== Muriel ===
Muriel (played by Estelle Harris; young Muriel played by Ashley Tisdale in flashback in the episode "It's a Mad, Mad, Mad Hotel") is the saucy hotel maid who conceals her goodly nature beneath a veneer of acidic sarcasm, and spends more time sneaking in naps and robbing guests of loose change than doing any actual cleaning. She is a constant presence in Carey and the twins' suite, ostensibly "babysitting" but loitering on their couch watching TV and eating chocolates long after Carey has returned home. In "It's a Mad, Mad, Mad Hotel", the cast discovers that Muriel once dated mobster Alphonse "Hot Peppers" DeLeo before joining the Tipton in 1938; Maddie and the twins easily spot her in an old newspaper clipping when they notice that the young lady in the picture is sitting with her feet up. In "Big Hair & Baseball", Muriel claims that she knew Babe Ruth and was the first one to call him "Babe". Her catchphrase is "I'm not cleaning that up." She was specially called out of retirement in the series finale "Mr. Tipton Comes to Visit", by the twins, when they heard the reason for Mr. Tipton's visit is to fire an employee, in order for her to "get fired" instead (using her catchphrase), sparing the other characters their respective jobs.

=== Nia Moseby ===
Nia Moseby (played by Giovonnie Samuels) is Mr. Moseby's niece. She has a part-time job at the candy counter, filling in for Maddie during her absence. She has come to work at the Tipton so that Mr. Moseby can get her to behave like a responsible girl. One of Nia's aunts, named Aunt Lilly, was supposed to take on this task, but Nia frustrated her so much that she changed her name and moved to Alaska. Nia appeared in seven episodes in Season 3. According to Mr. Moseby, she was expelled from her last school for fighting with the cafeteria lady because she was out of matzo ball soup. In the episode "First Day of High School", she is seen defending Zack from a bully. She is shown to be quite good at cheerleading in the episode "Benchwarmers".

=== Norman ===
Norman (played by Anthony Acker) is the doorman for the Tipton Hotel, Norman's first appearance was in the episode "Free Tippy". He is also usually a background character, but is shown to have a hiding spot for Zack's belongings when he skips school in "What the Hey". Norman has four speaking parts in the episodes, "Neither a Borrower Nor a Speller Bee", "Ask Zack", "Nurse Zack" and "The Arwin That Came For Dinner".

=== Patrick ===
Patrick (played by Patrick Bristow) is the maître d' for the Tipton Hotel's restaurant. One of the most sarcastic characters on the show, he treats everyone with disdain, especially Zack and Cody. However, in "Kisses and Basketball", he says to Zack "Take this from someone who cares about you, she is so out of your league" on Zack's date with Max. He likes coconut flavoured chewing gum, and dislikes Maddie because she does not stock it (as shown in the episode "Big Hair and Baseball"). He is seen in the Tipton Commercial in "Commercial Breaks", and has a girlish shriek, as shown in the episode "Heck's Kitchen". Due to London's generous tips, Patrick has been able to afford a foreign sports car (indicated in "Twins at the Tipton"). However, Mr. Moseby claims that Patrick wrecked it by crashing into fellow waiter Rich, and when the ambulance showed up, another waiter Gary got hit by the ambulance, leaving Mr. Moseby to take Patrick's place at the Tipton Restaurant. His favourite musical is Bye Bye Birdie as revealed in "Birdman of Boston".

=== Chef Paolo ===
Chef Paolo (played by Jerry Kernion) is an Italian-American chef of the Tipton, seen in three episodes: "Heck's Kitchen", "Health and Fitness", and "Foiled Again". He is easily very insulted when people dislike his cooking. He is specialized in Italian food. Paolo enjoys eating, and bacon bits were found in his blood during a cholesterol test. Cody helped Chef Paolo overcome his eating issues in the episode "Health and Fitness". He is close to Cody and refers to him as "my little protege", because of Cody's natural talent for cooking. Paolo has quit his job several times (mostly due to London insulting his food), but always returns eventually. He names almost all of his foods after himself, except for one named after Cody.

=== Irene ===
Irene (played by Sharon Jordan) is the concierge for the Tipton Hotel, Irene is usually seen working in the lobby. She has red curly hair. In "Boston Tea Party", she gets her first speaking part. On "That's So Suite Life of Hannah Montana", Irene told Raven that her flight had been cancelled, much to Raven's dismay. Irene sabotaged Maddie's traveling candy cart in "Nurse Zack", to which Maddie alludes to Irene not having very many speaking parts by replying, "It's always the quiet ones". In "Orchestra", her speaking role was expanded when she had to teach London how to do her job. In "Let Us Entertain You", Mr. Moseby thinks Irene is answering a phone call for their telethon, but she is actually checking her messages.

=== Millicent ===
Millicent (played by Kara Taitz) is Maddie's replacement at the hotel's candy counter while she is at camp and in Antarctica saving the penguins. Millicent is easily frightened by anything, and has trouble making up her mind and make her decision. When she can't make up her mind, she usually faints. She stated in the episode "Team Tipton" that she has trust, abandonment, and fear issues. She frequently faints when overwhelmed with a request from someone else. In the episode "Team Tipton", London referred to her as 'Nervous Maddie'.

=== Skippy ===
Skippy (played by Bo Crutcher) is the night manager of the Tipton Hotel. He grew up on a farm and said his grandfather was scary. He is not very bright, and appears to be frightened of Mr. Moseby. He is so dim-witted that immediately after Mr. Moseby told him not to let Zack or Cody into the exhibit, he let them in anyway. He first appeared in "Scary Movie", but Mr. Moseby called him Sparky, although it is possible that Mr. Moseby did not know his name, because he called him his night-manager while in other episodes he calls him Skippy. Skippy was left in charge of the hotel in the episode "I Want My Mummy". Zack says that Skippy is so nice, that he would give anyone anything if they just asked, even his wallet.

=== Grace ===
Grace (played by Naomi Chan) is an emotionless towel maid at the Tipton who appeared in "Ah! Wilderness" while Carey was painting. In "Orchestra", she is given the name Grace and attempts to teach London how to do her job, Unfortunately, London Tipton accidentally blows the contents of the new vacuum cleaner right into Grace's face.

=== Rich ===
Rich (played by Chris Doyle) is an unfortunate waiter at the Tipton restaurant. He appears in "Odd Couples" and "Heck's Kitchen".

=== Scott ===
Scott is the bagel boy at the Tipton Hotel. He first appears in the episode "Nurse Zack", during the employee of the month competition. His first speaking role comes in "Team Tipton" when he gives the cast bagels, saying: "Who ordered the bagels?"

== Friends of Zack & Cody ==
=== Bob ===
Bob (played by Charlie Stewart) is one of the boys' best friends. He is dyslexic. Zack meets him in school one day when he was moved into a regular class from a special education class because he was doing so well in it. He likes to play Total World Conquest with the boys and Cody's friends, Warren and Jeremy, though they almost never finish their games because Zack and Cody usually end up fighting. Bob, as shown in "Smart & Smarterer" and "Odd Couples", is somewhat impatient. He speaks fluent French, as illustrated in the episode "French 101". In the episode, "Back in the Game", one of his beliefs is frequent, short naps. In "Forever Plaid", he states that his favourite subject is Science. Bob is shown to also be talented in well-made creating a very well made rocking chair. He has a sister, possibly his twin, as shown in "Election", and a younger brother mentioned in "Twins at the Tipton". Bob likes to visits Zack and Cody just because the doorman calls him "sir". He was Puck in the show's version of A Midsummer Night's Dream, is on their basketball team and worked at the boys' club seen in "Club Twin" selling soda. Bob is very vulnerable to poison oak, shown in the episode "Ah! Wilderness". In the episode "Super Twins", he is the first and only child to be adultified by the Meanager (Moseby) – which causes the twins remark later that he has a booming insurance business. However, this is dropped when Zack turns back time at the end of episode. Bob is Zack and Cody's most frequent friend featured on the show with 16 appearances. He visits Zack and Cody on the SS Tipton once in The Suite Life on Deck, which reveals he is now dating Cody's ex-girlfriend Barbara.

=== Max ===
Max (played by Alyson Stoner) is one of Zack and Cody's friends, she is a girl who usually wears pigtails in Season 1 and is sometimes mistaken for a boy. She is a tomboy. She once had a crush on Zack as shown in the episode "Kisses & Basketball", and goes on a date with him while showing her slightly girlie side but "falls out of love" with Zack when she finds out that he just did it to "take one for the team". Max is portrayed as a great dancer (as shown in the episodes "Footloser", "Hotel Hangout", and "Club Twin"), but can become extremely bossy at times ("Footloser"). Max has appeared in six episodes through 2 seasons.

=== Tapeworm ===
Tapeworm (played by Dennis Bendersky) is one of Zack and Cody's friends, Tapeworm received his nickname when he ate 20 hot dogs in 2 minutes (beating Cody's record by 18 hot dogs). His real name is unknown. He is strange and a math genius. In the episode "Band in Boston", he was the drummer for "Rock Squared". In "Hotel Hangout", Mr. Moseby and Drew repeatedly call him by the wrong name, such as ringworm and earthworm. He gets unhappy when people don't call him the right name. In total, Tapeworm made four appearances, but was not seen after Season 1.

=== Jessica and Janice ===
Jessica and Janice (both played by Camilla and Rebecca Rosso) are English twins. After they visited the Tipton in Boston for a twin convention (as seen in "Twins at the Tipton") they enrolled in Zack and Cody's school. Cody always ends up getting both girls for his sensitivity, while Zack gets neither (except in "Lost in Translation"), even though it is generally his idea to go out with them in the first place. They appeared in Season 3 in "Benchwarmers". All together, they have appeared in seven episodes. In "The Suite Life on Deck" episode, "Model Behavior" both girls are working as models. Janice shows interest in Zack but, due to Zack not realizing it, she ends up dating Woody Fink instead. Jessica, on the other hand, becomes friends with Bailey Pickett despite Cody thinking that Bailey is jealous of her.

=== Barbara ===
Barbara Simka Brownstein (played by Sophie Tamiko Oda) is a Japanese American, Jewish girl who dates Cody. She entered a science contest in "Rock Star in the House", in which her volcano was dormant and was set off by Cody's/Arwin's laser, entered a spelling bee in "Neither a Borrower Nor a Speller Bee", where she misspelled fracas and was eliminated, and worked on the school paper in the episode "Ask Zack". In the episode "Club Twin", she becomes addicted to sugar and kisses Cody, and later goes on a date with him in "Miniature Golf" and "A Tale of Two Houses". She also speaks Yiddish, but she is also into Japanese culture, her grandmother and some relatives are from Japan. It is mentioned that she is Jewish in "Miniature Golf". She gives Cody an amazing protractor and says with a smile, "I got it for Hanukkah', and in "Club Twin" when she said "...and my Bat Mitzvah lessons". Barbara is very academically competitive, as shown in "Graduation" and "Benchwarmers", and her favourite subject is A.P. Chemistry. She and Cody confessed their love for each other in the episode "Orchestra" and kissed on stage. Her full name was stated in this episode when Cody was mad at her because of Sergei. She has since been in ten episodes in the whole series. Barbara's last appearance was in "Benchwarmers", but production code wise is "Romancing the Phone". Barbara began dating Bob when Cody decided to attend school on the SS Tipton. She visited the ship in The Suite Life on Deck in the episode "Flowers and Chocolate".

=== Agnes ===
Agnes (played by Allie Grant) is a girl who goes to school with Zack and Cody and has a crush on both of them and often attempts to win their affections, behaving aggressively towards girls whom share her competition. She often says "Agnes Likes". Agnes makes five appearances in the whole series. She has adopted fond names for Zack such as "Zackie-Poo", to Zack's annoyance, and thus embarrassing him in the process.

=== Warren ===
Warren (played by Gus Hoffman) is a friend of Zack and Cody from school. Warren attends Camp Knock-a-Number along with Cody and Tapeworm in "Cody Goes to Camp". He is also in the Grizzly Scouts along with Zack, Cody and Bob, with Mr. Moseby as their scout leader. Warren made four appearances, but was not seen after Season 2.

=== Mark ===
Mark (played by Tyler Steelman) was first introduced in Season 2 "Club Twin" where he attended Zack and Cody's Club, "Club Twin". In season 3, he went to summer school with Zack in "Summer of Our Discontent". He is shown as nervous, and has problems making up his mind. On a test, he circled A, B, C, and D for each question. In "First Day of High School", Mark announced that he knows Taekwondo and takes classes at the Tae Kwon Deli but chooses to be a "nerd". His girlfriend is a model.

=== Theo ===
Theo Cavanaugh (played by Mike Weinberg) – A snobby rich kid who likes Zack but dislikes Cody. Theo and Zack do many things together such as attending basketball games. Theo later tries to get Zack to illegally record a The Black Eyed Peas concert. Zack ends their friendship because of this and the fact that he is loyal to his brother.

=== Haley ===
Haley (played by Tara Lynne Barr) first appears in the Season 3 episode "Summer of Our Discontent" as one of Zack's summer school classmates. She is a very shy girl who frequently puts a bag over her head to hide. She reappears in the episode "Benchwarmers" as one of the "loser squad" cheerleaders. She claims that her talent is hiding and she once went four weeks without anyone finding her; however, Nia pointed out that no one was probably bothering to search for her.

== Our Lady of Perpetual Sorrow staff and students ==
=== Sister Dominick ===
Sister Dominick (played by Marianne Muellerleile) is Maddie and London's strict teacher who works at Our Lady of Perpetual Sorrow. She is first seen in season 2 and is a nun who teaches. She seems to favour London over Maddie, even though Maddie is the harder working student. Even though she called out London for being spoiled in "Forever Plaid", she seems to be more lenient towards London while coming down more harshly on Maddie. Her cell phone's ring-tone is "Hallelujah Chorus", to which she answers, "Bless you for calling". It has been revealed that she and the other nuns are infatuated with wrestling, and that Sister Dominick herself has a "mean body slam" in the episode "What the Hey". When she gets Maddie to attend Camp Heaven on Earth as a counselor, it is revealed that she owns a motorcycle and searches the campers in the fashion of a prison warden.

=== Mary–Margaret ===
Mary–Margaret (played by Monique Coleman) is Maddie's friend from school. Not much is known about her, except she's smart and only likes London for her money and possessions. When she first met London, she initially seemed to be annoyed, as shown in "A Prom Story", but in "Forever Plaid" and "Not So Suite 16", she appeared to be London's friend. Mary–Margaret is on Maddie's volleyball team along with London and Leslie, as shown in "Volley Dad".

=== Corrie ===
Corrie (played by Vanessa Hudgens) is a schoolmate of Maddie, Mary-Margaret, and her idol London at Our Lady of Perpetual Sorrow. She is very perky, obsessed with London, and not very bright.

=== Leslie ===
Leslie (played by Kaycee Stroh) is a classmate of London, Maddie, Mary–Margaret, and Corrie and on the volleyball team with them. Leslie is bright, bubbly, and eager to see people happy. She is seen transferring to Cheevers High School in "Bench Warmers", and is made fun of by the cheerleading captain who makes the comment of: "Now I see why she (Our Lady of Perpetual Sorrow) was so sad". Her best subject in school is organic Chemistry. She makes an appearance in a few episodes.

== Other ==
=== Kurt Martin ===
Kurt Martin (played by Robert Torti) is Zack and Cody's father, and Carey's ex-husband who first appears in "Dad's Back". He is known as the more fun and spontaneous parent and plays a red Fender Precision Bass in a rock band in which he leads. He is also seen in "Christmas at the Tipton" where he was going on a trip with Zack and Cody without Carey and ends up being snowed in at the Tipton. Cody thought they were getting back together but they are never getting back together. He and Carey sang at the Tipton and helped deliver a baby. He is also seen in "Volley Dad" where Cody asked him to stop Carey from being all over a new boyfriend. He is back in the season 3 episode: "Graduation" for Zack and Cody. He also appears in the episode "A Tale of Two Houses". Kurt appears in 5 episodes throughout the series. He appears later in The Suite Life on Deck in the episode "Mom and Dad on Deck" as well as in the series finale "Graduation on Deck".

=== Ilsa ===
Ilsa Shickelgrubermeiger (played by Caroline Rhea) is the mean-spirited German hotel inspector-turned-manager of the rival hotel, the St. Mark Hotel, across the street. She is a rude and severe woman with a large mole (or "beauty mark") on her face (which is oblivious to her, as she usually replies "Vat mole?"), who dislikes Mr. Moseby for making her lose her hotel inspector's job. After "Hotel Inspector", she got married. In "Cookin' With Romeo and Juliet" she says her name is Ilsa Shickelgrubermeiger-Von Helsinger Kepelugerhoffer. When Cody mentions that it must take forever to write on her underwear, she says she has a stamp. One of her dreams is to turn the Tipton Hotel into a parking lot, and have Mr. Moseby park the cars. In "Bowling", it appears that she has an odd sense of humor, as she says, "Left! Left! Left my husband with 28 kids! Right! Right! Right in the middle of the living room floor!" Some parts of her personality seem to be reminiscent of the Wicked Witch of the West from The Wizard of Oz; for instance, in the episode "Bowling" she states, "I'll get you next time, my pretty, and your little shtaff too!" She also uses the line, "I'll get you next time and your little dog too', in the episode "Hotel Inspector". In the episode "Bowling", Mr. Moseby makes a reference to The Biggest Loser, the show Caroline Rhea hosted, by saying "Ha! Who's the biggest loser now!" Also in that episode, she actually compliments Carrie on her parenting skills by keeping Zack off the team as punishment for pranking Cody; however, she then follows it up with the insult that it's also bad coaching as Zack's the second-best bowler the Tipton team had. It is mentioned in a few episodes that she has a sausage dog named Blitzkrieg, who is rather vicious, merciless, and sadistic. London likened the dog to a piranha. Everyone is afraid of her and constantly stares at her mole.

=== The Mirrors ===
The Mirrors (voiced by Brian Peck and Jim Meskimen in the original series; and Michael Airington in the sequel series) are London's free-standing talking mirrors (it was mentioned that there are more than one). They first appeared in the season 2 crossover episode "That's So Suite Life of Hannah Montana". London stated that the mirrors were engineered by her father's scientists, and that they are programmed to only compliment her fashion while giving snobby fashion insults to others who stand in front of them. The mirror sounds like Paul Lynde who played Uncle Arthur in the series Bewitched. It is implied several times that the mirrors have artificial intelligence, as they regularly make sarcastic comments about London's intelligence. The Mirror is a parody of the Magic Mirror used by the Evil Queen from the fairy tale "Snow White". The Mirror re-appears in the Suite Life on Deck season 3 episode "A London Carol" representing the Ghosts of Christmas Past, Present and Future in London's dream and also in the Suite Life On Deck season 2 episode "Once Upon a Suite Life" literally as the Magic Mirror from Snow White.

=== George ===
Mr. George Forgess (played by Ernie Grunwald) is one of Zack and Cody's teachers from "Smart & Smarterer". He is often shown as a nervous character and frequently stumbles over his words. It may be possible that he is dyslexic, like his special education student Bob, a friend of the twins. He later appears in "A Midsummer's Nightmare" as runner of the drama club, and in "Graduation" as the head of Zack and Cody's graduation. Mr. Forgess claims he drives his mother's car, which he says has chrome spinners. Mr. Forgess has appeared in three episodes throughout the series.

=== Snooty ===
Snooty Saleswoman (played by Donna Cherry) appears in "Not So Suite 16" and "What the Hey". Snooty works in the jewelry and clothing department of a store. She dislikes the twins, and worships London Tipton. An example of her London worship is the time she insulted and patronized Carey until she found out that Carey knew London. The Snooty Saleswoman has appeared in two episodes throughout the series.

=== Portia ===
Portia Tenenbaum is the never seen, rich frenemy of London. In some episodes, they are friends and in other episodes, they are competitors. The two speak by telephone and go on shopping trips together (most of the time to Paris). In the episode "Neither a Borrower Nor a Speller Bee", Portia had gained publicity doing charity works. London also competes with her for more fame on the Internet with her own web show called "Yay Me! Starring London Tipton". In "Cody Goes to Camp" Mr. Moseby was horrified at the thought that Portia might teach London how to drive as she once drove her father's yacht through piers 10, 11 and 12, because of being distracted putting on sunscreen. She is never seen.

=== Arturo Vitali ===
Arturo Vitali is a fictitious famous fashion designer who is mentioned multiple times in the Suite Life franchise. He happens to be London's favourite designer, as she has been wearing his designs since she was in diapers, and only wears his designs. In The Suite Life of Zack & Cody crossover episode "That's So Suite Life of Hannah Montana", Maddie and Esteban switched the labels of one of Vitali's dresses (incorrectly spelled as A. Vitalli) and Raven Baxter's dress, to fool London into thinking she was wearing Vitali's design (but actually it was Raven's), since London was being a fashion-snob. Arturo Vitali finally made an appearance in The Suite Life on Deck episode "Frozen" (portrayed by Todd Sherry), where he retired to the SS Tipton because he was suffering from a creative block. London and Bailey eventually helped him overcome his creative block and inspired him to launch a new fashion line "Hick Chic" (inspired by Bailey's wardrobe), much to London's chagrin, who doesn't like Bailey's clothes. He is mentioned by Emma Ross in the season 2 episodes of Jessie "Trashin' Fashion", and then again in "Say Yes to the Messy Dress" where he sent Emma one of his designs for Jessie Prescott to wear at a red carpet event, which Emma would be covering on her hit fashion web-show "Kitty Couture".

=== Tiffany and Chelsea ===
Tiffany (played by Alexa Nikolas) and Chelsea (played by Brittany Curran) are two wealthy friends of London. They are not too bright and sometimes, even more superficial than London is. It has been mentioned that they both have had several nose jobs. Chelsea says that she does not drive her car because bugs can get into the windshield. They both appear in "Miniature Golf" as part of London's so-called book club and in "Who's the Boss?" while Chelsea was in the episode "Tiptonline" as a guest and temporary producer on London's web show "Yay Me". In "Who's the Boss" they have British accents. Tiffany has appeared in two episodes throughout the series, and Chelsea has been in three. Chelsea visits London on the SS Tipton in The Suite Life on Deck, assuming that London has been continuing her glamorous, rich lifestyle on the ship and unaware that she is actually attending sea school (which London tries to hide from her).

=== Holly ===
Holly O'Neil (played by Sammi Hanratty) – First appeared in "Have a Nice Trip", Holly is the child of a conman named Harry O'Neil (played by Eric Lutes), and later went to "Camp Heaven On Earth". Like her father, Holly enjoys conning – during the events of "Have a Nice Trip", she conned Zack, Maddie, Cody, and various Tipton staff members while Harry feigned a back injury after she made him trip on Zack's skateboard so they could get free service, but the father/daughter con artist duo was later exposed. During her time at camp, as revealed in "Graduation", Holly is living with neighbors while Harry is serving 3 to 5 years in prison. Holly has appeared in six episodes throughout the series.

=== Jasmine ===
Jasmine (played by Cierra Ramirez) – Was at "Camp Heaven On Earth" with Maddie. She has anger issues and a dislike for Amy. She also said that she lived in a one-bedroom apartment with her five brothers & sisters, and that all of them had to share one toothbrush. Jasmine appeared in three episodes in the series. like Amy and the other girls, she can even whistle. as seen in the season three episode: Sink or Swim.

=== Amy ===
Amy (played by Hannah Leigh Dworkin) – Was at "Camp Heaven On Earth" with Maddie. She tends to have a habit of lying and stealing. In "Sink or Swim", she told the truth and said, "it felt kinda good". She has claimed that she lives with wolves, that aliens abducted her, that her ex-boyfriend was Justin Timberlake, and that she was once married, but they were separated. Amy appears in four episodes in the series. like Jasmine and the other girls, she can also even whistle. also as seen in the season three episode: Sink or Swim.

=== Leah ===
Leah (played by Jaelin Palmer) – Was at "Camp Heaven On Earth" with Maddie; she was mistaken for a co-counselor due to her height, bringing her actual age into question. Leah does not talk very often, but does like to sing especially the song "If Your Happy and You Know It" that she sings a verse of in one episode. She often wears black and states in one episode that her favorite shade of lipstick is "Kiss Me Charcoal". She has stated she uses her grandmother's finger as a toothbrush. Leah appears in four episodes in the series.

=== Wayne ===
Wayne Wormser (played by Jareb Dauplaise) works as the Assistant Manager at the Paul Revere Mini-Market with Zack and Cody. He is often known for his odd doings and being full of himself. Wayne has a huge crush on London.

== Animals ==
While some of these animals appeared in only one episode, and therefore weren't physically recurring, they were mentioned in several episodes so their characters were recurring. For this reason they are included in this article.

Dudley is Esteban's pet chicken. He appeared on the episode "Commercial Breaks". After that, Esteban mentions him in some episodes. He appeared again on "The Suite Life on Deck" in the episode "Mother of the Groom".

Scamp (voiced by Carlos Alazraqui) is Maddie's pet dog. In the episode "Crushed", he and Ivana, London's dog, fall in love and Ivana has six puppies. When "talking" to Ivana he notes that he has one flea but it is only there on weekends.

Ivana (voiced by Emma Stone) is London's spoiled dog. She is a Pomeranian, and appears to be a lot smarter than London. In the episode "Crushed", she and Scamp, Maddie's dog, fall in love and she has six puppies. She is a parody of Tinkerbell Hilton.

Bonnie and Clyde are two rats that Zack and Cody used in a science project. Named after the infamous bank robbers Bonnie Parker and Clyde Barrow.

Tippy is the horse that pulls the carriage around the hotel. He was almost gotten rid of in one episode, "Free Tippy".

== Notable guest stars ==
- Kathryn Joosten as Maddie's Grandma
- Emma Stone as Ivana Tipton (voice)
- Moisés Arias as Randall
- Chris Brown as himself
- The Cheetah Girls (Adrienne Bailon, Sabrina Bryan, and Kiely Williams) as themselves
- Monique Coleman as Mary–Margaret
- Miley Cyrus as Hannah Montana
- Michael Clarke Duncan as Coach Little
- Zac Efron as Trevor
- Gage Golightly as Vanessa
- Selena Gomez as Gwen
- Vanessa Hudgens as Corrie
- Victoria Justice as Rebecca
- Nathan Kress as Jamie
- Meaghan Martin as Stacey
- Jesse McCartney as himself
- Tahj Mowry as Brandon
- Kathy Najimy as Principal Miletitch
- Kay Panabaker as Amber
- Tom Poston as Merle (last acting role before his death)
- Drew Seeley as Jeffrey
- Jaden Smith as Travis
- Raven-Symoné as Raven Baxter
- Daniella Monet as Dana
- Tony Hawk as himself
- Mary Scheer as Laura Bird

== Character appearances ==
This table lists recurring characters, recording the number of appearances in each season. They are listed in order of first appearance.

Characters	Played By	Season 1	Season 2	Season 3	Total
Esteban Ramírez	Adrian R'Mante	15	17	5	37
Lance Fishman	Aaron Musicant	3	3	4	10
Max	Alyson Stoner	4	2	0	6
Tapeworm	Dennis Bendersky	4	0	0	4
Muriel	Estelle Harris	13	0	1	14
Ilsa Shickelgrubermeiger- Von Helsinger Kepelugerhoffer	Caroline Rhea	2	1	0	3
Arwin Hawkhauser	Brian Stepanek	8	12	7	27
Mary Margaret	Monique Coleman	1	5	0	6
Warren	Gus Hoffman	1	2	0	3
Patrick	Patrick Bristow	4	4	1	9
Barbara Brownstein	Sophie Oda	1	4	5	10
Bob	Charlie Stewart	1	13	2	16
Mr. Forgess	Ernie Grunwald	1	1	1	3
Kurt Martin	Robert Torti	3	1	2	6
Agnes	Allie Grant	1	3	0	4
Rich the waiter	Chris Doyle	0	2	0	2
Chef Paolo	Jerry Kernion	0	2	1	3
Norman the Doorman	Anthony Acker	0	8	3	11
Sister Dominick	Marianne Muellerleile	0	4	1	5
Corrie	Vanessa Hudgens	0	4	0	4
Jessica & Janice	Camilla & Rebecca Rosso	0	6	1	7
Irene the Concierge	Sharon Jordan	0	3	3	6
Holly	Sammi Hanratty	0	1	4	5
Leslie	Kaycee Stroh	0	1	1	2
Skippy	Bo Crutcher	0	2	3	5
Grace the maid	Naomi Chan	0	1	1	2
Mark	Tyler Steelman	0	1	3	4
Chelsea	Brittany Curran	0	1	2	3
Tiffany	Alexa Nikolas	0	1	1	2
Jasmine	Cierra Ramirez	0	0	4	4
Amy	Hannah Leigh Dworkin	0	0	4	4
Leah	Jaelin Palmer	0	0	4	4
Wayne Wormser	Jareb Dauplaise	0	0	4	4
Millicent	Kara Taitz	0	0	4	4
Haley	Tara Lynne Barr	0	0	2	2
Nia Moseby	Giovonnie Samuels	0	0	7	7
