= The Rosso Sisters =

Musical group

- Origin: Los Angeles, California, United States
- Genres: Pop, dance-pop, teen pop
- Years active: 2013–2014
- Labels: Virgin Records, Capitol Records
- Past members: Georgina Rosso; Milly Rosso; Becky Rosso; Lola Rosso
- Website: therossosisters.com

The Rosso Sisters was an American musical group, made up of four expatriate siblings originally from the United Kingdom: Georgina, Milly, Becky, and Lola.

The group was signed to Virgin Records's Capitol Records label in the beginning of 2014. Later that year, they opened for Demi Lovato on the South American leg of her Neon Lights Tour.

The group announced their disbandment in February 2015, due to their mother's death.

== History ==
=== 2013–15: The Rosso Sisters ===
Group was formed in 2013 by sisters Georgina (b. 1991), twins Milly and Becky (b. 1994) and Lola Rosso (b. 1996). Their oldest sister Bianca wasn't a part of the band. Milly and Becky already had an acting career between 2006 and 2010 and recorded song "Lucky Girl" for their film Legally Blondes (2009).

They were signed by Virgin Records in 2014 by Steve Barnett and were managed by Paul Kevin Jonas, Sr., the father of the Jonas Brothers. They were chosen to be an opening act for Demi Lovato's Neon Lights Tour in South America. Their debut extended play Hola Hola was released on April 22, 2014. It was promoted on Neon Lights Tour and produced single "Hola Hola". Another single "I Like Boys" was released same year. After the tour ended, no new music was released, except for song "Waterloo" released on the ABBA tribute album Dancing Queens, released on 9 September 2014.

In November 2014, the sisters stated that their mother Anthea had cancer. After their mother died, the group announced their disbandment on February 12, 2015.

== Discography ==
=== Extended plays ===
- Hola Hola (2014)

=== Singles ===
- "Hola Hola" (2014)
- "I Like Boys" (2014)

=== Other songs ===
- "Waterloo" (2014)
- "Wasteland" (2014)
- "I'm Single, Bilingual and Ready To Mingle" (2014)

== Concert tours ==
Opening act

- The Neon Lights Tour (2014)

== See also ==
- Camilla and Rebecca Rosso
- List of vocal groups
