= Camilla and Rebecca Rosso =

British-American-Latina twin actresses and singers (born 1994)

Milly and Becky Rosso
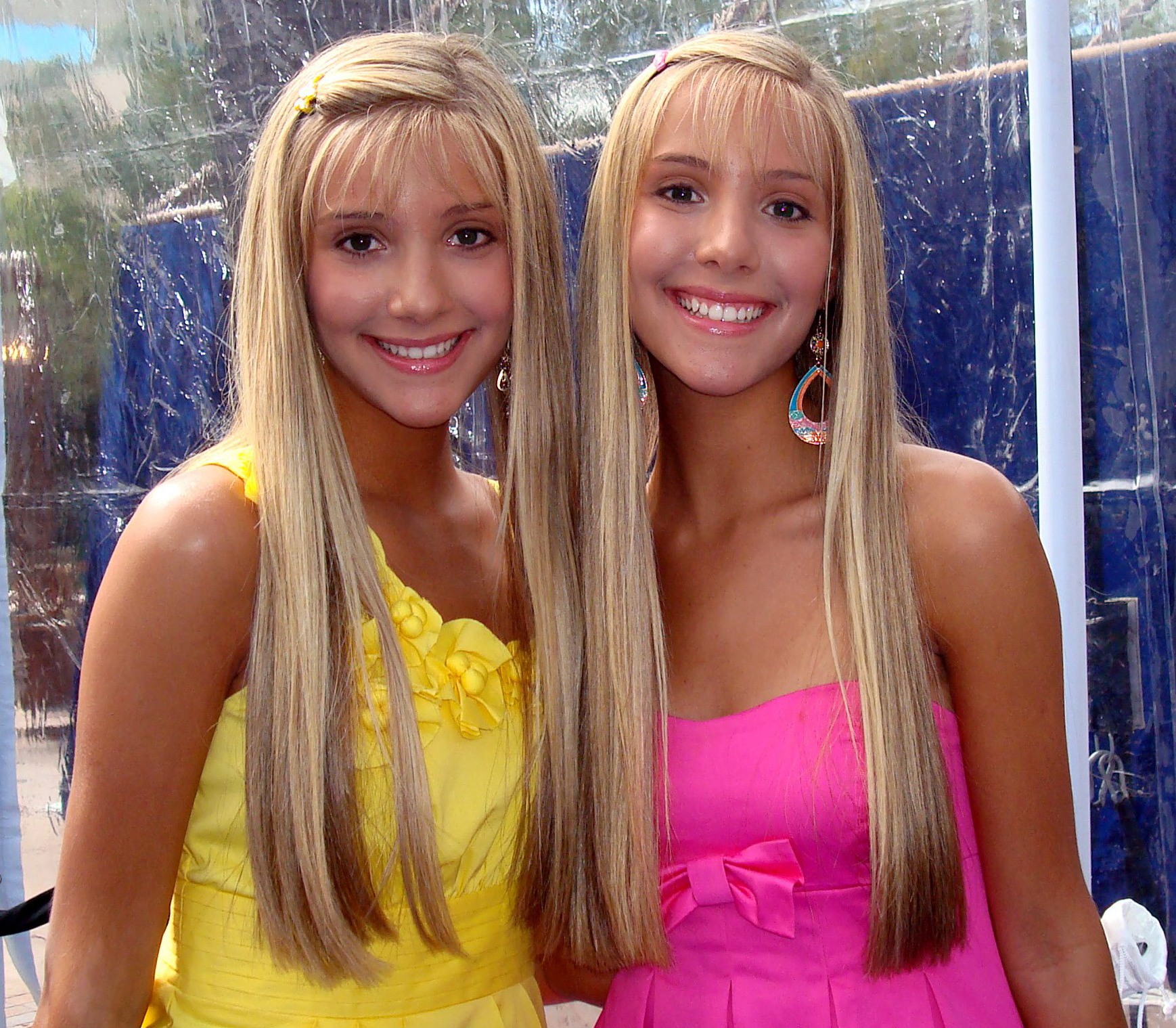
- The Rossos in March 2009.
- Born: Camilla and Rebecca Rosso; 6 July 1994 (age 32); England, United Kingdom
- Occupations: Actresses; singers
- Years active: 2006–2014
- Website: Official MySpace at the Wayback Machine (archived 9 November 2013)

Camilla "Milly" Rosso and Rebecca "Becky" Rosso (born 6 July 1994) are British-American identical twin former actresses and singers from London. They are best known for their roles as Janice (Milly) and Jessica (Becky) Ellis on The Suite Life of Zack & Cody, and for their roles as Annabelle "Annie" (Milly) and Isabelle "Izzy" (Becky) Woods in Legally Blondes (2009).

== Early life ==
Milly is a minute younger than Becky. They are of English descent through their mother and Argentine descent through their father. They have lived in Latin American countries such as Colombia, Argentina, and Venezuela.

== Careers ==
Milly and Becky were discovered when they were picked out of the audience by one of the executive producers of The Suite Life of Zack & Cody at a live taping of the show. They appeared in a total of seven episodes of the show and then appeared in one episode of the spin-off The Suite Life on Deck in March 2010.

The twins starred as the main roles in the film Legally Blondes, which was released direct-to-DVD on 28 April 2009 as a sequel to Legally Blonde. They sang "Lucky Girl" for the film. Legally Blondes was produced by Reese Witherspoon, the star of the original Legally Blonde. They starred in a pilot episode for Suburban Legends, which was not picked up as a series ultimately.

Milly and Becky were part of an all-girl group called The Rosso Sisters, along with their sisters, Georgina and Lola. Their eldest sister, Bianca Rosso, did not join the group. They were signed by Virgin Records on the spot by Steve Barnett and were managed by Paul Kevin Jonas Sr., the father of the Jonas Brothers. In 2015, they announced on their Facebook and Instagram accounts the disbandment of their group due to the passing of their mother and have since retired from the entertainment industry.

== Personal lives ==
Rebecca changed careers to work in UI/UX design in California and married her husband, Ben, in 2018. Camilla served as the maid of honour. Camilla is also married and maintains a private profile.

== Filmography ==
Television

Year	Title	Milly's role	Becky's role	Notes
2005	That's So Raven	Chrissette #1	Chrissette #2	Episode: "Goin' Hollywood"
2006–2008	The Suite Life of Zack & Cody	Jessica Ellis	Janice Ellis	Recurring role (seasons 2–3)
2009	Suburban Legends	Concertgoers		Episode: "Pilot"
2010	The Suite Life on Deck	Jessica Ellis	Janice Ellis	Episode: "Model Behavior"

Film

Year	Title	Milly's role	Becky's role	Notes
2009	Legally Blondes	Annabelle "Annie" Woods	Isabelle "Izzy" Woods	Direct-to-video
