= Brian Stepanek =

American actor and comedian (born 1971)

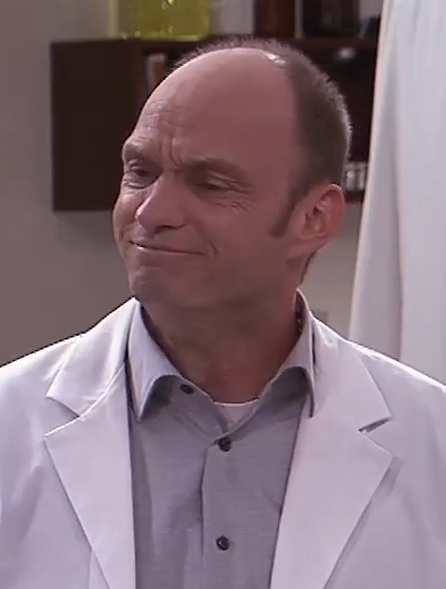
- Stepanek on an episode of Mr. Young in 2011
- Born: Brian Patrick Stepanek; February 6, 1971 (age 55); Cleveland, Ohio, U.S.
- Occupations: Actor; comedian
- Years active: 2000–present
- Spouse: Parisa Stepanek (m. 2002)
- Children: 3

Brian Patrick Stepanek (born February 6, 1971) is an American actor and comedian known for his role as Arwin Hochhauser on the Disney Channel original series The Suite Life of Zack & Cody and Brian on Brian O'Brian. He was also a Sector Seven Agent in the 2007 Michael Bay film Transformers, played Sheldon’s high school science teacher, Mr. Givens, in the show Young Sheldon, and also had a supporting role in The Island. Stepanek is also known as the voice of Roger in Father of the Pride and played Tom Harper on the Nickelodeon series Nicky, Ricky, Dicky & Dawn from 2014 to 2018. Since 2016, he has played Lynn Loud Sr. in the Nickelodeon franchise The Loud House.

== Early life ==
Stepanek was born Brian Patrick Stepanek on February 6, 1971 in Cleveland, Ohio to Connie (née Gleason) and William J. Stepanek (1930–2022). He has four brothers and one sister.

== Career ==
Stepanek is known for his role as Arwin in the Disney Channel sitcom The Suite Life of Zack & Cody. He appeared in the 2005 film The Island.

Stepanek has done additional voiceovers in the movies Lemony Snicket's A Series of Unfortunate Events, Kim Possible, Charlotte's Web and Over the Hedge. He voiced Roger in Father of the Pride. He appeared in the sitcoms What I Like About You and Malcolm in the Middle. He was a co-host for the first Disney Channel Games. Stepanek portrayed the popular Batman villain, The Riddler on one of the Batman OnStar commercials. Stepanek can also be seen as the bank manager in the Disney direct-to-DVD movie Beverly Hills Chihuahua 2.

In 2008, he voiced Martin in the movie Bolt. He was an uncredited policeman in Friday After Next. He has his first voice role in The Secret Saturdays as Agent Epsilon. Brian voices Kick, Brad and Brianna's father, Harold Buttowski on the Disney XD animated series Kick Buttowski.

Stepanek starred in a series of shorts that aired on Disney Channel called Brian O'Brian, which was a silent slapstick-style series and which was filmed in Milan, Italy. He starred in the Disney Channel Original Movie Hatching Pete as the Coach Mackay, and Mostly Ghostly as Phears. He reprised his role as Arwin for three episodes of The Suite Life on Deck. He made an appearance in season 9, episode 19 of Two and a Half Men. Stepanek starred in Mr. Young as Adam's university professor, Dr. Fenway.

From 2014 to 2018, Stepanek portrayed Tom Harper in the Nickelodeon television series Nicky, Ricky, Dicky & Dawn, the father of the title quadruplets. In 2015, he appeared in the animated film Home voicing several roles, including the Gorg Commander.

In 2016, he began voicing family patriarch Lynn Loud Sr. on the Nicktoon The Loud House and reprised the role in its spinoff The Casagrandes as a guest star and the feature film The Loud House Movie. He also physically portrays Lynn Sr. in the live-action television film A Loud House Christmas and its follow-up series The Really Loud House.

== Personal life ==
Stepanek was born and raised in Cleveland, Ohio; from 1985 to 1989, he attended Gilmour Academy, and went on to attend Syracuse University. Since 2002, he has been married to Parisa Stepanek, and together, they have three children.

== Filmography ==
=== Film ===
Year	Title	Role	Notes
2002	Friday After Next	Officer #3	
2005	The Island	Gandu Three Echo	
2006	Charlotte's Web	Sheep Group	Voice role
2006	Over the Hedge	Nugent	Voice role
2007	Transformers	Sector Seven Agent	
2008	Bolt	Martin	Voice role
2008	Mostly Ghostly: Who Let the Ghosts Out?	Phears	Direct-to-video film
2011	Monster Mutt	Dr. Victor Lloyd	
2011	Beverly Hills Chihuahua 2	Banker	
2013	Pain & Gain	Brad McCalister	
2014	Jingle All the Way 2	Victor	Direct-to-video film
2014	The Little Rascals Save The Day	Sergio	Direct-to-video film
2015	Home	Gorg Commander / Boovs	Voice roles
2016	LBJ	Rufus Youngblood	
2018	Daphne & Velma	Nedley Blake	Direct-to-video film
2018	Green Book	Graham Kindell	
2021	The Loud House Movie	Lynn Loud Sr. / 1600s Lynn Sr.	Voice roles; direct-to-streaming film
2024	No Time to Spy: A Loud House Movie	Lynn Loud Sr. / Robot Todd / Cargo Shorts Henchman	Voice roles; direct-to-streaming film
2025	A Loud House Christmas Movie: Naughty or Nice	Lynn Loud Sr. / Robot Todd / Astronaut #1	Voice roles; direct-to-streaming film

=== Television ===
Year	Title	Role	Notes
2000	The West Wing	Senator's Aide	Episode: "The Lame Duck Congress"
2002	What I Like About You	Lowell	Episode: "Holly's First Job"
2002	JAG	Lt. Murtaugh	Episode: "Offensive Action"
2002	The Drew Carey Show	Bob	Episode: "The Dawn Patrol"
2003	Malcolm in the Middle	Stan	Episode: "Baby: Part 1"
2003	Six Feet Under	Alex Graham	Episode: "The Opening"
2004–2005	Father of the Pride	Roger	Recurring voice role
2005	CSI: Miami	Andrew Stamler	Episode: "Money Plane"
2005–2008	The Suite Life of Zack & Cody	Arwin Hochhauser	Recurring role, 27 episodes
2006–2008	Disney Channel Games	Himself	Host
2007	Kim Possible	Mathter	Voice role; episode: "Mathter and Fervent"
2008	The Secret Saturdays	Agent Epsilon	Voice role; episode: "Paris Is Melting"
2008	Brian O' Brian	Brian	Lead role
2008–2011	The Suite Life on Deck	Arwin Hochhauser / Milos	3 episodes
2009	Hatching Pete	Coach Mackey	Television film
2009	Phineas and Ferb	Mr. McGillicuddy	Voice role; 2 episodes
2010–2011	Imagination Movers	Sir Fears-a-Lot / Pete the Plumber	Episodes: "Knight Time", "Haunted Halloween"
2010–2012	Kick Buttowski: Suburban Daredevil	Harold Buttowski / Various voices	Recurring voice role
2011	Mr. Young	Professor	3 episodes
2012	The Penguins of Madagascar	Dode	Voice role; episode: "Endangerous Species"
2012–2013	Two and a Half Men	Arthur	Episodes: "Palmdale, Ech", "Mr. Walden, He Die. I Clean Room."
2013	Major Crimes	Mark Vogel	Episode: "I, witness"
2013	The Crazy Ones	Phil	Episode: "The Intern"
2014	Jessie	Mr. Collinsworth	Episode: "Hoedown Showdown"
2014	Mixels	Magnifo	Voice role; episode: "Mixed Up Special"
2014	Mom	Fred	Episode: "Sonograms and Tube Tops"
2014–2015	The Haunted Hathaways	Officer GooseBump	3 episodes
2014–2018	Nicky, Ricky, Dicky & Dawn	Tom Harper	Main role; directed 4 episodes
2016	The Middle	Merv	Episode: "Crushed"
2016–present	The Loud House	Lynn Loud Sr. / Robot Todd / Various voices	Main voice role
2017–2024	Young Sheldon	Mr. Givens	Recurring role, 21 episodes
2017	Longmire	Jay Purcell	Episode: "Fever"
2018	The Thundermans	Professor Meteor	Episode: "The Thundredth"
2019	I'm Sorry	Mr. Castellotti	4 episodes
2019	For All Mankind	Shorty Powers	2 episodes
2019–2020	Team Kaylie	Officer Stevie	4 episodes
2020	Outmatched	Mr. Turpel	Episode: "Bullying"
2020–2022	The Casagrandes	Lynn Loud Sr. / Various voices	Voice role; 3 episodes
2020	NCIS	Chunk	Episode: "Sturgeon Season"
2021	A Loud House Christmas	Lynn Loud Sr.	Television film
2022–2024	The Really Loud House	Lynn Loud Sr. / Robot Todd	Main role; voice role
2023	A Really Haunted Loud House	Lynn Loud Sr. / Robot Todd	Television film
2024–2026	Max & the Midknights	King Gastley Pendragon	Main voice role
2026	The Rookie	City Attorney	Episode: "Out of Time"
2026	Tracker	Elias Williams	Episode: "Purification"
