= Kara Taitz =

American actress (born 1981)

- Born: May 11, 1981 (age 44); New York City, New York, U.S.
- Occupation: Actress
- Years active: 2007–2013

Kara Eve Taitz (born May 11, 1981) is an American former actress, who starred as Lily Miran, a socially awkward and sex-crazed girl who has feelings for the main character on the sitcom The Hard Times of RJ Berger. Her on-screen debut was as Millicent, a recurring character on The Suite Life of Zack & Cody. Millicent was a quirky candy counter girl who often fainted out of panic.

Other appearances include episodes of Samantha Who?, where she appeared in 2007 after graduating Tisch School of the Arts, Wizards of Waverly Place and the USA television-movie Operating Instructions as Christine Lahti's meek, lovestruck assistant.

In 2013, she retired from acting, and pursued an MBA from Eastern Washington University, and currently works in customer service.

== Early life ==
Born and raised in New York City, New York, Taitz developed a knack for performing in early childhood. According to MTV's official website, she "sang before she could talk." Taitz attended Fiorello H. LaGuardia High School (New York's High School for the Performing Arts), where she produced a student drama festival, and NYU's Tisch School of the Arts.

In 2003, she was the lead actress in the play "Til Death Do Us Part," by Jay C. Rehak.

== Filmography ==
Year	Title	Role	Notes
2007	The Suite Life of Zack & Cody	Millicent	4 episodes
2007	Samantha Who?	Bridesmaid	Episode: "The Wediing"
2008	Wizards of Waverly Place	Guinea Pig #1	Episode: "Report Card"
2009	Operating Instructions	Marie Krastack	TV movie
2010–2011	The Hard Times of RJ Berger	Lily Miran	Main role
2012	Raising Hope	Natalie	Episode: "Poking Holes in the Story"
2013	The Secret Lives of Dorks	Bernice	Film
