= Monique Coleman =

American actress (b. 1980)

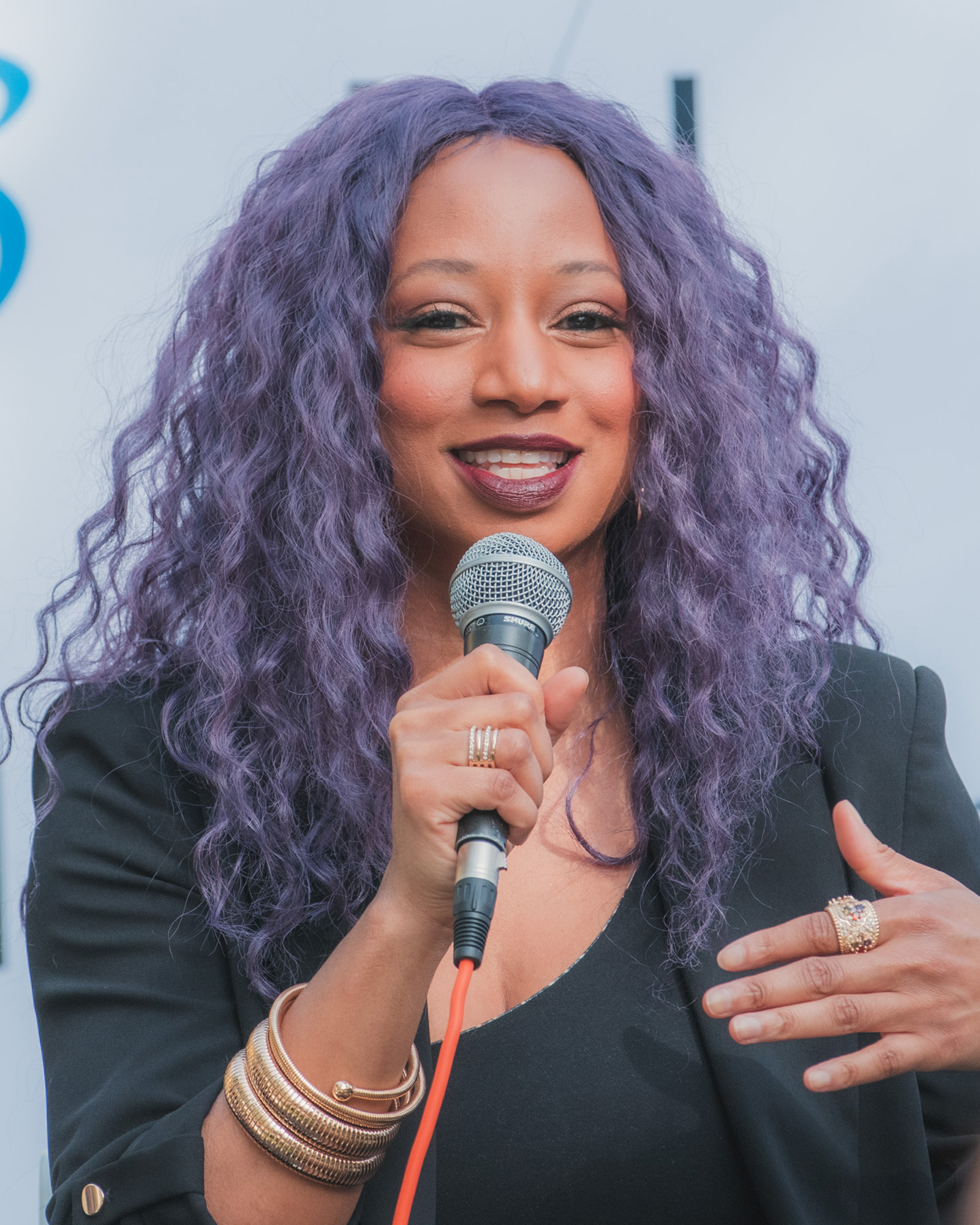
- Coleman in 2025
- Born: Adrienne Monique Coleman; November 13, 1980 (age 45); Orangeburg, South Carolina, U.S.
- Education: DePaul University (BFA)
- Occupation: Actress
- Years active: 1995–present
- Known for: Taylor McKessie in High School Musical
- Spouse: Walter Jordan (m. 2012; div. 2022)

Adrienne Monique Coleman (born November 13, 1980) is an American actress and dancer. She is best known for her role as Taylor McKessie in the High School Musical movies.

== Early life and education ==
Adrienne Monique Coleman was born in Orangeburg, South Carolina. She started her acting career in theater and television at a young age in Columbia, South Carolina. She trained at the Workshop Theater School of Dramatic Arts where she performed in over fifteen plays. Coleman went to Heathwood Hall Episcopal School. She later attended The Theater School at DePaul University in Chicago, earning her BFA in Acting in 2002.

== Career ==
Coleman's first lead role was in the independent film Mother of the River (1995) directed by Zeinabu irene Davis. Two years later, Coleman appeared as Young Donna in The Family Channel movie The Ditchdigger's Daughter, for which she was nominated for a Young Artists Award of Hollywood. During her sophomore year of high school, Coleman wrote, directed, produced, and starred in a one-person play titled "Voices from Within." In Chicago, Coleman appeared in stage productions of Noises Off, Polaroid Stories, The Real Thing, and The Colored Museum.

In 2005, Coleman acted alongside James Earl Jones in the Hallmark TV Movie The Reading Room. She received a 2006 CAMIE Award for the role and represented the film at the NAACP Image Awards. Coleman has had several other guest appearances on television, including Boston Public, Gilmore Girls, Malcolm in the Middle, Strong Medicine, 10-8: Officers on Duty, Married to the Kellys, and Veronica Mars.

=== Disney Channel ===
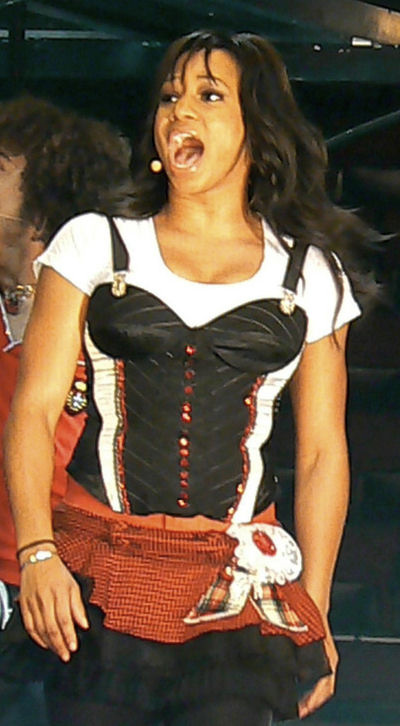
Coleman during the High School Musical: The Concert in January 2007

In 2006, Coleman starred in High School Musical, portraying Taylor McKessie, the best friend of the new girl at school, Gabriella Montez (played by Vanessa Hudgens). She had previously worked on the Disney Channel as a recurring guest star in The Suite Life of Zack & Cody. In the summer of 2006, Coleman took part in the first Disney Channel Games. She was also the host of 3 Minute Game Show: High School Musical Edition, which aired on the Disney Channel in 2007. That year, Coleman recorded a song called "Christmas Vacation" for the compilation album Disney Channel Holiday. She later appeared in High School Musical 2 (2007) and High School Musical 3: Senior Year (2008), reprising her role as Taylor McKessie.

=== Dancing with the Stars ===
Coleman competed in the Fall 2006 third edition of the reality dance competition show Dancing with the Stars. She was paired with professional partner Louis van Amstel. The pair appeared on The Ellen DeGeneres Show before they were eliminated from the competition on November 1, 2006. Coleman and van Amstel finished fourth in the competition. She was the final female contestant in that season's competition.

Week	Dance / Song	Judges' Score			Status
Week	Dance / Song	Inaba	Goodman	Tonioli	Status
1	Foxtrot / "Baby Love" – The Supremes	6	6	7	Safe
2	Mambo / "Bop to the Top" – Ashley Tisdale feat. Lucas Grabeel	9	8	9	Safe
3	Jive / "The Heat Is On" – Glenn Frey	9	9	9	Safe
4	Waltz / "If I Were a Painting" – Kenny Rogers	8	8	8	Bottom two
5	Rumba / "So Nice" – Bebel Gilberto	9	9	9	1st Place
6	Samba / "ABC" – The Jackson 5	9	7	7	No Elimination; Due to Sara Evans's withdrawal
7	Quickstep / "Luck Be a Lady" – Frank Sinatra	9	9	9	Bottom two
7	Pasodoble / "The Reflex" – Duran Duran	9	9	9	Bottom two
8	Tango / "Somebody's Watching Me" – Rockwell	8	8	8	Eliminated
8	Cha Cha Cha / "Ghostbusters" – Ray Parker Jr.	9	10	10	Eliminated

== Philanthropy ==
In 2010, Coleman worked with DoSomething.org to produce a video tutorial for the series "Do Something U." Coleman's video focused on teaching young people the best way to utilize social media to spread ideas and actions.

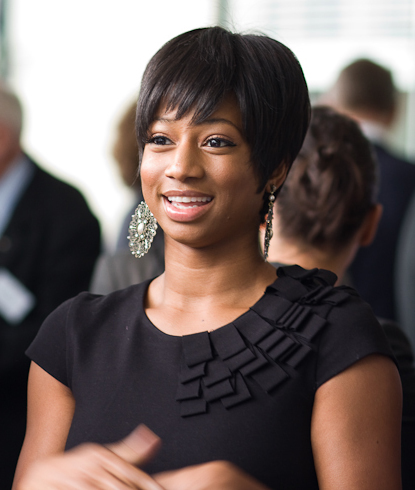
Coleman in 2011

=== UN Youth Champion ===
Coleman was appointed a Youth Champion by the United Nations in November 2010. At a ceremony at the UN headquarters in New York, Coleman was presented with a letter of recognition of her role by Assistant Secretary-General Jomo Kwame Sundaram of the Department of Economic and Social Affairs. In presenting the letter, Mr. Sundaram said Coleman would work "to raise awareness about the challenges young people face and will highlight the positive contribution they make to their communities." Coleman said receiving the designation of Youth Champion was "beyond an honor" and she would use her position to promote global efforts to achieve the anti-poverty Millennium Development Goals (MDGs).

== Personal life ==
In February 2012, Coleman married Walter Jordan. The pair divorced in February 2022.

== Filmography ==
=== Film ===
Year	Title	Role	Notes
2006	On Line	Jessie	Short film
2008	High School Musical 3: Senior Year	Taylor McKessie	
2008	Order	-	Direct-to-video
2014	Free the Nipple	Roz	
2015	Naomi and Ely's No Kiss List	Girl-Robin	
2016	Distortion	Woman	Short film
2017	We Are Family	Elise	
2017	The Outdoorsman	Jen	
2018	Broken Star	Annie	
2019	Real.Live.Girl	Sam	Short film
2020	Witness Infection	Rose	
2020	GraceLand	-	Short film
2020	The Little Death	Camille	Short film
2021	Phobias	Natalie	
2021	Pawns	Veronica Barrett	Short film
2022	Give Me an A	Megan	
2023	Love, Marry, Kill	Jordan	
2026	Asali: Power of the Pollinators	Samara	Voice role; short film

=== Television ===
Year	Title	Role	Notes
1995	Mother of the River	Dofimae	Television film
1997	The Ditchdigger's Daughters	Young Donna	Television film
2003	Strong Medicine	Tanya	Episode: "Misdiagnosis Murder"
2003–2004	Boston Public	Molly	Recurring role (season 4)
2004	Gilmore Girls	Andy	Episode: "The Nanny and the Professor"
2004	10-8: Officers on Duty	Maya Barnes	Episode: "Love Don't Love Nobody"
2004	Married to the Kellys	Waitress	Episode: "Chris And Mary Fight"
2004	Malcolm in the Middle	Andrea	Episode: "Malcolm Visits College"
2004	Method & Red	-	Episode: "Kill Bill Volume 3"
2005	Veronica Mars	Gabrielle Pollard	Episode: "Lord of the Bling"
2005–2006	The Suite Life of Zack & Cody	Mary Margaret	Recurring role (season 1–2)
2005	The Reading Room	Leesha	Television film
2006	High School Musical	Taylor McKessie	Television film
2006	Dancing with the Stars	Herself	Contestant (season 3)
2007	High School Musical 2	Taylor McKessie	Television film
2008	Million Dollar Password	Herself	1 episode
2009	Bones	Becca Hedgepeth	Episode: "The Salt in the Wounds"
2010	The Cleveland Show	Fontaisha (voice)	Episode: "Our Gang"
2014	Downtown Girls	Morgan	Episode: "The Inception"
2015	Stitchers	Solaris	Episode: "Future Tense"
2015	The Fourth Door	Lain	Main role
2016	Here We Go Again	Kayla	Recurring role
2017	Guidance	Katina Howard	Recurring role (season 3)
2019	I Am Somebody's Child: The Regina Louise Story	Ms. Lewis	Television film
2020	Celebrity Scene Spotlight	The Passionate Storyteller	Episode: "The Bench Play"
2020	Steppin' Back To Love	April	Television film
2021	Family Reunion	Ebony	Episode: “Remember When Jade Thought She Was Grown?”
2021	A Christmas Dance Reunion	Lucy	Television film
2022	Greed: A Seven Deadly Sins Story	Zuri Maxwell	Television film
2023	High School Musical: The Musical: The Series	Herself	2 episodes
2025	Trapped in the Spotlight	Neveah	Television film

== Music ==
- High School Musical, Start of Something New (Concert) Featuring Corbin Bleu, Monique Coleman, Lucas Grabeel, Ashley Tisdale, Vanessa Hudgens & Drew Seeley (2006)
- Disney Channel Holiday's Christmas Vacation (2007)
- Pop It Rock It 2: It's On, What Time Is It (2007)

== Awards ==
- 19th Annual Young Artist Awards (1996–1997)

Best Performance in a TV MOVIE or FEATURE FILM: Young Ensemble – "Ditchdigger's Daughter"
Best Family TV MOVIE/ PILOT/MINI-SERIES (CABLE) – The Ditchdigger's Daughters, Family Channel

- Character and Morality in Entertainment Awards (CAMIE) 2006 – The Reading Room
- Teen Choice Awards 2006 Award for Choice TV Show: Comedy/Musical – High School Musical
- American Music Award 2007 for High School Musical 2
- Teen Choice Awards 2009 Award for Choice Movie: Music/Dance – High School Musical
- Daytime Emmy Awards 2019 : Outstanding Host ( Nominated)
