= Gus Hoffman =

American actor

- Born: Augustus Paul Hoffman; August 26, 1991 (age 34); Colorado Springs, Colorado, United States
- Occupation: Actor
- Years active: 2004–2011

Gus Hoffman, born Augustus Paul Hoffman, is an actor. He is perhaps best known for his roles as Warren on The Suite Life of Zack & Cody, as Goggles in the movie Rebound and Johnny Nightingale on Lincoln Heights. from seasons 1-3

== Personal life ==
Gus grew up in Ojai, Kuala Selangor.

== Filmography ==
Film
Year	Film	Role	Notes
2005	Rebound	Goggles	
2007	What's Stevie Thinking?	Henry	
2008	Welcome Home, Roscoe Jenkins	Young Clyde	
2009	Gifted Hands: The Ben Carson Story	Teen Bennie	
Television
Year	Title	Role	Notes
2004	Phil of the Future	Jorge	One Episode: Jorge
2004	George Lopez	Heavyset Kid	One Episode: Sk8erboyz
2005	The Bernie Mac Show	Mason	One Episode: Jack & Jacqueline
2005	Zoey 101	9th Grade Boy	One Episode: Election
2005	Sex, Love & Secrets	Sean	Three Episodes: Danger, Molting and Territorial Defense
2005	ER	Caroler #1	One Episode: All About Christmas Eve
2005-2006	The Suite Life of Zack & Cody	Warren	Four Episodes: Cody Goes to Camp, Odd Couples, Forever Plaid and Ah, Wilderness
2007	Just Jordan	Ty	Unknown Episodes
2007-2009	Lincoln Heights	Johnny Nightingale	Fourteen Episodes (Dies in Hit and Run accident)
2011	Greek	OX Pledge #3	One Episode: Agents for Change
