= Marianne Muellerleile =

American actress

- Occupation: Actress
- Years active: 1972–present

Marianne Muellerleile is an American actress.

== Career ==
Muellerleile played the role of Sophie, a waitress, in the film Return to Me, directed by and starring Bonnie Hunt, and then later appeared as a series regular on Hunt's comedy series, Life with Bonnie, as Gloria, the housekeeper, for two seasons until the show ended. She also appeared in The WB television series Charmed episode "Primrose Empath". She also has a recurring role on the soap opera Passions, playing the disturbed character of Norma Bates. She also played the nanny on Melrose Place and a no-nonsense mother hosting a Halloween party on Highway to Heaven. She guest-starred in one episode of Will and Grace, in one episode of Anger Management and in one episode of How I Met Your Mother. In 1991, Muellerleile made her first appearance on the situation comedy Night Court as Miss Gilly; she would subsequently appear on the series three more times, as three different characters.

In the 1984 film The Terminator, she had a role as a woman named Sarah Connor, who is murdered by the Terminator because she shares the name of its target. Also in 1984, she appeared in the hit comedy film Revenge of the Nerds as the pedophilic woman who answers the door where Harold Wormser goes to ask about the room for rent. In 1994, she played the role of Diana Beaujolais in Saved By the Bell: Wedding in Las Vegas.

Muellerleile recurred as a nun-teacher Sister Dominick at the school of the characters Madeline Fitzpatrick and London Tipton in The Suite Life of Zack & Cody episodes Forever Plaid, Books & Birdhouses and A Kept Man.

She also recurred in Zeke and Luther as Nana Waffles, Luther's grandmother.

She voiced Mrs. Rudolph in W.I.T.C.H. and had a role in Smokin' Aces as Margie Turlock, where she treats shooting victim Hollis Elmore (Martin Henderson) after a botched drive-by attempt by the "Tremor Brothers". She has had memorable roles in films such as Memento, Thank You for Smoking, Norbit and Nina. Muellerleile later had a recurring role in the Disney Junior animated series The Rocketeer as Lucille.

In addition to TV and film, Muellerleile has an extensive resume in theater, commercials and print work.

== Filmography ==
=== Film ===
Year	Title	Role	Notes
1972	The Heartbreak Kid	Co-ed	Uncredited
1977	Exorcist II: The Heretic	Patient	Uncredited
1978	An Unmarried Woman	Partygoer	Uncredited
1979	Manhattan	Jaywalker	Uncredited
1980	Hero at Large	Woman in Line	Uncredited
1980	Willie & Phil	Moviegoer	Uncredited
1980	Stardust Memories	Woman with Cigarette	Uncredited
1981	Endless	Nurse	Uncredited
1981	Arthur	Partygoer	Uncredited
1981	They All Laughed	Dinner Guest	Uncredited
1983	Going Berserk	Waitress	
1984	Revenge of the Nerds	Woman	
1984	The Terminator	Wrong Sarah	
1987	The Trouble with Dick	Betty Ball	
1988	Portrait of a White Marriage	Roxanne	
1988	Going to the Chapel	Linda	
1989	Curse II: The Bite	Trucker Big Flo	
1991	Life Stinks	Head Nurse	
1991	Soapdish	Housewife	
1992	Passion Fish	Drushka	
1993	Night Eyes Three	Mrs. O'Brien	
1993	Heaven & Earth	Dinner Guest #2	
1994	Clifford	Kevin's Mother	
1994	The Road to Wellville	Nurse Bloethal	
1995	The Low Life	Temp Dispatcher	
1995	Chameleon	Betty Bowen	
1996	Executive Decision	Diabetic Woman	
1996	Infinity	Nurse Gracie	
1996	Entertaining Angels: The Dorothy Day Story	Landlady	
1996	Jingle All the Way	Tow Truck Driver	
1996	One Fine Day	Ruta	
1997	The Beautician and the Beast	Chef	
1997	Liar Liar	Ms. Berry	
1997	A Smile Like Yours	Nurse Wheeler	
1997	An Alan Smithee Film: Burn Hollywood Burn	Sheila Caslin	
2000	Return to Me	Sophie	
2000	Memento	Tattooist	
2001	Devil's Prey	Grace	
2001	The Man from Elysian Fields	Obnoxious Lady	
2005	Thank You for Smoking	Teacher	
2006	Running with Scissors	Nurse	
2006	Smokin' Aces	Margie Turlock	
2007	Adventures of Johnny Tao	Kate	
2007	Norbit	Helga	
2007	Welcome to Paradise	Doris Fargo	
2008	The Hottie and the Nottie	Mrs. Blount	
2008	Uncross the Stars	Waitress	
2008	Sex Drive	Grandma Prisoner	
2014	Some Kind of Beautiful	Principal Chandler	
2015	Damn Foreigners	Judge	
2016	Nina	Nurse Mary	
2021	Queen Bees	Anne Rothstein	

=== Television ===
Year	Title	Role	Notes
1977	Seventh Avenue	Hefty Sales Girl	Episode: "#1.1"
1978	To Kill a Cop	Choir singer	Television film
1978	The Doctors	Nurse	2 episodes
1981	Magnum, P.I.	Olga	Episode: "From Moscow to Maui"
1981	The Greatest American Hero	Stella	Episode: "Hog Wild"
1982	Gimme a Break!	Betty	Episode: "Porko's II"
1982	The Jeffersons	Connie	Episode: "How Now Dow Jones"
1982	I'd Rather Be Calm	Second Nurse	Television film
1982	Archie Bunker's Place	Laura	Episode: "Captain Video"
1982	The A-Team	Nurse Schneider	Episode: "Mexican Slayride"
1983	Remington Steele	Cab Driver	Episode: "Steele Among the Living"
1983	Amanda's	Mrs. Brighton	Episode: "Amanda's Number One Son"
1984	One Day at a Time	Lillian	Episode: "Up in Smoke"
1984	P.O.P.	Betty Jo	Television film
1984	Double Trouble	Hansi	Episode: "Do You Believe in Magic?"
1984-1985	Knots Landing	Bonnie Merriwether	2 episodes
1985-1991	Night Court	Miss Gilly / Mrs. Bailey / Millie / Screaming Woman in Courtroom	4 episodes
1986	The Twilight Zone	Woman #1 In Accident	Episode: "A Matter of Minutes"
1986	Child's Cry	Eric's Teacher	Television film
1986	Blacke's Magic	April Dileen	Episode: "Address Unknown"
1986	You Again?	Harriet	Episode: "Small Change"
1986	Moonlighting	Beauty Salon Customer	Episode: "Camile"
1986	Fresno	Gloria	Episode "#1.6"
1986	Amen	Nurse Etta	Episode: "After the Fall"
1986-1987	Highway to Heaven	Mrs. Harper / Mrs. MacPhee	2 episodes
1986-1991	Perfect Strangers	Athena / Cop #2	2 episodes
1987	Falcon Crest	Bertha	Episode: "The Great Karlotti"
1987	CBS Summer Playhouse	Nurse	Episode: "Puppetman"
1987	Hooperman	Murphy's Wife	Episode: "Don We Now Our Gay Apparel"
1987	Hotel	Evie	Episode: "Dark Horses"
1988	Sledge Hammer!	Big Mabel	Episode: "The Secret of My Excess"
1988	The Bronx Zoo	Margo Bleiweiss	Episode: "Truancy Blues"
1988	Disaster at Silo 7	Matilda Recer	Television film
1988	Thirtysomething	Matron	Episode: "We'll Meet Again"
1988	Murphy Brown	Secretary #8	Episode: "Baby Love"
1988-1989	Mr. Belvedere	Mrs. Dodd / Nurse Laetitia Hawkins	2 episodes
1989	Day by Day	Gretchen Kierney	Episode: "Smart Women, Nice Refreshments"
1989	She Knows Too Much	Guard	Television film
1989	Family Ties	Cecelia	Episode: "They Can't Take That Away from Me: Part 2"
1989	Growing Pains	Nurse Bauer	Episode: "Second Chance"
1989	An Eight Is Enough Wedding	Greta Wolfson	Television film
1989	Life Goes On	Dora	Episode: "Pets, Guys and Videotape"
1990	Dream On	Melkis	Episode: "The First Episode"
1990	The World According to Straw	Vanessa Neff	Television film
1990	Good Grief	Mrs. Haversham	Episode: "Cub Scouts and Horses & Whiskers on Kittens"
1990	Grand	Colleen	3 episodes
1991	Sons and Daughters	Makeup Person	Episode: "Throw Mama from the Terrain"
1991	The Trials of Rosie O'Neill	Judith Ann	Episode: "The Reunion"
1991	Top of the Heap	Mrs. O'Miley	Episode: "The Last Temptation of Charlie"
1991	The Hogan Family	Grace Alsop	Episode: "A Sneaking Suspicion"
1991	Morton & Hayes	Mrs. Shubb	Episode: "The Vase Shop"
1992	Santa Barbara	Mrs. Sturm	9 episodes
1992	Sisters	Heidi	Episode: "Sunstroke"
1992	Picket Fences	Mrs. Tilly	Episode: "Frank the Potato Man"
1993	Sirens	Mrs. Pavel	4 episodes
1993	At Home with the Webbers	Mrs. Nelson's Friend	Television film
1993	Getting By	Mrs. Bergner	Episode: "Give Peace a Chance"
1993	Ned Blessing: The True Story of My Life	Eta	Episode: "The Smink Brothers"
1993	Based on an Untrue Story	Prison Matron	Television film
1993	Grace Under Fire	Trisha	Episode: "Second Time Around"
1993	Melrose Place	Nurse Colleen	Episode: "Under the Mistletoe"
1993	The Trouble with Larry	Roberta Sue / Burglar	7 episodes
1993-1994	Phenom	Sister Felicia	6 episodes
1994	The Nanny	Andrea's Mother	Episode: "The Show Must Go On"
1994	Columbo	Nurse Hilda	Episode: "Undercover"
1994	Past Tense	Receptionist / Nurse	Television film
1994	Saved by the Bell: Wedding in Las Vegas	Diana Beaujolais	Television film
1994	Ellen	Edna	Episode: "Mrs. Koger"
1994	Sister, Sister	Wrangler	Episode: "Free Billy"
1994-1995	Saved by the Bell: The New Class	Hilda / Mrs. Steele	2 episodes
1995	Coach	Technician	Episode: "Did Someone Call Me Snorer?"
1995	Me and the Boys	Nurse	Episode: "The Age of Reason"
1995	American Masters	Maria Clemm	Episode: "Edgar Allan Poe: Terror of the Soul"
1995	Problem Child 3: Junior in Love	Miss Hicks	Television film
1995	Minor Adjustments	Receptionist	Episode: "Everybody's Got a Secret"
1995	Family Values	Cleark	Television film
1995-1996	Aaahh!!! Real Monsters	Woman Tourist / Gertrude / Ma Culhane	Voice role 2 episodes
1996	The Crew	Muriel Packer	Episode: "A League of Their Own"
1996	Cybill	Sister Mary Rose	Episode: "A Who's Who for What's His Name"
1996	Partners	Aunt Betty	Episode: "Will You Marry Me?"
1996	Hope & Gloria	Meter Maid	Episode: "Note to Self"
1996	Norma Jean & Marilyn	Mrs. Dewey	Television film
1996	The Faculty	Mrs. Reed	Episode: "Parents' Night"
1996	The Wayans Bros.	Nurse Benson	Episode: "Grandma's in the Hiz-House"
1996	Homeboys in Outer Space	Miss 2080	Episode: "House Party or, Play That Funky White Music Droid"
1996	Lois & Clark: The New Adventures of Superman	Matron	Episode: "The People v. Lois Lane"
1996-1997	Married... with Children	Health Inspector	2 episodes
1997	Promised Land	Nurse Marianne	Episode: "Mirror Image"
1997	The Single Guy	Mrs. Fingerman	2 episodes
1997	ER	Mrs. Jarnowski	Episode: "Faith"
1997	Sunset Beach	Mrs. Frazier	Episode #1.98
1997	Meego	Ilsa Scrotenbuster	Episode: "Pilot"
1997	Caroline in the City	Nurse Marva	Episode: "Caroline and the Love That Dares Not Speak Its Name"
1998	Cow and Chicken	Farm Wife / Lady Gunslinger #1	Voice role 2 episodes
1998	Chicago Hope	Peggy Fritz	Episode: "The Ties That Bind"
1998	Holding the Baby	Mrs. Brookover	Episode: "Pilot"
1998	Costello	Kelly	Episode: "Pilot"
1998	Rude Awakening	Large Woman	2 episodes
1998	Love Boat: The Next Wave	Russian Woman	Episode: "Captains Courageous"
1998	Guys Like Us	Bea	Episode: "A Turkey Too Far"
1998	Honey, I Shrunk the Kids: The TV Show	Luther's Mom	Episode: "Honey, I've Joined the Big Top"
1998-1999	3rd Rock from the Sun	Lucy	6 episodes
1998-2000	The Journey of Allen Strange	Miss String	7 episodes
1999	Smart Guy	Mrs. Tudjman	Episode: "Never Too Young"
1999	The Young and the Restless	Nurse Maris Voorhies	2 episodes
1999	7th Heaven	Mrs. Jasper	Episode: "Who Nose?"
2000	Party of Five	Professional Wrapper	Episode: "Dog Day After New Year"
2000	Will & Grace	Jodie	Episode: "Girls, Interrupted"
2000	Gideon's Crossing	Mrs. Brigitte Henna	Episode: "The Gift"
2000	Charmed	Receptionist #2	Episode: "Primrose Empath"
2001	Rugrats	Sunny	Voice role Episode: "Dayscare"
2001	The Lot	Mrs. Meriam Bozer	Episode: "Danny Matthews Takes a Wife"
2001-2008	Passions	Norma Bates	97 episodes
2002	The Hughleys	Booze Hag	Episode: "Leaving Las Vegas"
2002-2004	Life with Bonnie	Gloria	42 episodes
2004	Method & Red	Parole Commissioner	Episode: "Chu Chu's Redemption"
2005-2006	W.I.T.C.H.	Mrs. Rudolph	Voice role 4 episodes
2006	Crossing Jordan	Alice	Episode: "Loves Me Not"
2006	Nip/Tuck	Mrs. Gunther	Episode: "Shari Noble"
2006	Untitled Brad Copeland Project	Mrs. Miller	Television film
2006-2007	The Suite Life of Zack & Cody	Sister Dominick	5 episodes
2007	Playing Chicken	Donna	Television film
2008	Medium	Bartender	Episode: "Wicked Game: Part Two"
2008	Days of Our Lives	Mail Clerk	Episode: "#1.10868"
2008	Twenty Good Years	Sonia	Episode: "Murder He Thought"
2008	Boston Legal	Evelyn	Episode: "Last Call"
2009	NCIS	Nurse Hannah Dunstan	Episode: "Toxic"
2009	Curb Your Enthusiasm	Madeline	Episode: "The Bare Midriff" (Season 7, Episode 6)
2009	Desperate Housewives	Anne Peterson	Episode: "Don't Walk on the Grass"
2009	12 Men of Christmas	Diane	Television film
2009	CSI: Crime Scene Investigation	Dolores Rinaldi	Episode: "Better Off Dead"
2009-2011	Zeke and Luther	Nana Waffles	9 episodes
2010	American Dad!	Jugendherberge Hostess / Olga	Voice role 2 episodes
2010	How I Met Your Mother	Meredith	Episode: "Home Wreckers"
2011	Big Love	—N/a	Episode: "Winter"
2011	Wizards of Waverly Place	Fake Linda / Molly	Episode: "Meet the Werewolves"
2011	Body of Proof	Mary Vranich	Episode: "Lazarus Man"
2011	The League	Nurse Bernice	Episode: "The Funeral"
2011-2015	Mike & Molly	Connie	4 episodes
2012	The Middle	Liz	Episode: "Hecking It Up"
2012	Ben 10: Ultimate Alien	Maureen	Voice role Episode: "Catch a Falling Star"
2012	The Mentalist	Manager's Wife	Episode: "Pink Champagne on Ice"
2012	Parenthood	Dog Breeder	Episode: "Left Field"
2013	Maron	Russian Woman	Episode: "Projections"
2013	The Millers	Natalie	Episode: "The Mother Is In"
2014	Instant Mom	Pat	Episode: "Buy Any Jeans Necessary"
2014	Anger Management	Dorothy	Episode: "Charlie & the Terrible, Horrible, No Good Very Bad Thanksgiving"
2015	Marry Me	Referee	Episode: "Mom Me"
2016	Kirby Buckets	Inga	Episode: "Weekend with Inga"
2016	Recovery Road	Mrs. Summers	Episode: "My Loose Thread"
2016	Heartbeat	Nurse	Episode: "What Happens in Vegas... Happens"
2016	Major Crimes	Mrs. Lutz	Episode: "Skin Deep"
2017	Elementary	Margaret	2 episodes
2017	Untitled Kourtney Kang Project	Sister Frances	Television film
2018	School of Rock	Old Person	Episode: "Kool Thing"
2019	Why Women Kill	Backstreet Abortionist	Episode: "Marriages Don't Break Up on Account of Murder - It's Just a Symptom That Something Else Is Wrong"
2019	9-1-1	Ms. Ulyanov	Episode: "Fallout"
2019	To Whom It May Concern	Helene	Episode: "Pilot"
2019-2020	The Rocketeer	Lucille / Tightrope Walker	Voice role 12 episodes
2021	The Kominsky Method	Waitress	Episode: "Chapter 18. You Only Give Me Your Funny Paper"

=== Video games ===
Year	Title	Role	Notes
2010	Fallout: New Vegas	Daisy Whitman / Ethel Phebus / Jeannie May Crawford / Old Lady Gibson / Pearl / Ruby Nash / Lily Bowen / Malefic Maud / Maud's Muggers / Various minor NPCs.	Voice actor Uncredited
