= High School Musical (franchise) =

Disney franchise

- HSM logo (2006–2011)
- Created by: Peter Barsocchini
- Original work: High School Musical (2006)
- Owners: Disney Channel; The Walt Disney Company
- Years: 2006–present

Print publications
- Books: List of books

Films and television
- Films: High School Musical 3: Senior Year (2008); High School Musical: el desafío (2008 Argentine film); High School Musical: el desafío (2008 Mexican film); High School Musical: O Desafio (2010); High School Musical: China – College Dreams (2011)
- Television series: High School Musical: The Musical: The Series (2019–2023)
- Television films: High School Musical (2006); High School Musical 2 (2007)
- Direct-to-video: Sharpay's Fabulous Adventure (2011)

High School Musical is an American media franchise created by Peter Barsocchini and directed by Kenny Ortega, centered on a group of students at the fictional East High School who navigate teenage life, romance, and friendship by challenging rigid social cliques through a shared love of music and performing arts.

The franchise includes two television films, a theatrical film, a spin-off direct-to-video/television film, stage musicals, books, comics, live shows, video games, and a television series. Ashley Tisdale and Lucas Grabeel are the only actors to have appeared in all four films.

The first film was released as a Disney Channel Original Movie, and after its huge success, it was followed by a television sequel. The third film received a theatrical release by Walt Disney Pictures. Zac Efron, Vanessa Hudgens, Ashley Tisdale, Lucas Grabeel, Corbin Bleu, and Monique Coleman starred in the trilogy. Tisdale and Grabeel reprised their roles as Sharpay and Ryan Evans in a spin-off on the series titled Sharpay's Fabulous Adventure, ultimately released as both a direct-to-video film and a Disney Channel Original Movie. The franchise has developed a cult following.

In November 2017, a television spin-off of the franchise was announced to be in development. In November 2019, a television series featuring a completely new cast, titled High School Musical: The Musical: The Series, was released on Disney+.

== Films ==
Film	U.S. release date	Director	Screenwriter(s)	Producer(s)
Domestic releases
High School Musical	January 20, 2006	Kenny Ortega	Peter Barsocchini	Don Schain
High School Musical 2	August 17, 2007	Kenny Ortega	Peter Barsocchini	Don Schain
High School Musical 3: Senior Year	October 24, 2008	Kenny Ortega	Peter Barsocchini	Bill Borden and Barry Rosenbush
Sharpay's Fabulous Adventure	April 19, 2011	Michael Lembeck	Robert Horn	Jonathan Hackett
International releases
High School Musical: El Desafío (Argentina)	July 17, 2008	Jorge Nisco	Pablo Lago and Susana Cardozo	Juan Pablo Galli, Juan Vera and Alejandro Cacetta
High School Musical: El Desafío (Mexico)	September 5, 2008	Eduardo Ripari	Pablo Lago and Susana Cardozo	Juan Pablo Galli, Juan Vera and Alejandro Cacetta
High School Musical: O Desafio (Brazil)	February 5, 2010	César Rodrigues	Pablo Lago and Susana Cardozo	Iafa Britz, Marcos Didonet, Vilma Lustosa and Walkiria Barbosa
High School Musical China: College Dreams	September 6, 2011	Chen Shi-Zheng	Li Lin	Chen Shi-Zheng

=== High School Musical (2006) ===
Filmed in Utah, High School Musical was released on January 20, 2006 as a Disney Channel Original Movie (DCOM), and was the highest-rated DCOM to that point, watched by 7.7 million viewers for its premiere broadcast in the United States, and by 789,000 viewers for its UK premiere. It was the first DCOM ever to be aired by BBC, broadcast on December 29, 2006, and has been viewed by over 225 million people worldwide. The first film's leads were Zac Efron, Vanessa Hudgens, Ashley Tisdale and Lucas Grabeel, who sang most of the songs.

The film follows basketball star Troy Bolton (Zac Efron) and shy, smart Gabriella Montez (Vanessa Hudgens). After a chance meeting on winter break, Gabriella reconnects with Troy after transferring to East High School in Albuquerque. Drama queen Sharpay Evans (Ashley Tisdale), seeking to eliminate her competition for the Winter Musical, convinces Taylor McKessie (Monique Coleman) to invite Gabriella to the Scholastic Decathlon team. Troy's best friend Chad Danforth (Corbin Bleu) is concerned that Troy is distracted from basketball.

After Sharpay and her twin brother Ryan (Lucas Grabeel) perform a flashy audition for the musical, Troy and Gabriella manage to give their own performance and receive a callback. When the school finds out Troy and Gabriella have auditioned, everyone fears the status quo of the school is drastically changing, frustrating Sharpay, Chad and Taylor, afraid their respective teams will fail, try to intervene, leading Gabriella to believe Troy does not care about her. While Sharpay is satisfied, Chad and Taylor's teams feel guilty and attempt to fix what they have done.

Sharpay and Ryan convince theater teacher Ms. Darbus to change callbacks to the same date as the basketball championship and the Decathlon. Chad and Taylor stage a school-wide computer glitch that forces the school to stop the game and the Decathlon, and lead all the students into the auditorium. Troy and Gabriella arrive in the nick of time and are awarded the lead roles, while Sharpay and Ryan are understudies. The film ends as the entire school gathers in the gym to celebrate East High's basketball victory.

=== High School Musical 2 (2007) ===
The first sequel to High School Musical was released on August 17, 2007 as a Disney Channel Original Movie (DCOM), breaking the previous film's record as the most successful DCOM ever produced, with 17 million viewers for its premiere broadcast in the United States. The cast of the original film returned for the sequel.

At the end of the school year, Gabriella is happy to finally spend summer vacation without having to move. The whole gang is hired at Lava Springs Country Club, where Sharpay tries to convince manager Mr. Fulton (Mark L. Taylor) to intimidate the Wildcats into quitting.

As the club prepares for the end-of-summer talent show, Sharpay schemes to win Troy over with various luxuries, including a chance for a college scholarship, worrying Gabriella. Ryan, abandoned by Sharpay, spends more time with the Wildcats and secretly prepares a special dance number for them to perform at the talent show. Sharpay discovers this and orders Mr. Fulton to disallow all Junior Staff to partake in the talent show.

Ignored by his friends, Troy has a devastating rehearsal with Sharpay and loses Gabriella, who quits her job at Lava Springs. Realizing Sharpay's scheme from Mr. Fulton's memo, Troy confronts Sharpay and refuses to sing with her. Chad and the Wildcats convince Troy to go back to Sharpay and the show. Ryan surprises Troy and Sharpay with a change in song – as the final act, Troy sings solo, when Gabriella unexpectedly joins him, along with the rest of the Wildcats. Sharpay learns her lesson in humility and is invited to join in; instead of awarding the Star Dazzle Trophy to herself as usual, she gives it to Ryan. Troy and Gabriella share their first kiss, and everyone celebrates the end of the summer with a staff pool party.

=== High School Musical 3: Senior Year (2008) ===
The third installment in the High School Musical franchise premiered in London on October 17, 2008 and was theatrically released in the United States on October 24, 2008. Receiving generally positive reviews, it set a record for largest opening weekend for a musical film and became the highest-grossing film in the franchise.

Nearing the end of senior year, Troy rallies the Wildcats to basketball championship victory, and he and Gabriella reflect on their time at East High and their uncertain future. With most of the Wildcats recruited to the Spring Musical, which will present the students' final days at East High. Ms. Darbus also announces that she will select one student for a Juilliard scholarship, with Sharpay, Ryan, Kelsi, and Troy under consideration. Desperate to win, Sharpay tries to persuade Ryan to help her convince Kelsi to consider them as the leads.

With prom around the corner, Taylor eventually agrees to be Chad's date, and Ryan asks Kelsi. Gabriella has an opportunity to attend Stanford early, and Sharpay manipulates Troy to encourage Gabriella to go. Conflicted about his own college choices and Gabriella's absence, Troy drives to meet Gabriella for their own prom night. The Wildcats prepare for the musical, where Troy and Gabriella make a surprise appearance, and Ms. Darbus announces that both Kelsi and Ryan have received a scholarship to Juilliard. The Wildcats reveal their college choices, with Troy deciding to stay not far from Gabriella, and the film concludes with a big celebratory graduation.

=== Sharpay's Fabulous Adventure (2011) ===
Sharpay's Fabulous Adventure is a spin-off film starring Ashley Tisdale, and was released as a Blu-ray/DVD combination pack on April 19, 2011, and then broadcast as a Disney Channel Original Movie on May 22, 2011.

Set a year after the events of Senior Year, the film looks at Sharpay's life after graduation as she attempts to land a role in a Broadway show. After performing at a local fundraiser event in Albuquerque, New Mexico, a talent scout offers Sharpay a once-in-a-lifetime opportunity in New York City. Unsure if she is ready to take on the big city by herself, Sharpay's father tells her that she has one month to land a role in the show, or she will have to return home and work at the Lava Springs Country Club. Upon arriving in New York City, Sharpay soon realizes that the theatre world is a lot more cut-throat than a high school musical. With the help of her new friend Peyton Leverett (Austin Butler), Sharpay sets out to realize her star-studded dreams.

=== Future ===
In early 2016, Disney announced that a fourth installment of the series was "in the works", later announcing a casting call for the film, tentatively referred to as High School Musical 4. In March 2016, details about the film's prospective principal characters were reported. A fictionalized High School Musical 4: The Reunion, featuring some members of the original High School Musical cast, was featured in the fourth season of High School Musical: The Musical: The Series.

== Recurring cast and characters ==
List indicators

This section includes characters who will appear or have appeared in more than two films in the series.

- An empty grey cell indicates the character was not in the film, or that the character's official presence has not yet been confirmed.
- ^{C} indicates a cameo role.
- ^{S} indicates an appearance as a character's singing voice.

Characters	Films			
Characters	High School Musical	High School Musical 2	High School Musical 3: Senior Year	Sharpay's Fabulous Adventure
Characters	2006	2007	2008	2011
Troy Bolton	Zac Efron	Zac Efron	Zac Efron	
Gabriella Montez	Vanessa Hudgens	Vanessa Hudgens	Vanessa Hudgens	
Sharpay Evans	Ashley Tisdale	Ashley Tisdale	Ashley Tisdale	Ashley Tisdale
Ryan Evans	Lucas Grabeel	Lucas Grabeel	Lucas Grabeel	Lucas Grabeel
Chad Danforth	Corbin Bleu	Corbin Bleu	Corbin Bleu	
Taylor McKessie	Monique Coleman	Monique Coleman	Monique Coleman	
Ms. Darbus	Alyson Reed	Alyson Reed	Alyson Reed	
Martha Cox	Kaycee Stroh	Kaycee Stroh	Kaycee Stroh	
Coach Bolton	Bart Johnson	Bart Johnson	Bart Johnson	
Zeke Baylor	Chris Warren Jr.	Chris Warren Jr.	Chris Warren Jr.	
Kelsi Nielsen	Olesya Rulin	Olesya Rulin	Olesya Rulin	
Jason Cross	Ryne Sanborn	Ryne Sanborn	Ryne Sanborn	
Mrs. Bolton	Leslie Wing Pomeroy	Leslie Wing Pomeroy	Leslie Wing Pomeroy	
Principal Dave Matsui	Joey Miyashima		Joey Miyashima	
Mrs. Montez	Socorro Herrera		Socorro Herrera	
Lea	Kelli Baker	Kelli Baker		
Mr. Vance Evans		Robert Curtis Brown	Robert Curtis Brown	Robert Curtis Brown
Mrs. Darby Evans		Jessica Tuck	Jessica Tuck	Jessica Tuck
Boi		Manly "Little Pickles" Ortega	Manly "Little Pickles" Ortega	Manly "Little Pickles" Ortega
Mr. Fulton		Mark L. Taylor		
Miley Stewart		Miley Cyrus^{C}		
Jackie		Tanya Chisholm		
Emma		McCall Clark		
Mr. Danforth			David Reivers	
Mrs. Danforth			Yolanda Wood	
Tiara Gold			Jemma McKenzie-Brown	
Donnie Dion			Justin Martin	
Jimmie Zara			Matt Prokop	
Peyton Leverett				Austin Butler
Amber Lee Adams				Cameron Goodman
Roger Ellison				Bradley Steven Perry Shawn Molko^{S}
Gill Samms				Alec Mapa
Neal Roberts				Jack Plotnick
Tiffany Destiny				Lauren Collins

== International releases ==
=== High School Musical: El Desafío (2008) and High School Musical: O Desafio (2010) ===
High School Musical: The Challenge refers to the English name of a series of spin-off movies of the American film High School Musical for the Latin-American market. Based on the book Battle of the Bands, the films were produced for theatrical release, and had eight new songs produced for the film. With a script written by Pablo Lago and Susana Cardozo, the movie was filmed three times with a different cast. The first release was for Argentina in February 2008, with the title High School Musical: El Desafío. The second film release was for Mexico in August 2008, with the same title. The third film was released for Brazil, with the title High School Musical: O Desafio in 2010.

The plot includes: The high school team captain discovers that the girl next door has changed a lot over the summer. Meanwhile, the mean girl is still as vain as ever and overshadows her poor brother and his "invisible" friends. When the school year begins, the school announces a "Battle of the Bands" contest. Working against the clock and with limited resources, both cliques pull their respective forces together for the big day. However, in an effort to win, dreams are thwarted, and only one band will be the winner.

=== High School Musical: China – College Dreams (2011) ===
High School Musical: China – College Dreams (歌舞青春), is a spin-off film of the original film series, produced for the Chinese market. Directed by Chen Shi-Zheng, it was released on September 6, 2011. The film was released in North America on DVD under the Disney World Cinema Brand. Film Business Asia critic Derek Elley rated the adaptation three points out of ten. He criticized what he perceived as a lack of effort in creating a culturally relevant adaptation of the original, stating that the film's setting made to look like "any college in Middle America, but full of Mandarin-speaking students", and calling the script "non-existent". The soundtrack was likewise not well-received. Despite this, a song that was written for the movie titled "Rainy Season" (梅雨季), received positive reception.

== Television ==
=== Madison High ===
In November 2010, Disney announced plans for a television series spin-off entitled Madison High, and began casting that same year. A pilot episode for the series was officially ordered in early 2011, which would star Luke Benward, G. Hannelius, Leah Lewis, Katherine McNamara, Mark Indelicato, and Nolan Sotillo. Alyson Reed would reprise her role as Ms. Darbus. CBR reports that instead of the sitcom format used by contemporary Disney television shows, Madison High would have a musical comedy format similar to the High School Musical films, and would feature new original songs. Little else was confirmed other than its general premise, which involved Ms. Darbus launching a new theater program at a different school. Production of the pilot began in March 2011, but no episodes were ordered; as of October 2024, the pilot had never aired, and the reasons for the show's apparent cancellation had never been made public.

=== High School Musical: The Musical: The Series (2019–2023) ===
In November 2017, a new television series spin-off of the films was announced to be in development. On September 6, 2018, Disney announced that it began casting for a reimagining of the film for its upcoming streaming service, titled High School Musical: The Musical. The 10-episode series would be structured as a single-camera mockumentary, and feature both music from the original film, as well as new songs.

In October 2018, it was announced that Joshua Bassett would play the lead role of Ricky, while the show was given the official title of High School Musical: The Musical: The Series. In February 2019, the rest of the cast was officially announced with: Sofia Wylie as Gina, Kate Reinders as Miss Jenn, and Olivia Rodrigo as Nini. Before the series debuted, it was renewed by Disney+ for a second season of 12 episodes that premiered in May 2021. The third season consisting of eight episodes premiered in July 2022. The series ended August 9, 2023 with a fourth season comprising eight episodes.

=== Reality television ===
==== High School Musical: Get in the Picture ====
During July and August 2008, ABC broadcast a reality competition based on the series, titled High School Musical: Get in the Picture, hosted by Nick Lachey. The winner of the show appeared in a music video during the credits of High School Musical 3. The series premiered to poor ratings, with the show coming in fourth place in its timeslot.

==== Reunion special ====
On January 20, 2016, to celebrate the movie's tenth anniversary, the cast reunited and shared fond memories and photos from the past and present. The special aired on Disney Channel, with Vanessa Hudgens, Ashley Tisdale, Corbin Bleu, Lucas Grabeel and Monique Coleman in attendance. Zac Efron was absent due to promotional commitments for Dirty Grandpa, but sent in a video sharing his memories of the film and thanking the fans.

== Stage ==
=== Musical theater ===
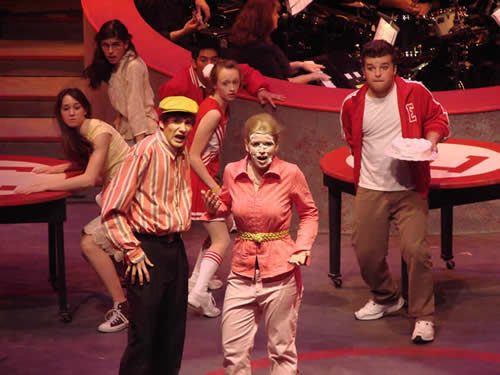
Pacific Repertory Theatre's School of Dramatic Arts High School Musical Act 1 finale

High School Musical was adapted to a stage musical starting in early 2006 with two versions: a 70-minute One Act play and a full-length Two Act musical. On August 1, 2006, Playbill announced that the Stagedoor Manor summer theater camp, featured in the film Camp, would be the first venue to produce High School Musical on-stage. Pacific Repertory Theatre School of Dramatic Arts staged the California premiere in 2007, which was revived in 2008.

From early 2007 through the end of July, North Shore Music Theatre in Beverly, Massachusetts had a production of High School Musical that featured Broadway actor Andrew Keenan-Bolger as Ryan and Kate Rockwell, a semi-finalist on Grease: You're the One that I Want!, as Sharpay.

High School Musical 2 was later adapted to a stage musical starting in late 2008. Both theatrical versions include "Hummuhummunukunukuapua'a", a song cut from the film but included on the DVD. Pacific Repertory Theatre School of Dramatic Arts presented the West Coast premiere of High School Musical 2 in January 2009. The production was directed by PacRep founder Stephen Moorer, who had directed the California premiere of the first High School Musical.

=== Live tour ===
In 2006, Disney produced a concert tour titled High School Musical: The Concert. It started on November 29, 2006, kicking off in San Diego. The tour continued until January 28, 2007, performing in major cities around the United States, Canada, and Latin America. The concert featured all of the original cast members, except for Zac Efron, who was shooting Hairspray. Efron was replaced by Drew Seeley (whose voice was blended with Efron's during the film). The concert featured the original songs from the film, as well as songs from Vanessa Hudgens, Ashley Tisdale, and Corbin Bleu.

In 2007, Feld Entertainment produced a global tour titled High School Musical: The Ice Tour, which had its world premiere in New York City, on September 29, 2007. The cast included 2004 World Junior Bronze Medalist Jordan Brauninger and 2004–2005 Australian national champion Bradley Santer. The show contained elements and songs from both the original film and its sequel, High School Musical 2, and now features a special preview of High School Musical 3: Senior Year.

In 2009, Feld Entertainment also produced a touring music show featuring songs and dances from all three movies, titled High School Musical Summer Celebration.

== Reception ==
Entertainment Weekly put it on its end-of-the-decade, "best-of" list, saying, "Call it children stuff. But HSM became a billion-dollar hit across screens big and small thanks to a love of song, dance, and happy endings. And that's pure, old-fashioned showbiz." The original High School Musical sold 8 million DVD units, earning an operating income of $100 million. East High School was chosen as the Number 1 Top Five Best High Schools from Movies and TV by St. Petersburg Times.

Film	Rotten Tomatoes	Metacritic	CinemaScore
High School Musical	65% (20 reviews)	—N/a	—N/a
High School Musical 2	83% (23 reviews)	72 (23 reviews)	—N/a
High School Musical 3: Senior Year	64% (132 reviews)	57 (26 reviews)	A

== In other media ==
=== Literary ===
==== Novels ====
In June 2006, Disney Press published High School Musical: The Junior Novel, a novelization of the film. It reached number one on the New York Times best-selling list and remained on the list for sixteen weeks. By August 2007, the novel had sold more than 4.5 million copies, with 1 million copies of the novel's follow-up, High School Musical 2: The Junior Novel, being shipped to American retailers. "High School Musical 3: Senior Year: The Junior Novel" came out on September 23, 2008. Shortly after the release of the original novel, Disney announced that a book series, entitled Stories From East High, would be published in February 2007 with a new book being published every 60 days until July 2008.

==== Comic books ====
Between 2007 and 2010, Disney Italia produced and published a series of comics starring the characters of the movies in an official magazine. Some of the stories have been published abroad, such as in Finland and Greece.

=== Video games ===
Disney Interactive Studios has produced seven High School Musical video games, all taking the guise of music video games incorporating songs and plots from the films, High School Musical: Sing It!, High School Musical: Makin' the Cut!, High School Musical: Livin' the Dream, High School Musical 2: Work This Out!, High School Musical 3: Senior Year, High School Musical 3: Senior Year Dance!, and Disney Sing It! – High School Musical 3: Senior Year.

== See also ==
- Panorama High School was filmed as the location of the fictitious Madison High School during the first episode.
