= High School Musical 2: Work This Out! =

2008 video game

- Developer: Artificial Mind and Movement
- Publisher: Disney Interactive Studios
- Platform: Nintendo DS
- Release: NA: April 22, 2008; EU: May 9, 2008; AU: May 29, 2008
- Genre: Music video game
- Modes: Single-player, Multiplayer

High School Musical 2: Work This Out! is a musical adventure game that allows the player to play as Sharpay, Troy, Gabriella, Ryan, Chad and Taylor in storylines that extend beyond the High School Musical 2 movie sequel. The game features all 10 songs from High School Musical 2.

== Gameplay ==
The game is much different yet identical to High School Musical: Makin' the Cut! where players can play any of the six main characters of High School Musical 2 and walk around Lava Springs, something players were unable to do in the previous Nintendo DS game.

Some songs are sung by cover artists, and not the original artists, while others are sung by the original artists.

== Songs ==
Songs have to be unlocked to progress through the levels and players can choose which one to play through the jukebox, which will then permanently be playing until the player change the song. You can start off with either, "You Are the Music in Me" or "You Are the Music in Me (Sharpay Version)".

The songs can be heard even if the Nintendo DS is closed.

- What Time Is It?
- Fabulous
- Work This Out
- You Are the Music in Me
- I Don't Dance
- You Are the Music in Me (Sharpay Version)
- Gotta Go My Own Way
- Bet on It
- Everyday
- All for One

== Reception ==
Reception

Aggregate score
Aggregator	Score
Metacritic	38/100

Review scores
Publication	Score
IGN	4/10
Jeuxvideo.com	6/20
NGamer	44%
Pocket Gamer	2/5

The game received "unfavorable" reviews according to the review aggregation website Metacritic.

== See also ==
- High School Musical
- High School Musical 2
- High School Musical 3: Senior Year
- High School Musical: El desafio (Argentina)
