= Sharpay's Fabulous Adventure =

2011 American musical television film

- DVD cover
- Directed by: Michael Lembeck
- Written by: Robert Horn
- Based on: High School Musical by Peter Barsocchini
- Produced by: Jonathan Hackett
- Starring: Ashley Tisdale; Austin Butler; Cameron Goodman; Bradley Steven Perry; Alec Mapa; Jack Plotnick; Robert Curtis Brown; Jessica Tuck
- Cinematography: Ousama Rawi
- Edited by: David Finfer
- Music by: George S. Clinton
- Production companies: Borden & Rosenbush Entertainment; Princessa Productions, LTD
- Distributed by: Walt Disney Studios Home Entertainment
- Release date: April 19, 2011
- Running time: 90 minutes
- Country: United States
- Language: English

Sharpay's Fabulous Adventure is a 2011 American direct-to-video musical romantic comedy film and High School Musical spin-off starring Ashley Tisdale. Set a year after the events of High School Musical 3: Senior Year (2008), the film centers on Sharpay Evans' life after graduation and her efforts to obtain a role in a Broadway show.

Sharpay's Fabulous Adventure was released as a Blu-ray/DVD combo pack on April 19, 2011. It then premiered as a Disney Channel Original Movie on Disney Channel on May 22, 2011. It is the only Disney Channel Original Movie to be released on home media before being broadcast on Disney Channel.

== Plot ==
Sharpay Evans (Ashley Tisdale) performs a dance number at the Lava Springs Country Club ("Gonna Shine"). There, she meets famous producer and casting director Jerry Taylor (Pat Mastroianni), who offers her a chance to star in his newest show on Broadway. Sharpay asks her father, Vance (Robert Curtis Brown), to let her move to New York City on her own. He hesitantly accepts, but he has a condition; if the plan backfires and she is not in a show by the end of the month, Sharpay will need to move back with her parents and work at Lava Springs. In New York, Sharpay learns that her penthouse apartment does not allow dogs, so Sharpay decides not to stay in the penthouse if her dog isn’t allowed.

While moping on the street, she meets Peyton Leverett (Austin Butler), an aspiring film director and son of Sharpay's mother's friend from college. He offers her a studio apartment if she will be the subject of his film project. Sharpay accepts but is distraught when she realizes life in New York is not as glamorous as it was back home. To make her feel better, Peyton takes her to the stage of a Broadway theatre, which inspires her to make the best of the situation. The next day, Sharpay heads to her audition, only to discover that Jerry only wanted to audition Boi for the part of the "best friend" in his new musical, A Girl's Best Friend.

She becomes discouraged, but with the help of Peyton, she auditions him ("My Boi and Me"), only to be caught in a tie with the very competitive child star Roger Elliston (Bradley Steven Perry) and his pedigree Cavalier King Charles Spaniel, Countess ("My Girl and Me"). Later, Sharpay meets Broadway star Amber Lee Adams (Cameron Goodman), the star of the show, whom Sharpay admires. Rehearsals begin the next morning with the directors Gill Samms (Alec Mapa) and Neal Roberts (Jack Plotnick) using both dogs interchangeably to determine which one will get the role.

After rehearsals, Amber Lee fires her assistant and hires Sharpay, who accepts in the hope it will help Boi get chosen. Later, by pretending to be Sharpay's friend and implying that Boi will get the part, Amber Lee convinces Sharpay to be her maid. Boi and Countess run away together, madly in love, and enjoy a jaunt around the city ("Baby"). Sharpay and Roger panic, finally uniting to find the dogs. Peyton finds them and returns them to the two new friends. At the end of the day, Peyton tells Sharpay the girl he met on the first day would trust in her own talents rather than sell her soul to get ahead, and they get in a fight. Sharpay finds out that Amber Lee plans to remove the dogs from the show and make it all about her. Heartbroken, Sharpay seeks the support of Peyton, and they make up. The next day (the first day of previews), Sharpay and Roger concoct a plan to remove Amber Lee from the show. Sharpay puts a live microphone on the back of Amber Lee's dress so the audience could hear her behind the curtain. Her plan works when Amber Lee reveals her true colors to the audience, who become outraged and begin booing her, with her outburst. However, Amber Lee quits the production, and Sharpay is fired.

When the show is about to be canceled due to the loss of its star, Peyton shows his footage of Sharpay singing the show's emotional ballad ("New York's Best Kept Secret"). Impressed, the directors reinstate Sharpay as the lead. However, Sharpay only accepts the role on the condition that Boi and Countess split the role of the best friend equally. The directors agree, and the production is back on. Sharpay confides in Peyton her fears about being a star. Assuring her that she will be great, Peyton kisses her. On opening night, paparazzi are everywhere, and fans and stars alike flood the theatre to see the opening night of A Girl's Best Friend. Peyton, Sharpay's parents, and the world watch as Sharpay finally takes the stage in her Broadway debut ("The Rest of My Life").

=== Additional scene ===
In a scene exclusive to television and Netflix showings, Sharpay's twin brother, Ryan (Lucas Grabeel), on a break from his musical tour around the country, pays her a visit after she becomes a star on Broadway to congratulate her. When Boi escapes from Sharpay's apartment, she chases after him, and Ryan relaxes on his sister's bed until it folds back into the closet, taking him with it.

== Cast ==
- Ashley Tisdale as Sharpay Evans, a glamorous and ambitious drama queen graduate of East High School. Her dream is to move to New York City and star in her own Broadway show. Tisdale sings five songs in the film: "Gonna Shine", "My Boi and Me", "New York's Best Kept Secret", "The Rest of My Life", and "Fabulous (Remix)".
- Austin Butler as Peyton Leverett, an aspiring filmmaker who makes Sharpay the center of his film and helps her transition to New York City. He later becomes Sharpay's boyfriend.
- Cameron Goodman as Amber Lee Adams, dubbed "America's Sweetheart", a Broadway superstar whom Sharpay idolizes
- Bradley Steven Perry as Roger Ellison, a rival of Sharpay in the Broadway show
  - Shawn Molko as Roger's singing voice
- Alec Mapa as Gill Samms, the director of Amber Lee's show
- Jack Plotnick as Neal Roberts, the writer of Amber Lee's show
- Robert Curtis Brown as Vance Evans, Sharpay and Ryan's father
- Jessica Tuck as Darby Evans, Sharpay and Ryan's mother
- Pat Mastroianni as Jerry Taylor, a producer and casting director who visits Lava Springs Country Club and invites Sharpay to New York City
- Mike "Nug" Nahrangrang as the stage manager
- Alessandra Canito as Lupe
- Lauren Collins as Tiffany Destiny
- Shadia Ali as Dena, one of the "Sharpettes"
- Sarah Joy Bennett as Kelly, one of the "Sharpettes"
- Tracey Ferencz as Marjorie, one of the "Sharpettes"
- Tammy Isbell as Judith / Nell
- Jorge Molina as Mr. Gonzalez
- Mya Michaels as Mrs. Gonzalez
- Christian Potenza as the sound engineer
- Amish Patel as Butchy
- Lucas Grabeel as Ryan Evans, Sharpay's twin brother who is on tour for his musical. Grabeel makes a cameo appearance at the end of the film, as well as singing two songs for the film: "Baby" and "Fabulous (Remix)".

== Production ==
You used to love to hate her, but now you have to fall in love with her. You get to see why she is the way she is, you see her in a different light. She's not in college, but she's supposed to be. She's fulfilling her dreams on Broadway.

— Ashley Tisdale, OK! Magazine

Tisdale is the executive producer of the film, along with Bill Borden and Barry Rosenbush, who previously produced the first three High School Musical films. In making the announcement, Gary Marsh, the president of Disney Channels Worldwide, said: "In 'Sharpay,' Ashley Tisdale brought to life one of the most memorable comedic characters we've seen in years. This movie captures the absolutely perfect next chapter in Sharpay's life, as she tries to cultivate the humanity buried, deep, deep within her – a challenging and hilarious endeavor."

The film had Sharpay's Fabulous Adventure as a working title, before being renamed to High Stakes. According to DisneyChannelMediaNet.com, the film's title was reverted to Sharpay's Fabulous Adventure.

=== Casting ===
Former High School Musical actress Vanessa Hudgens expressed interest in making a cameo appearance in the film. On May 21, 2010, however, Tisdale told MTV that Hudgens would not appear in the film because she's "too busy promoting films and stuff" but announced there will be a special guest appearance. On June 8, Butler's involvement was announced, as well as Perry's. The name of the character played by Goodman, was never officially announced by Disney Channel, although several outlets listed the name as Lisa Lamore. During an interview on February 16, 2011, Goodman stated the name of the character she plays is Amber Lee Adams.

=== Filming ===
Principal photography began on May 25, 2010, in Toronto, Canada, and finished on July 6, 2010.

== Release ==
The film was released on DVD and Blu-ray on April 19, 2011, in three different format packages: a stand-alone DVD, a 2-disc DVD and Blu-ray combo pack, and a limited edition set which includes the film in DVD, Blu-ray, and digital download, as well as a pink clutch purse. The Blu-ray Disc includes bloopers and two featurettes: "Evolution of Sharpay" and "Austin Cam: Austin Butler Student Film." It sold 234,000 copies on its first week, debuting at number nine on the DVD sales chart. After six weeks of release, it had sold over 400,000 copies and made over $7 million in sales. Later it was aired as a Disney Channel Original Movie on Disney Channel on May 22, 2011. It is available to stream on Disney+.

== Soundtrack ==
On May 22, 2010, Tisdale confirmed she was recording music for the film. Deadline also reported four original songs are going to be featured in the film. Songwriter Amy Powers stated on her official website that Tisdale had recorded the songs "My Boi and Me" and "The Rest of My Life" (both were co-written with Matthew Tishler) for the film. In a press release by Disney Channel, "I'm Gonna Shine" (written by Randy Petersen and Kevin Quinn) and "New York's Best Kept Secret" (written by David Lawrence and Faye Greenberg) were confirmed as the other two original songs to be featured in the film.

== Reception ==
=== Critical response ===
Sharpay's Fabulous Adventure was met with mixed reviews from critics. Brian Orndorf stated "Though frivolous, Sharpay's Fabulous Adventure is an enjoyable romp with everyone's favorite pampered princess, delivering limited antics with a great deal of charisma." David Nusair of Reel Film Reviews called it "...bland and surprisingly low-rent..." James Plath said "Though Sharpay's Fabulous Adventure doesn't have the same verve or originality of the 'HSM' movies, it's still solid-pink entertainment that should delight the target audience of mostly pre-teen and early teenage girls (and boys who like Tisdale but would never, in a million years, admit it)."

The movie received 4.9 million viewers on its premiere on Disney Channel on May 22, 2011.

=== Accolades ===
The film was nominated for Outstanding Directorial Achievement in Children's Programs at the 2012 Directors Guild of America Awards.
