= Cristóbal Orellana =

- Born: Cristóbal Orellana Sierra; July 11, 1983 (age 43)
- Origin: Distrito Federal, México
- Genres: Rock, reggaeton, pop-rock, Balada
- Occupations: Actor; composer; dancer; singer
- Years active: 1999–present
- Label: Sony Music
- Formerly of: Genoma Versus
- Website: cristobalorellana.com

Cristóbal Orellana Sierra (born July 11, 1983) is a Mexican actor and singer.

== Biography ==
He was born in Mexico City. He started his musical career in Guadalajara, Jalisco, as a member of the boyband Genoma VERSUS and recorded an album named Contra el Suelo. Later joined the Disney's reality show: High School Musical: La Selección (México) where they would record together with his fellow two albums with songs performed in the program, Cristobal would win that competition by obtaining the starring role of the first movie from Disney Latinoamerica called: High School Musical: El Desafio Mexico that premiered in September 2008. This film is ranked as the third highest grossing in the premiere and the soundtrack of it sold over 50,000 copies earning a gold record.

In late 2008 and early 2009 Cristobal conduct a successful tour around the Mexican Republic by the name of High School Musical: El Desafio en Gira with the most popular repertoire of songs of the film as El Verano Termino, Siempre Juntos and Yo Sabia.

== Trajectory ==
=== Film ===
Disney High School Musical: El Desafio Mexico. (Walt Disney Pictures / 2008) Starring role.

=== TV ===
- Protagonist of TV Azteca's 2015 musical soap, UEPA, Un escenario para Amar Netflix
- Special appearance in TV Azteca's 2012 series A Corazón Abierto
- Lo que callamos las mujeres, A cada quien su santo (TV Azteca)

==== Host, performance and musical interpretation ====
- Reality show winner Disney High School Musical: La Selección (México). (Disney / TV Azteca)
- Zapping Zone (Disney Channel Latin America)
- Planeta Disney, Póker de Reinas, Venga la alegría, Disney Club, Para Todos (TV Azteca)
- Reality show contender at "Soy tu Doble" TV Show (TV Azteca)

=== Discography ===
- Disney High School Musical: El Desafio Mexico Soundtrack. ( Sony Music / 2008) Gold record.
- Disney High School Musical: La Selección (México) Vol. 1 and 2. ( Sony Music / 2007)
- Genoma VERSUS, Contra el Suelo. (Three Sound Records / 2003)
