= High School Musical =

2006 American musical TV movie

- Promotional poster
- Genre: Musical
- Written by: Peter Barsocchini
- Directed by: Kenny Ortega
- Starring: Zac Efron; Vanessa Hudgens; Ashley Tisdale; Lucas Grabeel; Alyson Reed; Corbin Bleu; Monique Coleman
- Composer: David Lawrence
- Country of origin: United States
- Original language: English

Production
- Producer: Don Schain
- Cinematography: Gordon Lonsdale
- Editor: Seth Flaum
- Running time: 98 minutes
- Production companies: Salty Pictures; First Street Films
- Budget: $4.2 million

Original release
- Network: Disney Channel
- Release: January 20, 2006

Related
- High School Musical 2

High School Musical is a 2006 American musical television film produced by and aired on Disney Channel as part of the network's slate of original television films. The first installment of the High School Musical series, the film was directed by choreographer and filmmaker Kenny Ortega from a screenplay by Peter Barsocchini. It stars Zac Efron, Vanessa Hudgens, Ashley Tisdale, Lucas Grabeel, Alyson Reed, Corbin Bleu, and Monique Coleman. High School Musical follows student Troy Bolton (Efron), the captain of his school basketball team, and Gabriella Montez (Hudgens), an academically gifted transfer student, who together audition for the lead roles in their school musical, causing division among the school's cliques.

Development for the film began after Barsocchini approached the network in 2004 with a script idea for a musical film. Disney executives also wanted to replicate the success of the musical television film The Cheetah Girls (2003), as well as the standalone musical episodes of their television series Even Stevens (2000–2003) and That's So Raven (2003–2007). Principal photography for High School Musical primarily took place in Utah, with filming locations including East High School, Murray High School, and Salt Lake City. Additional filming took place in Los Angeles. The film has been described by Barsocchini and numerous critics as a modern adaptation of Romeo & Juliet.

High School Musical premiered on Disney Channel on January 20, 2006. It became the most commercially successful Disney Channel television film. In the U.S., High School Musical generated 7.7 million viewers in its premiere broadcast, breaking the then-record for the highest premiere for the network. Internationally, the film also saw considerable success; as of 2019, over 225 million unique viewers were calculated as watched High School Musical. The film received generally positive reviews from critics, with praise for its cast and music but criticism for its sentimentality; it was more positively received by audiences. The film's soundtrack was commercially and critically successful, reaching number one on the U.S. Billboard 200 and remaining on the list for more than 100 weeks. Its lead single, "Breaking Free", reached number four on the U.S. Billboard Hot 100. Two sequels, High School Musical 2 and High School Musical 3: Senior Year, were released in August 2007 and October 2008 respectively.

== Plot ==
On New Year's Eve, high school juniors Troy Bolton and Gabriella Montez are both vacationing at a ski lodge in Utah and meet when they are called up to sing a karaoke duet together ("Start of Something New") during a party. Troy returns home to East High School in New Mexico, where he is captain of the basketball team which his father coaches. By coincidence, Gabriella has just transferred to East High, and as Troy shows Gabriella around the school, drama club president Sharpay Evans assumes that Gabriella is interested in auditioning for the school musical. The jealous Sharpay discovers Gabriella's past academic achievements, and anonymously informs scholastic decathlon captain Taylor McKessie so she will recruit Gabriella for the team. During basketball practice, Troy is distracted by thoughts of Gabriella and the idea that he might enjoy singing ("Get'cha Head in the Game").

From the back of the auditorium, Gabriella and Troy watch Sharpay and her twin brother Ryan audition for the musical with an uptempo version of "What I've Been Looking For". Troy and Gabriella step forward at the last minute, but drama teacher Ms. Darbus tells them they are too late. While helping Kelsi Nielsen, the musical's composer, pick up sheet music, they give an impromptu performance of the same song at its original ballad tempo ("What I've Been Looking For" (reprise)). Overhearing their performance, Ms. Darbus gives them a callback audition.

When the callback list is posted, Sharpay is furious that she has Gabriella as competition for the lead role, while the Wildcats basketball team is shocked that Troy has auditioned. After discovering that Troy is eager to step outside of the social norms, other students confess their secret passions and talents ("Stick to the Status Quo"). This alarms Taylor and Troy's best friend Chad Danforth, who work together to trick Gabriella into believing Troy does not care about her. Upset by what she perceives as Troy's betrayal and callous disregard for her ("When There Was Me and You"), Gabriella decides to not audition for the musical and distances herself from Troy. Realizing their mistake, Chad and Taylor admit their role in sabotaging Troy and Gabriella's relationship. Troy goes to Gabriella's house and they reconcile, determined to audition for the musical.

Overhearing Gabriella and Troy rehearse, Sharpay convinces Ms. Darbus to reschedule the callback auditions so they begin at the same time as both Troy's championship game and Gabriella's scholastic decathlon competition. The basketball and decathlon teams work together to allow Troy and Gabriella to leave by hacking the power in the gym and causing a chemical reaction that forces an evacuation during the decathlon. Troy and Gabriella rush to the auditorium as Sharpay and Ryan finish their callback song ("Bop to the Top"). After Gabriella and Troy successfully perform their song "Breaking Free", Ms. Darbus gives them the lead roles, making Sharpay and Ryan understudies. Both teams win their respective competitions, Chad asks Taylor out, Sharpay makes a truce with Gabriella, and the entire school gathers in the gym to celebrate ("We're All in This Together").

In a post-credits scene, Sharpay praises Zeke for a bag of cookies he made for her, and he says he will make her a crème brûlée.

== Cast ==
- Zac Efron as Troy Bolton, one of the most popular students at East High School and the captain of the varsity basketball team. Before Efron was cast, the role of Troy was written for a tenor, and Efron, who himself is a baritone, could not properly sing most of the parts. Singer-songwriter and actor Drew Seeley provided the majority of the character's singing voice, with Efron himself singing the first and last few lines in "Start of Something New" and the beginning of "Breaking Free".
- Vanessa Hudgens as Gabriella Montez, a transfer student who joins the scholastic decathlon team and is attracted to Troy.
- Ashley Tisdale as Sharpay Evans, an energetic and proud student with a love of theatre and being the center of attention.
- Lucas Grabeel as Ryan Evans, a member of the drama club who aids his twin sister, Sharpay, in sabotaging Gabriella's relationship with Troy.
- Alyson Reed as Ms. Darbus, the stern drama teacher at East High who dislikes sports and cell phones.
- Corbin Bleu as Chad Danforth, Troy's best friend and member of the basketball team.
- Monique Coleman as Taylor McKessie, captain of the school's scholastic decathlon team who shows Gabriella the ropes of East High.
- Bart Johnson as Jack Bolton, Troy's father and the coach of the East High basketball team who believes that Gabriella is a distraction from Troy's basketball career.
- Olesya Rulin as Kelsi Nielsen, an underappreciated pianist and composer who is initially shy and subservient to Sharpay.
- Chris Warren Jr. as Zeke Baylor, a member of the basketball team who enjoys baking and admires Sharpay.
- Ryne Sanborn as Jason Cross, a member of the basketball team who tends to ask mundane questions in class.

Additionally, Socorro Herrera plays Gabriella's mother Lisa Montez and Joey Miyashima portrays Dave Matsui, the principal of East High. Irene Santiago-Baron plays chemistry teacher Ms. Tenny, Leslie Wing Pomeroy portrays Troy's mother Lucille Bolton, and Joyce Cohen plays Ms. Falstaff the librarian.

Kaycee Stroh plays Martha Cox, a brainiac who enjoys hip-hop, and Dutch Whitlock portrays a skateboarder who also plays the cello. Anne Kathryn Parma, Nick Whitaker and Falon Grace portray Susan, Alan and Cyndra, three students who unsuccessfully audition for the musical.

== Production ==
=== Development ===
Disney executives Gary Marsh, former president of Disney Channels Worldwide, and Michael Healy, former Senior Vice President of Disney Channel's original movies, had led the production of the network's made-for-television films throughout the late 1990s and early 2000s. Television writer Peter Barsocchini approached Healy in 2004 with the desire to write a television film that his then 9-year-old daughter would enjoy. Barsocchini recalled playing basketball in high school when a teammate, Lynn Swann, confessed his aspirations of being a ballet dancer; this inspired the concept of a script where a high school basketball player held ambitions of becoming a musical theater performer. Healy and Marsh bought the idea, which would become High School Musical.

Disney Channel had also produced a musical episode of its original sitcom Even Stevens, which aired in 2002, and the success of the episode among the show's audience led to network executives asking series executive producers David Brookwell and Sean McNamara to also produce a musical episode of their other comedy series That's So Raven. The success of the musical format on both Even Stevens and That's So Raven gave executives confidence in the appeal and interest of the musical genre, and led to the early development of the idea for High School Musical. Marsh stated that High School Musical would not have been developed if not for the success of the Even Stevens musical episode. Additionally, the television film The Cheetah Girls (2003) is recognized as Disney Channel's first musical film.

Producer Bill Borden said in 2006 that High School Musical was the first of three planned films in the series.

=== Filming ===
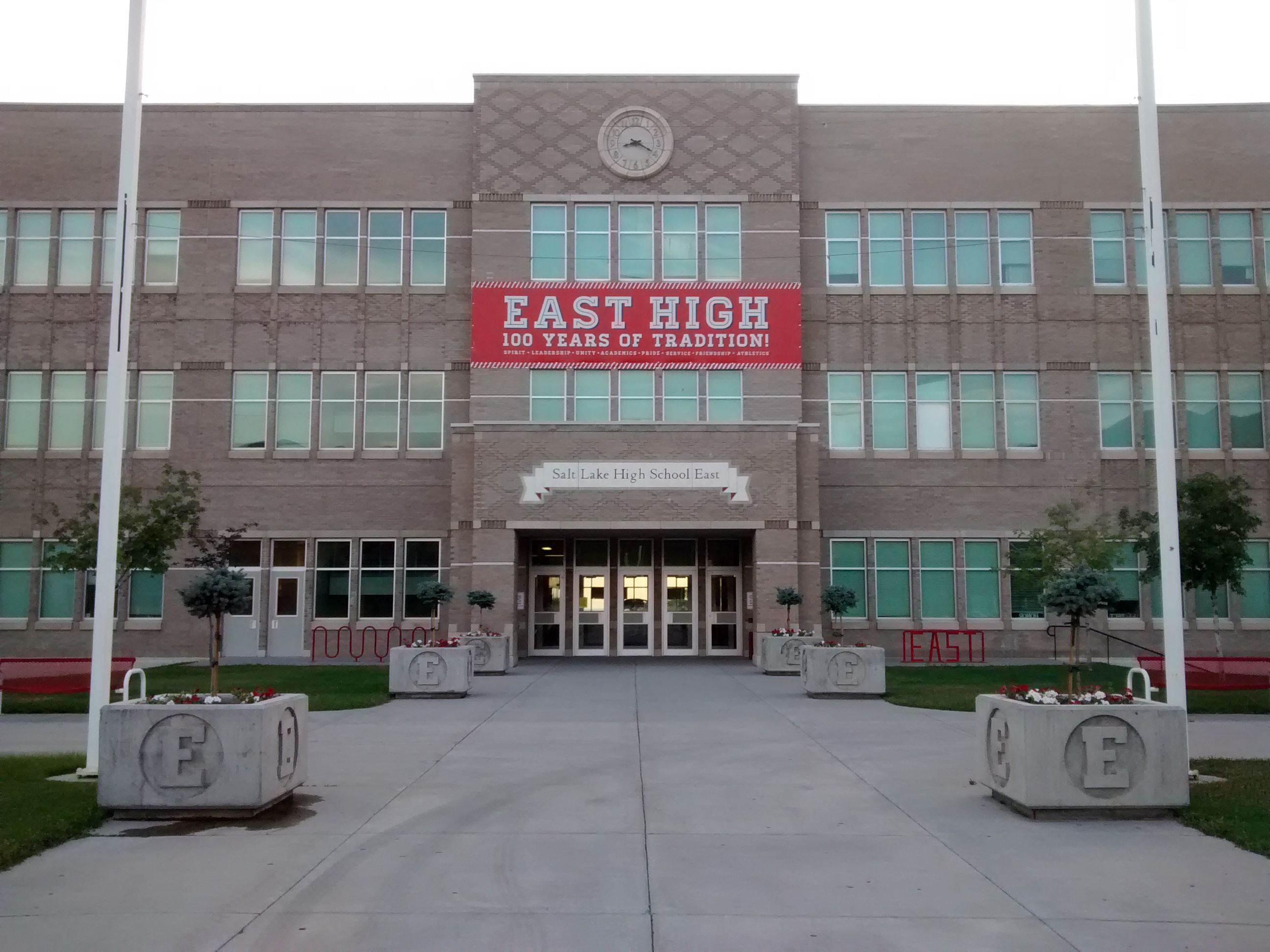
Filming took place at East High School in Utah.

High School Musical was filmed in the summer of 2005. Principal photography took place in Utah in East High School. High School Musical was filmed on a budget of US$4.2 million.

=== Choreography ===
The film's musical numbers were choreographed by director Kenny Ortega in collaboration with Bonnie Story and Charles Klapow. In a January 2026 interview with Dance Spirit, Klapow recalled that the team had approximately ten days to choreograph and rehearse the numbers before a 21-day filming schedule. Ortega, Story and Klapow worked together in morning choreography sessions, followed by rehearsals with the principal cast and ensemble dancers.

Klapow described Story's contribution to the basketball-themed number "Get'cha Head in the Game", recalling how she adapted his initial movement ideas to better communicate the scene's story and character motivations. Ortega also recalled that many of the performers in the basketball sequence were students from the school where filming took place, with dancers and basketball players helping one another learn the required skills.

=== Music ===
The soundtrack for the film was released on January 10, 2006, and debuted at number 133 on the Billboard 200, selling 7,469 copies in its first week. In the album's third week, for the chart dated February 11, 2006, it climbed to number ten, subsequently rose to number one on the Billboard 200 twice (on March 1 and 22) and had shipped 3.8 million copies as of December 5, 2006. More than three million copies had been sold by August 2006 and it was certified quadruple platinum by the RIAA. As of January 10, 2023 the soundtrack had been certified 5× platinum by the RIAA.

== Reception ==
Upon its premiere, the film attracted 7.7 million viewers. On Rotten Tomatoes, the film holds an approval rating of 67% based on 21 reviews, with an average rating of 5.7/10. The website's critics consensus reads: "High School Musical is brazenly saccharine, but it makes up for it with its memorable show tunes, eye-popping choreography, and appealing cast."

Common Sense Media rated the film four out of five stars. Kevin Carr gave the film a score of three out of five, saying, "The filmmakers were just trying to tell a story. Sex, drugs and violence just didn't factor into that equation." On the other hand, David Nusair gave the film a negative review with a score of 1.5/4 saying, "...it's difficult to imagine even the most die-hard fan of musicals finding anything here worth embracing." Scott Weinberg also gave the film a negative review saying, "A schmaltzy little piece of obvious fluff that's directed in truly horrendous fashion and populated by cardboard characters who spit out simplistic platitudes and breathy pop tunes."

While High School Musical was filmed on a budget of US$4.2 million, the film's success allowed Disney Channel to increase the budgets on their future television films. The network subsequently developed more "tentpole" films driven by music or based on popular franchises.

== Home media ==
The DVD went on sale on May 23, 2006, under the title, High School Musical: Encore Edition. It created a sales record when 1.2 million copies were sold in its first six days, making it the fastest-selling television film of all time. It is, however, the second DCOM (Disney Channel Original Movie) on DVD to be certified Platinum in DVD sales, the first being The Cheetah Girls. The High School Musical DVD was also released in Australia on July 12, 2006, through Walt Disney, as well as on European Region 2 on December 4, 2006, where it went on to reach number one in the UK DVD charts. It also aired on Disney Channel South Africa, the latest Disney channel at that time in the southern hemisphere. It was the top-selling DVD in Australia in August 2006. High School Musical also became the first Disney Channel Original Movie to be released on Region 3 DVD, when it went on sale on October 10 and December 15 in Hong Kong and Taiwan, respectively. It was released in Mexico on November 10 and in Brazil on December 6 to coincide with Christmas and the Rede Globo broadcast of the film. It was released in New Zealand on July 12, 2006, and was awarded most popular pre-teen movie in New Zealand for 2006.

High School Musical was the first feature-length video content from the iTunes Store in mid-March 2006. At the time, it was available as a 320x240 resolution 487MB download for $9.99 after initially being mistakenly listed for $1.99.

The Remix Edition, a 2-disc Special Edition, was released on December 5, 2006. The Remix DVD went on sale in France on June 20, 2007. in Germany on September 13, 2007, and in the UK on September 10, 2007. As of 2010, the film has sold eight million DVD units, earning an operating income of $100 million.

Despite being filmed in the 16:9 (1.78:1) aspect ratio, both the original and Remix Edition DVD releases featured a 4:3 (1.33:1) "full screen" version (though not pan and scan as the camera stays directly in the center of the image), the format of the film as shown on the Disney Channel. The widescreen, high definition version is available exclusively on Disney Blu-ray in North America and has subsequently been showing in the UK and Ireland on BBC One and BBC HD, and RTÉ One. The HD version is also available on the video section of PlayStation Store, as well as on Sony Entertainment online for the US market.

== Expanded franchise ==
=== Sequels and spin-off ===
A sequel, High School Musical 2, premiered on August 17, 2007, on Disney Channel in the U.S., and on Family in Canada. The premiere brought in a total of 17.3 million viewers in the United States—almost 10 million more than its predecessor—making it (at the time of its airing) the highest-rated Disney Channel Original Movie to date and the most viewed television film to date.

A third film, High School Musical 3: Senior Year, was theatrically released in the United States on October 24, 2008. Kenny Ortega returned as director and choreographer, as did all six main actors.

Sharpay's Fabulous Adventure is a spin-off and direct-to-DVD film starring Ashley Tisdale. The film follows Sharpay Evans as she sets out to earn a role in a Broadway show following graduation. The film was released as a Blu-ray and DVD combination pack on April 19, 2011.

In early 2016, Disney announced that a fourth installment of the series was "in the works", later announcing a casting call for the film, tentatively referred to as High School Musical 4. In March 2016, details about the film's prospective principal characters were reported.

=== Television adaptation ===
In 2019, Disney announced a new television series based on the High School Musical franchise that was released on Disney+ on November 12, 2019. Titled High School Musical: The Musical: The Series and filmed as a mockumentary, it focuses on a newly-enrolled set of East High students putting together a stage production of High School Musical.

=== Foreign adaptations ===
High School Musical: El desafio (Argentina) is a spin-off for the Argentine market, based on the book "Battle of the Bands". The film arrived in Argentine theatres on July 17, 2008. High School Musical: O Desafio is a spin-off of the American film High School Musical. The Brazilian spin-off is based on the book Battle of the Bands. The film was released in Brazilian theatres on February 5, 2010. Disney High School Musical China (歌舞青春), also called High School Musical China: College Dreams is a Chinese version of the American series, released in North America on DVD under the Disney World Cinema Brand.

Film Business Asia critic Derek Elley rated the adaptation three points out of ten and called the choreography by former Madonna dancer, Ruthy Inchaustegui, and songs "bland". However, Elley picked the three songs as "half-memorable": "the ballad 'Rainy Season' (梅雨季) [sung by] two lead[ing characters,] the glitzy 'Perfection' (完美) [by] the college rich-bitch[,] and [the] climatic 'I Can Fly' (我飛故我在), which doesn't quite succeed at being an anthemnal [sic], uplifting ballad."

=== Stage adaptations ===
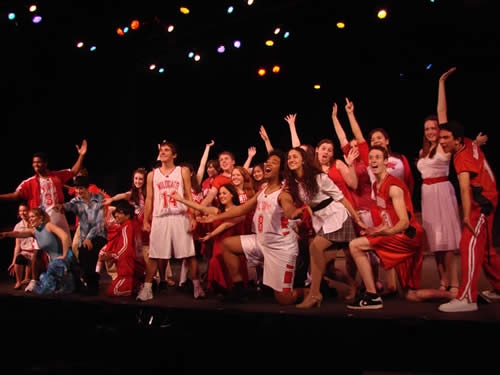
Pacific Repertory Theatre's School of Dramatic Arts production of Disney's High School Musical

On August 1, 2006, Playbill announced that the Stagedoor Manor summer theater camp, featured in the film Camp, would be the first venue to produce High School Musical on-stage. The High School Musical: The Concert tour started on November 29, 2006, kicking off in San Diego, California. The tour continued until January 28, 2007, performing in major cities around the United States, Canada, and Latin America. The concert featured all of the original cast members except for Zac Efron, who was shooting Hairspray. Efron was replaced by Drew Seeley (whose voice was blended with Efron's during the film). The concert featured the original songs from the film, as well as songs from Vanessa Hudgens, Ashley Tisdale, and Corbin Bleu.

"Feld Entertainment" produced global tour titled, High School Musical: The Ice Tour which had its world premiere in New York City on September 29, 2007. The cast included 2004 World Junior Bronze Medalist Jordan Brauninger and 2004–2005 Australian national champion Bradley Santer. The show contained elements and songs from both the original film and its sequel, High School Musical 2 and featured a special preview of High School Musical 3: Senior Year when the movie of the same name premiered in theatres.

=== Merchandise ===
In June 2006, Disney Press published High School Musical: The Junior Novel, a novelization of the film. It reached number one on the New York Times best-selling list and remained on the list for sixteen weeks. By August 2007, the novel had sold more than 4.5 million copies, with 1 million copies of the novel's follow-up, High School Musical 2: The Junior Novel, being shipped to American retailers. High School Musical 3: Senior Year: The Junior Novel was released on September 23, 2008.

Shortly after the release of the original novel, Disney announced that a book series, entitled Stories from East High, would be published in February 2007 with a new book being published every 60 days until July 2008. Disney Interactive Studios has produced 6 video games (High School Musical: Sing It!, High School Musical: Makin' the Cut!, High School Musical 2: Work This Out DS, High School Musical 3: Senior Year DANCE!, High School Musical 3: Senior Year DS and Disney Sing It! - High School Musical 3: Senior Year) based on the High School Musical series, all taking the guise of music video games incorporating songs and plots from the films.

== Awards and nominations ==
Year	Award	Category	Recipient(s) and nominee(s)	Result
2006	American Music Award	Best Pop Album	High School Musical (soundtrack)	Nominated
2006	ASTRA Awards	Favorite International Program	High School Musical	Won
2006	Billboard Music Award	Soundtrack Album of the Year	High School Musical (soundtrack)	Won
2006	Billboard Music Award	Album of the Year	High School Musical (soundtrack)	Nominated
2006	Humanitas Prize	Children's Live Action Category	Peter Barsocchini	Won
2006	Imagen Foundation Awards	Best Actress – Television	Vanessa Hudgens	Nominated
2006	Nickelodeon Australian Kids' Choice Awards	Fave Movie	High School Musical	Won
2006	Nickelodeon UK Kids' Choice Awards	Best TV Actor	Zac Efron	Won
2006	Primetime Emmy Award	Outstanding Choreography	Kenny Ortega, Charles Klapow, and Bonnie Story	Won
2006	Primetime Emmy Award	Outstanding Children's Program	Don Schain, Bill Borden, and Barry Rosenbush	Won
2006	Primetime Emmy Award	Outstanding Directing for a Miniseries, Movie, or a Special	Kenny Ortega	Nominated
2006	Primetime Emmy Award	Outstanding Casting for a Miniseries, Movie, or a Special	Jason La Padura and Natalie Hart	Nominated
2006	Primetime Emmy Award	Outstanding Original Music and Lyrics	Get'cha Head in the Game sung by Zac Efron and written by Ray Cham, Greg Cham, and Drew Seeley	Nominated
2006	Primetime Emmy Award	Outstanding Original Music and Lyrics	Breaking Free sung by Zac Efron and Vanessa Hudgens and written by Jamie Houston	Nominated
2006	Satellite Award	Best Motion Picture Made for Television	High School Musical	Nominated
2006	Television Critics Association Awards	Outstanding Achievement in Children's Programming	High School Musical	Won
2006	Teen Choice Award	Television – Choice Breakout Star	Zac Efron	Won
2006	Teen Choice Award	Television – Choice Chemistry	Vanessa Hudgens and Zac Efron	Won
2006	Teen Choice Award	Television – Choice Comedy or Musical Show	High School Musical	Won
2006	Teen Choice Award	Television – Choice Breakout Star	Vanessa Hudgens	Nominated
2007	Casting Society of America	Best Children's TV Programming	Jason La Padura and Natalie Hart	Won
2007	Costume Designers Guild Awards	Outstanding Made for Television Movie or Miniseries	Tom McKinley	Nominated
2007	Directors Guild of America Award	Outstanding Directorial Achievement in Children's Program	Kenny Ortega, Don Schain, Matias Alvarez and Tobijah Tyler	Won
2007	Golden Reel Award	Best Sound Editing in Music for Television – Long Form	Carli Barber and Michael Dittrick	Won
2007	Image Award	Outstanding Children's Program	High School Musical	Nominated
2007	Image Award	Outstanding Performance in a Youth/Children's Program – Series or Special	Corbin Bleu	Nominated
2007	PGA Awards	Outstanding Producer of Long–Form Television	Bill Borden and Barry Rosenbush	Nominated
2007	Young Artist Award	Best Performance in a TV Movie, Miniseries or Special (Comedy or Drama) – Leading Young Actor	Zac Efron	Nominated
2007	Young Artist Award	Best Performance in a TV Movie, Miniseries or Special (Comedy or Drama) – Leading Young Actress	Vanessa Hudgens)	Nominated
2007	Young Artist Award	Best Performance in a TV Movie, Miniseries or Special (Comedy or Drama) – Supporting Young Actor	Corbin Bleu	Nominated
2007	Young Artist Award	Best Family Television Movie or Special	High School Musical	Nominated
