= Jordan Brauninger =

American figure skater (born 1987)

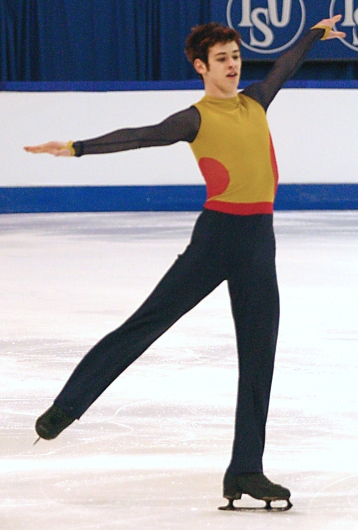
- Brauninger competes in 2005

Personal information
- Born: January 19, 1987 (age 39) Cincinnati, Ohio, U.S.
- Height: 6 ft 2 in (1.88 m)

Figure skating career
- Country: United States
- Discipline: Men's singles
- Skating club: Northern Kentucky SC
- Began skating: 1992
- Retired: 2005–06
Medal record
World Junior Championships
| Bronze medal – third place | 2004 The Hague | Men's singles |

Jordan Brauninger (born January 19, 1987) is an American former competitive figure skater. He is the 2004 World Junior bronze medalist.

== Career ==
Brauninger began skating at age five. He played ice hockey for three years and switched to figure skating after meeting Sergei Grinkov. He competed first as a pair skater with Samantha Skavdahl. He landed his first triple toe loop at the age of eleven and his first triple Axel when he was 16. He trained in Crescent Springs, Kentucky, coached by Stephanie Miller and Ted Masdea. He represented Northern Kentucky SC.

Brauninger retired from competitive skating during the 2005–06 season. On June 27, 2007, Disney announced that Brauninger would play the role of Troy Bolton in Disney's High School Musical: The Ice Tour.

== Personal life ==
Brauninger was born January 19, 1987, in Cincinnati, Ohio, and was home schooled. He lives in Ludlow, Kentucky. He married Lea Nightwalker, a Colorado figure skater, on June 1, 2014, in Fort Collins, Colorado. They divorced shortly after.

== Programs ==
| Season | Short program | Free skating |
|---|---|---|
| 2005–2006 | In the Garden of Souls by David | Piano Concerto in D by Arthur Bliss |
| 2003–2004 | Summertime by George Gershwin | Patton by Jerry Goldsmith Royal Scottish National Orchestra |
| 2002–2003 | Fire by J. Hendrix | In the South by Elgar performed by the London Symphony Orchestra |

== Competitive highlights ==
JGP: Junior Grand Prix

International
| Event | 2001–02 | 2002–03 | 2003–04 | 2004–05 | 2005–06 |
|---|---|---|---|---|---|
| Junior Worlds | | | 3rd | 4th | |
| JGP Final | | 6th | 4th | | |
| JGP Andorra | | | | | 7th |
| JGP France | | 3rd | | 5th | |
| JGP Hungary | | | | 5th | |
| JGP Japan | | | 4th | | |
| JGP Mexico | | | 1st | | |
| JGP Slovakia | | 4th | | | |
| Triglav Trophy | | 1st J. | | | |
National
| U.S. Champ. | 5th J. | 2nd J. | 10th | 11th | |
J. = Junior
