= High School Musical: el desafío (2008 Mexican film) =

- Theatrical release poster
- Directed by: Eduardo Ripari
- Written by: Pablo Lago; Susana Cardozo
- Starring: Cristóbal Orellana; Mariana Magaña; Mar Contreras; Fernando Soberanes; Jorge Blanco
- Cinematography: Marcelo Iaccarino
- Edited by: Juan Carlos Macías
- Music by: Alejandro Kauderer; Emilio Kauderer
- Production companies: Patagonik Film Group; The Walt Disney Company (México) S.A.; TV Azteca
- Distributed by: Walt Disney Studios Motion Pictures International (Note: Distributed through the Walt Disney Pictures banner.)
- Release date: September 5, 2008
- Running time: 103 minutes
- Country: Mexico
- Language: Spanish

High School Musical: el desafío is a spin-off film, to the High School Musical franchise. It is one of three feature film adaptations of a script written by Pablo Lago and Susana Cardozo and based on the book Battle of the Bands. The film stars the finalists of the reality television High School Musical: La Selección competition series, created with participation of the musical duo Jesse & Joy. To coincide with the Mexican target audience, some of the soundtrack is of the reggaeton genre.

High School Musical: el desafío premiered in Mexico on September 5, 2008. The premiere was held on August 24, 2008, at the Auditorio Nacional in Mexico City.

== Plot ==
Cristóbal (Cristóbal Orellana), the captain of the school football team, "Los Borregos", discovers that his neighbor and classmate, Mariana (Mariana Magaña), has changed a lot over the summer. Meanwhile, Luli (Mar Contreras) is still as vain as ever and overshadows her poor brother, Fernando (Fernando Soberanes), and his companions, whom she refers to as "The Invisibles." A new school year begins at High School Mexico (HSM, initially interpreted), and the school has announced a "Battle of the Bands" contest hosted by Jesse and Joy, from the duo Jesse & Joy. Working against the clock and with limited resources, the guys put forces for the big day. Cristobal, Mariana, and a few of their peers, come together and form a band called "Fair Play". In an effort to win, Luli dares the impossible task of separating Cristobal from his friends. But only one band will be the winner; the one who understands that teamwork, personal development, and hard work will make them better artists and also better people.

== Cast of characters ==
Main Cast
| Actor | Character | Parallel | Notes |
|---|---|---|---|
| Cristóbal Orellana | Cristóbal Rodríguez | Troy Bolton | Soccer team captain for the Borregos. |
| Mariana Magaña | Mariana Galindo | Gabriella Montez | Shy and brainy, Mariana is also a talented singer. |
| Mar Contreras | Luli Casas Del Campo | Sharpay Evans | Fernando's fraternal twin sister; the undisputed star of the school. |
| Fernando Soberanes | Fernando Casas Del Campo | Ryan Evans | Luli's fraternal twin brother who acts as her lackey until he's recruited to choreograph for Cristobal's band. |
| Juan Carlos Flores | Juan Carlos | Chad Danforth | Cristóbal's best friend |
Supporting Cast
| Actor | Character | Parallel | Notes |
| Fabiola Paulin | Faby | Taylor McKessie | |
| Jorge Blanco | Jorge Blanco | Jason Cross | |
| César Viramontes | César | Zeke Baylor | He likes to cook and member of team Borregos. |
| Paulina Holguin | Pau | Emma | A member of Luli's clique |
| Carolina Ayala | Caroline | Jackie | A member of Luli's clique |
| Juan Manuel Bernal | Mr. Rodrigues | Jack Bolton | The father of Cristobal. |
| Lumi Cavazos | Mrs. Galindo | Lisa Montez | The mother of Mariana. |
| Lisa Owen | Mrs. Casas Del Campo | Darby Evans | The mother of Luli and Fernando. |
| Victor Martin Hugg | Mr. Casas Del Campo | Vance Evans | The father of Luli and Fernando. |
| Álvaro Guerrero | Mr. Guerrero | Principal Matsui | The school principal. |
| Carmen Beato | Angelina | Ms. Darbus | The school teacher |
| Joy Huerta | Joy | | |
| Jesse Huerta | Jesse | | |
| Carla Medina | Marifé | | |
| Roger González | Cook | | |
| Stephie Camarena | Stephie | | |

== Music ==
The film's soundtrack was released on August 15, 2008, and features the same songs composed by Fernando López Rossi for the Argentine incarnation, but with different arrangements (e.g. reggaeton). The soundtrack also includes a cover of "Dime Ven" from Mexican band Motel and the song "La Vida Es Una Aventura", performed by Jesse & Joy.

1. El Verano Terminó (High School Musical: El Desafio cast)
2. Siempre Juntos (High School Musical: El Desafio cast)
3. La Vida Es Una Aventura (Mariana Magaña, Fernando Soberanes)
4. Yo Sabia (Cristóbal Orellana, Mariana Magaña)
5. A Buscar El Sol (Mariana Magaña)
6. Hoy Todo Es Mejor (Cristóbal Orellana)
7. Dime Ven (High School Musical: El Desafio cast)
8. Superstar (Mar Contreras, Paulina Holguin, Fabiola Paulin, Carolina Ayala)
9. Mejor Hacerlo Todos Juntos (Cristóbal Orellana, Mariana Magaña Mariana, Fernando Soberanes, Juan Carlos Flores, Jorge Blanco, Stephie Camarena, Cesar Viramontes)
10. Actuar, Bailar, Cantar (High School Musical: El Desafio cast)
11. Doo Up (Mar Contreras, Fernando Soberanes) [Bonus Track]

=== Chart positions ===
==== Weekly charts ====
| Chart (2008) | Peak position |
|---|---|
| Mexican Albums (AMPROFON) | 3 |

==== Year-end charts ====
| Chart (2008) | Position |
|---|---|
| Mexican Albums (AMPROFON) | 60 |

== Home media ==
The DVD was released on December 2, 2008, five months sooner than previously advertised.

1. The Summer Ended (Music Video)
2. Segments of "Express" from Disney Channel
3. Commercial: "The Challenge Behind the Dream" from Disney Channel

=== Novel ===
High School Musical: el desafío was transcribed into a novel, and was released by Random House. The book contains 8 pages of stills from the film.
