= High School Musical: Makin' the Cut! =

2007 video game

- Developer: A2M
- Publisher: Disney Interactive Studios
- Platform: Nintendo DS
- Release: NA: August 14, 2007; EU: October 19, 2007; AU: November 15, 2007
- Genre: Music video game
- Modes: Single player, Multiplayer

High School Musical: Makin' the Cut! is a video game based on the 2006 television movie High School Musical available for the Nintendo DS. It was featured on Disney 365, airing on Disney Channel, hosted by Chester at the time.

== Gameplay ==
The main game's gameplay is a takeoff of the Japanese rhythm game Osu! Tatakae! Ouendan.

Songs are sung by cover artists, and not the original artists.

It starts when Sharpay signed up the gang auditioning for a national music competition. They have problems in between (i.e.: Taylor thinking Chad is cheating on her, while Chad was just scared of heights since the other part of the competition would be held at a high altitude).

There are three different types of gameplay: Dance, music, and video making showdowns.

== Songs ==
- Start of Something New
- Get'cha Head in the Game
- What I've Been Looking For
- What I've Been Looking For (Reprise)
- Stick to the Status Quo
- When There Was Me and You
- Bop to the Top
- Breaking Free
- I Can't Take My Eyes Off of You
- We're All in This Together
- What Time Is It?
- I Don't Dance

== Reception ==
Reception

Aggregate score
Aggregator	Score
Metacritic	67/100

Review scores
Publication	Score
GameZone	7.3/10
IGN	7.5/10
Jeuxvideo.com	8/20
NGamer	40%
PALGN	7/10
Common Sense Media	3/5

The game received "average" reviews according to the review aggregation website Metacritic.

== See also ==
- High School Musical
- High School Musical 2
- High School Musical 3: Senior Year
- High School Musical: El desafio (Argentina)
