= High School Musical: el desafío (2008 Argentine film) =

- Theatrical release poster
- Directed by: Jorge Nisco
- Written by: Pablo Lago
- Starring: Fernando Dente; Agustina Vera; Delfina Peña; Walter Bruno
- Music by: Fernando López Rossi
- Production companies: Patagonik Film Group; The Walt Disney Company (Argentina) S.A.; Artear Argentina
- Distributed by: Walt Disney Studios Motion Pictures International (Note: Distributed through the Walt Disney Pictures banner.)
- Release date: July 17, 2008
- Running time: 98 minutes
- Country: Argentina
- Language: Spanish
- Box office: $6 million

High School Musical: el desafío is a spin-off film to the High School Musical franchise. It is one of three feature film adaptations of a script written by Pablo Lago and Susana Cardozo and based on the book Battle of the Bands. The film stars the finalists of the Argentine reality television High School Musical: La Selección competition series, and features Andrea del Boca, Adriana Salonia, Peter McFarlane, and Liz Solari.

Principal photography commenced in February 2008, and is notable for being the first Disney-branded feature film made in Latin America. The film was developed for theatrical release in the Argentina market. Eight new songs have been produced exclusively for the film. In addition to these songs, Alejandro Lerner also composed the main theme, which he performed.

High School Musical: el desafío was released in Argentine theaters on July 17, 2008, reaching in its debut week second place in the national box-office charts.

== Plot ==
A new school year begins at the High School Argentina (HSA), and the students return from the summer vacations. Fer, the captain of the school rugby team, the Jaguars, discovers that Agus, his neighbour and classmate, has changed a lot over the summer. Delfi, however, continues being vain and wastes her time dominating her poor brother, Walter, and her associates Alicia, Clara and Valeria, or, as she prefers to call them, "The Invisibles".

The principal of the school and Ms. D'Arts, the art teacher, invite the students to take part in the school's first battle of the bands, where the kids will have a chance to be showcased as true music stars. Anne-Claire, a former student and now a famous singer, comes to the school as adviser to the contest. Delfi envies her greatly.

Working against the clock and with limited resources, the kids put all the forces for the big day. Fer and Agus, together with Juanchi, Sofi, Facha, Gaston and Walter participate in the contest, forming a band called the Scrum. At the same time, Delfi participates with her friends, and she tries the impossible task of separating Walter from his new friends. But only one band could be the winner, the one that understood teamwork, personal development, and studying would make them better artists and also better people.

== Characters ==
=== Main ===
- Fer (Fernando Dente) is the male protagonist of the film. He is the most popular boy at High School Argentina, and the captain of the varsity rugby team, the Jaguars. He faces a new challenge this year in the school: forming a band for the Battle of the Bands, where he will show, despite the difficulties, his true leadership. He is similar to Troy Bolton from the English film.
- Agus (Agustina Vera) is the female protagonist of the film. She is the shy and studious student who, under the astonished eyes of all her peers, suddenly becomes an attractive young girl with a talent for singing. When she feels insecure, Anne-Claire encourages her to be herself and exhibit her artistic talents without fears. She is similar to Gabriella Montez from the English film.
- Delfi (Delfina Peña) is the antagonist of the film. She is the stereotypical "rich girl", vain, selfish, someone who does not spare a second for anyone, not even for her brother Walter. She is only nice when she wants something and her goal is for everyone in the school to love her. At the end of the film, she learns from her mistakes and learns a valuable lesson. She is similar to Sharpay Evans from the English film.
- Walter (Walter Bruno) is Delfi's brother. He wants to be independent from his sister and his goal is to become the coach of Fer's band. With help from Agus, and with his perseverance and recklessness, Walter manages to become independent and show his true artistic abilities. He is similar to Ryan Evans from the English film.

=== Other students ===
- Gastón (Gastón Vietto) is Fer's best friend, he has a deep love for Anne-Claire. There is nothing in the world he wouldn't do for her. He is similar to Zeke Baylor from the English film.
- Juanchi (Juan Macedonio). Juanchi is a hilarious person. He will never stop cracking jokes. Everyone loves his sense of humour. He is also a very good drummer. He is similar to Chad Danforth from the English film.
- Facha (Augusto Buccafusco). Facha is a klutz. All he wants is to be able to play his guitar but he always messes up during performances. In an important performance, Anne-Claire helps him out at a crucial moment. He is similar to Jason Cross from the English film.
- Sofi (Sofía Agüero Petros) is a talented composer who is part of Fer's band. She thrives under pressure and creates great music. She is similar to Kelsi Nielsen from the English film.
- Vale (Valeria Baroni) is a great singer, but she is always over shadowed by Delfi. She is similar to Taylor McKessie from the English film.
- Clarita and Alicia (María Clara Alonso and Sophie Oliver Sánchez) are Delfi's best friends and members of her band. The two girls are completely okay with all of Delfi's shenanigans. They are similar to the Sharpettes from the English film.

=== Supporting ===
- Ms. D'Arts (Andrea del Boca) is the school's art teacher, who, together with the principal, organises the Battle of the Bands. She is similar to Ms. Darbus of the English film.
- Anne-Claire (Liz Solari) is the adviser of the contest. She is a former student of the school and is a famous musician.
- Fer's Dad (Mauricio Dayub) is the coach of the school's rugby team. He makes his players work very hard. He is similar to Jack Bolton from the English film.

=== Minor characters ===
- Agus' Mum (Adriana Salonia)
- Donato (Daniel Martins)
- Marta (Carolina Ibarra)
- The High School Principal (Peter McFarlane)

== Premiere ==
The special premiere took place on July 14, 2008 at the Gran Rex Theater. Following the film, the cast and the director, Jorge Nisco, went to the Alvear Hotel for a photo session and a press conference.

The film debuted in cinemas throughout Argentina on July 17, 2008.

== Soundtrack ==
High School Musical: el desafío

Soundtrack album by Cast of HSM: El Desafio
- Released: June 17, 2008
- Recorded: 2007
- Genre: Pop, teen pop, pop rock, musical theatre
- Label: Sony BMG
- Producer: Fernando López Rossi

Cast of HSM: El Desafio chronology
Sueños (2007)	High School Musical: el desafío (2008)

Professional ratings
Review scores
Source	Rating
Musimundo	link

Before the release of the film, the film's soundtrack CD was released, featuring eight new songs produced by Fernando López Rossi. The album has a bonus track with the song "Now Is Time to Shine" (originally in Spanish, "Ya es tiempo de brillar") written by Alejandro Lerner especially for the film, and includes the music video of the song "Summer Has Ended" ("El Verano Terminó").

=== List of songs ===
#	Song	Performed by
1	El Verano Terminó (Summer Has Ended)	All
2	Siempre Juntos (Forever Together)	The Jaguars
3	Doo up	Delfy and Walter
4	Yo sabía... (I Knew...)	Agus and Fer
5	A Buscar el Sol (Look for the Sun)	Agus
6	Hoy Todo es Mejor (Today Everything is Better)	Fer
7	Superstar	Delfi and The Shadows (Vale, Clara and Alicia)
8	Mejor Hacerlo Todo Juntos (It's Better Doing It All Together)	Agus, Fer, Juanchi, Gaston, Facha and Sofi
9	Actuar, Bailar, Cantar (Act, Dance, Sing)	All
10	Ya es Hora de Brillar (Now It Is Time to Shine)	Alejandro Lerner
BT	El Verano Terminó (Video) (Summer Has Ended (Video))	All

== Other international versions ==
Following this production in Argentina, the film was also remade for Mexico and in Brazil:

- In Mexico, as in Argentina, the winners were chosen by a contest (HSM: La Selección), from which Cristobal Orellana and Mariana Magaña emerged to play the leads. The antagonists were not cast from the contest; they were played by Cesar Fernando Soberanes and Mar Contreras. This version generally used the same dialogue (although the wording varied to reflect the Mexican version of Spanish) and songs as the Argentine version, although the songs were adapted with a reggaeton and hip hop style to appeal to the Mexican public. Ironically, the Mexican version was also filmed in Argentina. The Mexican version premiered on September 4, 2008.
- In Brazil, the finalists were chosen on HSM - A Seleção. From there emerged Renata Pinto Gomes Ferreira and Olavo Setembro Cavalheiro as the leads, along with Paula Pereia Barbosa and Fellipe Ferreira Guadanucci as the antagonists. The Brazilian version premiered in February 2010.
