= Alyson Reed =

American dancer and actress

- Born: Anaheim, California, U.S.
- Occupations: Actress; dancer; singer
- Years active: 1978–present

Alyson Reed is an American dancer and actress, best known for appearing as Cassie in A Chorus Line (1985) and Ms. Darbus in the High School Musical trilogy (2006–2008).

== Early life ==
Reed was born and raised in Anaheim, California. She graduated from Anaheim High School in 1976.

== Career ==
Reed made her Broadway debut in Dancin' in 1978. At 20, she joined the national touring production of Pippin. Additional Broadway credits include Oh Brother, Dance a Little Closer, Cabaret, A Grand Night for Singing, and Marilyn: An American Fable. She was nominated for the Tony Award for Best Featured Actress in a Musical for Cabaret at the 42nd Tony Awards in 1988 and the Drama Desk Award for Outstanding Actress in a Musical for Marilyn in 1984. In 1992, she starred opposite Michael O'Keefe in the national touring company of A Few Good Men in the role of Lt. Cmdr. Joanne Galloway, and also toured as Cassie/Val in A Chorus Line, and Catherine in Pippin. She has numerous regional credits and can be heard on various cast albums.

Reed portrayed Cassie in Richard Attenborough's film adaptation of A Chorus Line, and she also appeared in the comedy Skin Deep with John Ritter.

In 1990, Reed relocated to Los Angeles. Her many television credits range from: Modern Family, Mad Men, Grey's Anatomy, Bones, Matlock, L.A. Law, Murder, She Wrote, Frasier, Law & Order, Without a Trace, ER, Judging Amy, Chicago Hope, The X-Files, CSI: Crime Scene Investigation, Nip/Tuck, Crossing Jordan, Numb3rs, Boston Legal, NYPD Blue and Desperate Housewives.

She became known to younger viewers for the role of Ms. Darbus in the popular Disney Channel movie High School Musical and its sequels High School Musical 2 and High School Musical 3: Senior Year.

Reed lent her voice to the video game Diablo III, providing the voice of the witch Adria.

== Filmography ==
Year	Title	Role	Notes
1985	A Chorus Line	Cassie	Film
1990	Matlock	Chrissie Dubin	Episode: "The Cookie Monster"
1990	WIOU	Det. Beekler	Episodes: "Do the Wrong Thing", "Mother Nature's Son"
1991	L.A. Law	Joan Dawson	Episode: "Rest in Pieces"
1991	DEA	Ginny Taylor	Episodes: "White Lies", "Zero Sum Game"
1991	The Family Man	Doctor	Episode: "Scenes from a Marriage"
1991	Jake and the Fatman	Beth Fitzroy	Episode: "I'll Never Be the Same"
1993	The Disappearance of Nora	Phyllis	Television film
1993	Lost in the Wild	Tommy	Television film
1994	Ghostwriter	Honey Hawke	Recurring role, 4 episodes
1995	Law & Order	M.E. Heather Coyle	Episode: "Seed"
1995	Frasier	Cindy Carruthers	Episode: "Someone to Watch Over Me"
1995	Murder, She Wrote	Wendy Maitlin	Episode: "Game, Set, Murder"
1995–1999	Party of Five	Mrs. Reeves	Recurring role, 9 episodes
1996	The Secret She Carried	Donna Snow	Television film
1996	Murphy Brown	Waitress	Episode: "The Bus Stops Here"
1996	Sisters	Virginia Sprague	Episode: "Dreamcatcher"
1996	Norma Jean & Marilyn	Natalie Kelly	Television film
2001	Taking Back Our Town	Roseanne	Television film
2001–2003	The Agency	Lesley Turnbull	Recurring role, 5 episodes
2002	Providence	Lenore Decker	Recurring role, 4 episodes
2004	George Lopez	Mrs. Reynolds	Episode: "Why You Crying?"
2005	Numbers	Eva Salton	Episode: "Structural Corruption"
2006	High School Musical	Ms. Darbus	Disney Channel Original Movie
2007	High School Musical 2	Ms. Darbus	Disney Channel Original Movie
2008	High School Musical 3: Senior Year	Ms. Darbus	Film
2012	Desperate Housewives	Judge Conti	Episode: "Give Me the Blame"
2012	Mad Men	Ruth Harris	Episode: "Mystery Date"
2013	Bones	Susan Lauderbach	Episode: "The Mystery in the Meat"
2014	Grey's Anatomy	Anne	Episode: "Throwing It All Away"
2014–2015	Modern Family	Angela	Episodes: "Spring-a-Ding-Fling", "Spring Break"
2015	Silicon Valley	Louise	Episode: "Two Days of the Condor"
2017	Chance	Lindsay	Recurring role (season 2)
2018	NCIS	Mrs. Keogh	Episode: "One Man's Trash"
2019	Ad Astra	Janice Collins	Film
2019	Unbelievable	Mrs. Dallow	Episode 4
2020	Love Is Love Is Love	Jackie	Segment: "Late Lunch"
2023	High School Musical: The Musical: The Series	Alyson Reed/Ms. Darbus	Recurring role (season 4)
