= Robert Curtis Brown =

American actor (born 1957)

- Born: April 27, 1957 (age 69); Bucks County, Pennsylvania, U.S.
- Education: Yale University (BA, MFA)
- Occupation: Actor
- Years active: 1982–present

Robert Curtis Brown (born Robert Nelson Brown, April 27, 1957) is an American television, film, and stage actor.

== Early life ==
Brown was born in Bucks County, Pennsylvania. He began acting in high school. He graduated from the Yale School of Drama in 1982.

== Career ==
Brown was in a production of the J. Hartley Manners play Peg O' My Heart in 1987 at Molloy College.

In 1988, Brown appeared as Octavius Caesar in a New York Shakespeare Festival production of Julius Caesar at The Public Theatre.

He played Peter Patrone in The Heidi Chronicles in 1990, winning the Drama-Logue award and being nominated for a Helen Hayes award for his role.

His performance in One of These Days at Matrix Theatre in Los Angeles in 1992 was well-received by T.H. McCulloh of the Los Angeles Times.

He performed in productions of Green Icebergs and Night and Her Stars at the South Coast Repertory in 1994.

In 1999, he played John Worthing in The Importance of Being Earnest. Michael Phillips of the Los Angeles Times wrote that Kaitlin Hopkins and Brown were the "aces" of the production.

Brown has appeared in many TV series throughout his career, with recurring roles in Herman's Head, Matlock, Beverly Hills, 90210, Suddenly Susan, Diagnosis Murder, Big Love, The Game, Shark, All My Children, The Young and the Restless, Perception, General Hospital, Barry, The Handmaid's Tale and Dear White People, among others. His longest-running television role was as Alec Kendall in Search for Tomorrow (1984–85).

Brown has also had a long film career. He played Mr. Evans in High School Musical 2, High School Musical 3: Senior Year and Sharpay's Fabulous Adventure, and has appeared in Trading Places, Legal Eagles, Stuart Saves His Family, Bean: The Movie, Bruce Almighty, Guess Who, Who's Your Caddy?, Halloween II, It's Complicated, Audrey, Undrafted, Step Sisters, Take Point, Ashfall, and more.

== Filmography ==
=== Film ===
Year	Title	Role	Notes
1980	Pilgrim, Farewell	Luke	
1983	Trading Places	Todd	Credited as Robert Curtis-Brown
1986	Legal Eagles	Roger	
1995	Stuart Saves His Family	Andy	Credited as Robert Curtis-Brown
1995	Angus	Alexander	
1997	Bean: The Movie	Dr. Frowning	Credited as Robert Curtis-Brown
2002	Catch Me If You Can	Front Desk Clerk	
2003	Bruce Almighty	Phil Sidleman	
2004	After the Sunset	Lakers FBI Agent	
2005	Guess Who	Dante	
2007	Drive-Thru	Bert McCandless	
2007	Spider-Man 3	Test Site Technician	
2007	Who's Your Caddy?	Frosty	
2008	High School Musical 3: Senior Year	Vance Evans	
2009	Halloween II	Kyle Van Der Klok	
2009	The Men Who Stare at Goats	General Brown	
2009	It's Complicated	Peter	
2014	Audrey	Stan	
2016	Undrafted	Brian Murray	
2018	Step Sisters	Dean Berman	
2018	Take Point	President McGregor	
2019	Ashfall	Ambassador Wilson	

=== Television ===
Year	Title	Role	Notes
1983	First Affair	Donald	Television film
1984–1985	Search for Tomorrow	Alex Kendall	Main role
1987	On the Edge	Dean	Television film
1990	Hyde in Hollywood	David	Television film
1992	Herman's Head	Sean	2 episodes (credited as Robert Curtis-Brown)
1992–1993	Matlock	Assistant D.A. Gilman; Larry Boone	4 episodes (credited as Robert Curtis-Brown)
1994	Inferno on US 17	Doug	Television film
1994–1996	Murder, She Wrote	Various	3 episodes (credited as Robert Curtis-Brown)
1995	Never Say Never: The Deidre Hall Story	Dr. Konialian	Television film
1995	The Christmas Box	George	Television film
1996	Dream On	Pilot	2 episodes (credited as Robert Curtis-Brown)
1996	Christmas Every Day	David Jackson	Television film
1996–2004	JAG	Various	2 episodes
1998	Beverly Hills, 90210	Robert	5 episodes
1998	The Pretender	Mr. Brewster	2 episodes
1998–2004	NYPD Blue	Various	2 episodes
1999	Suddenly Susan	Lester	2 episodes
1999	Will & Grace	Will Actor	Episode: "The Big Vent"
1999–2000	Family Law	Various	3 episodes
2000	Unauthorized: Brady Bunch - The Final Days	Robert Reed/Mike Brady	Television film
2000–2003	The Practice	Various	2 episodes
2001	Zenon: The Zequel	Mark Kar	Television film
2007	High School Musical 2	Vance Evans	Television film
2007	Supernatural	Father Gil	Episode: "Sin City"
2007	The Game	Chuck Reilly	2 episodes
2007–2008	Shark	Morgan Ride	2 episodes
2009	Citizen Jane	Vaughn	Television film
2010	Big Love	Stake President Kennedy	2 episodes
2010	All My Children	Paul Miller	5 episodes
2010	Look	Dan the Weatherman	2 episodes
2011	Sharpay's Fabulous Adventure	Mr. Evans	Direct-to-video
2011	The Young and the Restless	Judge	3 episodes (uncredited for 2 episodes)
2013	Switched at Birth	Ivan Ronan	5 episodes
2013	Mom	Edward	Pilot episode
2013	The Thundermans	Gerald Campbell	Episode: "Dinner Party"
2014	Intelligence	Senator Thomas Bradshaw	Episode: "The Rescue"
2014	Kickin' It	Mr. Peters	Episode: "The Amazing Krupnick"
2014–2015	Perception	Dr. Josiah Rosenthal	4 episodes
2015	Hawaii Five-0	Malcolm Leddy	Episode: "Luapo'i"
2016	Code Black	Senator Darren Stringer	Episode: "Blood Sport"
2016	Rizzoli & Isles	Noah Brenner	Episode: "For Richer or Poorer"
2017	General Hospital	Raymond Berlin	2 episodes
2017	Lethal Weapon	Walter Hancock	Episode: "Unnecessary Roughness"
2017	NCIS: Los Angeles	David Cole	Episode: "The Silo"
2017–2018	The Handmaid's Tale	Andrew Pryce	5 episodes
2018	Barry	Mike Hallman	2 episodes
2018	Lucifer	William Sterling	Episode: "Anything Pierce Can Do I Can Do Better"
2018	My Dinner with Hervé	Merv Griffin	Television film
2018–2019	Dear White People	William White	3 episodes
2019	I'm Sorry	Travis	Episode: "These Are My Fingers"
2019	The Orville	Chief Advisor Makkal	Episode: "All the World Is Birthday Cake"
2019	For the People	Judge Grant Fitzpatrick	Episode: "One Big Happy Family"
2019	Raven's Home	Coast Guard Captain Rob	Episode: "Lost at Chel-Sea"
2019	All Rise	Grant Lambert	Episode: "Long Day's Journey into ICE"
2020	The Rookie	Roger Nithercott	Episode: "Follow-Up Day"
2020	Ratched	Monsignor Sullivan	2 episodes
2020	The Right Stuff	Leo DeOrsey	1 episode (uncredited)
2020-–2021	Station 19	Paul Montgomery	Recurring
2021	Rutherford Falls	Beau	Episode: "Rutherford Inc."
2021	CSI: Vegas	Undersheriff Cade Wyatt	4 episodes
2021–present	The Ms. Pat Show	Paul Montgomery	4 episodes
2022	Grace and Frankie	Joe Dillard	Episode: "The Wire"
2022	9-1-1	Ronald	Episode: "Crash & Learn"
2023	Perry Mason	Judge	Episode 2.1

=== Video games ===
Year	Title	Role	Notes
2011	L.A. Noire	Dick McColl	
