= High School Musical 3: Senior Year (video game) =

2008 video game

- Developer: Griptonite Games
- Publisher: Disney Interactive Studios
- Platform: Nintendo DS
- Release: NA: October 21, 2008
- Genre: Music video game
- Modes: Single-player, Multiplayer

High School Musical 3: Senior Year is a 2008 Nintendo DS video game based on the film released in October 2008. There are all 29 songs all the 3 movies, and the player has to dance to them. The player can play as Troy, Gabriella, Sharpay, Ryan, Taylor or Chad, the main characters in the movie.

== Reception ==
IGN gave the game a score of seven out of ten and stated: "High School Musical 3: Senior Year makes a serious effort to be a fun and original game, and Griptonite Games deserves credit for that. It uses a unique control scheme that is fun for the most part. However the controls are tricky, making it hard to really excel at the title, and younger gamers may become frustrated if they can't progress. It feels like the developers held back and played it safe with the title".
