= Peter Barsocchini =

American screenwriter

- Born: San Francisco Bay Area, California, U.S.
- Education: University of California, Santa Cruz (BA)
- Occupations: Screenwriter, Producer, Author
- Years active: 1986–present

Peter Barsocchini is an American screenwriter, author, former journalist, and television producer best known for his scripts for the High School Musical series.

== Early life and education ==
Barsocchini was born in San Francisco, California. He attended Junípero Serra High School in San Mateo, California and graduated in 1970. He began his professional writing career while attending high school in the San Francisco Bay Area, writing more than 300 columns about popular music for The San Mateo Times. He also worked as a freelance reporter for the Associated Press and the San Francisco Examiner, and contributed reviews to the Associated Press and Rolling Stone. Barsocchini graduated from the University of California, Santa Cruz with a degree in creative writing.

== Career ==
As a young journalist, he spent weeks backstage at Fillmore West, covering Janis Joplin, Jimi Hendrix, Eric Clapton, The Grateful Dead, the Kinks, and Elton John. After graduating from college, Barsocchini was hired by the Merv Griffin Company as an interviewer for the Merv Griffin Show. In 1979, Barsocchini was named producer, a position he held for seven years. He won an Emmy Award twice as producer, the youngest talk-show producer ever to receive the award. He also was the ghostwriter for Griffin's autobiography which became a national bestseller, and was followed by a collection of interviews, "From Where I Sit", published in 1981. His first novel "Ghost" was published to laudatory reviews in the late 1980s with the screen rights being purchased by Paramount Pictures, beginning the transition to the film business. His screenplay Drop Zone was produced by Paramount and starred Wesley Snipes. He also wrote the novelization of Mission Impossible.

=== High School Musical ===
In 2004, Peter Barsocchini wrote the first draft of a script for the Disney Channel Original Movie, High School Musical for his preteen daughter Gabriella and many of her friends for whom he also named characters. He recalled knowing the film could be a success when the first draft was given a green light from Disney. The television film became a phenomenon that spawned billions in revenue and two sequels. The first sequel, High School Musical 2, shattered expectations and records becoming the highest rated cable broadcast in history with well over seventeen million viewers. High School Musical 3: Senior Year was released in theaters worldwide and had the biggest opening weekend gross for any movie musical in history. The writer has already been contacted to pen yet another book in the series that centres around characters introduced in the third movie. Unfortunately, there is no formal announcement on the production of the movie.

== Filmography (writer) ==
- Dance Fever (1986)
- Drop Zone (1994)
- Shadow-Ops (1995)
- High School Musical (2006)
- High School Musical 2 (2007)
- High School Musical 3: Senior Year (2008)
- Rock and Roll Forever (2008)
- The Passion (2016)
- Ping Pong Rabbit (2019)
- Vivo (2021)
- Journey to Bethlehem (2023)

== Filmography (producer) ==
- Shadow-Ops (1995)
- The Merv Griffin Show
