= High School Musical cast discography =

- Extended plays: 1
- Soundtrack albums: 3
- Live albums: 1
- Compilation albums: 5
- Singles: 12
- Remix albums: 2

The discography of the cast of the American film series High School Musical—primarily composed of Zac Efron, Vanessa Hudgens, Ashley Tisdale, Lucas Grabeel, Corbin Bleu and Monique Coleman—consists of three soundtrack albums, one live album, five compilation albums, two remix albums, one extended play and 12 singles. All albums and singles were released on Walt Disney Records. Collectively, the three soundtrack albums have sold 9.8 million copies in the United States, as of January 2016.

== Albums ==
=== Soundtrack albums ===
List of studio albums, with selected chart positions, sales figures and certifications
Title	Studio album details	Peak chart positions										Certifications	Sales
Title	Studio album details	US	AUS	AUT	CAN	FRA	GER	NZ	SPA	SWI	UK Comp.	Certifications	Sales
High School Musical	Released: January 10, 2006 (US); Label: Walt Disney; Formats: CD, digital download, LP	1	1	13	23	6	22	1	6	63	1	RIAA: 5× Platinum; ARIA: Platinum; BPI: 4× Platinum; BVMI: Platinum; IFPI AUT: Platinum; MC: Platinum; SNEP: Gold	WW: 7,000,000; US: 5,000,000; UK: 1,200,000
High School Musical 2	Released: August 14, 2007 (US); Label: Walt Disney; Formats: CD, digital download	1	4	2	1	12	5	3	2	6	1	RIAA: 3× Platinum; ARIA: Platinum; BPI: 2× Platinum; BVMI: Platinum; IFPI AUT: 2× Platinum; MC: 2× Platinum; IFPI SWI: Gold	WW: 6,000,000; US: 3,400,000
High School Musical 3: Senior Year	Released: October 21, 2008 (US); Label: Walt Disney; Formats: CD, digital download	2	4	1	2	6	3	1	1	6	1	RIAA: Platinum; ARIA: Platinum; BPI: Platinum; BVMI: Platinum; IFPI AUT: Gold; MC: 2× Platinum; IFPI SWI: Gold; RMNZ: 2× Platinum; SNEP: Platinum	US: 1,500,000
"—" denotes a recording that did not chart or was not released in that territory.

=== Live albums ===
List of live albums, with selected chart positions
Title	Album details	Peak chart positions		Certifications
Title	Album details	US	UK	Certifications
High School Musical: The Concert	Released: June 26, 2007 (US); Label: Walt Disney; Formats: CD, digital download	28	45	BPI: Silver

=== Compilation albums ===
List of compilation albums, with selected chart positions
Title	Album details	Peak chart positions	
Title	Album details	US	UK Comp.
Disney's Karaoke Series: High School Musical	Released: October 10, 2006 (US); Label: Walt Disney; Formats: CD, digital download	127	—
Disney's Karaoke Series: High School Musical 2	Released: September 18, 2007 (US); Label: Walt Disney; Formats: CD, digital download	98	—
Disney's Karaoke Series: High School Musical 3: Senior Year	Released: February 17, 2009 (US); Label: Walt Disney; Formats: CD, digital download	—	—
High School Musical: Hits Collection	Released: November 20, 2007 (UK); Label: Walt Disney; Formats: CD box set	—	—
High School Musical: The Collection	Released: October 26, 2009 (UK); Label: Walt Disney; Formats: CD box set	—	38
"—" denotes a recording that did not chart or was not released in that territory.

=== Remix albums ===
List of remix albums, with selected chart positions
Title	Album details	Peak chart positions		
Title	Album details	US	US Dance	UK Comp.
High School Musical Hits Remixed	Released: December 11, 2007 (US); Label: Walt Disney; Formats: CD, digital download	42	—	50
High School Musical 2: Non-Stop Dance Party	Released: December 11, 2007 (US); Label: Walt Disney; Formats: CD, digital download	68	1	—
"—" denotes a recording that did not chart or was not released in that territory.

== Extended plays ==
List of extended plays, with selected chart positions
Title	Details	Peak chart positions		
Title	Details	US	CAN	SPA
High School Musical: Be Mine	Released: January 29, 2008 (US); Label: Walt Disney; Formats: CD	65	12	1

== Singles ==
List of singles, with selected chart positions and certifications, showing year released and album name
Title	Year	Peak chart positions										Certifications	Album
Title	Year	US	US Pop	AUS	CAN	DEN	GER	IRL	NZ	SWI	UK	Certifications	Album
"Breaking Free" (Performed by Zac Efron, Drew Seeley & Vanessa Hudgens)	2006	4	6	13	—	—	46	17	4	—	9	RIAA: Platinum; BPI: Gold; BVMI: Gold	High School Musical
"Get'cha Head in the Game" (Performed by Seeley)	2006	23	23	—	—	—	—	—	—	—	125	RIAA: Gold	High School Musical
"We're All In This Together" (Performed by Seeley, Hudgens, Ashley Tisdale, Lucas Grabeel, Corbin Bleu & Monique Coleman)	2006	34	32	86	—	—	—	31	14	—	40	RIAA: Gold; BPI: Silver	High School Musical
"What Time Is It?" (Performed by Efron, Hudgens, Tisdale, Grabeel, Bleu & Coleman)	2007	6	6	20	66	—	—	10	—	—	20	RIAA: Gold	High School Musical 2
"I Don't Dance" (Performed by Grabeel & Bleu)	2007	70	50	93	81	—	—	—	—	—	57	BPI: Silver	High School Musical 2
"You Are the Music in Me" (Performed by Efron, Hudgens & Olesya Rulin)	2007	31	28	86	54	—	75	12	—	75	26	RIAA: Gold; BPI: Silver	High School Musical 2
"Gotta Go My Own Way" (Performed by Hudgens & Efron)	2007	34	31	—	67	—	67	36	—	59	40	RIAA: Platinum; BPI: Gold	High School Musical 2
"Everyday" (Performed by Efron & Hudgens)	2007	65	46	—	— (Note: "Everyday" did not enter the Billboard Canadian Hot 100, but peaked at number 64 on the Canadian Digital Song Sales chart.)	—	67	47	—	81	59	RIAA: Gold; BPI: Silver	High School Musical 2
"Bet on It" (Performed by Efron)	2007	46	35	—	93	—	—	—	—	—	65	RIAA: Gold; BPI: Silver	High School Musical 2
"Now or Never" (Performed by Efron, Hudgens, Bleu, Chris Warren Jr. & Ryne Sanborn)	2008	68	41	62	72	18	—	42	—	64	41	RIAA: Gold	High School Musical 3: Senior Year
"I Want It All" (Performed by Tisdale & Grabeel)	2008	— (Note: "I Want It All" did not enter the Billboard Hot 100, but peaked at number 13 on the Bubbling Under Hot 100 Singles chart.)	91	93	— (Note: "I Want It All" did not enter the Billboard Canadian Hot 100, but peaked at number 75 on the Canadian Digital Song Sales chart.)	—	—	—	—	—	87		High School Musical 3: Senior Year
"A Night to Remember" (Performed by Efron, Hudgens, Tisdale, Grabeel, Bleu, Coleman, Warren Jr., Rulin, Sanborn & Kaycee Stroh)	2008	— (Note: "A Night to Remember" did not enter the Billboard Hot 100, but peaked at number eight on the Bubbling Under Hot 100 Singles chart.)	—	96	—	—	—	—	—	—	94		High School Musical 3: Senior Year
"The Boys Are Back" (Performed by Efron & Bleu)	2008	— (Note: "The Boys Are Back" did not enter the Billboard Hot 100, but peaked at number one on the Bubbling Under Hot 100 Singles chart.)	—	72	— (Note: "The Boys Are Back" did not enter the Billboard Canadian Hot 100, but peaked at number 62 on the Canadian Digital Song Sales chart.)	—	—	—	—	—	101		High School Musical 3: Senior Year
"Right Here, Right Now" (Performed by Efron & Hudgens)	2008	— (Note: "Right Here, Right Now" did not enter the Billboard Hot 100, but peaked at number 19 on the Bubbling Under Hot 100 Singles chart.)	—	—	—	—	92	—	—	—	137		High School Musical 3: Senior Year
"—" denotes a recording that did not chart or was not released in that territory.

== Other charted songs ==
List of songs, with selected chart positions and certifications, showing year released and album name
Title	Year	Peak chart positions							Certifications	Album
Title	Year	US	US Pop	AUS	CAN Dig.	ITA	SWI	UK	Certifications	Album
"Start of Something New" (Performed by Efron, Seeley & Hudgens)	2006	28	30	—	—	33	—	90	RIAA: Gold; BPI: Silver	High School Musical
"What I've Been Looking For" (Performed by Tisdale & Grabeel)	2006	35	34	—	—	—	—	155	RIAA: Gold; BPI: Silver	High School Musical
"What I've Been Looking For (Reprise)" (Performed by Seeley & Hudgens)	2006	67	54	—	—	—	—	—		High School Musical
"Stick to the Status Quo" (Performed by Tisdale, Grabeel, Warren Jr., Stroh & Dutch Whitlock)	2006	43	37	—	—	50	—	74	RIAA: Gold	High School Musical
"When There Was Me and You" (Performed by Hudgens)	2006	72	56	—	—	—	—	184		High School Musical
"Bop to the Top" (Performed by Tisdale & Grabeel)	2006	62	46	—	—	—	—	137		High School Musical
"Work This Out" (Performed by Efron, Hudgens, Bleu, Coleman, Warren Jr., Sanborn & Stroh)	2007	— (Note: "Work This Out" did not enter the Billboard Hot 100, but peaked at number 10 on the Bubbling Under Hot 100 Singles chart.)	73	—	—	—	—	78		High School Musical 2
"Fabulous" (Performed by Tisdale & Grabeel)	2007	76	51	64	63	—	—	64	RIAA: Gold	High School Musical 2
"You Are the Music in Me (Reprise)" (Performed by Tisdale & Efron)	2007	—	—	—	—	—	—	89		High School Musical 2
"All for One" (Performed by Efron, Hudgens, Tisdale, Grabeel, Bleu & Coleman)	2007	92	58	—	62	—	—	87		High School Musical 2
"Can I Have This Dance" (Performed by Efron & Hudgens)	2008	98	—	84	—	—	80	81	RIAA: Platinum; BPI: Silver	High School Musical 3: Senior Year
"Just Wanna Be with You" (Performed by Grabeel, Rulin, Efron & Hudgens)	2008	—	—	—	—	—	—	153		High School Musical 3: Senior Year
"Scream" (Performed by Efron)	2008	— (Note: "Scream" did not enter the Billboard Hot 100, but peaked at number 14 on the Bubbling Under Hot 100 Singles chart.)	—	—	—	—	—	126		High School Musical 3: Senior Year
"High School Musical" (Performed by Efron, Hudgens, Tisdale, Grabeel, Bleu & Coleman)	2008	—	—	—	—	—	—	105		High School Musical 3: Senior Year
"—" denotes a recording that did not chart or was not released in that territory.
