= High School Musical: The Musical: The Series: The Soundtrack: The Final Season =

TV series soundtrack album

Soundtrack album by Cast of High School Musical: The Musical: The Series
- Released: August 9, 2023
- Recorded: September–December 2022
- Genre: Pop; teen pop; musical theatre
- Label: Walt Disney

High School Musical chronology
High School Musical: The Musical: The Series: The Soundtrack: Season 3 (2022)	High School Musical: The Musical: The Series: The Soundtrack: The Final Season (2023)

Singles from High School Musical: The Musical: The Series: The Soundtrack: The Final Season
- 1. "High School Reunion" Released: July 25, 2023

High School Musical: The Musical: The Series: The Soundtrack: The Final Season is the soundtrack album for the fourth and final season of the streaming television series High School Musical: The Musical: The Series. The soundtrack for the season contains original songs, as well as covers of songs from the 2008 film High School Musical 3: Senior Year. The album was released on August 10, 2023, one day after the final season premiered in its entirety on Disney+.

== Background ==
In May 2022, two months before the Disney+ series High School Musical: The Musical: The Series debuted its third season on the platform, the series was renewed for a fourth season. In September, at that year's D23 Expo, it was confirmed that the musical would revolve around a stage adaptation of the 2008 film High School Musical 3: Senior Year.

== Composition ==
The soundtrack features original songs as well as new recordings of songs from the 2008 film High School Musical 3: Senior Year.

== Singles ==
Prior to the release of the season on Disney+, a song was released as a preview on July 25, 2023, titled "High School Reunion" and performed by Corbin Bleu, Monique Coleman, Lucas Grabeel, Kaycee Stroh, Sofia Wylie and Matthew Sato.

== Release and promotion ==
The soundtrack was released digitally on August 9, 2023, with preorders beginning on August 4. However, no physical release has been announced yet.

== Track listing ==
High School Musical: The Musical: The Series: The Soundtrack: Season 4 track listing
No.	Title	Writer(s)	Performer(s)	Length
1.	"High School Musical (Main Theme)"	Gabriel Mann	None	0:37
2.	"High School Reunion"	Chantry Johnson; Michelle Zarlenga; Mitch Allan	Corbin Bleu; Monique Coleman; Lucas Grabeel; Kaycee Stroh; Sofia Wylie; Matthew Sato	2:31
3.	"High School Musical"	Matthew Gerrard; Robbie Nevil	Kylie Cantrall	1:16
4.	"Puppy Love (Theme Song Version)"	Cozi Zuehlsdorff; Matthew Tishler	Zuehlsdorff	0:51
5.	"Maybe This Time"	Brandon C. Rogers; Jason Mater; William Behlendorf	Wylie; Joshua Bassett	2:33
6.	"Now or Never (Auditions)"	Gerrard; Nevil	Cast of High School Musical: The Musical: The Series	2:25
7.	"Puppy Love"	Zuehlsdorff; Tishler	Bassett	1:27
8.	"Can I Have This Dance?"	Adam Anders; Nikki Hassman	Bassett; Wylie	4:03
9.	"Nightmares Come to Life"	Tova Litvin; Doug Rockwell	Cast of High School Musical: The Musical: The Series	2:41
10.	"Call It What You Want"	Zuehlsdorff; Tishler	Julia Lester; Saylor Bell Curda	2:24
11.	"Speak Out (Acoustic)"	Litvin; Rockwell; Bassett	Bassett; Matt Cornett	2:54
12.	"Jump"	Laura Karpman; Raphael Saadiq; Taura Stinson	Dara Reneé	4:24
13.	"Over Again"	Jaheem King Toombs; Matthew Edward Martinez	Frankie A. Rodriguez; Joe Serafini	3:10
14.	"Dreams Don't Die"	Jordan Powers; Josh Cumbee	Liamani Segura	2:54
15.	"Now or Never"	Gerrard; Nevil	Cast of High School Musical: The Musical: The Series	1:52
16.	"I Want It All"	Gerrard; Nevil	Reneé; Rodriguez; Cantrall	4:36
17.	"A Night to Remember"	Gerrard; Nevil	Cast of High School Musical: The Musical: The Series	3:58
18.	"The Boys Are Back"	Gerrard; Nevil	Bassett; Adrian Lyles	3:48
19.	"Walk Away"	Jamie Houston	Wylie	3:39
20.	"Scream"	Houston	Bassett	3:51
21.	"Right Here, Right Now"	Houston	Bassett; Wylie	1:25
22.	"High School Musical (Finale)"	Gerrard; Nevil	Cast of High School Musical: The Musical: The Series	3:52
23.	"Love You Forever"	Zuehlsdorff; Tishler	Cast of High School Musical: The Musical: The Series	3:06
24.	"Born to Be Brave"	Litvin; Rockwell	Cast of High School Musical: The Musical: The Series	2:18
25.	"Last Chance"	Kevin Quinn; Randy Petersen	Lester; Rodriguez; Cast of High School Musical: The Musical: The Series	0:58
26.	"We're All in This Together"	Gerrard; Nevil	Cast of High School Musical: The Musical: The Series	2:49
27.	"Just Wanna Be With You"	Andy Dodd; Adam Watts	Bassett; Wylie	2:34
28.	"Speak Out"	Litvin; Rockwell; Bassett	Bassett; Cornett	2:54
Total length:				1:16:00
