= High School Musical 3: Senior Year Dance =

2008 video game

- Developer: Page 44 Studios
- Publisher: Disney Interactive Studios
- Series: High School Musical
- Platforms: Microsoft Windows, PlayStation 2, Wii, Xbox 360
- Release: List: Wii; NA: October 21, 2008; EU: November 14, 2008; AU: December 10, 2008 PlayStation 2; NA: October 28, 2008; EU: November 7, 2008; AU: December 10, 2008 Xbox 360; NA: October 28, 2008; EU: November 7, 2008; AU: November 23, 2008 PC; NA: October 31, 2008
- Genres: Music video game, Adventure, Rhythm
- Modes: Single-player, Multiplayer

High School Musical 3: Senior Year Dance is a rhythm game based on the film High School Musical 3: Senior Year. The game was released on October 21, 2008 for the Wii and for PlayStation 2, Xbox 360 and Windows later that month.

== Gameplay ==
- Dancing to favorite High School Musical songs from all three films.
- Players can play as familiar characters including Troy, Gabriella, Sharpay, Ryan, Chad, Taylor, Kelsi, and Zeke or create and customize a unique Wildcat.
- Engaging in competitive multiplayer dance-offs for a fun dance party experience.
- Earning points by learning dance moves from "High School Musical" characters to unlock songs, clothing and characters.
- Interaction with scenes by activating special effects.
- Xbox Live features, including in-game Achievements and ESPN Integration (Xbox 360 version only).

== Songs ==
=== High School Musical ===
#	Title
1	"Start of Something New"
2	"Get'cha Head in the Game"
3	"What I've Been Looking For"
4	"What I've Been Looking For (Reprise)"
5	"Stick to the Status Quo"
6	"When There Was Me and You"
7	"Bop to the Top"
8	"Breaking Free"
9	"We're All in This Together"

=== High School Musical 2 ===
#	Title
1	"What Time Is It?"
2	"Fabulous"*
3	"Work This Out"
4	"You Are the Music in Me"
5	"I Don't Dance"
6	"You Are the Music in Me (Sharpay Version)"
7	"Gotta Go My Own Way"
8	"Bet on It"
9	"Everyday"
10	"All for One"

=== High School Musical 3: Senior Year ===
#	Title
1	"Now or Never"
2	"Right Here, Right Now"
3	"I Want It All"
4	"Can I Have This Dance"
5	"A Night to Remember"
6	"Just Wanna Be with You"
7	"The Boys Are Back"
8	"Walk Away"
9	"Scream"
10	"High School Musical"

== Reception ==
Reception

Aggregate scores
Aggregator	Score			
Aggregator	PC	PS2	Wii	Xbox 360
GameRankings	50%	65%	65%	46.67%
Metacritic	48/100	65/100	60/100	55/100

Review scores
Publication	Score			
Publication	PC	PS2	Wii	Xbox 360
IGN	5/10	6.5/10	6.5/10	5/10
Official Xbox Magazine (US)				6/10

Reviews of the game range from mixed to negative, as both GameRankings and Metacritic gave it a score of 65% and 60/100 for the Wii version, 65% and 65/100 for the PlayStation 2 version, 46.67% and 55/100 for the Xbox 360 version, and 50% and 48/100 for the PC version. Variety gave the Wii version a mixed review and said: "Target kiddie audience will enjoy mixing-and-matching characters in ways never seen onscreen, as well as creating their own East High Wildcat, but will quickly get frustrated with the game's core "dancing" mechanic that's really just flailing with the Wii's wireless controller".
