= High School Musical 2: Non-Stop Dance Party =

Remix album by High School Musical 2 Cast
- Released: December 24, 2007
- Length: 45:48
- Label: Walt Disney

High School Musical chronology
High School Musical Hits Remixed (2007)	High School Musical 2: Non-Stop Dance Party (2007)	High School Musical 3: Senior Year (2008)

High School Musical 2: Non-Stop Dance Party is a remixed album of the soundtrack, High School Musical 2. It was released first in the UK and Southeast Asia on December 24, 2007. The entire album was available to listen to on Disney XD UK from December 21 to December 23, a day before the album was released. All of the tracks were remixed by Jason Nevins. Music videos have been released on Disney Channel for "Bet on It" and "Fabulous". Although many fans have stated that the back cover's track listing is incorrect, this is not true. In fact, it only states songs included on the album. Thus, there is no real track listing to be found.

== Track listing ==
No.	Title	Recording artist(s)	Length
1.	"What Time Is It?"	Zac Efron, Vanessa Hudgens, Ashley Tisdale, Lucas Grabeel, Corbin Bleu, Monique Coleman	3:56
2.	"I Don't Dance"	Lucas Grabeel, Corbin Bleu	3:58
3.	"Gotta Go My Own Way"	Zac Efron, Vanessa Hudgens	2:56
4.	"You Are the Music in Me"	Zac Efron, Vanessa Hudgens, Olesya Rulin	3:09
5.	"Work This Out"	Zac Efron, Vanessa Hudgens, Corbin Bleu, Monique Coleman, Chris Warren Jr., Ryne Sanborn, Olesya Rulin, Kaycee Stroh	2:58
6.	"Everyday"	Zac Efron, Vanessa Hudgens	4:48
7.	"Fabulous"	Ashley Tisdale, Lucas Grabeel	3:27
8.	"Bet on It"	Zac Efron	3:51
9.	"All for One"	Zac Efron, Vanessa Hudgens, Ashley Tisdale, Lucas Grabeel, Corbin Bleu, Monique Coleman	4:36
10.	"You Are the Music in Me" (Sharpay Version)	Zac Efron, Ashley Tisdale	3:31
11.	"Humuhumunukunukuapua'a"	Ashley Tisdale, Lucas Grabeel	3:11
12.	"The Megamix"	High School Musical 2 cast	5:27

Note: All songs remixed by Jason Nevins

=== iTunes bonus video Version ===
Bonus tracks

No.	Title	Length
12.	"High School Musical 2 – The Megamix (Full Version)"	5:27
13.	"High School Musical 2 Around the World Video Mix"	6:21

Bonus features

14. Slideshow
15. Printable Party Invitations

== Chart performance ==
The album debuted at number 68 on the U.S. Billboard 200 chart, selling about 22,000 copies in its first week and sold 25,000 copies in Brazil.

=== Weekly charts ===
Chart (2008)	Peak position
US Billboard 200	52
US Top Dance Albums (Billboard)	1

=== Year-end charts ===
Chart (2008)	Position
US Top Dance/Electronic Albums (Billboard)	5
