= Sharpay's Fabulous Adventure (soundtrack) =

Soundtrack album by Various Artists
- Released: April 19, 2011
- Recorded: 2010
- Genre: Pop
- Length: 24:25
- Label: Walt Disney

High School Musical chronology
High School Musical 3: Senior Year (2008)	Sharpay's Fabulous Adventure (2011)	High School Musical: The Musical: The Series: The Soundtrack (2020)

Sharpay's Fabulous Adventure is the soundtrack album from the movie of the same name. It was released by Walt Disney Records on April 19, 2011 in the United States.

== Album information ==
Sharpay's Fabulous Adventure is a spin-off of the High School Musical series. As the lead star, Ashley Tisdale was required to record several songs for the film as confirmed by herself on May 22, 2010, which were later packaged together into a soundtrack album. Former High School Musical star Lucas Grabeel recorded a cover version of Justin Bieber's hit "Baby" for the film.

== Singles ==
The song "Gonna Shine" became the first single of the album and had a World Premiere on Radio Disney on March 25, 2011.

== Track listing ==
No.	Title	Writer(s)	Recording artist(s)	Length
1.	"Gonna Shine"	Randy Petersen & Kevin Quinn	Ashley Tisdale	3:11
2.	"My Boi and Me"	Matthew Tishler & Amy Powers	Ashley Tisdale	2:26
3.	"My Girl and Me"	Matthew Tishler & Amy Powers	Shawn Molko, the singing voice of Roger Elliston, played by Bradley Steven Perry	2:15
4.	"New York's Best Kept Secret"	David Lawrence & Faye Greenberg	Ashley Tisdale	3:28
5.	"The Rest of My Life"	Matthew Tishler & Amy Powers	Ashley Tisdale	3:01
6.	"Baby"	Justin Bieber, The Dream & Christopher Stewart	Lucas Grabeel	3:34
7.	"Walking on Sunshine"	Kimberly Rew	Aly & AJ	3:54
8.	"Fabulous (Remix)"	David Lawrence & Faye Greenberg	Ashley Tisdale and Lucas Grabeel	3:07

Non-US bonus tracks
No.	Title	Recording artist(s)	Length
9.	"I Want It All"	Ashley Tisdale and Lucas Grabeel	4:39
10.	"Fabulous"	Ashley Tisdale and Lucas Grabeel	3:02
11.	"You Are the Music in Me"	Ashley Tisdale and Zac Efron	2:29
12.	"Humuhumunukunukuapua'a"	Ashley Tisdale and Lucas Grabeel	3:11
13.	"Bop to the Top"	Ashley Tisdale and Lucas Grabeel	1:48

- Note: Tracks seven and eight are not available in digital stores.
- The deluxe version is exclusive to Walmart.com, and was released on September 13, 2011.
