= 2009 Teen Choice Awards =

American awards ceremony held in California

- Date: August 9, 2009
- Location: Gibson Amphitheatre, Universal City, California
- Hosted by: Jonas Brothers

Television/radio coverage
- Network: Fox

The 2009 Teen Choice Awards ceremony was held on August 9, 2009, at Gibson Amphitheatre in Universal City, California. The event was hosted by the Jonas Brothers, Nick, Kevin and Joe, who also performed. Twilight took home most awards with the total of 10 wins out of 11 nominations, including Robert Pattinson winning Choice Male Hottie. Miley Cyrus presented Britney Spears with the Ultimate Choice Award.

== Performers ==
- Jonas Brothers – "Much Better" / "World War III"
- Sean Kingston – "Fire Burning"
- The Black Eyed Peas – "I Gotta Feeling"
- Miley Cyrus – "Party in the U.S.A."

== Presenters ==
- George Lopez • Presented Choice Drama TV Actor and Choice Drama TV Actress
- Jennette McCurdy, Nathan Kress, Jerry Trainor and Miranda Cosgrove • Presented Choice Twit
- Jordin Sparks • Presented Dare the Jonas Brothers
- Corbin Bleu and Ashley Tisdale • Presented Choice Comedy Movie Actor
- Lea Michele, Cory Monteith, Jenna Ushkowitz, Chris Colfer, Amber Riley, and Kevin McHale • Introduced Sean Kingston
- Emma Roberts and Hayden Panettiere • Presented Choice Breakout Movie Actor and Choice Breakout Movie Actress
- Keke Palmer and Emily Osment • Presented Choice Breakout TV Actor and Other Winners
- Kristen Bell and Ed Westwick • Presented Choice Summer Movie: Drama
- Shailene Woodley and Daren Kagasoff • Introduced Miley Cyrus
- Zach Gilford and Alexis Bledel • Presented Choice Summer TV Star: Female
- Dane Cook • Presented Choice Male Hottie and Choice Female Hottie
- Vanessa Hudgens, Gaelan Connell, and Aly Michalka • Introduced The Black Eyed Peas
- Marlon Wayans and Jordana Brewster • Presented Choice Action Movie Actor
- Miley Cyrus • Presented Ultimate Choice
- Jennifer Morrison and Honor Society • Presented Choice "Fab-u-lous"
- Josh Duhamel • Introduced the cast of "Twilight"
- Kim Kardashian and Shawn Johnson • Presented awards to the Jonas Brothers

== Winners and nominees ==
Winners are listed first and highlighted in bold text.

=== Movies ===
Choice Movie: Action	Choice Movie Actor: Action
**X-Men Origins: Wolverine**; Fast & Furious; Star Trek; Taken; Terminator Salvation	**Hugh Jackman – X-Men Origins: Wolverine**; Christian Bale – Terminator Salvation; Dwayne Johnson – Race to Witch Mountain; Shia LaBeouf – Eagle Eye; Paul Walker – Fast & Furious
Choice Movie Actress: Action	Choice Movie: Drama
**Jordana Brewster – Fast & Furious**; Malin Åkerman – Watchmen; Bryce Dallas Howard – Terminator Salvation; Mila Kunis – Max Payne; Zoe Saldaña – Star Trek	**Twilight**; Angels & Demons; The Curious Case of Benjamin Button; Obsessed; Slumdog Millionaire
Choice Movie Actor: Drama	Choice Movie Actress: Drama
**Robert Pattinson – Twilight**; Hugh Jackman – Australia; Dev Patel – Slumdog Millionaire; Brad Pitt – The Curious Case of Benjamin Button; Channing Tatum – Fighting	**Kristen Stewart – Twilight**; Angelina Jolie – Changeling; Nicole Kidman – Australia; Beyoncé Knowles – Obsessed; Freida Pinto – Slumdog Millionaire
Choice Movie: Romance	Choice Movie: Bromantic Comedy
**Twilight**; Australia; Confessions of a Shopaholic; He's Just Not That Into You; The Sisterhood of the Traveling Pants 2	**Marley & Me**; I Love You, Man; Pineapple Express; Role Models; Tropic Thunder
Choice Movie: Comedy	Choice Movie Actor: Comedy
**Night at the Museum: Battle of the Smithsonian**; The Hangover; Land of the Lost; Paul Blart: Mall Cop; Yes Man	**Zac Efron – 17 Again**; Jim Carrey – Yes Man; Will Ferrell – Land of the Lost; Seth Rogen – Observe and Report and Pineapple Express; Ben Stiller – Night at the Museum: Battle of the Smithsonian and Tropic Thunder
Choice Movie Actress: Comedy	Choice Movie: Horror/Thriller
**Anne Hathaway – Bride Wars**; Amy Adams – Night at the Museum: Battle of the Smithsonian; Jennifer Aniston – Marley & Me and He's Just Not That Into You; Isla Fisher – Confessions of a Shopaholic; Kate Hudson – Bride Wars	**Friday the 13th**; Drag Me to Hell; The Haunting of Molly Hartley; Quarantine; The Uninvited
Choice Movie: Music/Dance	Choice Movie Actor: Music/Dance
**High School Musical 3: Senior Year**; Hannah Montana: The Movie; Jonas Brothers: The 3D Concert Experience; Nick & Norah's Infinite Playlist; Steppin: The Movie	**Zac Efron – High School Musical 3: Senior Year**; Corbin Bleu – High School Musical 3: Senior Year; Michael Cera – Nick & Norah's Infinite Playlist; Jason Earles – Hannah Montana: The Movie; Lucas Till – Hannah Montana: The Movie
Choice Movie Actress: Music/Dance	Choice Movie: Villain
**Miley Cyrus – Hannah Montana: The Movie**; Kat Dennings – Nick & Norah's Infinite Playlist; Vanessa Hudgens – High School Musical 3: Senior Year; Amy Smart – Love N' Dancing; Ashley Tisdale – High School Musical 3: Senior Year	**Cam Gigandet – Twilight**; Hank Azaria – Night at the Museum: Battle of the Smithsonian; Eric Bana – Star Trek; Ken Jeong – The Hangover; Liev Schreiber – X-Men Origins: Wolverine
Choice Movie: Male Fresh Face	Choice Movie: Female Fresh Face
**Taylor Lautner – Twilight**; Taylor Kitsch – X-Men Origins: Wolverine; Dev Patel – Slumdog Millionaire; Chris Pine – Star Trek; Sam Worthington – Terminator Salvation	**Ashley Greene – Twilight**; Lynn Collins – X-Men Origins: Wolverine; Emily Osment – Hannah Montana: The Movie; Freida Pinto – Slumdog Millionaire; Nikki Reed – Twilight
Choice Movie: Liplock	Choice Movie: Hissy Fit
**Robert Pattinson and Kristen Stewart – Twilight**; Miley Cyrus and Lucas Till – Hannah Montana: The Movie; Zac Efron and Vanessa Hudgens – High School Musical 3: Senior Year; Dev Patel and Freida Pinto – Slumdog Millionaire; Owen Wilson and Marley – Marley & Me	**Miley Cyrus – Hannah Montana: The Movie**; Jim Carrey – Yes Man; Robert Downey Jr. – Tropic Thunder; Kate Hudson – Bride Wars; Hugh Jackman – X-Men Origins: Wolverine
Choice Movie: Rumble	Choice Movie: Rockstar Moment
**Robert Pattinson vs. Cam Gigandet – Twilight**; Anne Hathaway vs. Kate Hudson – Bride Wars; Hugh Jackman and Liev Schreiber vs. Ryan Reynolds – X-Men Origins: Wolverine; Beyoncé Knowles vs. Ali Larter – Obsessed; Chris Pine vs. Zachary Quinto – Star Trek	**Zac Efron – 17 Again**; Jim Carrey – Yes Man; Bradley Cooper, Zach Galifianakis, Ed Helms and Mike Tyson – The Hangover; Anne Hathaway – Bride Wars; Paul Rudd and Jason Segel – I Love You, Man
Choice Summer Movie: Action	Choice Summer Movie: Drama
**Harry Potter and the Half-Blood Prince**; Star Trek; Terminator Salvation; Transformers: Revenge of the Fallen; X-Men Origins: Wolverine	**My Sister's Keeper**; Angels & Demons; Orphan; Public Enemies; The Taking of Pelham 123
Choice Summer Movie: Comedy	Choice Summer Movie: Romance
**Up**; Brüno; Funny People; The Hangover; Year One	**The Proposal**; Away We Go; I Love You, Beth Cooper; My Life in Ruins; The Ugly Truth
Choice Summer Movie Star: Male	Choice Summer Movie Star: Female
**Shia LaBeouf – Transformers: Revenge of the Fallen**; Sacha Baron Cohen – Brüno; Bradley Cooper – The Hangover; Johnny Depp – Public Enemies; Ryan Reynolds – The Proposal; Adam Sandler – Funny People	**Megan Fox – Transformers: Revenge of the Fallen**; Sandra Bullock – The Proposal; Cameron Diaz – My Sister's Keeper; Katherine Heigl – The Ugly Truth; Hayden Panettiere – I Love You, Beth Cooper; Ashley Tisdale – Aliens in the Attic

=== Television ===
Choice TV Show: Drama	Choice TV Actor: Drama
**Gossip Girl**; Grey's Anatomy; House; 90210; The Secret Life of the American Teenager	**Chace Crawford – Gossip Girl**; Penn Badgley – Gossip Girl; Ken Baumann – The Secret Life of the American Teenager; Joshua Jackson – Fringe; Dustin Milligan – 90210
Choice TV Actress: Drama	Choice TV Show: Action
**Leighton Meester – Gossip Girl**; Minka Kelly – Friday Night Lights; Blake Lively – Gossip Girl; Olivia Wilde – House; Shailene Woodley – The Secret Life of the American Teenager	**Heroes**; Lost; Smallville; Terminator: The Sarah Connor Chronicles; 24
Choice TV Actor: Action	Choice TV Actress: Action
**Tom Welling – Smallville**; Thomas Dekker – Terminator: The Sarah Connor Chronicles; Matthew Fox – Lost; Josh Holloway – Lost; Milo Ventimiglia – Heroes	**Hayden Panettiere – Heroes**; Kristen Bell – Heroes; Summer Glau – Terminator: The Sarah Connor Chronicles; Kristin Kreuk – Smallville; Ali Larter – Heroes
Choice TV Show: Comedy	Choice TV Actor: Comedy
**Hannah Montana**; How I Met Your Mother; iCarly; The Office; Ugly Betty	**Jonas Brothers – Jonas**; Steve Carell – The Office; Neil Patrick Harris – How I Met Your Mother; Charlie Sheen – Two and a Half Men; Jerry Trainor – iCarly
Choice TV Actress: Comedy	Choice TV Show: Animated
**Miley Cyrus – Hannah Montana**; Miranda Cosgrove – iCarly; America Ferrera – Ugly Betty; Jenna Fischer – The Office; Eva Longoria – Desperate Housewives	**SpongeBob SquarePants**; American Dad!; Family Guy; The Simpsons; South Park
Choice TV Show: Reality	Choice TV Show: Reality Competition
**The Hills**; Jon & Kate Plus 8; Kathy Griffin: My Life on the D-List; Keeping Up with the Kardashians; Rob Dyrdek's Fantasy Factory	**American Idol**; America's Best Dance Crew; America's Next Top Model; The Bachelor; Dancing with the Stars
Choice TV: Personality	Choice TV: Villain
**Ryan Seacrest – American Idol and E! News**; Tyra Banks – America's Next Top Model; Simon Cowell – American Idol; Lil Mama – America's Best Dance Crew; Mario Lopez – America's Best Dance Crew	**Ed Westwick – Gossip Girl**; Spencer Pratt – The Hills; Zachary Quinto – Heroes; Michael Rosenbaum – Smallville; Vanessa Williams – Ugly Betty
Choice TV: Breakout Show	Choice TV: Male Breakout Star
**Jonas**; Fringe; Glee; 90210; The Secret Life of the American Teenager	**Frankie Jonas – Jonas**; Daren Kagasoff – The Secret Life of the American Teenager; Danny McBride – Eastbound & Down; Cory Monteith – Glee; Tristan Wilds – 90210
Choice TV: Female Breakout Star	Choice TV: Male Reality/Variety Star
**Demi Lovato – Sonny with a Chance**; AnnaLynne McCord – 90210; Lea Michele – Glee; Chelsea Staub – Jonas; Anna Torv – Fringe	**Adam Lambert – American Idol**; Kris Allen – American Idol; Rob Dyrdek – Rob Dyrdek's Fantasy Factory; Brody Jenner – Bromance; Ryan Sheckler – Life of Ryan
Choice TV: Female Reality/Variety Star	Choice TV: Sidekick
**Lauren Conrad – The Hills**; Teyona Anderson – America's Next Top Model; Paris Hilton – Paris Hilton's My New BFF; Shawn Johnson – Dancing with the Stars; Kim Kardashian – Keeping Up with the Kardashians	**Emily Osment – Hannah Montana**; Jake T. Austin – Wizards of Waverly Place; Allison Mack – Smallville; Jennette McCurdy – iCarly; Michael Urie – Ugly Betty
Choice TV: Parental Unit	Choice TV Show: Late Night
**Billy Ray Cyrus – Hannah Montana**; Mark Derwin and Molly Ringwald – The Secret Life of the American Teenager; Rob Estes and Lori Loughlin – 90210; Tony Plana – Ugly Betty; Matthew Settle – Gossip Girl	**Chelsea Lately**; Jimmy Kimmel Live; Late Night with Jimmy Fallon; Late Show with David Letterman; The Tonight Show with Conan O'Brien
Choice TV: Fab-u-lous	Choice Summer TV Show
**Miss J – America's Next Top Model**; Perez Hilton; Carson Kressley – How to Look Good Naked; Rex Lee – Entourage; Michael Urie – Ugly Betty	**Princess Protection Program**; Make It or Break It; Paris Hilton's My New BFF; The Secret Life of the American Teenager; So You Think You Can Dance
Choice Summer TV Star: Male	Choice Summer TV Star: Female
**Daren Kagasoff – The Secret Life of the American Teenager**; Ken Baumann – The Secret Life of the American Teenager; Adrian Grenier – Entourage; George Lopez – Mr. Troop Mom; Stephen Moyer – True Blood	**Selena Gomez – Princess Protection Program and Wizards of Waverly Place**; Paris Hilton – Paris Hilton's My New BFF; Demi Lovato – Princess Protection Program; Anna Paquin – True Blood; Shailene Woodley – The Secret Life of the American Teenager

=== Music ===
Choice Music: Male Artist	Choice Music: Female Artist
**Jason Mraz**; Lil Wayne; Ne-Yo; Soulja Boy; Kanye West	**Taylor Swift**; Miley Cyrus; Lady Gaga; Katy Perry; Britney Spears
Choice Music: R&B Artist	Choice Music: Rap Artist
**Beyoncé**; Jamie Foxx; Jennifer Hudson; Ne-Yo; T-Pain	**Kanye West**; Bow Wow; Lil Wayne; Soulja Boy; T.I.
Choice Music: Rock Group	Choice Music: Single
**Paramore**; The All-American Rejects; Green Day; Kings of Leon; Linkin Park	**"The Climb" – Miley Cyrus**; "Circus" – Britney Spears; "Hot n Cold" – Katy Perry; "My Life Would Suck Without You" – Kelly Clarkson; "Poker Face" – Lady Gaga
Choice Music: R&B Track	Choice Music: Rap/Hip-Hop Track
**"Single Ladies (Put a Ring on It)" – Beyoncé**; "If This Isn't Love" – Jennifer Hudson; "Kiss Me thru the Phone" – Soulja Boy featuring Sammie; "Love Lockdown" – Kanye West; "Mad" – Ne-Yo	**"Boom Boom Pow" – The Black Eyed Peas**; "Heartless" – Kanye West; "I Know You Want Me (Calle Ocho)" – Pitbull; "I Love College" – Asher Roth; "Right Round" – Flo Rida featuring Ke$ha
Choice Music: Rock Track	Choice Music: Love Song
**"Decode" – Paramore**; "Gives You Hell" – The All-American Rejects; "Know Your Enemy" – Green Day; "Sink into Me" – Taking Back Sunday; "You Found Me" – The Fray	**"Crush" – David Archuleta**; "Halo" – Beyoncé; "How Do You Sleep?" – Jesse McCartney; "Lovebug" – Jonas Brothers; "Love Story" – Taylor Swift
Choice Music: Breakout Artist	Choice Music: Hook Up
**David Archuleta**; David Cook; Kid Cudi; Lady Gaga; Asher Roth	**"Just Dance" – Lady Gaga featuring Colby O'Donis**; "Kiss Me thru the Phone" – Soulja Boy featuring Sammie; "Live Your Life" – T.I. featuring Rihanna; "Love Sex Magic" – Ciara featuring Justin Timberlake; "Lucky" – Jason Mraz and Colbie Caillat
Choice Music Album: Male	Choice Music Album: Female
**We Sing, We Dance, We Steal Things – Jason Mraz**; David Cook – David Cook; 808s and Heartbreak – Kanye West; Relapse – Eminem; Tha Carter III – Lil Wayne	**Fearless – Taylor Swift**; Carnival Ride – Carrie Underwood; The Fame – Lady Gaga; I Am... Sasha Fierce – Beyoncé; One of the Boys – Katy Perry
Choice Music Album: Group	Choice Music: Soundtrack
**Lines, Vines and Trying Times – Jonas Brothers**; The E.N.D. – The Black Eyed Peas; Only by the Night – Kings of Leon; 21st Century Breakdown – Green Day; When the World Comes Down – The All-American Rejects	**Twilight**; Gossip Girl; Hannah Montana: The Movie; High School Musical 3: Senior Year; Jonas Brothers: 3D Concert Experience
Choice Music: Tour	Choice Summer Song
**Demi Lovato and David Archuleta**; American Idol; Jonas Brothers; Britney Spears; Taylor Swift	**"Before the Storm" – Jonas Brothers featuring Miley Cyrus**; "Fire Burning" – Sean Kingston; "I Gotta Feeling" – The Black Eyed Peas; "I Know You Want Me (Calle Ocho)" – Pitbull; "Knock You Down" – Keri Hilson featuring Kanye West and Ne-Yo

=== Miscellaneous ===
Choice Male Hottie	Choice Female Hottie
**Robert Pattinson**; Chace Crawford; Zac Efron; Jonas Brothers; Taylor Kitsch	**Megan Fox**; Miley Cyrus; Vanessa Hudgens; Beyoncé Knowles; Blake Lively
Choice Comedian	Choice Celebrity Activist
**George Lopez**; Dane Cook; Kathy Griffin; Amy Poehler; Andy Samberg	**Hayden Panettiere**; Leonardo DiCaprio; Angelina Jolie; Brad Pitt; Natalie Portman
Choice Male Athlete	Choice Female Athlete
**David Beckham**; Kobe Bryant; Roger Federer; Michael Phelps; Tiger Woods	**Shawn Johnson**; Nastia Liukin; Misty May-Treanor and Kerri Walsh Jennings; Danica Patrick; Serena Williams
Choice Male Action Sports Athlete	Choice Female Action Sports Athlete
**Ryan Sheckler**; Paul Rodriguez; Kelly Slater; James Stewart Jr.; Shaun White	**Stephanie Gilmore**; Gretchen Bleiler; Torah Bright; Lyn-Z Adams Hawkins; Carissa Moore
Choice Male Red Carpet Fashion Icon	Choice Female Red Carpet Fashion Icon
**Jonas Brothers**; Zac Efron; Adam Lambert; Justin Timberlake; Kanye West	**Selena Gomez**; Rachel Bilson; Miley Cyrus; Eva Longoria; Demi Lovato
Choice Celebrity Pet	Choice Video Game
**Bo – The Obamas' Portuguese Water Dog**; Kitty Purry – Katy Perry's Cat; Matzo Ball – Adam Sandler's Bulldog; Shadow – Vanessa Hudgens' Poodle; Vida Blue – Ashton Kutcher's Chihuahua	**Rock Band 2**; Grand Theft Auto IV; Guitar Hero: Metallica; Madden NFL '09; Mortal Kombat vs. DC Universe
Choice Celebrity Baby	Choice Celebrity Dancer
**Honor Marie – Jessica Alba and Cash Warren**; Harlow – Nicole Richie and Joel Madden; Seraphina – Jennifer Garner and Ben Affleck; Sunny – Adam Sandler and Jackie Sandler; Zuma – Gwen Stefani and Gavin Rossdale	**Selena Gomez**; Miley Cyrus; Fergie; Shawn Johnson; Lady Gaga
Choice Web Star	Choice Twit
**Fred Figglehorn**; Will Ferrell; Perez Hilton; Ashton Kutcher; Andy Samberg	**Ellen DeGeneres**; Kim Kardashian; Ashton Kutcher; MC Hammer; Shaquille O'Neal
