= Teen Choice Award for Choice TV Actor Drama =

Entertainment award category

The following is a list of Teen Choice Award winners and nominees for the Choice TV Actor – Drama award, which was formerly known as the Choice TV Actor – Action/Drama award.

== Winners and nominees ==
=== 1990s ===
Year	Winner	Nominees	Ref.
1999	Joshua Jackson – Dawson's Creek	Scott Wolf – Party of Five; Barry Watson – 7th Heaven; David Boreanaz – Buffy the Vampire Slayer; James Van Der Beek – Dawson's Creek; Joseph Gordon-Levitt – 3rd Rock from the Sun; Noah Wyle – ER; Scott Foley – Felicity	

=== 2000s ===
Year	Winner	Nominees	Ref.
2000	Joshua Jackson – Dawson's Creek	Frankie Muniz – Malcolm in the Middle; Jason Behr – Roswell; David Boreanaz – Buffy the Vampire Slayer; Seth Green – Buffy the Vampire Slayer; Topher Grace – That '70s Show; Scott Speedman – Felicity; Scott Foley – Felicity	
2001	Joshua Jackson – Dawson's Creek	Michael Weatherly – Dark Angel; Barry Watson – 7th Heaven; Frankie Muniz – Malcolm in the Middle; Jason Behr – Roswell; Ashton Kutcher – That '70s Show; Eric McCormack – Will & Grace; Topher Grace – That '70s Show	
2002	Barry Watson – 7th Heaven	Scott Foley – Felicity; Joshua Jackson – Dawson's Creek; James Marsters – Buffy the Vampire Slayer; Jared Padalecki – Gilmore Girls; Scott Speedman – Felicity; Tom Welling – Smallville; Shane West – Once and Again	
2003	David Gallagher – 7th Heaven	Bill Bellamy – Fastlane; Joshua Jackson – Dawson's Creek; James Marsters – Buffy the Vampire Slayer; Gregory Smith – Everwood; Kiefer Sutherland – 24; Michael Vartan – Alias; Tom Welling – Smallville	
2004	Adam Brody – The O.C.	Josh Duhamel – Las Vegas; David Gallagher – 7th Heaven; Ben McKenzie – The O.C.; Chad Michael Murray – One Tree Hill; Mekhi Phifer – ER; Gregory Smith – Everwood; Tom Welling – Smallville	
2005	Adam Brody – The O.C.	Matthew Fox – Lost; Tyler Hoechlin – 7th Heaven; Jesse McCartney – Summerland; Ben McKenzie – The O.C.; Chad Michael Murray – One Tree Hill; Gregory Smith – Everwood; Tom Welling – Smallville	
2006	Adam Brody – The O.C.	Patrick Dempsey – Grey's Anatomy; Matthew Fox – Lost; Chad Michael Murray – One Tree Hill; Kiefer Sutherland – 24; Tom Welling – Smallville	
2007	Hugh Laurie – House	Matthew Fox – Lost; Wentworth Miller – Prison Break; Jared Padalecki – Supernatural; Milo Ventimiglia – Heroes	
2008	Chad Michael Murray – One Tree Hill	Penn Badgley – Gossip Girl; Chace Crawford – Gossip Girl; Patrick Dempsey – Grey's Anatomy; Taylor Kitsch – Friday Night Lights	
2009	Chace Crawford – Gossip Girl	Penn Badgley – Gossip Girl; Ken Baumann – The Secret Life of the American Teenager; Joshua Jackson – Fringe; Dustin Milligan – 90210	

=== 2010s ===
Year	Winner	Nominees	Ref.
2010	Chace Crawford – Gossip Girl	Penn Badgley – Gossip Girl; Ken Baumann – The Secret Life of the American Teenager; Daren Kagasoff – The Secret Life of the American Teenager; Tristan Wilds – 90210	
2011	Chace Crawford – Gossip Girl	Penn Badgley – Gossip Girl; David Boreanaz – Bones; Daren Kagasoff – The Secret Life of the American Teenager; Hugh Laurie – House	
2012	Ian Harding – Pretty Little Liars	Penn Badgley – Gossip Girl; David Boreanaz – Bones; Kiefer Sutherland – Touch; Ed Westwick – Gossip Girl	
2013	Ian Harding – Pretty Little Liars	Penn Badgley – Gossip Girl; Josh Bowman – Revenge; Lucas Grabeel – Switched at Birth; Nick Wechsler – Revenge	
2014	Ian Harding – Pretty Little Liars	Keegan Allen – Pretty Little Liars; Jake T. Austin – The Fosters; Lucas Grabeel – Switched at Birth; Avan Jogia – Twisted	
2015	Ian Harding – Pretty Little Liars	Keegan Allen – Pretty Little Liars; Jake T. Austin – The Fosters; Nathan Fillon – Castle; Terence Howard – Empire; Jussie Smollett – Empire	
2016	Ian Harding – Pretty Little Liars	Keegan Allen – Pretty Little Liars; Tyler Blackburn – Pretty Little Liars; Terence Howard – Empire; Ben McKenzie – Gotham; Jussie Smollett – Empire	
2017	Cole Sprouse – Riverdale	Sterling K. Brown – This Is Us; Ian Harding – Pretty Little Liars; Jussie Smollett – Empire; Milo Ventimiglia – This Is Us; Jesse Williams – Grey's Anatomy	
2018	Cole Sprouse – Riverdale	KJ Apa – Riverdale; Sterling K. Brown – This Is Us; Freddie Highmore – The Good Doctor; Jussie Smollett – Empire; Jesse Williams – Grey's Anatomy	
2019	Cole Sprouse – Riverdale	KJ Apa – Riverdale; Sterling K. Brown – This Is Us; Justin Hartley – This Is Us; Adam Huber – Dynasty; Oliver Stark – 9-1-1	
