= Kaycee Stroh =

American actress

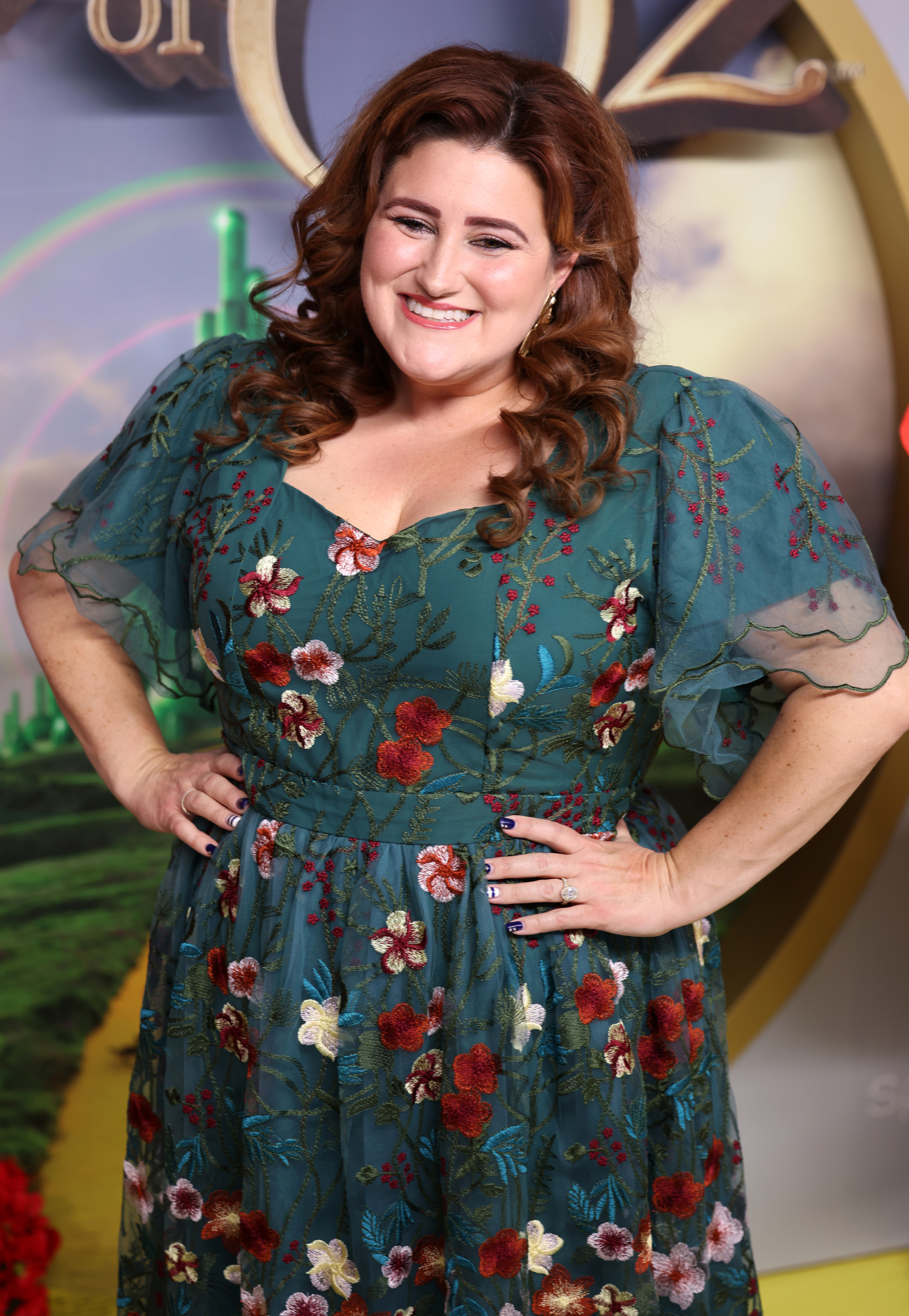
- Stroh in 2025
- Born: Salt Lake City, Utah, U.S.
- Occupation: Actress
- Years active: 2004–present
- Spouse: Ben Higginson (m. 2009)
- Children: 2

Kaycee Stroh is an American actress, singer and dancer, known for her role as Martha Cox in the High School Musical franchise. She was also a contestant in the VH1 reality series Celebrity Fit Club.

== Career ==
Stroh appeared in High School Musical, High School Musical 2 and High School Musical 3 as smart girl Martha Cox, who secretly loved to "pop & lock & jam & break". A professional dance instructor at the Thompson Lane Entertainment Center, her role in the franchise materialized when she took her students to the auditions herself. Along with her fellow cast for the movie, she appeared at the Teen Choice Awards to accept an honorary award charting the film's instant success and at the American Music Awards of 2007 accepting the award for Favorite Album. Stroh also serves as co-host for the dance-along version of High School Musical 2.

She also had a recurring role (2 episodes) in the Disney Channel Original Series, The Suite Life of Zack & Cody as Leslie, a girl who played on the same volleyball team as main characters of the show, London and Maddie. Stroh has also been a guest editor for Tiger Beat magazine. She was also a member of the supporting cast in a direct-to-DVD musical story from Liken the Scriptures called Ammon and King Lamoni. Stroh has worked on occasion as a spokesperson and plus size model for Torrid. She reprised her role as Martha Cox in High School Musical 3: Senior Year, released on October 24, 2008. Stroh was a contestant on Season 7 of Celebrity Fit Club.

Stroh played the role of Ms Darbus in the production of High School Musical at the Lowry Theatre in Manchester.

== Personal life ==
Stroh was born in Salt Lake City, Utah, the daughter of Cindy and Bruce Stroh. She has two older sisters, both of whom were dancers.

In an interview with People, Stroh discussed her obesity and heavy weight gain and being bed-ridden for three months due to a blood clot in her calf after knee surgery. As well as her television roles, Stroh is also an advocate for Make-A-Wish Foundation, United Cerebral Palsy and Starlight Starbright Children's Foundation.

Stroh married Ben Higginson on January 9, 2009 in the Salt Lake Temple of the Church of Jesus Christ of Latter-day Saints. Zac Efron, Vanessa Hudgens, Ashley Tisdale, Lucas Grabeel, Monique Coleman, Olesya Rulin, Chris Warren Jr., Ryne Sanborn and Kenny Ortega all attended the wedding reception. They have two daughters, born in May 2013 and October 2015.

== Filmography ==
Film, television, and videos
Year	Title	Role	Notes
2004	Ammon and King Lamoni	Dancer	Direct-to-Video film
2006	High School Musical	Martha Cox	Disney Channel Original Movie
2006–08	The Suite Life of Zack & Cody	Leslie	2 episodes
2007	High School Musical 2	Martha Cox	Disney Channel Original Movie
2008	High School Musical 3: Senior Year	Martha Cox	Theatrical film
2008	Mother Goose Parade	Honorary Grand Marshal	TV film
2009	Hannah Montana: The Movie	Herself (non-speaking cameo)	Theatrical film
2010	Celebrity Fit Club	Herself	5 episodes
2010	The League	Cathy	Episode: "High School Reunion"
2011	Shapetown, USA	Liz Smelton	Actress for 4 episodes Associate Producer for 5 episodes
2017	Holly, Jingles and Clyde 3D	Tara	Film
2018	Andi Mack	Zoe	Episode: "Andi's Choice"
2019	High School Musical: The Musical: The Series	Teacher Kaycee	Episode: "What Team?"
2020	The Disney Family Singalong	Herself	Special

=== Music videos ===
List of music videos, showing director
Title	Year	Director	Artist	Notes
"Telephone"	2010	Jonas Åkerlund	Lady Gaga	Cameo appearance

== Discography ==
=== Soundtracks ===
Year	Album
2006	High School Musical OST
2007	High School Musical 2 OST
2008	DisneyMania 6
2008	Princess DisneyMania
2008	High School Musical 3: Senior Year OST

=== Singles ===
Year	Title	Album	Billboard Hot 100 Chart Peak	Pop 100 Chart Peak	UK
2006	"Stick to the Status Quo" (credited as High School Musical Cast)	High School Musical OST	43	37	–
2007	"Work This Out" (credited as High School Musical 2 Cast)	High School Musical 2 OST	110	73	78
