= The Amazing Mrs Pritchard =

British television drama series

- Created by: Sally Wainwright
- Starring: Jane Horrocks; Carey Mulligan; Steven Mackintosh; Jodhi May; Janet McTeer; Geraldine James; Selina Cadell; Jemma Mckenzie-Brown
- Country of origin: United Kingdom
- Original language: English
- No. of series: 1
- No. of episodes: 6

Production
- Running time: 60 minutes

Original release
- Network: BBC One
- Release: 3 October – 7 November 2006

The Amazing Mrs Pritchard is a British drama television series that aired on BBC One in 2006. Produced by Kudos, it was written by Sally Wainwright and stars Jane Horrocks in the title role of a woman with no previous political experience who becomes Prime Minister of the United Kingdom.

== Plot ==
The Amazing Mrs Pritchard revolves around supermarket manager Ros Pritchard, who, angry with the state of British politics, stands for election as an independent candidate in her home town of Eatanswill, Yorkshire. She soon gains national attention, forming the Purple Alliance alongside former Conservatives and Liberal Democrats and winning the general election, becoming prime minister. Over successive episodes, Ros's spontaneous approach to decision making and her promise never to deceive the electorate come under increasing pressure from the demands of government, media scrutiny, and partisan political struggles.

== Cast and characters ==
=== Main cast ===
- Jane Horrocks - Prime Minister Rosamund 'Ros' Jane Pritchard
- Steven Mackintosh - Ian Pritchard
- Carey Mulligan - Emily Pritchard
- Jemma McKenzie-Brown - Georgina Pritchard
- Jodhi May - Miranda Lennox
- Janet McTeer - Catherine Walker
- Frances Tomelty - Kitty Porter
- Geraldine James - Hilary Rees-Benson
- Selina Cadell - Dorothy Crowther
- Meera Syal - Liz Shannon
- Siobhan Finneran - Beverley Clarke
- Jonathan Aris - Richard Leavis
- Sally Phillips - Meg Bayliss
- Tom Mison - Ben Sixsmith
- Robert Portal - Paul Critchley
- Dilys Laye - Queen Elizabeth II

=== Characters ===
Rosamund 'Ros' Jane Pritchard is a supermarket manager who creates her own party, the Purple Democratic Alliance. Ros succeeds Tony Blair, having won the general election by a huge landslide. When she first comes to the job she knows nothing about politics, but with the help of her advisor Catherine Walker, who becomes deputy prime minister and Chancellor of the Exchequer, she warms to the job, dealing with crises such as a plane exploding over Walthamstow and proposing a one-day-a-week car ban.

Ian Pritchard is Ros's husband. He doubts her campaign, and later admits that he didn't vote for her. Unknown to Ros at the time, Ian laundered money many years before her taking office, a scandal which, as it starts to emerge, may force her to resign.

Emily Pritchard is Ros's older daughter. Emily finds her mother's new fame hard to deal with. Initially a student at the University of Sussex, she soon drops out. A magazine deal sees naked pictures of her projected onto the Houses of Parliament. And when her father admits his money laundering to Emily, it is a secret she finds hard to keep.

Catherine Walker is a Conservative front-bencher designated by her party to demolish Ros in debate, but who instead defects to Ros's Purple Alliance. She becomes deputy prime minister and Chancellor of the Exchequer. As a young woman at the University of Oxford, Catherine had the chance of a fellowship to study at Princeton University but her then-tutor Hilary Rees-Benson (later a political opponent) recommended another student instead, in part due to jealousy of Catherine—the two remain rivals even when serving together in Ros's cabinet. Catherine was formerly in love with Conservative Party Leader Paul Critchley, but he cheated on her and dropped her. While Chancellor, she conducts a sexual relationship with her speechwriter Ben Sixsmith—21 years her junior—becoming pregnant by him but terminating the pregnancy.

Hilary Rees-Benson is the Home Secretary in Ros's government. She was formerly a Liberal Democratic Party Home Affairs spokesman, and has an ongoing personal and political conflict with Catherine Walker (above). Rees-Benson leaks a number of secrets to the writer Alex Rafael about Pritchard's government, which damages it. She almost has to resign but agrees to absolute loyalty to Ros. Hilary makes a success of Ros's controversial proposal for Green Wednesday, a car ban on every Wednesday.

Kitty Porter is a wealthy businesswoman who becomes one of Ros's earliest supporters, bankrolling her campaign. But Kitty's behind-the-scenes machinations represent another time bomb waiting to explode.

Paul Critchley is the Leader of the Conservative Party and the Leader of the Opposition to Ros's Government. He holds a bitter grudge against Catherine, his former lover, who in his eyes betrayed him and his party by defecting to Ros. Critchley's skill as a parliamentary debater, and his ruthless willingness to throw a politically inconvenient colleague overboard, epitomise the peak of traditional politics, and contrast with the spontaneous, idealistic—if at times naive—approach embodied by Ros, at least in the earlier episodes before political life starts to harden her.

=== Guests and cameos ===
Several politicians and journalists made cameo appearances, including Tony Blair, Gavin Esler, Roy Hattersley, John Humphrys, Nick Robinson, David Steel, Andrew Marr, Simon McCoy, Sarah Montague, Peter Snow and Kirsty Wark.

== Production ==
=== Development ===
Sally Wainwright stated her motivation for writing the series was the realisation that:

"During the last election I found that I didn't really want to vote for anybody because they all seemed as bad as each other. I thought it would be great fun to write an epic story with a central character who was prepared to stand up and point this out. Mrs Pritchard is bold enough, or some may say daft enough, to stand for parliament on the assumption that she can do just as badly as any of them but at least she will be honest".

The Amazing Mrs Pritchard was filmed in London in April 2006, and the episodes were broadcast at 9:00 pm on Tuesdays. It fared poorly in the ratings, attracting 3.5 million viewers in the final episode.

== Episodes ==
No.	Title	Directed by	Written by	Original release date	UK Viewers
1	"Episode 1"	Declan Lowney	Sally Wainwright	3 October 2006	4.3 million (19% audience share)
After an incident between the Conservative and Labour candidates outside the supermarket she manages, Greengages, Ros Pritchard decides to stand for Parliament in the upcoming general election. She soon appears on Newsnight, and within days her new party, The Purple Democratic Alliance, has over 150 candidates and rising, plus, thanks to her supporter the businesswoman Kitty Porter, a campaign fund of £10 million. While her two daughters, Emily and Georgina, are very supportive, her husband Ian tries to persuade her to pull out, especially when The Sun publishes an article about his office flirtations. Soon, women MPs (especially) from all parties are defecting to her. An ambitious frontbench Conservative, Catherine Walker, assigned by her Party leader (and ex-lover) Paul Critchley to demolish Ros on TV, instead switches sides after Ros convinces Catherine that her male Tory colleagues will never allow her to rise to the position she craves and is qualified for, that of Chancellor of the Exchequer (but implies that she, Ros, would offer Catherine the post). On voting day, 12 May, Ian votes for the Liberal Democrats, and again tries to persuade Ros to stop. Secretly this is because of money-laundering issues in his past that he is worried will come out (though Kitty Porter and Ros's new-found "fixer" Miranda Lennox have done their best to suppress a journalist's interest in these issues). On election night, instead of watching the election "count", Ros accompanies Dave, a troubled worker from the supermarket, to the hospital. There she gets a call from Tony Blair congratulating her on winning the election.
2	"Episode 2"	Declan Lowney	Sally Wainwright	10 October 2006	4 million (18% audience share)
Ros has won the election with 54% of the vote and 378 seats, the Conservatives are the Official Opposition with 147 seats, while Labour has 121 seats. The Queen (played by Dilys Laye) asks her to form the next Government, and after some reluctance, Ros does so. She meets Richard Leavis, her new Principal Private Secretary. But she soon finds life at the top very demanding. Her first decision comes when the French President requests her help to rescue French military personnel trapped in Iran; Ros spontaneously agrees, but must then face painful consequences she had not counted on. On her first evening at No 10, she gets advice from Tony Blair on how to escape Whitehall, and she goes back to Greengages incognito and pours her heart out to one of her old colleagues. Soon after, she launches "The Great Debate" where she asks the public for ideas for the Queen's Speech. One of these is the idea to move Parliament to Bradford, and she includes this in "The People's Queen's Speech". Meanwhile, Catherine Walker has been made Chancellor and Deputy Prime Minister, Hilary Rees-Benson (a former Liberal Democrat MP) is Home Secretary, and former Labour MP Dorothy Crowther became Foreign Secretary. Ros's younger daughter Georgina insists on going to a London school, and asks to be sent to Jericho Road School, a run down, inner city comprehensive.
3	"Episode 3"	Simon Curtis	Sally Wainwright	17 October 2006	4 million (18% audience share)
The House of Lords refuses to pass Ros's Parliamentary Reform Bill because of the clause moving Parliament to Bradford, and Ros wants to use the Parliament Acts 1911 and 1949 to bypass the Lords, but Catherine Walker tries to persuade her not to. However, after days of thinking she does invoke the Parliament Acts. Meanwhile, a book about Ros's rise to power is published. It's heavily critical of Catherine and also says that Ros and Ian's marriage is in a bad state, which they both know has an element of truth. It is clear that a close colleague has leaked to the author, but who? Ros asks Miranda to question all the possible suspects. A visit from an African President initially gets off to a good start, but turns to heartbreak when Ros has to tell him that his family was just assassinated in London. Georgina gets a boyfriend from school. Emily poses nude for a lads' magazine, and the image is projected onto the side of Parliament. She then spends the £20,000 she got on a sports car, which leads to a frustrated Ian telling her how he once received £10,000 for laundering money.
4	"Episode 4"	Simon Curtis	Sally Wainwright	24 October 2006	3.4 million (15.6% audience share)
In the year following her election, Ros continued work on her radical agenda, with Parliament set to open in its new location in 2010. She has also distanced Britain from the U.S. government's anti-terrorism orientation. Soon after asserting this independent British stance, a Lithuanian aeroplane crashes over Walthamstow in east London. During a parliamentary debate on the matter, Conservative Leader Paul Critchley goads Ros into pledging to resign if the crash is the result of terrorism — a pledge she immediately regrets. To her political good fortune, the crash turns out to ensue from European Union legislation allowing for less stringent air safety guidelines. Ros vows to subject future EU legislation to tougher parliamentary scrutiny, and the episode is further turned to the government's political advantage when Catherine's staff discover that a leading Conservative had slept through the parliamentary review of the relevant EU safety standards – leading to a scene in which Paul Critchley brutally destroys the offending colleague's political career. Meanwhile, after a night on the town, Junior Health Minister Beverley Clarke has to resign after The World newspaper publishes embarrassing pictures of her. A tearful Beverley reveals to Miranda that, during her night out, she had learnt that Kitty had bribed MP Liz Shannon and others to defect to the Purple Alliance before the election. Miranda decides to keep this potentially compromising information away from Ros while confronting those involved herself. Ros finds condoms in Georgina's pocket. Emily has dropped out of Sussex University and has to be persuaded by Kitty not to tell her mother about Ian's money laundering.
5	"Episode 5"	Catherine Morshead	Sally Wainwright	31 October 2006	3.2 million (14% audience share)
At a G8 summit on Vancouver Island, Canada, Ros spontaneously announces that in a month's time, on 24 June, and every Wednesday after that, only essential car journeys will be allowed. The government had been contemplating only a restricted trial of this concept, and Catherine is very doubtful about launching it as a national scheme, especially as there is a by-election in the safe Conservative seat of Stonesfield on the same day. However, she tells Ros they must now pull out all the stops to win, and when the day comes they not only win the by-election by 342 votes, but France, Finland, Norway and Germany announce they will join the UK in having a one-day-a-week car ban. Richard Leavis discovers that it was Hilary Rees-Benson who talked to the author of the damaging book. Advised by Leavis and Miranda to keep the information to herself, while readying Hilary as a scapegoat if the Green Wednesday project fails, Ros reacts that such calculation is not her style and instead tells Hilary what she knows, receiving a pledge of loyalty in return. Meanwhile, Emily quits as Kitty's apprentice after a fortnight and in anger tells Ros about Ian's money laundering. Catherine, who has been secretly dating her much younger speechwriter, Ben Sixsmith, for a year, finds out she's pregnant and immediately has an abortion.
6	"Episode 6"	Catherine Morshead	Sally Wainwright	7 November 2006	3.5 million (15% audience share)
After finding out from Emily about Ian's money laundering 15 years ago, Ros confronts Ian, who says he didn't tell her at the time because he and his boss had been threatened by criminal loan sharks into undertaking the laundering, and it came at a time when she had suffered 9 miscarriages. After sleeping on it, she decides that – in spite of her promises of transparency – she will not resign or report Ian to the police. If the story comes out, she tries to persuade herself, she can still claim ignorance. Meanwhile, after talking to Ros about her abortion, Catherine reopens the possibility of marriage with Ben, but when he asks her to kiss him in public, she cannot abandon her stiff upper lip to do so. Kitty Porter now warns Miranda that, as the price for continuing to keep Ian's money laundering quiet, a home office IT contract needs to go to a new company she has invested in along with the newspaper publisher she had earlier persuaded to suppress the story about Ian. Ros, departing further from the standards of probity she was elected on, tries to persuade Hilary as Home Secretary to give Kitty's company the contract. Worried, Hilary shares her concerns with her long-time rival, Catherine, who confronts Ros and learns the truth about Ian. Catherine advises Ros that, to maintain her political credibility, she needs to divorce Ian. If she will not do this, she must resign. In the closing scene of the series, Ian enters Ros's office to speak to her alone. Ros's decision on her future is not revealed. Note: In an airing of the show by Knowledge Network in British Columbia, the final episode ended with a brief written description of what transpired: Mrs. Pritchard resigned, stating that she had made her point; the family moved back to Eatanswill; and Ian's indiscretions never became public knowledge. Catherine Walker became prime minister, successfully leading the Purple Alliance, but never marrying. This addendum was not part of the PBS airing in the U.S., but was included on the DVD releases.

== Home media ==
The Amazing Mrs Pritchard was released on DVD in the US (Region 1) on 30 October 2007.

== See also ==
- List of fictional prime ministers of the United Kingdom
