= I Kissed a Vampire =

- Directed by: Chris Nolan
- Written by: Chris Nolan; Laurie Nolan
- Story by: Chris Nolan; Laurie Nolan
- Produced by: Laurie Nolan
- Starring: Lucas Grabeel; Drew Seeley; Adrian Slade
- Cinematography: Christopher Gosch
- Edited by: Chris Nolan
- Music by: Frankie Blue
- Production company: Alter Ego Industries
- Distributed by: Monterey Media
- Release date: March 30, 2012
- Running time: 90 minutes
- Country: United States
- Language: English

I Kissed a Vampire is a 2009 rock musical (also known as a "vampirical") web series starring Lucas Grabeel, Drew Seeley, and Adrian Slade. It was adapted into a film of the same name in 2012, which premiered in March 2012 with music written by Frankie Blue, lyrics by Blue and Chris Sean Nolan, and a script by Laurie Nolan.

== Plot ==
Dylan Knight transforms into a vampire after being bitten by a bat. The film features him attempting to resolve conflict between his girlfriend, Sara Lane, and his vampire mentor neighbor, Trey Sylvania.

== Cast ==
- Lucas Grabeel as Dylan Knight
- Drew Seeley as Trey Sylvania
- Adrian Slade as Sara Lane
- Amy Paffrath as Luna Dark
- Sally Slade as Sally Sucker
- Katie Seeley as Lydia Bloodworth
- Mike Slade as Dr. Payne
- Autumn Grabeel as Penny Plasma
- Emily Morris as Desiree Damned

== Critical reception ==
A review from The Hollywood Reporter was negative, stating that the "script reads like a half-hearted attempt to get from one musical number to the next — forgivable, perhaps, if any of the songs were worth hearing. Our would-be Bieber and Britney do the best they can with risible material and choreography that will inspire pity from generous viewers — their song-and-dance interrupted by a couple of comic relief subplots so corny and overacted one imagines they’re leftover from a porn parody of vampire flicks. Production design and costumes are similarly low-grade."

== Soundtrack ==
iTunes edition
No.	Title	Recording artist(s)	Length
1.	"I Kissed a Vampire Theme"	Frankie Blue	1:52
2.	"Don't Click"	Adrian Slade	1:07
3.	"Outta My Head"	Lucas Grabeel	2:56
4.	"So Cool"	Frankie Blue	0:46
5.	"Forbidden Planet"	Adrian Slade	3:02
6.	"Trey Arrives"	Frankie Blue	0:40
7.	"Love's in Vein"	Drew Seeley & Frankie Blue	3:20
8.	"See the Dark"	Frankie Blue	1:01
9.	"You Should Come"	Frankie Blue	0:30
10.	"Vampire Party"	Frankie Blue	2:53
11.	"Just a Little Peck"	Adrian Slade, Drew Seeley, and Lucas Grabeel	3:35
12.	"Long, Long, Long Time"	Frankie Blue	0:29
13.	"Happily Afterlife"	Adrian Slade, Drew Seeley, and Lucas Grabeel	3:25

== See also ==
- List of vampire television series
