= High School Musical 3: Senior Year =

- Theatrical release poster
- Directed by: Kenny Ortega
- Written by: Peter Barsocchini
- Based on: Characters by Peter Barsocchini
- Produced by: Bill Borden; Barry Rosenbush
- Starring: Zac Efron; Vanessa Hudgens; Ashley Tisdale; Lucas Grabeel; Corbin Bleu; Monique Coleman
- Cinematography: Daniel Aranyò
- Edited by: Don Brochu
- Music by: David Lawrence
- Production companies: Walt Disney Pictures; Borden & Rosenbush Entertainment
- Distributed by: Walt Disney Studios Motion Pictures
- Release dates: October 17, 2008 (UK); October 24, 2008 (United States)
- Running time: 112 minutes
- Country: United States
- Language: English
- Budget: $30 million
- Box office: $252.9 million

High School Musical 3: Senior Year is a 2008 American teen musical film directed and co-choreographed by Kenny Ortega, produced by Bill Borden and Barry Rosenbush, and written by Peter Barsocchini. The sequel to High School Musical 2 (2007), it is the third installment in the High School Musical film series and the final installment of the original trilogy. The film follows Troy Bolton (Zac Efron), Gabriella Montez (Vanessa Hudgens), Sharpay Evans (Ashley Tisdale), her twin brother Ryan Evans (Lucas Grabeel), Chad Danforth (Corbin Bleu), and Taylor McKessie (Monique Coleman), who are in their final year of high school and face the daunting prospect of being separated as they go off to college. Joined by the rest of their East High classmates, they stage their last spring musical, reflecting their experiences, hopes, and fears about the future. In addition to Efron, Hudgens, Tisdale, Grabeel, Bleu, and Coleman, Olesya Rulin, Chris Warren Jr., Ryne Sanborn, Kaycee Stroh, Bart Johnson, Socorro Herrera, Leslie Wing Pomeroy, Robert Curtis Brown, and Alyson Reed also reprise their roles from the previous films, joined by Jemma McKenzie-Brown, Matt Prokop, Justin Martin, Jessica Tuck, and David Reivers in new roles.

High School Musical 3: Senior Year was developed immediately following the success of its predecessor. Production returned to Utah for which Disney received a $2 million tax-break incentive, the largest the state has ever given to a film. Principal photography began in May 2008 and Walt Disney Pictures diverted a larger production and marketing budget to accommodate a theatrical release. The production returned to previous filming locations East High School and Murray High School, while additional scenes were filmed in Los Angeles.

High School Musical 3: Senior Year premiered in London on October 17, 2008, and was theatrically released in the United States on October 24, making it the only theatrical release in the franchise. Upon release, the film proved to be a moderate critical success, with some critics noting it as an improvement over the previous two installments due to the more emotional tone and themes, while many praised the higher production values. The film was also a commercial success, as it grossed $90.5 million worldwide in its first three days of release, setting a new record for the largest opening weekend for a musical film. Overall, the film grossed $252.9 million worldwide. The film's soundtrack was also successful, debuting and peaking at number two on the Billboard 200 in the United States. A spin-off film, Sharpay's Fabulous Adventure (2011), was released direct-to-video and on television.

== Plot ==
East High's Wildcats basketball team compete against their long-time rival, the West High Knights, in the final game of the season. At the half, East High is severely losing. However, Troy Bolton rallies his teammates and wins the game ("Now or Never"). During the team's celebratory party, Troy and Gabriella Montez discuss their unknown future and the short time they have left at East High. ("Right Here, Right Now")

The next day, at school, Ms. Darbus notices the lack of students signing up for the musical and Sharpay Evans suggests a one-woman show. Kelsi Nielsen signs up everyone in homeroom, much to the class' dismay. Ms. Darbus announces that the show will be called "Senior Year", focusing on the future of the graduating seniors, and reveals that Sharpay, her brother Ryan, Kelsi and Troy have all been considered for a scholarship at Juilliard but only one will be chosen. Sharpay becomes desperate to win and, knowing that Kelsi will give the best songs to Troy and Gabriella, gets Ryan to try to persuade Kelsi to give them a song by predicting her and Ryan's future ("I Want It All"). Sharpay later befriends Tiara Gold, a British transfer student, and they begin working together.

While on the rooftop, Troy asks Gabriella to prom and she teaches him how to dance ("Can I Have This Dance?"), while Taylor refuses Chad's pathetic attempt to ask her to the dance. She later relents when Chad asks again in front of the other students during lunch. The group rehearses for the musical with a scene about their prom night ("A Night to Remember"). The next day, Ryan and Kelsi rehearse ("Just Wanna Be With You"), which leads to Ryan asking Kelsi to prom, while Troy and Chad reminisce about their past in Riley's Auto Parts ("The Boys are Back"). Tiara learns Gabriella has been accepted into the Stanford Freshman's Honors Program and informs Sharpay, who, in turn, informs Troy and convinces him that he is the only thing keeping Gabriella from going. Troy convinces Gabriella to go and she leaves for college the next day ("Walk Away").

Troy and his father Jack argue about which college he will attend and Troy drives to East High conflicted until he finally screams in anger in the theater ("Scream"). Witnessing this, Ms. Darbus reveals that she sent in his application for Juilliard. Troy gets a call from Gabriella saying that although she loves him, she will not return for prom nor graduation. However, on the day of the prom, Troy visits Gabriella at Stanford and they have their own dance ("Can I Have This Dance? (Reprise)"). Meanwhile, Sharpay prepares for the musical at East High and Troy texts his teammate Jimmie "Rocket Man" Zara to be his understudy because he is going to be late for the show.

Kelsi and Ryan start the show ("Senior Year Spring Musical"). As Troy and Gabriella's understudies, Jimmie performs with Sharpay and embarrasses her, although the audience applauds. Troy and Gabriella appear during the second half of the show and sing their duet together. Tiara betrays Sharpay, telling her she will take over the drama department in the next semester. Humiliated, Sharpay ultimately joins Tiara's performance and upstages her as payback.

At the end of the musical, Ms. Darbus reveals that both Kelsi and Ryan have won the Juilliard scholarship and Troy reveals he has chosen to attend the University of California, Berkeley to be close to Gabriella, play basketball and perform in theater. Taylor reveals that she will be attending Yale University with honors to study political science and Sharpay and Chad reveal they will attend the University of Albuquerque for performing arts and basketball, respectively ("We're All In This Together (Graduation Mix)"). At the graduation ceremony, Troy gives the class speech after being selected by Ms. Darbus, and everyone celebrates ("High School Musical"). The six students walk toward the stage and take their final bows as the curtain closes.

== Cast ==
- Zac Efron as Troy Bolton
- Vanessa Hudgens as Gabriella Montez
- Ashley Tisdale as Sharpay Evans
- Lucas Grabeel as Ryan Evans
- Corbin Bleu as Chad Danforth
- Monique Coleman as Taylor McKessie
- Bart Johnson as Jack Bolton
- Alyson Reed as Ms. Darbus
- Olesya Rulin as Kelsi Nielsen
- Chris Warren Jr. as Zeke Baylor
- Ryne Sanborn as Jason Cross
- Kaycee Stroh as Martha Cox
- Matt Prokop as Jimmie "Rocket Man" Zara, a freshman basketball player who idolizes Troy.
- Justin Martin as Donny Dion, a freshman basketball player who idolizes Chad.
- Jemma McKenzie-Brown as Tiara Gold, a freshman British exchange student who becomes Sharpay's assistant.
- Jessica Tuck as Darby Evans, Sharpay and Ryan's mother.
- Robert Curtis Brown as Vance Evans, Sharpay and Ryan's father.
- David Reivers as Charlie Danforth, Chad's father. Reivers is Bleu's real-life father.

Additionally, Leslie Wing Pomeroy and Socorro Herrera reprise their roles from previous films as Lucille Bolton and Lisa Montez, Troy and Gabriella's respective mothers. Dave Fox portrays Bolton's assistant Coach Kellogg, Yolanda Wood plays Chad's mother Jenny Danforth and Joey Miyashima reprises his role as Principal Dave Matsui.

Stan Ellsworth plays Mr. Riley, Jeremy Banks plays a stagehand and Todd Snyder and Tara Starling appear as the representatives of Juilliard. Director Kenny Ortega's dog, Manly "Little Pickles" Ortega, reprises his role as Sharpay's pet Yorkie Boi.

== Musical numbers ==
Song	Lead singer(s)	Setting(s)	Notes
"Now or Never"	Troy, Gabriella, Chad, Zeke and Jason	East High gym	The championship game
"Right Here, Right Now"	Troy and Gabriella	Troy's Treehouse	The after-party at the Bolton residence
"I Want It All"	Sharpay and Ryan	East High cafeteria	Sharpay and Ryan's fantasy sequence
"Can I Have This Dance?"	Troy and Gabriella	Rooftop garden of East High	Gabriella teaching Troy the waltz
"A Night to Remember"	Troy, Gabriella, Ryan, Sharpay, Chad, Taylor, Jason, Zeke, Martha, and Kelsi	East High Auditorium	A rehearsal for a musical number
"Just Wanna Be with You"	Ryan, Kelsi, Troy and Gabriella	East High Auditorium/East High Music Room	A declaration of friendship that survives against all odds
"The Boys Are Back"	Troy and Chad	Riley's Auto Salvage Junkyard	Troy and Chad reliving childhood memories and finding out what they want to be in life
"Right Here, Right Now" (Reprise)	Troy and Gabriella	Gabriella's house/Troy's treehouse	Emotional reprise of "Right Here, Right Now"; Troy and Gabriella worrying about how far away they'll be from each other (Only on extended version)
"Walk Away"	Gabriella	Gabriella's house	Gabriella's move to Stanford University
"Scream"	Troy	Throughout East High	Troy's confusion about his future after Gabriella leaves
"Can I Have This Dance?" (Reprise)	Troy and Gabriella	Stanford University/East High Auditorium	Troy convincing Gabriella to come back for the musical and graduation
"Senior Year Spring Musical"	Troy, Gabriella, Ryan, Sharpay, Chad, Kelsi, Jason, Zeke, Martha, Jimmie and Tiara	East High Auditorium (The Spring Musical performance)	Featuring: "Last Chance" (Kelsi and Ryan) "Now or Never (Reprise)" (Troy, Martha, Chad, Zeke and Jason) "I Want it All (Reprise)" (Ryan) "Just Wanna Be with You (Reprise)" (Sharpay, Jimmie, Troy and Gabriella) "A Night to Remember (Reprise)" (Sharpay and Tiara)
"We're All in This Together (Graduation Mix)"	Troy, Gabriella, Ryan, Sharpay, Chad, Taylor, Kelsi, Martha, Zeke, Jason, Jimmie, Donnie and Tiara (on soundtrack); Choir (in film)	East High auditorium/graduation ceremony on the East High Football Field	A slower, graduation-tuned reprise of the song
"High School Musical"	Troy, Gabriella, Ryan, Sharpay, Chad, Taylor, Kelsi, Martha, Zeke, Jason, Jimmie, Donnie and Tiara	Graduation ceremony on the East High Football Field	The finale
"Just Getting Started"	Stan Carrizosa	End credits	Heard over end credits

== Production ==
Discussing returning for a third film in September 2007, Zac Efron told People magazine, "I can tell you that if the script is good and if we all agree on a final script, then there's nothing that is going to hold us back from doing it. We have fun making these movies and that's very rare in this business." Rumors persisted of ongoing salary disputes between Disney and the lead performers, particularly Efron. According to Rachel Abramowitz, as reported online by the Chicago Tribune, Efron was reported to be asking for $5 million, though she noted he had been offered closer to $3 million. Disney had planned to make the film before the Writers Guild strike and Screen Actors Guild strike shut down Hollywood for several months. The film was originally titled Haunted High School Musical with plans of a Halloween theme that were later scrapped.

Despite early reports that Vanessa Hudgens would be dropped from the film due to her nude photo scandal, Disney denied the reports, saying, "Vanessa has apologized for what was obviously a lapse in judgment. We hope she's learned a valuable lesson." In November 2007, director and choreographer Kenny Ortega stated that pre-production would most likely start in January 2008, with filming planning to take place in Salt Lake City, Utah. At that time, the script was finalized and the music was being worked on. He hinted that the plot would revolve around the Wildcats' final year in high school and stated, "it looks like we've rounded up the cast". The returning cast and film's plot were announced in January 2008.

Principal photography began on May 3, 2008; the 41 days scheduled for shooting was a longer period than for the first two films. The production received a $2 million filming incentive from Utah's Governor's Office of Economic Opportunity board to entice the production to film in Salt Lake City, including at East High School. High School Musical 3 was scheduled for release in theaters in the United States on October 24, 2008. The film had a $30 million budget and was said at the time to be the final installment with the current cast. The film introduced three new characters, Tiara Gold (Jemma McKenzie-Brown), Jimmie "The Rocket" Zara (Matt Prokop) and Donny Fox (Justin Martin), who were viewed by producer Bill Borden as the stars for a potential fourth film for Disney Channel.

Stan Carrizosa, the winner of ABC's reality show High School Musical: Get in the Picture, appears in "Just Getting Started", a song that is played over the end credits of the theatrical release of the film. The show's other 11 finalists were featured in the music video as well.

The film's musical numbers were choreographed by Kenny Ortega, Bonnie Story and Charles Klapow, who had previously collaborated on the first two films. Story described the transition from television to theatrical production as requiring larger ensembles and choreography designed for specific camera shots rather than continuous stage performance. The opening basketball sequence incorporated cheerleaders, drill teams, pep bands and flag performers, with movement coordinated across the different groups.

== Release ==
=== Sing-along version ===
A sing-along edition with lyrics highlighted on the screen was released in select theaters on November 7, 2008, two weeks following its initial release.

=== Box office ===
High School Musical 3: Senior Year opened with $17 million on Friday, setting the biggest opening day for a musical film of all time, until the record was topped in 2012 by Les Miserables ($18.1 million). It debuted at the #1 spot (beating out Saw V) with an opening weekend of $42,030,184 in the United States and breaking the record, previously held by Enchanted, for the biggest opening ever for a movie musical. This record would later be broken by Pitch Perfect 2 in 2015 ($69.2 million). The film also opened at #1 overseas, with an international opening of $42,622,505. The film ultimately grossed $90,559,416 in North America and $162,349,761 in other territories, leading to a worldwide total of $252,909,177.

=== Critical reception ===
High School Musical 3: Senior Year has a Rotten Tomatoes rating of 64%, based on 132 reviews, with an average rating of 5.95/10. The site's critical consensus reads, "It won't win many converts, but High School Musical 3 is bright, energetic, and well-crafted." The site also gave it a Golden Tomato for best musical film of 2008. On Metacritic, which assigns a weighted average score, the film has a score of 57 out of 100, based on 26 critics, which indicates "mixed or average" reviews. Audiences polled by CinemaScore gave the film an average grade of "A" on an A+ to F scale.

The Telegraph praised the changes brought about by the higher budget of a theatrical release: "High School Musical 3 uses its bigger budget to inject colour, scale, and visual depth. The opening basketball game alone is dizzying as the camera swoops high and wide before a winning point makes the crowd erupt". Stephen Farber, writing for Reuters, says the film "will please fan base but won't win converts", as the story "never really does kick in" and that "the picture quickly grows tedious", while MSNBC's Alonso Duralde describes it as "a stitched-together Frankenstein monster of an entertainment, featuring major components that were already trotted out the first two times." Peter Bradshaw of The Guardian describes the film as so bland that it "makes cellophane taste like chicken jalfrezi", and says that "the sheer squeaky-cleanness of everything is creepy, and when the characters are called upon to dance, they do so with robotic efficiency, and sing in that decaffeinated high vibrato, like 21st-century Hollywood castrati."

Entertainment Weekly was very positive towards the film, praising the stars' energy: "the beauty of Efron's performance is that he's a vibrant athletic hoofer who leaps and clowns with the heartthrob vigor of a young Erika Casanova, yet he's also achingly sincere. His fast-break alertness makes him the most empathetic of teen idols; he's like a David Cassidy who knows how to act, and who can swoon without getting too moist about it. Apart from Efron, the breakout star is Ashley Tisdale, whose Sharpay makes narcissism a goofy, bedazzled pleasure." MovieGuide has also favorably reviewed the film, strongly recommending it for the family as "fun, clean and full of energy" and describing it as "thin on plot" yet nevertheless "a phenomenon". BBC film critic Mark Kermode loved the film and said it was in his top 5 films for the year, and named Tisdale the "Best Supporting Actress" of 2008.

The Fort Worth Star-Telegram stated that the latest installment was "critic-proof" and "everything fans could hope for and more." They go on to say that "the kids finally look like true performers rather than Disney Channel mainstays desperately trying to remain relevant, and they deserve the lucrative careers that lie ahead" and gave the film a rating of four out of five stars. Hudgens was recognized as Kids' Choice Children's Pick at Nickelodeon's 2009 Kids' Choice Awards, Efron was voted Best Male Performance at the 2009 MTV Movie Awards and Choice Actor: Music/Dance at the 2009 Teen Choice Awards, and Tisdale was voted Breakthrough Performance Female at the 2009 MTV Movie Awards and Best Supporting Actress at the 2009 UK Kermode Awards.

=== Accolades ===
Year	Award	Category	Result
2008	CMA Wild and Young Awards	Best Actor International (Zac Efron)	Won
2008	CMA Wild and Young Awards	Most Popular Celebrity International (Zac Efron)	Won
2008	Phoenix Film Critics Society Awards	Best Live Action Family Film	Won
2009	ASCAP Film and Television Music Awards	Top Box Office Film (Andy Dodd, David Lawrence, Adam Anders, Antonina Armato, Matthew Gerrard, Robbie Nevil, Nikki Anders, Jamie Houston, Adam Watts, Theodore Thomas, Theron Thomas and Timothy Thomas)	Won
2009	BAFTA Awards	BAFTA Kids' Vote – Feature Film	Nominated
2009	Golden Reel Award	Best Sound Editing – Music in a Musical Feature Film (Tanya Noel Hill and Charles Martin Inouye)	Nominated
2009	Kermode Awards	Best Supporting Actress (Ashley Tisdale)	Won
2009	MTV Movie Awards	Best Male Performance (Zac Efron)	Won
2009	MTV Movie Awards	Breakthrough Performance Female (Ashley Tisdale)	Won
2009	MTV Movie Awards	Best Movie	Nominated
2009	MTV Movie Awards	Breakthrough Performance Female (Vanessa Hudgens)	Nominated
2009	MTV Movie Awards	Best Kiss (Vanessa Hudgens and Zac Efron)	Nominated
2009	National Association of Latino Independent Producers	Outstanding Achievement Award (Kenny Ortega)	Won
2009	Nickelodeon Kids' Choice Awards	Favorite Movie	Won
2009	Nickelodeon Kids' Choice Awards	Favorite Movie Actress (Vanessa Hudgens)	Won
2009	Nickelodeon Australian Kids' Choice Awards	Fave Movie Star (Zac Efron)	Nominated
2009	Teen Choice Awards	Choice Movie Actor: Music/Dance (Zac Efron)	Won
2009	Teen Choice Awards	Choice Movie: Music/Dance	Won
2009	Teen Choice Awards	Choice Movie Actress: Music/Dance (Vanessa Hudgens)	Nominated
2009	Teen Choice Awards	Choice Movie Actress: Music/Dance (Ashley Tisdale)	Nominated
2009	Teen Choice Awards	Choice Movie Liplock (Zac Efron and Vanessa Hudgens)	Nominated
2009	Teen Choice Awards	Choice Movie Actor: Music/Dance (Corbin Bleu)	Nominated
2009	Teen Choice Awards	Choice Music: Soundtrack (High School Musical 3: Senior Year soundtrack)	Nominated
2009	Young Artist Award	Jackie Coogan Award – Contribution to Youth (Kenny Ortega)	Won

== Home media ==
High School Musical 3: Senior Year was released in Region 1 DVD and Blu-ray on February 17, 2009, in Region 2 DVD on February 16, 2009 and in Region 3 DVD on February 24, 2009. The DVD was released in single and two-disc editions.

In Region 2, the single-disc edition DVD featured most of the two-disc edition bonus features such as bloopers, deleted scenes, extended version of the film, sing-along and cast goodbyes. In Region 3, only the single-disc edition DVD was released with all of the two-disc bonus features as well the extended edition of the film. In the Philippines, it was released on February 25, 2009. The Region 4 DVD was released on April 8, 2009. As of November 1, 2009, the DVD has sold over 23 million copies and generated over $200 million in sales revenue.

== Broadcasting ==
The film premiered on Disney Channel in the United States on April 4, 2010, before the series premiere of Good Luck Charlie. The premiere on Disney Channel brought 4 million viewers.

=== International releases ===
The film premiered in Russia/CIS, Romania, and Bulgaria on July 14, 2008 on Jetix Eastern Europe. The second premiere took place on December 18, 2011 on Disney Channel Russia. The film premiered on Disney Channel India on October 18, 2009, and on December 5, 2009 on Disney Channel Asia. On December 4, 2009, for one night only, it premiered on Disney Cinemagic and it premiered on Disney Channel in the United Kingdom and Ireland in January/February 2010. It premiered on December 12, 2009 on Disney Channel New Zealand/Australia and on March 16, 2011 on Disney Channel Latin America. It premiered in France on October 31, 2011 on M6.

== Future ==
=== Spin-off ===
A spin-off film, Sharpay's Fabulous Adventure (2011), was released direct-to-video and on television. Set one year after the events of Senior Year, it follows Sharpay Evans' life after graduation as she sets out to earn a place in a Broadway show.

=== Planned sequel ===
In early 2016, Disney announced that a fourth installment of the series was "in the works", later announcing a casting call for the film, tentatively referred to as High School Musical 4. In March 2016, details about the film's prospective principal characters were reported. However, the project ultimately did not enter development.

=== Television series adaptation ===
After a 9-year hiatus, a mockumentary series featuring a new cast, titled High School Musical: The Musical: The Series was announced in 2017, with its first episode premiering on ABC, Disney Channel, and Freeform on November 8, 2019, serving as a simulcast preview before its release on Disney+ on November 12. The series takes place in a fictionalized version of the real-life East High School, as they stage an adaptation of the first High School Musical film, although later seasons also feature songs from both the second and third film.
