= Jemma McKenzie-Brown =

English actress

- Born: 2 June 1994 (age 31); Beverley, East Riding of Yorkshire, England
- Occupation: Actress
- Years active: 2006–present

Jemma McKenzie-Brown (born 2 June 1994) is an English actress. She is known for her role as Tiara Gold in the 2008 film High School Musical 3: Senior Year.

== Life and career ==
Born in Beverley, East Riding of Yorkshire, she attended the Pamela Gray Dancing Academy in Hull. Having auditioned and subsequently gained a place at the Sylvia Young Theatre School, McKenzie-Brown relocated from Hull's Hymers College to lodge with a guest family in London, aged 11. As of 2010, McKenzie-Brown graduated from the Sylvia Young Theatre School.

Through the school's theatrical agency, McKenzie-Brown started to appear in various shows. In 2006, she made her debut playing Georgina Pritchard in the short television series The Amazing Mrs. Pritchard, portraying the daughter of Jane Horrocks' character. In 2008, she made a guest appearance on children's television series, M.I. High as Irene in the episode "Spy Plane". She then lent her voice to radio plays, including a production of the Arthur Ransome version of Old Peter's Russian Tales, and The Monstrous Mother.

In 2008, she took part in a closed audition in London and Los Angeles for the role of Tiara Gold in High School Musical 3: Senior Year. After gaining the role and filming in Salt Lake City, Utah, she generated much worldwide fame. On 14 September 2009, McKenzie-Brown stated she would not be returning in the fourth installment of High School Musical.

On 13 November 2020 McKenzie-Brown's band, About Bunny, released their debut single "Special".

== Filmography ==
Film and television
Year	Title	Role	Notes
2006	The Amazing Mrs Pritchard	Georgina Pritchard	Main role
2008	M.I. High	Irene Ryfield	Episode: "Spy Plane"
2008	High School Musical 3: Senior Year	Tiara Gold	
2016	All Killer	Bea Minicello	Short film
2016	Doctors	Becky Rintoul	Episode: "Field Day"
2017	Jack and Dean of All Trades	Receptionist	Episode: "Costumes"
2019	The Rook	Lizzie	Episode: "Chapter 2"

== Discography ==
=== Soundtrack albums ===
- 2008: High School Musical 3: Senior Year
