= High School Musical 3: Senior Year (soundtrack) =

2008 soundtrack album

Soundtrack album by High School Musical Cast
- Released: October 21, 2008
- Recorded: 2008
- Genres: Pop; teen pop; dance-pop; electropop; musical theatre
- Length: 51:15
- Label: Walt Disney

High School Musical chronology
High School Musical 2 (2007)	High School Musical 3: Senior Year (2008)	Sharpay's Fabulous Adventure (2011)

Singles from High School Musical 3: Senior Year
- 1. "Now or Never" Released: September 2, 2008; 2. "I Want It All" Released: September 9, 2008; 3. "A Night to Remember" Released: September 30, 2008; 4. "The Boys Are Back" Released: September 30, 2008; 5. "Right Here, Right Now" Released: October 14, 2008

High School Musical 3: Senior Year is the soundtrack to the 2008 Walt Disney Pictures film of the same name. It was released on October 21, 2008, in the United States.

== Album information ==
The album sold 297,000 copies in the first week of sales on United States, debuting at number 2 on Billboard 200, losing the top to AC/DC's Black Ice. The album sold over 1.3 million copies in the U.S. and 3,500,000 copies worldwide. In Australia, the soundtrack was accredited Gold on November 6 (within the first week of its release), and was certified Platinum on December 2 - before the film even opened in cinemas across Australia. In Brazil, the album sold more than 60,000 in pre-orders alone and was certified Platinum before the official release. It also sold 97,972 in its first week in the UK, making it the Fastest-Selling Soundtrack Album in the UK.

A two-disc Premiere Edition version of the soundtrack was released on the same day as the standard version. The two-disc soundtrack features the original soundtrack and a DVD with video bonus features. The Premiere Edition was released in a digipak format in selected countries. On October 15, 2008, the 12-track digital version was officially sold on EOLAsia.com in Hong Kong. On October 18, 2008, Radio Disney hosted the Planet Premiere of the original soundtrack and played it on the air in its entirety.

== Critical reception ==
Professional ratings
Review scores
Source	Rating
AllMusic	3/5 stars

The genius of the "High School Musical" machine becomes more apparent in its third installment—the first for the big screen. As seniors Troy (Zac Efron), Gabriella (Vanessa Hudgens) and Sharpay (Ashley Tisdale) graduate from fictitious East High, they also leave the franchise and attempt to repackage themselves as mainstream pop stars with wider demographic appeal. Meanwhile, new faces like British exchange student Tiara (Jemma McKenzie-Brown) start to sing and dance their way into the hearts of the faithful. The infinitely refreshable series has its musical formula down: Take "Rent"-style modern Broadway, add a kid-friendly dance beat with allusions to current pop, remove all hints of angst or lust. The result is another utopian vision of American teens, made for preteens. But the cast attacks the material with such sell-it-to-the-back-row spunk that anyone who likes a good show can't help but get a kick out of it.

— Billboard Magazine,

Lost in the shuffle of the ever-growing High School Musical phenomenon -- growing so big, it can no longer be contained on the Disney Channel, it's now reaching theaters for its third and final installment -- is that the tween-sensation is actually a musical. Which means that despite its pop trappings, the soundtracks consist of full-blown show tunes, songs that serve the story and are sung by the rotating cast. This helps make the movies work, but it sentences the soundtracks to be mere souvenirs of the event, a record for fans to play endlessly, not a means to crossover to a wider pop audience. On HSM3, there are only two songs that stand out as potential pop singles, both not so coincidentally solo showcases for the franchise's two biggest stars, Vanessa Hudgens and Zac Efron. Hudgens has the album's best song in the slickly soulful "Walk Away" -- a tune that would have shown up Wilson Phillips circa 1990 -- that she sings better than Efron, whose "Scream" struts like *NSYNC circa 2000. But both are upstaged by stage brat Ashley Tisdale, who shows far more on-record charisma on her fame-hungry showcase "I Want It All," a song that has absolutely no chance of making sense outside of the senior skip-day plot line of High School Musical 3, but Tisdale performs with ingratiating vigor, using every chop she's learned as a stage kid. Of course, those very strengths are well-suited for a musical like High School Musical 3, where the songs are vehicles for showboating performances either on the screen or in a fan's bedroom -- and for those fans, this set, which is similar in every way to its two predecessors, will not disappoint.

— Allmusic,

== Track listing ==
Standard edition
No.	Title	Writer(s)	Performer(s)	Length
1.	"Now or Never"	Matthew Gerrard; Robbie Nevil	Zac Efron, Vanessa Hudgens, Corbin Bleu, Chris Warren Jr., Ryne Sanborn	4:33
2.	"Right Here, Right Now"	Jamie Houston	Efron, Hudgens	3:58
3.	"I Want It All"	Matthew Gerrard; Robbie Nevil	Ashley Tisdale, Lucas Grabeel	4:39
4.	"Can I Have This Dance"	Adam Anders; Nikki Hassman	Efron, Hudgens	4:04
5.	"A Night to Remember"	Matthew Gerrard; Robbie Nevil	Efron, Hudgens, Tisdale, Grabeel, Bleu, Monique Coleman, Warren Jr., Olesya Rulin, Sanborn, Kaycee Stroh	3:58
6.	"Just Wanna Be with You"	Andy Dodd; Adam Watts	Grabeel, Rulin, Efron, Hudgens	2:38
7.	"The Boys Are Back"	Matthew Gerrard; Robbie Nevil	Efron, Bleu	3:47
8.	"Walk Away"	Jamie Houston	Hudgens	3:50
9.	"Scream"	Jamie Houston	Efron	3:56
10.	"Senior Year Spring Musical"	Randy Petersen; Kevin Quinn; Matthew Gerrard; Robbie Nevil; Andy Dodd; Adam Watts;	Efron, Hudgens, Tisdale, Grabeel, Bleu, Rulin, Sanborn, Warren Jr., Stroh, Matt Prokop, Jemma McKenzie-Brown	7:45
11.	"We're All in This Together" (Graduation Mix)	Matthew Gerrard; Robbie Nevil	Efron, Hudgens, Tisdale, Grabeel, Bleu, Coleman	4:17
12.	"High School Musical"	Matthew Gerrard; Robbie Nevil	Efron, Hudgens, Tisdale, Grabeel, Bleu, Coleman	3:53

=== 2-Disc Premiere edition ===
On the same day the soundtrack was released, Walt Disney Records released High School Musical 3: Senior Year 2-Disc Premiere Edition Soundtrack, a special two-disc set of the High School Musical 3: Senior Year soundtrack. It was only available for a limited time at participating stores (i.e. Target, Wal-Mart, Costco).

- Disc 1 - High School Musical 3: Senior Year Soundtrack
- Disc 2 - Bonus DVD with the following:
  - "Making of a Musical: From the Recording Studio to the Big Screen"
  - "Now or Never" Music Video
  - Official Movie Trailer
    (Running Time: 40 minutes)
- Special white package with special insert lyric booklet

=== Bonus tracks ===
No.	Title	Writer(s)	Recording artist(s)	Length
13.	"Just Getting Started" (Digital download bonus)	Jamie Houston	Stan Carrizosa	3:37
14.	"The Boys Are Back" (UK, Germany, Italy and Portugal bonus track)	Matthew Gerrard; Robbie Nevil	US5	3:30

On the iTunes Store in the United Kingdom, a new version of the soundtrack featuring remixes was released to coincide with the films DVD release.

No.	Title	Writer(s)	Recording artist(s)	Length
13.	"The Boys Are Back"	Matthew Gerrard; Robbie Nevil	US5	3:37
14.	"Just Getting Started" (Digital download bonus)	Jamie Houston	Stan Carrizosa	3:37
15.	"Now or Never" (Remix)	Matthew Gerrard; Robbie Nevil	Efron, Hudgens, Bleu, Warren Jr., Sanborn	4:58
16.	"The Boys Are Back" (Remix)	Matthew Gerrard; Robbie Nevil	US5	3:38
17.	"High School Musical 3 Megamix"	Matthew Gerrard; Robbie Nevil	Efron, Hudgens, Tisdale, Grabeel, Bleu, Coleman	7:02

== Singles ==
Multiple singles were released prior the release of the soundtrack album, with the song being released on digital stores and the music video being played on Disney Channel.

"Now or Never" was the first single released from the soundtrack and is performed by the Cast of High School Musical 3: Senior Year.

"I Want It All" was the second single released from the soundtrack and is performed by Ashley Tisdale and Lucas Grabeel as Sharpay Evans and Ryan Evans.

"A Night to Remember" was the third single released from the soundtrack and is performed by the cast of High School Musical 3: Senior Year.

"Right Here Right Now" was the fourth single released from the soundtrack and is performed by Zac Efron and Vanessa Hudgens as Troy Bolton and Gabriella Montez.

"The Boys Are Back" is a song by Troy Bolton (Zac Efron) and Chad Danforth (Corbin Bleu). The video shows that the member were wearing hoodies of the movies' basketball team. The video shows when the group sings and dances, there were scenes of the movie appearing in the video.

== Charts performance ==
The album sold 297,000 copies in its first week in the United States, debuting at number 2 on Billboard 200. It has currently sold over 1 million copies in the U.S. In Australia, the soundtrack was accredited Gold on 6 November (within the first week of its release) but in Portugal, the soundtrack was accredited Platinum. The album had sold 3,500,000 copies worldwide as of March 2, 2010.

== Charts ==
=== Weekly charts ===
Chart (2008)	Peak position
Australian Albums (ARIA)	4
Austrian Albums (Ö3 Austria)	1
Belgian Albums (Ultratop Flanders)	6
Belgian Albums (Ultratop Wallonia)	7
Canadian Albums (Billboard)	2
Danish Albums (Hitlisten)	7
Dutch Albums (Album Top 100)	32
Finnish Albums (Suomen virallinen lista)	23
French Albums (SNEP)	6
German Albums (Offizielle Top 100)	3
Greek Albums (IFPI)	3
Hungarian Albums (MAHASZ)	1
Irish Multi-Artist Albums Chart	1
Italian Compilations Albums (FIMI)	1
Mexican Albums (AMPROFON)	1
New Zealand Albums (RMNZ)	1
Norwegian Albums (VG-lista)	6
Portuguese Albums (AFP)	3
Spanish Albums (Promusicae)	1
Polish Albums (ZPAV)	2
Swiss Albums (Schweizer Hitparade)	6
Turkey Albums Chart	1
UK Compilation Albums (OCC)	1
US Billboard 200	2
US Soundtrack Albums (Billboard)	1

=== Year-end charts ===
Chart (2008)	Position
Australian Albums (ARIA)	18
Austrian Albums (Ö3 Austria)	17
Belgian Albums (Ultratop Flanders)	59
Belgian Albums (Ultratop Wallonia)	85
Brazil Albums (ABPD)	14
French Albums (SNEP)	75
German Albums (Offizielle Top 100)	48
Mexican Albums (AMPROFON)	87
New Zealand Albums (RMNZ)	17
Swiss Albums (Schweizer Hitparade)	68
US Billboard 200	54
US Soundtrack Albums (Billboard)	7

Chart (2009)	Position
Canadian Albums (Billboard)	31
US Billboard 200	30
US Soundtrack Albums (Billboard)	3

== Certifications and sales ==
Certifications and sales for High School Musical 3: Senior Year
Region	Certification	Certified units/sales
Argentina (CAPIF)	Gold	20,000^{^}
Australia (ARIA)	Platinum	70,000^{^}
Austria (IFPI Austria)	Gold	10,000^{*}
Belgium (BRMA)	Platinum	30,000^{*}
Brazil (Pro-Música Brasil)	2× Platinum	120,000^{*}
Canada (Music Canada)	2× Platinum	160,000^{‡}
Ecuador	—	10,000
Finland (Musiikkituottajat)	Gold	12,590
France (SNEP)	Platinum	100,000^{*}
GCC (IFPI Middle East)	3× Platinum	18,000^{*}
Germany (BVMI)	Platinum	200,000^{^}
Hungary (MAHASZ)	Platinum	6,000^{^}
Ireland (IRMA)	2× Platinum	30,000^{^}
Italy	—	120,000
Mexico (AMPROFON)	3× Platinum	240,000^{^}
New Zealand (RMNZ)	2× Platinum	30,000^{^}
Portugal (AFP)	Gold	10,000^{^}
Spain (Promusicae)	Platinum	80,000^{^}
Switzerland (IFPI Switzerland)	Gold	15,000^{^}
Turkey (Mü-Yap)	Gold	5,000^{*}
United Kingdom (BPI)	Platinum	300,000^{^}
United States (RIAA)	Platinum	1,500,000
^{*} Sales figures based on certification alone.^{^} Shipments figures based on certification alone.^{‡} Sales+streaming figures based on certification alone.

== International versions ==
International versions with foreign language lyrics have been released in various countries for the original single Right Here, Right Now, as well as international versions of "Just Wanna Be With You", "Scream", and "Walk Away". International versions of the entire album were produced in India, Turkey and Russia.

Song	Original Name	Language	Singer(s)	Country
"Ty i Ja"	"Right Here, Right Now"	Polish	Hania Stach & Łukasz Zagrobelny	Poland
"Just Här, Just Nu"	"Right Here, Right Now"	Swedish	Brandur & Molly Sandén	Sweden
"Lige Her Og Nu"	"Right Here, Right Now"	Danish	Simon Mathew & Rebekka Mathew	Denmark
"Μικροί θεοί" (Mikroí Theoí)	"Right Here, Right Now"	Greek	Kostas Martakis & Shaya	Greece
"Itt És Most"	"Right Here, Right Now"	Hungarian	Dósa Mátyás & Széles Izabella	Hungary
"Chiar Aici, Chiar Acum"	"Right Here, Right Now"	Romanian	Cătălin Josan & Giulia	Romania
"Eu Só Quero Estar Com Você"	"Just Wanna Be With You"	Portuguese	Olavo Cavalheiro & Renata Ferreira (High School Musical: A Seleção)	Brazil
"Yo Contigo Quiero Estar"	"Just Wanna Be With You"	Spanish	Mariana & Cristobal (High School Musical: El Desafío)	Mexico
"Yo Contigo Quiero Estar"	"Just Wanna Be With You"	Spanish	Fernando & Agustina (High School Musical: El Desafío)	Argentina
"Grido"	"Scream"	Italian	Jacopo Sarno	Italy
"Vivre Ma Vie"	"Walk Away"	French	Amel Bent	France

=== Hindi versions ===
Hindi title	Original title	Performer(s)
"Now or Never"	"Now or Never"	High School Musical 3: Senior Year Hindi cast
"Right Here, Right Now"	"Right Here, Right Now"	Wrisha Dutta and Sangeet Haldipur
"I Want It All"	"I Want It All"	High School Musical 3: Senior Year Hindi cast
"Can I Have This Dance"	"Can I Have This Dance"	Wrisha Dutta and Sangeet Haldipur
"A Night to Remember"	"A Night to Remember"	High School Musical 3: Senior Year Hindi cast
"Just Wanna Be with You"	"Just Wanna Be with You"	Wrisha Dutta and Sangeet Haldipur
"The Boys Are Back"	"The Boys Are Back"	Unknown
"Walk Away"	"Walk Away"	Wrisha Dutta
"Scream"	"Scream"	Sangeet Haldipur
"Senior Year Spring Musical"	"Senior Year Spring Musical"	High School Musical 3: Senior Year Hindi cast
"We're All in This Together (Graduation Mix)"	"We're All in This Together (Graduation Mix)"	High School Musical 3: Senior Year Hindi cast
"High School Musical"	"High School Musical"	High School Musical 3: Senior Year Hindi cast

== Personnel ==
The following people contributed to the album:

- Vocals – Zac Efron, Vanessa Hudgens, Ashley Tisdale, Lucas Grabeel, Corbin Bleu, Monique Coleman, Olesya Rulin, Jemma McKenzie-Brown, Matt Prokop
- Executive Producers – Kenny Ortega, Bill Borden and Barry Rosenbush
- Producers – Adam Anders, Rasmus Billie Bähncke, Andy Dodd, Matthew Gerrard, Jamie Houston, Randy Petersen, Kevin Quinn, Adam Watts
- Lyricists - Adam Anders, Andy Dodd, Matthew Gerrard, Nikki Hassman, Jamie Houston, Robbie Nevil, Randy Petersen, Kevin Quinn, Adam Watts
- Mastering – Patricia Sullivan
- Engineers – Cary Butler, Matthew Gerrard, Jamie Houston, Jeremy Luzier, Joseph Magee, Brian Matouf, Joel Soyffer

== See also ==
- High School Musical
- High School Musical 2
- High School Musical 3: Senior Year
- High School Musical: El desafio (Argentina)
