= Stick to the Status Quo =

Song by High School Musical cast

from the album High School Musical
- Recorded: 2005
- Genre: Pop
- Length: 4:28
- Label: Walt Disney
- Songwriters: David Lawrence and Faye Greenberg
- Producer: Faye Greenberg

"Stick to the Status Quo" is a song from the Disney Channel Original Movie High School Musical. The song also appears on the soundtrack by the same name. It is sung by the minor cast of High School Musical after it is discovered that Troy Bolton, the protagonist of the film and captain of the school's varsity basketball team, auditioned for the winter musical Twinkle Towne. The song was also included in performances of High School Musical: The Concert, and its live album (2007). The song expresses frustration at the social hierarchy known as cliques for not allowing individuals from different cliques to interact or share interests, therefore the characters' verses challenge the status quo while the song's refrain defends it.

== Charts and certifications ==
=== Weekly charts ===
Chart (2006–2007)	Peak position
Italy (FIMI)	50
UK Singles (Official Charts)	74
US Billboard Hot 100	43
US Pop 100 (Billboard)	37

== Certifications ==
Region	Certification	Certified units/sales
United States (RIAA)	Gold	500,000^{*}
^{*} Sales figures based on certification alone.
