= Now or Never (High School Musical song) =

Single by High School Musical 3 cast

from the album High School Musical 3: Senior Year
- Released: September 2, 2008
- Recorded: 2008
- Genre: Dance-pop
- Length: 4:25 (album version); 3:24 (radio edit)
- Label: Walt Disney, Capitol, Arista
- Songwriters: Matthew Gerrard and Robbie Nevil
- Producers: Matthew Gerrard, Switch

High School Musical singles chronology
"Bet on It" (2007)	"Now or Never" (2008)	"I Want It All" (2008)

"Now or Never" is the opening musical number and first single from the Walt Disney Pictures film, High School Musical 3: Senior Year. The song is also the first track of the movie's soundtrack. However, when the song is performed in the movie, the first verse is omitted.

== Release ==
The song had its world premiere on Radio Disney on July 11, 2008 as part of its Planet Premiere featurette. An extended version of the song was released on September 2, 2008 on the iTunes Store as the first official single from the soundtrack. A preview of its use in the movie, along with clips of the movie premiered on Disney Channel on July 30, 2008. On Sunday July 20, 2008, the song premiered in the UK on BBC Radio One as part of BBC Switch.. Only Zac Efron, Vanessa Hudgens, and Corbin Bleu sing in the music but it is credited as sung by the Cast of High School Musical 3: Senior Year.

== Music video ==
A preview of the movie's scene (considered as the official music video) premiered on Disney Channel on July 30, 2008. "Now or Never" is the opening number of the film that takes place during the West High Knights and East High Wildcats State Championship basketball game. The scene begins in the boys' locker room and transitions itself into the gym where the game is taking place. The song ends as the winning shot is made.

== Formats and track listings ==
Formats

1. "Now or Never" (Album Version) — 4:26
2. "Now or Never" (Radio Disney Edit) — 3:24
3. "Now or Never" (Video Edit) — 1:31
4. "Now or Never" (Reprise version - as part of "Senior Year Spring Musical") — 0:56

iTunes digital single track listing

== Charts ==
Chart (2008)	Peak position
Australia (ARIA)	62
Canada (Canadian Hot 100)	72
Denmark (Tracklisten)	18
Ireland (IRMA)	42
Italy (FIMI)	29
Switzerland (Schweizer Hitparade)	64
UK Singles (OCC)	41
US Billboard Hot 100	68

== Certifications ==
Region	Certification	Certified units/sales
United States (RIAA)	Gold	500,000^{‡}
^{‡} Sales+streaming figures based on certification alone.
