= A Night to Remember (High School Musical song) =

Single by High School Musical 3 cast

from the album High School Musical 3: Senior Year
- Released: September 30, 2008
- Recorded: 2008
- Genre: Dance-pop, teen pop
- Length: 3:58
- Label: Walt Disney
- Songwriters: Matthew Gerrard; Robbie Nevil; David Lawrence; Faye Greenberg
- Producer: Matthew Gerrard

High School Musical singles chronology
"I Want It All" (2008)	"A Night to Remember" (2008)	"The Boys Are Back" (2008)

"A Night to Remember" is the third official single from the High School Musical 3: Senior Year soundtrack, performed by the cast of the movie. It is the fifth track on the album.

== Release ==
The Radio Edit version of the song premiered on Radio Disney on September 26, 2008 as part of its Planet Premiere featurette. The song was released later exclusively on iTunes, on September 30. This is the only song from the soundtrack performed by the full Cast of the movie, not only for the primary Cast.

== Music video ==
A preview of movie scene (credited as the official music video for the song) premiered on Disney Channel during the world premiere of The Suite Life on Deck on September 26, 2008. The music video features the boys complaining about prom and the girls hoping that the night will be a night to remember. Then the whole cast ends up dancing at prom.

== Formats and track listings ==
Formats

1. "A Night to Remember" (Album Version) — 3:58
2. "A Night to Remember" (Ashley Tisdale and Jemma McKenzie-Brown version - as part of "Senior Year Spring Musical") — 1:03
3. "A Night to Remember" (Video Edit) — 1:20

iTunes digital single track listing

1. "A Night to Remember" (Album Version) — 3:58

== Charts ==
Chart (2008)	Peak position
Australia (ARIA)	96
UK Singles (OCC)	94
US Bubbling Under Hot 100 (Billboard)	8
