= Right Here, Right Now (High School Musical song) =

Single by Zac Efron and Vanessa Hudgens

from the album High School Musical 3: Senior Year
- Released: October 14, 2008
- Recorded: 2008
- Genre: Pop, teen pop, soundtrack
- Length: 3:58
- Label: Walt Disney
- Songwriter: Jamie Houston
- Producer: Jamie Houston

High School Musical singles chronology
"The Boys Are Back" (2008)	"Right Here, Right Now" (2008)

Zac Efron singles chronology
"Bet on It" (2007)	"Right Here, Right Now" (2008)	"Rewrite the Stars" (2018)

Vanessa Hudgens singles chronology
"Sneakernight" (2008)	"Right Here, Right Now" (2008)	"Reminding Me" (2017)

"Right Here, Right Now" is a song from the High School Musical 3: Senior Year soundtrack, performed by Zac Efron and Vanessa Hudgens as Troy Bolton and Gabriella Montez. Written and produced by songwriter Jamie Houston, it is the second track on soundtrack's track listing. When the song is sung in the movie, Troy and Gabriella only sing the first verse, second and third chorus, and the bridge whereas the first chorus and second verse are omitted. However, in the extended edition of the film, the second verse is sung later as the reprise when Troy and Gabriella are at their homes.

== Release ==
The Radio Edit version of the song premiered on Radio Disney on October 10, 2008 as part of its Planet Premiere featurette. It reached #2 on the Top 30 Countdown, where it stayed for 6 weeks. The song was released later exclusively on iTunes, on October 14.

== Different versions ==
There are actually multiple different recordings of this song, between the one released on the soundtrack and the versions featured in the movie. It is unknown why there are different versions are used in the movie and on the soundtrack.

In the movie, during the first time this song is played, Hudgens sings the line "Then, I would thank that star, that made our wish come true," and she sings with Efron in some parts of the "‘cause he knows that where you are, is where I should be too" line in the first verse and the "It’s always you and me" line in the bridge. However, on the soundtrack, Efron sings these lines by himself, with Hudgens providing background vocals during these parts in the song.

On the reprise, which is found only during the extended version of the movie, the background music from the beginning of the song is used while the soundtrack version uses a continuing music track for the second verse. Efron sings the "If this were forever, what could be better? We’ve already proved it works" line in the reprise while Vanessa sings it on the soundtrack. This performance is also lyrically simpler compared to the soundtrack version, as there are not as many moments with background vocals during the second verse.

== Music video ==
A preview of the movie scene (credited as the official music video) was released on Disney Channel. It shows Troy and Gabriella singing and remembering some of their special moments in Troy's treehouse. It is a song about how the future is coming soon and that people should make every second last and enjoy what's happening right now.

== Formats and track listings ==
Digital download

1. "Right Here, Right Now" (Album Version) — 3:55

== Charts ==
=== Weekly charts ===
Chart (2008)	Peak position
Germany (GfK)	92
UK Singles (OCC)	137
US Bubbling Under Hot 100 (Billboard)	19

== Foreign-language versions ==
The song has been recorded and released in various languages by national pop stars in international markets.

Language	Title	Singers	Country
Danish	"Lige Her Og Nu"	Simon Mathew & Rebekka Mathew	Denmark
Greek	"Μικροί θεοί" (Mikroí Theoí)	Kostas Martakis & Shaya	Greece
Hungarian	"Itt És Most"	Dósa Mátyás & Széles Izabella	Hungary
Italian	"Voglio Te, Accanto a Me"	Ambra LoFaro & Jacopo Sarno	Italy
Polish	"Ty i Ja"	Hania Stach & Łukasz Zagrobelny	Poland
Romanian	"Chiar Aici, Chiar Acum"	Cătălin Josan & Giulia	Romania
Russian	"Наш мир"	Sergey Lazarev & Ksenya Larina	Russia
Swedish	"Just Här, Just Nu"	Brandur & Molly Sandén	Sweden
