= Ryne Sanborn =

American actor (born 1989)

- Born: Ryne Andrew Sanborn; February 3, 1989 (age 37); Salt Lake City, Utah, U.S.
- Other name: Ryno
- Occupation: Ice hockey player
- Years active: 1997–2008 (acting)

Ryne Andrew Sanborn (born February 3, 1989) is an American ice hockey player and former actor. He is best known for his role as Jason Cross in the High School Musical films. Sanborn plays ice hockey for the Utah Outliers.

== Early life, family and education ==
Sanborn was born in Salt Lake City, Utah. He attended Taylorsville High School in Taylorsville, Utah, and played for the school hockey team as well as for the under-16 Utah Stars team.

In 2008, he retired from acting to study architecture at University of Utah.

== Career ==
=== Modeling and acting ===
Sanborn began modeling when he was two years old. He co-starred in the 1997 TV movie Not in This Town at age seven. Following this, he received guest roles on Touched by an Angel (1998) and Everwood (2003). In 2002, Sanborn portrayed the main "Child of Light" in the opening and closing ceremonies of the Salt Lake Winter Olympics.

Sanborn is best known for playing the role of Jason Cross, a member of the East High School boys' varsity basketball team, in High School Musical, High School Musical 2 and High School Musical 3: Senior Year. Sanborn also appeared in the independent movie The Adventures of Food Boy.

=== Ice hockey ===
As of 2012, he played ice hockey for Utah Outliers.

== Filmography ==
Actor
Year	Film	Role	Notes
1997	Not in This Town	Stephen	Television film
1998	Touched by an Angel	Jimmy	Episode: "The Wind Beneath My Wings"
2003	Everwood	Young Colin Hart	Episode: "The Miracle of Everwood"
2006	High School Musical	Jason Cross	Television film
2007	High School Musical 2	Jason Cross	Television film
2008	The Adventures of Food Boy	Mike	
2008	High School Musical 3: Senior Year	Jason Cross	
