= I Want It All (High School Musical song) =

Single by Ashley Tisdale and Lucas Grabeel

from the album High School Musical 3: Senior Year
- Released: September 9, 2008
- Recorded: 2008
- Genre: Dance-pop
- Length: 4:37 (album version); 3:40 (radio edit)
- Label: Walt Disney
- Songwriters: Matthew Gerrard, Robbie Nevil
- Producer: Matthew Gerrard

High School Musical singles chronology
| "Now or Never" (2008) | "I Want It All" (2008) | "A Night to Remember" (2008) |

Ashley Tisdale singles chronology
| "Suddenly" (2008) | "I Want It All" (2008) | "It's Alright, It's OK" (2009) |

"I Want It All" is the second single from the Walt Disney Pictures film, High School Musical 3: Senior Year, and is the third track on the High School Musical 3 soundtrack. The song is performed by Ashley Tisdale and Lucas Grabeel as Sharpay Evans and Ryan Evans.

== Song information ==
The Radio Edit version of the song premiered on Radio Disney on August 15, 2008, as part of its Planet Premiere featurette. An extended version of the song was released on iTunes on September 9, 2008, available to digital download. The song is currently playing only on Radio Disney, reaching number 1 on radio's weekly countdown. The song and eleven other songs from the High School Musical 3 soundtrack were pre-nominated in the "Best Original Song" category for The 81st Academy Awards. The final nominations were announced on January 22, 2009, and not any of the songs from the soundtrack got a nomination., but according to Billboard, the song should have been nominated. The song was used as background music in Britain's Got Talent (series 3) auditions.

== Music videos ==
Ashley Tisdale as Sharpay with Lucas Grabeel as Ryan in the music video.

Two previews of the movie scene (credited as the two official music videos of the song) premiered on Disney Channel during the world premiere of The Cheetah Girls: One World, on August 22, 2008. Both feature Sharpay and Ryan singing and dancing about fame and glamour, but playing different parts of the song. The third preview of the movie scene was released on October 17, 2008. It plays another part of the song and shows brand new scenes with Sharpay and Ryan being superstars and a special appearance by Zac Efron.

== Track listings ==
| No. | Title | Length |
|---|---|---|
| 1. | "I Want It All" (Album version) | 4:37 |
| 2. | "I Want It All" (Radio Disney edit) | 3:40 |
| 3. | "I Want It All" (Video edit) | 1:31 |
| 4. | "I Want It All" (Lucas Grabeel solo) | 0:50 |

== Chart performance ==
I Want It All stayed for four weeks on the Bubbling Under Hot 100 Singles chart and never entered on Billboard Hot 100. It also debuted on #3 on Hot 100 Singles Sales chart but fell out on the next week. Outside from the U.S., the song debuted on #75 on Canadian Hot Digital Songs chart but didn't enter on the official chart. Also, debuted on #87 on UK Singles Chart.

=== Charts ===
| Chart (2008) | Peak position |
|---|---|
| Australia (ARIA) | 93 |
| Canadian Digital Song Sales (Billboard) | 75 |
| UK Singles (Official Charts) | 87 |
| US Bubbling Under Hot 100 (Billboard) | 13 |
