= Lucas Grabeel =

American actor (born 1984)

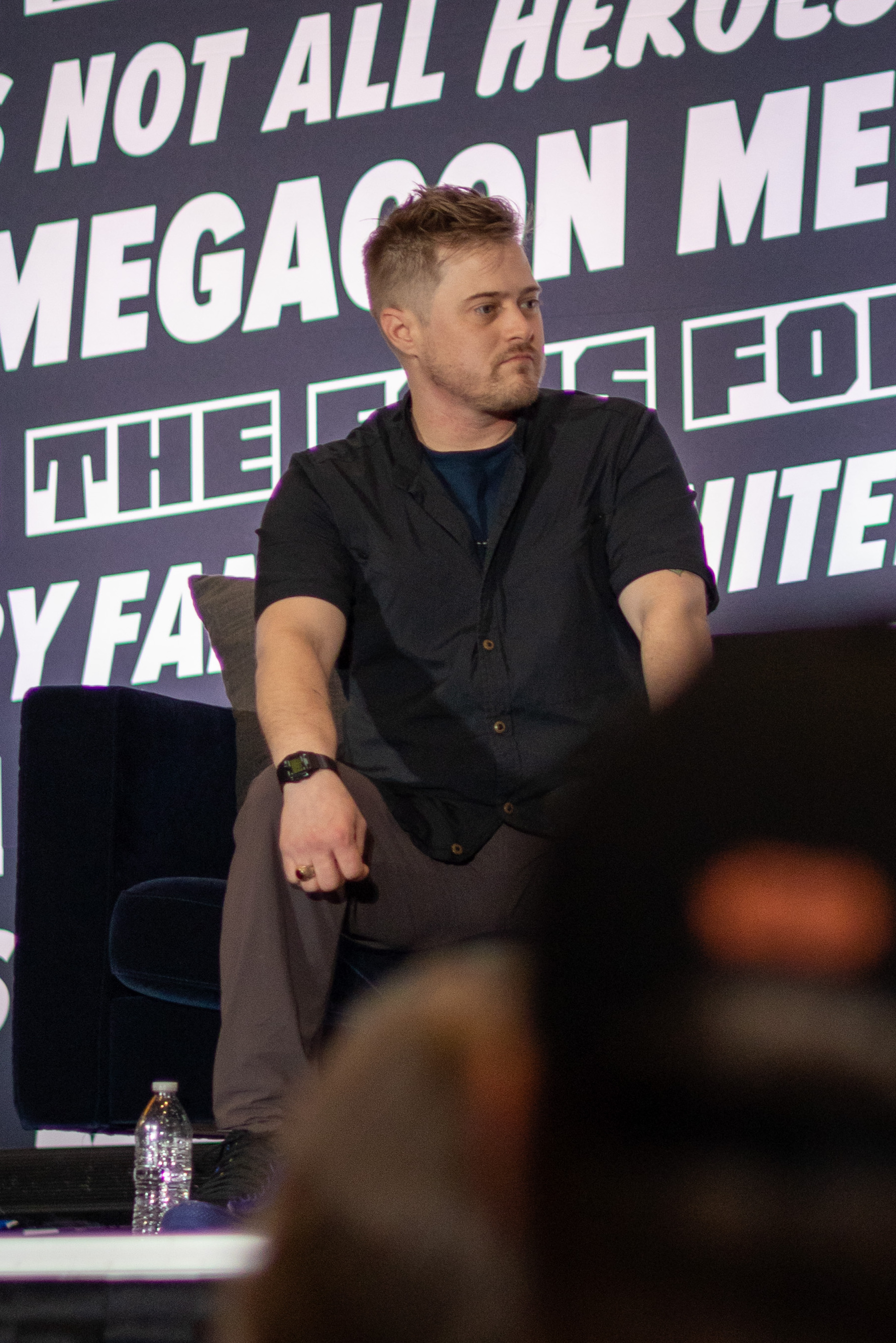
- Grabeel in 2025
- Born: Lucas Stephen Grabeel; November 23, 1984 (age 41); Springfield, Missouri, U.S.
- Occupations: Actor; musician; singer
- Years active: 2004–present
- Musical career
- Origin: Rogersville, Missouri, U.S.
- Genres: Pop; dance-pop
- Instruments: Vocals; guitar; piano
- Label: Road Dawg Records

Lucas Stephen Grabeel (/ˈɡreɪbiːl/ GRAY-beel; born November 23, 1984) is an American actor and musician. He began his career playing Ethan Dalloway in the Disney Channel films Halloweentown High (2004) and Return to Halloweentown (2006), before gaining recognition for his role as Ryan Evans in the High School Musical film series (2006–2011).

Grabeel's other film credits include Alice Upside Down (2007), The Adventures of Food Boy and Milk (both 2008). He appeared as a young Lex Luthor and Conner Kent in the superhero television series Smallville (2006–2011). In 2011, Grabeel released his debut extended play, Sunshine, and began playing Toby Kennish in the ABC Freeform drama series Switched at Birth, appearing until 2017.

Grabeel has also provided voice acting roles for various animated series, including Deputy Peck in Disney Junior's Sheriff Callie's Wild West (2014–2017), the title character in Netflix's Pinky Malinky (2019), Kyle/Mist in My Adventures with Superman (2023), and various roles in Family Guy (2010–2021).

== Early life ==
Grabeel was born in Springfield, Missouri, on November 23, 1984, the son of Jean (née Harman) and Stephen Grabeel. Before transferring to and graduating from Kickapoo High School in Springfield in 2003, he attended Logan-Rogersville Elementary, Middle and High School. He also played drums for a local church and initiated a men's a cappella singing group at Kickapoo called No Treble. At school, he found passions in the guitar and the accordion while also enjoying dance. While in Rogersville, Missouri, he regularly attended Harmony Baptist Church, where he was a part of the children's and youth groups.

== Career ==
=== 2004–08: Beginning and High School Musical ===
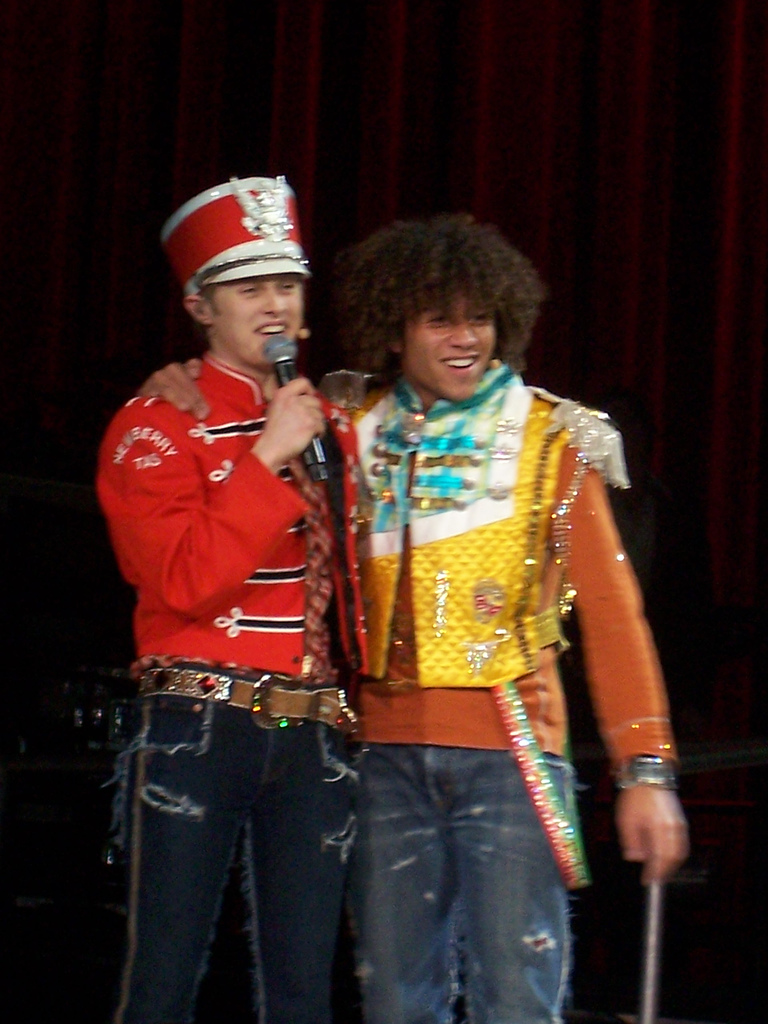
Grabeel (left) and Corbin Bleu (right) in High School Musical: The Concert, in 2007

In 2004, he starred in his first film role as Ethan Dolloway in the third installment of the Halloweentown series Halloweentown High. He reprised this role in the series' fourth installment Return to Halloweentown. Grabeel has made television guest appearances in TV series such as Boston Legal, 'Til Death, and Veronica Mars. During these stints, Grabeel also worked a day job as a Blockbuster store clerk.

In 2006, he was cast in the role of Ryan Evans, the fraternal twin brother of Sharpay Evans (played by Ashley Tisdale), in the Disney film High School Musical. He reprised his role in the television sequels High School Musical 2 and High School Musical 3: Senior Year. In 2007, he joined co-stars Vanessa Hudgens, Ashley Tisdale, Corbin Bleu and Monique Coleman on the 51-date High School Musical: The Concert. In early 2009, Billboard believed that Grabeel and Tisdale's track "I Want It All" should be nominated for an Oscar in the Best Original Song category however, the song did not make the final shortlist. During his time in High School Musical, Grabeel (along with his co-stars) had a total of six tracks chart in the Billboard Hot 100.

He (along with co-stars Efron and Tisdale) became one of the first artists to debut in the Billboard Hot 100 with two simultaneous new entries in one week. While with Disney Channel, Grabeel also participated in the first ever Disney Channel Games and co-captained the green team along with Ashley Tisdale, Mitchel Musso, Miley Cyrus, Emily Osment and Kyle Massey. A year later, he returned to repeat his captaincy of the green team with Dylan Sprouse, Miley Cyrus, Monique Coleman and Brandon Baker. Other film projects Grabeel was involved with include the animated film, At Jesus' Side, where he voiced a dog named Jericho. He also filmed the independent film, Alice Upside Down, as the character of Lester McKinley, based on the "Alice book series" by Phyllis Reynolds Naylor. Aside his involvement in the High School Musical soundtracks, Grabeel has recorded a song called "You Know I Will" for the soundtrack of The Fox and the Hound 2 and also recorded his own version of the Michael Bolton track "Go the Distance", from Disney's Hercules, for DisneyMania 5.

In 2007, Grabeel co-wrote and recorded a song called "You Got It" which was released in the iTunes Store on August 19, 2007, while its accompanying music video was released on his official website. Grabeel also recorded another original song called "Trash Talkin'" which was released November 15, 2008, on YouTube. In 2008, he also appeared in the film Milk, a biopic about the slain gay rights activist Harvey Milk. Grabeel played a friend and supporter of Milk, photographer Danny Nicoletta. He also appeared in the 2008 Walt Disney Pictures film College Road Trip as Scooter, which features other Disney stars Raven-Symoné, Brenda Song, and Margo Harshman. He also stars in the independent film Lock and Roll Forever alongside Oreskaband. Grabeel also guest starred in an episode of The Cleveland Show.

=== 2009–present: Switched at Birth and other projects ===
Early in 2009, Grabeel was voted Most Likely to Do Big Things in 2009 by MTV and had an exclusive interview with them. He mentions the release of another music video for his track Get Your Ass On. He also mentioned his latest film project, Dancing Ninja, where he played the lead Tokyo Jones alongside David Hasselhoff. In May 2009, he portrayed the role on stage of Matt in the Harvey Schmidt and Tom Jones musical, The Fantasticks with Eric McCormack and Harry Groener at UCLA's Freud Playhouse. Grabeel also sings in the iTunes show I Kissed a Vampire, in which, he stars. In early 2009, he appeared at the Southland Theatre Artists Goodwill Event (S.T.A.G.E.), an AIDS charity event, in Beverly Hills performing George and Ira Gershwin's "I Can't Be Bothered Now". He also recorded and released a new track titled '135n8' in early 2014 with the music video being uploaded to his YouTube account.

In 2011, Grabeel appeared in the tenth season of Smallville as young Lex Luthor as well as Conner Kent, a hybrid clone of Luthor and Clark Kent. In 2007, he filmed the film The Adventures of Food Boy with Brittany Curran, as the lead, Ezra Chase. From 2011 to 2017, Grabeel starred in the ABC Family drama Switched at Birth, in which he played the brother of one of the two girls that were mistakenly switched at birth in the hospital. In March 2012, I Kissed A Vampire was released in the US, where Lucas stars alongside Drew Seeley and Adrian Slade. In January 2014 he provided his first-ever voice over role for an animated series, Deputy Peck on Sheriff Callie's Wild West. He has also played the character of Gustav in Dragons: Defenders of Berk. In 2019, Grabeel appeared in High School Musical: The Musical: The Series as himself.

== Other ventures ==
In 2007, Grabeel founded a production company called 14341 Productions. His role within involves overseeing many projects from writing to directing and executive producing. The company has produced projects such as the short films The Real Son, Smoke Break; the music videos for "Get Your Ass On" and "You Got It". They produced a television pilot called Regarding Beauregard which was Grabeel's directorial debut. They also created a 17-minute short film, Chuckle Boy, as well as a short film called The Dragon in 2009. Their work debuted at the 2009 Sundance Film Festival.

== Filmography ==
=== Film ===
Year	Title	Role	Notes
2005	Dogg's Hamlet, Cahoot's Macbeth	Charlie / Gertrude / Ophelia	
2007	Alice Upside Down	Lester McKinley	
2008	The Real Son	Freddie Deasnman	Short film
2008	Smoke Break	Sir Anthony Childsworth	Short film
2008	At Jesus' Side	Jericho (voice)	
2008	Lock and Roll Forever	Donni	
2008	High School Musical 3: Senior Year	Ryan Evans	
2008	College Road Trip	Scooter	
2008	The Adventures of Food Boy	Ezra Chase	
2008	Milk	Danny Nicoletta	
2009	Chuckle Boy	Daniel Aranyo	Short film
2010	Dancing Ninja	Nikki	
2012	I Kissed a Vampire	Dylan Knight	
2013	Chocolate Milk	Stan	Short film
2014	Dragon Nest: Warriors' Dawn	Gerrant (voice)	
2014	Pilot Season	Luc	Short film
2018	Little Women	Laurie Lawrence	
2023	Max & Me	Jessie (voice)	

=== Television ===
Year	Title	Role	Notes
2004	Halloweentown High	Ethan Dalloway	Television film
2005	Boston Legal	Jason Matheny	Episode: "The Ass Fat Jungle"
2006–2011	Smallville	Young Lex Luthor, Superboy	3 episodes
2005–2006	Veronica Mars	Wanna Score Boy / Kelly Kuzzio	2 episodes
2006	Return to Halloweentown	Ethan Dalloway	Television film
2006	'Til Death	Pete Pratt	Episode: "Pilot"
2006	High School Musical	Ryan Evans	Television film
2007	High School Musical 2	Ryan Evans	Television film
2009	Glenn Martin DDS	Singer (voice)	Episode: "Deck the Malls"
2009	I Kissed a Vampire	Dylan	Main role
2010	The Cleveland Show	Nerd #2 (voice)	Episode: "Love Rollercoaster"
2010	CSI: Crime Scene Investigation	Guillermo Seidel	Episode: "Field Mice"
2010–present	Family Guy	Chadley / Various characters (voice)	24 episodes
2011	Sharpay's Fabulous Adventure	Ryan Evans	Television film
2011	Special Agent Oso	Uncle Eric (voice)	Episode: "Snapfingers"
2011–2017	Switched at Birth	Toby Kennish	Main role
2012	Robot Chicken	Justin Bieber (voice)	Episode: "Robot Chicken's ATM Christmas Special"
2013–2018	DreamWorks Dragons	Gustav (voice)	12 episodes
2013	Pound Puppies	Percy (voice)	Episode: "Cuddle Up Buttercup"
2014–2017	Sheriff Callie's Wild West	Deputy Peck (voice)	Main cast
2014	Phineas and Ferb	Ropey-Face (voice)	Episode: "Doof 101"
2014	Chopped	Himself	Episode: "Chopped Tournament of Stars: Actors"
2015	Doraemon	Big G (voice)	Episode: "Big G's Big Show"
2016	High School Musical: 10th Anniversary	Himself	Special
2016–2019	Elena of Avalor	Jiku (voice)	6 episodes
2017–2018	Spirit Riding Free	Julian (voice)	6 episodes
2019	Pinky Malinky	Pinky Malinky, additional voices	Main role
2019, 2023	High School Musical: The Musical: The Series	Himself	2 episodes
2020	The Disney Family Singalong	Himself	Special
2022	Spirit Rangers	Chad (voice)	Episode: "Not Your Opossum Mascot"
2023	My Adventures with Superman	Kyle / Mist, additional voices	2 episodes
2026	Submarine Jim	Jim (voice)	Main role

== Discography ==
=== Extended play ===
Title	EP details
Sunshine	Released: June 22, 2011; Formats: CD, digital download; Label: Road Dawg

=== Singles ===
==== As main artist ====
List of singles, with selected chart positions and certifications
Title	Year	Peak chart positions				Album
Title	Year	US	AUS	CAN	UK	Album
"You Got It"	2007	—	—	—	—	Non-album single
"I Want It All" (with Ashley Tisdale)	2008	113	93	75	87	High School Musical 3: Senior Year
"135n8"	2014	—	—	—	—	Non-album single
"—" denotes releases that did not chart or were not released in that territory.

==== As featured artist ====
List of singles, with selected chart positions and certifications
Title	Year	Peak chart positions			Album
Title	Year	US	AUS	UK	Album
"What Time Is It?" (among the cast of High School Musical 2)	2007	6	20	20	High School Musical 2

=== Other appearances ===
Title	Year	Other artist(s)	Album
"You Know I Will"	2006	—N/a	The Fox and the Hound 2
"Go the Distance"	2007	—N/a	DisneyMania 5
"Jenny Got a Fever"	2007	—N/a	Alice Upside Down
"Gotta Rock"	2007	—N/a	Alice Upside Down
"Let It Snow"	2007	—N/a	Disney Channel Holiday
"Baby"	2011	—N/a	Sharpay's Fabulous Adventure
"Just a Little Peck"	2012	Adrian Slade and Drew Seeley	I Kissed a Vampire
"Happily Afterlife"	2012	Adrian Slade and Drew Seeley	I Kissed a Vampire
"Outta My Head"	2012	—N/a	I Kissed a Vampire

=== Other charted songs ===
List of songs, with selected chart positions and certifications, showing year released and album name
Title	Year	Peak chart positions				Certifications	Album
Title	Year	US	AUS	CAN	UK	Certifications	Album
"Bop to the Top" (with Ashley Tisdale)	2006	62	—	—	137		High School Musical
"We're All in This Together" (among the cast of High School Musical)	2006	34	—	—	40	RIAA: Gold	High School Musical
"Fabulous" (with Ashley Tisdale)	2007	76	91	63	64		High School Musical 2
"All for One" (among the cast of High School Musical 2)	2007	92	—	—	87		High School Musical 2
"A Night to Remember" (among the cast of High School Musical 3)	2008	— (Note: "A Night to Remember" did not enter the Billboard Hot 100, but peaked at number eight on the Bubbling Under Hot 100 Singles chart.)	96	—	94		High School Musical 3: Senior Year
"High School Musical" (among the cast of High School Musical 3)	2008	—	—	—	105		High School Musical 3: Senior Year
"—" denotes a recording that did not chart or was not released in that territory.

== Awards and nominations ==
Year	Award	Category	Work	Result
2011	Teen Choice Awards	Choice Summer TV Star: Male	Switched at Birth	Nominated
2013	Teen Choice Awards	Choice TV Actor: Drama	Switched at Birth	Nominated
2014	Teen Choice Awards	Choice TV Actor: Drama	Switched at Birth	Nominated
