= High School Musical 2 =

2007 film by Kenny Ortega

- Promotional poster
- Based on: Characters by Peter Barsocchini
- Written by: Peter Barsocchini
- Directed by: Kenny Ortega
- Starring: Zac Efron; Vanessa Hudgens; Ashley Tisdale; Lucas Grabeel; Corbin Bleu; Monique Coleman
- Composer: David Lawrence
- Country of origin: United States
- Original language: English

Production
- Producers: Bill Borden; Kenny Ortega
- Cinematography: Daniel Aranyó
- Editor: Seth Flaum
- Running time: 104 minutes
- Production companies: Salty Pictures; First Street Films
- Budget: $7 million

Original release
- Network: Disney Channel
- Release: August 17, 2007

Related
- High School Musical; High School Musical 3: Senior Year

High School Musical 2 is a 2007 American musical television film directed by Kenny Ortega and written by Peter Barsocchini. The 70th Disney Channel Original Movie (DCOM), it is the sequel to High School Musical (2006) and the second installment of the High School Musical film series. The film stars Zac Efron, Vanessa Hudgens, Ashley Tisdale, Lucas Grabeel, Corbin Bleu, and Monique Coleman. Taking place some time after the events of the first film, Troy Bolton (Efron), Gabriella Montez (Hudgens), and the Wildcats find summer jobs at a country club, but tensions rise when Sharpay Evans (Tisdale) recruits Bolton for a talent show performance.

High School Musical 2 retained Utah as a central filming location with a return to East High School, while Entrada at Snow Canyon Country Club was used as the filming location for the Evans' country club. Additional scenes were filmed in Los Angeles.

Upon the film's release on August 17, 2007, it broke a plethora of viewership records as it became the most commercially successful Disney Channel Original Movie (DCOM) ever produced. In the U.S., High School Musical 2 generated 17 million viewers in its premiere broadcast, smashing the record of its predecessor by over 10 million, while the figure remains the highest the network has ever produced. It also ranked as the highest-rated basic cable telecast at the time. The film's soundtrack enjoyed widespread success; it was certified double platinum in its first week as it debuted at number one in the United States, with its lead single "What Time Is It?" reaching number six on the Billboard Hot 100. The film and soundtrack received generally positive reviews from critics and audiences, with many considering it an improvement over its predecessor. The third and final installment of the film series, High School Musical 3: Senior Year, was theatrically released in October 2008.

== Plot ==
On the last day of school, the students of East High look forward to summer vacation ("What Time Is It?"). Wildcats captain Troy Bolton, still dating Gabriella Montez following their lead roles in the school's winter musical, (Note: As seen in High School Musical) is desperately looking for a summer job to help pay for college.

Sharpay Evans, still bitter about the musical's outcome and hoping to get Troy for herself, directs Mr. Fulton, the manager of her family's country club Lava Springs, to hire him. Troy accepts on the condition that the club hires Gabriella and their other friends as well. Sharpay's enjoyment of the country club ("Fabulous") is cut short upon learning that Gabriella is working as one of the lifeguards. Unable to get her fired, she orders Fulton to drive the Wildcats out by making the work miserable. Troy rebuilds their confidence and convinces them that they can persevere ("Work This Out"), despite Chad's initial objections. Later that day, Troy and Gabriella picnic on the golf course. A jealous Sharpay has the sprinklers turned on, but fails to ruin their romantic moment.

Troy and Gabriella's composer friend Kelsi Nielsen writes a song called "You Are the Music in Me" for them to sing at the club's upcoming talent show. Sharpay, hoping to get Troy to sing with her, arranges for him to be her father's caddy and eat dinner with their family, forcing him to be late to a date with Gabriella. (Note: Cut from the original broadcast but included in DVD and streaming releases is a scene in which Sharpay holds Troy up further by forcing him to watch her perform her own song "Humuhumunukunukuapua'a") Troy feels uncomfortable about being served by his friends, but his father and basketball coach advises him to make the most of the opportunities he's being given, as they may lead to an athletic scholarship.

Troy is further promoted, granted access to the club's facilities, and given the chance to play with the University of Albuquerque basketball team, and reluctantly accepts Sharpay's invitation to sing in the talent show. Gabriella's best friend Taylor warns her that Troy may not be able to resist the temptation of his dream future. Meanwhile, Sharpay's brother and singing partner Ryan becomes upset when Sharpay cuts him out of the act, and Gabriella invites him to a staff baseball game, where he persuades the Wildcats to take part in the talent show ("I Don't Dance").

Meanwhile, Sharpay forces Kelsi to re-arrange "You Are the Music in Me" into an up-tempo number which she and Troy rehearse. Seeing the staff members rehearse their number, she orders Fulton to ban all junior staff members from the talent show. Gabriella confronts Sharpay about her manipulation, quits, and leaves Troy ("Gotta Go My Own Way").

The other Wildcats are furious with Troy for his callous treatment and he resolves to make things right ("Bet on It"). Troy gets his old job back, barring him from singing in the talent show unless Sharpay lifts the restriction, which she reluctantly does. Ryan gives Troy a new song to learn moments before the show, "Everyday" which he sings with Gabriella as the Wildcats join them onstage. Sharpay presents Ryan with the award for the talent show. The Wildcats go to the golf course to enjoy the fireworks ("You Are the Music In Me (Reprise)"), Troy and Gabriella finally successfully kiss, and everyone at Lava Springs celebrates the end of summer with a pool party the next day ("All for One").

== Cast ==
- Zac Efron as Troy Bolton. For this movie, Efron did all of his own singing, whereas, in the first High School Musical, his singing was blended with singer Drew Seeley's voice.
- Vanessa Hudgens as Gabriella Montez
- Ashley Tisdale as Sharpay Evans
- Lucas Grabeel as Ryan Evans
- Corbin Bleu as Chad Danforth
- Monique Coleman as Taylor McKessie
- Mark L. Taylor as Thomas Fulton, the manager of Lava Springs Country Club
- Bart Johnson as Coach Jack Bolton, Troy's father
- Robert Curtis Brown as Vance Evans, Sharpay and Ryan's father
- Jessica Tuck as Darby Evans, Sharpay and Ryan's mother

Additionally, Alyson Reed reprises her role from the first film as Ms. Darbus, as do Chris Warren Jr., Ryne Sanborn, Olesya Rulin, and Kaycee Stroh as students Zeke Baylor, Jason Cross, Kelsi Nielsen, and Martha Cox, respectively.

The Sharpettes, Jackie, Lea and Emma, are played by Tanya Chisholm, Kelli Baker and McCall Clark, respectively. Leslie Wing Pomeroy reprises her role as Troy's mother Lucille. Director Kenny Ortega's dog Manly "Little Pickles" Ortega plays Sharpay's Yorkshire Terrier Boi, and Miley Cyrus makes a cameo appearance as a pool party attendee at the end of the film.

== Production ==
The film's musical numbers were choreographed by director Kenny Ortega, Charles Klapow and Bonnie Story, who had also collaborated on the first film. Writing in the Los Angeles Times, dance critic Lewis Segal described the choreography as drawing more on stepping than hip-hop, particularly in the baseball-themed number "I Don't Dance". Segal also noted that the continuity of the dancing was maintained across rapid camera cuts.

In a 2007 interview with the Directors Guild of America, Ortega discussed working with Klapow and Story during preparations for the sequel. The production had a 29-day shooting schedule following just over two weeks of rehearsals in Utah. Ortega described developing the musical numbers through music, choreography and script work before turning his attention to camera planning and rehearsals with the cast.

== Release ==
The premiere of High School Musical 2 aired at 8 PM Eastern Time on August 17, 2007, and included a telecast hosted by Kenny Ortega and the movie's cast. On Saturday, August 18, Disney Channel aired "High School Musical 2: Wildcat Chat", in which the stars of the movie answered questions posed by fans. On August 19, Disney aired a sing-along version of the movie. On May 23, DirecTV announced that they would be hosting an exclusive high-definition airing of the movie a few days after the August 17 premiere on its network-only channel, The 101.

Disney Channel aired a weekly program called Road to High School Musical 2, beginning on June 8, 2007, and leading up to the premiere of High School Musical 2 in August. The show offered viewers a behind-the-scenes look into the production of the movie. The world premiere of the opening number "What Time Is It" was on Radio Disney May 25, 2007, and similarly "You Are The Music In Me" premiered on July 13, 2007.

On December 11, 2007, the movie was released on DVD and Blu-ray titled High School Musical 2: Extended Edition. On September 15, 2008, a 2-disc special edition of the movie was released titled High School Musical 2: Deluxe Dance Edition.

== Songs ==
Song	Primarily sung by	Also sung by	Setting
"What Time Is It?"	Troy, Gabriella, Sharpay, Ryan, Chad, Taylor	Wildcats	East High
"Fabulous"	Sharpay	Ryan & Sharpettes	Lava Springs pool
"Work This Out"	Troy, Gabriella, Chad, Taylor, Kelsi, Zeke, Martha, Jason	Wildcats and kitchen workers	Lava Springs kitchen
"You Are the Music in Me"	Troy and Gabriella	Kelsi and Wildcats	Lava Springs dining room
"Humuhumunukunukuapua'a"	Sharpay and Ryan	Sharpettes	Lava Springs backstage room
"I Don't Dance"	Chad and Ryan	Baseball players, Wildcats, and company	Lava Springs baseball field
"You Are the Music in Me (Reprise)"	Sharpay and Troy	Sharpettes	Lava Springs stage
"Gotta Go My Own Way"	Gabriella	Troy	Lava Springs pool, locker Room, grounds
"Bet on It"	Troy	–	Lava Springs golf course
"Everyday"	Troy and Gabriella	Wildcats and company	Lava Springs stage
"All for One"	Troy, Gabriella, Sharpay, Ryan, Chad, Taylor	Kelsi, Zeke, Martha, Jason, Wildcats, company	Lava Springs pool

== Reception ==
=== Viewership ===
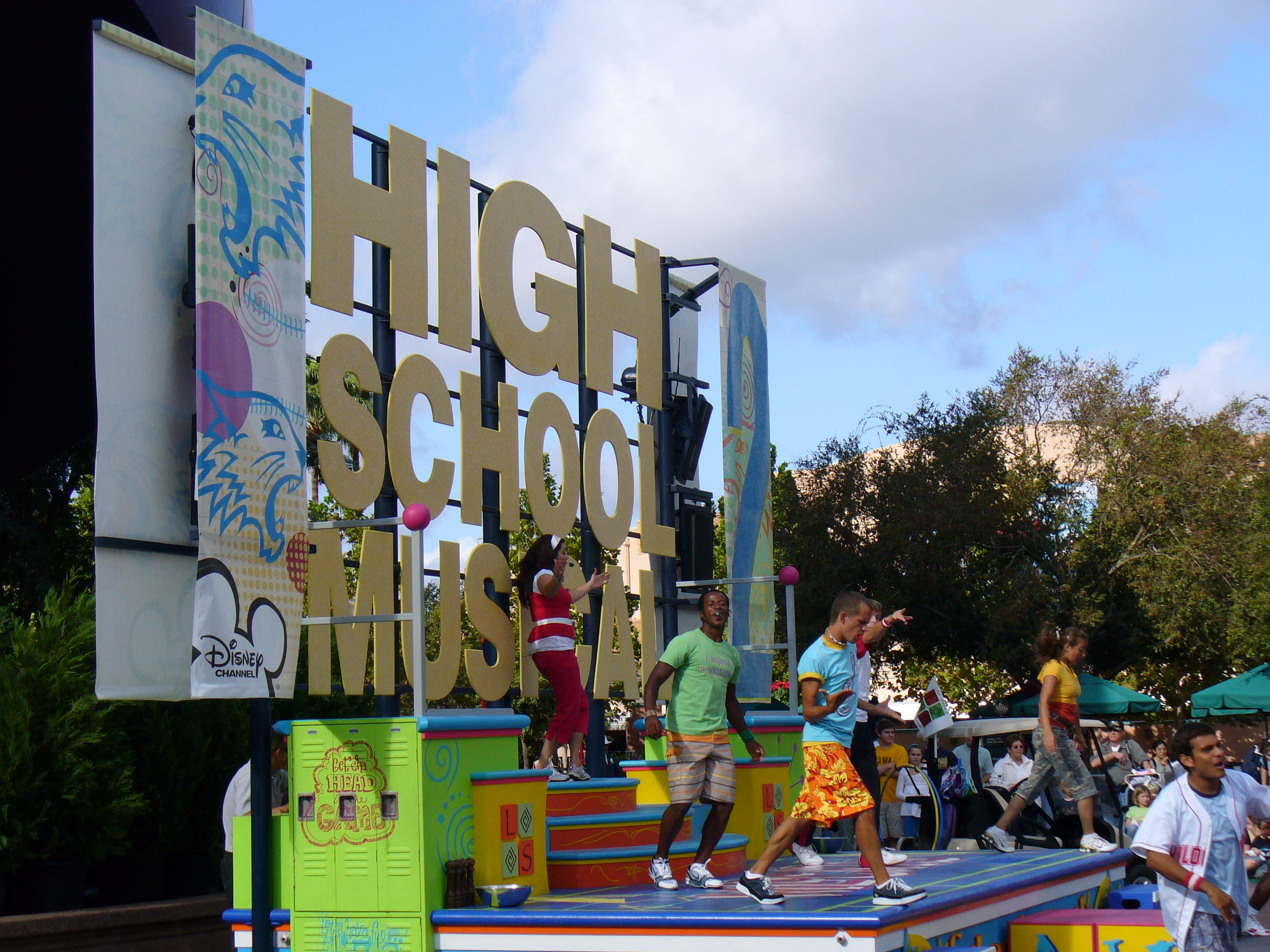
A performance of musical numbers from High School Musical 2 at Disney's Hollywood Studios

The first broadcast of the film on August 17, 2007, broke records, receiving 17.2 million viewers. This number made it, at the time, the most-watched basic-cable telecast in history (the previous record was held by an edition of ESPN's Monday Night Football between the New York Giants and the Dallas Cowboys on October 23, 2006, which attracted 16 million viewers), the most-watched made-for-cable movie ever (the previous record was held by TNT's January 21, 2001, airing of Crossfire Trail, which brought in 12.5 million viewers), and the largest audience of any program on broadcast or cable in the 2007 summer television season, along with Friday nights for the past five years. Ratings for the second showing of the movie fell to 8.4 million, and the third showing fell to 7.4 million, totaling the premiere weekend to 33.04 million viewers. Following the movie's airing, a preview of the new Disney Channel show Phineas and Ferb aired, which starred Tisdale.

In Latin America, the premiere of High School Musical 2 was seen by 3.3 million viewers in the north region. The film was the most-watched in its schedule, among all cable channels, and produced the highest rating of the channel, surpassing all original films of Disney Channel. Among other records, the premiere in Argentina surpassed the debut of High School Musical the previous year by 107 percent, while in Brazil the sequel grew by 208 percent, and Mexico did so by 61 percent. In the United Kingdom, the movie became Disney Channel UK's most viewed program ever, totaling 1.2 million viewers in its first showing.

=== Critical response ===
On Rotten Tomatoes the film has an approval rating of 83% based on 23 reviews, with an average rating of 5.8/10. The website's critics consensus reads, "Surprisingly better than its predecessor, High School Musical 2 returns to enchant tweens with its snappy songs, wicked dance moves, and peppy spirit." Metacritic assigned the film a weighted average score of 72 out of 100, based on 23 critics, indicating "generally favorable" reviews.

USA Today's Robert Bianco awarded the film three stars out of four, saying High School Musical 2 was "sweet, smart, bursting with talent and energy, and awash in innocence". While critics enjoyed the film, they noted that the timing of the movie's premiere seemed odd, premiering just when school was about to start up again, while the movie's plot involved the gang going on summer vacation. High School Musical 2 won the "So Hot Right Now" award at the Nickelodeon Australian Kids' Choice Awards 2007, in which High School Musical castmate Zac Efron hosted with The Veronicas.

== Stage adaptation ==
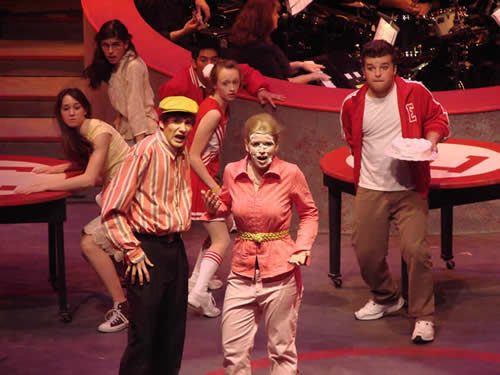
Pacific Repertory Theatre's School of Dramatic Arts High School Musical Act 1 Finale

Like its predecessor, High School Musical 2 has been adapted into two different theatrical productions: a one-act, 70-minute version and a two-act full-length production. This stage production includes the song "Hummuhummunukunukuapua'a" that was left out of the original movie but included in the DVD. Through Music Theater International, Disney Theatrical began licensing the theatrical rights in October 2008. MTI had originally recruited 7 schools to serve as tests for the new full-length adaptation, but due to complications with multiple drafts of both the script and the score, all but two schools were forced to drop out of the pilot program.

- On May 18, 2008, Woodlands High School became the first school to produce High School Musical 2.
- From July 17–August 3, 2008, Harrell Theatre, in Collierville, Tennessee, was the first community theatre to perform the production, which featured both a senior cast and a junior cast.
- From January 15–February 15, 2009, the West Coast premiere production was presented by Pacific Repertory Theatre's School of Dramatic Arts. The production was directed by PacRep founder Stephen Moorer, who previously directed the California premiere of the first High School Musical.
- From April 6–18, 2009, the UK Premiere was performed by StageDaze Theatre Company in Cardiff.

== Awards ==
Year	Award	Category	Result
2007	American Music Award	Favorite Soundtrack (High School Musical 2 (soundtrack))	Won
2007	Bravo Magazine Award	Bravo Otto for TV Star – Male (Zac Efron)	Won
2007	CMA Wild and Young Awards	Best Single International (You Are the Music in Me by Zac Efron and Vanessa Hudgens and written by Jamie Houston)	Won
2007	Family Television Awards	Best Actor (Zac Efron)	Won
2007	Nickelodeon Australian Kids' Choice Awards	Fave Movie Star (Zac Efron)	Won
2007	Nickelodeon Australian Kids' Choice Awards	So Hot Right Now!	Won
2007	Nickelodeon UK Kids' Choice Awards	Best TV Actress (Ashley Tisdale)	Won
2007	Nickelodeon UK Kids' Choice Awards	Best TV Actor (Zac Efron)	Nominated
2007	People's Choice Awards	Favorite Star Under 35 (Zac Efron)	Won
2007	Teen Choice Awards	Choice TV: Movie	Won
2008	ALMA Award	Outstanding Director of a Made–for–TV Movie (Kenny Ortega)	Won
2008	ASTRA Awards	Favourite International Program	Won
2008	ASTRA Awards	Favourite International Personality or Actor (Zac Efron)	Nominated
2008	Cinema Audio Society Awards	Outstanding Achievement in Sound Mixing for Television Movies and Miniseries (Douglas Cameron, Terry O'Bright and Keith Rogers)	Nominated
2008	Directors Guild of America Award	Outstanding Directorial Achievement in Children's Program (Kenny Ortega)	Nominated
2008	Golden Reel Award	Best Sound Editing – Music for Long Form Television (Michael Dittrick and Amber Funk)	Won
2008	Image Award	Outstanding Children's Program	Nominated
2008	PGA Awards	Outstanding Producer for Long–Form Television (Bill Borden and Barry Rosenbush)	Nominated
2008	Primetime Emmy Award	Outstanding Choreography (Kenny Ortega, Bonnie Story and Charles Klapow)	Nominated
2008	Primetime Emmy Award	Outstanding Children's Program (Don Schain, Bill Borden and Barry Rosenbush)	Nominated
2008	Television Critics Association Awards	Outstanding Achievement in Children's Programming	Nominated
