= Nikki Gil =

Filipina singer, actress, host, model and VJ (born 1987)

Nikki Gil-Albert
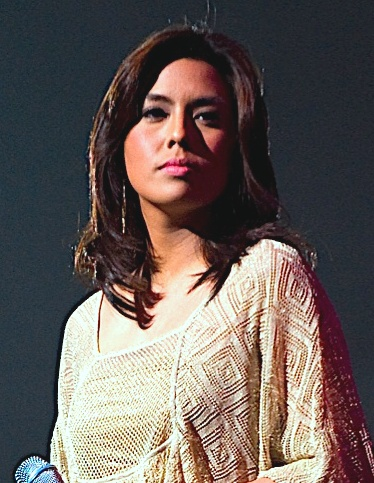
- Gil at the Star Magic Concert in June 2009
- Born: Monica Pauline Santos Gil; August 23, 1987 (age 39); Manila, Philippines
- Occupations: Singer; actress; TV host; model
- Years active: 2002–2015, 2026–present
- Agents: Star Magic (2005–2010); ALV Talent Circuit (2010–2015, 2026–present)
- Spouse: BJ Albert (m. 2015)
- Children: 2
- Musical career
- Genres: Pop
- Instruments: Vocals; piano
- Labels: EMI, Walt Disney, PolyEast, Universal Records

Monica Pauline "Nikki" Santos Gil-Albert (Tagalog pronunciation: [ˈhil]; born August 23, 1987) is a Filipino singer, actress, host, model, and video jockey. She is known for being part of the afternoon remake of Carlo J. Caparas' Pieta (2008–2009) and, in 2009, for portraying Princess Punzalan in the afternoon drama Nagsimula sa Puso (2009–2010). She is also well known for her lead portrayal as Jennifer "Jenny" La Peña in the 2012 remake of the 1990 radio serial of Salvador Royales' Mundo Man ay Magunaw, originally played by Jennifer Sevilla in the film version produced by SEIKO Films.

== Biography ==
Monica Pauline Gil (aka Nikki Gil) was born in Manila to Dino and Julie Gil. She is of Filipino, Spanish and German descent. Born to a father who plays the piano and a mom who sang in a church choir, Nikki showed early signs of musical talent. At the age of four years, Nikki was already singing and doing voiceovers for commercials. She graduated from Shekinah Christian Training Center in March 2005 as valedictorian. In 2009, she graduated from Ateneo de Manila University, majoring in English literature. Prior to the COVID-19 pandemic, she was taking a Bachelor of Science in Interior Design at the Philippine School of Interior Design (PSID) following her mother who had just graduated in 2015. She finally completed her second degree from the School of Fashion and Arts (SoFA) Design Institute with the highest distinction and a Best Thesis Award in August 2026.

== Career ==
=== Music ===
Gil first rose to prominence when she was 17 years old after appearing in a 2005 Coca-Cola commercial. After that, she went on to release her first self-titled album, Nikki Gil, that same year under EMI Philippines with "Sakayan ng Jeep" as the carrier single. In 2006, it was repackaged and rereleased with and additional song, "Glowing Inside". In July 2006, EMI Philippines and Walt Disney Records hired Nikki along with other Asian artists (Vince Chong of Malaysia and Alicia Pan of Singapore) to sing and to star in the music video of "High School Musical", a Disney Channel production. Nikki also sang "Breaking Free" and "Gotta Go My Own Way" in the production's album.

In 2008, Gil released her second music album, Hear My Heart, with "Hear My Heart" as the carrier single. She co-wrote the song with her younger sister, Dani. During the same year, Disney hired her to sing and star in the music video of the pop version of "It's a Small World After All". In addition, she was asked to sing the Tagalog version of the song at the grand opening of "It's a Small World" in Hong Kong Disneyland.

In 2010, Gil released her third music album, Somebody to Love, with "Somebody to Love" as the carrier single, a song written by her younger sister, Dani. Gil played the character of Elle Woods in the Manila production of the musical Legally Blonde which is based on the 2001 Metro-Goldwyn-Mayer motion picture Legally Blonde and the novel by Amanda Brown.

In 2014, Nikki moved to her new recording company, Universal Records.

In 2015, Gil released her fourth and her last recording album, Love Revisited, with a rendition of the Apo Hiking Society classic, "When I Met You" as the carrier single.

=== Acting career and TV hosting ===
In 2005, Gil was given a VJ stint for ABS-CBN Corporation's music channel subsidiary, MYX until she left MYX in January 2016. She was also picked to host the now-defunct talk show MRS on ABS-CBN and morning show Breakfast on Studio 23. She later would join the cast of the weekly variety show ASAP Mania. In 2006, she was joined by Toni Gonzaga, Bianca Gonzalez and Sam Milby as a host for the first season of Pinoy Dream Academy, a singing reality show from Endemol. In 2007, she became part of an anime-inspired fantasy series Rounin and as an extended cast for the drama series Pangarap na Bituin. In 2008, she was again chosen to be the host for the season 2 of Pinoy Dream Academy with Toni Gonzaga and Billy Crawford. In 2009, she appeared in Pieta, an afternoon soap opera with Ryan Agoncillo, and also appeared in the horror drama series Florinda with Maricel Soriano. Nikki Gil is one of the mainstay on ABS-CBN with ASAP XV. In 2010, she started hosting E-Live along with Luis Manzano and Ogie Diaz. She also did a fair share of hosting occasionally on Showtime replacing Anne Curtis.

In 2007, Gil did her first movie appearance by doing a cameo role as John Lloyd Cruz's best friend for One More Chance. In 2009, she appeared along with Bea Alonzo, Sam Milby and Derek Ramsay for a Star Cinema movie entitled And I Love You So. In 2010, she was the lead actress in a romance film entitled The Red Shoes produced by Unitel Pictures with Marvin Agustin, which won the Best Picture in the 7th Bogota International Film Festival.

In 2012, Gil became part of the TV remake of the Salvador Royales film Mundo Man ay Magunaw as Jennifer la Pena.

In 2013, she played a special participation role in Apoy sa Dagat as young Odessa, and later became a star antagonist in the remake of Maria Mercedes as Misty. The same year, Nikki Gil won as Best Single Performance By An Actress for her role in "MMK" in the recent 2013 PMPC Star Awards For TV.

In 2014, she was a member of the cast of Hawak-Kamay, playing Meann.

She was expected to return to showbiz through a musical play from Repertory Philippines entitled 'Carousel'. But due to the COVID-19 pandemic, it was cancelled.

== Personal life ==
She has a sister, Dani Gil, who also sings and plays the piano. Dani helped Nikki compose her songs, too. Nikki first performed in front of an audience in church as a worship leader before entering the entertainment business.

In 2008, Gil began dating Billy Crawford, and their relationship ended in 2013. According to Gil, the breakup was caused by Crawford's infidelity while she chose to remain celibate until marriage: "The scary thing, knowing what I know now, is I would have said yes to his insincere offers of marriage!" she said. "I was made to believe I was making up these things in my head—I thought we were just plateau-ing." Gil married BJ Albert (nephew of singer-actress Joey Albert) on November 21, 2015. In November 2017, Gil gave birth to her first child, a boy. And in October 2021, to a girl. She is now retired from showbiz to focus on her family life.

== Theater ==
- 2007: Seussical the Musical - The Cat
- 2010: Legally Blonde: The Musical - Elle Woods
- 2011: Sweet Charity - Charity Hope Valentine
- 2013: They are Playing Our Song - Sonia Walsk
- 2014: The Last 5 Years - Cathy Hyatt

== Filmography ==
=== Film ===
Year	Title	Role
2007	One More Chance	Helen
2009	And I Love You So	Audrey Cruz
2010	The Red Shoes	Bettina
2012	Moron 5 and the Crying Lady	Bank Teller (Cameo)
2013	Badil	Jen
2014	My Big Bossing's Adventures	Princessa Reyna Beatriz

=== Television ===
Year	Title	Role
2005	Extra Challenge	Herself/Guest Co-Host
2005	Eat Bulaga!	Guest
2005–2015	ASAP	Herself
2005–2015	Myx	VJ
2005	Breakfast	Herself
2006	Pinoy Dream Academy	Host
2006	Komiks Presents: Da Adventures of Pedro Penduko	Joseline
2006	Star Magic Presents: Love and the City	Trina
2006	Your Song: If I Keep My Heart Out of Sight	
2007	Rounin	Leal
2007	Pangarap na Bituin	Sapphire Gomez
2007	Your Song: Ang Pag-ibig Kong Ito	
2008	Lovebook Presents: Break-Up Diaries	Monica
2008–2009	Carlo J. Caparas' Pieta	Guia V. Angeles
2009	Maalaala Mo Kaya: Kalendaryo	Nene
2009	Sineserye Presents: Florinda	Mara Bautista
2009	Your Song: If You're Not the One	Rain Navarro
2009–2010	Nagsimula sa Puso	Julie Bernardo
2010	Agimat: Ang Mga Alamat ni Ramon Revilla: Tonyong Bayawak	Angie Inocencio
2011	Pilipinas Got Talent	Herself / Guest Host
2012; 2013	It's Showtime	Guest Hurado / Co-Host / Performer
2012	Mundo Man ay Magunaw	Jennifer La Peña
2013	Apoy sa Dagat	young Odessa Villarosa-del Sol
2013	Maalaala Mo Kaya: Ilog	Precy
2013–2014	Maria Mercedes	Misty Delaver
2014	Hawak-Kamay	Meryl Anne "Meann" Marcelo

== Discography ==
=== Albums ===
Year	Album	Released	Label
2005	Nikki Gil	2005	PolyEast Records
2008	Hear My Heart	May 16, 2008	PolyEast Records
2010	Somebody to Love	March 17, 2010	PolyEast Records
2014	My Renditions	2014	PolyEast Records
2015	Love Revisited	March 16, 2015	Universal Records

=== Singles ===
Year	Title	Album
2005	"Sakayan ng Jeep"	Nikki Gil
2006	"If I Keep My Heart Out of Sight"	Nikki Gil
2006	"Forever Is Not As Long As It Used to Be"	Nikki Gil
2008	"Hear My Heart"	Hear My Heart
2008	"Million Miles Away"	Hear My Heart
2009	"If You're Not the One"	Hear My Heart
2010	"Magbabalik Ka Pa Ba"	Somebody to Love
2010	"Somebody to Love"	Somebody to Love
2010	"Kung Wala Ka"	Somebody to Love
2010	"You Are My Life" (featuring Billy Crawford)	Somebody to Love

=== Official soundtrack ===
- Mahal Naman Kita - I Love Betty La Fea soundtrack

=== Other appearances ===
Year	Song	Album
2006	"Breaking Free" (with Vince Chong and Alicia Pan)	High School Musical
2006	"Kasi Naman"	Hotsilog: The ASAP Hotdog Compilation
2007	"Gotta Go My Own Way" (with Tom Price)	High School Musical 2
2011	"Pilipinas, Tara Na!" (various artists) (remake of Biyahe Tayo)	Single-only release
2014	"Babalikan Mo Rin Ako"	Philpop 2014

== Awards and nominations ==
Year	Award giving body	Category	Nominated work	Results
2008	Awit Awards	Best Performance by a Duet	"Ang Aking Awitin" with Ronnie Liang	Nominated
2010	Aliw Awards	Best Actress	—N/a	Nominated
2010	Vietnam International Film Festival	Best Actress	—N/a	Nominated
2011	Broadway World Philippines Awards	Best Leading Actress	—N/a	Won
2013	Aliw Awards	Best Actress	—N/a	Nominated
2013	PMPC Star Awards for TV	Best Single Performance by An Actress	Maalaala Mo Kaya: Ilog	Won
2014	40th Metro Manila Film Festival	Best Festival Supporting Actress	My Big Bossing	Nominated
