= What Time Is It? (song) =

Single by High School Musical 2 cast

from the album High School Musical 2
- Released: July 16, 2007
- Recorded: 2007
- Genre: Dance-pop; teen pop; R&B
- Length: 3:48
- Label: Walt Disney
- Songwriters: Matthew Gerrard; Robbie Nevil

High School Musical singles chronology
"We're All in This Together" (2006)	"What Time Is It?" (2007)	"I Don't Dance" (2007)

"What Time Is It?" is the opening musical number and first single from the Disney Channel Original Movie High School Musical 2. It is featured on the High School Musical 2 soundtrack, and is the first song off the High School Musical 2 soundtrack.

The song had its world premiere on Radio Disney on May 25, 2007, as part of its Planet Premiere featurette. On June 8, Disney premiered the video as a sneak peek in multiple nations at close to the same time. The single was released on July 16, 2007, worldwide, and on July 17, 2007, in the United States.

== Music video ==
Ashley Tisdale as Sharpay (center) in the music video.

The song's video clip and the sequence in the movie commence with the whole of the East High Wildcats in a classroom. On the blackboard in that classroom, a photo is visible with Sharpay and Ryan Evans performing "Bop to the Top", next to where it says "School's Out!" A poster for the East High Winter Musical, "Twinkle Town", featuring Troy Bolton (Zac Efron) and Gabriella Montez (Vanessa Hudgens) is also visible. When the clock had ten seconds to go before the bell, the class commenced chanting "summer!" getting louder until the bell rang, after which the song was performed. The music video contains clips directly from the movie, and was released on July 31, 2007, on the iTunes Store. The music video was also released on the Disney Channel.

== Other versions ==
- In November 2007, the cast performed a Christmas version of "What Time Is It?" (i.e.; What time is it? Christmastime!) in Disneyland for the Walt Disney World Christmas Day Parade telecast, as all the cast was there except Zac and Lucas. The broadcast aired on ABC Christmas Day (December 25).
- At Tokyo Disneyland's Jubilation! Parade, part of the song (with revised lyrics) is heard sung in English during the showstop.
- Spanish singer Edurne recorded a version of this song on her 2008 album Premiere.
- Valleyfair’s kids’ band, The Squiggles (Anna, Matt, John, Jack and Jeremy), covered it with adapted lyrics for their 2009 summer show.

== Formats ==
Enhanced CD single
No.	Title	Length
1.	"What Time Is It?"	3:48
2.	"High School Musical 2" (movie trailer; enhanced video)	2:09

iTunes store single
No.	Title	Length
1.	"Radio Disney Interview: High School Musical 2"	2:14
2.	"What Time Is It?"	3:18

== Charts ==
The song debuted and peaked at number 6 on the Billboard Hot 100 chart dated August 4, 2007, becoming the second top 10 on chart for the high school musical cast. The song peaked at number 1 on the Billboard Hot Singles Sales chart for 28 weeks, which became the highest selling physical single of the year-end chart in 2007.

Weekly chart performance for "What Time Is It?"
Chart (2007)	Peak position
Australia (ARIA)	20
Canada Hot 100 (Billboard)	66
Ireland (IRMA)	10
Italy (FIMI)	45
Scottish Singles Sales (Official Charts)	8
UK Singles (Official Charts)	20
US Billboard Hot 100	6
US Pop 100 (Billboard)	6

== Certifications ==
Region	Certification	Certified units/sales
United States (RIAA)	Gold	500,000^{‡}
^{‡} Sales+streaming figures based on certification alone.
