= Zac Efron =

American actor (born 1987)

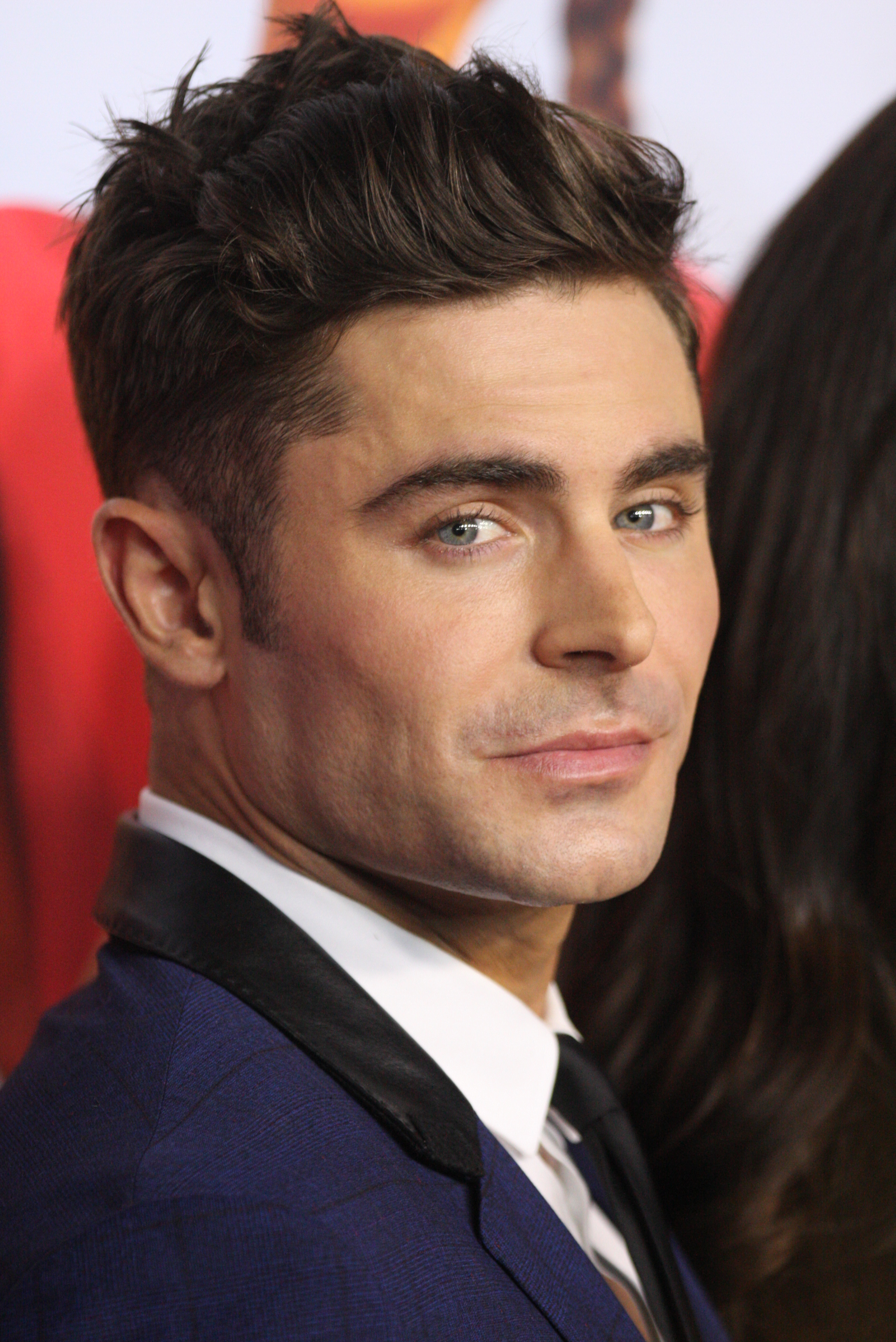
- Efron in 2017
- Born: Zachary David Alexander Efron; October 18, 1987 (age 39); San Luis Obispo, California, U.S.
- Occupation: Actor
- Years active: 2002–present
- Relatives: Dylan Efron (brother)

Zachary David Alexander Efron (/ˈɛfrɒn/; born October 18, 1987) is an American actor. Efron began acting professionally in the early 2000s and rose to prominence as a teen idol for his leading role as Troy Bolton in the High School Musical film series (2006–2008). During this time, he also starred in the musical film Hairspray (2007) and the comedy film 17 Again (2009).

Efron had starring roles in New Year's Eve (2011), The Lucky One (2012), The Paperboy (2012), Neighbors (2014), That Awkward Moment (2014) Dirty Grandpa (2016), Baywatch (2017), and The Greatest Showman (2017). His roles have included Ted Bundy in Extremely Wicked, Shockingly Evil and Vile (2019) and Kevin Von Erich in The Iron Claw (2023).

In 2021, Efron won a Daytime Emmy Award for hosting the Netflix travel show Down to Earth with Zac Efron (2020–2022). In 2023, he received a star on the Hollywood Walk of Fame.

== Early life ==
Zachary David Alexander Efron was born on October 18, 1987, and grew up in Arroyo Grande, California. His father, David Efron, is an electrical engineer at Diablo Canyon Power Plant, and his mother, Starla Baskett, is an administrative assistant who also works at Diablo Canyon. Efron has a younger sister and two younger brothers, including Dylan Efron, and had, as he has described, a "normal childhood" in a middle-class family. His surname originates from Hebrew. He has described himself as Jewish, though he was raised agnostically and did not practice religion as a child.

He has said that he would "flip out" if he got a "B" and not an "A" in school, and was a class clown there. Efron subsequently worked at The Great American Melodrama and the Vaudeville theaters, and began taking singing lessons. He performed in shows such as Gypsy; Peter Pan, or The Boy Who Wouldn't Grow Up; Little Shop of Horrors; and The Music Man. He was recommended to an agent in Los Angeles by his drama teacher, Robyn Metchik, the mother of actor Aaron Michael Metchik. Efron was later signed to the Creative Artists Agency.

Efron graduated from Arroyo Grande High School in 2006 and was then accepted into the University of Southern California but did not enroll. He also attended Pacific Conservatory of the Performing Arts, a theater company operating out of Allan Hancock College, a community college located in Santa Maria, California, where he performed in 2000 and 2001.

== Career ==
=== 2002–2009: Early career and High School Musical ===
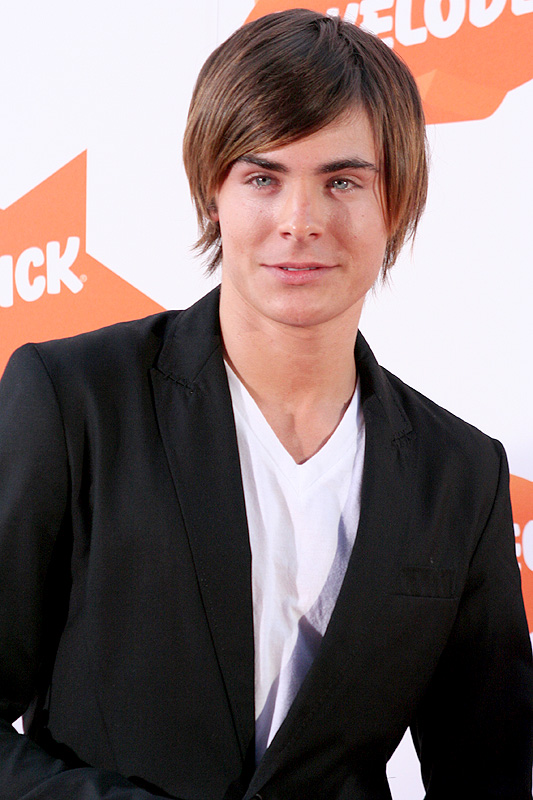
Efron at the 2007 Nickelodeon Australian Kids' Choice Awards

Efron began acting in the early 2000s with guest roles on several television series including Firefly, ER, and The Guardian. In 2004, he began appearing as a recurring character in the first season of the WB series Summerland. For the show's second season, which aired in 2005, he was promoted to the main cast. He also appeared in some films, including the Lifetime television film Miracle Run (2004), for which he earned a Young Artist Award nomination for his performance as one of two autistic twins.

Efron's career reached a turning point with the teen musical television film High School Musical (2006), which premiered on the Disney Channel in January 2006. The film, which has been described as a modern adaptation of Romeo and Juliet, saw Efron playing the male lead Troy Bolton, a high school basketball player who feels conflicted when he finds himself interested in participating in the school musical with Gabriella Montez (Vanessa Hudgens), a girl from the scholastic decathlon team. The film's success helped Efron gain recognition among teenage audiences. The film's soundtrack was certified quadruple platinum by the RIAA. However, Efron's recordings of the film's songs were not included in the final cut, and the majority of his parts were sung by Drew Seeley; the Troy Bolton role had been intended for a tenor before Efron's casting and Efron was a baritone. In his subsequent musical films, Efron did his own singing.

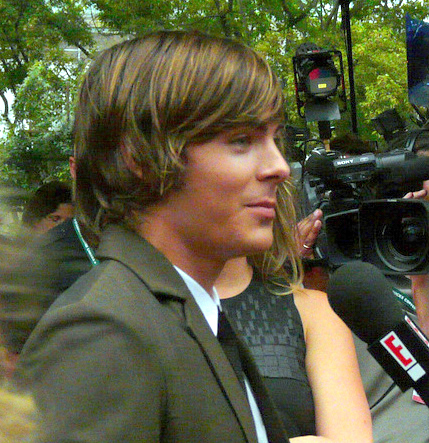
Efron in 2008

Efron was next seen as Link Larkin in the musical comedy film Hairspray (2007), based on the 2002 Broadway musical of the same name. Production conflicted with the High School Musical concert tour, which prevented Efron from joining; Drew Seeley filled in. The film became a major commercial and critical success upon its release in July 2007. Later that year, he reprised his role of Troy Bolton in High School Musical 2 (2007), which aired on the Disney Channel in August 2007.

Efron again reprised his role in High School Musical 3: Senior Year (2008), the first film in the High School Musical franchise to receive a theatrical release. The film succeeded at the box office, and received mixed to positive reviews from critics. He followed this with the commercially successful comedy 17 Again (2009) about a 37-year-old man who is transformed into his 17-year-old self (Efron) after a chance accident.

=== 2009–present: Dramatic roles and mainstream projects ===
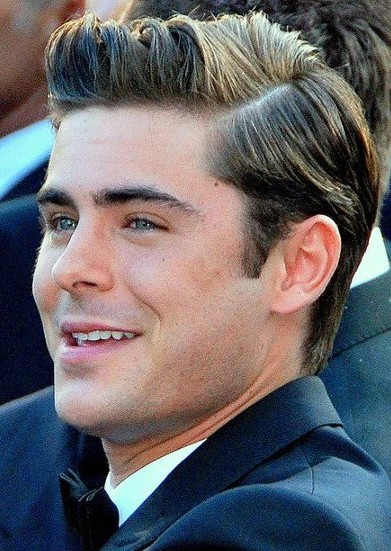
Efron at the 2012 Cannes Film Festival

Efron's next release was Richard Linklater's period drama Me and Orson Welles, which premiered at the Toronto International Film Festival in September 2008 and received a wide release in late 2009. The film earned mostly positive reviews from critics. He then played the title role in the supernatural romantic drama Charlie St. Cloud (2010), which became a moderate success at the box office despite receiving mostly negative reviews from critics. Efron appeared as a part of the large ensemble cast in Garry Marshall's New Year's Eve (2011), which depicted a series of holiday vignettes of different groups of characters. The film received almost unanimously negative reviews from critics, but did well at the box office. He also played a supporting role in the critically successful Liberal Arts (2012), which premiered at the Sundance Film Festival in January 2012 and received a limited release later that year. He also starred in The Paperboy (2012), which premiered at the Cannes Film Festival in May 2012 and received a wider release later that year. The film received mixed to negative reviews from critics.

After lending his voice to the animated film The Lorax (2012), he appeared as the male lead in the romantic drama The Lucky One (2012), based on the novel of the same name by Nicholas Sparks. The film became a success financially despite negative reviews from critics. He also starred in the drama At Any Price, which premiered at the 2012 Venice International Film Festival, and the historical drama Parkland, which premiered at the 2013 Venice International Film Festival. Both films received mixed reviews from critics. Efron's first release of 2014 was the romantic comedy That Awkward Moment, for which he also served as an executive producer. The film, which starred Efron as one of three bachelors in New York City, became a moderate commercial success despite receiving mostly negative reviews from critics.

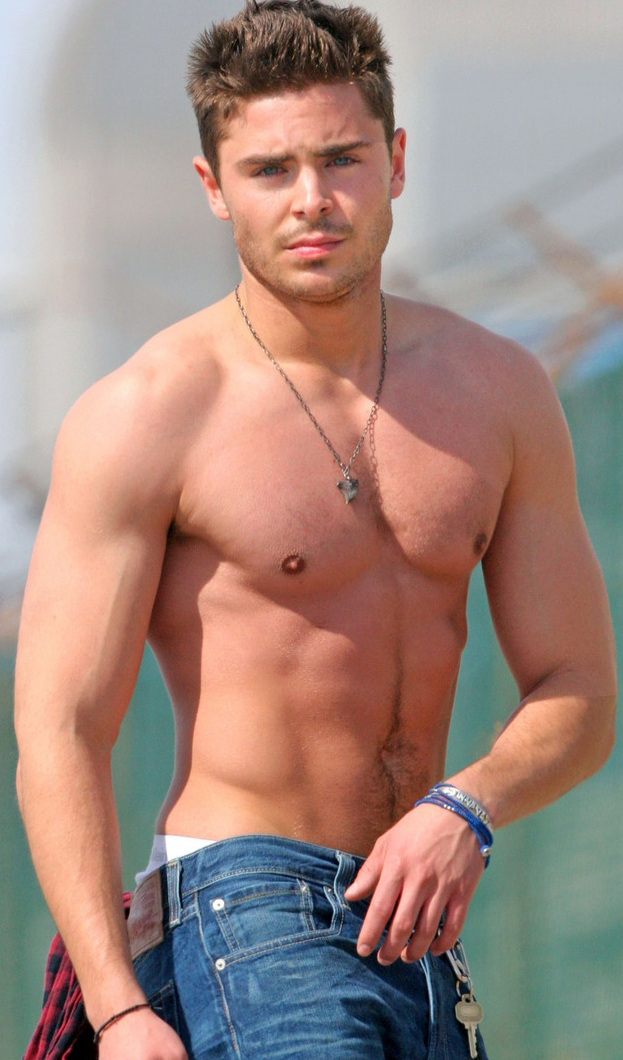
Efron in 2012

Later in 2014, Efron was seen in the adult comedy Neighbors (2014). The film revolved around a young couple who struggle to raise their baby daughter while living next to the house of a wild fraternity led by its president, played by Efron. The film was a commercial success and earned mostly positive reviews from critics, who also added that he had successfully shed his "Disney pretty boy" image.

Efron's only release in 2015 was the moderately successful We Are Your Friends, in which he played a struggling DJ. In January 2016, he starred in the adult comedy Dirty Grandpa as a straitlaced young man who begrudgingly indulges his grandfather's unhinged personality by taking him on a vacation to Florida. The film received mostly negative reviews from critics for its crude humor but became a commercial success. He subsequently starred in the comedy sequel Neighbors 2: Sorority Rising, which became a commercial and critical success upon its release in May 2016. The film followed the same couple who team up with their former rival (Efron) to take down a hard-partying sorority led by a freshman. His third 2016 comedy, released in July, was Mike and Dave Need Wedding Dates.

In 2017, Efron starred as Matt Brody in Baywatch, an action comedy film version of the television series of the same name, released in May. Also in 2017, Efron had a supporting role in two biographical films released in December: The Disaster Artist, a comedy-drama directed by and starring James Franco, and as Phillip in the musical The Greatest Showman. Both films were nominated for the Golden Globe Award for Best Motion Picture – Musical or Comedy.

In 2019, Efron played a drug-addled libertine in the Harmony Korine film The Beach Bum. He also starred as serial killer Ted Bundy in Extremely Wicked, Shockingly Evil and Vile. The film premiered at Sundance in early 2019 and was released by Netflix on May 3.

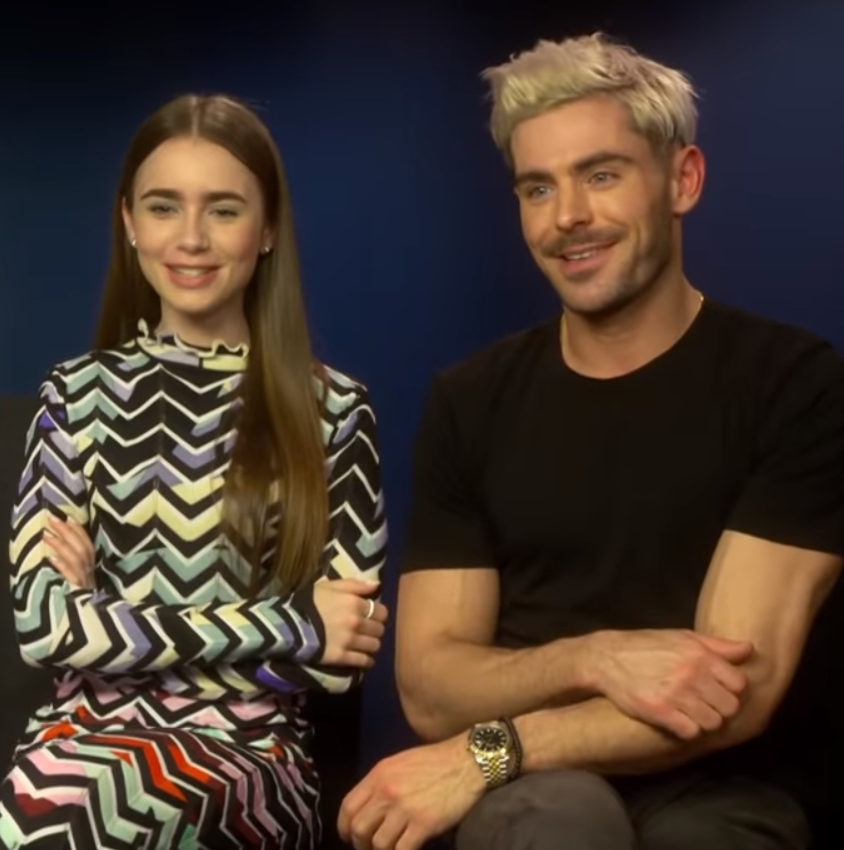
Efron and Extremely Wicked, Shockingly Evil and Vile co-star Lily Collins in 2019

In 2020, Efron voiced Fred Jones in Warner Bros.' Scooby-Doo animated film, Scoob! In 2021, he won a Daytime Emmy Award for Outstanding Daytime Program Host for the Netflix web documentary series Down to Earth with Zac Efron.

In 2022, he starred in the survival thriller Gold, directed by Anthony Hayes and headlined the horror film Firestarter, a remake of the 1984 film based upon the novel of the same name by Stephen King, directed by Keith Thomas. Also that year, he starred in Peter Farrelly's Vietnam War–set comedy The Greatest Beer Run Ever, which received mixed reviews.

In 2023, he starred as Kevin Von Erich in Sean Durkin's The Iron Claw, about the Von Erich family of wrestlers. That same year, Efron was awarded his own star on the Hollywood Walk of Fame.

In 2024, Efron played Chris Cole, the role with Joey King and Nicole Kidman in the romantic comedy A Family Affair of Netflix. That same year, he also played a lead role in the comedy Ricky Stanicky.

In 2025, Efron played himself in an episode of the comedy series The Studio.

In 2026, Efron is set to play a lead role with Debby Ryan and Phoebe Dynevor in the thriller movie Famous. That same year, he is also expected to play a lead role with Will Ferrell and Regina Hall in the comedy film Judgment Day.

=== Other work ===
In 2010, Efron started his own production company under Warner Bros., Ninjas Runnin' Wild. The company played a part in the production of his films Dirty Grandpa, That Awkward Moment, and Extremely Wicked, Shockingly Evil and Vile. In 2019, Efron's brother Dylan Efron, who also plays a role in the company, stated that Ninjas Runnin' Wild has started to produce more digital content in addition to their traditional film work.

Efron announced the creation of his YouTube channel in March 2019. The video sharing platform hosts two weekly series. "Off the Grid" follows Efron and his brother Dylan as they participate in outdoor activities and trips without electronic devices—with the exception of a video camera in order to document their experiences. "Gym Time" spotlights fitness and nutrition, with Efron informing his viewers that he plans to "train with celebrities, athletes, and interesting people". YouTube received backlash for promoting Efron's new channel in a post made from their official Twitter account. Some YouTube users accused the platform of promoting a mainstream celebrity's account, which they feared would overshadow lesser known creators.

== Personal life ==
Efron was on the Forbes Celebrity 100 list in 2008 at number 92, with estimated earnings of $5.8 million from June 2007 to June 2008. In April 2009, his personal wealth equaled about $10 million. In May 2015, Efron's net worth was $18 million.

Efron turned to Transcendental Meditation to help decompress after struggling to separate himself from his role as serial killer Ted Bundy. "I really love TM, transcendental meditation. I did TM on the way home. Not while driving, but when you're shooting a movie, one thing we can afford is a ride home, so on the way home I just do some TM and try to phase out of it."

Efron moved to Australia after selling his Los Angeles home in early 2021 and purchased a property in Byron Bay while working on projects there.

=== Relationships ===
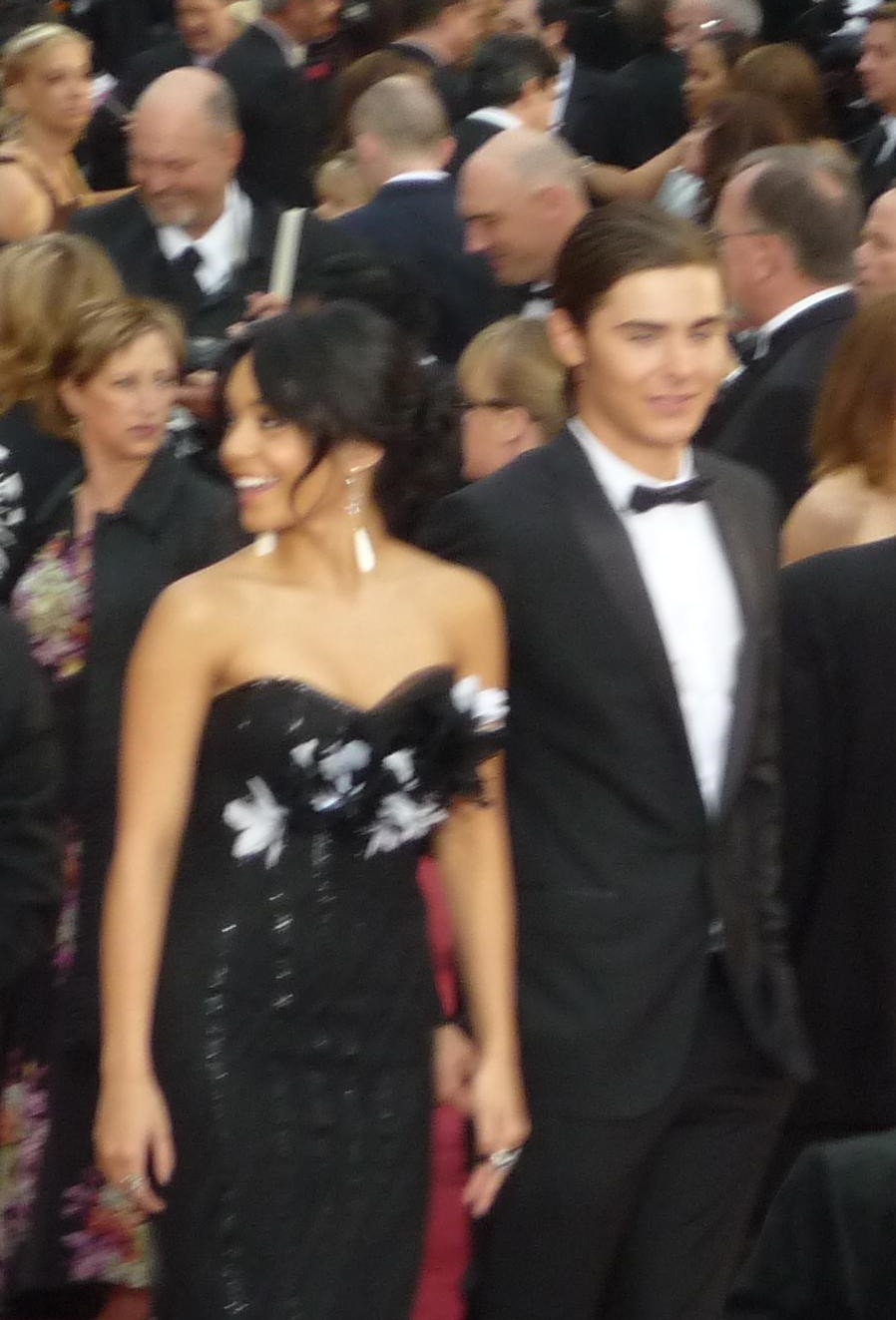
Efron with Hudgens at 81st Academy Awards, 2009

From 2005 to 2010, Efron was in a relationship with actress Vanessa Hudgens, whom he met on the set of High School Musical.

From September 2014 to April 2016, he was in a relationship with model Sami Miro.

From June 2020 to April 2021, Efron dated Australian model Vanessa Valladares.

=== Health ===
Efron sought treatment in early 2013 after struggling with alcoholism and substance abuse. He got sober in June 2013. In November 2013, Efron had to have his jaw wired shut after an injury from a fall at home. He revealed in 2022 that he almost died during this incident, and that it was responsible for his facial swelling, apparent in a viral 2021 video for Bill Nye's Earth Day Musical.

Efron was a vegan for two years until 2022, when he began intermittent fasting, and reintroduced meat into his diet after undergoing a series of food sensitivity tests.

In 2022, Efron opened up about his struggles with insomnia, agoraphobia, and depression. He developed insomnia and depression after taking diuretics for a long period to prepare for his role in Baywatch.

== Filmography ==
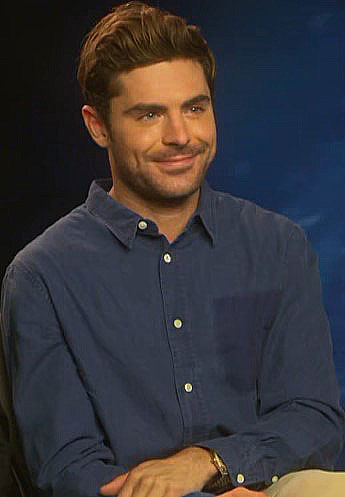
Efron in 2017

=== Film ===
Key
†	Denotes films that have not yet been released

Year	Title	Role	Notes	Ref.
2003	Melinda's World	Stuart Wasser		
2005	The Derby Stallion	Patrick McCardle		
2007	Hairspray	Link Larkin		
2008	High School Musical 3: Senior Year	Troy Bolton		
2008	Me and Orson Welles	Richard Samuels		
2009	17 Again	Mike O'Donnell		
2010	Charlie St. Cloud	Charlie St. Cloud		
2011	New Year's Eve	Paul		
2012	At Any Price	Dean Whipple		
2012	Liberal Arts	Nat		
2012	The Lorax	Ted Wiggins (voice)		
2012	The Lucky One	Logan Thibault		
2012	The Paperboy	Jack Jansen		
2013	Parkland	Dr. Charles James "Jim" Carrico		
2014	Neighbors	Teddy Sanders		
2014	That Awkward Moment	Jason	Also executive producer	
2015	We Are Your Friends	Cole Carter		
2016	Dirty Grandpa	Jason Kelly		
2016	Mike and Dave Need Wedding Dates	Dave Stangle		
2016	Neighbors 2: Sorority Rising	Teddy Sanders		
2017	Baywatch	Matt Brody		
2017	The Disaster Artist	Dan Janjigian / Chris-R		
2017	The Greatest Showman	Phillip Carlyle		
2019	The Beach Bum	Flicker		
2019	Extremely Wicked, Shockingly Evil and Vile	Ted Bundy	Also executive producer	
2020	Scoob!	Fred Jones (voice)		
2021	Save Ralph	Bobby (voice)	Short film	
2021	Dubai Presents: Mission	The Husband	Short film	
2022	Gold	Virgil		
2022	Firestarter	Andy McGee		
2022	The Greatest Beer Run Ever	John "Chickie" Donohue		
2023	The Iron Claw	Kevin Von Erich		
2024	Ricky Stanicky	Dean		
2024	A Family Affair	Chris Cole		
TBA	Famous †	Lance Dunkquist / James Jansen	Post-production	
TBA	Judgment Day †	TBA	Post-production	

=== Television ===
Year(s)	Title	Role(s)	Notes	Ref.
2002	Firefly	Young Simon Tam	Episode: "Safe"	
2003	The Big Wide World of Carl Laemke	Pete Laemke	Television film	
2003	ER	Bobby Neville	Episode: "Dear Abby"	
2004	Miracle Run	Stephen Morgan	Television film	
2004	The Guardian	Luke Tomello	Episode: "Without Consent"	
2004	Triple Play	Harry Fuller	Television film	
2004–2005	Summerland	Cameron Bale	Main role	
2005	CSI: Miami	Seth Dawson	Episode: "Sex & Taxes"	
2006	Heist	Pizza delivery guy	Episode: "Pilot"	
2006	High School Musical	Troy Bolton	Television film	
2006	If You Lived Here, You'd Be Home Now	Cody	Television film	
2006	NCIS	Daniel Austin	Episode: "Deception"	
2006	The Replacements	Davey Hunkerhoff (voice)	Episode: "Davey Hunkerhoff/Ratted Out"	
2006	The Suite Life of Zack & Cody	Trevor	Episode: "Odd Couples"	
2007	High School Musical 2	Troy Bolton	Television film	
2009	Entourage	Himself	Episode: "Security Briefs"	
2009–2016	Robot Chicken	Various roles (voice)	5 episodes	
2019	Human Discoveries	Gary (voice)	Main cast; also executive producer	
2020–2022	Down to Earth with Zac Efron	Himself	Also executive producer	
2025	The Studio	Himself	Episode: "The Missing Reel"	
2028	Angel Heart	TBA	Also executive producer; adaption of same name 1987 film	

=== Music video appearances ===
Year	Title	Performer(s)	Album	Ref.
2005	"Sick Inside"	Hope Partlow	Who We Are	
2007	"Say OK"	Vanessa Hudgens	V	

== Discography ==
=== Singles ===
List of songs, with selected chart positions, showing year released and album name
Title	Year	Peak chart positions									Certifications	Album
Title	Year	US	AUS	CAN	IRE	FRA	NZ	SPA	SWE	UK	Certifications	Album
"Breaking Free" (with Drew Seeley and Vanessa Hudgens)	2006	4	13	—	17	—	4	—	—	9	RIAA: Platinum; BPI: Gold	High School Musical
"You Are the Music in Me" (with Vanessa Hudgens)	2007	31	86	54	12	—	—	—	—	26	RIAA: Gold; BPI: Silver	High School Musical 2
"Gotta Go My Own Way" (with Vanessa Hudgens)	2007	34	—	—	36	—	—	—	—	40	RIAA: Platinum; BPI: Silver	High School Musical 2
"Everyday" (with Vanessa Hudgens)	2007	65	—	—	—	—	—	—	—	59	RIAA: Gold; BPI: Silver	High School Musical 2
"Bet on It"	2007	46	—	93	—	—	—	—	65	—		High School Musical 2
"Right Here, Right Now" (with Vanessa Hudgens)	2008	119	—	—	—	—	—	—	—	137		High School Musical 3: Senior Year
"Rewrite the Stars" (with Zendaya)	2018	70	24	71	21	115	32	82	90	16	RIAA: 3× Platinum; ARIA: 2× Platinum; BPI: 3× Platinum; MC: Gold; RMNZ: Platinum	The Greatest Showman

=== Other charted songs ===
List of songs, with selected chart positions, showing year released and album name
Title	Year	Peak chart positions							Certifications	Album
Title	Year	US	AUS	CAN	IRE	FRA	NZ	UK	Certifications	Album
"Start of Something New" (with Drew Seeley and Vanessa Hudgens)	2006	28	—	—	—	—	—	—	RIAA: Gold; BPI: Silver	High School Musical
"Ladies' Choice"	2007	—	—	—	—	—	—	96		Hairspray
"You Are the Music in Me (Reprise)" (with Ashley Tisdale)	2007	—	—	—	—	—	—	89		High School Musical 2
"Can I Have This Dance" (with Vanessa Hudgens)	2008	98	84	—	—	—	—	81		High School Musical 3: Senior Year
"Just Wanna Be with You" (with Lucas Grabeel, Olesya Rulin, and Vanessa Hudgens)	2008	—	—	—	—	—	—	153		High School Musical 3: Senior Year
"The Boys Are Back" (with Corbin Bleu)	2008	101	72	—	—	—	—	101		High School Musical 3: Senior Year
"The Greatest Show" (with Hugh Jackman, Keala Settle, Zendaya and The Greatest Showman Ensemble)	2017	88	42	—	34	110	— (Note: "The Greatest Show" did not enter the NZ Top 40 Singles Chart, but peaked at number 3 on the NZ Heatseeker Singles Chart.)	20	RIAA: 2× Platinum; ARIA: 2× Platinum; BPI: 3× Platinum	The Greatest Showman
"The Other Side" (with Hugh Jackman)	2017	—	—	—	54	—	—	48	BPI: 2× Platinum; RIAA: Gold; RMNZ: 2× Platinum	The Greatest Showman
"—" denotes releases that did not chart or were not released in that territory.

== Awards and nominations ==
Award	Year of ceremony	Category	Nominated work	Result	Ref.
ASTRA Awards	2008	Favourite International Personality or Actor	High School Musical 2	Nominated	
Critics' Choice Movie Awards	2008	Best Acting Ensemble	Hairspray	Won	
CinemaCon	2016	Comedy Star of the Year (shared with Anna Kendrick and Adam DeVine)	Mike and Dave Need Wedding Dates	Won	
Daytime Emmy Awards	2021	Outstanding Daytime Program Host	Down to Earth with Zac Efron	Won	
Daytime Emmy Awards	2021	Outstanding Travel, Adventure and Nature Program	Down to Earth with Zac Efron	Nominated	
Daytime Emmy Awards	2023	Outstanding Daytime Program Host	Down to Earth with Zac Efron	Nominated	
Daytime Emmy Awards	2023	Outstanding Travel, Adventure and Nature Program	Down to Earth with Zac Efron	Nominated	
Golden Raspberry Awards	2012	Worst Screen Ensemble	New Year's Eve	Nominated	
Golden Raspberry Awards	2018	Worst Actor	Baywatch	Nominated	
Hollywood Film Awards	2007	Ensemble Acting of the Year – Musical/Comedy	Hairspray	Nominated	
MTV Movie Awards	2008	Best Breakthrough Performance	Hairspray	Won	
MTV Movie Awards	2009	Best Male Performance	High School Musical 3: Senior Year	Won	
MTV Movie Awards	2009	Best Kiss (shared with Vanessa Hudgens)	High School Musical 3: Senior Year	Nominated	
MTV Movie Awards	2010	Best Male Performance	17 Again	Nominated	
MTV Movie Awards	2011	Best Male Performance	Charlie St. Cloud	Nominated	
MTV Movie Awards	2014	Best Shirtless Performance	That Awkward Moment	Won	
MTV Movie Awards	2015	Best On-Screen Duo (shared with Dave Franco)	Neighbors	Won	
MTV Movie Awards	2015	Best Shirtless Performance	Neighbors	Won	
MTV Movie Awards	2015	Best Fight (shared with Seth Rogen)	Neighbors	Nominated	
MTV Movie Awards	2015	Best Musical Moment (shared with Seth Rogen)	Neighbors	Nominated	
MTV Movie Awards	2017	Best Kiss (shared with Anna Kendrick)	Mike and Dave Need Wedding Dates	Nominated	
National Board of Review	2023	Best Acting Ensemble	The Iron Claw	Won	
Nickelodeon Australian Kids' Choice Awards	2007	Fave Movie Star	Hairspray	Won	
Nickelodeon Australian Kids' Choice Awards	2009	Fave Movie Star	17 Again	Won	
Nickelodeon Australian Kids' Choice Awards	2010	Cutest Couple (shared with Vanessa Hudgens)	—	Won	
Nickelodeon Kids' Choice Awards	2010	Favorite Movie Actor	17 Again	Nominated	
Nickelodeon UK Kids' Choice Awards	2007	Best TV Actor	High School Musical	Won	
Palm Springs International Film Festival	2008	Best Ensemble Cast	Hairspray	Won	
People's Choice Awards	2009	Favorite Star Under 35	—	Nominated	
People's Choice Awards	2011	Favorite Movie Star Under 25	—	Won	
People's Choice Awards	2013	Favorite Dramatic Movie Actor	The Lucky One	Won	
People's Choice Awards	2015	Favorite Comedic Movie Actor	Neighbors	Nominated	
People's Choice Awards	2017	Favorite Comedic Movie Actor	Neighbors 2: Sorority Rising	Nominated	
Saturn Awards	2019	Best Actor in Streaming Presentation	Extremely Wicked, Shockingly Evil and Vile	Nominated	
Screen Actors Guild Awards	2008	Outstanding Performance by a Cast in a Motion Picture	Hairspray	Nominated	
ShoWest Convention	2009	Breakthrough Performer of the Year	High School Musical 3: Senior Year	Won	
Teen Choice Awards	2006	Choice Breakout TV Star	High School Musical	Won	
Teen Choice Awards	2006	Choice TV Chemistry (shared with Vanessa Hudgens)	High School Musical	Won	
Teen Choice Awards	2007	Choice Male Hottie	—	Won	
Teen Choice Awards	2008	Choice Male Hottie	—	Nominated	
Teen Choice Awards	2008	Choice Red Carpet Fashion Icon – Male	—	Nominated	
Teen Choice Awards	2009	Choice Comedy Movie Actor	17 Again	Won	
Teen Choice Awards	2009	Choice Music/Dance Movie Actor	High School Musical 3: Senior Year	Won	
Teen Choice Awards	2009	Choice Movie Rockstar Moment	17 Again	Won	
Teen Choice Awards	2009	Choice Movie Liplock (shared with Vanessa Hudgens)	High School Musical 3: Senior Year	Nominated	
Teen Choice Awards	2009	Choice Male Hottie	—	Nominated	
Teen Choice Awards	2009	Choice Red Carpet Fashion Icon – Male	—	Nominated	
Teen Choice Awards	2010	Choice Summer Movie Actor	Charlie St. Cloud	Nominated	
Teen Choice Awards	2010	Choice Male Hottie	—	Nominated	
Teen Choice Awards	2010	Choice Red Carpet Fashion Icon – Male	—	Nominated	
Teen Choice Awards	2010	Choice Smile	—	Nominated	
Teen Choice Awards	2011	Choice Red Carpet Fashion Icon – Male	—	Won	
Teen Choice Awards	2012	Choice Drama Movie Actor	The Lucky One	Won	
Teen Choice Awards	2012	Choice Romance Movie Actor	The Lucky One	Won	
Teen Choice Awards	2012	Choice Movie Voice	The Lorax	Nominated	
Teen Choice Awards	2012	Choice Movie Liplock (shared with Taylor Schilling)	The Lucky One	Nominated	
Teen Choice Awards	2014	Choice Male Hottie	—	Nominated	
Teen Choice Awards	2016	Choice Comedy Movie Actor	Neighbors 2: Sorority Rising	Won	
Teen Choice Awards	2016	Choice Movie Hissy Fit	Neighbors 2: Sorority Rising	Nominated	
Teen Choice Awards	2017	Choice Comedy Movie Actor	Baywatch	Won	
Teen Choice Awards	2017	Choice MovieShip (shared with Dwayne Johnson)	Baywatch	Nominated	
Teen Choice Awards	2018	Choice Drama Movie Actor	The Greatest Showman	Won	
Teen Choice Awards	2018	Choice MovieShip (shared with Zendaya)	The Greatest Showman	Won	
Teen Choice Awards	2018	Choice Collaboration (shared with Zendaya for "Rewrite the Stars")	The Greatest Showman	Won	
Teen Choice Awards	2018	Choice Liplock (shared with Zendaya)	The Greatest Showman	Nominated	
Teen Choice Awards	2018	Choice Male Hottie	—	Nominated	
Young Artist Awards	2005	Best Performance in a TV Movie, Miniseries or Special – Supporting Young Actor	Miracle Run	Nominated	
Young Artist Awards	2007	Best Performance in a TV Movie, Miniseries or Special (Comedy or Drama) – Leading Young Actor	High School Musical	Nominated	
Young Hollywood Awards	2014	Best Cast Chemistry – Film	Neighbors	Nominated	
Young Hollywood Awards	2014	Best Threesome (shared with Dave Franco and Christopher Mintz-Plasse)	Neighbors	Nominated	
Young Hollywood Awards	2014	Best Threesome (shared with Miles Teller and Michael B. Jordan)	That Awkward Moment	Nominated	
