= Hear My Heart =

Studio album by Nikki Gil
- Released: May 16, 2008 (Philippines)
- Recorded: 2008
- Genre: R&B, Soul, Pop
- Language: English, Tagalog
- Label: EMI Music Philippines; Poly East Records
- Producer: Christopher Sy (executive); Francis Guevarra

Nikki Gil chronology
Nikki Gil (2005)	Hear My Heart (2008)	Somebody to Love (2010)

Singles from Hear My Heart
- 1. "Hear My Heart" Released: 2008; 2. "Million Miles Away" Released: 2008; 3. "If You're Not the One" Released: 2009

Hear My Heart is the second album of the Filipino singer, actress, host, model and Myx VJ Nikki Gil.

== Track listing ==
All tracks were produced by Francis Guevarra except “Gotta Go My Own Way”, produced by Andy Watts and Adam Dodd.

No.	Title	Writer(s)	Arranger(s)	Length
1.	"Hear My Heart"	Nikki Gil, Danela Gil	Ferdie Marquez	4:50
2.	"When Did You Fall In Love"	Chris Rice	Dan Gil	4:22
3.	"Just Want To Be Your Everything"	Barry Allan Gibb	Bobby Velasco	3:52
4.	"If You're Not The One"	Daniel Bedingfield	Bimbo Yance	4:11
5.	"Don't Let Me Be Lonely Tonight"	James Taylor	Dan Gil	3:16
6.	"Million Miles Away"	Robert More Jr.	Ferdie Marquez	3:51
7.	"So Much In Love"	Dominic Bugati, Frank Musker	Bobby Velasco	3:25
8.	"Let Me Be The One"	Paul Williams, Roger Nichols	Ferdie Marquez	3:30
9.	"Buses & Trains"	James Roche	Eazer Pastor	3:39
10.	"Friday"	Danela Gil		3:03
11.	"On My Knees"	David Mullen, Nicole Coleman-Mullen, Michael Ochs	Karel Honasan	3:45
12.	"Gotta Go My Own Way"	James Roche	Eazer Pastor	3:41

== Album credits ==
- Christopher Sy – executive producer
- Estela Paz Cachapero – domestic label manager
- Francis Guevarra – producer
- Efren San Pedro & Ramil Bahandi – vocals recorded
- Arnie Mendaros – vocal arrangements
- Nikki Gil – back ups
- Arnie Mendaros – back ups
- Ferdie Marquez – mixed & mastered
- Willie A. Manzon – creative Consultant
- Patrick Uy – styling
- Ken & Roman – hair & make-up
- Mark Nicdao – photography
- Abi Goy – album design & illustration
