= Expecting Mary =

- Theatrical release poster
- Directed by: Dan Gordon
- Written by: Dan Gordon
- Produced by: Kim Waltrip
- Starring: Elliott Gould; Linda Gray; Lainie Kazan; Cloris Leachman; Della Reese; Olesya Rulin; Cybill Shepherd; Gene Simmons; Fred Willard
- Cinematography: Michael Goi
- Edited by: Marc Leif
- Music by: Kevin Saunders Hayes
- Release date: January 16, 2010 (Palm Springs)
- Running time: 97 minutes
- Country: United States
- Language: English

Expecting Mary is a 2010 American comedy-drama film starring Elliott Gould, Linda Gray, Lainie Kazan, Cloris Leachman, Della Reese, Olesya Rulin, Cybill Shepherd, Gene Simmons, and Fred Willard. It was written and directed by Dan Gordon (in his feature film directorial debut) and produced by Kim Waltrip with executive producer Jim Casey. The film premiered at the Palm Springs International Film Festival 2010 on January 16 and was selected as the opening film at the California Independent Film Festival on April 22, 2010.

== Premise ==
Mary (Olesya Rulin) is a 16-year-old girl who is 8 months pregnant. She had all the trappings of an upscale life, but ran away from her mother Meg (Cybill Shepherd) and stepfather Phil Cuthbart (Duncan Bravo) who wanted her to get an abortion. It is only when she finds herself in a small New Mexico town in a downtrodden trailer park where she learns the real meaning of love, sacrifice, and family.

== Cast ==
- Olesya Rulin as Mary, a 16-year-old runaway girl who is 8 months pregnant.
- Elliott Gould as Horace Weitzel, a polka-loving truck driver and Darnella's boyfriend.
- Linda Gray as Darnella, a showgirl, trailer park resident, and Horace's girlfriend who befriends Mary.
- Lainie Kazan as Lillian Littlefeather, a casino owner who is the "last of the Kaiyute Indians."
- Cloris Leachman as Annie, a gun-toting octogenarian pig farmer who is Darnella's neighbor.
- Della Reese as Doris Dorkus, the owner of the trailer park that Darnella and Annie live in.
- Cybill Shepherd as Meg, Mary's mother who is a rich businesswoman.
- Gene Simmons as Taylor, Mary's estranged father and rock star who lives in Los Angeles.
- Fred Willard as Jerry Zee, Darnella's agent.
- Duncan Bravo as Phil Cuthbart, Mary's stepfather who is also a lawyer.
- Kathy Lamkin as Molly
- Kinsey Packard as Barbara, a pregnant woman who is Joe's wife.
- Matt Kaminsky as Joe, a man who is Barbara's husband.
- Morgan Krantz as Ryder, a teenager who has been living in the trailer park since his mother lost her job.
- Larry Bates as a police officer
- Teresa Ganzel as Shar D'onnay, Darnella's fellow showgirl.
- Dyana Ortelli as Crystal Lite, Darnella's fellow showgirl.
- Kim Waltrip as an EMT
