= High School Musical 2 (soundtrack) =

2007 soundtrack album

Soundtrack album by High School Musical Cast
- Released: August 14, 2007
- Recorded: 2007
- Genres: Pop; teen pop; dance-pop; electropop
- Length: 37:48
- Label: Walt Disney

High School Musical chronology
High School Musical (2006)	High School Musical 2 (2007)	High School Musical 3: Senior Year (2008)

Singles from High School Musical 2
- 1. "What Time Is It?" Released: July 16, 2007; 2. "I Don't Dance" Released: August 14, 2007; 3. "You Are the Music in Me" Released: September 24, 2007; 4. "Gotta Go My Own Way" Released: October 15, 2007; 5. "Everyday" Released: November 16, 2007; 6. "Bet on It" Released: December 11, 2007

Professional ratings
Review scores
Source	Rating
AllMusic	3/5 stars
Detroit Free Press	2/4 stars
Entertainment Weekly	B+

High School Musical 2 is the soundtrack for the Disney Channel Original Movie of the same name. It was released on August 14, 2007, by Walt Disney Records.

Debuting at number one on the Billboard 200 chart, the album sold 625,000 copies in its initial week of release. As of September 2007, this figure amounted to the fourth-biggest first week sales of the year. It was the first soundtrack of a television movie to debut at the Billboard summit. The album also shipped double platinum (2,000,000) copies in the U.S. in its first week of release. It was the best-selling album of 2007, with sales of over 2.96 million copies in the United States and 6 million copies worldwide. The album won Favorite Soundtrack Album at The American Music Awards of 2007.

== Commercial performance ==
The album was the number-one most downloaded album on iTunes and Amazon.com on its first day of release, and remained so a week later.

The album debuted at number 1 on the U.S. Billboard 200 with sales of 615,000 copies, the fourth best first-week sales of 2007 (trailing behind Linkin Park's Minutes to Midnight, 50 Cent's Curtis, and Kanye West's Graduation). The set also claimed the biggest first-week sales for a television soundtrack. It remained at number-one in its second, third, and fourth weeks, selling 367,000 copies in its second, 210,000 copies in its third, and 165,000 copies in its fourth. The soundtrack is the first album in over two years to spend four consecutive weeks at number 1 on the Billboard 200.

After spending four consecutive weeks at number one on the Billboard 200, the album dropped to number four, following the releases of Kanye West's Graduation, 50 Cent's Curtis, and Kenny Chesney's Just Who I Am: Poets & Pirates, respectively. In its fifteenth week on the Billboard 200, during November 2007, High School Musical 2 returned to the top 10 with a 130% sales increase (183,000 copies), bringing it to number 6 and making it 2007's best-selling album, ahead of Daughtry. However, Daughtry held onto the spot, becoming 2007's biggest selling album. To date, it has sold 3.4 million copies in the US.

== Track listing ==
Standard edition
No.	Title	Writer(s)	Performer(s)	Length
1.	"What Time Is It?"	Matthew Gerrard; Robbie Nevil	Zac Efron, Vanessa Hudgens, Ashley Tisdale, Lucas Grabeel, Corbin Bleu, Monique Coleman	3:19
2.	"Fabulous"	David Lawrence; Faye Greenberg	Tisdale, Grabeel	3:02
3.	"Work This Out"	Randy Petersen; Kevin Quinn	Efron, Hudgens, Bleu, Coleman, Chris Warren Jr., Olesya Rulin, Ryne Sanborn, Kaycee Stroh	3:03
4.	"You Are the Music in Me"	Jamie Houston	Efron, Hudgens	3:28
5.	"I Don't Dance"	Matthew Gerrard; Robbie Nevil	Grabeel, Bleu	3:37
6.	"You Are the Music in Me" (Sharpay version)	Jamie Houston	Tisdale, Efron	2:29
7.	"Gotta Go My Own Way"	Andy Dodd; Adam Watts	Efron, Hudgens	3:42
8.	"Bet on It"	Antonina Armato; Tim James	Efron	3:18
9.	"Everyday"	Jamie Houston	Efron, Hudgens	4:37
10.	"All for One"	Matthew Gerrard; Robbie Nevil	Efron, Hudgens, Tisdale, Grabeel, Bleu, Coleman	4:13
11.	"Humuhumunukunukuapua'a^{[a]}" (bonus track)	David Lawrence; Faye Greenberg	Tisdale, Grabeel	3:09
Total length:				37:48

International digital edition bonus track
No.	Title	Performer(s)	Length
12.	"Breaking Free" (remix)	Efron, Hudgens	3:27
Total length:			41:15

US Target edition bonus tracks
No.	Title	Writer(s)	Performer(s)	Length
12.	"What Time Is It?" (karaoke instrumental)	Matthew Gerrard; Robbie Nevil	Efron, Hudgens, Tisdale, Grabeel, Bleu, Coleman	3:19
13.	"You Are the Music in Me" (Sharpay version – karaoke instrumental)	Jamie Houston	Tisdale, Efron	2:29
Total length:				43:26

Extended Music Edition bonus tracks
No.	Title	Writer(s)	Performer(s)	Length
12.	"I Don't Dance" (remix)	Matthew Gerrard; Robbie Nevil	Grabeel, Bleu	3:34
13.	"Bet on It" (remix)	Antonina Armato; Tim James	Efron	3:24
14.	"Breaking Free" (remix)	Jamie Houston	Efron, Hudgens	3:27
15.	"We're All in This Together" (remix)	Matthew Gerrard; Robbie Nevil	Efron, Hudgens, Tisdale, Grabeel, Bleu, Coleman	3:51
Total length:				52:12

Notes

- ^{^a}"Humuhumunukunukuapua'a" appears as track 5 on the extended music edition of the album.
- Olesya Rulin has uncredited vocals in the intro of "You Are the Music in Me".
- Lucas Grabeel's song "You Got It" is played in the movie, but not featured in the soundtrack.

== Other releases ==
=== High School Musical 2 Non-Stop Dance Party ===
Walt Disney Records released a remix album of all the High School Musical 2 tracks. It was released on December 26, 2007, in the U.S. and on December 24, 2007, in the UK and Southeast Asia. All songs are remixed by Jason Nevins. High School Musical 2: Non-Stop Dance Party reached number-one in the U.S. Top Electronic Albums chart in January 2008.

=== Box set ===
A box set called High School Musical: Hits Collection, was released on November 20, 2007. It includes six discs. They include the High School Musical original soundtrack, High School Musical 2 original soundtrack, High School Musical Karaoke Vol. 1, High School Musical 2 Karaoke Vol. 2 and the High School Musical: The Concert CD/DVD.

=== High School Musical 2: Hindi Version ===
High School Musical 2: Hindi Version

Soundtrack album by Various artists
- Released: October 26, 2007
- Genre: Pop
- Languages: English, Hindi
- Label: Times Music

Times Music from India, launched a special Hindi 2-disc Special Edition Soundtrack of the original High School Musical 2 soundtrack. It contains an extra special disc with three special inspired songs from the famous music director trio Shankar–Ehsaan–Loy. These include "All for One" ("Aaaja Nachle"), "Ud Chale" and "Chhoti Si". These songs were also remixed by DJ Suketu and arranged by Aks. The soundtrack was released (as two disk collection) on October 26, 2007, and the movie (dubbed in Hindi) was aired on Disney Channel India on December 7, 2007. Two music videos from the special disc aired on Disney Channel India. The two are Ud Chale and "All for One" ("Aaja Nachle"). The music video for Ud Chale has three friends and together they explore the night sky. In All for One, many people bring their emotions to dance.

== Chart positions ==
=== Weekly charts ===
Chart (2007-2008)	Peak position
Australian Albums (ARIA)	4
Austrian Albums (Ö3 Austria)	2
Belgian Albums (Ultratop Flanders)	47
Belgian Albums (Ultratop Wallonia)	20
Canadian Albums (Billboard)	1
Danish Albums (Hitlisten)	5
Dutch Albums (Album Top 100)	21
European Top 100 Albums (Billboard)	6
French Albums (SNEP)	12
German Albums (Offizielle Top 100)	5
Greek Albums (IFPI)	10
Hungarian Albums (MAHASZ)	1
Italian Compilation Albums (FIMI)	1
Mexican Albums (AMPROFON)	2
New Zealand Albums (RMNZ)	3
Norwegian Albums (VG-lista)	4
Polish Albums (ZPAV)	2
South African Albums (RISA)	2
Spanish Albums (Promusicae)	2
Swiss Albums (Schweizer Hitparade)	6
UK Compilation Albums (OCC)	1
US Billboard 200	1
US Soundtrack Albums (Billboard)	1

=== Monthly charts ===
Chart (2007)	Peak position
Uruguayan Albums (CUD)	1

=== Year-end charts ===
Chart (2007)	Position
Australian Albums (ARIA)	35
Austrian Albums (Ö3 Austria)	18
Brazilian Albums (ABPD)	8
French Albums (SNEP)	87
German Albums (Offizielle Top 100)	69
Mexican Albums (AMPROFON)	18
New Zealand Albums (RMNZ)	14
Swiss Albums (Schweizer Hitparade)	75
US Billboard 200	8
US Soundtrack Albums (Billboard)	2

Chart (2008)	Position
Austrian Albums (Ö3 Austria)	21
Belgian Albums (Ultratop Wallonia)	89
German Albums (Offizielle Top 100)	49
Mexican Albums (AMPROFON)	87
US Billboard 200	20
US Soundtrack Albums (Billboard)	2

== Certifications and sales ==
Certifications for High School Musical 2
Region	Certification	Certified units/sales
Argentina (CAPIF)	4× Platinum	160,000^{^}
Australia (ARIA)	Platinum	70,000^{^}
Austria (IFPI Austria)	2× Platinum	40,000^{*}
Brazil (Pro-Música Brasil)	2× Platinum	120,000^{*}
Canada (Music Canada)	2× Platinum	200,000^{‡}
Central America	—	20,000
Chile	Platinum	
Colombia	Platinum	
Costa Rica	2× Platinum	
Denmark (IFPI Danmark)	4× Platinum	80,000^{‡}
France (SNEP)	Gold	75,000^{*}
GCC (IFPI Middle East)	Gold	3,000^{*}
Germany (BVMI)	Platinum	200,000^{^}
Hungary (MAHASZ)	Platinum	6,000^{^}
India	Gold	
Indonesia	Gold	
Ireland (IRMA)	3× Platinum	45,000^{^}
Italy (FIMI)	2× Platinum	160,000
Malaysia	Gold	
Mexico (AMPROFON)	Platinum+Gold	150,000^{^}
New Zealand (RMNZ)	2× Platinum	30,000^{^}
Norway (IFPI Norway)	Platinum	40,000^{*}
Philippines (PARI)	3× Platinum	
Poland (ZPAV)	Platinum	20,000^{*}
Portugal (AFP)	Platinum	20,000^{^}
Singapore (RIAS)	Platinum	12,000^{*}
Spain (Promusicae)	Platinum	80,000^{^}
Sweden (GLF)	Gold	20,000^{^}
Switzerland (IFPI Switzerland)	Gold	15,000^{^}
Taiwan (RIT)	Platinum	14,000^{*}
Turkey (Mü-Yap)	Gold	5,000^{*}
United Kingdom (BPI)	2× Platinum	600,000^{^}
United States (RIAA)	4× Platinum	4,000,000^{‡}
Venezuela	Platinum	
Summaries
Europe (IFPI)	Platinum	1,000,000^{*}
^{*} Sales figures based on certification alone.^{^} Shipments figures based on certification alone.^{‡} Sales+streaming figures based on certification alone.

== International versions ==
These are international versions of the songs of High School Musical 2.

Song	Original title	Language	Singer(s)
"¿Qué viene aquí?"	"What Time Is It?"	Spanish	High School Musical: La Selección (Argentina) finalists
"¿Qué viene aquí?"	"What Time Is It?"	Spanish	High School Musical: La Selección (Mexico) finalists
"1+1=11"	"What Time Is It?"	Mandarin Chinese	GoGoClub (兄弟联)
"Que tempo è esse?"	"What Time Is It?"	Portuguese (Brazil)	High School Musical: A Seleção Finalists
"Szerelemnyár"	"What Time Is It?"	Hungarian	Zentai Mark & Rozman Alexandra
"Du er mit livs melodi"	"You Are the Music in Me"	Danish	Rebekka & Simon Matthew
"Ez a mi dalunk már"	"You Are the Music in Me"	Hungarian	Zentai Mark & Rozman Alexandra
"Du er musikken i meg"	"You Are the Music in Me"	Norwegian	Julia Geitvik & Lars Berteig Andersen
"Eres la música en mí"	"You Are the Music in Me"	Spanish	Valeria Gastaldi & Dani Martins (Argentina)
"Eres la música en mí"	"You Are the Music in Me"	Spanish	Roger González & Paulina Holguín García (México)
"Eres la música en mí"	"You Are the Music in Me"	Latin American Spanish	Gaston Vietto & Valeria Baroni (High School Musical: La Selección Argentina)
"You Are the Music in Me"	"You Are the Music in Me"	English (Malaysia)	Vince Chong & Jaclyn Victor
"Kau muzik di hatiku"	"You Are the Music in Me"	Malay	Vince Chong & Jaclyn Victor
"You Are the Music in Me"	"You Are the Music in Me"	Japanese	Nami Tamaki
"Você é a música em mim"	"You Are the Music in Me"	Portuguese (Brazil)	Itauana Ciribelli & Thiago Fragoso
"Du bist wie Musik"	"You Are the Music in Me"	German	Ben & Kate Hall
"De stem van mijn hart"	"You Are the Music in Me"	Dutch	Thomas Berge & Tess Gaerthé
"Tu sei la musica in me"	"You Are the Music in Me"	Italian	Pquadro
"İçimdeki Müzik Sensin"	"You Are the Music in Me"	Turkish	Keremcem
"Moja muzyka to ty"	"You Are the Music in Me"	Polish	Hania Stach & Andrzej Lampert
"Du är musiken i mig"	"You Are the Music in Me"	Swedish	Molly Sandén & Ola Svensson
"Eu não danço"	"I Don't Dance"	Portuguese (Portugal)	Expensive Soul & Bianca
"Eres la música en mí (Sharpay Version)"	"You Are the Music in Me (Sharpay Version)"	Spanish	Sofia Aguero Petros & Walter Bruno
"Eres la música en mí"	"You Are the Music in Me (Sharpay Version)"	Spanish	Mota (Spanish band)
"Você é a música em mim (Sharpay Version)"	"You Are the Music in Me (Sharpay Version)"	Portuguese (Brazil)	Olavo Cavalheiro & Carol Calheiros (High School Musical: A Seleção)
"Mujhe Jaana Hoga"	"Gotta Go My Own Way"	Hindi	Sunidhi Chauhan & Naresh Kamath
"Por mi camino iré"	"Gotta Go My Own Way"	Spanish	Paulina Holguín García
"Gotta Go My Own Way"	"Gotta Go My Own Way"	English (Philippines)	Nikki Gil & Tom Price
"Gotta Go My Own Way"	"Gotta Go My Own Way"	English (Canada)	Nikki Yanofsky
"Vou ser do jeito que eu sou"	"Gotta Go My Own Way"	Portuguese (Brazil)	Lissah Martins feat. Zac Efron
"Ku harus pergi"	"Gotta Go My Own Way"	Indonesia	Hime ft BrandonM
"Savoir qui je suis"	"Gotta Go My Own Way"	French	Lââm
"Je dois tout faire à ma manière"	"Gotta Go My Own Way"	French (Canada)	Nikki Yanofsky
"必殺技" (Bi Sha Ji)	"Bet on It"	Mandarin Chinese (Taiwan)	Show Lo
"Var Misin?"	"Bet on It"	Turkish	Keremcem
"Double mise"	"Bet on It"	French	Willy Denzey
"飛就飛" (Fei Jiu Fei)	"Everyday"	Cantonese	Justin Lo & Kary Ng
"Io e te"	"Everyday"	Italian	Mafy & Pquadro
"Cada vez""	"Everyday"	Spanish	Mariana Magaña & Cristóbal Orellana (High School Musical: La Selección México)
"Cada vez"	"Everyday"	Spanish	Fernando Dente & Agustina Vera (High School Musical: La Selección Argentina)
"Toda vez"	"Everyday"	Portuguese (Brazil)	Moroni Cruz & Beatriz Machado (High School Musical: A Seleção)
"Todo el mundo a bailar"	"All for One"	Spanish	Mota (Spanish band)
"Todos para uno"	"All for One"	Spanish	High School Musical: La Selección (Argentina)
"Aaja Nach Le"	"All for One"	Hindi	Shankar–Ehsaan–Loy
"A nossa vez"	"All for One"	Portuguese (Portugal)	Cidade FM Cast

== See also ==
- High School Musical 2
- High School Musical
- High School Musical: El Desafio
