= MTV Movie Award for Best Shirtless Performance =

This is a following list for the MTV Movie Award winners for Best Shirtless Performance. The award was first given out in 2013, and was last given out in 2015.

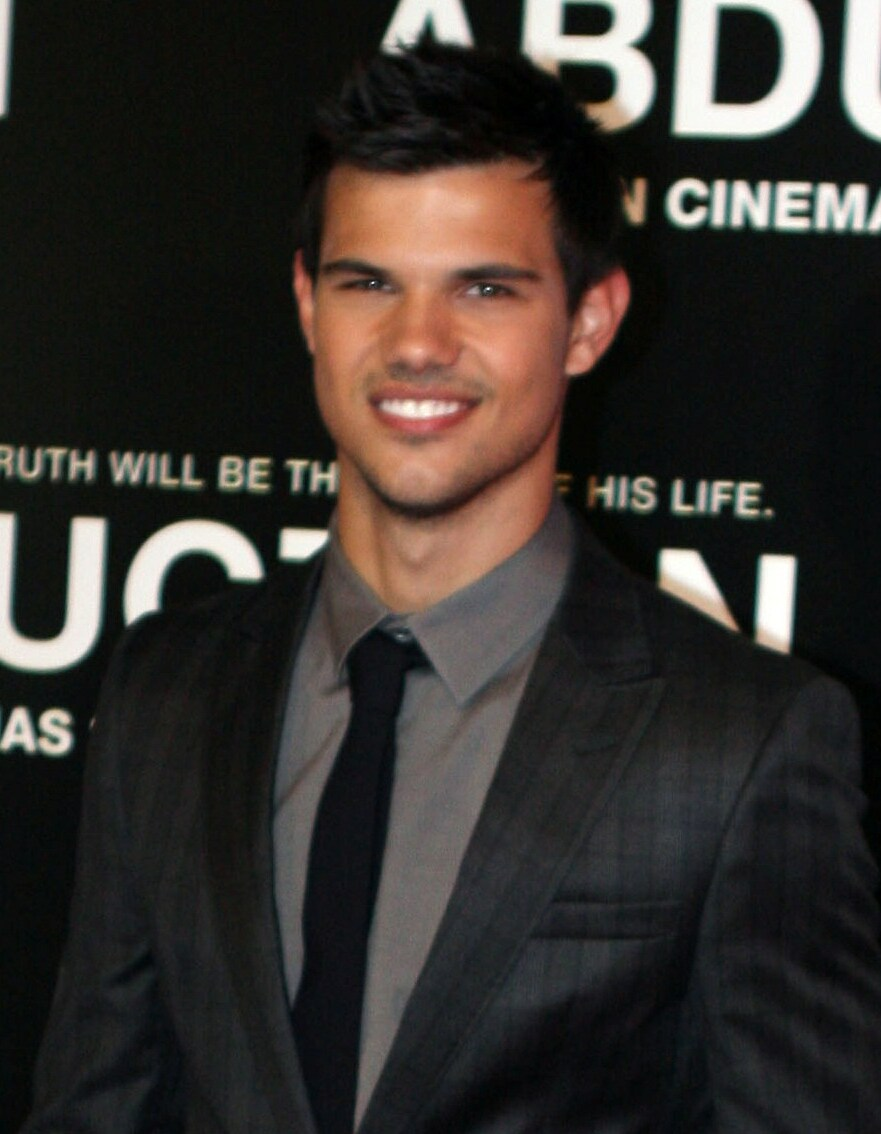
2013 winner Taylor Lautner on his shirtless scene in The Twilight Saga: Breaking Dawn - Part 2

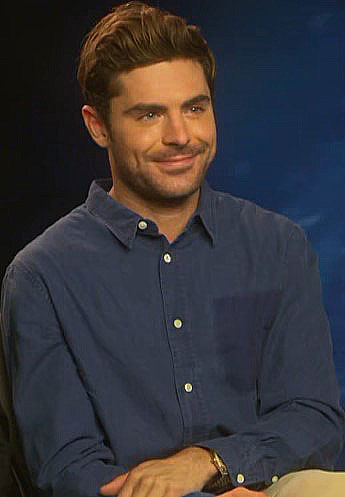
2 times winner in 2014 and 2015 Zac Efron on his viral shirtless scenes in That Awkward Moment and Neighbors

Year	Actor	Nominated	Ref.
2013	Taylor Lautner –The Twilight Saga: Breaking Dawn – Part 2	Channing Tatum – Magic Mike; Christian Bale – The Dark Knight Rises; Daniel Craig – Skyfall; Seth MacFarlane – Ted	
2014	Zac Efron –That Awkward Moment	Chris Hemsworth – Thor: The Dark World; Jennifer Aniston – We're the Millers; Leonardo DiCaprio – The Wolf of Wall Street; Sam Claflin – The Hunger Games: Catching Fire	
2015	Zac Efron –Neighbors	Ansel Elgort – The Fault in Our Stars; Channing Tatum – Foxcatcher; Chris Pratt – Guardians of the Galaxy; Kate Upton – The Other Woman	
