= Flying By =

- Poster
- Written by: Jim Amatulli; Oscar Jarnicki
- Directed by: Jim Amatulli
- Starring: Billy Ray Cyrus; Heather Locklear; Olesya Rulin; Patricia Neal
- Original language: English

Production
- Production company: Stu Segall Productions

Original release
- Release: April 18, 2009

Flying By is a 2009 drama film directed by Jim Amatulli and starring Billy Ray Cyrus, Heather Locklear, Olesya Rulin, and Patricia Neal. It was the final film for Patricia Neal.

== Plot ==
A real estate developer goes to his 25th high school reunion without his wife, and finds his old teenage band playing. They get him up on stage for a couple of songs, and convince him come to a rehearsal. His wife is outraged that he played. His daughter thinks it's kind of cool. His mother, in a retirement home, encourages him to enjoy life. He feels some temporary relief from the pressures of business complexities and the stress of marriage tensions. The band gets booked at a popular bar, which leads to a last minute booking to open for a reunion tour, with the possibility of additional tour dates. But the band has internal conflicts. He faces a tough decision to give it a shot even though it will affect his marriage, his family, particularly his daughter, and his business.

== Notable cast ==
- Billy Ray Cyrus as George Barron
- Heather Locklear as Pamela
- Olesya Rulin as Ellie
- Patricia Neal as Margie
- Eric Allan Kramer as Steve
- David Haack as Alan
- Sidney Franklin as Young Willy
