= Apart (2011 film) =

- Film poster
- Directed by: Aaron Rottinghaus
- Written by: Aaron Rottinghaus
- Produced by: Ryan Rettig
- Starring: Olesya Rulin; Josh Danziger
- Cinematography: J.P. Lipa
- Edited by: Aaron Rottinghaus
- Music by: Phillip James Gilberti
- Release dates: March 2011 (SXSW); March 9, 2012 (United States)
- Running time: 85 minutes
- Country: United States
- Language: English
- Box office: $3,161

Apart is a 2011 American drama film directed by Aaron Rottinghaus.

Noah Greene and Emily Gates share the same psychological affliction: induced delusional disorder, or folie à deux. They must uncover the mystery of a tragic past in order to find hope in the future. The director, Aaron Rottinghaus, noted in an interview at SXSW 2011 that the film is based on actual case studies of induced delusional disorder.

== Cast ==
- Olesya Rulin as Emily Gates
- Josh Danziger as Noah Greene
- Bruce McGill as Dr. Thomas Abner
- Joey Lauren Adams as Dr. Jan Sheppard
- Michael Bowen as Teddy Berg
- Sue Rock as Julie Gates
- David Born as Joseph Greene
- Jason Davis (actor) as Oliver Greene
- Shiree Nelson as Kelly Corrigan
