= Everyday (High School Musical song) =

2007 single by Zac Efron and Vanessa Hudgens

Single by Zac Efron and Vanessa Hudgens

from the album High School Musical 2
- Released: November 16, 2007
- Recorded: 2007
- Genre: Pop
- Length: 4:38
- Label: Walt Disney
- Songwriter: Jamie Houston
- Producer: Houston

High School Musical singles chronology
"Gotta Go My Own Way" (2007)	"Everyday" (2007)	"Bet on It" (2007)

Zac Efron singles chronology
"Gotta Go My Own Way" (2007)	"Everyday" (2007)	"Bet on It" (2007)

Vanessa Hudgens singles chronology
"Gotta Go My Own Way" (2007)	"Everyday" (2007)	"Sneakernight" (2008)

"Everyday" is a song from the Disney Channel Original Movie High School Musical 2. It is featured on the soundtrack of the film and performed by Zac Efron and Vanessa Hudgens as Troy Bolton and Gabriella Montez.

== Composition ==
AllMusic gave a critical review of the song, writing "the soundtrack closes with 'Everyday' and 'All for One,' two wannabe rousing songs that blend into one big, bland singalong." Brian McCollum of Detroit Free Press considered it one of the "requisite ballads", which he commented "ensure that the tempo stays brisk enough to indulge seventh-grade attention spans."

== Charts ==
Chart (2007–2008)	Peak position
Canadian Digital Song Sales (Billboard)	64
Germany (GfK)	67
Ireland (IRMA)	47
Italy (FIMI)	48
Switzerland (Schweizer Hitparade)	81
UK Singles (OCC)	59
US Billboard Hot 100	65
US Pop 100 (Billboard)	46

== Certifications ==
Region	Certification	Certified units/sales
United Kingdom (BPI)	Silver	200,000^{‡}
United States (RIAA)	Gold	500,000^{‡}
^{‡} Sales+streaming figures based on certification alone.
