= That Awkward Moment =

2014 American romantic comedy-drama film by Tom Gormican

- Theatrical release poster
- Directed by: Tom Gormican
- Written by: Tom Gormican
- Produced by: Justin Nappi; Andrew O'Connor; Scott Aversano; Kevin Turen
- Starring: Zac Efron; Miles Teller; Michael B. Jordan; Imogen Poots; Mackenzie Davis; Jessica Lucas
- Cinematography: Brandon Trost
- Edited by: Shawn Paper; Greg Tillman
- Music by: David Torn
- Production companies: Treehouse Pictures; Aversano Films; What If It Barks Films; Ninjas Runnin' Wild Productions; Virgin Produced
- Distributed by: Focus Features
- Release dates: January 27, 2014 (Los Angeles); January 31, 2014 (United States)
- Running time: 94 minutes
- Country: United States
- Language: English
- Budget: $8 million
- Box office: $53.1 million

That Awkward Moment (released as Are We Officially Dating? in Australia, Indonesia, and New Zealand) is a 2014 American bromantic comedy drama film written and directed by Tom Gormican in his directorial debut. The film stars Zac Efron, Miles Teller, Michael B. Jordan, Imogen Poots, Mackenzie Davis, and Jessica Lucas. The film had its Los Angeles premiere on January 27, 2014, and it was widely released on January 31 in the United States.

== Plot ==
Jason sits on a bench in New York City waiting for someone to arrive. Jason's voiceover explains that he has been waiting for a long time, but to explain why, he needs to go back to the beginning. Jason tells the audience that every relationship reaches the "So..." moment, where someone in the relationship will want to take the relationship to a more serious place. At that point, Jason knows the relationship is over, as he is not ready for a serious relationship.

Jason works with his best friend Daniel at a publishing house designing book covers. Their doctor friend Mikey, who has been married since the end of college, comes to them after his wife Vera requests a divorce. They decide to go out to a bar and celebrate Mikey now being single. The group meets up with Daniel's female wingman, Chelsea, as they try to get Mikey's mind off of his wife. Mikey meets a girl with glasses, while Jason meets Ellie, and hits it off with her after teasing another man that was trying to buy her a drink. Mikey gets "Glasses" number, but puts off calling her, resolving to work it out with Vera. Jason sleeps with Ellie, but leaves her apartment in a hurry after jumping to the mistaken conclusion that she is a prostitute.

The next day, Jason and Daniel make a book cover pitch to a new author, who happens to be Ellie. Ellie is hurt and enraged that he did not stay the whole night. Jason tries to make it up to her, but she refuses. Jason, Daniel and Mikey then make a pact to stay single together for the foreseeable future.

Shortly after, Jason sends an apology letter under the form of a comic strip to Ellie, who accepts the apology, and they start seeing each other on a regular basis. Meanwhile, Daniel begins to fall for Chelsea, and the two begin seeing one another. Additionally, Mikey meets with Vera, and when she claims that the reason their marriage fell apart is because he is not spontaneous enough, Mikey kisses her, and the two sleep together in the hospital, reigniting their romance. All three friends attempt to keep their relationships a secret, due to their earlier agreement that they would stay single.

Jason steals a key to open the gates to Gramercy Park, then gives the key to Ellie. They sleep together again, and continue seeing each other. Ellie meets Mikey and Daniel, who both really like her, but they remind Jason of their deal. Jason then meets Ellie’s father at a party thrown by Ellie, and they get along really well. However, shortly after, Ellie’s father dies.

The relationships all come to a head during Thanksgiving, a time that the three friends usually spend together, but varying circumstances keep them apart. Jason agrees to attend a funeral for Ellie's recently passed father, Mikey plans a Thanksgiving dinner with Vera, and Daniel attends the traditional Thanksgiving feast with Chelsea, free to openly tell the guests about their relationship.

Jason ultimately decides not to attend the funeral, not ready to fully commit to Ellie, and their relationship falls apart. Mikey has a serious conversation with Vera during their dinner, causing her to admit that she no longer loves him. Jason and Mikey head to the dinner where they discover Daniel's relationship with Chelsea, and when he denies that they are dating, his relationship falls apart as well. Although the three fight about having kept their relationships secret, they repair their friendship and try to recover their relationships.

Mikey calls "Glasses", setting up a date, and Daniel reunites with Chelsea after being hit by a taxi and ending up in the hospital. However, Jason has still not reconciled with Ellie, despite still being in love with her. Two months later, Mikey and Daniel help Jason by encouraging him to tell her of his love at her weekly book readings, which are usually sparsely attended. However, upon their arrival, the reading is full and Jason is unable to figure out a way to talk with her. He decides to make a scene by improvising a book reading, referencing their first meeting and requesting that they start over by meeting in Gramercy Park.

Returning to the beginning, Jason is waiting for Ellie in Gramercy Park. Four hours later, Ellie joins him on the bench, and Jason begins with "So..."

== Cast ==
- Zac Efron as Jason
- Miles Teller as Daniel
- Michael B. Jordan as Mikey
- Imogen Poots as Ellie Andrews
- Mackenzie Davis as Chelsea
- Jessica Lucas as Vera
- Addison Timlin as Alana
- Josh Pais as Fred
- John Rothman as Chelsea's Father
- Tina Benko as Ellie's Mom
- Barbara Garrick as Chelsea's Mother
- Alysia Reiner as Amanda Silverman
- Kate Simses as "Glasses"
- D. B. Woodside as Vera's Lawyer
- Emily Meade as Christy
- Joseph Adams as Ellie's Dad

== Production ==
That Awkward Moment was developed by What If It Barks Films and was originally titled Are We Officially Dating?, the title it was released under in New Zealand, Indonesia, and Australia. The script was featured as one of the top comedy screenplays in the 2010 Hollywood Black List of best un-produced screenplays. In September 2013, the film's title changed to That Awkward Moment.

Zac Efron was the first cast member to be announced in August 2012, alongside an announcement that production would begin in New York City in November 2012. Miles Teller was reported to have joined the cast in October 2012, with Imogen Poots and Michael B. Jordan following in November 2012.

== Release ==
In June 2013, the U.S. distribution rights for That Awkward Moment were acquired by FilmDistrict with a wide release set for January 31, 2014. Because of a transition of FilmDistrict properties to Focus Features, That Awkward Moment was later absorbed by the reconstituted Focus Features for its January 2014 release.

The first red band trailer was released on October 14, 2013.

=== Critical response ===
That Awkward Moment received mostly negative reviews from critics. Rotten Tomatoes gives the film an approval rating of 23% based on reviews from 142 critics, with an average rating of 4.10 out of 10. The site's consensus is: "Formulaic and unfunny, That Awkward Moment wastes a charming cast on a contrived comedy that falls short of the date movies it seems to be trying to subvert." On Metacritic, the film has a weighted average score of 36 out of 100, based on reviews from 33 critics, indicating "generally unfavorable reviews".

Scott Foundas of Variety wrote: "The pic falls well short of its efforts to combine the raucous vulgarity of the "Hangover" movies with Cameron Crowe-ish depth of feeling." Peter Travers of Rolling Stone complained that the film was full of clichés but that "The compensation comes in the three lead actors, all way too good for the material dished out by writer-director Tom Gormican." Stephen Holden of The New York Times called it "A vile, witless sex comedy."

=== Accolades ===
Zac Efron won an award for this performance at the 2014 MTV Movie Awards for Best Shirtless Performance.
