= Olesya Rulin =

Russian-American actress

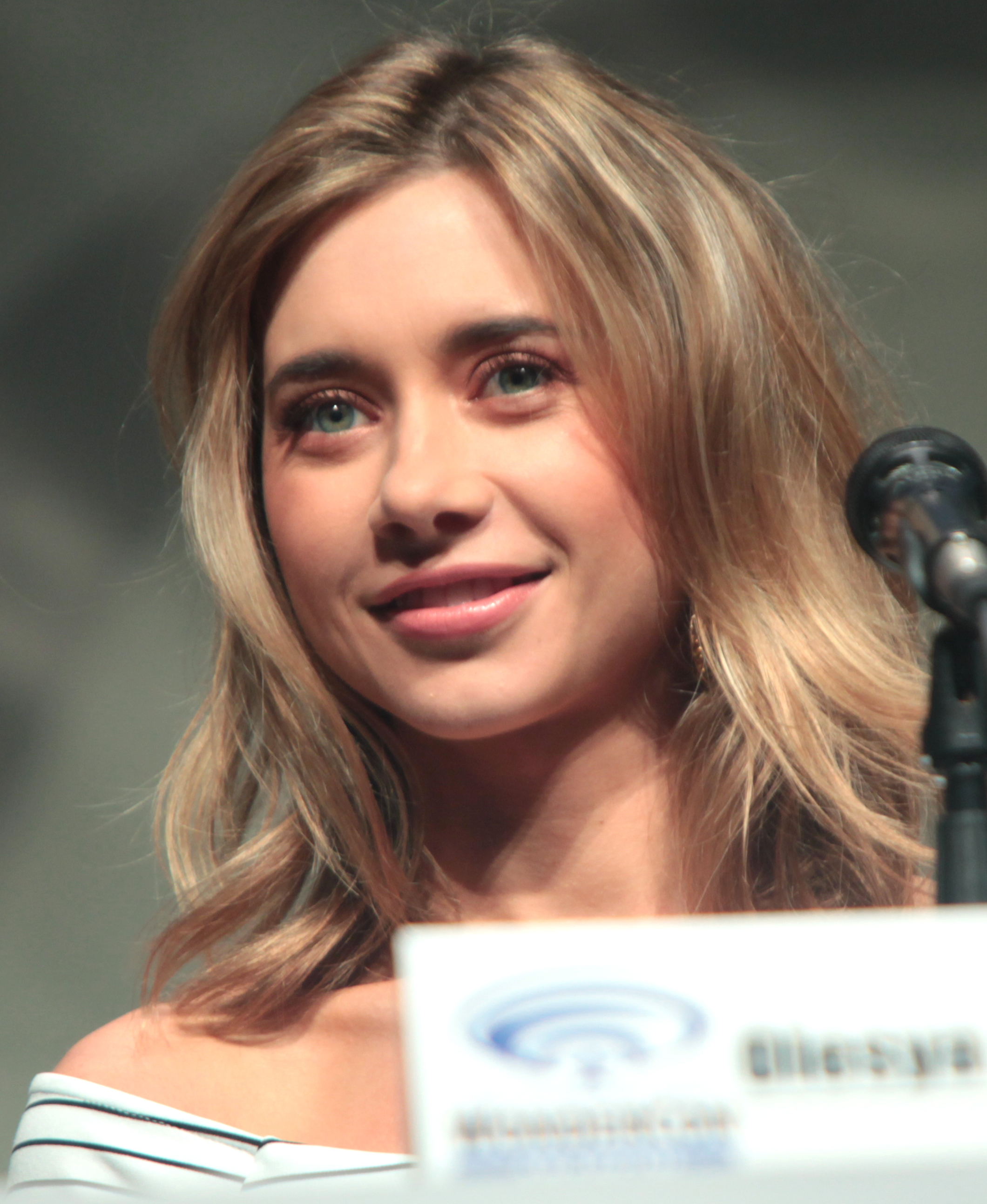
- Rulin at WonderCon 2015
- Born: Olesya Yurivna Rulina; March 17, 1986 (age 40); Moscow, Russian SFSR, Soviet Union (now Russia)
- Citizenship: Russia; United States
- Occupations: Actress; ballet dancer
- Years active: 2001–present
- Spouse: Joseph Noel Pauline (m. 2021)
- Children: 1

Olesya Yurivna Rulina (Russian: Oлeся Юрьевна Рулина; born March 17, 1986) is a Russian and American actress. She is best known for co-starring in all three films of the High School Musical franchise as Kelsi Nielsen. She also starred in the films Private Valentine: Blonde & Dangerous (2008), Flying By (2009), Expecting Mary (2010), and Family Weekend (2013).

== Early life ==
Olesya Rulin was born in Moscow, Russian SFSR, Soviet Union (now Russia). She spent her early childhood in Likhoslavl.

When Rulin was eight, she immigrated to the United States to rejoin her father who had done so two years earlier. They first lived in Texas, then later in Utah. Rulin graduated from West Jordan High School in 2005.

Rulin is also a trained ballet dancer. When she was 12, she entered a model-search contest at the urging of her mother and won representation by four different agencies. She can also play the piano.

Prior to acting full-time, she worked for a year as a certified nursing assistant and also at stores such as Victoria's Secret; she was working at a Nordstrom store when the first High School Musical came out. She was studying economics in Paris when the casting for High School Musical 2 took place.

== Acting career ==
In addition to her role in High School Musical, High School Musical 2 and High School Musical 3: Senior Year, Rulin's credits include the Disney Channel original films Halloweentown High, The Poof Point and Hounded, the television series Everwood and the feature films Forever Strong, Mobsters and Mormons and The Dance.

Rulin's part in High School Musical 2 was significantly larger than that in the first film, including a solo in "You Are the Music in Me" and a few lines in "Work This Out." Rulin reprised her role as Kelsi Nielsen in High School Musical 3: Senior Year, also with a larger part, and performed three songs, including a duet with Lucas Grabeel.

Rulin co-starred with Jessica Simpson in the film Major Movie Star (released in the United States under the title Private Valentine: Blonde & Dangerous). In 2009, Rulin co-starred with Billy Ray Cyrus and Heather Locklear in the drama film Flying By.

In 2010, Rulin starred in Expecting Mary, which also starred Elliott Gould, Linda Gray, Lainie Kazan, Cloris Leachman, Della Reese, Cybill Shepherd, Gene Simmons and Fred Willard.

In 2013, she starred in Family Weekend with Kristin Chenoweth and Matthew Modine.

In August 2014, it was announced that Rulin would be playing the role of Callista Secor in the PlayStation Network series Powers, which ran for two seasons from 2015 to 2016.

== Personal life ==
On November 11, 2021, Rulin married entrepreneur Joseph Noel Pauline.

In August 2022, the couple announced that they had welcomed their first child, a daughter.

== Filmography ==
=== Film ===
Year	Title	Role	Notes
2005	Urban Legends: Bloody Mary	Mindy	Direct-to-video
2005	Mobsters and Mormons	Julie Jaymes	
2006	High School Musical	Kelsi Nielsen	
2006	Vampire Chicks with Chainsaws	Sariah	Direct-to-video
2007	American Pastime	Cathy Reyes	
2007	High School Musical 2	Kelsi Nielsen	
2007	The Dance	Britney	
2008	Forever Strong	Emily's Friend	
2008	Private Valentine: Blonde & Dangerous	Petrovich	
2008	High School Musical 3: Senior Year	Kelsi Nielsen	
2009	Chuckle Boy	Assistant	Short film
2009	Flying By	Ellie	Direct-to-video
2010	Expecting Mary	Mary	
2011	Apart	Emily Gates	
2011	A Thousand Cuts	Melanie	
2013	Family Weekend	Emily Smith-Dungy	

=== Television ===
Year	Title	Role	Notes
2001	Hounded	Girl #1	Television film
2001	The Poof Point	Annie	Television film
2002	Touched by an Angel	High School Student	Episode: "Bring on the Rain"
2004	Halloweentown High	Natalie the Pink Troll	Television film
2004	Everwood	The Drunk Girl	Episode: "No Sure Thing"
2009–2011	Greek	Abby	Recurring role, 10 episodes
2010	CSI: Miami	Andrea Williams	Episode: "Mommie Deadest"
2010	The Mentalist	Sam Starks	Episode: "The Red Ponies"
2011	Drop Dead Diva	Mia Dalton	Episode: "He Said, She Said"
2012	Touch	Girl in the Red Dress	Episode: "Safety in Numbers"
2012	Dirty Work	Bambi	Episode: "Temporary Midnight"
2013	Underemployed	Pixie Dexter	2 episodes
2014	NCIS	Kim Troutman	Episode: "Page Not Found"
2015–2016	Powers	Calista Secor	Main role
2015	The Night Shift	Maya	Episode: "Darkest Before Dawn"
2017	Family Guy	Russian Meg Griffin Double (voice)	Episode: "A House Full of Peters"
2018	Devious Nanny	Amber Deschanel	Television film; also known as Nanny Betrayal
2019	SEAL Team	Jenna Robertson	Episode: "Things Not Seen"
2020–2022	NCIS: Los Angeles	Zasha Gagrin	5 episodes
2022	The Rookie	Danielle Bloomfield	Episode: "Backstabbers"
2023	Black Bags	Tess	Television film
