= I Don't Dance (High School Musical song) =

- Remix artwork

Single by Lucas Grabeel and Corbin Bleu

from the album High School Musical 2
- Released: August 14, 2007
- Recorded: 2007
- Genre: Dance-pop; jazz fusion; R&B
- Length: 3:37
- Label: Walt Disney
- Songwriters: Matthew Gerrard; Robbie Nevil; Giancarlo Binando
- Producer: Matthew Gerrard

High School Musical singles chronology
"What Time Is It?" (2007)	"I Don't Dance" (2007)	"You Are the Music in Me" (2007)

Corbin Bleu singles chronology
"Deal with It" (2006)	"I Don't Dance" (2007)	"Moments That Matter" (2008)

"I Don't Dance" is a song performed by actor-singers Lucas Grabeel and Corbin Bleu in the television movie High School Musical 2, released in 2007. It is one of seven songs from the soundtrack High School Musical 2 to reach the Billboard Hot 100. It was also named as the official theme song for the 2007 Little League World Series.

== Reception ==
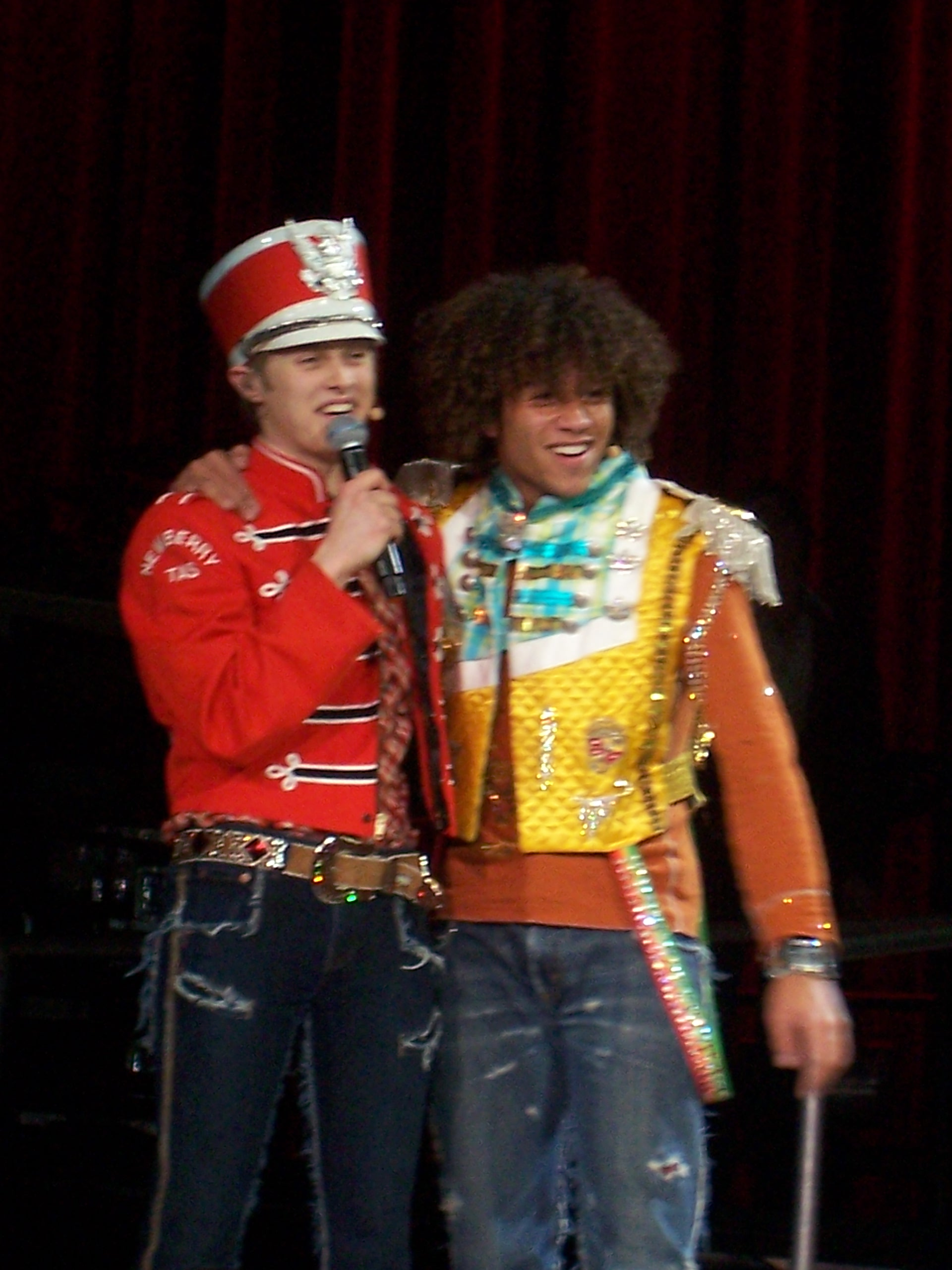
Grabeel and Bleu performing in Rochester, New York, in 2007.

The Village Voice's Tom Breihan called the song "the movie's best dance-number" and commented how the routine managed to "include rapping and swing-dancing, which sort of blew [his] mind." Reviewer Erin Nolan referred to the song as "insanely catchy." Not all reviews were positive though. Writing for The New York Times, Kelefa Sanneh called the tune "excruciating," whereas Virginia Heffernan felt that the music was "a superb idea, as it plays off both the Latinization of the major leagues (by letting a little salsa into the hip-hop) and the spectacular pitcher-batter operetta showdowns of recent seasons," but that the camera work let the scene down noting that "viewers never get a sustained look at the choreography ... and for that reason it’s hard to appreciate specific dancers or their clever configuration."

I Don't Dance is known for having a strong queer subtext between Chad and Ryan. This interpretation was intended by Kenny Ortega, the director of the film, who stated that he "made subtle choices to hint at Ryan's sexuality". The two characters swap outfits at the end of the song.

== Promotional video ==
The promotional video for the song blends scenes from the movie's dance sequence with clips of notable Major League Baseball players including Ryan Howard, Cole Hamels, Jimmy Rollins, Jake Peavy, Justin Verlander, Craig Biggio, David Eckstein, So Taguchi, Bronson Arroyo, CC Sabathia, Nick Swisher, Jeff Francoeur, Brian McCann, B.J. Upton, Bill Hall, J. J. Hardy, Luis Gonzalez, Takashi Saito, Torii Hunter, Shane Victorino, and Nomar Garciaparra. The video was shown in Major and Minor League ballparks throughout the country during the summer of 2007, and it was showcased on The Baseball Youth Road Trip, a summer tour presented by the Major League Baseball Players Association stopping at youth baseball tournaments and Minor League Baseball parks. The I Don't Dance music video shown at over sixty youth baseball events during the Road Trip, culminating at the Little League World Series, where it served as the theme song for the games.

== Formats and track listings ==
A promotional CD single for the song was released in Portugal but without an English version of "I Don't Dance" and a music video was also made. The music video can be seen on High School Musical 2 2-Disc Deluxe Dance Edition DVD.

No.	Title	Length
1.	"Eu Não Danço (Expensive Soul feat. Bianca)"	03:30
2.	"Eu Não Danço (Music video, computer track)"	03:35

== Chart performance ==
The song made its debut on the Billboard Hot 100 at number 74 in the chart for September 1, 2007.

=== Weekly charts ===
Chart (2007)	Peak position
Australia (ARIA)	93
Canada Hot 100 (Billboard)	81
UK Singles (Official Charts)	57
US Billboard Hot 100	70
US Pop 100 (Billboard)	50

== Certifications ==
Certifications for I Don't Dance
Region	Certification	Certified units/sales
United States (RIAA)	Gold	500,000^{‡}
^{‡} Sales+streaming figures based on certification alone.
