= Bet on It =

2007 single by Zac Efron

Single by Zac Efron

from the album High School Musical 2
- Released: December 11, 2007
- Recorded: 2007
- Genre: Teen pop
- Length: 3:18
- Label: Walt Disney
- Songwriter(s): Antonina Armato; Tim James
- Producer(s): Armato; James

High School Musical singles chronology
"Everyday" (2007)	"Bet on It" (2007)	"Now or Never" (2008)

Zac Efron singles chronology
"Everyday" (2007)	"Bet on It" (2007)	"Right Here, Right Now" (2008)

"Bet on It" is a song from the Disney Channel Original Movie High School Musical 2. It is featured on the soundtrack of the film and performed by Zac Efron as Troy Bolton.

== Composition ==
"Bet on It" has been described as an "almost-rock" song, having a "nervous, Michael Jackson-esque hook".

== Critical reception ==
Chris Willman of Entertainment Weekly had a positive reaction to the song, calling it a "terrific crisis-of-conscience number".

== Charts ==
Chart (2007)	Peak position
Canada (Canadian Hot 100)	93
Switzerland (Schweizer Hitparade)	89
UK Singles (OCC)	65
US Billboard Hot 100	46
US Pop 100 (Billboard)	35

== Certifications ==
Region	Certification	Certified units/sales
United Kingdom (BPI)	Silver	200,000^{‡}
United States (RIAA)	Platinum	1,000,000^{‡}
^{‡} Sales+streaming figures based on certification alone.
