= You Are the Music in Me =

2007 High School Musical 2 single

Single by Zac Efron and Vanessa Hudgens

from the album High School Musical 2
- B-side: "You Are the Music in Me" (Instrumental)
- Released: September 24, 2007
- Recorded: 2007
- Genre: Pop
- Length: 3:27
- Label: Walt Disney
- Songwriter: Jamie Houston
- Producer: Jamie Houston

High School Musical singles chronology
"I Don't Dance" (2007)	"You Are the Music in Me" (2007)	"Gotta Go My Own Way" (2007)

Zac Efron singles chronology
"Breaking Free" (2006)	"You Are the Music in Me" (2007)	"Gotta Go My Own Way" (2007)

Vanessa Hudgens singles chronology
"Say OK" (2007)	"You Are the Music in Me" (2007)	"Gotta Go My Own Way" (2007)

"You Are the Music in Me" is the third single released from the Disney Channel Original Movie, High School Musical 2.

== Original version ==
=== Music video ===
The music video is just the clip that was in the movie that featured the song, but in a different edit. There is no new music video was made for it but the clip taken from the movie was used for promotion. It begins with Kelsi, Gabriella, and Troy singing at the piano that ends with some of the other cast coming in and singing along and clips from the first movie (High School Musical) featuring Gabriella and Troy are inserted in.

=== Charts ===
Chart (2007)	Peak position
Australia (ARIA)	86
Canada Hot 100 (Billboard)	54
Germany (GfK)	75
Ireland (IRMA)	12
Scottish Singles Sales (Official Charts)	20
Switzerland (Schweizer Hitparade)	75
UK Singles (Official Charts)	26
US Billboard Hot 100	31
US Pop 100 (Billboard)	28

=== Certifications ===
Region	Certification	Certified units/sales
United Kingdom (BPI)	Silver	200,000^{‡}
United States (RIAA)	Gold	500,000^{‡}
^{‡} Sales+streaming figures based on certification alone.

=== Track listing ===
- UK CD single
1. "You Are the Music in Me" (Zac Efron and Vanessa Hudgens)
2. "You Are the Music in Me" (Instrumental)

== Sharpay version ==
"You Are the Music in Me (Reprise)"

Song by Ashley Tisdale and Zac Efron

from the album High School Musical 2
- Released: August 13, 2007
- Recorded: 2007
- Genre: Pop, power pop
- Length: 2:29
- Label: Walt Disney
- Songwriter: Jamie Houston
- Producer: Jamie Houston

A version sung by the character Sharpay appears as an additional track and is called as "You Are the Music In Me (Sharpay Version) or (Reprise)" is the sixth song for the soundtrack album for the Disney Channel Original Movie of the same name.

=== Song information ===
This song is "You Are the Music In Me" in a more-upbeat version. Sharpay takes this song from Gabriella and Troy when she tricks Troy into singing with her in the talent show. The song contains instruments, including piano, drums and guitars.

The song was used in the movie High School Musical 2 in the scene when Troy and Gabriella's relationship is exhausted when Troy sees Ryan with Gabriella, causing jealousy. Giving to a "promise" from Troy, he and Sharpay practice their song for the Midsummer Night's Talent Show. Amazon's editors stated that "The song "You Are the Music in Me" is a fine one and doesn't get bogged down in syrup. It also gets reprised by Troy and Sharpay in a rockier and arguably better version."

It was supposed to be sung at the Midsummer Night's Talent Show but since Sharpay was unable to come on stage due to absence and Troy on his own, the song never got sung.

=== Official versions ===
1. "You Are the Music in Me (Sharpay Version)" (Album Version) — 2:29
2. "You Are the Music in Me (Sharpay Version)" (Instrumental Version) — 2:29
3. "You Are the Music in Me (Sharpay Version)" (Jason Nevins Non-Stop Dance Remix) — 3:31

=== Charts ===
Chart (2007)	Peak position
UK Singles (Official Charts)	89

== Other versions ==
=== Malaysian version ===
The Malaysian Version was sung by Vince Chong and Jaclyn Victor.

=== Spanish versions ===
Disney Latinoamérica released two versions of the song in Spanish.

==== Mexican version ====
The Mexican Version was sung by Paulina Holgiun and Roger Gonzalez.

==== Ríoplatense version ====
Aside from the one released for the Mexican audience, Disney Latinoamérica also released a version for Argentine and Colombian markets. The version was sung by Dani Martin and Valeria Gastaldi.

=== Molly Sandén and Ola Svensson version ===
"Du Är Musiken I Mig"

Single by Molly Sandén and Ola Svensson

from the album High School Musical 2 (Swedish)
- Released: September 2007
- Recorded: 2007
- Genre: Pop
- Songwriter: Jamie Houston

Ola Svensson singles chronology
"Natalie" (2007)	"Du Är Musiken I Mig" (2007)	"S.O.S." (2007)

Music video
- "Du är musiken i mig" on YouTube

Molly Sandén and Ola Svensson released a Swedish language version of the song entitled "Du är musiken i mig" that reached number 21 in the Swedish Singles Chart and stayed on the chart for a total of 16 weeks.

Chart (2007)	Peak position
Sweden (Sverigetopplistan)	21
