= Gotta Go My Own Way =

2007 single by Vanessa Hudgens and Zac Efron

Single by Zac Efron and Vanessa Hudgens

from the album High School Musical 2
- Released: October 15, 2007
- Recorded: 2007
- Genre: Pop
- Length: 3:42
- Label: Walt Disney
- Songwriters: Andy Dodd; Adam Watts
- Producers: Dodd; Watts

High School Musical singles chronology
"You Are the Music in Me" (2007)	"Gotta Go My Own Way" (2007)	"Everyday" (2007)

Zac Efron singles chronology
"You Are the Music in Me" (2007)	"Gotta Go My Own Way" (2007)	"Everyday" (2007)

Vanessa Hudgens singles chronology
"You Are the Music in Me" (2007)	"Gotta Go My Own Way" (2007)	"Everyday" (2007)

"Gotta Go My Own Way" is a song from the Disney Channel Original Movie High School Musical 2. It is featured on the soundtrack of the film and performed by Vanessa Hudgens and Zac Efron as Gabriella Montez and Troy Bolton.

== Composition ==
The song is a pop ballad, featuring gentle beats and acoustic guitars. It has been described as a bittersweet duet.

Marianne Eloise of Vice has commented the song "sounds exactly like" "Leave (Get Out)" by JoJo.

== Charts ==
Chart (2007–2008)	Peak position
Canada Hot 100 (Billboard)	67
Germany (GfK)	67
Ireland (IRMA)	36
Italy (FIMI)	39
Switzerland (Schweizer Hitparade)	59
UK Singles (OCC)	40
US Billboard Hot 100	34
US Pop 100 (Billboard)	31

== Certifications ==
Region	Certification	Certified units/sales
New Zealand (RMNZ)	Gold	15,000^{‡}
United Kingdom (BPI)	Silver	200,000^{‡}
United States (RIAA)	Platinum	1,000,000^{‡}
^{‡} Sales+streaming figures based on certification alone.
