= Nickelodeon UK Kids' Choice Awards =

British entertainment awards

- Country: United Kingdom
- Presented by: Nickelodeon
- Reward: KCA Blimp
- First award: 20 October 2007
- Final award: 24 March 2013
- Website: http://www.nick.co.uk/kca

Television/radio coverage
- Network: Nickelodeon

The Nickelodeon Kids' Choice Awards UK, also known as the KCAs, was an annual awards show, similar to the US and Australian versions. It originally started as a full ceremony hosted locally, but has recently been reduced to several UK-specific categories that are announced during the broadcast of the US Nickelodeon Kids' Choice Awards during time actually devoted to advertising.

== History ==
=== 2007 ===
Previous to 2007, the US ceremony aired with a tape delay on the network without local continuity. The first ever UK awards ceremony took place on 20 October 2007 from ExCel Exhibition Centre in London and was hosted by McFly. Mark Felgate, Sy Thomas, and Laura Hamilton hosted in-show backstage continuity and website-exclusive segments.

=== 2008 ===
The second UK awards ceremony took place on 20 September 2008 again from ExCel, hosting by The X Factor judge Dannii Minogue. Felgate, Thomas, and Hamilton again provided backstage and Internet continuity segments.

=== 2009 ===
In 2009 the third UK awards ceremony was supposed to take place on an unknown date and would have been presented by members of the band Hadouken!. The ceremony was eventually canceled due to budget concerns with no local awards for that year.

=== 2010–2013 ===
Since 2010, only the US ceremony has been presented on the network, usually with a one-day delay, with local-specific awards given during advertising breaks as continuity which is hosted by Nickelodeon UK presenters. In 2015 with the acquisition of terrestrial network Channel 5 by Viacom, an encore began to be carried within a week after the original Nickelodeon UK airing, free-to-air.
