= Book banning in the United States (2021–present) =

Wave of challenges against books

- Challenges or attempts to ban book titles increased in the 2020s.
- Location: Parts of the United States, including Florida, Iowa, Missouri, Montana, South Carolina and Texas
- Cause: National conservatism, perceived obscenity, right-wing populism, Culture war
- Participants: Republican lawmakers in red states
- Outcome: Banning of thousands of books from school libraries in many states

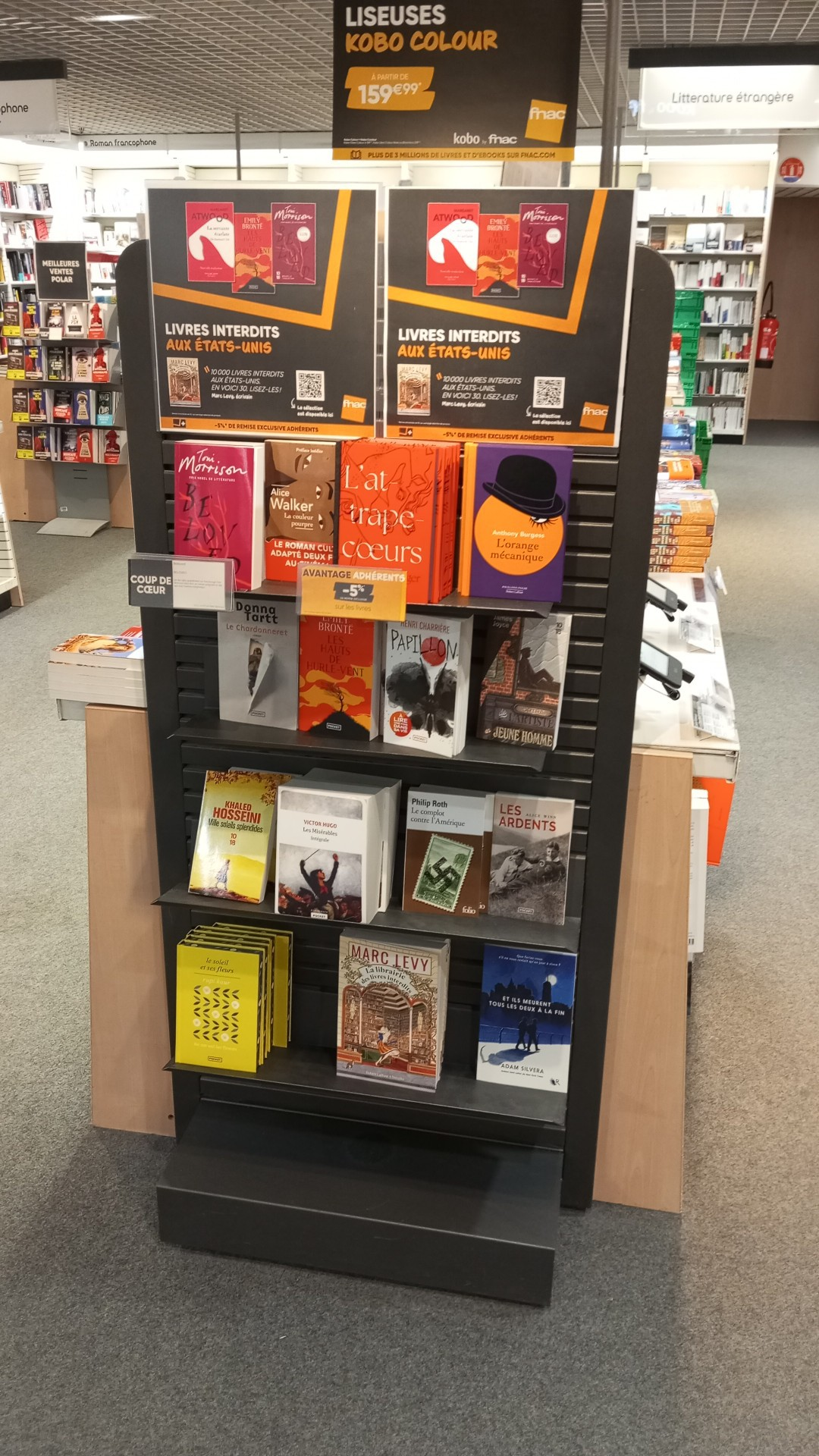
Selection by the Fnac shop in Dijon, (Côte-d'or, Burgundy, France), of French translation of books that were banned in the United States in May 2025. Up and down and from left to right: first row: Toni Morrison Beloved, Alice Walker The Color Purple, J.D. Salinger The Catcher in the Rye, Anthony Burgess A Clockwork Orange. Second row: Donna Tartt The Goldfinch, Emily Brontë Wuthering Heights, Henri Charrière Papillon (not a translation because the original novel was written in French), James Joyce A Portrait of the Artist as a Young Man. Third row: Khaled Hosseini A Thousand Splendid Suns, Victor Hugo The Miserables (not a translation because the original novel was written in French), Philip Roth The Plot Against America, Alice Winn In Memoriam. Forth row: Rupi Kaur The Sun and Her Flowers, Marc Levy The Bookshop of Forbidden Books (not a translation because the original novel was written in French), Adam Silvera They Both Die at the End. The poster above advertises Ebook versions for Beloved, Wuthering Heights, The Bookshop of Forbidden books and Margaret Atwood The Handmaid's Tale.

Starting in 2021, there have been thousands of books banned or challenged annually in parts of the United States, a sharp increase over previous years. Most of the targeted books have to do with race, gender, and sexuality. Unlike most book challenges in the past, whereby local parents or other stakeholders in the community engaged teachers and school administrators in a debate over a title, mass challenges begin with national advocacy organizations that then support and mobilize local parent groups. Challenges in this era have also been more likely to involve legal and legislative measures rather than just conversations in local communities. Journalists, academics, librarians, and others commonly link the coordinated, often well-funded book challenges to other efforts to restrict what students should learn about systemic bias and the history of the United States. Hundreds of books have been challenged, including high-profile examples like Maus by Art Spiegelman, New Kid by Jerry Craft, and The Handmaid’s Tale by Margaret Atwood.

The American Library Association (ALA) documented 1,269 demands of book censorship in 2022. It was the highest the organization had ever recorded since it began collecting censorship data more than 20 years prior. Challenges peaked in 2023, with 4,240 different book titles challenged nationwide, as part of 1,247 reported requests filed against books, and other library resources, such as educational research databases. This represented an 11% increase in titles targeted at school libraries, and a 92% increase in the number of titles targeted at public libraries, compared to 2022. ALA reported that challenges dipped in 2024 to 1,915 and came back up to 4,235 in 2025. These numbers do not account for underreporting, censorship by exclusion, chilling effects, and legislative restrictions.

A 2023 analysis by The Washington Post found that a majority of book challenges in over 100 school districts from the 2021–2022 school year were filed by just 11 people. The percentage of challenges coming from activist groups, politicians, and decision-makers increased to 72% in 2024 and 92% in 2025. Only 3% of challenges came from individual parents in 2025.

Legislation-based censorship led to 10,000 books to be banned from schools in the 2023-2024 academic year, according to a survey by PEN America, nearly tripling the number for the previous academic year. At the beginning of the second Trump administration, the Department of Education’s Office for Civil Rights dismissed 11 cases regarding challenged books in schools and eliminated an oversight position for investigating such issues, calling book censorship a "hoax".

The five most frequently banned books in U.S. Public School Districts were: A Clockwork Orange, Breathless, Sold, Last Night at the Telegraph Club, and A Court of Mist and Fury. The three states leading the nation in reporting bans are: Florida at 2,304, Texas at 1,781, and Tennessee at 1,622.

The earliest book bans in the U.S. began with laws intended to keep enslaved people illiterate. Now, in the 21st century bans are centered around books that uplift Black, LGBTQ+, and Indigenous peoples and authors.

== Scope ==
In fall 2021, the American Library Association (ALA) received 330 reports of book challenges, a rate which it called "unprecedented", but also an undercount because the ALA estimates 82–97% of challenges are not reported. The New York Times reported in January 2022 that "parents, activists, school board officials and lawmakers around the country are challenging books at a pace not seen in decades". In April 2022, nonprofit organization PEN America found that 1,586 book bans targeting 1,145 unique books had occurred in the past nine months. Also in April, the ALA published its annual report on book censorship, finding that there were 729 attempts to remove school, university and library materials in 2021, resulting in 1,597 book challenges or removals. This is the highest number of removals and challenges of books that the ALA has recorded in a single year since the organization began tracking book censorship more than 20 years ago. In the first eight months of 2022, the ALA received 681 reports of book challenges targeting 1,651 unique books. Most of the books have to do with race, sex, sexual orientation, and gender.

The ALA's Office for Intellectual Freedom released preliminary data for 2024, stating, "Between January 1 and August 31, 2024, ALA’s Office for Intellectual Freedom tracked 414 attempts to censor library materials and services. In those cases, 1,128 unique titles were challenged. In the same reporting period of 2023, ALA tracked 695 attempts with 1,915 unique titles challenged. Though the number of reports to date has declined in 2024, the number of documented attempts to censor books continues to far exceed the numbers prior to 2020." The ALA also stated that there was a decrease in documented censorship from 2023 that could be contributed to underreporting, censorship by exclusion, and Legislation restrictions.

== Role of activist organizations ==
Parents, teachers, students, and other stakeholders commonly express concerns over the works students read in schools. Typically, the process of challenging a book's inclusion in curricula or in libraries involves the parties reading the book, debating its appropriateness, and making a decision at the level of a teacher, class, school, or district. The spate of challenges and bans in 2021–22 differ from the norm in number as well as the tactics and politics involved. The involvement of national advocacy groups also sets the 2021–present trend apart from book challenges of the past. National conservative organizations, activists, and politicians have driven many of the challenges, and they have operated through higher-level political processes than usual, proposing legislation and petitioning lawmakers rather than just teachers or local school boards.

Organizations like No Left Turn in Education and Parents Defending Education operate nationally, with connections to wealthy conservative donors and organizations, but provide resources, connections, and sophisticated strategy to grow, support, and mobilize local parent groups. According to NBC News, as of June 2021, there were "at least 165 local and national groups that aim to disrupt lessons on race and gender". Several of the challenges have begun with lists of books shared online by conservative advocacy organizations like No Left Turn in Education and Moms for Liberty. The lists are distributed to parents who then audit local schools and libraries to see if they have any copies of the listed titles. No Left Turn in Education, for example, maintains lists of books in categories "critical race theory", "anti-police", and "comprehensive sexuality education", which they say "are used to spread radical and racist ideologies to students". The strategy of distributing lists has meant that many challenges come from people who have not actually read the books they argue to ban.

NBC News reported that while these groups operate differently, "they share strategies of disruption, publicity and mobilization. The groups swarm school board meetings, inundate districts with time-consuming public records requests and file lawsuits and federal complaints alleging discrimination against white students." One parent in Rhode Island submitted more than 200 records requests which took 300 staff hours to respond to. In some places, they teamed up with other activists fighting against public health restrictions in schools during the COVID-19 pandemic. The groups have also been successful in attracting attention in conservative media. According to University of Massachusetts political science professor Maurice T. Cunningham, the parents' rights groups are "highly networked into The Daily Caller, Breitbart [and] Fox News".

In 2021, only 1% of the challenges were initiated by students, and most were by parents or library patrons. A 2023 analysis by The Washington Post found that a majority of book challenges in over 100 school districts from the 2021–2022 school year were filed by just 11 people. The percentage of challenges coming from activist groups, politicians, and decision-makers increased to 72% in 2024 and 92% in 2025. Only 3% of challenges came from individual parents in 2025.

== Subject focus ==
Most of the targeted books have to do with race, gender, and sexuality. Journalists, academics, librarians, and others commonly link the coordinated, often well-funded book challenges to other efforts to restrict what students should learn about systemic bias and the history of the United States.

In 2020, the murder of George Floyd and other unarmed Black Americans by law enforcement led to widespread protests against police brutality and systemic racism. The public conversation about these concepts led some teachers and schools to talk about racism more with their students. That, and the Black Lives Matter movement in general, also fueled a conservative backlash advocating for teaching students an idealized version of the history of the United States which omits or whitewashes issues like racism. The book challenge trend is frequently linked by journalists and academics to other elements of that reactionary movement, especially the restrictions on teaching "critical race theory" which limit the extent to which students can learn about systemic racism and the history of race in the United States. Legislation was introduced or passed in at least 29 states taking aim at lessons that teach children about race and inequality, with most of the laws framed around putting a stop to "critical race theory". These laws, which use broad language prohibiting teaching about privilege related to race or sex, or systemic bias in the United States, have led to many book removals. NBC News described the use of the term "critical race theory" in this context as "a catch-all term to refer to what schools often call equity programs, teaching about racism or LGBTQ-inclusive policies". University of Michigan education professor Ebony Elizabeth Thomas summarized the issue as "an assumption that everything Black is critical race theory".

Proponents of removing books mention how certain kinds of lessons dealing with racism and history can make students uncomfortable and make white students feel guilty. In some other cases, the books have been by or about people of color or the LGBTQ community, but the reasons cited for removal have to do with profanity or sex. For example, The Hate U Give by Angie Thomas is about a black girl from a poor neighborhood who attends an elite, predominantly white private school and becomes entangled in a national news story after she witnesses a white police officer kill her childhood friend. It has been among the most challenged books primarily because it contains profanity.

According to Richard Price, a professor at Weber State University who studies book censorship, there is a "cycle of anxiety in which book challengers are driven by concerns and fears about a changing world. And so whatever the issue of the day is, then that usually drives and pushes people to try to remove books". Before the focus on critical race theory in 2020, the most commonly banned books had to do with LGBTQ inclusion. In her Washington Post analysis, Valerie Strauss contextualized the bans in the history of book censorship in the United States, dating back to charges of blasphemy in 1650 against William Pynchon's The Meritorious Price on Our Redemption, and spanning The Adventures of Huckleberry Finn, and the Harry Potter books, which were the most challenged books between 2000 and 2009. Strauss and education historian Adam Laats connected the trend to challenges of Darwin's On the Origin of Species and evolution in schools in the early 20th century which, according to Laats, involved similar strategies of mobilizing parents to take over school boards and widescale legislative proposals claiming to defend children's morality.

In at least one instance, book review magazines have been targeted; in July 2026, print copies of the book review magazine BookPage were pulled from public libraries in Hernando County in Florida.

== Reactions ==
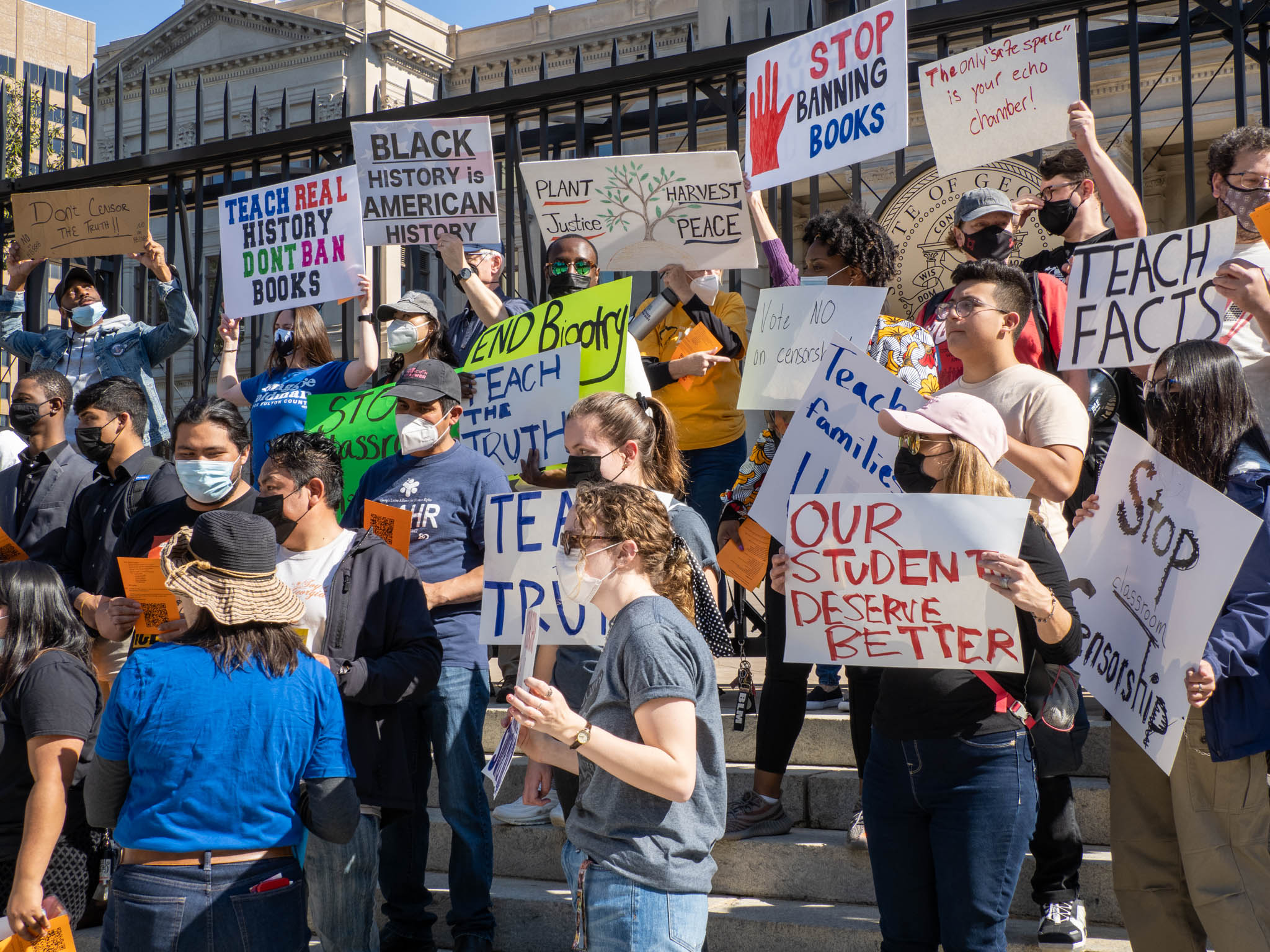
Protest against book banning at the Georgia State Capitol, 2022

Free speech advocates, academics, journalists, and other critics have characterized the campaigns as part of a larger effort to use politics and legislation at the local and state level to impose on education an ideologically skewed version of the United States, its history, and its culture. The Takeaway's Melissa Harris-Perry cited discomfort with issues like gender identity as one of the common reasons for challenges, but that "this discomfort is likely imposed by adults onto young learners" who are otherwise more accepting and more likely to think outside traditional gender roles.

Shauntee Burns-Simpson of the New York Public Library highlighted the issue of taking one page or one quote from a book without context and making a decision about the value of a book based on an initial reaction to that quote. Burns-Simpson also noted that banning the book does not just take away the words in the book, but the possibility for conversation about the concepts it raises.

The American Library Association released a statement signed by its executive board and Boards of Directors of its eight divisions in response to "a dramatic uptick in book challenges and outright removal of books from libraries". Their message condemned "a few organizations [which] have advanced the proposition that the voices of the marginalized have no place on library shelves ... falsely claiming that these works are subversive, immoral, or worse [and inducing] officials to abandon constitutional principles, ignore the rule of law, and disregard individual rights to promote government censorship of library collections". A spokesperson told ABC News that in her time working with reports of book challenges, she had "never seen such a widespread effort to remove books on racial and gender diversity".

A spokesperson for the National Coalition Against Censorship said the events were "damaging to all stakeholders", including teachers who must comply, learners who do not read stories that reflect the world around them, and students from the marginalized groups depicted in the stories, who learn "that their own stories and their own lives aren't fit for consumption". As a response to the increasing number of book bans and challenges targeting LGBT materials, the Queer Liberation Library formed in 2023 to provide digital access for anyone residing in the United States.

At a White House event honoring educators on April 24, 2023, President Joe Biden commented, "I never thought I’d be a president who is fighting against elected officials trying to ban and banning books. Empty shelves don’t help kids learn very much. And I’ve never met a parent who wants a politician dictating what their kid can learn, and what they can think, or who they can be." In June 2023, the Biden administration announced Biden appointed a coordinator at the U.S. Department of Education to address the rise in book bans. The coordinator will train and advise school districts on how book restrictions may violate federal civil rights laws by creating hostile environments for students.

Illinois enacted the nation's first state law to restrict the ability of local libraries to enact book bans. The law withholds state funding from any library that bans books for "partisan or doctrinal" reasons. It makes mandatory the Library Bill of Rights published by the American Library Association. Governor J. B. Pritzker signed the law on June 12, 2023, and it took effect at the start of the following year.A 2025 report by PEN America examined parental preferences regarding school library access in Florida. Of the 41 school districts that responded to a public records request, 35 used policies that allowed students full library access unless parents requested restrictions. In 34 of those districts, at least 95% of students maintained full access to their school libraries.

A number of authors whose works were banned spoke out. Some saw it as a badge of honor, while others found it distressing. Kalynn Bayron, author of Cinderella Is Dead, said "these things speak to the level of bigotry that still exists, specifically within our public education system". Kwame Alexander said some of the interest in banning books might have been avoided if advocates had more opportunities themselves as children to experience diverse perspectives. Mikki Kendall, whose book Hood Feminism was among the most challenged, said the bans are a "ridiculous publicity stunt" which would not actually stop kids from reading the books because "there's nothing more attractive to a kid than a forbidden book". Jason Reynolds, co-author of All American Boys, said the bans were more about parents "doing everything they can to shield young people from the things that scare them, not things that scare the children".

In many cases, bans on certain books led to increased sales of those books, such as works by Jerry Craft, Toni Morrison, and Adam Rapp. The popularizing effects of banning any book, and the increased ease of access in the age of the Internet, mean the consequences of a ban are less significant than they were when books were harder to access, making it more of a ceremonial act. Some critics have argued this also makes some of the actions more about punishing educators and librarians or creating a chilling effect than limiting what students have access to. For example, proposed legislation in Iowa would allow for criminal prosecution of librarians. University of Chicago history professor Ada Palmer said that the main goal of censorship throughout history has not been "to silence or destroy books or works that already exist [but] to frighten people and discourage them from reading, buying and creating similar works in the future".

TikTok has been one of the most prominent social media platforms for protesting book bans, driven by its active BookTok community. Videos on BookTok share banned book lists, encourage participation in #BannedBooksWeek, and share stories from librarians, students, and authors. These viral videos primarily affect readers’ emotions, making reading feel like activism rather than directly influencing legislation. In Belton, Texas, one middle school librarian went viral on TikTok after posting a video about being told to take down her banned book display after receiving complaints from parents. The video sparked protests at the school board and corresponding backlash from students defending the librarian. "It's not about taking away a [parent’s] autonomy," said the librarian in her first video. "Your kid definitely does not have to read those books. However, this is an opportunity to bring awareness, information and knowledge to kids when they might not otherwise have it." Although social media users post on both sides of the argument, platforms are generally more effective for those against censorship because they allow students to easily share their personal experiences with banned books in schools.

External videos
- Q&A interview with Adam Szetela on his book That Book Is Dangerous! How Moral Panic, Social Media, and the Culture Wars Are Remaking Publishing, May 17, 2026, C-SPAN

Several commentators argued it is hypocritical for conservative pundits and politicians to support banning books that may make students feel uncomfortable after a period of strongly criticizing "cancel culture". Adam Szetela of Newsweek opined that both the right and the left are "guilty" of banning books, citing the ban of To Kill a Mockingbird in California schools, Dr. Seuss' books being pulled from libraries and bookstores, and videos of liberals burning Harry Potter books. Angela Haupt of The Washington Post also noted efforts by Democratic politicians and liberal parents to ban books for containing racist language, racial slurs and "white savior" characters, including Adventures of Huckleberry Finn, To Kill a Mockingbird and Of Mice and Men. Katherine Mangu-Ward of Reason noted that the ALA's list of challenged and banned books "suggests book banners lean right—with an increasing emphasis on books with queer themes or characters, for example—though book challenges come from across the spectrum of political opinion and aesthetic preference.", but added that "It's debatable whether the list's bias is an artifact of the collectors' concerns or simply a reflection of an underlying reality." Kyle Smith of National Review accused the media of a double standard when labeling the removal of Maus from the McMinn County, Tennessee school curriculum by the school board as a "ban", while not using the same label for when To Kill a Mockingbird was removed from required curriculum by a school board in Washington State.

=== Organizations and programs opposing book censorship ===
- Books Unbanned, a United States library program that gives electronic access to the library in locations where books are being challenged
- The Banned Book Club, an online resource that allows readers to check out books banned by local libraries
- Queer Liberation Library, an LGBT digital library that aims to provide resources representing LGBT communities that is accessible to those living in areas where physical access to LGBT books is limited
- Banned Books Week, an annual awareness campaign that draws attention to banned and challenged books
- Freedom to Read Foundation, a non-profit anti-censorship organization that has been active in First Amendment-based challenges to book removals from libraries
- Moon Palace Books, a Minneapolis local bookstore partnering with Iowa anti-censorship organization Annie's Foundation to send banned books to Iowa.
- Brooklyn Public Library offers a free library card to check out ebooks as part of their Books Unbanned initiative.
- Quatrefoil Library, an independent nonprofit LGBTQ library in Minneapolis, offers free library cards to anyone in the world.
- Unite Against Book Bans is a coalition initiated by the American Library Association. In 2024 it organized a book tour with banned author Jodi Picoult to oppose censorship.
- New York Public Library organizes a Teen Banned Book Club.
- PEN America, a non-profit organization mixes literature and human rights to protect free expression in the United States.
- First Amendment Center, a non-profit organization that wants to protect to first amendment through information and education. Is an operating program of the Freedom Forum.
- National Coalition Against Censorship, works to protect free expression and access to information by providing educational resources documenting and reporting on current censorship issues, and working to influence judicial opinions about free expression and access to information by submitting amici briefs.
- Office for Intellectual Freedom, established in 1967 through the American Library Association, charge with implementing ALA policies concerning the concept of intellectual freedom as embodied in the Library Bill of Rights.
- International Literacy Association (ILA), membership organization, advocators for children's rights to read and to excellent literacy instruction.

== Lawsuits and legislation ==
In late 2022 and early 2023, efforts escalated into proposals by public officials in several states to close libraries or defund library systems that were seen as facilitating the availability of objected books.

Based on a survey by PEN, about 10,000 books were banned from various US schools by censorship laws in the 2023/2024 academic year. This was nearly triple the amount of the previous academic year.

On January 24, 2025, the Trump Department of Education made a press release stating that they had ended "Biden's Book Ban Hoax" and that the Department of Education’s Office for Civil Rights had dismissed 11 cases regarding challenged books in schools. They also eliminated the position of the book ban coordinator responsible for investigating school districts accused of censorship.

=== Central York School District, Pennsylvania ===
In August 2020, a diversity committee in the school district for central York County, Pennsylvania, created a reading list for students and community members amid the George Floyd protests. Though it was intended as a guide for students to learn about issues of race, diversity, and culture, the school board used it as a list of books to remove, voting to "freeze" them a few months later. Though the board decision did not attract much attention, an email from the school principal to staff in August 2021 received significant pushback. In the email, the principal told teachers they were prohibited from using any of the materials on the list in their classes. The hundreds of works on the list were largely about representation of Black and Latino Americans in the United States. As described by The New York Times, some parents objected to material that would "make white children feel guilty about their race or 'indoctrinate' students". Students protested, wearing black t-shirts, advocating on social media, and picketing daily before school started. Officials argued that the books were "frozen" rather than "banned" until they could be evaluated, although the books remained off of the shelves for nearly a year. A spokesperson for the Pennsylvania State Education Association told the York Daily Record that "if you look at this material, it's offensive what they banned. They have banned materials from Black voices, and they've had almost a year now and they haven't proposed anything else". The school board met again to discuss the ban in September 2021, and decided to reaffirm it. Amid criticism, it reconvened shortly thereafter and reversed its decision, saying it never intended to ban the material, but rather wanted time to review it.

=== Texas House Bill 3979 ===
The Texas Legislature passed House Bill 3979 in July 2021. Known as Texas's "critical race theory law", after an academic field which became a common objection for conservatives, it restricts the manner and extent to which students may learn about or discuss race, racism, sex, or sexism, or the role of those concepts in American culture and history. The law, and confusion over how to enforce it, led to many book challenges.

In October 2021, Texas Representative Matt Krause distributed a list to Texas school superintendents containing 850 books having to do with race, sexuality, and history which might "make students feel discomfort". Most of the books' authors are women, people of color, or LGBTQ. Krause wanted to know which school districts had the books and how much was spent on them. The list included a wide range of fiction and non-fiction bestsellers and award-winners like The Confessions of Nat Turner by William Styron, Between the World and Me by Ta-Nehisi Coates, and Hood Feminism: Notes from the Women that a Movement Forgot by Mikki Kendall. Authors on the list reacted with a mix of outrage and pride. The president of the Texas State Teachers Association called it a "witch hunt" and a "disturbing and political overreach into the classroom" which raises legal concerns. While Krause did not make his motivations or intentions clear, the Texas Tribune speculated it may have to do with House Bill 3979.

The Katy Independent School District removed New Kid by Jerry Craft in October 2021 and canceled an event with the author. The graphic novel, which won the 2020 Kirkus Prize, Newbury Medal, and Coretta Scot King Award, is about a 12-year-old black boy who experiences culture shock when he enrolls at a private school. The district reacted to a petition which said the book promoted critical race theory, Marxism, and "reverse racism". The person who began the petition, who also sued the school district over a mask mandate, said she heard Craft talking about "microaggressions" in interviews, which she said indicated an ideology related to critical race theory. According to Craft, he was not even aware of critical race theory when he wrote the book. After receiving national attention, a review committee decided to reinstate the book and reschedule Craft's event.

In November 2021, Governor Greg Abbott publicized his investigation into pornography and obscenity accessible to kids in school libraries.

Following the investigations by Krause and Abbott, a San Antonio district removed more than 400 books in December 2021.

=== Maus and McMinn County Schools, Tennessee ===
Maus is a nonfiction book by Art Spiegelman in which he interviews his father about his experiences as a Polish Jew and Holocaust survivor. The work is presented as a graphic novel, and it depicts groups of people as different kinds of animals. It was the first graphic novel to win a Pulitzer Prize.

On January 10, 2022, the board of trustees of McMinn County Schools in Tennessee removed Maus from its schools' curriculum, expressing concern over its use in 8th grade English Language Arts classes. The decision overruled a state curriculum review that had approved the book. The board cited "tough language" and "unnecessary" profanity (eight words, including "damn"), a small drawing of a (nude) cat representing a woman, and mentions of murder, violence, and suicide. The board questioned its age-appropriateness and whether it aligned with the values of the community.

The removal attracted criticism and international media attention the day before Holocaust Remembrance Day. Spiegelman called the decision "Orwellian" and said reading the minutes of the board meeting indicated the board was effectively asking "Why can't they teach a nicer Holocaust?". Several elected officials, writers, journalists, librarians, and academics spoke out against it. James Blasingame of Arizona State University argued that what makes Maus disturbing is what should make any book about the Holocaust disturbing.

Following publicity around the ban, sales of Maus spiked, becoming the number one best-seller on Amazon. A bookstore in Tennessee offered to give a free copy of The Complete Maus to any student who requested one, leading them to create a GoFundMe campaign to cover the demand.

=== Florida Parental Rights in Education Act ===
Former Florida Representative Joe Harding filed House Bill 1557, Parental Rights in Education, commonly referred to as the "Don't Say Gay" Bill, on January 11, 2022. Florida Governor Ron DeSantis signed the bill on March 28, 2022, and the act went into effect on July 1, 2022.

Among other provisions, the law bans classroom discussion or instruction on gender identity and sexual orientation from kindergarten to third grade. From fourth to twelfth grade, the law restricts such discussion to what the state deems to be either "age appropriate or developmentally appropriate". However, in April 2023, the Florida Board of Education voted to expand the ban on classroom instruction on gender identity and sexual orientation to grades four through twelve, with exceptions for sex education lessons for which parents can opt-out and other explicit state requirements. In May 2023, Florida passed HB 1069, which expanded the complete ban in statute to pre-kindergarten through eighth grade.

These laws have led to school districts across the state removing books with LGBTQ content. In an attempt to follow the statute, Lake County School District restricted access to 40 books, most dealing with LGBTQ themes. Books restricted included A Day in the Life of Marlon Bundo by Jill Twiss, And Tango Makes Three by Peter Parnell and Justin Richardson, and In Our Mothers’ House by Patricia Polacco. Also citing the law, Seminole County removed three books with LGBTQ+ or gender-non-conforming characters – I Am Jazz by Jessica Herthel and Jazz Jennings, Jacob’s New Dress by Ian Hoffman and Sarah Hoffman, and 10,000 Dresses by Marcus Ewert.

In June 2023, Parnell and Richardson sued Lake County School District for banning And Tango Makes Three with "no legitimate pedagogical reason". Richardson commented that, although the book had been the target of restrictions since being released in 2005, it had never been permanently restricted in a public school library until December 2022, in Lake County.

Federal district judge Carlos Mendoza of the United States District Court for the Middle District of Florida ruled in August 2025 that the bulk of the book ban from HR1069 was unconstitutional, with the basis for banning books based on whether they "describe sexual content" was overbroad. Mendoza left portions of the law allowing bans based on the established Miller test.

=== Madison County Public Library System, Mississippi ===
A mayor in Ridgeland, Mississippi denied $110,000 in funding to the Madison County Public Library System that had already been approved by the city's board of aldermen. His justification for doing so was the library's possession of books on LGBTQ+ topics. According to Tonja Jackson, the executive director of the library, the mayor declared that he would not release the funds until all of those books were removed, citing his personal religious beliefs. Jackson stated, "I explained that we are a public library and we serve the entire community. I told him our collection reflects the diversity of our community. He told me that the library can serve whoever we wanted, but that he only serves the great Lord above." McGhee has maintained that his opposition to the LGBTQ+ books stems from complaints from community members.

The library began a fundraiser due to the funding being withheld, and raised $77,000 in an eight-day period. The board of aldermen met as a result of the funding being withheld; more than twenty members of the public spoke, and the meeting lasted for two hours. One member of the public described the books as "filth" and "pornographic."

=== Hamilton County School Board, Tennessee ===
The school board of Hamilton County, Tennessee created a book-review committee with the intent to draft a policy regarding book selections in public school libraries and complaints of books already on shelves. This committee contained two representatives from each of the nine current Hamilton County school districts in which each member was invited to share their thoughts and views on the policy and how it should be changed.

The committee was formed after School Board Chairman Tucker McClendon introduced the idea, and it was agreed to be led by District 1 representative Rhonda Thurman. Thurman explained that her reasoning behind chairing the committee is because, "I’m just wanting to inform the public about what their tax dollars are paying for, what's in the libraries, the process". In a personal opinion piece, Thurman cited four books she viewed to be unfit for school libraries: More Than We Can Tell by Brigid Kemmerer, On the Come Up by Angie Thomas, Far from the Tree by Robin Benway, and The Hate U Give by Angie Thomas.

After several weeks of debate, the new policies, 4.402 and 4.403, were then presented to the Hamilton County School Board at its March 17, 2022 meeting. The policy requires reported books to be evaluated on a balancing test of its offensiveness to its literary value. Those books whose offensive material outweighs its literary value will be removed from school library shelves.

With this topic being debated in Hamilton County since 2021, many community members representing both sides of this debate have spoken out about the proposed policy changes. Many organizations, like the Tennessee Association of School Librarians, Tennessee Library Association, and Friends of the Tennessee Libraries have spoken out against the school board and Thurman, citing that, "students' 'freedom to read and unfettered access to information is protected by their First Amendment rights". At the March 17, 2022, school board meeting, when the policy was presented, approximately ten community members addressed the school board during public comment both in support of and against the newly proposed policy.

Policies 4.402 and 4.403 are currently being revised and updated by school board attorney Scott Bennett. Once finalized, the policies will then be submitted and must go through debate amongst the school board and two separate votes for the policy to be enacted.

=== Gender Queer and A Court of Mist and Fury in Virginia ===
In May 2022, Tim Anderson, who was a Republican delegate in the Virginia House of Delegates, filed two motions for temporary restraining orders against the books Gender Queer and A Court of Mist and Fury, with the goal being the restriction of the distribution of the books to minors by booksellers and libraries. Anderson had done so on behalf of Tommy Altman, another politician who was running as a Republican for Congress. A group of independent bookstores and organizations represented by the American Civil Liberties Union of Virginia filed a brief arguing the motions were unconstitutional. Barnes & Nobles also filed a brief for a motion to dismiss the case. The judge dismissed the case a few months later in August.

=== Iowa: GLBT Youth in Iowa Schools Task Force v. Reynolds and Penguin Random House v. Robbins (2023) ===
In Iowa, Senate File 496 (SF 496), prohibiting schools from providing books that include or describe sex acts, was introduced and passed by the Iowa Legislature in early 2023. Variously known as a "Don't Say Gay" law, a "Book Ban" law, and a "Parental Rights" law, the measure was signed into law by Iowa governor Kim Reynolds on May 26 and some of its provisions went into effect on July 1.

A coalition of LGBT advocacy groups and families sued in the United States District Court for the Southern District of Iowa in November 2023. Publisher Penguin Random House, four bestselling authors and educators filed a separate lawsuit that month.

Judge Stephen H. Locher issued an injunction against some parts of the law on December 29, 2023, calling the law "wildly overbroad".

=== Louisiana Act 436 ===
In Louisiana, Act 436 (formerly SB7) of the 2023 Regular Session was signed into law by Democratic Governor John Bel Edwards in June 2023 and went into effect August 1, 2023. The law requires all public libraries in the state of Louisiana to "adopt a policy to limit the access of minors to sexual explicit material." Libraries throughout the state were given a deadline of June 1, 2024, to implement new policies, with failure to do so resulting in the state withholding payments for library maintenance and upkeep and the State Bond Commission being forbidden to approve financial packages for library construction projects.

The Act specifically requires that a new library card system be created that require parents or guardians to select whether minors are allowed to check out materials deemed sexually explicit by the library board of control. Act 436 defines sexually explicit material as "textual, visual, or audio material, produced in any medium, that depicts or describes sexual conduct. The local library board of control makes the final decision on what falls under that category.

This has been met with controversy, with critics, such as the Louisiana Citizens Against Censorship, arguing that this bill paves the way for more widespread book bans, including those targeting LGBTQIA+ themes. Individual librarians who have resisted book bans have been targeted with threats and harassment, also worrying that non-compliance with the law could severely impact library operations.

=== Idaho House Bill 710 ===
Idaho HB710, signed into law in April 2024, requires school and public libraries to move materials deemed harmful to minors to an adults-only section, allowing community members who object to a book to sue for $250 in damages. The law uses Idaho's existing definition of obscene materials, which includes “any act of … homosexuality.” The Idaho Library Association warned the law's definitions of material harmful to minors was vague and subjective. In February 2025, Penguin Random House filed a lawsuit along with several other publishers, a library district, the Authors Guild, a teacher, students, and parents, saying the law is overly vague and violates the First Amendment. The suit argues libraries are forced to preemptively remove books due to inability to afford defense costs in the case of a lawsuit. In May 2024, a library too small to create an adults-only section barred minors from entering unless a parent or guardian had completed a complex, three-part waiver.

=== Arkansas Act 372 ===
Arkansas State Bill SB81 was notarized as Arkansas Act 372 on April 4, 2023. The law prohibits libraries from loaning out materials deemed to be obscene or explicit to individuals under 18. It also created a new offense for anyone who "furnishes, presents, provides, [or] makes available" such material to minors punishable as a Class A misdemeanor.

Despite calls from free speech advocacy groups and the Arkansas Library Association, the 8th U.S. Circuit of Appeals in St. Louis deemed the law to be constitutional and upheld the state of Arkansas' right to enforce it.

=== Alabama ===
On October 30, 2026, three authors - Kit Rosewater, Page Powars, and Phoenix McDonald - with representation by Democracy Forward filed a complaint against Alabama Public Library Service (APLS) and John Wahl in regards to the library services board's November 2025 revision of administrative code 520-2-2-.03, which mandated that books featuring "any materials regarding transgender procedures, gender ideology, or the concept of more than two biological genders" be exclusively shelved in adults-only sections at the risk of losing funding. According to the plaintiffs, Gadsden Public Library had denied requests to stock books by the authors, specifically Buried Feelings by Rosewater, But I Hate Him by Powars, and The Hidden Continent by McDonald, on the basis they contained transgender character, constituting both anti-LGBTQ discrimination and financial harm against the authors. The APLS had also previously frozen funding for Fairhope Public Library over its refusal to move select books including Beyond Magenta, The Handmaid's Tale, Lighter Than My Shadow, Sold, Shine, and The Perks of Being a Wallflower from the teens section in March 2025 on the basis that they contained "sexually explicit" material, later totally defunding the library in January 2026.

== Films ==
- The ABCs of Book Banning, 2023 documentary short
- Banned Together, 2024 documentary film
- The Librarians, 2025 documentary film

== See also ==
- Banned Books Week
- Book censorship in the United States
- Anti-literacy laws in the United States
- Censorship of school curricula in the United States
- Democratic backsliding in the United States
- 2020s anti-LGBT movement in the United States
- Katie Rinderle
- Section 28
- List of most commonly challenged books in the United States
