= Arkansas Act 372 =

Law about books in Arkansas public libraries

Arkansas Act 372 is a law allowing books in public libraries in Arkansas to be banned or transferred. It was signed by the Arkansas governor on March 31, 2023. Sections one and five of Arkansas Act 372 expose librarians and booksellers to criminal penalties, which includes up to a year in prison, in the case they distribute materials such as books, magazines, and movies deemed "harmful to minors."

On December 23, 2024, Judge Timothy L. Brooks permanently enjoined Sections 1 and 5 of Act 372, declaring those sections unconstitutional; on July 30, 2026, Eighth Circuit Judge L. Steven Grasz overturned Brooks' injunction.

== The Act ==
The primary purpose of Act 372 is to permit books in public libraries to be banned or transferred. It states that anybody may "challenge the appropriateness" of a book, although it does not specify what "obscene" or "appropriateness" means. According to the law, a panel of persons appointed by head librarians would assess disputed material and cast votes in a public hearing on whether it should be maintained on access to the public or transferred to a section of the library unavailable to individuals below the age of 18. Act 372 also permits librarians and booksellers to face up to a year in prison if they allow children to have access to banned books.

== Reactions ==
On 2 June 2023, a coalition of Arkansas librarians, booksellers, and customers launched a lawsuit challenging the lawsuit. The complaint was brought by Democracy Forward, a nonprofit legal advocacy organization, in the United States District Court for the Western District of Arkansas on behalf of the defendants, which also comprises the Arkansas Library Association and the Central Arkansas Library System. The lawsuit has challenged the legality of two out of six chapters included in Act 372. The group of plaintiffs includes the public libraries in Eureka Springs and Fayetteville, Central Arkansas Library System, trade associations and two bookstores. In July 2023, U.S. District Judge Timothy Brooks granted plaintiffs’ request to temporary enjoin two of the five sections of Act 372, saying that parts of the law violate freedoms under the First Amendment. Brooks’ decision meant much of Act 372 did not go into effect as originally scheduled.

Supporters of the new rule argue the legislation would safeguard children from "indoctrination" and concerns regarding the teaching of race and racism in US history, sexual preference, and gender identity as well.

In May of 2024, plaintiffs of the case petitioned that the law be permanently blocked. On December 23, 2024 Judge Brooks permanently enjoined Sections 1 and 5 of Act 372, declaring those sections unconstitutional. On July 30, 2026, Eighth Circuit Appeals Judge L. Steven Grasz, a Trump appointed judge, submitted a 24-page decision overturning Brooks' original injunction. Arkansas Attorney General, Tim Griffin, praised Grasz' ruling

== See also ==
- Book banning in the United States (2021–present)
