= Libraries and the LGBTQ community =

Library services to the LGBT community

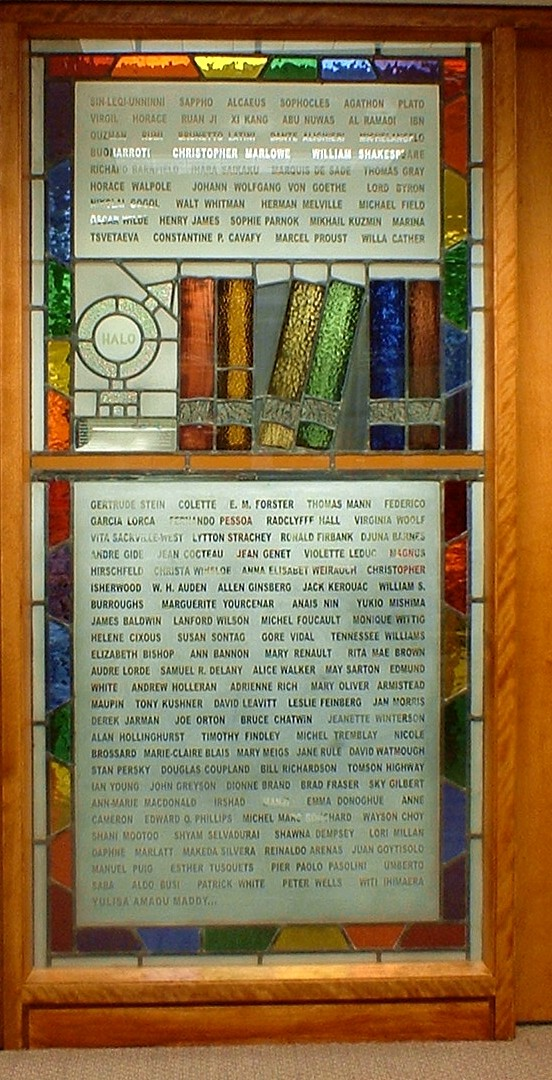
Stained glass window from the Pride Library at the University of Western Ontario

In the post-Stonewall era, the role of libraries in providing information and services to LGBTQ individuals has been a topic of discussion among library professionals. Libraries can often play an important role for LGBTQ individuals looking to find information about coming out, health, and family topics, as well as leisure reading. In the past 50 years, advocate organizations for LGBTQ content in libraries have emerged, and numerous theorists have discussed various aspects of LGBTQ library service including privacy concerns, programming, collection development considerations and librarian/staff education needs, as well as special services for juvenile and teen patrons.

== History ==
Commensurate with the LGBT rights movement in other arenas, LGBTQ activists began visibly advocating for greater representation in libraries in 1969. In 1970, the Task Force on Gay Liberation formed within the American Library Association (ALA). Now known as the Rainbow Round Table, this organization is the oldest LGBTQ professional organization in the United States. Barbara Gittings became its coordinator in 1971. She pushed the American Library Association for more visibility for gays and lesbians in the profession. She staffed a kissing booth at the Dallas convention of the ALA, underneath the banner "Hug a Homosexual", with a "women only" side and a "men only" side. When no one took advantage of it, she and Patience and Sarah author Alma Routsong (pen name: Isabel Miller) kissed in front of rolling television cameras. In describing its success, despite most of the reaction being negative, Gittings said, "We needed to get an audience. So we decided, let's show gay love live. We were offering free—mind you, free—same-sex kisses and hugs. Let me tell you, the aisles were mobbed, but no one came into the booth to get a free hug. So we hugged and kissed each other. It was shown twice on the evening news, once again in the morning. It put us on the map."

In the early 1970s, the Task Force on Gay Liberation campaigned to have books about the gay liberation movement at the Library of Congress reclassified from HQ 71–471 ("Abnormal Sexual Relations, Including Sexual Crimes"). In 1972, after receiving a letter requesting the reclassification, the Library of Congress agreed to make the shift, reclassifying those books into a newly created category, HQ 76.5 ("Homosexuality, Lesbianism—Gay Liberation Movement, Homophile Movement").

Gay rights pioneer Barbara Gittings (July 31, 1932 – February 18, 2007) advocated for a revolution in the inclusion and cataloging of LGBTQ materials in public libraries to create a more positive, supportive, informative environment for all members of the community.

In the 1980s, literature began to emerge which examined information seeking behaviors of gay and lesbian library patrons. The 1981 book The Joy of Cataloging by Sanford Berman outlined the difficulties of accessing gay and lesbian books and information. In 1988, the Task Force on Gay Liberation released the "International thesaurus of gay and lesbian index terms," aimed at standardizing terms used for cataloging gay and lesbian-related library materials, and changing or removal of pejorative Library of Congress Subject Headings in relation to same-sex attraction and the LGBTQ community.

Four years later, in 1992, Ellen Greenblatt and Cal Gough published the first collection of essays about the information needs of gay and lesbian patrons, entitled Gay and Lesbian Library Service. The work has since been revised as Serving LGBTIQ Library and Archives Users and remains influential.

In 1992, American Libraries published a photo of the Gay and Lesbian Task Force (now the Rainbow Round Table) on the cover of its July/August issue, drawing both criticism and praise from the library world. Some commenters called the cover "in poor taste" and accused American Libraries of "glorifying homosexuality," while others were supportive of the move. Christine Williams, who wrote about the controversy in her 1998 essay A Lesbigay Gender Perplex: Sexual Stereotyping and Professional Ambiguity in Librarianship, concluded that in the mid-90s, the library world was "not an especially welcoming place to gays and lesbians."

In 2007, the Rainbow Project Task Force began within the ALA to promote the presence of LGBTQ juvenile and young adult literature in library collections. The group now, now called the Rainbow Book List Committee maintains an annotated bibliography of LGBTQ titles for youth and teens, as well the yearly Rainbow List featuring the best of LGBTQ YA and children's titles.

In 2010, the GLBT Round Table announced a new committee, the Over the Rainbow Committee. This committee annually compiles a bibliography of books that show the GLBT community in a favorable light and reflects the interests of adults. The bibliographies provide guidance to libraries in the selection of positive GLBT materials.

After the passage of equal marriage in the State of New York in 2011, the Research Library at the Buffalo History Museum in Buffalo, New York, became the first known library in the United States to collect wedding memorabilia from legally-wed same-sex couples.

== Challenges ==
=== Legal restrictions ===
Historically libraries have had instances of being legally restricted from providing LGBTQ materials, in the United Kingdom Section 28 prohibited public libraries run by local authorities to 'promote homosexuality' leading to libraries scaling back what they delivered whilst the law was in place 1988–2003.

The passage of House Bills 1557 and 1467 in Florida state legislature in 2022 raised concerns over a possible increase in limitations on LGBT materials in school libraries. Although neither bill explicitly targets such materials, faculty from schools across the state have reported being directed to remove previously accepted LGBTQ books from their classrooms and school libraries that could now be deemed harmful or offensive to minors under the bills. A proposal to expand HB 1557 to cover all school grades (the original bill prohibits certain materials from being presented to children in Kindergarten through third grade) is now under consideration.

=== Privacy ===
In their 2006 study of LGBTQ book circulation in an academic library, Stephanie Mathson and Jeffery Hancks found that LGBTQ titles were 20% more likely to circulate via a self-checkout machine than a traditional circulation desk staffed by a person. However, their sample size was small, so study results may be inconclusive.

=== Need for library staff education ===
Providing unbiased service to all patrons is one of the central tenets of the Code of Ethics of the American Library Association. Articles dating back to Richard Ashby's 1987 piece entitled "Library Services to Lesbian and Gay People" have argued that this commitment to neutrality should provide the foundation for complete library service for all people, regardless of sexual orientation or gender presentation. Ashby argues that libraries, especially in their role as providers of literature for pleasure reading, can support LGBTQ individuals overcome a sense of isolation within the larger community. He emphasizes the importance of staff education to provide all LGBTQ individuals a safe space within the library, including:

- Training staff to work with diverse populations, specifically LGBTQ patrons
- Comprehensive and effective collection development policies for LGBTQ materials
- Librarian education to gain familiarity with publishers or sources for LGBTQ materials, including the utilization of local bookstores or community groups.

Echoing many of Ashby's assertions in her 2007 paper entitled "Can Scottish public library services claim they are socially inclusive of all minority groups when lesbian fiction is still so inaccessible?", Jaqueline Goldthorp outlines some of the challenges that lesbians face when trying to find lesbian fiction in Scottish libraries. She ties her study of lesbian literature to the importance of reading fiction on the psychological well-being of women, arguing that women often turn to fiction reading for self-affirmation and identity building. In addition, lesbian fiction titles can be priced up to 30% higher than non-lesbian titles, meaning that, for many low-income or working class lesbians, libraries are the only means of access for these titles Goldthorp surveyed 26 Scottish libraries and found that, in 2007, the majority had less than ten books labelled as "lesbian fiction," and almost no recent award-winning titles. She suggests diversity training and education about methods and resources for providing service to lesbians for library staff as a way of promoting greater inclusion.

Mehra and Braquet's 2007 article "Library and Information Science Professionals as Community Action Researchers in an Academic Setting" expands further upon the central role of librarians in promoting LGBTQ acceptance, noting that the profession is "uniquely situated to provide access to LGBT literature and information."

In the UK 2016 research by Janine Walker and Jo Bates found that Section 28 still had a lasting effect on school libraries, with very little LGBTQ+ literature available or support from librarians being given. Later in 2019, John Vincent said that through his research he still met British librarians who assumed Section 28 was still in place.

=== Book bans ===
Conservative objections of certain titles available in public and school libraries have had a resurgence in 2021 and 2022, in USA States such as Florida, Wyoming and Texas. One legislator in Texas proposed a list of books to be banned in school libraries, which when analyzed were found to be 62% LGBTQ titles.

The American Library Association maintains a lists of the most challenged books of the year, as well as the most challenged books of the decade, using data collected by their Office of Intellectual Freedom. This data has been collected for three decades now, and materials relating to LGBTQ topics make up a notable portion of these lists time and time again. For example, a study found that "[f]rom 2001 to 2015, sixteen books (22%) on ALA's top ten list were challenged for homosexuality."

Nonprofit organization PEN America has similarly been collecting data on book ban attempts in schools across the nation. Their 2021-2022 report found that out of the 1,648 unique book titles banned during the period studied (July 2021 - June 2022), over 40% of them dealt with LGBTQ themes and/or have major characters that identify as members of the LGBTQ community. As the data PEN America pulls from is limited to publicly accessible records and news sources, it is possible the true scope of banned LGBTQ titles is much greater.

In response to the bans, the Queer Liberation Library was formed in 2023 to give anyone residing in the United States digital access to LGBTQ books.

== Collection development considerations ==
=== Barriers ===
In a 2005 article in the journal Progressive Librarian, Jennifer Downey argued that even award-winning books by or about LGBTQ individuals fail to make it into library collections. She cites internal censorship as one potential cause, as well as the assumption that library patrons who want LGBTQ titles will simply request them from other libraries via inter-library loan. In addition, she found that many librarians were unfamiliar with LGBTQ titles. To increase familiarity, she recommends reading LGBTQ book review sources and bringing others, including community members into the process, suggestions which she draws from Loverich and Degnan's 1999 article "Out of the Shelves".

=== Small publishers ===
A 2012 Publishers Weekly article cites the growing diversity of small presses that publish LGBTQ titles, but a decline in the traditional romance and erotica genres. The article also discusses the mainstreaming of LGBT literature, though emphasizes that even with wider acceptance of LGBTQ identities, the need for LGBTQ stories has not disappeared and that independent publishers are still the largest producers of LGBTQ literature. In his "Rainbow Family Collections", Jamie Naidoo also discusses challenges facing small specialized publishers of LGBTQ children's books and includes interviews with select publishing houses. Smaller publishers also struggle with their titles being found on discovery platforms where their catalogue records often have less detailed metadata.

== LGBTQ, classification and subject headings ==
Before the 1960s, the term "homosexuality" was the basic search heading for most libraries that adopted the Library of Congress Subject Headings. According to LGBT librarian Steve Wolf, "homosexuality" was classified under "sexual deviations" until 1972, when it was moved to "sexual life". Since then, individuals who identify as LGBTQ have made major strides in reforming the subject headings that many libraries use. The Library of Congress added "Transgender people" and "Transgenderism" as main subject headings in 2007. Creating new and accurate headings for the LGBTQ community makes it easier for LGBTQ people to find information that is pertinent to their needs.

Recent literature has approached the issue of library classification from a queer theory perspective. In her 2013 article "Queering the Catalog: Queer Theory and the Politics of Correction", librarian Emily Drabinski defines the relationship between LGBTQ identity and the library as a historically contingent one. For Drabinski, "there can be no "correct" categorical or linguistic structures, only those that discursively emerge and circulate in a particular context." Drabinski says that a queer approach to cataloging includes reference librarians and users, who can engage in dialogue about underlying biases and help dismantle oppressive language. In a 2014 article, Drabinski, Amber Billey and K.R. Roberto criticized RDA Rule 9.7, which forces catalogers to assign a gender when creating authority records, leaving out non-binary and gender-fluid identities. Marika Cifor uses queer theory to argue that hatred should be used as an organizing principle in LGBT archives. She writes that "examining the arrangement and description of hate mail and messages, archival collecting around hate crimes, and documenting and describing queer and trans self-hatred demonstrates that hatred is a useful lens for examining and deconstructing normative power and its affective circulations and structures."

Homosaurus is an extensive LGBTQ+ controlled vocabulary that has been adopted by some academic and public libraries.

== LGBTQ children and teen services ==
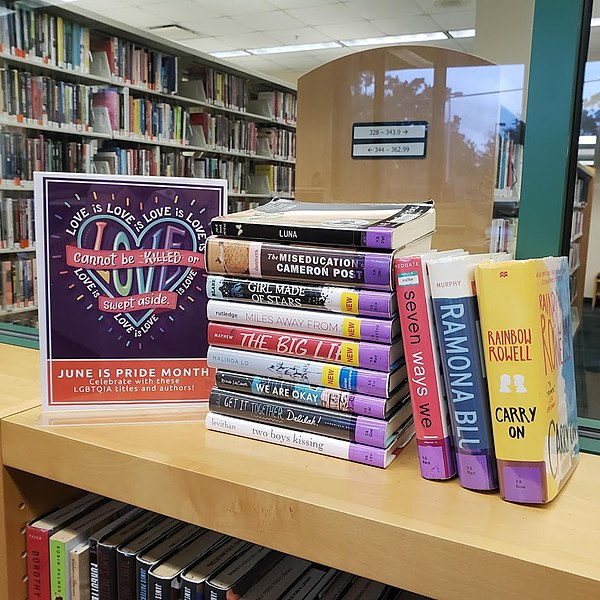
A 2018 display of young adult books featuring LGBTQ+ characters or themes at the Barbara S. Ponce Public Library in Pinellas Park, Florida

Alexander Parks and others have identified libraries as potentially important safe places for LGBTQ youth and teens, especially in the face of bullying. He suggests the inclusion of LGBTQ titles in library displays or book talks to promote greater visibility. However, according to a 2005 study by Ann Curry, though many LGBTQ teens have the very similar concerns to their adult counterparts, librarians often do not answer their questions related to LGBTQ topics in a sensitive or welcoming manner. Studies by Carmichael and Greenblatt have emphasized that the library is an important place for teens who are coming out to find information because of the potential anonymity it provides. In his examination of public libraries in areas with large concentrations of same-sex families, Naidoo finds that many children's librarians are unaware of the LGBTQ families in their community and provide a mixed-bag of services, collections, and programs.

According to the Young Adult Library Services Association's information for being welcoming and inclusionary of trans teens at library programs offering a time for students to give their preferred names or pronouns when starting a program gives them the opportunity to let staff and fellow patrons know how they would prefer to be addressed.

=== Impact of the Internet ===
LGBTQ individuals were some of the early adopters of the internet, and are still represented in high percentages across social media. In addition, 55% of LGBTQ individuals who responded to a 2009 survey said that they read blogs, compared to 38% of heterosexual respondents. The internet can often be influential to young people seeking information about health, coming out, or to find community, but can also put teens at risk of cyberbullying or harassment. Some libraries and schools, notably the school district in Camdenton, Missouri, have been ordered to remove internet filtering software that blocked access to LGBTQ friendly websites that teens often turn to for support.

=== Drag Queen Story Time ===
Libraries have been one of the main hosts of Drag Queen Story Hours (also known as Drag Queen Storytime) since the concept creation by Michelle Tea in 2015. Whilst they have been popular busy events internationally, they have also been controversial attracting protests and complaints to libraries. In some communities, the concept of Drag Queen Story Hour can be controversial and might not be universally accepted, potentially leading to protests or boycotts of the library.

While Drag Queen Story Hour offers a range of benefits from educational to social, it's not without its challenges and criticisms. The success of the program often depends on careful planning, community involvement, and a clear understanding of the objectives and potential pitfalls.

== User studies related to LGBTQ library services ==
=== Creelman and Harris (1990) ===
Possibly the first study to provide a comprehensive overview of the information needs of non-heterosexual people, Creelman and Harris' article focused on lesbians' information needs at specific points in their lives. They used a sense-making model which considered lesbians' information needs within a particular context. Their data came from a series of 50 interviews with lesbian women who were part of a lesbian group in Toronto, Canada, and used the snowball sampling approach to recruit additional participants. Eighty-four percent of interviewees said that they were aware of the library as a source of information related to lesbian identities, compared to 62% who were aware of gay bars and 58% aware of gay and lesbian organizations. However, the authors found many respondents were frustrated with the negative or male-centric literature that made up the bulk of information available in libraries; libraries needed to ensure that information was readily available, current and positive to best serve lesbian populations.

=== Whitt (1993) ===
Alisa Whitt's 1993 study also focused on the information needs of lesbians and what lesbians expected from the library during different life stages. Whitt collected data by sending out a survey via a lesbian newsletter that circulated in North Carolina, which drew 141 respondents.

For many lesbians who responded to Whitt's survey, the library was the most important source for locating information during the initial stages of coming out, especially in remote areas without a visible community. Whitt determined three shifts in the type of information desired by respondents, from early in the coming out process to a later, more established identity. She found that information needs went from broad to specifically focused, from factual or non-fiction to entertainment or fiction and that respondents became more discerning about the information they needed with age.

Many respondents who never used the library cited embarrassment or lack of knowledge about available information as reasons. Even those that did frequent the library often said that they were too embarrassed to ask for help; many expected shocked reactions or outright homophobia from librarians. Some common complaints about library collections from those who did use them were that information was negative, outdated or difficult to find. Whitt concluded that more staff training was needed to address these perceptions. She also found that those respondents who regularly used a college or university library had a more positive experience finding needed information than those who used only the public library.

=== Joyce and Schrader (1997) ===
In the first user study specifically addressed towards gay males, Joyce and Schrader studied perceptions of the library system in Edmonton, Canada. Using an anonymous questionnaire distributed to gay community organizations, the authors collected data on 21 questions related to three aspects of information seeking: personal information, information needs related to coming out and ongoing information needs. The survey had 47 respondents who had a generally high level of education.

The library was the most often cited resource of information related to coming out and for ongoing needs, followed by gay organizations and friends. When asked what types of materials respondents borrowed from the library, they most frequently cited music, followed by nonfiction and fiction. However, respondents had an overall negative impression about the amount of information related to gay males contained in the library, and suggested the need for expanding the gay collection, networking with gay and lesbian organizations and subscribing to gay magazines.

Joyce and Schrader found similarities between their study and the ones by Whitt and Creelman and Harris which came before it. Some of the common themes included the importance of the library, especially in the early stages of coming out, the need for more specific information over time and the general lack of services.

=== Norman (1999) ===
Norman's 1999 study provides quantitative analysis of survey responses from 44 self-identified lesbian, gay and bisexual individuals using the Brighton and Hove (UK) public libraries. The survey was aimed at identifying five aspects of the libraries' LGB users, including demographics, the effect of centralizing a collection, whether LGB individuals use bibliographies to find reading as well as reasons for using and perceptions of library service. Results of the survey were analyzed using SPSS.

Results indicated that fiction or other materials for entertainment were the most popular materials from the library, and that more than half used bibliographies to locate new reading materials. Many respondents cited the high prices of gay or lesbian books as one of the reasons for heavy use of the library. Though some respondents felt that the balance of lesbian to gay titles was skewed in favor of lesbian titles, the overall perception of Hove and Brighton's services to LGB patrons was excellent or good.

=== Rothbauer (2004) ===
As an offshoot of her dissertation research, Rothbauer interviewed 17 self-identified lesbian, bisexual and queer women between the ages of 18 and 23 about their discretionary reading habits. To analyze the data, she used open-coding techniques for textual analysis, and also relied on some participant writing and journals.

Rothbauer's findings indicate that fiction reading is an aspirational activity for young lesbian, bisexual and queer women; many participants hoped that fiction would show the "possibilities of claiming a queer identity" and were frustrated by works that contained an overly negative or homophobic view of lesbian life. Rothbauer identified four trends in her participants reading choices:

- An orientation towards the future
- A rejection of the standard coming-out narratives
- A desire to read about "being lesbian," "being queer," and "being bisexual"
- A connection with the "textual other"

Interviewees also reported feeling a greater connection to community through reading, whether it was through joining fan communities of favorite authors, or discussing and sharing books with others.

The public library was one of the most important points of access for interviewees, along with the internet and bookstores. Interviewees often relied heavily on online library catalogs as safe, anonymous searches to explore lesbian fiction. Participants often did not find what they were looking for in online catalogs, but were not surprised by the lack of materials. Rothbauer suggests making materials more visible, and also improving the scope and currency of library holdings to reach these users.

=== Beiriger and Jackson (2007) ===
In an effort to rectify the lack of research related to the information needs of transgender individuals, Beiriger and Jackson's article surveyed the transgender population in the Transgender/Identity Resource Center (TiRC) in Portland, Oregon. Using a survey tool adapted from the Gay, Lesbian, Bisexual, and Transgender Wellness Project of Ottawa-Carleton, Canada, the authors distributed the survey through TiRC staff and counselors, as well as online through listserves and websites.

Analysis of the 99 responses to the survey show that the library is one of the last places that transgender people turn for information due to lack of up to date health information, or an unwelcoming environment. Library collections meant to support the needs of transgender individuals were generally less comprehensive than those serving their gay and lesbian counterparts. The authors found that librarians should do more outreach to transgender communities to communicate a message of welcome, and that the internet could be a potentially powerful tool for outreach to these underrepresented populations.

=== National Park Service (2016) ===
The United States National Park Service officially unveiled a study of the history of the LGBTQ community on National Coming Out Day, Tuesday, October 11, during the second week of LGBT History Month. The library and preservation communities hope this study "will assist in the protection of various LGBTQ historic sites across the country."

== Organizations ==
=== Gay, Lesbian, Bisexual, and Transgender Round Table (GLBTRT) ===
Founded in 1970, the Gay, Lesbian, Bisexual, and Transgender Round Table (GLBTRT), now known as the Rainbow Round Table, is a subdivision of the American Library Association. Its goals are both to support library professionals who identify as LGBTQ as well as promote access to LGBTQ materials for library users. In addition, GLBTRT seeks to create new classification schemes for LGBTQ books that do not stigmatize these identities, and promote access under the ALA's Code of Ethics and Library Bill of Rights. The GLBTRT also administers the yearly Stonewall Book Awards for juvenile, young adult, and adult LGBTQ fiction.

=== Diverse Sexuality and Gender Section ===
The Diverse Sexuality and Gender Section is a group within the Society of American Archivists, founded in 1989, which advocates for the preservation of materials related to LGBT history within the archival profession. It was formerly called the Lesbian and Gay Archivists Roundtable, with the name changed to the Diverse Sexuality and Gender Section, known as DSGS for short, at the section's 2017 annual meeting. In August 2020, DSGS held a joint meeting with the Women's Collections Section on Zoom.

In 2017, the section proposed the creation of a Tragedy Response Initiative Task Force to create and compile material for ready accessibility by archivists that are "facing a sudden tragedy" and to explore the feasibility of creating a standing body "within SAA that would update documentation as needed and serve as a volunteer tragedy response team." The section also maintains Lavender Legacies, a directory of LGBTQ collections in North American archival repositories.

=== Lesbian, Gay, Bisexual, Transgender, Queer/Questioning (LGBTQ) Users Special Interest Group (SIG) ===
The International Federation of Library Associations and Institutions (IFLA) LGBTQ Users SIG is charged to address the gap in professional knowledge of LGBTQ users' needs by offering opportunities to engage in discussions about this often invisible user group. This SIG considers topics including professional attitudes, outreach, privacy, programming, and effective practice in acquiring and collecting materials of importance to LGBTQ people and allies and encourages thoughtful consideration of issues of sexuality and gender identity.

=== Lesbian, Gay, Bisexual and Transgendered Health Science Librarians Special Interest Group (SIG) ===
The Lesbian, Gay, Bisexual and Transgendered Health Science Librarians Special Interest Group (SIG) is a unit of the Medical Library Association. Its goals are to identify, collect and disseminate gay/lesbian/bisexual health care information within the Medical Library Association in order to enhance the quality and quantity of information available to colleagues within the association and within members' institutions in order to support the physical and psychological health care concerns of medical library clients.

=== Lesbian, Gay, Bisexual and Transgendered Special Interest Group (LGBT SIG) ===
Formerly the Gay and Lesbian Interests/Issues Round Table (GLIRT), the LGBT SIG is part of the Art Libraries Society of North America. They focus on the professional and cultural aspects of the LGBTQ Community through discussion and the informal exchange of information in yearly meetings during the ARLIS/NA Conference.

=== CILIP LGBTQ+ Network ===
Active in the United Kingdom since 2020, the network seeks to "represent all UK LGBTQ+ Library Knowledge & Information workers", membership is open to both CILIP and non-CILIP members.

=== GLBT Book Month ===
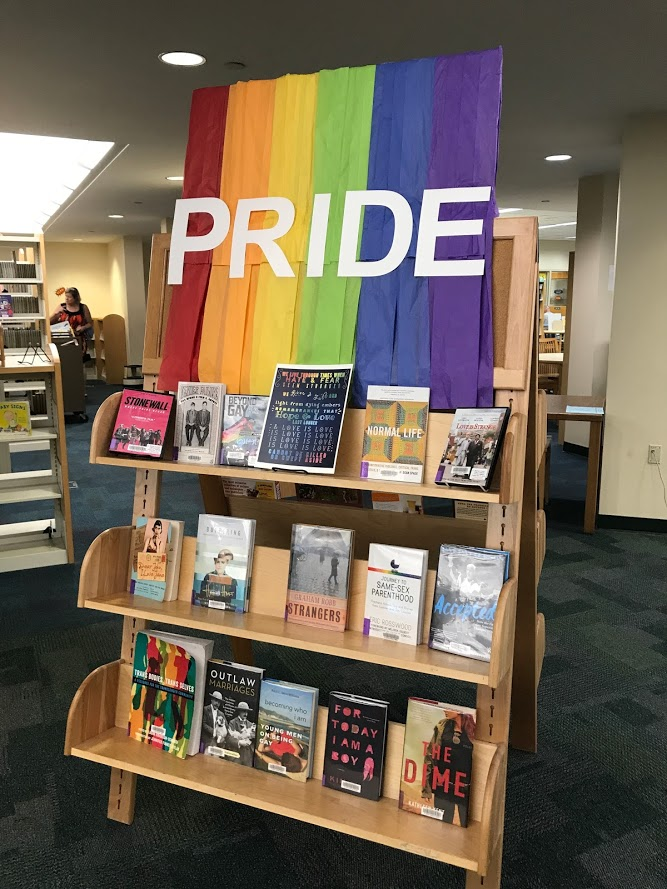
A 2017 LGBTQ+ Pride book display at the Barbara S. Ponce Public Library in Pinellas Park, Florida

Starting in 2015, the American Library Association marked June to be GLBT Book Month, a nationwide celebration of the authors and writings that reflect the lives and experiences of the gay, lesbian, bisexual, and transgender community.

Originally established in the early 1990s by The Publishing Triangle as National Lesbian and Gay Book Month, this occasion is an opportunity for book lovers and libraries with the very best in GLBT literature. GLBT Book Month is an initiative of the American Library Association, and is coordinated through its Office for Diversity, Literacy, and Outreach Services and the Gay, Lesbian, Bisexual, and Transgender Round Table.

=== Transgender Archives at the University of Victoria ===
The Transgender Archives at the University of Victoria are located at the University of Victoria Libraries Special Collections and University Archives, in Victoria, British Columbia, Canada. The Archives are free to visit and are open to the public, students, faculty, and scholars.

== See also ==
- Category:LGBTQ museums and archives

== Additional resources ==
=== Adult services ===
- Antell, K.; Strothmann, M.; Downey, J. (2013). "Self-Censorship in Selection of LGBT-Themed Materials". Reference & User Services Quarterly. 53 (2): 104–107. doi:10.5860/rusq.53n2.104.
- Joyce, Steven L (2000). "Lesbian, Gay, and Bisexual Library Service: A Review of the Literature". Public Libraries. 39 (5): 270–9.
- Kingston, M. Information needs of GLBT College Students. Thesis, Indiana University, 1998.
- Morris, Martin; Roberto, K.R. (2016). "Information-seeking behaviour and information needs of LGBTQ health professionals: a follow-up study". Health Information & Libraries Journal. 33 (3): 204–221. doi:10.1111/hir.12139. PMID 27060995.
- O'Leary, M. "Pink perceptions: The information needs of lesbian, gay, bisexual, and transgender library users as perceived by public librarians and by the LGBT communities within Sheffield, UK and Denver, CO. USA" Thesis, University of Sheffield: 2005.
- Passet, Joanne E (2012). "Hidden in Plain Sight: Gay and Lesbian Books in Midwestern Public Libraries, 1900--1969". Library Trends. 60 (3): 749–64. doi:10.1353/lib.2012.0010. hdl:2142/31902. S2CID 30107318.
- Ritchie, Catherine J. "Collection Development of gay/lesbian/bisexual-Related Adult Non-Fiction in Medium-Sized Illinois Public Libraries." Illinois Libraries 83.2 (2001): 39–70. Library Literature and Information Science. Web. 12 Mar. 2013.
- Rothbauer, Paulette (2004). "The Internet in the Reading Accounts of Lesbian and Queer Young Women: Failed Searches and Unsanctioned Reading". Canadian Journal of Information and Library Science. 28 (4): 89–112.
- Stenback, T.L.; Schrader, A.M. Venturing from the closet: A qualitative study of the information needs of lesbians. Pub. Libr. Quart. 1999; 17 (3), 37–50.

=== Cataloging ===
- GLBT Controlled Vocabularies and Classification Schemes

=== Children and teen services ===
- Abate, Michelle Ann and Kenneth Kidd, eds., Over the Rainbow: Queer Children's and Young Adult Literature (Ann Arbor: The University of Michigan Press, 2001).
- Austin, J. (2019). Lines of sight and knowledge: Possibilities and actualities of trans and gender non-conforming youth in the library. In Bharat Mehra (ed.) LGBTQ+ librarianship in the 21st century: Emerging directions of advocacy and community engagement in diverse information environments (Advances in Librarianship, volume 45). Emerald Publishing Limited, 167–196.
- Booth, E., & Narayan, B. (2018). “Don't talk about the gay character’: Barriers to queer young adult fiction and authors in schools and libraries English in Australia, 53(2), 40–48.
- Chapman, E (2013). "No More Controversial than a Gardening Display? Provision of LGBT-Related Fiction to Children and Young People in U.K. Public Libraries". Library Trends. 61 (3): 542–568. doi:10.1353/lib.2013.0010. hdl:2142/46042. S2CID 5856431.
- Chuang, L.; Raine, G.; Scott, D.; Tauro, K. (2013). "Out in Society, Invisible on the Shelves: Discussing LIS Literature about LGBTQ Youth". Feliciter. 59 (5): 26–27.
- Hillias J. Martin Jr. and James R. Murdock, Serving Lesbian, Gay, Bisexual, Transgender, and Questioning Teens: A How-to-do-it Manual for Librarians (New York: Neal-Schuman Publishers, 2007).
- Hughes-Hassell, S.; Overberg, E.; Harris, S. (2013). "Lesbian, Gay, Bisexual, Transgender, and Questioning (LGBTQ)-Themed Literature for Teens: Are School Libraries Providing Adequate Collections?". School Library Research. 16: 1–18.
- Jamie Campbell Naidoo, Rainbow Family Collections: Selecting and Using Children's Books with Lesbian, Gay, Bisexual, Transgender, and Queer Content (Santa Barbara: Libraries Unlimited, 2012)
- Parks, A (2012). "Opening the Gate". Young Adult Library Services. 10 (4): 22–27.
- Stringer-Stanback, Kynita (2011). "Young Adult Lesbian, Gay, Bisexual, Transgender, and Questioning (LGBTQ) Non-Fiction Collections and Countywide Anti-Discrimination Policies". Urban Library Journal. 17 (1): 1–27. doi:10.31641/ulj170104.
- Vincent, John (2014). LGBT+ People and the UK Cultural Sector. (London: Routledge)

=== History ===
- Carmichael, James V. Daring to Find Our Names: The Search for Lesbigay Library History, Praeger, 1998, ISBN 978-0313299636
- Gittings, Barbara. Gays in Library Land: The Gay and Lesbian Task Force of the American Library Association: The First Sixteen Years, 1990
