= Censorship of educational research databases =

Attempts to block certain educational content for students

Censorship of educational research databases in the United States has been a concerted political effort since 2016. Activist groups that aim to change school curricula and ban books from libraries and schools are applying political and legislative pressure to limit the content in educational research databases to which libraries subscribe to give students online access to educational resources beyond what print collections can offer. In 2017, the American Library Association (ALA) found that 18% of challenges to library content were not book challenges, but about databases, games, and other non-book content. In 2023, ALA received reports of 1,247 localized censorship attempts on library resources, including databases. Recently, however, many of the educational research database censorship efforts take place in state legislatures; Idaho, Utah, Tennessee, and Oklahoma have encoded laws that specifically relate to educational research databases. Several states have failed legislative efforts, while other states have pending legislation in the 2024 season. Experts argue that these laws act on problems that do not actually exist. Where legislating about educational research databases specifically has been unsuccessful, activists have moved to attempting to curtail the long-held legal definition of "obscenity," as defined by the United States Supreme Court in Miller v. California, known as the Miller Test. For example, recent Tennessee legislation removes protections for materials with educational value from being defined as "obscene."

== Definition ==
In this instance, an "educational research database" is a collection of educational resources libraries purchase to supplement print books, often created to serve a particular age group or audience. The contents of educational research databases are either selected or written by the company that publishes it. For example, Britannica School is an online encyclopedia, primarily written by subject matter experts and by the editorial staff of Encyclopedia Britannica, Inc. for use in schools. Others, like EBSCO's Middle Online Package collection bring together newspaper and magazine articles, books, and more from a variety of popular and academic publishers.

The purpose of educational research databases is to have resources that will help users answer research questions. A student might use educational research databases to access local newspapers, popular magazines, and encyclopedias. In many cases, these sources would be behind paywalls on the open web, and therefore inaccessible. Database companies offer many different products, in order to provide useful resources, specially created for the students in school libraries, the researchers in college libraries, and the general adult users who mostly access public libraries; each type of library purchases the databases that serve their specific populations' needs. Companies diversify their products for K-12 schools even further by age of user.

Many states buy access to specific, K-12 educational research databases for use by students within the state. State libraries, departments of education, or similar governmental institutions run such initiatives. It is a relatively inexpensive way to assure job readiness and equity of access to educational resources for all of the K-12 students in a state.

Conservative activists state that their concerns are with content within databases sold to K-12 institutions, and—increasingly—public and college libraries. Their primary claim is that educational research databases include content that is harmful to minors. This claim has neither been sustained in court, nor have the search results presented as evidence been replicable when tested. Similarly, activists falsely claim that educational research databases bypass school internet filters. Evidence for these claims often comes from following links onto the open web, or "database hopping," which is moving from K-12 databases to public library databases that are aimed at a wider audience and include sources for adults. Critics of these claims, like Oklahoma State Representative Andy Fugate, note that these actions are taken in support of political goals.

== History ==
A concerted political effort has arisen in the United States to pass laws that limit access to certain topics within educational research databases, specifically information on LGBTQ-related topics, human sexuality, race and racism, and other topics common in book banning efforts.

In documented cases of people discovering content labeled "pornographic" or "obscene," the searchers have not been students. According to the Omaha World-Herald, neither of the Nebraskan politicians promoting legislative controls on database access are aware of any times that Nebraska students have encountered obscene materials on educational research databases. Furthermore, one of these politicians told the World-Herald, "Sometimes, you have to go quite a ways to find it." Specifically, she told the paper that the K-12 educational research databases had no objectionable content, and she had to move to research databases created for older users in order to find content she disliked. Similarly, in her testimony to the Nebraska Legislature's Judiciary Committee, Representative Joni Albrecht noted that it took "three clicks" at the least, to get to the sites like Pornhub; sites which were not actually part of the educational research database's content, but on the public web. Experts have not been able to replicate many of the examples of problematic search results.

=== Challenges ===
Two challenges to educational research databases have received particularly broad attention nationwide.

==== Cherry Creek School District ====
The first known challenge to a database was introduced in January, 2017, at a Cherry Creek School District Board of Education meeting in Greenwood Village, Colorado. Drew and Robin Paterson, parents of a student in the district, accessed their student's school-provided educational research database and found links within the content to sites that they labeled "pornographic." Reporting on the case notes that the parents, and not the student, accessed these public internet sources. The educational research database in question was published by EBSCO, whose spokespeople point out that the database itself covers mainstream publications, and that the links in question were embedded in articles from Time Magazine, Men's Health and Women's Health magazines.

EBSCO reported that it remained unaware of any occasions on which children had used its databases to access pornography, but nonetheless reviewed its selection process and clarified its policies and technology in 2017.

In 2017 and 2018, the National Center on Sexual Exploitation (formerly Morality in Media) listed EBSCO on its "Dirty Dozen," its annual list of organizations that it believes forwards exploitation of children. Other organizations that have been on the list include the American Library Association, United Airlines, the United States Department of Defense, and more.

The Patersons founded several groups, including "Pornography is Not Education" (PINE) and Colorado's chapter of "MassResistance" to advocate for the notion that EBSCO intentionally providing links that are "a few clicks" from online pornography. Under the auspices of PINE, the Patersons filed a lawsuit in Arapahoe District Court against the EBSCO and the Colorado Library Consortium (CLiC), the state organization that purchases educational research databases and other library materials for school and public library users across Colorado. Matt F. Heffron, an attorney for the Nebraska-based, conservative Catholic law firm, Thomas More Society, represented them. The Thomas More Society primarily supports anti-abortion movements activists, but also attacked the Common Core standards, sex education programs, and other school programs as attempting to promote pornography to children. CLiC was represented by Seter & Vander Wall, P.C. On February 15, 2019, all parties agreed to dismiss all claims against CLiC. On February 25, 2019, PINE also elected to dismiss its claims against EBSCO with prejudice, meaning the lawsuit cannot be refiled, usually because the "merits" of the case are not sound. However, after two years of pressure, Cherry Creek School District also dropped EBSCO databases in favor of databases from a different company. CLiC estimated that the lawsuit cost at least $35,000, equivalent to seven years of book budgets for a small public library, plus many hours of labor.

After the lawsuit was dismissed, Heffron noted that repeat lawsuits would still be possible because EBSCO databases are used in schools across the country. From Colorado, activism spread to both Indiana and Utah. Over 130 school districts have cancelled their contracts with EBSCO. Losing access to EBSCO databases removes almost 97,000 un-challenged titles—more than 175 million articles—from student educational access, when the educational research database content that is objectionable to the complainants do not meet standards for obscenity or pornography.

==== Utah challenge ====
In 2018, president of the conservative Empowered Families Coalition, Nicholeen P. Peck, reported that she discovered pornography through the EBSCO databases provided by the Utah Education Network, the government department that oversees the state's public schools. In response to political pressure, Utah closed down its K-12 EBSCO subscription for all of its students statewide, blocking over 650,000 students. After a month of investigations, during which the Utah Education and Telehealth Network Board president stated that they were not able to replicate any of the problematic results advocates reported, even following the directions provided by those conservative activists, and the board voted unanimously to turn database access back on. EBSCO was also unable to replicate the search results in their own investigations. The executive director of the Salt Lake City Public Library noted that the accusations were intentionally false and misleading. He argued that conservative activists found certain content personally distasteful and wanted to block it for all users.

The Utah Education Network began monitoring EBSCO use when the database was reinstated, to demonstrate it was being used appropriately. UEN reports currently blocking over 15,000 search terms in the school databases. The quarterly reports also include word clouds of searches that users carry out over the three month period. These reports indicate that users do not run inappropriate searches.

=== Enacted state legislation ===
Starting in 2020, Idaho, followed by Utah, Tennessee, and Oklahoma, passed laws criminalizing educational research databases. The language for all of these bills are quite similar to each other: the bills require companies providing K-12 databases to each of these states to verify that database content is free of obscene or pornographic content, requiring filtering of said content, and nullifying the contracts with any vendor that is believed to have served up such content.

Nationally, schools already filter web-based content, including educational research databases, in order to receive federal funding for internet access. State Representative Andy Fugate of Oklahoma notes that the Oklahoma bill comes from a piece of model legislation with political, rather than educational, goals.

Idaho was the first state to pass this type of legislation, in 2020, although it essentially mirrored K-12 internet use policies that had been in place for a decade. The bill sponsor erroneously claimed that "these databases are offline and not subject to internet filters." This claim is untrue. The bill, HB522 (2020) passed and was codified as Section 33-137 of the Idaho State Code. The Idaho Commission for Libraries, the official name of the state library, created a separate web portal for K-12 statewide database access with restricted services to comply with Code 33-137.

Utah was the second state to pass a bill, HB38, in the 2021 legislative season. Tennessee's SB2292/HB2454, which became Pub. Ch. 1002, followed in 2022. Additionally, Tennessee removed the educational value exception from the state's legal definition of obscenity, opening a wider array of curricular and co-curricular content to blocking.

Oklahoma passed HB3702 in 2022. Like with other bills, HB3702 replicates already-existing protections encoded in law.

Nebraska's Representative Albrecht introduced LB1213 in 2022, and again in 2023 as LB635. In addition to provisions similar to earlier bills in other states, this bill requires each student to have an individual username and password. Currently, educational research database access usually by IP-address, meaning that anyone on the school's internet can use the databases. Additionally, the bill requires that each student's username and password be given to the student's parents so that they can also access their student's account.

Heffron, the Thomas More Society attorney who represented the Patersons in Colorado, helped author the Nebraska bill. Heffron stated that he hoped the bill would become model legislation for other states.

In 2023, Mississippi passed HB1315 which was quite similar to the majority of prior bills, although it specified that post-secondary students, included dual-enrollment students, were not held to the same restrictions as most K-12 students. Additionally, the bill exempts search engines and ISPs from the same restrictions as educational research databases now receive.

From 2020 to 2022, similar bills died in Georgia, Minnesota, and Texas. A resolution to launch a task force to investigate educational research databases also died in Hawaii.

== 2024 pending legislation trends ==
In addition to legislation that, as in prior years, aims to limit access to information available through educational research databases, anti-database legislation has become more diverse in nature. In 2024, multiple states are striving to redefine "obscenity" or "harmful to minors" beyond the bounds of the Miller Test and other legal tests, so that more books and articles may be included. Some states, such as Arizona and Georgia, have pending legislation that simply sidesteps the term "obscenity" altogether, and are legislating against "sexually explicit materials," which do not have a formal legal definition and therefore makes it much easier to spread a wider net for banning, filtering, or suppression. Additionally, many states have proposed legislation that criminalizes librarians and educators, making them personally—and often criminally—liable for allowing minors to access resources with content about human sexuality, and possibly race.

== Responses and impacts ==
As of March 2024, educational research database companies have displayed a variety of responses. Some, like EBSCO, did audit the behavior and content of their databases, tweaking some aspects of functionality. Then, when Utah turned off its students' access, EBSCO responded by creating local controls with which districts, or whole states, can block access to resources for students. For example, Utah blocks over 1500 potential search terms for all students statewide. Other companies have proactively censored certain terms, making them unsearchable, for all students nationwide. For example, many Gale K-12 databases will not allow students to search for any form of the word "sex," meaning they cannot look up health information, information on sexual discrimination, sexual orientation, and more.

The chilling effect of political actions is one of the major impacts on students' access to information: conservative activists have caused schools and districts nationwide to proactively drop or block educational resources out of fear of being targeted by activists or based on misinformation and misunderstandings of how educational research databases work. For example, some educators in Florida reported not being able to access educational videos about Brown v the Board of Education or Jim Crow laws. Other schools and districts followed their reconsideration policies and found that their databases do not, in fact contain obscene content based on legal definitions.

An unanticipated result of Oklahoma's HB3702 was that high school students in advanced classes reported trouble undertaking the required research. K-12 students were not allowed to independently access the more advanced sources necessary for their work due to the law. The Oklahoma law removes exemptions from prosecution for "employees of school districts, charter schools, virtual charter schools, state agencies, public libraries, and universities" who create "willful violations." The bill sponsor, former Representative Todd Russ, argued that it is primarily teachers and librarians who should be responsible for what students access, although the bill primarily relates to database companies themselves. As a result, the University of Oklahoma designated two librarian who have to "mediate" all K-12 students' searches, meaning the librarians do the research under instruction from the students, undermining their learning of advanced skills. In 2023, Oklahoma had to pass another law, SB2247, which spelled out that post-secondary institutions were not subject to HB3702.

Proposals such as Nebraska's pending legislation would make it nearly impossible to implement access to educational research databases at all. For example, requiring individual usernames to replace IP-access would mean, for example, that a high school of 3000 students, instead of having a single, school-wide login, would need to provide and manage 3000 separate usernames and passwords for its students.
