= Censorship of school curricula in the United States =

Suppression or prohibition of various topics in US schools

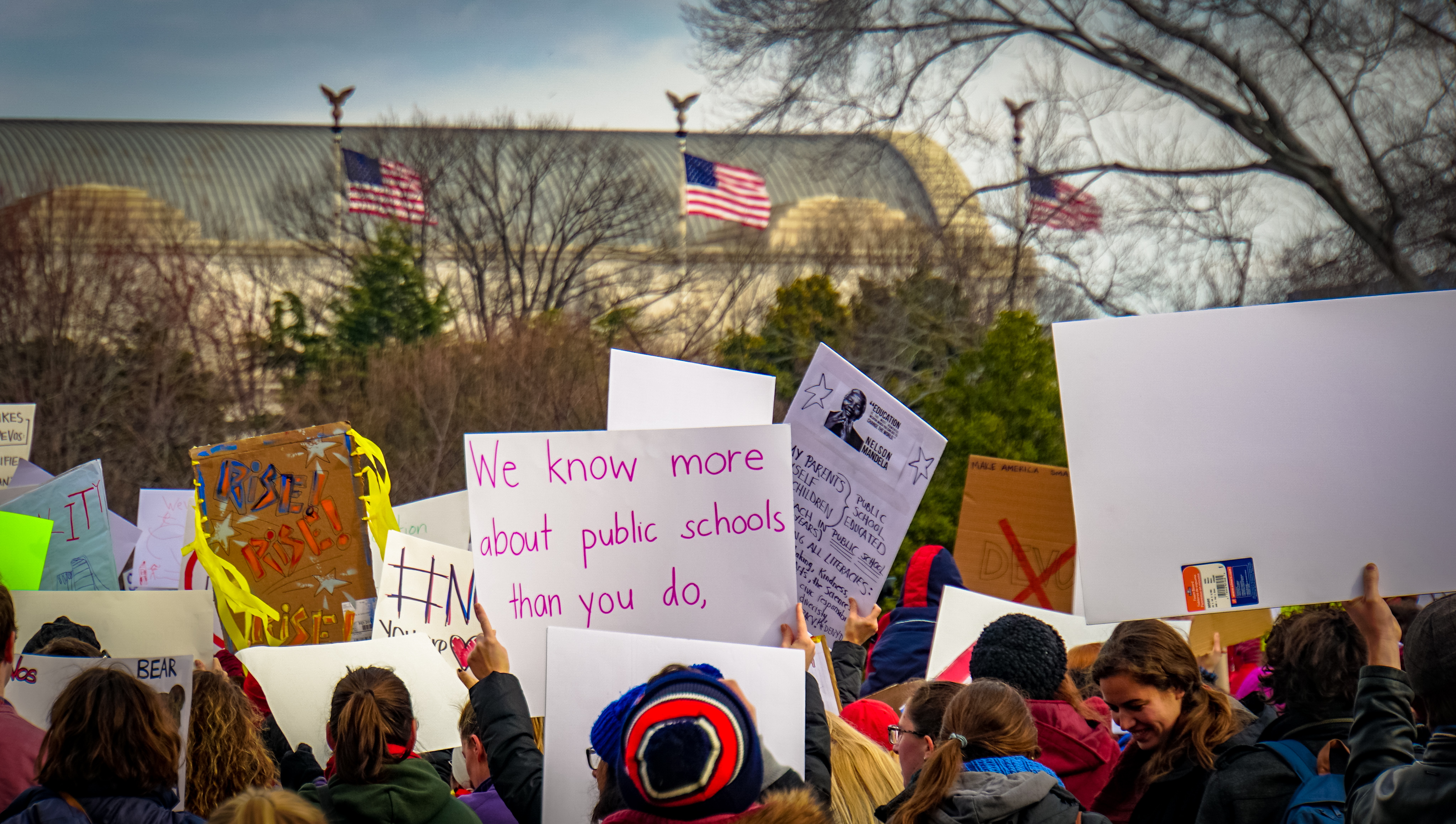
A crowd protesting then U.S. Secretary of Education Betsy DeVos in 2017

Throughout the history of the United States, various topics have been censored and banned in education, including teaching about evolution, racism, sexism, sex education, and LGBTQ+ topics. Due to the education system being highly decentralized, states are delegated with much of the responsibility for administering public education.

In 2021, bills were introduced in multiple state legislatures to restrict teaching certain concepts, including critical race theory (CRT) and sexism, in public schools. Bills were passed in 14 states, all of which had both Republican-majority legislatures and Republican governors. Several of these bills specifically mention "critical race theory" or single out the New York Times 1619 Project. CRT is only taught at a university level, though some lower-level curricula have reflected basic themes of CRT.

Other state-level efforts have involved state boards of education restricting the teaching of issues surrounding race and sex.

== History ==
=== 20th century ===
Some of the first evidence of censorship of school curriculum in the United States comes during the Civil War, when Southern textbook publishers removed material critical of slavery. After the Civil War, a vigorous movement from groups like the United Daughters of the Confederacy in the South promoted the Lost Cause of the Confederacy in schools. The movement censored any offending works and lead to "indoctrination of southern schoolchildren with aristocratic social values unchanged since the antebellum epoch."

During the 19th century's temperance movement, some school book publishers revised content to suit the anti-alcohol position.

In the 1920s, during the aftermath of World War I, conservatives across the country attempted to ban teaching on evolution. The Fundamentalist–Modernist Controversy brought a surge of opposition to the idea of evolution, and following the campaigning of William Jennings Bryan several states introduced legislation prohibiting the teaching of evolution. Legislators proposed more than 53 bills from 1922 to 1929 (twenty in state legislatures and two in Congress), five of which succeeded. Legislation was considered and defeated in 1922 in Kentucky and South Carolina, in 1923 passed in Oklahoma, Florida, and notably in 1925 in Tennessee, as the Butler Act. The American Civil Liberties Union (ACLU) offered to defend anyone who wanted to bring a test case against one of these laws. John T. Scopes accepted, and he started teaching his class evolution, in defiance of the Tennessee law. The resulting trial was widely publicized by H. L. Mencken among others, and is commonly referred to as the Scopes Trial. Scopes was convicted; however, the widespread publicity galvanized proponents of evolution. When the case was appealed to the Tennessee Supreme Court, the Court overturned the decision on a technicality (the judge had assessed the fine when the jury had been required to). Although it overturned the conviction, the Court decided that the law was not in violation of the First Amendment to the United States Constitution. The Court held:

We are not able to see how the prohibition of teaching the theory that man has descended from a lower order of animals gives preference to any religious establishment or mode of worship. So far as we know there is no religious establishment or organized body that has its creed or confession of faith any article denying or affirming such a theory. — John Thomas Scopes v. The State 154 Tenn. 105, 289 S.W. 363 (1927)

The interpretation of the Establishment Clause of the First Amendment up to that time was that Congress could not establish a particular religion as the State religion. Consequently, the Court held that the ban on the teaching of evolution did not violate the Establishment Clause, because it did not establish one religion as the "State religion." As a result of the holding, the teaching of evolution remained illegal in Tennessee, and continued campaigning succeeded in removing evolution from school textbooks throughout the United States.

In the 1960s, some movements sought to remove racist and sexist material from school textbooks. Historian Jonathan Zimmerman stated that in the 1960s, "there were history textbooks in this country, including in the North, that still described slavery as a mostly beneficent institution devised by benevolent white people to civilize savage Africans."

In 1980, a national survey co-sponsored by the Association of American Publishers, the American Library Association, and the Association for Supervision and Curriculum Development discovered that censorship of curriculum was occurring and increasing in public schools throughout the United States.

=== 21st century ===
Challenges or attempts to ban book titles increased in the 2020s, with most being written by or about people who are LGBTQ+, Black, Indigenous, and people of color.

In the 21st century Republican lawmakers have proposed or enacted legislation to censor school curricula that covered comprehensive sex education, LGBTQ issues, higher-order thinking skills, social justice, sexism and racism, and various left-wing political philosophies.

In 2003, the school board of the Cedarville, Arkansas school district voted in Counts v. Cedarville School District to prohibit students from reading the well-known Harry Potter book series on the grounds that the books encouraged "disobedience and disrespect for authority" and dealt with "witchcraft" and "the occult." After the vote, all Harry Potter novels could no longer be checked out from school libraries by pupils in the Cedarville school system without a signed permission form from a parent or guardian. On the basis that "the limits violated students' First Amendment freedom to read and receive information," the district court reversed the board's decision and ordered the books to be returned to open circulation.

As of August, 2023, 392 education "intimidation" bills have been introduced across the U.S.—all but 15 being led by Republican lawmakers. President of the American Federation of Teachers, Randi Weingarten, considers intimidation bills to be a form of indirect censorship, where instead of just banning topics or content outright, they seek to instill fear in professionals (teachers, librarians, administrators, or district specialists) as well as students.

States with laws restricting education on race in classrooms or state agencies States considering bills or policies that would restrict race education in schools or state agencies States that failed to pass this type of legislation States that have not introduced legislation on this topic

In mid-April 2021, a bill was introduced in the Idaho legislature that would effectively ban any educational entity from teaching or "advocating sectarianism", including critical race theory or other programs involving social justice. On May 4, 2021, the bill was signed into law by Governor Brad Little.

On June 10, 2021, at the urging of governor Ron DeSantis, the Florida State Board of Education unanimously voted to ban public schools from teaching parts of history which "denigrate the Founding Fathers".

The Florida Stop WOKE Act, standing for "Wrong to Our Kids and Employees", also known as the Individual Freedom Act, prohibits instruction and teaching that “espouses, promotes, advances, inculcates, or compels” certain topics of race and gender. The Stop W.O.K.E. Act was blocked from affecting higher education contexts, as it was a violation of the First and Fourteenth Amendments. It was also argued that the law violated the Equal Protection Clause.

Tennessee House Bill 580 was passed in May 2021 by the Tennessee 112th Regular Session state legislature. The law prohibits the teaching of 14 concepts surrounding race and gender discrimination, including the concept of systemic racism. No Black legislator voted for the bill. According to WLPN, the law 'bar(s) any lesson that causes an individual “discomfort, guilt, anguish, or another form of psychological distress” because of their race or sex.'

As of July 2021, 10 US states had introduced bills or taken other steps that would restrict how teachers discuss racism, sexism, and other "divisive issues", and 26 others were in the process of doing so. As of November 9, 2021, 28 US states had introduced such bills—all by Republican lawmakers. The Republican-majority North Carolina State Legislature passed a similar law, but it was vetoed by Democratic Governor Roy Cooper. Several other states introduced bills that failed to pass or as of November 2021 were still awaiting action. As of December 2021, 66 educational gag orders had been filed for the year in 26 state legislatures (12 bills had already been passed into law) that would inhibit teaching any race theory in schools, universities, or state agencies, by teachers, employers or contractors. Penalties vary, but predominantly include loss of funding for schools and institutions. However, in some cases the bills mandate firing of employees.

Governor of Virginia Glenn Youngkin made education a core part of his political platform while running for the office in 2021, including an explicit call to "ban" critical race theory from Virginia schools "on day one." Upon his election in November 2021, Youngkin reiterated that point, and upon his inauguration to the office on January 15, 2022, he signed his first executive order banning critical race theory in Virginia schools. Governor Youngkin later established an email "tip line" where parents, teachers, and students can report violations of the order. The tip line was quietly shut down in September 2022 after receiving very little volume.

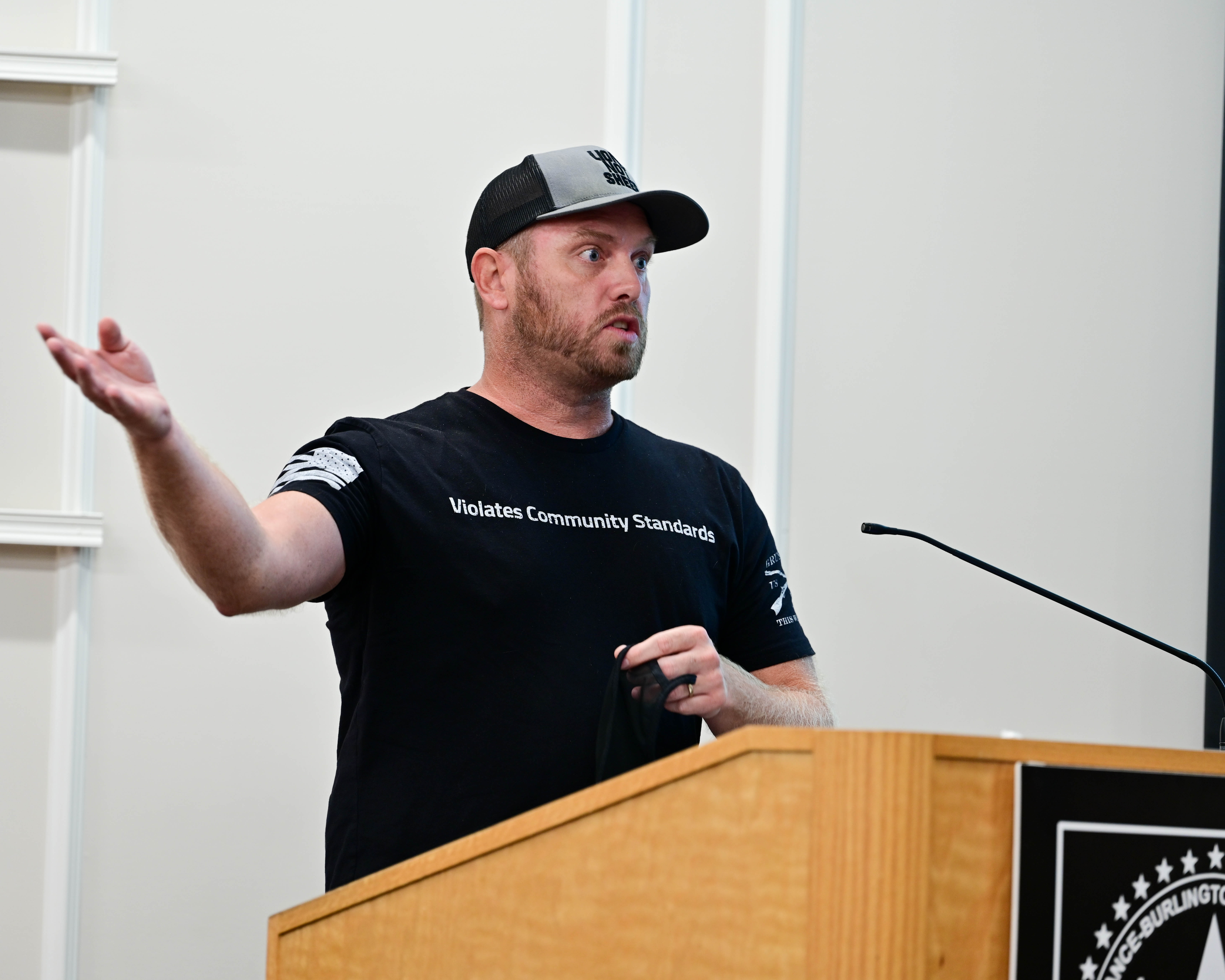
A protester speaks against critical race theory at an Alamance-Burlington School System board meeting in 2021.

Other state government officials and State Boards of Education (SBOE) adopted similar measures in 2021. Montana Attorney General Austin Knudsen prohibited teachers from asking students to "reflect on privilege". Utah's SBOE, at the request of the state legislature, restricted the teaching of racism and sexism. Alabama's SBOE banned the teaching of concepts that impute fault, blame, a tendency to oppress others, or the need to feel guilt or anguish to persons solely because of their race or sex.” Georgia's SBOE banned teaching that "indoctrinates" students. Florida's SBOE prohibited teaching about critical race theory or the 1619 Project.

==== Response ====
In June 2021, the American Association of University Professors, the American Historical Association, the Association of American Colleges and Universities, and PEN America released a joint statement stating their opposition to such legislation, and by August 2021, 167 professional organizations had signed onto the statement. In August 2021, the Brookings Institution recorded that eight states—Idaho, Oklahoma, Tennessee, Texas, Iowa, New Hampshire, Arizona, and South Carolina—had passed regulation on the issue, though also noted that none of the bills that passed, with the exception of Idaho's, actually contained the words "critical race theory." Brookings also noted that these laws often extend beyond race to discussions of gender. Critics, such has Yale University professor Timothy D. Snyder, have called the state laws a memory law and a confirmation of the idea that racism is codified into the law of the United States, as well as arguing that banning educators from teaching about the nation's history regarding racism is a disservice to students.

Lawsuits have been filed in Oklahoma and New Hampshire against anti-critical race theory laws passed there, which claim the laws deprive teachers of free-speech and equal protection rights.

George Washington University Law School professor Catherine J. Ross posits that as several states move to limit their schools’ curriculum on subjects like race and LGBT issues, different federal appeals courts may reach contradictory decisions, which could lead to the Supreme Court choosing to take on the matter.

== Affected topics ==
=== LGBTQ topics ===
In 2022, Florida Governor Ron DeSantis signed the Florida Parental Rights in Education Act that would prohibit the discussion of LGBTQ topics from kindergarten to third grade. An expansion was proposed in 2023 by Republican state senator Clay Yarborough, prohibiting teaching about sexual orientation or gender identity from pre-kindergarten through the eighth grade. DeSantis has already made comments supporting the bill, signaling that if it passes the legislature, he will likely sign it. The bill has received widespread backlash from across the United States.

=== Left-wing politics ===
Several legislative bodies have sought to enact restrictions on how certain left-wing politics topics are taught. Socialism, Marxism, and communism are often the focus of proposed or enacted bills and are restricted in a way that allows their discussion in classrooms, but must be discussed as antithetical to the politics of the United States. In Arizona, a bill passed into law specifically listed totalitarianism alongside left-wing political philosophies.

== See also ==
- 1776 Commission
- 2020s critical race theory controversies
- Anti-LGBTQ curriculum laws in the United States
- Book banning in the United States (2021–present)
- Critical race theory
- The 1619 Project#Bans
- Sex education
