= Queer Liberation Library =

US-based LGBTQ+ digital library

- Type: Digital library
- Established: 2023

Collection
- Items collected: ebooks, digital audiobooks
- Size: 1,200 (2024)

Access and use
- Access requirements: Residency in United States
- Members: 50,000+ (2024)

Other information
- Website: www.queerliberationlibrary.org

The Queer Liberation Library (QLL, pronounced "quill") is an LGBT digital library based in the United States. QLL aims to provide resources representing LGBT communities in an online space that is accessible to anyone in the United States, especially those living in areas where physical access to LGBT books is limited. QLL is run by a steering committee composed of volunteers, led by founder Kieran Hickey. The library began fundraising in the summer of 2023 and launched the collection of LGBT ebooks and audiobooks on October 23, 2023.

== Book bans ==
The Queer Liberation Library is in part a response to the increasing number of book bans and challenges targeting LGBT materials in the United States. In 2022 the American Library Association, which has compiled data from book challenges reported to their Office for Intellectual Freedom since 1990, reported the greatest number of ban attempts to date, 38% more than in the prior year. Preliminary data from the first eight months of 2023 shows a 20% increase in challenges in the same reporting period of 2022. Book challenges in libraries and schools are key component of the 2020s anti-LGBT movement in the United States. Because QLL is available to users anywhere in the United States, it can provide access to the most frequently banned LGBT books, including in states with high numbers of bans like Florida, Texas, and Pennsylvania.

== Membership ==
Membership with QLL is open to any person with a mailing address within the United States, with no age restrictions. The Queer Liberation Library had over 50,000 patrons as of February 13, 2024.

== Collection ==
The library collection contains LGBT books including banned books, LGBT classics, and newly published fiction and nonfiction for children, youth, and adults. At the end of 2023 QLL had 557 books in the collection. As of June 2024, QLL's digital catalog has expanded to over 1,200 titles.

Users can access the Queer Liberation Library collection from desktop or mobile device through the Overdrive website or Libby app.

== See also ==
- Libraries and the LGBT community
