= Izzy and Moe =

1985 film by Jackie Cooper

- Genre: Comedy; Crime
- Written by: Robert Boris
- Directed by: Jackie Cooper
- Starring: Jackie Gleason; Art Carney
- Music by: Jackie Gleason
- Country of origin: United States
- Original language: English

Production
- Producer: Robert Halmi
- Cinematography: Peter Stein
- Editor: Eric Albertson
- Running time: 92 minutes
- Production company: Robert Halmi, Inc.

Original release
- Network: CBS
- Release: September 23, 1985

Izzy and Moe is a 1985 American made-for-television comedy-crime film starring Jackie Gleason and Art Carney. It is a fictional account of two actual Prohibition-era policemen, Izzy Einstein and Moe Smith, and their adventures in tracking down illegal bars and gangsters. The film was originally broadcast on CBS on September 23, 1985.

== Plot ==
During the Prohibition era of the 1920s, a gangster named John Vanderhoff, alias "The Dutchman" (based on real-life gangster Dutch Schultz) was killing off the competition and setting up his own speakeasys. To fight back, the Prohibition Bureau needed to get some extra men. Former vaudeville entertainer Izzy Einstein (Jackie Gleason) volunteers; he is desperate to have a steady paycheck to support his wife, mother-in-law, and four daughters. Einstein also wants to disprove his mother-in-law's claim that he is just a "bum".

When the agent in charge of the local Prohibition Unit office asks Izzy why he wants to sign on for a dangerous job, especially at his age, Einstein makes a speech: "This is America. And I'm proud to be an American..." The chief reluctantly hires Einstein when he makes a convincing argument that, unlike the trim agents in the unit, Izzy's regular guy status (and his various skills from vaudeville) can make him a good inside man for undercover work. In response to the chief's concern that he is still "too old" for the job, Izzy quickly suggests taking a partner. Moe Smith (Art Carney), Izzy's old vaudeville partner, recently had his underground bar raided by the police and is spending too much time alone and drinking. Einstein meets with Smith and asks for his help. Despite their testy friendship and Moe's similar concern that they are too old for that type of work, the idea of a steady paycheck convinces him.

When they first try to raid one of Dutch's bars, they find the gangster has converted it into a "reading hall". Izzy and Moe decide to use different tactics. After spotting a local baseball team, they ask their boss for 9 more men. They all dress as baseball players, and tell the gatekeeper at the bar they want to celebrate a win. They gain entry and enjoy it - then whip out their badges and arrest everyone in the bar.

Soon, Izzy and Moe have their own division within the unit; they work alone as a pair, get various costumes, and offer no explanations of their tactics. Izzy and Moe soon successfully raid underground bars all over the city, and arrest such high-profile people as the district attorney. After their boss threatens to fire them, Izzy and Moe meet the press, and Izzy gives his "This is America" speech. They are reinstated. After another high-profile arrest lands them in hot water, the chief orders them to do their next assignments by the book and with decorum. They respond by infiltrating a church disguised as an aging couple (with Moe in drag) getting married.

Moe, a widower, is attracted to Dallas Carter, an entertainer at one of the Dutchman's bars. He falls in love. Upset at losing so much money and booze to the cops, Dutch lures the pair to where a large shipment of bourbon is being kept. Izzy and Moe evade the trap, but Moe gets shot in the arm, and one of the agents is killed. The agent's death affects Moe, who had considered quitting again to be with Dallas, but he decides to stay, giving his own version of the "This is America" speech to reporters. Izzy and Moe then proceeded to rob the Dutch's big shipment of Bourbon that he was expecting, with help from Dallas, and also take the truck and its treasure to a police impound site.

Unbeknownst to Izzy and Moe, their boss, the unit chief, turns out to be on The Dutchman's payroll; it was his tips that helped The Dutchman stay one step ahead of the unit. After the chief tips The Dutchman about Dallas tipping off the shipment, Dutch takes her hostage and tells Izzy and Moe to bring the bourbon for an exchange. They go to his estate, dodging the bullets and capturing the corrupt police chief. When Moe confronts Dutch, the gangster is pointing a gun at Dallas' head. Moe offers himself; with Dutch about to shoot him, a gun blast knocks the gun away. Izzy emerges from hiding with a rifle. When Moe asks him, "How could you chance taking a shot like that?", Izzy, recalling a William Tell routine they had done in vaudeville responds, "I just pretended he had an apple on your head."

The movie ends with Izzy's mother-in-law lighting Izzy's cigar inside a store window display, with Izzy's family, Moe, and Dallas watching (a reference to a sarcastic promise she had frequently made to her son-in-law if he ever finally made something of himself.)

== Cast ==
- Jackie Gleason as Izzy Einstein
- Art Carney as Moe Smith
- Cynthia Harris as Dallas Carter
- Zohra Lampert as Esther Einstein
- Dick Latessa as Lieutenant Murphy
- Jesse Doran as "Dutch"
- Roy Brocksmith as Sheriff Bledsoe
- Tom Wiggin as Agent Normal Harris
- Rick Washburn as Jake
