= Breaking Away (TV series) =

American comedy-drama television series

- Genre: Comedy drama
- Created by: Steve Tesich
- Based on: Breaking Away
- Starring: Shaun Cassidy; Tom Wiggin; Thom Bray; Jackie Earle Haley; Barbara Barrie; Vincent Gardenia
- Composer: Lance Rubin
- Country of origin: United States
- Original language: English
- No. of seasons: 1
- No. of episodes: 8 (1 unaired)

Production
- Executive producer: Peter Yates
- Producer: Sam Manners
- Cinematography: Brianne Murphy
- Editors: Artie Mandelberg; Gene Ruggiero
- Running time: 1 hour (inc. commercials)
- Production company: 20th Century Fox Television

Original release
- Network: ABC
- Release: November 29, 1980 – January 10, 1981

Related
- Breaking Away

Breaking Away is a 1980 American comedy-drama television series. Based on the 1979 film of the same name, it was created by Steve Tesich, who wrote the original film, and the film's producer and director Peter Yates served as executive producer.

As a prequel, the series was set during the year prior to the events of the film. Shaun Cassidy took over the role of Dave Stohler (played by Dennis Christopher in the film), a young man crazy about bicycle racing and all things Italian. Barbara Barrie, Jackie Earle Haley, and John Ashton reprised their roles from the film. The television series was set in Bloomington, Indiana, but was actually shot in Athens, Georgia.

The series was caught up in the 1980 Screen Actors Guild strike and did not begin production until that fall. While heavily promoted by ABC, it was overlooked by TV audiences once it got onto the air and suffered low ratings. It was canceled after eight episodes were filmed though only seven episodes aired during its original run. ABC showed reruns of the series during the summer of 1981, and it was also rerun by A&E during 1985–1987.

== Cast ==
- Shaun Cassidy as Dave Stohler (portrayed by Dennis Christopher in the film)
- Tom Wiggin as Mike (portrayed by Dennis Quaid in the film)
- Thom Bray as Cyril (portrayed by Daniel Stern in the film)
- Jackie Earle Haley as Moocher (reprising his role in the film)
- Barbara Barrie as Evelyn Stohler, Dave's mother (reprising her role in the film)
- Vincent Gardenia as Raymond Stohler, Dave's father (portrayed by Paul Dooley in the film)

=== Recurring ===
- Dominique Dunne as Paulina Bornstein (episodes 2, 5, 6, & 8)
- Shelby Brammer as Nancy (episodes 1, 4, 5)
- Steve Doubet as Steve (episodes 2, 4)
- John Ashton as Roy, Mike's brother

== Episodes ==
Episode summaries

No.	Title	Directed by	Written by	Original release date	Prod. code
1	"The Cutters"	Joe Rubin	Steve Tesich	November 29, 1980	Z-902
The series opens one year before the film as Dave and his friends graduate high school.
2	"The American Dream"	Stan Lathan	Charles Rosin	December 6, 1980	Z-602
Dave audits a college class and meets Paulina, and a co-ed gets Mike to play in a football game for a fraternity.
3	"Knowing Her"	Kim Friedman	Jerry McNeely	December 13, 1980	Z-603
Cyril dates a co-ed, Moocher gets a job in a movie theater, and Evelyn takes a real-estate course.
4	"King of the Quarry"	Victor Lobl	Steve Pritzker	December 20, 1980	Z-601
Ray guest lectures at the university, and Moocher get a job offer in Chicago.
5	"Heart Like a Wheel"	Jack Bender	Caroline Elias	December 27, 1980	Z-604
Paulina meets Dave's parents over dinner, Moocher asks Nancy to move in together, and Mike drag races a college student.
6	"Rainy Night in Georgia"	Stan Lathan	Jerry McNeely & Charles Rosin	January 3, 1981	Z-605
Evelyn wants Ray to buy land near the university as an investment.
7	"La Strada"	Jeff Bleckner	Steve Tesich & Glenn Gordon Caron	January 10, 1981	Z-606
The guys get a painting job, and Dave's bicycle is stolen.
8	"Grand Illusion"	Ralph Rosenblum	Story by : John Steven Owen; Teleplay by : Glenn Gordon Caron	UNAIRED	Z-607
