= Democracy Forward =

American nonprofit organization

- Formation: Tax-exempt since June 2017; 9 years ago
- Tax ID no.: 820995286 a 501(c)4 821007988 a 501(c)3
- Headquarters: Washington, D.C.
- Region served: United States
- President and CEO: Skye Perryman
- Website: democracyforward.org

Democracy Forward is a nonprofit organization in Washington, D.C. Founded in the wake of the 2016 United States elections, it describes itself as "a national legal organization that advances democracy and social progress through litigation, policy and public education, and regulatory engagement." Skye Perryman has served as the president and CEO since 2021.

In 2025, the organization filed over 150 lawsuits against the second Trump administration.

== History ==
Notable examples of the group's work include Canoe Cruisers Association v. United States Coast Guard, VoteVets v. Department of Veterans Affairs, and City of Columbus v. Trump. On June 2, 2023, Democracy Forward launched a lawsuit on behalf of a coalition of Arkansas librarians, booksellers, and customers, which challenged parts of the Arkansas Act 372 that aimed to introduce criminal penalties for librarians and booksellers who provided materials deemed "harmful to minors". On December 23, 2024, a federal judge declared those sections unconstitutional. On January 27, 2025, the group provided lawyers for a group of Quaker congregations who opposed Donald Trump's rescinding of guidance prohibiting immigration raids in sensitive areas (including places of worship, schools and hospitals) without approval. The group filed lawsuits opposing a number of executive orders signed early in the second Trump administration, including those mostly shuttering USAID, offering a brief window for "deferred resignation" by federal employees, and freezing up to $3 trillion in federal spending. It also filed suit to restrict actions by Elon Musk's DOGE operation.

After Trump won a second term, he targeted big law firms that provided pro bono representation for appellate level and Supreme Court cases. Firms made deals with Trump to avoid punishment. In August 2025, Democracy Forward launched its own appellate practice of approximately a dozen lawyers.
