= Skye Perryman =

American lawyer (born 1983)

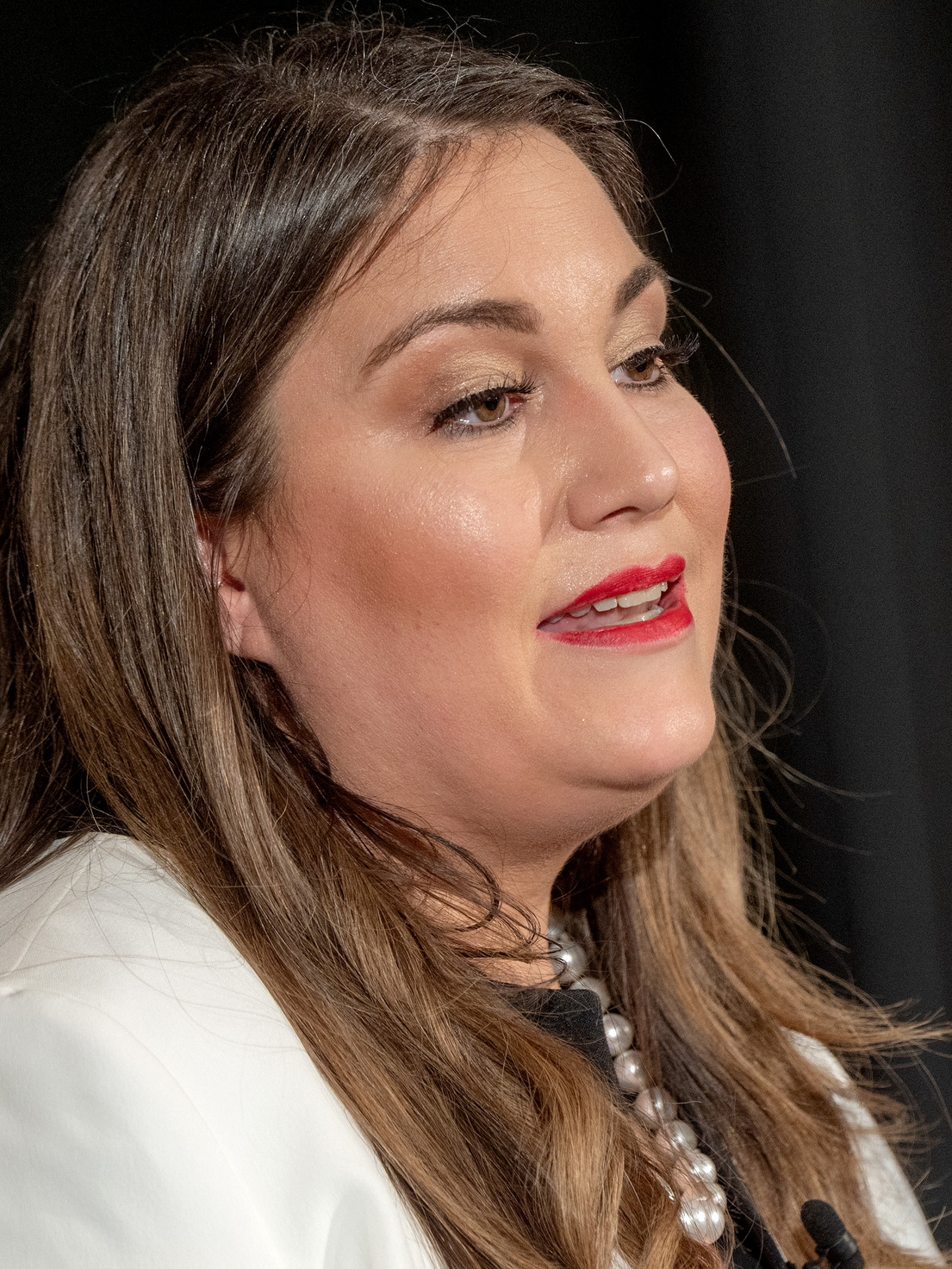
- Perryman in 2026
- Born: 1982 (age 43–44); Waco, Texas, United States
- Education: Baylor University (BA) Georgetown University (JD)
- Occupations: Lawyer; non-profit executive
- Organization(s): President and CEO of Democracy Forward

Skye Lynn Perryman (born 1982) is an American lawyer and nonprofit executive who has served as the president and CEO of Democracy Forward since 2021. She previously served as the chief legal officer of the American College of Obstetricians and Gynecologists from 2019 to 2021. She was named as one of the Time 100 in 2025.

== Career ==
Perryman was born and raised in Waco to a former Baylor University professor. Perryman attended Baylor, where she earned a Bachelors of Arts in economics and philosophy, magna cum laude, and participated in the Model UN and Project Democracy, before earning her Juris Doctor from the Georgetown University Law Center. She worked as a litigator at Covington & Burling and WilmerHale.

In 2018, she left WilmerHale to become a founding team member at Democracy Forward. A year later, she became chief legal officer at the American College of Obstetricians and Gynecologists. In this role, she fought for allowing Mifepristone to be sent by mail during COVID and for Medicaid funds for postpartum women.

She took on the position of president and CEO of Democracy Forward in 2021. The organization rose to national prominence in 2025, during the Second presidency of Donald Trump, for leading hundreds of cases against the administration. They organized Democracy 2025, a group that includes the Brennan Center for Justice, Public Citizen, and the National Immigration Law Center, among hundreds of other litigation organizations working together. She has become one of the most prominent litigators against the administration.

She wrote her first book, Ordinary People, Extraordinary Times, in 2026. The book is focused on collective action and encouraging people to start taking steps. In a September 2026 opinion piece for The New York Times, she reiterated her call for collective action.

She was named to the Time 100 in 2025, where her honoring article was written by Kelley Robinson, and was named the 2026 Woman Lawyer of the Year by the Women's Bar Association of the District of Columbia. She keynoted the 2025 Public Health Law Conference in Seattle. She was listed as a The Washington Post 50 in 2026.

== Personal life ==
Perryman grew up in Waco, Texas, and married her high school sweetheart. They have a son.
