= Iowa Senate File 496 =

2023 Iowa law

Senate File 496

Iowa Legislature
- Long title: A bill for an act relating to children and students, including establishing a parent's or guardian's right to make decisions affecting the parent's or guardian's child, authorizing the parent or guardian of a student enrolled in a school district to enroll the student in another attendance center within the same school district in certain specified circumstances, prohibiting instruction related to gender identity and sexual orientation in school districts, charter schools, and innovation zone schools in kindergarten through grade six, and modifying provisions related to student health screenings, school district library programs, the educational program provided to students enrolled in school districts, accredited nonpublic schools, and charter schools, other duties of school districts, accredited nonpublic schools, the department of education, the board of educational examiners, and the governing boards of charter schools and innovation zone schools, competent private instruction, and special education, and including effective date provisions.
- Territorial extent: Iowa
- Enacted by: Iowa Senate
- Enacted: April 19, 2023
- Enacted by: Iowa House of Representatives
- Enacted: April 20, 2023
- Signed by: Kim Reynolds
- Signed: May 26, 2023

Legislative history

Initiating chamber: Iowa Senate
- Introduced: March 2, 2023
- Third reading: April 19, 2023
- Voting summary: 34 voted for; 16 voted against

Revising chamber: Iowa House of Representatives
- Received from the Iowa Senate: March 23, 2023
- Third reading: April 20, 2023
- Voting summary: 57 voted for; 38 voted against; 5 absent

Final stages
- Finally passed both chambers: April 20, 2023

Summary
- Prohibits schools libraries providing books through grades K-12 that depict a "sex act," and prohibits schools from providing books or instruction through grade six that depict the topics of gender identity and sexual orientation.
- Status: Blocked

Iowa Senate File 496 (SF 496) is a 2023 law in the state of Iowa that prohibits schools from providing books that include or describe sex acts and prohibits the discussion of gender identity and sexual orientation in such books until sixth grade. Portions of the law were blocked via an injunction by a federal judge on March 25, 2025, and as of July 2025 litigation is still ongoing in Penguin Random House v. Robbins.

Senate File 496 is commonly referred to as a book ban and up to 3,400 books are known to have been restricted due to the law. The law also banned books such as 1984 and Ulysses, which was brought up by a judge when it was blocked again in March 2025 as being too broad.

== Provisions ==
Senate File 496 prohibits school libraries from providing books through grades K-12 that depict sex acts. A separate provision prohibits school libraries from providing books through grades K-6 that depict or give instruction to gender identity and sexual orientation.

== Reactions ==
=== Opposition ===
The ACLU of Iowa and Lambda Legal have both fought Senate File 496 in court. Iowa Safe Schools, the Iowa State Education Association, and Penguin Random House were also involved in litigation against the law. Around 170 school districts in Iowa, including Des Moines Public Schools, have not enforced the law.

== See also ==
- Book banning in the United States (2021–present)
- LGBTQ rights in Iowa
