= Tom Wiggin =

American actor, writer, director and producer (born 1955)

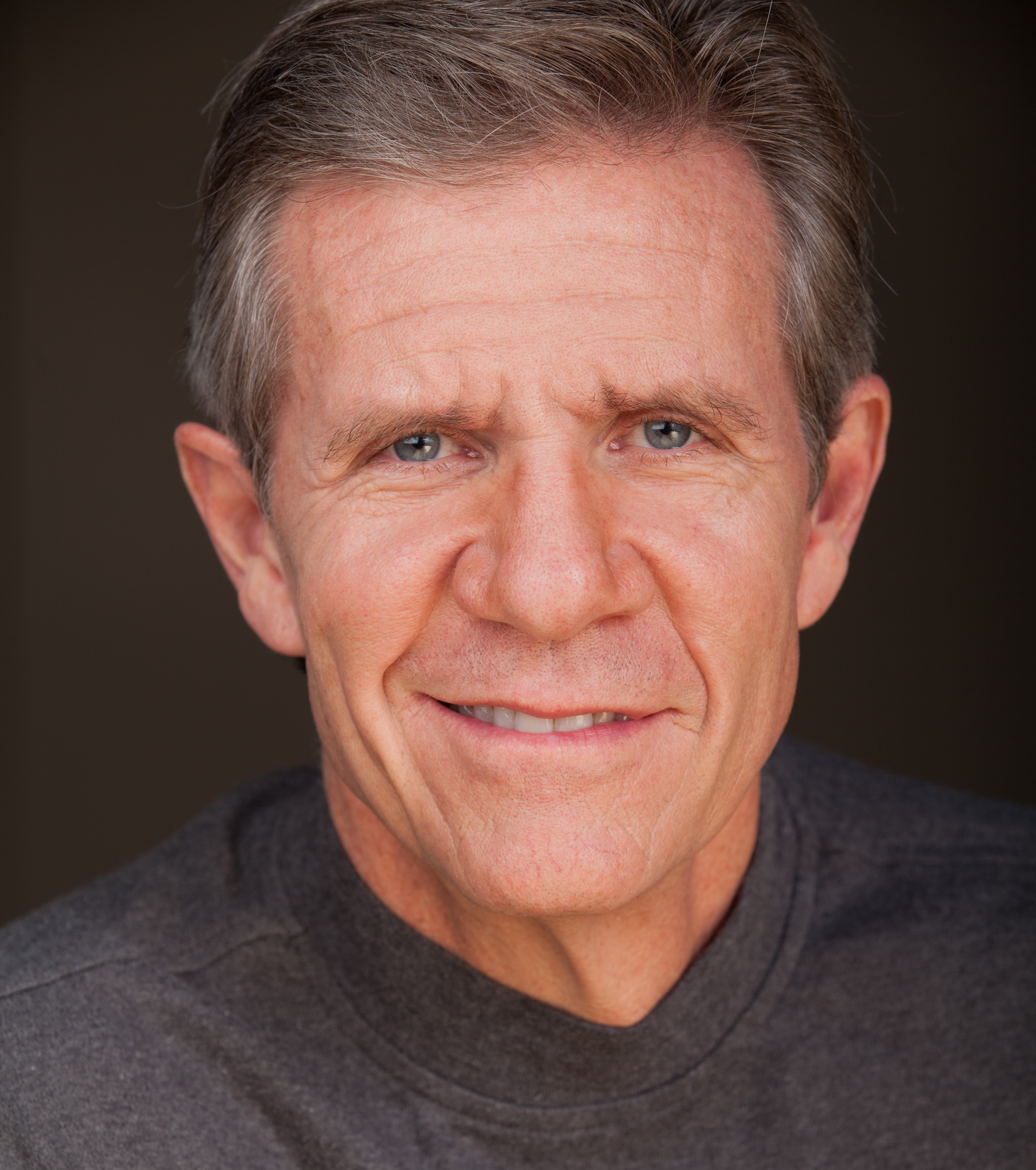
- Born: July 6, 1955 (age 70); New York City, New York, U.S.
- Occupations: Actor; writer; producer; director
- Spouses: Amy Forte (divorced); Jennifer Dumas (m. 2010)
- Children: 2

Tom Wiggin (born July 6, 1955) is an American actor, writer, producer and director. He is best known for creating the role of nefarious businessman Kirk Anderson on the long-running soap opera As the World Turns.

== Early life, family and education ==
Wiggin was born in New York City and raised in Alexandria, Virginia. He began acting in community theater at age eight.

He graduated from St. Paul's School in Concord, New Hampshire, where he continued to act while playing three varsity sports.

He attended Columbia University in New York for three semesters, then left to pursue his acting career.

== Career ==
Wiggin has acted professionally on stage, TV and in films. He has also written for two soap operas (Another World and As the World Turns) and had one screenplay optioned (Gift of the Robin's Nest).

Wiggin started his career in New York City. He landed the role of Danny Zuko in a national tour of Grease and eventually joined the Broadway cast. He left Grease to star in an Off Broadway production of the British play 'Class Enemy' during which he was cast as Mike, the ex-quarterback cutter, in the TV series Breaking Away. Wiggin went on to contract roles on two soap operas, Texas (Joe Foster) and Another World (Gil Fenton), acting with Morgan Freeman and Joe Morton. Between these two contracts, he joined the cast of the Broadway comedy Breakfast with Les and Bess. In the mid eighties, Wiggin joined the cast of the Off Broadway smash The Foreigner (Owen) and played Agent Foster in the TV movie Izzy and Moe, starring Jackie Gleason and Art Carney.

After moving to Los Angeles, Wiggin guest-starred in episodes of Hotel and St. Elsewhere, in addition to starring in the west coast premiere of the Australian play 'Down an Alley Filled with Cats' at the Pasadena Playhouse. He returned to New York in 1988 when he was cast in As the World Turns. He played Kirk Anderson for 10 years. In 1994 he appeared with Sam Waterston in the Lincoln Center production of Abe Lincoln in Illinois. Later he guest starred in an episode of Law & Order. He had non-contract roles on All My Children (Stan), and Guiding Light (Sam). He played Warden Whitakker in Iron Jawed Angels starring Hilary Swank, Whitey Ford in the mini series The Bronx Is Burning, starring John Turturro and he appeared again on Broadway, starring with Farrah Fawcett in Bobbi Boland, but the show closed in previews. He played Lawrence Decker, a non-contract role on Guiding Light shortly before it went dark.

He has appeared in several independent films, 'Exposure', Brother to Brother (starring Anthony Mackie) and Diggers, starring Paul Rudd and Maura Tierney.

In 2015 he guest starred on Person of Interest. In 2016, he appeared at Arena Stage in Washington, D.C., in "City of Conversation" and "All the Way" and he guest starred on "Madam Secretary" in 2017. In 2018 he returned to Arena Stage to play Robert McNamara in "The Great Society".

He currently lives in Charleston and makes filmed content at Atomic Focus Entertainment. In 2024 he co-directed a feature film on book bans called Banned Together.

== Awards and nominations ==
He has been nominated for two Soap Opera Digest awards. In 1990, he was nominated for Outstanding Comic Actor for As the World Turns. He was nominated again in 1996 for Outstanding Male Scene Stealer (for As the World Turns).

== Personal life ==
He and his first wife, Amy Forte Wiggin, are divorced. They have two daughters. He remarried in 2010 to Jennifer Dumas, a theater and film producer.

== Filmography ==
=== Film ===
Year	Title	Role	Notes
1979	Squeeze Play!	Third Base	
2004	Brother to Brother	Mr. Lewis	
2006	Diggers	Nick the Bartender	
2011	Trophy Kids	Mr. Pierce	
2012	Exposed	Senator Barksdale	
2017	Secrets	Phillip Gordon	

=== Television ===
Year	Title	Role	Notes
1980–1981	Breaking Away	Mike	8 episodes
1981	Texas	Joe Foster	78 episodes
1983–1984	Another World	Gil Fenton	31 episodes
1984	Izzy and Moe	Agent Norman Harris	Television film
1986	Hotel	Dr. Collins	Episode: "Restless Nights"
1987–1998	As the World Turns	Kirk Anderson	330 episodes
1988	St. Elsewhere	Frank Jude	Episode: "Their Town"
1998	Law & Order	Ross Sanders	Episode: "Bad Girl"
2001	All My Children	Stan Berringer	Episode #1.8045
2004	Iron Jawed Angels	Warden Whittaker	Television film
2007	The Bronx Is Burning	Whitey Ford	2 episodes
2008	Guiding Light	Lawrence Decker	19 episodes
2016	Person of Interest	Kent Turner	Episode: "A More Perfect Union"
2017	Madam Secretary	Ash Mackey	Episode: "Women Transform the World"
