= Banned Together =

- Directed by: Kate Way; Tom Wiggin
- Produced by: Tom Wiggin; Jennifer Dumas
- Starring: Isabella Troy Brazoban; Elizabeth Foster; Millie Bennett
- Release dates: October 2, 2024 (Florence, Massachusetts)
- Running time: 90 minutes
- Country: United States
- Language: English

Banned Together is a 2024 American documentary film directed by Kate Way and Tom Wiggin. It follows a group of high school students in Beaufort, South Carolina, who were fighting to reinstate 97 books which had been removed from their school libraries.

== Background ==
In October 2022, the Beaufort County School District removed 97 books from library shelves following challenges from a small group of community members. Most of the targeted novels were aimed at young adult readers and featured LGBTQ or BIPOC characters.

Three students—Isabella Troy Brazoban, Elizabeth Foster and Millie Bennett—utilized the Diversity Awareness Youth Literacy Organization (DAYLO) to organize student testimony and community rallies. DAYLO, originally a school-based book club, evolved under their leadership into a regional advocacy network. The group's efforts were credited with the eventual reinstatement of 91 of the 97 challenged titles.

Troy Brazoban has since spoken at national forums, including the American Library Association’s (ALA) "Rally for the Right to Read" in 2023, where she highlighted the role of libraries as "bridges" to understanding marginalized experiences.

== Production ==
The documentary was produced by Atomic Focus Entertainment, a production company owned by actor-director Tom Wiggin and his wife Jennifer Dumas. It was co-directed by Kate Way, an assistant professor at University of Massachusetts Lowell and herself a former high school teacher.

== See also ==
- Book banning in the United States (2021–present)
