= Idaho Commission for Libraries =

State agency in Idaho, United States

Agency overview
- Formed: 1901
- Jurisdiction: Government of Idaho
- Headquarters: 325 W State St, Boise, ID 83702
- Agency executive: Stephanie Bailey-White, State Librarian
- Website: https://libraries.idaho.gov/

The Idaho Commission for Libraries (ICFL), formerly the Idaho State Library, assists libraries in Idaho to build the capacity to better serve their clientele.

== History ==
Early in its statehood, stagecoaches delivered traveling libraries to Idaho settlements, mining camps, and outposts. The wooden boxes contained volumes for every age and every interest. The "Traveling Library," the precursor to the Idaho Commission for Libraries, was formed by the Columbian Club of Boise in 1899.

The 1901, Idaho Legislature created the State Library with an annual operating budget of $3,000. Charged with organizing new libraries and improving existing ones, Idaho took pride in its State Library services. The traveling library brought a civilizing and educational force to 51 settlements, including large towns like Boise, Moscow, and Pocatello and small ones like Preston, St. Anthony, and Salmon. By 1904, 100 communities were receiving books.

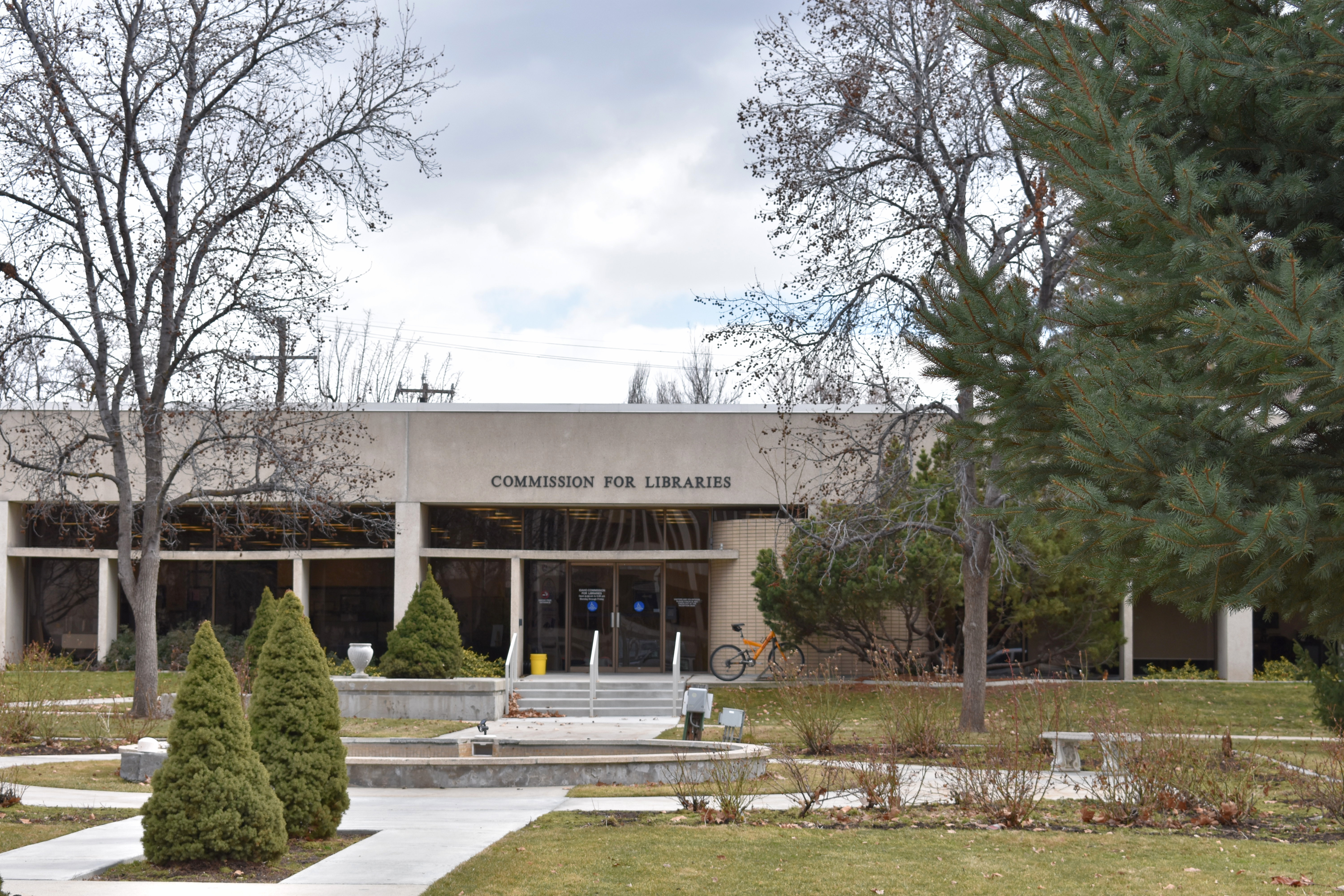
Idaho Commission for Libraries office in Boise, Idaho

By the 1920s, every major city in Idaho and many smaller communities boasted a library. Ten of those were built with Carnegie grants. These grants required local community support, much like private and federal library grants of today. The State Library continued to deposit collections of books throughout the state. In the 1930s, continuing education to improve local library services began and continues to be in demand.

In 1957, the Idaho Legislature more than doubled the State Library's budget, allowing the agency to receive federal grants under the Library Services Act. With these monies, local libraries demonstrated innovative services such as bookmobiles and children's story times. These early grants were the precursors of the Library Services and Technology Act funds administered by the Commission for Libraries in Idaho today.

After the Library Services Act was revamped in 1964, federal dollars also went toward library buildings. The final construction grant was awarded in 1998. In 1973, the Talking Book Library began to serve people whose disabilities made it difficult to use printed materials. Today, special machines and recorded books are sent statewide to provide recreational reading materials to thousands of patrons.

In the mid-seventies, the State Library ushered in computer technology by awarding library automation grants. That legacy continues today through the Libraries Linking Idaho Network (LiLI). The network hosts LiLI databases and a statewide resource sharing catalog, funded by state dollars. Plans for LiLI include the development of more statewide networking activities.

Effective July 1, 2006, the Idaho State Library changed its name to the Idaho Commission for Libraries and the board of trustees was renamed the Board of Library Commissioners.

== Programs ==
=== Libraries Linking Idaho (LiLI) ===
Libraries Linking Idaho (LiLI) is an alliance of libraries and library consortia working together on projects and services that bring networked library services to the citizens of Idaho.

In 1998, the Idaho Commission for Libraries contracted with Himmel & Wilson Consultants to conduct a feasibility study on creating a formal network of Idaho libraries. Upon implementing some of the recommendations, LiLI was born. An advisory board consisting of Idaho school, public and academic library leaders was put into place.

The first phase of the LiLI project was the development of the LiLI website to provide information about Idaho and Idaho libraries, provide links to information sources for Idaho citizens, and provide access to Idaho library home pages and online public access catalogs. The LiLI website, which was unveiled in October 1997, continues to be a central point of communication about LiLI programs and services.

=== Idaho Digital E-Book Alliance (IDEA) ===
The Idaho Digital E-Book Alliance is a statewide partnership between the Idaho Commission for public libraries, and school libraries with the goal of expanding access while reducing barriers to digital e-books and e-audio content via OverDrive.

Amidst the COVID-19 pandemic in 2020, the Idaho Commission for Libraries responded to growing need for electronic materials by creating a digital collection that is available across the state of Idaho. This collection is available to school districts and public libraries with existing OverDrive services, as well as to 280,000 Idahoans living outside of a public library access area.

== See also ==
- List of libraries in the United States
