= Canoe Cruisers Association =

US kayak and canoe club

The Canoe Cruisers Association of Greater Washington, D.C., founded in 1956, with over a thousand members in Maryland, Virginia, and the District of Columbia is a kayak and canoe club whose main purpose is to unite persons interested in paddling and whitewater kayaking in the Potomac River Basin and adjacent watersheds in Pennsylvania and West Virginia.

In addition to being the largest kayak and canoe club in the Washington, D.C., area, the Canoe Cruisers Association (CCA) provides support for the U.S. Olympic Whitewater Team. The CCA also works with local agencies such as the National Park Service to provide information, safe river paddling education and swiftwater rescue training to the general public.
