= Moon Palace Books =

Bookstore in Minneapolis, U.S.

Moon Palace Books is an independent bookstore in Minneapolis, Minnesota. Founded in 2012 by Angela and Jamie Schwesnedl it sells new and used books and, after having moving twice since its establishment, is currently located on Minnehaha Avenue near Lake Street.

== History ==
Angela and Jamie Schwesnedl established Moon Palace Books in the fall of 2012, originally in a smaller location. In 2016, the Schwesnedls, with a team of 60 people, moved 10,000 books to a larger location. The next year, in the summer of 2017, Moon Palace Books moved to its third and current location along Minnehaha Avenue and near Lake Street, a building with 3,300 square feet of space. It features the Geek Love Café, as well as a multipurpose venue for music performances and author readings.

Moon Palace Books is located near the Third Police Precinct in Minneapolis, Minnesota. During the George Floyd protests in Minneapolis–Saint Paul in 2020, the Schwesnedls showed support for protesters and turned down financial support, asking their customers to donate to the Floyd family instead. Ultimately, the bookstore was unscathed.

Through the COVID-19 pandemic, Moon Palace Books closed up their storefront and instead converted the building to a shipping center while providing a pickup option through a side window. Even after quarantine requirements were lifted, Minnesota Star Tribune reported that Moon Palace Books was one of the few local establishments left still enforcing a mask requirement in 2024.

Moon Palace Books regularly hosts a wide variety of events like book signings. Past authors and artists hosted include Oyinkan Braithwaite, Nana Kwame Adjei-Brenyah, Danez Smith, Charles Baxter, Sequoia Nagamatsu, Taiyon J. Coleman, Emma Törzs, Zach Goldberg, Shannon Gibney, and Northern Lights.mn. It has also hosted meetings for the Twin Cities Queer Book Club, provided free meals to houseless people during the COVID-19 pandemic, and partnered with Milkweed Editions to donate books to incarcerated people. Additionally, it's one of the few brick and mortar independent bookstores in the Twin Cities that sells zines and thus fosters the Twin Cities' decades-old zine culture.

The Schwesnedls have also mentored, assisted, and collaborated with other booksellers in the industry, such as Zsamé Morgan and her bookstore, Babycake's Book Stack, and Tropes & Trifles, a romance-only bookstore in the Twin Cities. Babycake's Book Stack also has a mobile bookstore which frequently partners with Moon Palace Books for Independent Bookstore Day on the last Saturday of each April.

Book Riot named Moon Palace Books in their list of the 35 best bookstores in the United States. Minnesota Daily included it in their list of the five best independent book stores near the University of Minnesota, Twin Cities.
