= Homosaurus =

LGBTQ+ focused controlled vocabulary

The Homosaurus logo

Homosaurus is a thesaurus or controlled vocabulary dedicated to LGBTQ+ terms. It aims to replace and complement outdated and disparaging definitions in broader vocabularies such as the Library of Congress Subject Headings, and has been used by the Library of Congress since 2016.

The project was started in 1982, where it was made as a standalone vocabulary to describe the collection for the IHLIA LGBT Heritage in Dutch. It was significantly expanded in 1987, and was merged with a queer-focused vocabulary from Anna Blaman Huis. In 1997, it was translated into English as A Queer Thesaurus, which was available in both Dutch and English. In 2013, it was renamed to the Homosaurus and expanded with a focus on reducing its bias towards white cisgender gay men. In 2016, it was decided to reduce the scope of the vocabulary to LGBTQ+ terms only. Since then, it has been used to support any use for collating LGBTQ+ works.

The thesaurus has been translated into Swedish and French. An effort to translate the project into Spanish was started in 2023 in collaboration with the San Francisco Public Library, UCLA Chicano Studies Research Center, and the Arizona Queer Archives when the U.S. National Endowment for the Humanities granted 350,000 dollars to do so. It is slated to finish in late 2026.
