= Arkansas Library Association =

Professional association for librarians in Arkansas

- Nickname: ArLA
- Formation: January 26, 1911; 115 years ago
- Tax ID no.: 71-0452619
- Headquarters: Little Rock, Arkansas
- Parent organization: American Library Association
- Website: arlib.org

The Arkansas Library Association (ArLA) is a professional organization for Arkansas's librarians and library workers. It is headquartered in Little Rock, Arkansas. It was founded on January 26, 1911, in Little Rock, Arkansas by Caroline Langworthy from the Carnegie library of Fort Smith, Maud Pugsley from the Little Rock Public Library and the Arkansas Federation of Women's Clubs. C. W. L. (Charles Webster Leverton) Armour, a trustee of Fort Smith Public Library, was the organization's first president. Early legislative efforts led to approval of a plan allowing some towns to impose taxes for library development.

== History ==
Miss Jim Parks Matthews, an assistant librarian at the University of Arkansas, was the first librarian and first woman to serve as ArLA president in 1923. During this time the organization moved towards advocacy for professional development for librarians.

ArLA began publishing a newsletter which evolved into Arkansas Libraries by 1930. After the organization had a financial setback in 1933 when their bank failed, Arkansas Libraries stopped being published until 1944. It is still being published quarterly in 2020.

== Arkansiana Award ==
The Association bestows The Arkansiana Award, given to the author(s) of a book or other work which represents a significant contribution to Arkansas heritage and culture on three categories: Adult Non-Fiction; Adult Fiction; and Juvenile Books. In 2021 the winners were: Marla Cantrell for Early Morning in the Land of Dreams (Adult Fiction); David Hill for The Vapors: A Southern Family, the New York Mob, and the Rise and Fall of Hot Springs (Adult Non-Fiction), and Darcy Pattison and Eileen Hutcheson for A Little Bit of Dinosaur (Juvenile).

== See also ==
- List of libraries in the United States
