= LPI Media =

American publishing company

- Type: Private company
- Industry: Publishing, periodicals
- Successor: Here Media
- Headquarters: Los Angeles, California, United States
- Key people: Judy Wieder, Corporate Executive Vice President & Editorial Director; Joe Landry, Vice President & Director Publishing; Stephen Murray, Director of Corporate Marketing; Jeff Lettiere, Director Circulation, The Advocate
- Products: Out; The Advocate; HIV Plus; Out Traveler; Alyson Books; Specialty Publications
- Revenue: ▲US$29.0 million (2005)

LPI Media (formerly Liberation Publications Inc.) was the largest gay and lesbian publisher in the United States. The company targeted LGBTQ communities and published such magazines, books, and websites, with its magazines alone having more than 8.2 million copies distributed each year. The Advocate and Out magazines were the two largest circulation LGBT magazines in the United States, each with corresponding websites, Advocate.com and OUT.com.

Additional publications included Out Traveler, HIV Plus, and LGBT-penned titles through Alyson Books making it the "largest publisher of gay and lesbian print publications" and thus the largest print voice of the LGBT communities, including transgender and to a lesser degree bisexual people.

They were also parent owners of Specialty Publications, which produces adult (pornographic) publications MEN, formerly Advocate Men, FreshMen, Unzipped, and [2]. Specialty Publications was one of the largest gay adult erotica web and video production companies in the world.

== History ==
Liberation Publications began with a police raid at the Black Cat bar in Los Angeles in 1966, prompting a handful of gay men to start a mimeographed sheet newsletter for the gay community. This grew into The Advocate magazine the following year and remained the only US LGBTQ magazine for nearly 25 years.

In February 2000, Liberation acquired Out Publishing Inc., which publishes Out and HIV Plus magazines. Then president and chief executive of Liberation, James Franklin, said the deal would "move the print properties into the electronic arena" and added that the Internet was popular with gay and lesbian readers because of "the closet factor."PlanetOut attempted in March 2000 to merge with LPI, but this was called off in March 2001.

Out Traveler, a magazine spin-off of Out, launched in 2003.

In November 2005, LPI merged with PlanetOut, which mainly has developed online properties to become the world's largest media company targeting LGBT communities. LPI's "solid accounts list of fashion, retail and consumer packaged goods advertisers" was cited among its strong selling points. Criticism of the merger centered on two aspects: that a consolidation of national media outlets of a minority community is unlikely to add diversity of voices; and that the publications were established and supported in an effort to secure human rights for gays and lesbians but now are instead delivering a market share to corporations.

In April 2008, press reports said that the magazines published by LPI as well as the porn magazines published by Specialty Publications were to be sold by PlanetOut to Regent Releasing, which owns here!, a cable television network catering to LGBT audiences. A SEC filing indicates that the agreement was completed in August 2008, with Here Media Inc. the new owner of LPI, Specialty Publications, and LPI's book company, Alyson Publications.

== HIV Plus ==
HIV Plus magazine is based in Los Angeles and was founded by Anne-Christine d'Adesky in 1998. Instead of subscriptions, the "national magazine [is] distributed at doctors' offices and organizations offering services for people with AIDS" including AIDS service organizations, HIV community-based groups, and physicians' offices as well as other qualifying groups and organizations. It offers "the latest stories on research, economics, and treatment". HIV Plus provides "news that raises awareness of HIV-related cultural and policy developments in the United States and throughout the world", including issues of "cultural stereotypes about incarceration, drug use, and HIV."

I was the AIDS and Health Editor at OUT Magazine for a couple of years, and I found that the scientific information I needed to report was getting increasingly complex. While there was a small group of long-time activists who had amassed a lot of technical expertise, the vast majority of my readers didn't have this background, and many of them needed to be making treatment decisions for themselves. So I started HIV Plus in 1998, to address this gap. During my tenure as editor, I tried to provide state-of-the-art science reporting that was accessible at different levels, so that anyone who cared could become engaged, and have some say in the ongoing dialogue. - Anne-Christine d'Adesky

Writers and contributors include contributing fitness editor Sam Jensen Page and columnist LeRoy Whitfield, whose "Native Tongue" column ran in HIV Plus magazine starting in May 2004 and was "one of the magazine's most popular features."

== Alyson Publications ==
Alyson Books is a publisher founded in Boston, Massachusetts by Sasha Alyson which specializes in feminist and LGBT fiction and nonfiction. Notable books and authors published by Alyson include the Dykes to Watch Out For cartoon series, by Alison Bechdel; Daddy's Roommate by Michael Willhoite; Melting Point, Doing it for Daddy, Macho Sluts, and Doc and Fluff by Patrick Califia; Young, Gay and Proud; Latter Days, a novelization by T. Fabris for the 2003 major motion picture of the same name; The Femme Mystique and Pillow Talk, edited by Lesléa Newman; Revolutionary Voices: A Multicultural Queer Youth Anthology; Love, Bourbon Street: Reflections of New Orleans, winner of the 2006 Lambda Literary Award for Anthology; Bi Any Other Name: Bisexual People Speak Out, edited by Loraine Hutchins and Lani Kaʻahumanu; and The Bisexual's Guide to the Universe, winner of the 2006 Lambda Literary Award for Bisexual category.

== Specialty Publications ==
LPI Media was the parent company of Specialty Publications, a publisher of adult gay erotic and pornographic publications. Their Men magazine (formerly Advocate Men) has been the top-selling gay male erotic magazine for over 25 years, and tends to portray men aged 25 to 40. Freshmen is an erotic magazine published monthly since 1991. It is geared toward gay and bisexual men. Freshmen has long been the best-seller in its genre and features top-line male porn models from Bel Ami, Falcon, and others; it specializes in young but not twinkish men, primarily 18 to 25 but some to age 30. Other items, such as calendars and playing cards, are also published using the same label.

"Freshman of the Year" contests are held, with many fledgling porn stars going on to greater success including Sebastian Bonnet, Roman Heart, Dick McKay, Zack Randall, Marcus Allen, and Billy Brandt.

Specialty Publications also produced Unzipped and [2], making it one of the largest gay adult erotica web and video production companies in the world.
