= Scott Sherman =

American novelist

- Born: c. 1962 (age 63–64)
- Education: New York University (MS)
- Occupations: Writer and podcaster
- Website: www.scottshermanonline.com

Scott Sherman is a U.S. writer and podcaster. His first novel, First You Fall, won the 2009 Lambda Literary Award for Best Gay Mystery. His writing has also appeared in many periodicals.

His podcasts include The Gay Parenting Show, Digital Photography Life and the four-time Podcast Awards nominated The Digital Photography Show. Sherman's photography has been published in Popular Photography magazine.

== Education ==
From 1976-1980, Sherman attended Edward R. Murrow High School in Brooklyn, NY. He graduated from New York University in 1985 with a Masters of Science in Counseling.

== Publishing career ==
Sherman has written for many publications, including The Washington Blade, Genre and Instinct. In the September 16, 2002, issue of Newsweek, Sherman's "If Our Son Is Happy What Else Matters" was selected for the prestigious "My Turn" column. For the impact of that article, which described a homophobic attack on his family, and other advocacy efforts, Sherman and his family won the 2004 "Families of Pride" award from the Family Pride Council (later, the Family Equality Council).

In June 2008, Alyson Books published Sherman's first novel, the romantic, humorous mystery First You Fall. The novel received positive reviews and was the winner of the 2009 Lambda Literary Award for Best Gay Mystery.

== Podcasting ==
Sherman's first podcast was The Gay Parenting Show, which ran from 2005-2007. The Gay Parenting Show featured personal commentary and interviews with experts in the field of gay parenting, including Dan Savage, author and activist Wayne Besen and Evan Wolfson of the Freedom to Marry Coalition.

Sherman's next podcast, The Digital Photography Show, ran on The Podcast Network from 2006 to 2008. The Digital Photography Show was hosted by Sherman and Michael Stein. The Digital Photography Show was a consistently top-rated show in iTunes and was nominated for two Podcast Awards in both 2007 and 2008.

In 2008, Sherman and Stein moved their show to Personal Life Media, where it was renamed Digital Photography Life. Guests on the show have included Scott Kelby, Rick Sammon and Nicholas Boothman.

After an on-again/off-again podcasting schedule, the Digital Photography Life podcast abruptly ended on September 21, 2009, with no explanation for the termination of the show.
