= Stux Gallery =

Fine art dealership in Manhattan, New York

Coordinates: 40.76327°N 73.97566°W

Stux Gallery is a contemporary fine art dealership located in Manhattan, New York City. Artists represented/exhibited by the gallery have included Doug and Mike Starn, Vik Muniz, Andres Serrano, Dennis Oppenheim, Elaine Sturtevant, Inka Essenhigh, and Orlan.

== History ==
=== Boston 1980–1988 ===
Stux Gallery was founded in 1980 in Boston, by Stefan Stux and his wife Linda Bayless Stux. Before opening the gallery, Stefan, who holds a Ph.D. in Immunology, had been teaching at Harvard Medical School, while Linda was a performance artist who taught math at Boston Latin School; a shared interest in contemporary art drew them into the gallery business.

The gallery opened on Newbury Street in December 1980, representing a group of artists from the Boston area, notably including Doug Anderson, Gerry Bergstein, Alex and Allison Grey, and Paul Laffoley, among others. It became a leader in what the Boston Globe called a "Boston art renaissance" in the early 1980s.

Doug and Mike Starn, who attended the School of the Museum of Fine Arts, met Stefan and Linda Stux at their graduation ceremony in May 1985, and received their first show at the gallery the following September. The success of their early work raised the gallery's profile beyond Boston, leading to the opening of a second location on Spring Street in the SoHo district of Manhattan. Both galleries continued to run simultaneously, until the Boston location was finally closed in 1988.

=== New York 1986–1993 ===
The gallery's presence in the New York art scene was secured when the Starn Twins were selected for the 1987 Whitney Biennial. The gallery developed a roster primarily composed of emerging artists, adding Lawrence Carroll, Vik Muniz, Holt Quentel, and Andres Serrano to their stable, giving each of these artists their first solo shows in New York. Fabian Marcaccio and Cary Leibowitz (a.k.a. Candy Ass) also received their first gallery exposure at Stux. In addition to these emerging artists, the gallery also hosted solo shows for senior artists such as Elaine Sturtevant and Gerhard Hoehme.

Stux began publishing catalogues for each of its artists’ shows, featuring essays by prominent art critics and historians, including Dan Cameron, Robert Pincus-Witten, Donald Kuspit, and others. It also engaged independent curators such as Collins & Milazzo and Christian Leigh to organize group exhibitions in its space, to develop a critical context for its artists.

In 1988, Stux entered into a collaboration with Leo Castelli Gallery for a dual exhibition of new work by the Starns.

When the international art market as a whole foundered in the early 1990s, the gallery ultimately closed its operations on Spring Street. After that closure in 1993, Stux engaged in lower-overhead private, secondary market dealing for several years.

=== Piss Christ controversy ===
In 1987, the gallery first exhibited Andres Serrano’s Piss Christ, which subsequently became the focus of major public controversy as a flash point in the “culture wars”, because it had been produced with partial support from a grant funded by the National Endowment for the Arts. The photograph—which features a plastic crucifix suspended in a plexiglass tank of the artist’s own urine—was cited for blasphemy by the fundamentalist American Family Association, and subsequently denounced in the U.S. Senate by Jesse Helms and Alphonse D’Amato.

=== New York 1996-2016 ===
In 1996, Stux reopened on 20th Street in Chelsea, Manhattan. There, the gallery continued to introduce more young talent such as Inka Essenhigh, and began to show internationally established artists such as Dennis Oppenheim, Mark Kostabi and Orlan, and mid-career artists including James Croak and Margaret Evangeline as well. In 2002, Andrea Schnabl joined the gallery as a new Partner and Director.

In 2004, the gallery moved once again into a larger ground-floor space at 530 W. 25th Street. Its roster of international artists has since expanded to include Nigerian sculptor Sokari Douglas Camp, CBE, photographer Ruud van Empel of the Netherlands, painter Thordis Adalsteinsdottir of Iceland, Iraqi photographer Halim Al Karim and Japanese photographer Manabu Yamanaka, multi-media conceptual German artists Gia Edzgveradze and Heide Hatry and leading contemporary Chinese artists Wei Dong and Zhang Xiaotao, among others.

In the Spring of 2014, Stux Gallery relocated uptown to the historic 57th Street district, renowned for the birth of early American modernism in fine art, occupying an expansive 4,000 sq. foot space on the 6th floor of the noted New York Gallery Building at 24 West 57th Street near Fifth Avenue, neighboring the Marian Goodman Gallery’s 3rd and 4th-floor domain. In 2016, Stux Gallery closed. In the summer of 2017, Stefan Stux opened Salon STUX West in a historic townhouse on Manhattan's Upper West Side.

Stux Gallery regularly participated in significant art fairs and collaborations with galleries and curators in the U.S. and abroad.
