= Velvetpark =

Lesbian and feminist website

- Website type: LGBT, arts, culture
- Available in: English
- Website: https://velvetparkmedia.com/
- Commercial: Commercial
- Registration: Optional
- Launched: 2007
- Current status: Online

Velvetpark: Dyke Culture in Bloom is a lesbian and feminist arts and culture American website that regularly features music, literature, theater, fine arts, film, television, and social activism as it impacts queer culture. Velvetpark also hosts a social network and dating community for lesbians and queer-identified women.

== Publication history ==
Headquartered in New York City, Velvetpark was launched nationally in 2002 as a print magazine by Grace Moon. In 2005, Moon hired former On Our Backs editor Diana Cage. By 2006, Velvetpark was read in nine countries, on five continents. In 2004, Velvetpark applied for the trademark including the by-line "dyke culture in bloom". The United States Patent and Trademark Office rejected the mark on the grounds that the word "dyke" was "immoral and scandalous". In 2005, Velvetpark amended its application, to have the USPTO recognize the word "dyke" as an accepted and welcomed signifier by the lesbian community. "Velvetpark, Dyke Culture in Bloom" trademark passed in April 2006.

In June 2007, Velvetpark produced its final print edition and became an online magazine, hosting text base and media rich content.

In 2009, Velvetpark launched "Velvetpark Mate", an interactive online dating site that marries social networking and custom-built dating features.

In 2010 Velvetpark found itself in the national spotlight when it became the home of the anonymous pieces of then-closeted West Point student Katie Miller, who became an LGBT leader in her own right and was featured on The Rachel Maddow Show.

In September 2011, Grace Moon transitioned to the role of publisher and handed the editorial reins to queer scholar Marcie Bianco. The two currently oversee the site's operations, with a collection of editorial and content contributors.

The site's annual "Top 25 Queer Women" list is renowned for highlighting overlooked LGBT women.
