= Diane Anderson-Minshall =

American journalist (born 1968)

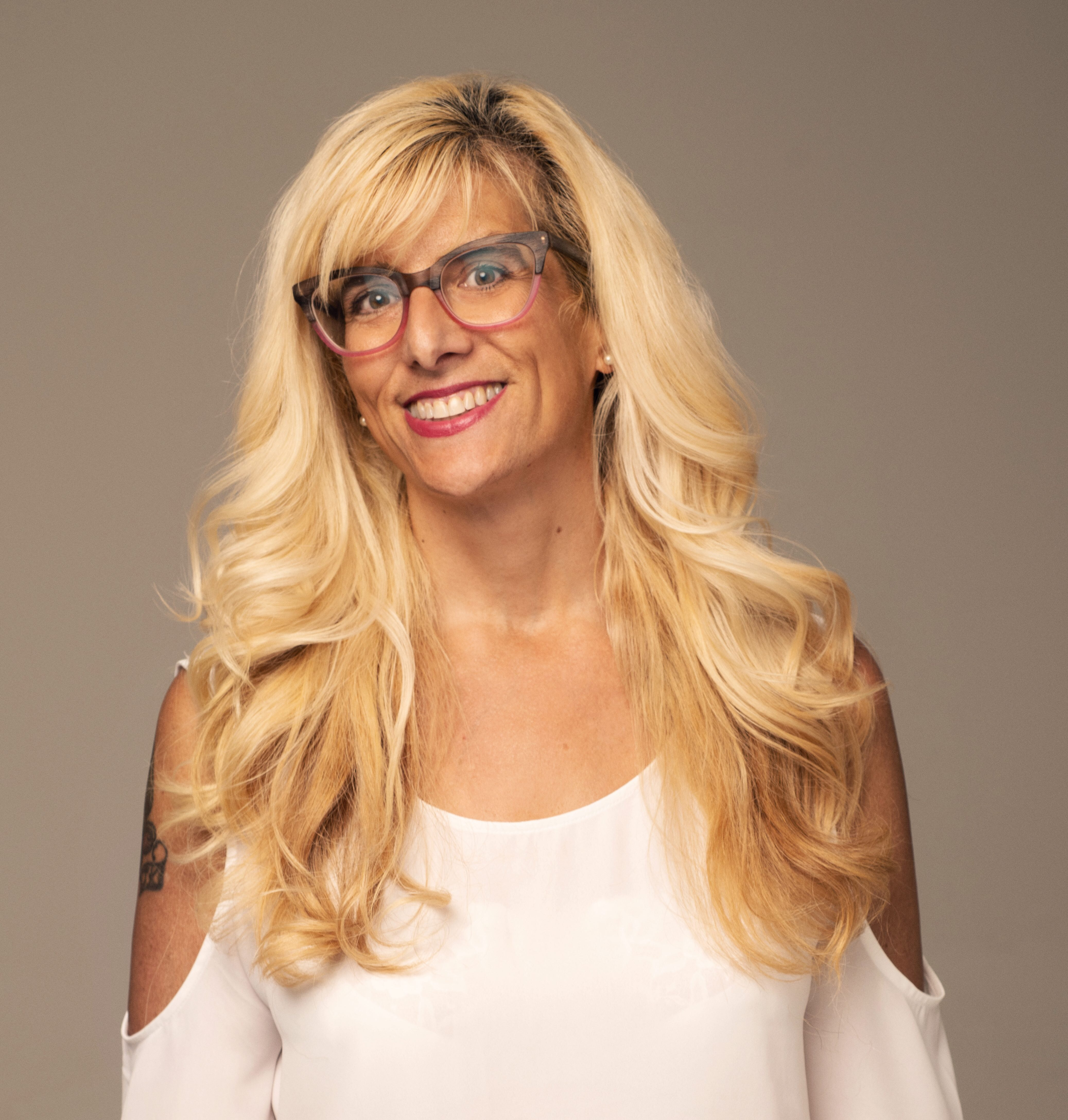
- Anderson-Minshall in 2018
- Born: Diane Anderson; March 18, 1968 (age 58); Southern California, U.S.
- Education: New College of California (BA)
- Occupations: Journalist, writer, editor
- Spouse: Jacob Anderson-Minshall (m. 2006)

Diane Anderson-Minshall (born March 19, 1968) is an American journalist and author best known for writing about lesbian, gay, bisexual, and transgender subjects. She was the first female CEO of Pride Media, publisher of The Advocate, Out, HIV Plus and other LGBTQ-focused magazines and websites. She also co-authored the award-winning 2014 memoir Queerly Beloved: A Love Story Across Genders, documenting her relationship with her husband Jacob Anderson-Minshall throughout his gender transition. As of August, 2025, she was Executive Director of GALECA: The Society of LGBTQ Entertainment Critics and its Dorian Awards.

== Early life ==
Diane Anderson was born in Southern California, and raised in Payette, Idaho from an early age. She studied mass communications and media at Tulane University and Xavier University of Louisiana in Louisiana before graduating with a B.A. in Communications and Humanities from the New College of California.

== Career ==
In 1990, Anderson-Minshall became the editor of the Crescent City Star, a weekly LGBT newspaper in New Orleans. In 1993, she was named editor at On Our Backs, the lesbian erotic magazine founded by Nan Kinney and Debbie Sundahl. A year later, she and fellow On Our Backs employees left the magazine and founded their own publication, the lesbian entertainment magazine Girlfriends. In 1999, she founded the short-lived feminist's lifestyle magazine, Alice.

Switching to freelance, Anderson-Minshall wrote for various magazines including Bust, Utne Reader and Seventeen. In 2004, she became an editor at Curve magazine, later rising to editor-in-chief. Along the way, she gained attention for several celebrity interviews in which the subject came out as lesbian or bisexual. Among them: Dana Plato, Angelina Jolie, and singer Sinéad O'Connor came out as lesbian or bisexual. Later in life, O'Connor said she didn't "believe in labels of any kind."

After holding various editor positions at Pride's Plus and sister publication The Advocate, and helping launch its Black gay lifestyle magazine Chill, Anderson-Minshall was named the company's first female CEO in 2020. The company added oversight of Out magazine and the website Pride.com to her portfolio.

Anderson-Minshall has also authored or edited several books. She co-edited the anthology of LGBTQ youth writing, Becoming: Young Ideas on Gender, Race and Sexuality (2004), and her autobiographical essays have appeared in several other anthologies. Beginning in 2007, she and her husband, Jacob Anderson-Minshall, collaborated on the Blind Eye Mystery series (Blind Curves, Blind Leap and the Lambda Literary Award finalist Blind Faith), following the cases of a San Francisco-based Japanese lesbian detective, through Bold Strokes Books. Her first solo fiction, Punishment with Kisses, a mystery involving the murder of a promiscuous lesbian, was released in 2009 by the same publisher.

Her 2014 memoir, Queerly Beloved: A Love Story Across Genders, co-authored with her husband Jacob, recounts how the two's relationship survived the transition from lesbian couple to husband and wife. In 2015, the Golden Crown Literary Society, which celebrates "excellence in sapphic and women-loving-women" stories, honored the couple with a Goldie award in the creative non-fiction category, making Jacob Anderson-Minshall the first openly transgender author to win an award from the organization.

Anderson-Minshall's advocacy has extended to raising awareness of various issues related to HIV and AIDS, including appearing in a 2015 segment of Larry King Now to bring attention to the high rate of HIV among transgender women. The same year, she oversaw the rebranding of Pride Media's HIV Plus magazine to simply Plus, with the new tagline "Because you're more than your status".

In August 2025, Anderson-Minshall was the first woman to be named Executive Director of GALECA: The Society of LGBTQ Entertainment Critics and the group's Dorian Awards for excellence in mainstream and LGBTQ-themed film, TV, and Broadway/Off-Broadway content.

== Personal life ==
After her partner Jacob transitioned from female to male, the couple held a second wedding ceremony in 2006 to celebrate their union this time as husband and wife. In 2011, the couple shared the story of their decades-long relationship with the NPR-affiliated program StoryCorps.

== Awards ==
- 2000 – Exceptional Women in Publishing (EWIP)'s Woman of the Year finalist
- 2006 – Power Up's Ten Amazing Gay Women in Showbiz Award
- 2009 – Lambda Literary Award for Lesbian Mystery finalist, Blind Faith
- 2010 – GLAAD Media Award for Outstanding Magazine Overall Coverage, The Advocate
- 2011 – GLAAD Media Award for Outstanding Magazine Overall Coverage, The Advocate
- 2012 – Excellence in Journalism Award from Northern California Chapter of the National Lesbian and Gay Journalists Association
- 2012 – GLAAD Media Award for Outstanding Magazine Overall Coverage, The Advocate
- 2012 – NLGJA Northern California Chapter Excellence in Journalism Aware
- 2013 – GLAAD Media Award for Outstanding Magazine Overall Coverage, The Advocate
- 2013 – LA Pride Osborn/Michaels Media Award, which "honors those who disseminate information to the public for the betterment of the LGBT community in order to raise awareness and fight for equality."
- 2013 – NLGJA Excellence in HIV/AIDS Coverage Award, Second Place: Diane Anderson-Minshall for a series in HIV Plus Magazine
- 2014 – The First Annual WPA Awards of Distinction Leadership Award for helping develop the HIV Plus Treatment Guide Mobile App.
- 2014 – NLGJA Los Angeles Chapter Overall Grand Prize for Excellence in Journalism for coverage of worst mass killing of LGBT people in U.S. History (prior to Orlando mass shooting)
- 2014 – LA Press Club SoCal Journalism Award for Best Online Feature "Remembering the Worst Mass Killing of LGBT People in U.S. History
- 2014 – Western Publishing Association Inaugural Maggie Leadership Award for creating the HIV Plus Treatment Guide mobile app
- 2015 – NLGJA Excellence in Online Journalism Award, Third Place: Sunnivie Brydum for "40 Under 40: Emerging Voices," The Advocate with Michelle Garcia, Lucas Grindley, Daniel Reynolds, Neal Broverman, Trudy Ring, Jase Peeples, Diane Anderson-Minshall, Parker Marie Molloy, Tracy E. Gilchrist, Annie Hollenbeck, and Thom Senzee
- 2016 – NLGJA Lisa Ben Award for Achievement in Features Coverage
- 2016 – NLGJA Excellence in Profile Writing Award, First Place: Advocate Staff for "40 Under 40: Intersectional Coverage," The Advocate
- 2016 – NLGJA Excellence in Social Media Award, First Place: Advocate Staff for "Day in LGBT America," The Advocate
- 2017 – NLGJA Excellence in Bisexual Coverage Award for "Freddie Mercury's Life Story is the Story of HIV, Bisexuality, and Queer Identity," The Advocate
- 2018 – NLGJA Sarah Pettit Memorial Award for the LGBTQ Journalist of the Year
- 2018 – Folio: Eddie and Ozzie Award for Best Editorial Team of the Year
- 2018 – Folio: Eddie and Ozzie Award for Best New Magazine Launch, Chill
- 2022 – GLAAD Media Awards, Best Magazine Overall, The Advocate 33rd GLAAD Awards

== Works ==
=== Fiction ===
- —— (2005). Blind Curves. New York: Bold Strokes Books. ISBN 9781933110721.
- —— (2006). Blind Leap. New York: Bold Strokes Books. ISBN 9781933110912.
- —— (2008). Blind Faith. Valley Falls, NY: Bold Strokes Books. ISBN 9781602820418.
- —— (2009). Punishment with Kisses. Valley Falls, NY: Bold Strokes Books. ISBN 9781602820814.

=== Nonfiction ===
- —— (2014). Queerly Beloved: A Love Story Across Gender. Valley Falls, NY: Bold Strokes Books. ISBN 9781626390621.

=== Anthologies ===
- Reading the L Word: Outing Contemporary Television
- Bitchfest: Ten Years of Cultural Criticism from the Pages of Bitch Magazine
- Body Outlaws
- Closer to Home: Bisexuality and Feminism
- Young Wives Tales: New Adventures in Love and Partnership
- 50 Ways to Support Lesbian and Gay Equality: The Complete Guide to Supporting Family, Friends, Neighbors or Yourself
- Tough Girls
