= Heide Hatry =

German painter

Heide Hatry (born 1965) is a New York City and Berlin based German neo-conceptual artist, curator, and editor. Her work, often either body-related or employing animal flesh and organs (cf: bio-art) or other discarded, disdained, or "taboo" materials, has aroused controversy and has been considered horrific, repulsive or sensationalist by some critics, while others have hailed her as an "imaginative provocateur", "a force of nature..., an artist and a humanist who is making a selfless contribution to life", and an artist whose works provoke a "reaction akin to having witnessed a murder".

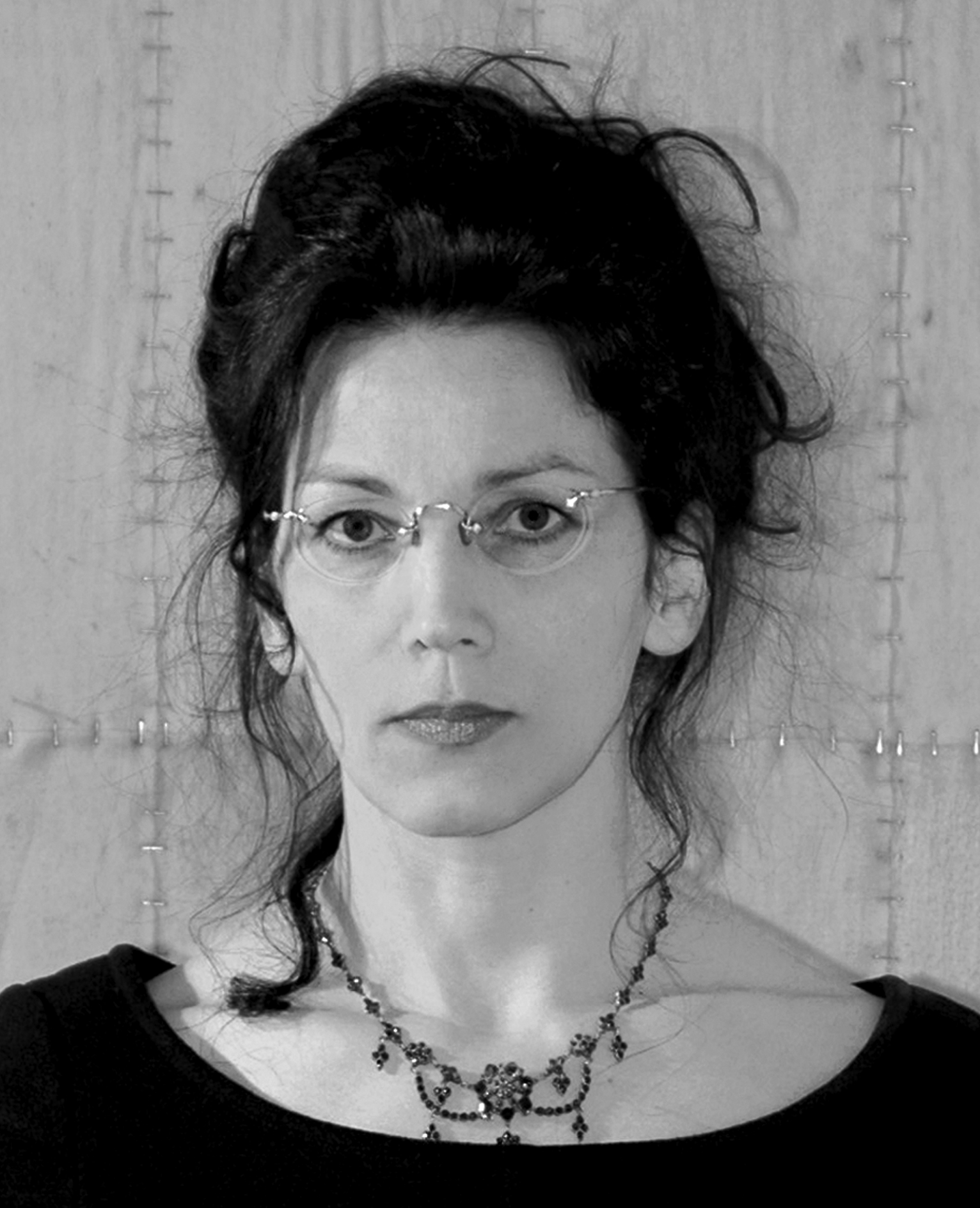
Heide Hatry, 2005

== Biography ==
Hatry grew up on a farm in the outskirts of Holzgerlingen. She left home at the age of 15 to enroll in a sports school. Later she studied painting, printing, typography, photography, and sculpture at various art schools including the Akademie der Bildenden Künste in Stuttgart and the Pädagogische Hochschule in Heidelberg, as well as art history at the University of Heidelberg. After many years teaching painting while co-founding and operating an antiquarian book shop in Heidelberg, she began her career as a visual artist in 2003 in New York.

== Art career ==
=== Skin ===
Her first solo show took place at Volume Gallery in Chelsea in October, 2004 and consisted of a diverse group of paintings, objects and unique books, with an emphasis on new work that would eventually become part of her book project entitled SKIN. In addition to being the documentation of several years of work with a highly eccentric art material, SKIN is a complex and thoroughly-conceived conceptual project in which Hatry plays on the fact that skin is the medium through which individual identity is most commonly received. The seven female artists all working with skin as a medium are in fact seven facets of Hatry herself. In the book, she fragments her own biography and accordingly distributes aspects of the work among seven distinct personae. Hatry prevailed upon nine art historians, critics, curators and thinkers (Susanna Partsch, Heinz-Norbert Jocks, Renée Vara, Michaël Amy, Elsbeth Sachs, Cornelia Koch, Christoph Zuschlag, Veronica Mundi and Hans Gercke) to participate in the project, maintaining the conceit and treating each of their subjects as unique, living, artists. Hatry created an artist portrait for each of her individual "selves" using prosthetics and make-up, in a manner akin to the work of Cindy Sherman.

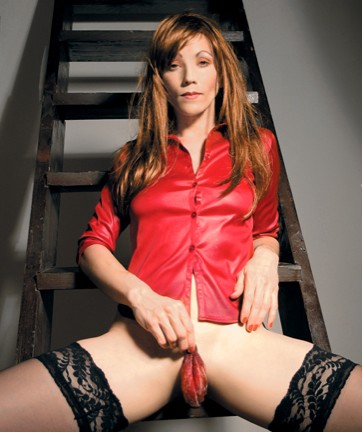
Betty Hirst, Photograph, 2005

At least one of these portraits has itself become a recognizable contemporary feminist icon (cf: Betty Hirst). During several events relating to the exhibition, Hatry or an actress she engaged, would play the role of one or more of her fictional selves. The book is characterized by mis-direction and deception of many sorts and on various levels, including reference to non-existent artists, books, and passages in (real) books, misquotation, illusory footnotes, false attribution, and pseudonymy, including dissembling gender identities, while nevertheless forwarding legitimate critical theses.

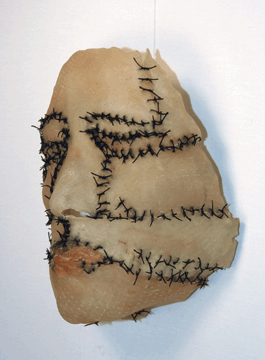
Mask, 2004. Preserved pigskin, meat and thread.

The art which SKIN documents is of a very diverse character, including sculptural objects, some of a realistic nature, some invoking comparison to African or Etruscan masks or statuary, two-dimensional abstract constructions, paintings in blood, and paintings treating art-historical subjects seen through a film of animal bladder or translucent animal skin, reminiscent of certain work by Doris Salcedo, and creating the impression of a heightened realism, a portrait actually "in the flesh". Hatry was the first artist to use untreated pigskin and other animal parts to create realistic depictions, chiefly sculptural, of the human visage, sometimes of a character suggestive of renaissance art. She has experimented with numerous preservation techniques, including the now-famous "plastination" method of the prominent pathologist, and impresario Gunther von Hagens, with whom she had been acquainted in Heidelberg.

The exhibition for which SKIN served as the putative catalogue, significantly avant la lettre, was mounted in numerous private and public venues in the United States and Europe, and Hatry’s “own” contribution, a performance in which she constructed a “skin room,” was documented by Cosmoto.

Her second large-scale project, Heads and Tales, was also documented in a book, published in English by Charta in 2009.

=== Heads and Tales ===
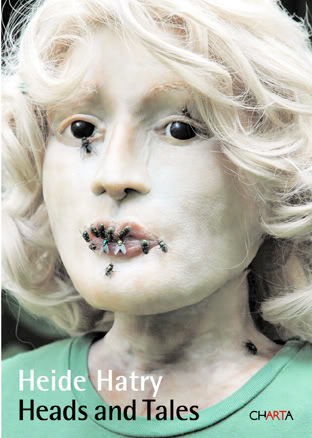
Cover of Heads and Tales, Charta, 2009

Heads and Tales is a collaborative endeavor between Hatry and twenty-seven female authors whom she invited to create "lives" for a series of sculptural busts of women. The often eerie or haunting visages were produced using untreated pig skin, flesh and body parts, and the original objects decayed shortly after their creation. Hatry documented the busts in the photographs, which illustrate the published book. The literary evocations of these women's lives treat a wide range of female experience, but frequently address the violence, abuse, suffering and subordination that Catharine MacKinnon describes in her introduction to the volume as the common lot of women: "Finding a way to be a woman is finding a way to live with fatal knowledge." Heads and Tales was exhibited in museums and commercial galleries in New York, Cambridge (US), Los Angeles, Madrid, Heidelberg, and Berlin. Hatry's collaborators in the project included Jennifer Belle, Mei-mei Berssenbrugge, Svetlana Boym, Rebecca Brown, Mary Caponegro, Thalia Field, Diana George, Thyrza Nichols Goodeve, Jessica Hagedorn, Elizabeth Hand, Katia Kapovich, Lydia Millet, Micaela Morrissette, Selah Saterstrom, Iris Smyles, Luisa Valenzuela, and Can Xue.

=== Not a Rose ===
Not a Rose, also a collaboration and documented in a book, was introduced by MoMA PS1, Strand Books, Barnes & Noble, McNally Jackson, and others. It addresses the meaning of flowers and animals to human beings. Masked as a traditional coffee table book, it quotes from the genre while turning it inside out, "subtly undermining our notion of the meaning of beauty". The images it offers are not innocent pretty flowers but elegant, compelling, and yet grotesque sculptures that the artist has created from the offal, sex organs, and other parts of animals, “pushing us into a realm where we question our relationship with beauty, animals, and dinner", the foundations of aesthetic reception in general and our use and abuse of nature. 100 prominent intellectuals, writers, and artists (such as Jonathan Ames, Stephen T. Asma, Bazon Brock, Steven Connor, Karen Duve, Jonathan Safran Foer, Anthony Haden-Guest, Donna Haraway, Siri Hustvedt, Thyrza Goodeve, Lucy Lippard, Richard Macksey, Kate Millett, Richard Milner, Hannah Monyer, Rick Moody, Avital Ronell, Stanley Rosen, Steven Pinker, Peter Singer, Justin E. H. Smith, Klaus Theweleit, Luisa Valenzuela, and Franz Wright...) address “the question of the flower” from a multiplicity of perspectives, including anthropology, philosophy, psychology, sociology, philology, botany, neuroscience, art history, gender studies, physics, and chemistry.

=== Icons in Ash ===
Hatry's Icons in Ash is a social, humanistic and aesthetic project that proposes a new way of seeing and honoring the dead. Hatry's Icons in Ash mosaics are completely hand-made realistic portraits created from human ashes inserted in beeswax. The project is accompanied by the book publication, Heide Hatry: Icons in Ash, published by Station Hill Press in 2017 in which twenty-seven contributing authors have offered a multiplicity of perspectives on the human relationship to death. The contributors include Michaël Amy, Hans Belting, Mark Dery, Thyrza Nichols Goodeve, Anthony Haden-Guest, Eleanor Heartney, Phoebe Hoban, Siri Hustvedt, Claudia Steinberg, Thomas W. Laqueur, Jonas Mekas, Lydia Millet, Rick Moody, Marc Pachter, Steven Pinker, George Quasha, Wolf Singer, Luisa Valenzuela, Adele Tutter, Peter Weibel, Linda Weintraub, and Naief Yehya. These cover a wide range of topics, from art history through anthropology, psychology, philosophy, semiotics, ecology, and beyond, as well as discussing death taboos, post-mortem practices, personal experience, the impact of the relic, and more.

Icons in Ash was launched at different locations including the New Museum, at the Deutsche Haus (NYU), the College Art Association of America (CAA) and exhibited at Ubu Gallery, the National Museum of Funeral History, and other venues.

In 2021 Hatry received the patent for a new technique to create Icons in Ash memorial portraits more affordably, and she subsequently expanded the scope of the project to include portraits of deceased pets as well.

Hatry contends and cites the experience of others who have commissioned the works as well, that the relationship to grieving, indeed to death, is altered by the “presence” that the portraits embody and that they exude a truth that is both “uncanny and consoling.”

=== Polar Bears ===
Hatry's most recent project consists of about 20 snow sculptures of polar bears. in February 2021. Accompanied by “explanatory” signs, such as: Let us chill, or, Mommy, what is a carbon footprint?, the light-hearted public project became a locus for family discussion of Climate Crisis as well as a spontaneous outdoor art tutorial for kids that attracted daily crowds and significant notice in the press.

=== Other projects ===
==== Oil Spill ====
The oil spill in the Gulf of Mexico in 2010 “inspired” Hatry to create artworks by collecting and preserving found roadkill, soaking them in oil and tar, and presenting them as sculptures and on canvas. Her solo exhibition at Pierre Menard Gallery in 2010 was followed by a benefit exhibition and auction which she organized with more than 80 participating artists to support the Audubon Society.

==== Rusty Dog Project and Rust Room ====
Hatry created 200 tiny rusty “balloon dogs” for use in Situationist-style performances, some of them “guerilla” stagings, that she enacted at several locations, including the Frieze Art Fair, NY and at public events during the Jeff Koons Retrospective at the Whitney Museum in 2014. The project was conceived to address the questions of value in art and the value of art and included sincere, if ostensibly provocative, discussion with random members of the art-viewing public at events whose purpose was otherwise merely social.

She also mounted her meditation on time and ephemerality entitled Rust Room, an installation that was constructed at Undercurrent Projects, NY, and consisted of an entire room in which everything, from floor to ceiling, was rusted, including table, chairs, shelves, books, bric-a-brac, and even the CD-player on which the Verdi Requiem was playing during the exhibition.

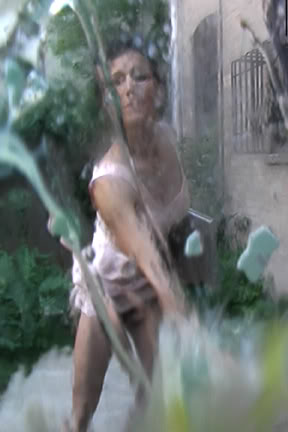
Video still from Expectations, 2007

==== Performance ====
Since 2004, Hatry also created a significant body of performance works, many documented in videos, including "Skin Room", which was performed in the Heidelberger Kunstverein, Germany; "Politics", which was performed on 9/11, 2007 in Central Park, New York, with a huge American flag made out of pigskin and spattered with blood; and her best-known performance-work, "Expectations", which has been presented at several venues including the Hudson Valley Center for Contemporary Art, Peekskill, NY; Brown University, Providence, RI; Studio Soto, Boston, MA; Kunstverein Nord, Berlin, Germany; and the 10th Barcelona Art Contemporari Festival, Barcelona, and at Catinca Tabacura Gallery in NY in 2017.

==== Curatorial ====
Hatry has frequently served as a curator. Her numerous solo and group exhibitions have included work by Carolee Schneemann, Tania Bruguera, Jana Sterbak, Zhang Huan, Kate Millett, Theresa Byrnes, Regina Jose Galindo, Minnette Vári, Larry Miller, Pat Steir, Richard Humann, Dove Bradshaw, Chrissy Conant, Peter Downsbrough, Max Gimblett, Chie Hasegawa, Kahn & Selesnick, Annette Lemieux, Aldo Tambellini, and many others...

==== Unique Artist’s Books ====
She has also edited many books and catalogues, and her own unique artist's books "treating texts by Paul Celan, Frederic Tuten, Friedrich Hölderlin, Johann Wolfgang Goethe, John Keats, Samuel Beckett, Walter Abish, Jorge Luis Borges", Franz Wright, Robert Kelly, and David Sedaris among others, are held in many private and public collections.

== Selection of Books and Catalogues ==
- HATRY, Heide: Icons in Ash. New York: Station Hill Press in association with Ubu Gallery, 2017.
- HATRY, Heide: Not a Rose. Milan/New York: Charta, 2012/13.
- HATRY, Heide (Ed.): One of a Kind, Unique Artist's Books, Pierre Menard Gallery, Cambridge, MA, 2011; Dalhousie Gallery, Halifax, Canada; Owens Art Gallery, Mount Allison University, Sackville, Canada; AC–Institute, New York, NY, 2nd ed., 2013.
- HATRY, Heide: Heads and Tales. New York/Milan: Charta, 2009.
- HATRY, Heide (Ed.): Meat After Meat Joy. New York/Cambridge, MA: Daneyal Mahmood Gallery/Pierre Menard Gallery, 2008.
- HATRY, Heide (Ed.): Carolee Schneemann. Cambridge, MA: Pierre Menard Gallery, 2007.
- HATRY, Heide: Skin. Heidelberg: Kehrer, 2005.

== See also ==
- Neo-conceptual art
- Video art
- Bio-art
- Performance art
- Body art
- Installation art
