= Boothman =

Boothman is a surname. Notable people with the surname include:

- Achille Boothman (1939–2018), Irish hurler
- George Boothman (1916–2003), Canadian ice hockey centrer
- Henry Boothman (1875–1953), British trade union leader
- Jack Boothman (1935–2016), 31st president of the Gaelic Athletic Association
- Jack Boothman (footballer), (1906–1989), Australian rules footballer
- John Boothman (1901–1957), Royal Air Force officer
- Mark Boothman (born 1977), Australian politician
- Melvin M. Boothman (1846–1904), U.S. Representative from Ohio
- Nicholas Boothman (born 1946), English author and speaker
- Peter Boothman (1943–2012), Australian jazz guitarist, composer and educator
