= Men (magazine) =

American pornographic magazine

- March 2007 issue cover of Men
- Categories: Gay pornography
- Founded: 1984; 42 years ago
- Final issue: 2009; 17 years ago
- Company: Liberation Publications; Specialty Publications; Unzipped Media
- Country: United States
- Based in: Los Angeles
- Language: English
- ISSN: 1097-3370

Men (formerly Advocate Men) was an American gay lifestyle and pornographic magazine published from 1984 to 2009. Established by Liberation Publications in Los Angeles, the magazine originally served as a sister publication to The Advocate. Its primary purpose was to provide a financial foundation for The Advocate's editorial operations through the marketing of adult products and erotic content.

Throughout its tenure, the publication gained a significant following for its erotic fiction, video reviews, and professional photography featuring adult film stars, notably establishing its annual Man of the Year honor in 1998. In 2008, the brand underwent a major restructuring under Unzipped Media following its acquisition by Regent Media. In September 2009, the publisher announced the cessation of monthly print issues in favor of a quarterly digital-first model. The publication was ultimately discontinued.

== History ==
=== 1984–2007: Liberation Publications and brand expansion ===
Launched in June 1984 by Liberation Publications, Advocate Men was a sister publication to the news monthly The Advocate. Based in Los Angeles, the magazine gained popularity through erotic fiction, video reviews, and professional photography of adult film stars. John Knoebel, the marketing director of The Advocate, served as the magazine's publisher. Advocate Men was designed to market adult products to provide a financial foundation that could support the operations of The Advocate. "We cut all that lifestyle stuff and had a total focus on sex", said Knoebel. Although The Advocate relied heavily on revenue from personal and phone sex advertisements, it maintained a strict editorial policy against graphic nudity. Advocate Men shifted its aesthetic toward a youthful, fit, less hairy male body type to create a remote sexual appeal. This served as a deliberate visual distraction from the physical devastation of the AIDS epidemic.

In 1992, under a new editor and publisher, The Advocate underwent a redesign and moved its sexually explicit content to sister publications like Advocate Men. During this period, former Advocate cartoonist Gerard Donelan contributed erotic comics to the magazine. Starting with the October 1997 issue, it changed its name to simply Men. The January 1998 issue introduced the magazine's first annual Man of the Year issue, an honor determined by subscriber votes. The inaugural title was awarded to adult film star Scott Styles. To expand its digital presence, the Men CyberClub launched in 2000 as a paid subscription service. The online platform mirrored the print magazine's content, featuring erotic fiction, video reviews, advice columns, chat rooms, and message boards. Under the Specialty Publications umbrella, Men was grouped alongside sister titles Freshmen and Unzipped.

=== 2008–2009: Digital shift and cessation of publication ===
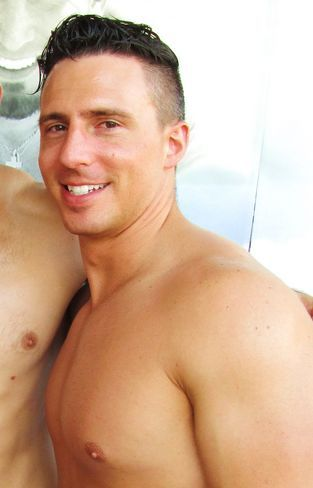
The January 2009 issue, featuring Reese Rideout (pictured in 2015), became the magazine's best-selling release since 2007

In 2008, following the acquisition of the brands from PlanetOut Inc. by parent company Regent Media, Specialty Publications was rebranded and relaunched as Unzipped Media. The following year, Unzipped Media expanded its physical distribution, placing its titles on more than 350 newsstands nationwide, including Waldenbooks. This expansion saw a commercial success with the January 2009 issue of Men. Featuring pornographic actor Reese Rideout as Man of the Year, the issue became the magazine's best-selling release at Barnes & Noble in two years. It achieved a 45% sell-through rate, marking the publication's highest sales performance since March 2007. AVN attributed its success to Rideout's mainstream popularity.

In September 2009, it was announced that Men and Freshmen would cease monthly publication and transition to a quarterly newsstand frequency, shifting primary focus to their digital presence. Existing subscribers to either title were transitioned to Unzipped. The magazines were merged into Unzipped.net, a platform intended to prioritize new media content. Executive editor Rick Andreoli noted that the move was driven by the growth in site traffic. However, Queerty reported that half of Unzipped Media's staff had been laid off due to the industry-wide shift toward online porn consumption, while Fleshbot reported the magazines' offices would close by the end of September.

Despite plans for a special edition of Men to be published later in 2009, the issue never materialized. Unzipped.net eventually went offline, and no further issues of the magazines have been released since the transition. To commemorate the brand's 25-year legacy, Alyson Books published a 25th Anniversary Special hardcover book in November 2009.

== Sister publications ==
Freshmen magazine cover, April 1997 issue

To sustain The Advocate during the financially devastating years of the AIDS epidemic, Knoebel created several erotic-focused magazines and established a reliable profit source, besides Men. In October 1985, Knoebel published Men of Advocate Men, a magazine dedicated to model listings. Four years later, the title was renamed Male Pictorial.

Freshmen was founded in 1991 as a spin-off of Men, focused on younger models while maintaining a similar editorial format to its predecessor. A cornerstone of the publication was its annual contest, where subscribers voted for their favorite Freshman of the Year. Pornographic actor Zack Randall won the title twice, in 2007 and 2009. In August 2006, the magazine celebrated with a special 15th-anniversary commemorative issue. Beyond the photography, its erotic fiction was compiled into two anthologies published by Alyson Books in 1996 and 2005. The December 2008 issue marked a sales resurgence, achieving its best performance since June 2007. This momentum continued into the January 2009 issue, with a 45% sell-through rate, the publication's highest in over two years. In September 2009, Men and Freshmen ceased monthly publication and merged into Unzipped.net.

In 1992, Advocate Classifieds was launched as a standalone publication to house the sexually oriented advertisements that had previously been a staple of The Advocate. This move aimed to make The Advocate more attractive to mainstream advertisers, who were often deterred by the explicit nature of the classifieds. To maintain reader interest, Advocate Classifieds included editorial content like advice columns and horoscopes. In September 1997, the publication was rebranded as Unzipped magazine. By 2008, it was grouped with Freshmen and Men under the Unzipped Media banner. In 2009, these titles were incorporated into Unzipped.net, a blog featuring news and pop culture content. The October 2008 issue of Unzipped, featuring Johnny Hazzard, outsold any issue from the previous two years. In August 2009, the magazine made history by featuring comedienne Margaret Cho on the cover, marking the first time a woman and a mainstream celebrity fronted the publication. Although Unzipped was briefly available in both print and online formats, the brand ceased all operations in March 2010, resulting in the layoff of most of its staff.

== See also ==
- List of gay pornographic magazines
