= Michael Willhoite =

American artist & writer (born 1946)

- Born: July 3, 1946 (age 80); Hobart, Oklahoma
- Known for: Artist and writer
- Notable work: Daddy's Roommate, Daddy's Wedding, Members of the Tribe, Willhoite's Hollywood
- Awards: Lambda Literary Award

Michael Willhoite is an artist and writer who is best known for his children's books depicting families with gay parents. His book Daddy's Roommate (1990) was the second most challenged book in American libraries in the decade of 1990–1999, according to the American Library Association.

Willhoite was born July 3, 1946, in Hobart, Oklahoma. He was raised in part by an aunt, in a household where books were widely read and discussed. From an early age he also developed an interest in movies, and in art. He remarked later, "Very early in life, I showed signs of becoming an artist; indeed, it was always expected that I should become one." In high school, he took a particular interest in caricatures.

In the 1980s he drew a bi-weekly series of caricatures for the Washington Blade, a gay newspaper in the nation's capital, depicting notable gay men and lesbians in history. Many of them were collected and published by Alyson Publications in two books: Members of the Tribe (1993) and Willhoite's Hollywood (1994). That company also published Now for My Next Trick (1986), a book of his cartoons from the Washington Blade.

Willhoite began work on his best-known book in 1990, when his publisher, Sasha Alyson, started a new line of children's books, Alyson Wonderland, to depict families with gay and lesbian parents. Alyson invited Willhoite to submit a book. After some thought about how to present such content, Willhoite produced Daddy's Roommate. It was the first children's book to feature two gay men as parents.

The book soon became a subject of heated controversy. It was one of many titles included in a reading list for New York City's "Children of the Rainbow" curriculum, where it was widely attacked. Because of good reviews in Publishers Weekly and School Library Journal, many libraries purchased the book for their collections, and it often faced challenges from library users who objected to it. The American Library Association reported that it was the most challenged book in the country in 1993 and 1994.

Willhoite followed this with Daddy's Wedding (1996). Willhoite won a Lambda Literary Award in 1991 for Daddy's Roommate (Small Press Award). His novel The Venetian Boy appeared in 2011. His novel The Goddess of Destruction appeared in 2014. In 2021 Willhoite published another children's book, Calvin and the Girls, a story about a shy young dairy farmer, timid around women, and whose cows help him find a wife. It is published in a format that children with dyslexia can easily read.
