= Thyrza Nichols Goodeve =

American art historian

Thyrza Nichols Goodeve is a writer, interviewer, artist, and teacher active in the field of contemporary art and culture.

== Biography ==
Goodeve was born in Middlebury, Connecticut, where she lived until her family moved to Windham, Vermont. Her brother is actor Grant Goodeve. Her maternal great-great-grandfather was the Vermont politician and Union Army Colonel William T. Nichols, while her paternal great-great-grandfather was Orvil (sometimes spelled Orville) Grant, a younger brother of U.S. President Ulysses S. Grant. She attended the Westover School in Middlebury, Connecticut and Northfield Mount Hermon School (NMH) in Massachusetts. In 1975, through NMH, she attended the American School of Tangier where she met Paul Bowles and Mohammed Mrabet, key influences on her career as a writer. She received a B.A. from Sarah Lawrence College (creative writing, film, philosophy), an M.A. from New York University (cinema studies), and a Ph.D. from the University of California, Santa Cruz under Donna Haraway and James Clifford. She lives in Brooklyn Heights, New York.

== Writing and performance ==
Goodeve is known both as an essayist and as an interviewer. She writes on diverse topics ranging from vaudeville to cyborgs to the art of doodling, and she has published in such respected periodicals as Artforum, Parkett, Art in America, Artbyte, The Guggenheim Magazine, The Village Voice, The Brooklyn Rail, Art Agenda, and Camerawork. From 2017 to 2019 she was the Senior Art Editor of The Brooklyn Rail, following which she became an Editor-at-Large. She has interviewed Matthew Barney, Yvonne Rainer, Ellen Gallagher, the Brothers Quay, McKenzie Wark, Tim Rollins and K.O.S., Aziz + Cucher, and Carolee Schneemann. Her book-length conversation with the influential science and technology scholar Donna Haraway offers a wide-ranging and intimate introduction to Haraway's challenging work. Among other things, she argues that science fiction offers a model for Haraway's imaginative theorizations.

Goodeve has also written on Jeff Koons, Raymond Pettibon, Tony Oursler, Michael Joaquin Grey, Matthew Ritchie, Joseph Nechvatal, Heide Hatry, Eve Andrée Laramée, and Lesley Dill.

As a performer, Goodeve has appeared in works by Yvonne Rainer, Joseph Nechvatal, Bradley Rubenstein, and Ellen Harvey. She appears as the graduate student in Yvonne Rainer's 1985 film The Man Who Envied Women.

== Teaching ==
From 1995 to 1997, Goodeve worked as a research associate at the Whitney Museum of American Art on the American Century Exhibition. From 1998 to 1999, she was Senior Instructor at the Whitney Independent Studio Program. Since 1999, she has been on the faculty of the School of Visual Arts, teaching in the M.F.A. programs in Art Criticism and Writing; Art Practice; and Computer Art. She has also taught in SVA's undergraduate art history and film programs.

Outside of New York, Goodeve has taught at the Rhode Island School of Design and is the program coordinator for the Maryland Institute College of Art summer intensive program in New York City.

== Publications ==
Books

- How Like a Leaf: A Conversation with Donna Haraway. New York: Routledge, 1999.
- Ellen Gallagher. London: Anthony d’Offay, 1999. (Exhibition catalog).
- Cremaster 5. New York: Barbara Gladstone Gallery, 1997. (Exhibition catalog).

Selected essays and interviews

- "Matthew Barney 95: Suspension [Cremaster], Secretion [pearl], Secret [biology]", Parkett 45, 1995, pp. 67–69.
- "Cady Noland: Vaudville as Encyclopedia, History as Vaudeville." Parkett 46, 1996, pp. 92–96.
- "Dream Team: Thyrza Nichols Goodeve Talks with the Brothers Quay", Artforum 84, 1996. (Interview).
- "Houdini’s Premonition: Virtuality and Vaudeville on the Internet", Leonardo, October/November 1997.
- "Rainer Talking Pictures". In A Woman Who, Johns Hopkins University Press, 1999. (Interview with Yvonne Rainer).
- "These Are the Forms That We Live With", Azizcucher.net, 1999. (Interview with Aziz + Cucher).
- "Richard Serra and the Brain: A Form Not Seen Before". Journal of Neuro-Aesthetic Theory 1, 1997-99.
- “Surrealism and the Cyborg”, ArtLab 1, Spring 2003.
- "Mythic Creatures: Dragons, Unicorns, and Mermaids", The Brooklyn Rail, Summer 2007.
- "Two Days in the Lives of Art as Social Action: Shakespeare, Darwin, and Hanging Out with Tim Rollins and K.O.S." The Brooklyn Rail, Dec. 18, 2013.
- "Jean-Luc Mylayne's 'Chaos'". Art Agenda, Nov. 5, 2014.
- "The Cat is My Medium: The Art and Writing of Carolee Schneemann", Art Journal, Spring 2015.
- "Andrea Fraser with Thyrza Nichols Goodeve". The Brooklyn Rail, April 6, 2016.
- "'What Forms of Making Might Spin the Stories We Need to Lift Ourselves from the Distractions of the Immediate?': Ann Hamilton with Thyrza Goodeve". The Brooklyn Rail, Feb. 1, 2017.
