= On Our Backs =

Women-run erotica magazine

- Spring 1985 cover of On Our Backs
- Editor: Susie Bright (1985–1990), Tristan Taormino (1998-2002)
- Categories: Human sexuality, Lesbian
- Publisher: Blush Productions
- Founded: 1984
- Final issue: 2006
- Country: United States
- Based in: San Francisco, California
- ISSN: 0890-2224
- OCLC: 14191920

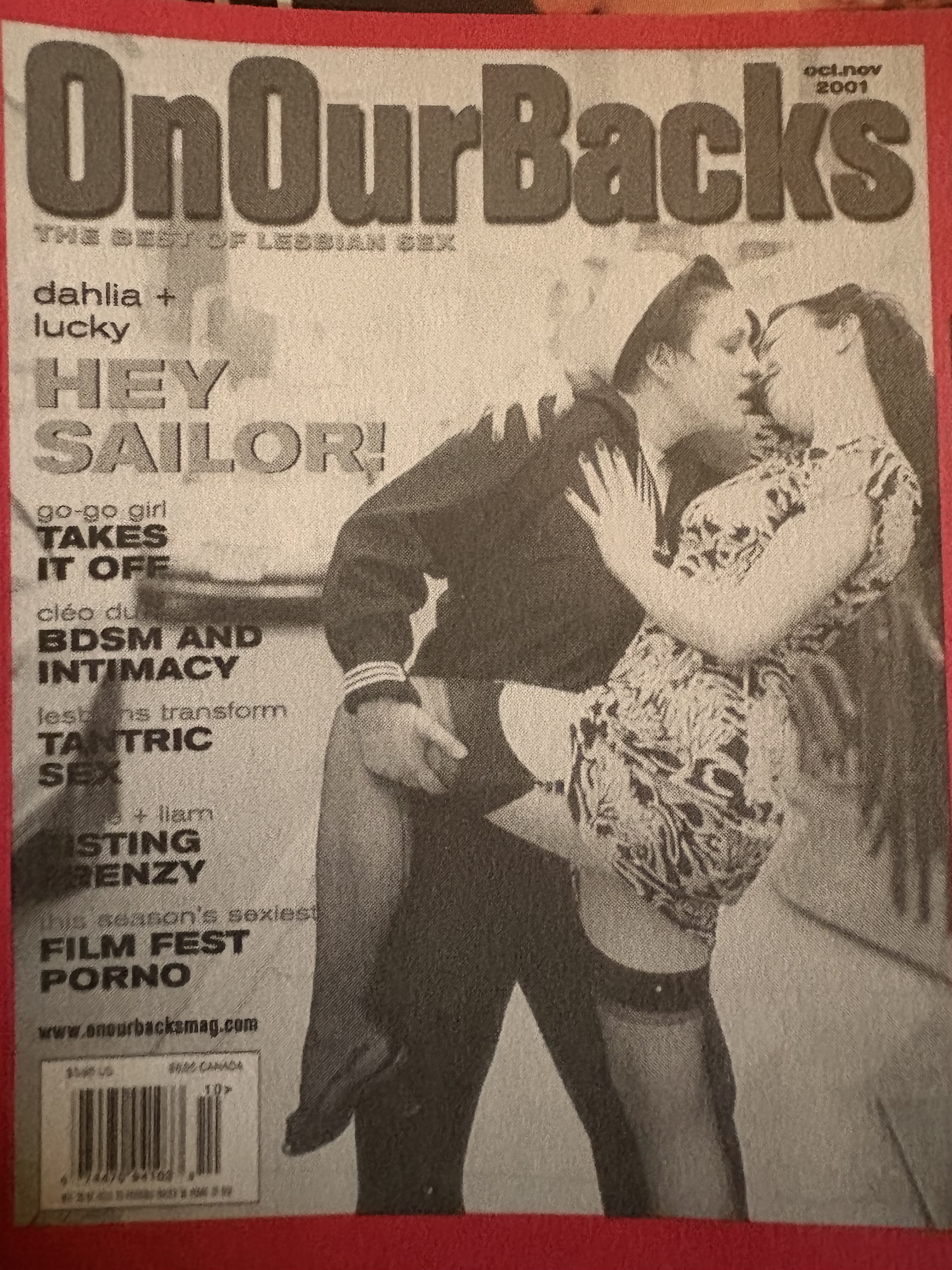
October November 2001 Issue of "On Our Backs"

On Our Backs was the first women-run erotica magazine and the first magazine to feature lesbian erotica for a lesbian audience in the United States. It ran from 1984 to 2006.

== Origin ==
The magazine was first published in 1984 by Debi Sundahl and Myrna Elana, with the contributions of Susie Bright, Nan Kinney, Leon Mostovoy, Honey Lee Cottrell, Dawn Lewis, Shelby Sharie Cohen, Happy Hyder, Tee Corinne, Jewelle Gomez, Judith Stein, Joan Nestle, Patrick Califia, Morgan Gwenwald, Katie Niles, Noreen Scully, Sarita Johnson, and others. Susie Bright became editor-in-chief for the next six years. Later editors included Diane Anderson-Minshall, Shar Rednour, Tristan Taormino, and Diana Cage. On Our Backs defined the look and politics of lesbian culture in the 1980s, as well as playing a definitive role in the feminist sex wars of the period, taking the side of sex-positive feminism.

The title of the magazine was a satirical reference to off our backs, a long-running feminist newspaper that published the work of many anti-pornography feminists during the 1980s, and which the founders of On Our Backs considered prudish about sexuality. off our backs regarded the new magazine as "pseudo-feminist" and threatened legal action over the logo OOB.

== Operations ==
In 1985, Sundahl and Kinney began a spinoff of a series of lesbian erotic videos, called Fatale Video. Distribution of On Our Backs in Australia began in 1986. By the late 1980s, Fatale Media was the largest producer of lesbian pornography in the world.

In 1994, the magazine experienced financial problems, and filed for bankruptcy in May 1996. After being bought out by a new publisher, Melissa Murphy (who released only one issue), it was acquired by HAF Enterprises (publisher of Girlfriends and Inside Pride Guides). HAF Enterprises heaquarters operated out of 3415 Cesar Chavez, Ste 101 in San Francisco, CA. The original creators moved on to other projects.

== Background ==
On Our Backs was one of the few sex-positive lesbian magazines that were being published at the time; the others being Bad Attitude, which lasted from 1984 to 2006; and Lesbian Contradiction, which lasted from 1982 to 1994.

On Our Backs was known for its "fleshy photos," according to gender studies philosopher Judith Butler. It was meant to represent the perceived lesbian experience and the political atmosphere in mainstream culture. It was situated within the lesbian sex wars.

== End of publication and availability online ==
HAF.'s publications of On Our Backs and its sister publication, Girlfriends, both ceased in March 2006 after being bought out by the publishers of Velvetpark Magazine. Reveal Digital, a JSTOR-hosted digital collection, digitized issues of On Our Backs from July 1984 to December 2004; however, due to concerns regarding access by minors and contributor privacy, the scans were removed from Reveal Digital's Independent Voices collection.

== See also ==
- Feminist pornography
- Lesbian feminism
- Lesbian literature
- List of lesbian periodicals
- Lex, social and dating app, based on the personal ads of On Our Backs
