= Chrissy Conant =

American artist

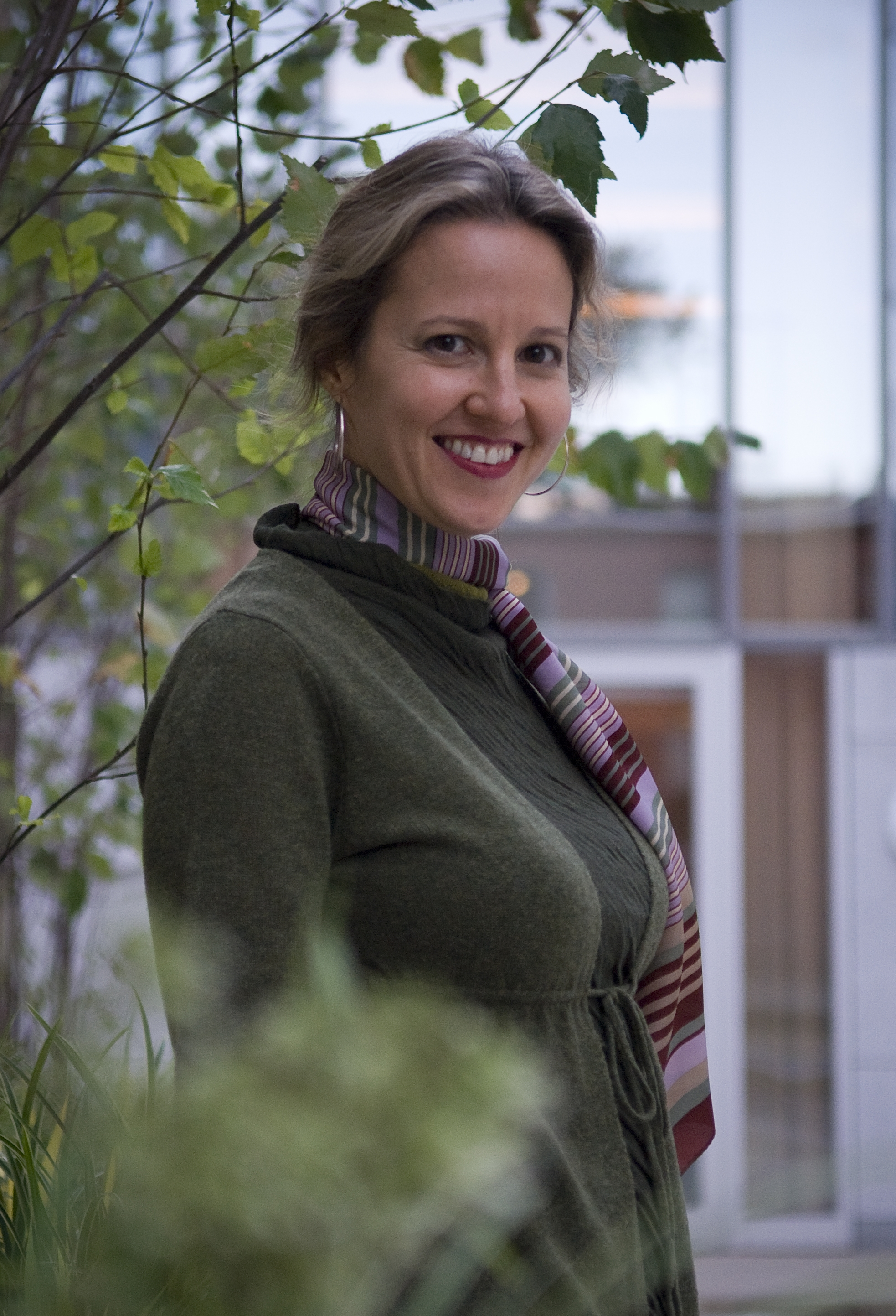
- Chrissy Conant, 2008
- Born: Kailua, Hawaii, U.S.
- Occupation: Artist
- Website: http://www.chrissyconant.com, http://www.chrissycaviar.com

Chrissy Conant is an American artist who created works such as Chrissy Caviar and Chrissy Skin Rug. Her BioArt works have aroused strong responses and have been a basis for discussions of the body, art, and ethics.

== Early life ==
Chrissy Conant was born in Hawaii and grew up in Princeton, New Jersey. She currently lives and works in New York City.

== Education ==
Conant has a Bachelor of Arts in art history from Boston University and a Master of Fine Arts in computer art from the School of Visual Arts.

== Artworks ==
Conant says that her work reflects her personal struggles and that she finds the painstaking processes of creating them cathartic. Her artworks include the following:

=== Chrissy Caviar ===
Conant researched the harvesting of fish eggs for caviar, and the process of in vitro fertilization (IVF). She then went through extensive physical treatments to create a 'product' from herself, which she carefully prepared and presented under the brand name Chrissy Caviar. She documented the entire process on video.

Conant injected herself for six weeks with fertility drugs so that she would produce multiple eggs, followed by a final hormone injection to make the eggs mature at the same time. An endocrinologist and embryologist harvested her eggs in a forty-five-minute hospital procedure. Conant carefully placed each of her thirteen eggs in a flask filled with human tubal fluid, a saline solution used to preserve and transport human ova for IVF. Each flask was set in a jar of clear silicone gel, sealed, and labelled with a photograph of the artist reclining and the information that the jar contains "one egg" "Caucasian" with "human tubal fluid" which must be refrigerated properly. Conant even applied for and received a trademark for Chrissy Caviar®, registered as both a "food product" and as "DNA".

An installation of the Chrissy Caviar project, including the video and a deli case containing the bottled eggs, debuted at the Aldrich Museum of Contemporary Art in May 2002. Conant refused to agree to a chef's "tasting" of her eggs, but has said that she would sell the deli case and its contents. Chrissy Caviar has been shown at a number of exhibitions, including Molecules that Matter at the Chemical Heritage Foundation in 2008, where Conant gave a guest lecture entitled "An Artist Hijacks the Biochemistry of Life".

The exhibit has been considered thought-provoking BioArt, "encouraging viewers to think about bigger issues surrounding the ethical limits of art and the use of reproductive technologies". Conant has said that she hoped the work would provoke strong reactions, and wanted to spur discussion of women's conflicts about child-bearing, particularly as they get older. Chrissy Caviar has been criticized for its commodification of the body and used as a basis of discussions for both art and ethics.

=== Chrissy Skin Rug ===
For Chrissy Skin Rug, Conant was covered with Vaseline and a mold-making silicone to make a life-sized, flesh-colored silicone rubber cast of her body. From this, she created a "human skin" rug, spread on a wood floor, with a lifelike head and hair attached. It was displayed at Morgan Lehman Gallery in a show entitled Sexy Time: a Group Effort in 2008. The piece was intended to spur consideration of sexism, gender, and commonalities between people and animals. It demonstrates how "women are dehumanized when treated as one-dimensional sex objects", and has been described as "disconcerting" and uncomfortably voyeuristic.

=== Teddy Chrissy ===
Teddy Chrissy takes a teddy bear and transforms it into self-protective armor. Conant deconstructed a teddy bear, replacing the fur with stainless steel pins and stuffing the bear with steel wool.

=== Chrissy Homeland Security Blanket ===
Conant created the Chrissy Homeland Security Blanket in March 2003. Described as a "three-part sculptural project", she incorporated the U.S. Department of Homeland Security terms for levels of threat, "severe," "high," "elevated," "guarded," and "low" to make colorful chokers, blankets, and wall hangings. She also applied for the trademark "Chrissy Homeland Security® Blanket". Conant's use of the trademark "Homeland Security Blanket" was later contested by Shirley Ivins. According to trademark records, although Ivins did file for the trademark, her registration was cancelled because she did not file an acceptable declaration. The Chrissy Homeland Security Blanket has been included in exhibitions such as Pillow Pageant and Uncomfortable Conversations. It has been described as an "unsettling" indicator of the inner battle between security and anxiety, and the marketing of fear.

=== Every Kept Book I Have Read ===
Every Kept Book I Have Read is a text-based sculpture, incorporating vinyl, cement, goat leather, paper, board, and gold. It is intended to suggest connections between books, consumerism, memory, and holding on to the past.

== Solo exhibitions ==
- Project Room, Stefan Stux Gallery, New York, NY (2002)

== Group exhibitions ==
Conant's works have been exhibited in group exhibitions including the following:

- Unbound, One of a Kind: Unique Artists' Books, curated by Heide Hatry, Dalhousie Art Gallery, Halifax, Nova Scotia (2012)
- Burn Before Reading, Curated by Lilah Freedland, Scope NY, NY (2012)
- Pillow Pageant, curated by Emily Stevenson and Natalie Fizer, A.I.R. Gallery, DUMBO Arts Festival, Brooklyn, NY
- Uncomfortable Conversations, curated by Liz Kinnmark, Int'l Contemporary Furniture Fair, New York, NY (2010)
- Molecules That Matter, Chemical Heritage Foundation, Philadelphia, PA, and Francis Young Tang Teaching Museum at Skidmore College in Saratoga Springs, NY (2008)
