= RESYST =

RESYST (Resources for Youth, Students, and Trainers) is an organization that was started in the San Francisco Bay Area by Amy Sonnie and yk hong in 2000 in conjunction with the release of Revolutionary Voices: A Multicultural Queer Youth Anthology (ISBN 1555835589) edited by Amy Sonnie (Alyson: 2000).

== Goal ==
The goal of the organization, as stated by Sonnie, was "to further build a community of queer artists and activists that recognizes the role of art and writing in social change and seeks to develop those skills as weapons against oppression."

== Book Tour ==
The book tour for Revolutionary Voices was also designed to help struggling queer and trans youth. Called the "RESYST/Revolutionary Voices Road Trip," the book tour spurred the creation of several RESYST chapters throughout the United States. The intention of Sonnie's anthology, as well as RESYST, was to prioritize "the voices of the traditionally underrepresented: young women, transgender and bisexual youth, youth of color and mixed-blood youth, differently abled youth, and youth from low-income backgrounds."

== Change ==
RESYST as a network of affiliated grassroots organizations quickly dissolved, however, sending the energies of the radically minded organizers in other directions. Two chapters remained, sharing like-minded goals for radical Queer youth communities and the organizational name, but differing substantially in their activist approach and mission statements.

=== RESYST Seattle ===
RESYST Seattle, founded by Colin Kennedy Donovan and Qwo-Li Driskill in 2000 during the "RESYST/Revolutionary Voices Road Trip," employed an activist-approach rooted in radical popular education and arts movements. Their mission statement reads, "RESYST Seattle is a political and cultural resource for GLBT/Queer activists and educators, particularly youth of color, young women, (dis)abled youth, working class youth, trans youth and other young people from marginalized communities, working to build a movement of youth united for radical social change." RESYST Seattle's final project was the production of the zine, Scars Tell Stories: A Queer and Trans (Dis)ability Zine, published in 2007.

=== RESYST in Pittsburgh ===
RESYST All Forms of Oppression in Pittsburgh, started in 2002 after RESYST's initial emergence, adopted direct action approaches to activism, with a mission statement that states: "It is our mission to work toward an acceptance of the multitude of queer identities and unite through the shared struggles that our differences create so that we can broaden our foundation to effect change. We intend to strengthen the queer liberation movement and inspire the abolition of heterosexism and homophobia in progressive groups through education, outreach, and direct action. We also aim to foster a radical queer community" (Thomas Merton Center). According to their website, RESYST All Forms of Oppression's most recent action took place in 2005.

== See also ==
- LGBT rights in the United States
- List of LGBT rights organizations
