= Half-Life (Krach novel) =

2004 novel by Aaron Krach

- Author: Aaron Krach
- Language: English
- Genre: Novel
- Publisher: Alyson Publications
- Publication date: 2004
- Publication place: United States
- Media type: Print (hardback & paperback)
- ISBN: 1-55583-854-5
- OCLC: 53971973
- Dewey Decimal: 813/.6 22
- LC Class: PS3611.R33 H35 2004

Half-Life is a debut novel by Aaron Krach. Published in 2004 by Alyson Books, the novel was nominated for a Violet Quill Award and was among the 2004 Lambda Literary Award finalists. It discusses young love, coping with death and the issues facing gay youth.

== Plot introduction ==
Two weeks before high school graduation and the geography of 18-year-old Adam Westman's life is about to change dramatically. Many of the familiar landmarks will remain—his best friend Dart riding shotgun; the suburban house where he lives with his dad and younger sister; and the numerous on-ramps and off-ramps that connect him to his hometown of Angelito in the center of centerless Los Angeles. But when death and love, perhaps, arrive unexpectedly, Adam must learn that trouble sometimes has to rumble through a tidy world to make room for the kind of magical connections that make life worth living.

== Reception ==
Half-Life was published to critical acclaim by Alyson Books in 2004. Of Half-Life, Reed Business Information wrote "Gay readers will relish the attention lavished on love's growing pains and the smart dialogue between Adam and his high school buddy".

“Aaron’s writing glides like the camera in a Robert Altman ensemble piece, picking up and illuminating details to slowly, invisibly build a greater whole. There’s not a word, sentence or piece of dialogue out of place, or unnecessary, in this beautifully rendered meditation on human nature and relationships.” —Gay Times

“Krach’s engrossing tale offers much insight into various worlds —from that of gay teens who chill in 7-Eleven parking lots to the emotional landscapes of loss and mourning to young, fresh love.” —Beth Greenfield, Time Out New York

== Nominations ==
- 2004, nominated for Lambda Literary Award
- 2004, nominated for a Violet Quill Award
