= Alyson Books =

American publishing house

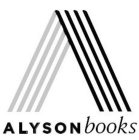
- Parent company: Regent Media
- Founded: 1980
- Founder: Sasha Alyson
- Country of origin: United States
- Headquarters location: New York City
- Publication types: Books
- Official website: www.alyson.com

Alyson Books, formerly known as Alyson Publications, was a book publishing house which specialized in LGBT fiction and non-fiction. Former publisher Don Weise described it as "the world's oldest and largest publisher of LGBT literature" and "the home of award-winning books in the areas of memoir, history, humor, commercial fiction, mystery, and erotica, among many others".

== History ==
Founded in Boston in 1980 by Sasha Alyson, Alyson Publications was one of the oldest and largest presses with a focus on gay and lesbian, and eventually LGBTQ, literature. The press engaged in a wide variety of genres. Michael Nava compared Alyson Publications's scope to that of its contemporary, Naiad Press. However, Naiad focused predominantly on lesbian literature, while Nava cited Alyson Publications as the main publisher of gay men's literature at the time.

In 1986 Alyson published one of the first anthologies of Black gay men's writing: In the Life: A Black Gay Anthology, edited by Joseph Beam. Alyson was also the first publisher of prominent Black gay writers like Larry Duplechan, Steven Corbin, and James Earl Hardy. Nava's The Little Death, published by Alyson, became the press's first book to receive a review in The New York Times. In 1988, it created the 96-page anthology You Can Do Something About AIDS, soliciting essays from Whoppi Goldberg, Elizabeth Taylor, C. Everett Koop, and others. Alyson Publications shared over a million copies of the book for free in U.S. bookstores.

=== 1990s ===
In 1990, Alyson Publications began to sell LGBT-themed children's books, entitled Alyson Wonderland. They published some of the first queer children's books, beginning with Daddy's Roommate by Michael Willhoite and Heather Has Two Mommies by Lesléa Newman. Both books received intense media attention and controversy. They were listed on the American Library Association's list of the top ten most-banned books in the U.S. for years.

In 1992, Alyson broadcast his plan to sell the company so that he could spend more time on AIDS activism. In 1994, he passed off management to Alistair Williamson. That same year, Alyson Publications and Sasha Alyson received the New England Booksellers Association's Publisher of the Year award. The press was acquired by Liberation Publications in 1995. Liberation Publications already published the LGBTQ magazines The Advocate and Out, and they added a new imprint to Alyson Publications: Advocate Books.

=== 2000s ===
During the late 1990s and 2000s, Alyson Publications released a number of books focusing on LGBTQ experiences in U.S. higher education institutions. In 2000, Alyson Publications released Out & About Campus: Personal Accounts By Lesbian, Gay, Bisexual & Transgendered College Students, edited by Kim Howard and Annie Stevens. This was notable for being one of the first anthologies to share LGBTQ college student experiences, rather than those of faculty and staff. In 2001, they published Secret Sisters: Stories of Being Lesbian in a College Sorority, extending the themes of their earlier Out on Fraternity Row. Both books were edited by Shane L. Windmeyer and Pamela W. Freeman.

In 2006, Alyson Publications collaborated with The Advocate to create a guide to colleges centering on their support and resourcing for LGBTQ students and studies. The Advocate College Guide for LGBT Students recruited 5,000 students and 500 faculty and staff to conduct interviews on over 100 U.S. higher education institutions. The first such guide, The Gay, Lesbian, and Bisexual Students’ Guide to Colleges, Universities, and Graduate Schools, was published in 1994 by New York University Press. Alyson Publications's guide differed in the means of obtaining data for its ratings, by heavily recruiting interview subjects online.

Alyson Publications was again sold to Regent Entertainment Media, Inc. in 2008, and in November, as Alyson Books, named Don Weise its publisher. He has written of his commitment to Alyson's traditional areas of specialisation, but has stated that he is keen also to embrace "more serious nonfiction—particularly in the areas of current affairs, politics, self-help, and autobiography—as well as literary fiction and works by today's most respected LGBT authors."

In 2010, Publishers Weekly announced that Alyson Books would switch to digital (e-book) publishing only, with plans to convert backlist titles in this fashion. Don Weise left Alyson at that time.

As of 2019, the URL for the Alyson Books website produces a "DNS resolution error" message.

== Some books published by Alyson ==
- "Gay Old Girls" (ISBN 1555834760) by Zsa Zsa Gershick (Joshua Irving Gershick)
- amnesty (ISBN 1-55583-381-0) by Louise A. Blum
- "Secret Service: Untold Stories of Lesbians in the Military" (ISBN 0739454234) by Zsa Zsa Gershick (Joshua Irving Gershick)
- Death Trick (ISBN 0-932870-27-9), by Richard Stevenson
- 101 Gay Sex Secrets Revealed (ISBN 978-1555838515), by Jonathan Bass
- How to Get Laid: The Gay Man's Essential Guide to Hot Sex (ISBN 978-1555838867), by Jonathan Bass
- Finding H.F. (ISBN 1-55583-622-4), a young adult novel by Julia Watts
- Young, Gay and Proud (ISBN 1-55583-001-3), edited by Sasha Alyson and Lynne Yamaguchi Fletcher
- The Dykes to Watch Out For comic strip by Alison Bechdel
- Lesbian Lists: A Look at Lesbian Culture, History, and Personalities (ISBN 1-55583-163-X) by Dell Richards (1990)
- The Second Coming: A Leatherdyke Reader (ISBN 1-55583-281-4), edited by Pat Califia and Robin Sweeney
- Melting Point (ISBN 1-55583-162-1), short stories by Pat Califia
- Doing it for Daddy (ISBN 1-55583-227-X), short stories by Pat Califia
- Macho Sluts (ISBN 1-55583-115-X), erotic fiction by Pat Califia
- Doc and Fluff (ISBN 1-55583-176-1), a novel by Pat Califia
- Latter Days (ISBN 1-55583-868-5), novelization by T. Fabris for the 2003 major motion picture of the same name
- The First Gay Pope and Other Records, by Lynne Yamaguchi Fletcher
- The Femme Mystique (ISBN 1-55583-255-5), short stories edited by Lesléa Newman
- Pillow Talk (ISBN 1-55583-419-1), short stories edited by Lesléa Newman
- Pills, Thrills, Chills and Heartache (ISBN 1555837530), Los Angeles Times bestseller and 2004 Lambda Literary Awards finalist, edited by Clint Catalyst and Michelle Tea
- The Lillian Byrd crime fiction series, by Elizabeth Sims
- Revolutionary Voices: A Multicultural Queer Youth Anthology (ISBN 1-55583-558-9), edited by Amy Sonnie
- The Trouble with Harry Hay: Founder of the Modern Gay Movement, by Stuart Timmons
- Half-Life, a novel by Aaron Krach
- Out on Fraternity Row: Personal Accounts of Being Gay in a College Fraternity, by Shane Windmeyer
- Secret Sisters: Stories of Being Lesbian & Bisexual in a College Sorority
- Best Lesbian Love Stories, 2003–2005, edited by Angela Brown
- Mentsh: On Being Jewish and Queer, edited by Angela Brown
- Love, Bourbon Street: Reflections of New Orleans, edited by Greg Herren and Paul J. Willis—winner 2006 Lambda Literary Award for Anthology
- Bi Any Other Name: Bisexual People Speak Out (ISBN 1-55583-174-5), edited by Loraine Hutchins and Lani Kaʻahumanu
- The Bisexual's Guide to the Universe, by Michael Szymanski and Nicole Kristal—winner 2006 Lambda Literary Award for Bisexual
- Entangled Lives: Memoirs of 7 Top Erotica Writers (ISBN 1-55583-998-3), edited by Marilyn Jaye Lewis
- First You Fall a novel by Scott Sherman, winner of the Lambda Literary Foundation Award, 2009, Best Gay Mystery
- Girl Meets Girl: A Dating Survival Guide 2007 (ISBN 978-1-55583-989-5) by Diana Cage
- One Teenager in 10 (ISBN 0932870260), edited by Ann Heron
- Foreskin: A Closer Look (ISBN 978-1555832124) by Bud Berkeley
- The Men with the Pink Triangle: The True, Life-and-Death Story of Homosexuals in the Nazi Death Camps (ISBN 1-55583-006-4) by Heinz Heger and translated by David Fernbach (1980)
- Franny: The Queen of Provincetown (ISBN 0-932870-31-7) by John Preston (1983)
- The Little Death (ISBN 0-932870-96-1) by Michael Nava (1986)
- The Mission of Alex Kane gay adventure series by John Preston (1984-1987)
