= Diana Cage =

American writer (born 1979)

- Born: July 16, 1979 (age 47); San Diego, California
- Occupation: Author
- Website: www.dianacage.com

Diana Cage (born July 16, 1979) is an American author, editor, radio personality, and academic whose work focuses on sexuality, dating, intimacy, and queer culture. She is author and editor of eight books on sex and relationships, including the Lambda Literary Award–winning Lesbian Sex Bible, and served as editor of several influential lesbian publications of the 2000s, including On Our Backs, Velvetpark, and GO magazine. From 2006 to 2009 she hosted The Diana Cage Show on SiriusXM, an advice and call-in show focused on lesbian sex, dating, and queer life.

== Career ==
Cage began writing about sex and culture while interning at the San Francisco-based magazine Future Sex. In 2000 she joined On Our Backs, the long-running lesbian erotica magazine founded in 1984, and served as its editor until 2005. Under her editorship, the magazine expanded its representation of lesbian sex and sexual identity.

Heather Findlay, publisher of both On Our Backs and Girlfriends (magazine), praised Cage's "lack of self censorship" as an editor, saying, "[Cage] is not uptight about all forms of lesbian sexual expression. She really has no prejudgments about alternative sexuality." Cage has likewise been praised as an "unapologetic pioneer" in the evolution of progressive, sex-positive lesbian culture.

After leaving On Our Backs, Cage continued working in queer media as editor of Velvetpark and GO. She has also been a regular columnist for Girlfriends, Kitchen Sink, Shewired, Quartz, Frontiers, Good Vibes, Ourchart, and Velvetpark. In 2008 she was named one of GO Magazine's "100 Women We Love."

The Publishing Triangle named the On Our Backs Guide to Lesbian Sex one of the Most Notable Books of 2004.

From 2006 to 2009 Cage was host of The Diana Cage Show on SiriusXM The show was celebrated for Cage's bombastic monologues, incisive commentary on current events, and unflinching advice on love and sex.

== Radio and Television ==
Cage was formerly host of The Diana Cage Show on SiriusXM, an advice and culture program covering sex, dating, and current events. The show was noted for Cage's monologues, commentary, and frank advice on love and sex. She was a recurring guest on The Derek and Romaine Show on SiriusXM and appeared as a series regular on Here TV, the LGBT cable network.

Cage was a featured commentator on Here TV's Lesbian Sex and Sexuality and a regular guest on Here with Josh and Sara. She has appeared as a featured commentator or guest on Logo, Sex TV (Canada), Canal Jimmy (Italy), and Huffington Post Live.

== Books ==
Cage's The Lesbian Sex Bible: The New Guide to Sexual Love for Same-Sex Couples (Quiver/Hachette, 2014) won a 2015 Lambda Literary Award.

Her 2012 book Mind-Blowing Sex: A Woman's Guide (Seal Press) traces the history of female sexual oppression and liberation as a frame for sexual self-knowledge.

Earlier titles include Girl Meets Girl: A Dating Survival Guide (2009), Threeways: Fulfill Your Ultimate Fantasy (2006), the IPPY Award–nominated Box Lunch: A Layperson's Guide to Cunnilingus (2004), and The On Our Backs Guide to Lesbian Sex (2004). She edited the anthologies On Our Backs: The Best Erotic Fiction (2004) and Bottoms Up: Writing About Sex (Soft Skull Press, 2004).

== Bibliography ==
- Cage, Diana (2004). On our backs guide to lesbian sex. Los Angeles, California: Alyson Books. ISBN 9781555838058.
- Cage, Diana (2004). On our backs: the best erotic fiction (volume 2). Los Angeles, California: Alyson Books. ISBN 9781555838423.
- Cage, Diana (2004). Box lunch: a layperson's guide to cunnilingus. Los Angeles, California: Alyson Books. ISBN 9781555838492.
- Cage, Diana (2004). Bottoms up: writing about sex. Brooklyn, New York Berkeley, California: Soft Skull Press. ISBN 9781932360295.
- Cage, Diana (2006). Threeways: fulfil your ultimate fantasy. Los Angeles, California London: Alyson Books. ISBN 9781555839390.
- Cage, Diana (2007). Girl meets girl: a dating survival guide. New York: Alyson Books. ISBN 9781555839895.
- Cage, Diana (2012). Mind-blowing sex: a woman's guide. Berkeley, California: Seal Press. ISBN 9781580053891.
- Cage, Diana (2014). The lesbian sex bible: the complete guide to sexual love for same-sex couples. Beverly, Massachusetts: Quiver. ISBN 9781592336142.

== TV/radio/video ==
- Huffington Post Live, What Does it Mean to Identify as Queer, June 28, 2013
- Huffington Post Live, Decoding the Lesbian Mystique, June 24, 2013
- SiriusXM, recurring guest, The Derek and Romaine Show, 2004–2012
- SiriusXM, host, The Diana Cage Show, 2007–2009
- LOGO, featured commenter, CBS News on Logo, 2008
- Canal Jimmy (Italy), featured commenter, The L Word promo, 2007
- Here!, interview, Girls on Girls, September 2008
- Here!, interview, Here with Josh and Sara, August 2008
- Here!, featured commenter, Lesbian Sex and Sexuality Seasons 1 and 2, 2006, 2008
- SiriusXM, interview, The Michaelangelo Signorile Show, 2007
- Blowfish, producer and host, The Radio Blowfish Variety Show, 2005–2006
- Sex TV (Canada), featured commenter, Lesbian Erotica, 2002
