= Jacob Anderson-Minshall =

American author

- Born: September 14, 1967 (age 58); Inkom, Idaho, U.S.
- Education: Earlham College (BA); Idaho State University (MA)
- Occupation: Author
- Spouse: Diane Anderson-Minshall (m. 2006)

Jacob Anderson-Minshall (born September 14, 1967) is an American author.

== Early life and education ==
Assigned as female at birth, Anderson-Minshall was raised Catholic on a farm outside of Inkom, Idaho.

He cites his mother's influence in social justice issues sparking his interest since preschool, and went with his mom to women's rights rallies and campaigned for the Equal Rights Amendment. In high school, he spent a year in Germany as part of the Congress-Bundestag Youth Exchange Program. He also participated in anti-nuclear protests. In college, Anderson-Minshall was active in the anti-Apartheid movement opposing South Africa's system of apartheid and supporting South Africa's non-whites, and marched in support of women's reproductive rights.

He received a B.A. in Peace and Global Studies from Earlham College in Richmond, Indiana and a master's degree in communication from Idaho State University in Pocatello.

== Career ==
After graduating he canvassed for anti-nuclear group SANE/FREEZE and other efforts before focusing on lesbian and gays rights.

Anderson-Minshall later passed the National Park Service's law enforcement Ranger Academy becoming a park ranger in the 1990s patrolling, the "forested lands above Silicon Valley, bay and ocean-side parks and rolling hills north of San Francisco." He was disabled in a work-related injury in 2003; at which point Anderson-Minshall returned to writing.

In 1994, with his lesbian partner Diane Anderson-Minshall and several friends, Anderson-Minshall co-founded the lesbian magazine Girlfriends, where he was the Circulation Director and wrote articles for several years.

As a freelance journalist, he has focused on environmental and LGBT issues and has written for numerous publications like Bitch and Curve magazines, SheWired.com and Windy City Times and Glamour From 2005 to 2009, Anderson-Minshall authored the syndicated column "TransNation", which ran in LGBT publications like San Francisco Bay Times, Windy City Times, and Boston's Bay Windows.

In 2016, with his wife, Anderson-Minshall launched the editorial services company Retrograde Communications, which took over the editorial services for Plus magazine (for those affected by HIV) and HIVPlusMag.com from Here Media. A year later the company took over the editorial for the print edition of the LGBT news magazine The Advocate now owned by Pride Media. Anderson-Minshall now serves as the deputy editor of Plus and the deputy editor of The Advocate.

Anderson-Minshall and his wife have co-authored the Blind Eye mystery series, including Blind Curves, Blind Leap and 2008 Lambda Literary Award finalist Blind Faith, published by Bold Strokes Books.

Anderson-Minshall has essays in a number of anthologies including Men Speak Out: Views on Gender, Sex and Power (edited by Shira Tarrant) and Trans People in Love.

His first short story, "Chinook", was published in the 2010 Lambda Literary Award finalist anthology Portland Queer: Tales of the Rose City.

In 2008, Anderson-Minshall co-founded and co-hosts the talk radio show Gender Blender in the United States, on Portland, Oregon's KBOO.

In 2015, Anderson-Minshall became the first openly transgender author to win a Goldie award from the Golden Crown Literary Society; he shared the award for best creative non-fiction book with his wife Diane Anderson-Minshall for Queerly Beloved: A Love Story Across Genders.

In 2018, Anderson-Minshall released his first novel, Swimming Upstream, through Transgress Press.

== Personal ==
After coming out as lesbian after college, Anderson-Minshall also came out as transgender in 2004 and began gender transitioning. He met his wife Diane at an LGBT pride rally in college, and they married March 19, 2006.
