= Lex (app) =

Text-based LGBTQ+ social and dating app

- Other names: Personals
- Initial release: 2019
- Operating system: iOS, Android
- Available in: English
- Type: Social discovery
- License: Proprietary software
- Website: www.lex.lgbt

Lex is a dating and social app launched in 2019 for LGBTQ+ users. The service has a text post centered feed, rather than an emphasis on profiles or images. Users post freeform written ads in the style of newspaper classified personal ads or Craigslist personals, to message boards for specific geographical areas to seek dates, connections, and community. The app supports many kinds of connection, including dates, hookups, group meetups, networking, and events. Lex also hosts occasional dating and socializing events in physical locations.

Lex originated from an Instagram account which posted personal ads of followers inspired by queer magazines of the past, like The Village Voice and On Our Backs. The app describes itself as being more community oriented and less "superficial" than mainstream dating services such as Tinder and Grindr as well as more focus on free expression and description.

The app has raised $7 million in funding, and has been recognized as a top Pride app by app stores. Within the LGBTQ+ community and its userbase, Lex has been criticized for data handling practices, diversity and representation, and a transition away from dating and hookups to a more general social focus.

== History ==
Lex grew out of a 2017 Instagram account where people, predominantly women, submitted personal ads for publication to the account. The Instagram account, @*h_e_r_s_t_o_r_y* later @personals, was founded in 2014 by Kell Rakowski' to celebrate lesbian history by sharing content from 80s and 90s erotica magazine On Our Backs including the personals ads. The interest in the ads led her to create @personals for sharing the self-penned ads of followers, circulating them throughout the month. The account would also repost and promote the stories of couples who had met through @personals, which can also be read on the hashtag "MetOnPersonals."

The account grew in popularity, sharing 10,000 personal ads in two years. Many more personal ads were being submitted than could be circulated or managed by a central account. Kell Rakowski and Jennifer Rhiannon Lewis launched a crowdfunding campaign to create an independent dating app based on the style of classified ads due to the success and demand within the Instagram project. The campaign raised $50,000. Within the first year, the pair also raised $1.5 million in seed funding. They intended to create a space for dating and hookups for the LGBTQ+ community members not served by mainstream dating apps or the dating/hookup apps aimed at gay and bisexual men.

The app launched with 10,000 downloads on the first day. Initially, the focus of the app was on dating and cruising through personal ads posted to regional feeds. Users had a limit on the number of ads per month. The app had no images at all, and profile information was very limited as well. Over time additional features were added to reflect the way users were engaging - groups were added as were events. Profile pictures and more extensive profile options were also added. The app also went a significant shift in focus from dating to a much greater emphasis on friendship and community, accompanied by new branding. Reactions within the userbase were mixed as the app's identity changed away from the erotica magazine personal ads that had been its source material. The shift in focus for the app, accompanied with the rebranding and addition of premium features raised $7 million in funding. In mid-2024, the app added "Team Gay Agenda", a monthly pledge drive for the site and laid off staff. In 2024, Lex was acquired by 9count.

== Features & user experience ==
Users can engage in various interactions, from one-on-one chats to group discussions, and explore local LGBTQ+ events. Users have a limited number of ads they can post a month, unless paying for premium features.

Unlike other dating apps, the personals that users submit are freeform requests into a feed. Users can filter the feed by their location and by profile attributes of the underlying account.

As the app has grown, and post-acquisition, it has begun to share more features with other dating apps.

== Reception, criticisms and impact ==
Reaction to Lex was initially positive, with users praising its unique approach to connecting individuals beyond physical appearances as well as its original independent status. Many users have found the platform refreshing in its rejection of the image-centric model prevalent in other dating apps like Tinder and Grindr.

The flexibility of the post-based interface also avoids the limitations of the matching systems used in other dating apps. Lex avoids strict labels and identifiers, allowing queer, trans, and non-binary individuals to connect without the constraints of conventional categorization. This approach led Lex to building a more diverse user base and set of purposes, rather than as an afterthought. The realization of a need for community social apps that support dating, but also other features led to the shift in Lex's focus and brand. Some users also feel the shift is related to seeking more funding and avoiding potential censorship.

Criticism has arisen regarding accessibility issues related to its design, as well as discussions around diversity and representation within its user base. A notable incident in 2023 highlighted concerns over "white privilege" in the app's community, igniting debates on inclusivity. Even before the launch of the Lex app, the original Instagram had issues with hateful comments on ads.

Additionally, privacy remains a focal point, with users expressing apprehensions about data handling practices, even as Lex emphasizes user safety and transparency. Lex's original focus on text based communication and free use of usernames might also support safety for community users.
