= Julia Watts =

American fiction writer

Julia Watts is an American fiction writer.

== Career ==
Julia Watts is the author of novels, short stories, etc., especially in the genres of young adult fiction and lesbian fiction/erotica. Her novels include Finding H.F. for which she won the 2001 Lambda Literary Award in the children/young adult category. She was nominated again for the 2005 award in the erotica category as one of the authors of the story collection Once Upon a Dyke: New Exploits of Fairy Tale Lesbians. Women's Studies was a finalist for a Golden Crown Literary Society award. Her young adult novel, Kindred Spirits, is for the emerging press Beanpole Books. Her 2018 novel, Quiver was awarded a Perfect Tens Award by VOYA and the Fall 2018 OKRA Pick by Southern Independent Booksellers Alliance. In addition to her fiction work, Watts recently co-edited an anthology of essays, memoirs and stories on the sensitive topic of menstruation titled Women. Period.

Watts holds a master's in fine arts, which she obtained from Spalding University. Watts resides in Knoxville, Tennessee, where she teaches at South College.

== Bibliography ==
=== Novels ===
- Wildwood Flowers (1996)
- Phases of the Moon (1997)
- Piece of My Heart (1998)
- Wedding Bell Blues (1999)
- Mixed Blessings
- Finding H.F. (2001) -- Winner Lambda Literary Award
- Women's Studies (2006)
- The Kind of Girl I Am (Novel) (2008)
- Secret City (2013) -- Nominated Lambda Literary Award
- Hypnotizing Chickens (2014)
- Quiver (2018)
- Needlework (2021)

=== Miranda Jasper Series (Young Adult) ===
- Kindred Spirits (2008)
- Free Spirits (2009)
- Revived Spirits (2011)

=== Other writings ===
- Once Upon a Dyke: New Exploits of Fairy Tale Lesbians (2004) Novella "Le Belle Rose"
- Bell, Book and Dyke: New Exploits of Magical Lesbians (2005) Novella "Skyclad"
- Stake through the Heart: New Exploits of Twilight Lesbians (2006) Novella "We Recruit"
- Tall in the Saddle: New Exploits of Western Lesbians (2007) Novella "The Sweetheart and the Spitfire"
- Women. Period. (editor with Parneshia Jones, Jo Ruby and Elizabeth Slade) (2008)
