= Timothy J. Boham =

American convicted murderer

Timothy John Boham is a former gay pornographic film actor who performed under the name Marcus Allen, who was convicted in 2009 of first-degree murder in the shooting death of 43-year-old Denver businessman John Paul "J P" Kelso.

His case is featured on the Season 2, Episode 9 titled “Betting on Death”, from the show, Deadly Sins and on the season 1, episode 2 titled “The Porn Identity”, from the show Lethally Blonde.

== Pornography career ==
In November 2002, Boham appeared on the cover of Freshmen magazine (a magazine focusing on 18- to 25-year-old gay men). In the annual survey in 2003, Boham was voted "Freshman of the Year" by a wide margin, and again appeared on the cover in June 2003. This led to opportunities such as with Falcon Entertainment.

With Falcon Entertainment, Boham appeared in a dozen adult movies under the name "Marcus Allen" in 2004 and 2005. He was also in Channel I Releasing/Rascal Entertainment's "Never Been Touched" by Chi Chi LaRue. As Marcus Allen, Boham was on the cover of Mandate magazine in July 2006, apparently for All World's Video. Boham also appeared on the cover of Playgirl Magazine's "campus hunks" issue (November 2006) (and is advertised as "John" of Denver, Colorado, and as having a "smooth body and 'softer' side", p. 32–34).

== Murder of John Paul Kelso ==
The Advocate reported that Boham left porn about a year before the murder and went to live in Denver, eventually working for John Paul "J P" Kelso but only for about 10 days before failing to show up for his job. Kelso was co-owner of a Denver debt recovery business called Professional Recovery Systems; he was a philanthropist "... giving away hundreds of thousands of dollars to charities around the world...." and was openly gay. Co-workers at the debt recovery business described Boham as "... bright and... [that] it seemed like he had his mind on something else."

A housekeeper found Kelso, 43, shot to death in the bathtub of his upscale Congress Park home on November 13, 2006. The police named Boham as a suspect in the slaying. Boham was arrested on November 16 at the Mexico-U.S. border in Lukeville, Arizona, after identifying himself as the subject of a murder warrant to Customs and Border officers. He was extradited to Colorado and held without bond.

During [Boham's preliminary hearing], Denver Detective Aaron Lopez testified that in a jailhouse interview in Arizona, where Boham was arrested Nov. 16, Boham said Kelso had asked him to go into the master bedroom to cuddle. But Boham, who said he needed money for his girlfriend, had other plans, Lopez testified. Boham also cut open the safe and found no money in it, the detective said.

According to the Denver Post, Boham told his family that he killed Kelso because he believed that he kept a lot of money in his household safe. "Court documents claim that Boham had bipolar disorder and was prone to fits of rage, and that he told his mother that he had planned to use the money to go to South America with his girlfriend." But Boham said his plan went awry when Kelso refused to open the safe, and there was a brief struggle during which he accidentally shot Kelso, according to the Post. "Lopez said that Boham confessed to both his sister and mother before leaving for Arizona. Before leaving, he repeatedly returned to Kelso's home to clean it up, in hopes that his fingerprints and DNA wouldn't be discovered."."

=== Trial ===
Boham's trial for murder started with jury selection on June 1, 2009.

He was found guilty on June 9, 2009, and sentenced to life in prison without the possibility of parole. He is currently incarcerated at the Sterling Correctional Facility.

== See also ==
- List of pornographic movie studios
- List of male performers in gay porn films
