= Finding H.F. =

Book by Julia Watts

- Author: Julia Watts
- Language: English
- Genre: Young Adult novel
- Publisher: Alyson Books
- Publication date: 2001
- Publication place: United States
- Media type: Print (Paperback)
- Pages: 168 pp
- ISBN: 1-55583-622-4

Finding H.F. is a 2001 young adult novel by Julia Watts, published by Alyson Books. It won the Lambda Literary Award for Children's/Young Adult fiction that same year. Set in the Deep South, it describes the experience of being a lesbian teen in the Bible Belt.

== Plot summary ==
Abandoned by her teenage mother as a baby, 16-year-old Heavenly Faith (H.F.) Simms has been raised by her loving but deeply conservative Baptist grandmother ('Memaw'). A tomboy and a closeted lesbian, she is an outcast at school in the small rural mining town of Morgan, in southeastern Kentucky. Her best and only friend is Bo, an effeminate gay boy who is the punching bag for the high school football team, as well as for his violent alcoholic father. H.F.'s first lesbian experience comes when the beautiful new girl at school, Wendy Cook, invites her to a sleepover, where they get drunk on wine and make love. The following morning though, Wendy coldly rejects H.F.s advances, breaking her heart. The same day, H.F. discovers a shocking secret about her mother. Unable to cope with the pain in their lives, H.F. and Bo decide to embark on a road trip during spring break across the South, from Kentucky to Florida.
