= Daddy's Roommate =

1990 children's book by Michael Willhoite

- Cover for Daddy's Roommate
- Author: Michael Willhoite
- Language: English
- Genre: Children's Literature
- Publisher: Alyson Books
- Publication date: November 1990
- Publication place: United States
- Media type: Print (Paperback and Clothbound)
- Pages: 30
- ISBN: 1-55583-118-4
- OCLC: 26563465

Daddy's Roommate is a children's book written by Michael Willhoite and published by Alyson Books in 1990. One of the first children's books to address the subject of homosexuality, the story follows a young boy whose divorced father now lives with his life partner. The book's depiction of a gay household has led to its inclusion in many educational programs, and Willhoite's work was awarded a Lambda Literary Award in 1991.

Due to the book's intended audience and the controversial topic of gay relationships, there have been numerous attempts to remove it from schools and libraries. Because of these attempts, it was the second-most challenged book in the United States from 1990 to 1999.

== Summary ==
The main character, who narrates the story, is a young boy whose parents were divorced the previous year. Living separately with both his mother and his father, the boy discovers that his father has a new roommate named Frank. He observes that his father and Frank do many activities together, including working, eating, sleeping, and occasionally even fighting. Additionally, the boy accompanies his father and Frank on multiple excursions, including trips to the zoo, beach, and a baseball game. The boy enjoys when Frank plays with him, cooks for him, and reads to him. When he asks his mother about his dad and his roommate, his mother explains that they are gay. When the boy is confused, his mother elaborates that the boy's dad and Frank partake in many of the same activities that other couples do, and that being gay is just another form of love. The story concludes with the boy's acknowledgement that since all of his parents are happy, he is happy too.

== Genre ==
This is a short picture book recommended for children between 2–8 years old. The illustrations are full-page watercolor paintings, with single-line text below. The book has been credited as having simple language and descriptive artwork that makes it easily accessible for young readers.

== Reception ==
=== Awards ===
Under the Gay Men's Small Press category, Willhoites won a Lambda Literary Analysis award in 1991 following the book's release. Additionally, the book was honored by the Cooperative Children's Book Center's CCBC Choices list of best books in 2009 for its foundational role in gay literature.

=== Reviews ===
During the early 1990s, Daddy's Roommate was added to many public libraries following positive reviews in Publishers Weekly and Booklist. Publishers Weekly praised the book for raising public awareness for the lack of children's literature acknowledging homosexual relationships. Furthermore, both reviews commended the book for its charming and familiar illustrations that enable children to feel comfortable and ask questions about the book. Additionally, the book also received positive reviews from the School Library Journal and the Bulletin of the Center for Children's Books for its addressing and handling of living with two fathers. However, both evaluations noted that the quality of the writing itself was subpar, and that the story lacked depth or intrigue. A critique in Entertainment Weekly by Michele Landsberg echoed a similar sentiment, arguing that the sensitive topics of divorce and re-coupling were treated with relative indifference. Assessing that the book was so "blithe that it could almost be called Dick and Dick," Landsberg compared the book to the Dick and Jane stories that were often critiqued for their depictions of an idealized and stereotypical society.

In his piece "Defending Children's Schooltime Reading: Daddy's Roommate and Heather's Mommies", Patrick Finnessy asserts that Daddy's Roommate belongs in educational environments because it promotes dialogue about topics children might be confused by. Acknowledging that gay and lesbian people exist, Finnessy attests, is not necessarily deeming homosexuality proper so much as it is addressing a reality that children will experience. The book depicts a boy whose three parents all care for and love him, and Finnessy contributes multiple interviews from diverse parents who appreciate the book's loving, safe, and fun household that all children can learn from.

=== Controversy ===
In the decade following the book's publication, it was one of the most challenged books in the country, with the American Library Association listing it as the most contested book in 1993 and 1994. Its prominence as one of the first children's books to illustrate a gay relationships has led to its inclusion in various political and social debates since its publication.

In 1992, the school chancellor of the New York City public school system proposed the Multicultural Children of the Rainbow Curriculum. Two of the suggested reading materials were Daddy's Roommate and Heather Has Two Mommies. When it was publicized that New York City's public schools would be teaching about homosexual relationships, debates broke out on Nightline, Larry King Live, and in The New York Times, demonstrating why it was the most challenged book in America the next two years.

Willhoite has said that he is fond of the book, and he thought that the rest of the public would be as well. That was not the case; he has publicly stated that he has been fighting against the backlash the book has received about not being appropriate for young children. Willhoite states, "People who read it let their imaginations fly away. They see the picture of the two men, and they imagine the next page is going to show one humping the other."

Lon Mabon, an Oregon politician, used Daddy's Roommate and Heather Has Two Mommies in his campaign to amend the state constitution to allow for discrimination against lesbians and gay men. He used the two books as evidence of a militant homosexual agenda that threatened childhood development. However, citizens of Oregon voted to defeat the measure on November 3, 1992.

Daddy's Roommate became a point of discussion during the 2008 US presidential election when it was alleged that Vice-Presidential candidate Sarah Palin had attempted to remove the book from a public library in Wasilla, Alaska. In 1995, then-councilwoman Palin requested that the local library remove the book three separate times. After the librarian refused, Palin fired her, before eventually rehiring her due to public backlash. Fellow councilwoman Laura Chase asked Palin if she had read Daddy's Roommate, and Palin responded that she "didn't need to read that stuff." The McCain-Palin campaign denied Palin's involvement in the case despite witness accounts claiming otherwise.

Other notable attempts to censor the book are listed below:

Year	Location	Description
1992	Bay Ridge (NY) School Board	After receiving complaints from parents, the district elected to remove Daddy's Roommate and Heather Has Two Mommies from its grade-school curriculum. The books had previously been an optional reading choice for first-grade students, but they were deemed age-inappropriate after the school board president reviewed the material.
1992	Gwinnett County (GA) Regional Library	Objectors to the book collaborated in submitting numerous complaints to the local Lake Lanier Regional Library System. Despite residents compiling two petitions with 350 names requesting the book's removal, the library chose to retain it. Following the decision, the challengers requested a review of the book from the library board, prompting the library to remove Daddy's Roommate from open shelves, instead placing it at the circulation desk for visitors who requested the book.
1993	Mercer County (NJ) Library System	Local resident Keith Smith wrote to the Mercer County Library Commission and County Executive Rober Prunetti requesting the removal of the book. Even though a library system review had recommended retaining the book in the children's section, the library was instructed to move Daddy's Roommate into the parenting section, where it currently remains.
1994	Cottage Grove (OR) School System	The book was initially included in Lane County's Head Start program under its anti-bias curriculum. After parents objected to the book's inclusion, it was removed from the school system's libraries and facilities.
1994	Chandler (AZ) Public Library	In attempting to ban the book from the library, challengers professed that the book was an indoctrination of children into a gay lifestyle. The objectors requested that Alfie's Home, a book by Richard A. Cohen that depicted homosexuality as a treatable condition, be included instead. Daddy's Roommate was retained in its current section, and Alfie's Home was also added to the library's collection.
1995	Rutland (VT) Free Library	Local citizen Karol Raiche published an article in the Rutland Herald that challenged the book's inclusion in the children's section at the local library, and questioned the library's policies. Amidst national attention, the library held a public forum concerning the issue. In light of local support, the library board voted to retain the book in its current location, while also creating a new committee to study other library policies surrounding controversial literature.
1998	Brevard County (FL) Library System	Residents objected to the book's equating of homosexual and heterosexual relationships. In particular, the line on page 26 of the book that "Being gay is just one more kind of love" was criticized for promoting a homosexual lifestyle. However, the book was retained in its current location. The same year, a similar situation occurred in Hays, Kansas, where the ultimate decision was also made to retain the book.
1998	Wichita Falls (TX) Public Library	After a local Baptist minister protested the book's inclusion in the public library, a member of the congregation indefinitely checked out all copies of the book. After the story gained national attention, various people donated their personal copies to the library, and the library soon purchased more copies of the book to accommodate for the increase in demand in accordance with its policies. However, residents continued to steal the book from the library, prompting the Wichita Falls City Council to create a policy that enabled library card holders who garnered 300 signatures the ability to relocate certain literature. The ACLU challenged this policy in local courts, and the policy was eventually deemed unconstitutional by U.S. District Court Judge Jerry Buchmeyer, thereby returning the book to the children's section.
2005	Centerville (IN) School District	The newly-elected school board voted to remove the book from the library, as well as ban the book from being accessed on school property.
2023	Miami-Dade County (FL) School District	More than 30 years after the book's publication, Miami-Dade County Public Schools removed the book from school libraries due to its "adult content" and "sexually charged language." The removal was the result of an audit by the school district following the state's passage of the Stop WOKE Act and the Florida Parental Rights in Education Act (commonly referred to as the "Don't Say Gay law").

== About the author ==
Prior to writing Daddy's Roommate, Michael Willhoite served in the Navy where he created drawings of surgeries and medical implants. He then worked as a mural painter, painting murals for the Pentagon and Fort Knox. He was also a cartoonist for the Washington Blade, a gay newspaper. His cartoons have been published in two different collections by Alyson Books.

In the tenth anniversary edition of Daddy's Roommate, an afterword is included by Willhoite reflecting on the book's tumultuous early history. Acknowledging that the book was the target of numerous acts of censorship, including burning, theft, and defacement, Willhoite thanks librarians across the country who "fought like tigers on the book's behalf." Demonstrating pride that the book was "still, triumphantly, what [he] first intended: a mirror in which children of gay parents can see themselves", Willhoite acknowledged that the book has been widely utilized to educate children about gay families and reflects saying, "I'm fond of the book. It's made my reputation."

Willhoite also wrote a sequel, Daddy's Wedding, which was published in 1996. The book features the same characters, and in this installment the boy serves as best man for their commitment ceremony.

== See also ==
- Homosexuality in children's literature
- King & King by Stern Nijland and Linda De Haan depicts the marriage of two male princes.
- Jenny Lives with Eric and Martin by Susanne Bösche features a child that lives with two fathers.
- And Tango Makes Three by Justin Richardson illustrates the story of two male penguins who fell in love at the Central Park Zoo.
