= Elizabeth Slade =

Dame Elizabeth Slade DBE
- Royal coat of arms of the United Kingdom

Justice of the High Court
- In office 9 October 2008 – 12 May 2019

Personal details
- Born: 12 May 1949 (age 77)
- Education: Lady Margaret Hall, Oxford

Dame Elizabeth Ann Slade, DBE (born 12 May 1949), is a retired judge of the High Court of England and Wales.

She was educated at Wycombe Abbey and Lady Margaret Hall, Oxford.

She was called to the bar at Inner Temple in 1972 and became a bencher in 1990. She was made a QC in 1992, recorder from 1998 to 2008, deputy judge of the High Court from 1998 to 2008, and judge of the High Court of Justice (Queen's Bench Division) from 2008 until her retirement in May 2019.
