= Jennifer Belle =

American novelist

- Born: 1968 (age 57–58)
- Education: Bronx High School of Science
- Occupation: Novelist
- Spouse: Andrew Krents (m. 2002)

Jennifer Belle (born 1968) is an American novelist, based in New York City.

She attended the Bronx High School of Science and dropped out of college. She has also written columns for Ms. magazine. In 1996, she published her first book, Going Down, telling the story of a woman in her 20s, a topic that would appear also in her subsequent writings. In 2002, she married entertainment lawyer Andrew Krents, after they were introduced by fellow novelist Amy Sohn.

Her work has appeared in The New York Times Magazine, The New York Observer, London's The Independent, Cosmopolitan, Harper's Bazaar, Ms., Mudfish.

She teaches at the New York Writers' Workshop.

== Works ==
- Going Down, Riverhead Books, 1996, ISBN 978-1-57322-554-0
- High Maintenance, Riverhead Books, 2001, ISBN 978-1-57322-185-6
- Animal Stackers, Illustrator David McPhail, Hyperion Books for Children, 2005, ISBN 978-0-7868-1834-1
- Little Stalker, Penguin Group, 2008, ISBN 978-1-59448-292-2
- The Seven Year Bitch, Penguin Group USA, 2010, ISBN 978-1-59448-755-2
