= Children of the Rainbow curriculum =

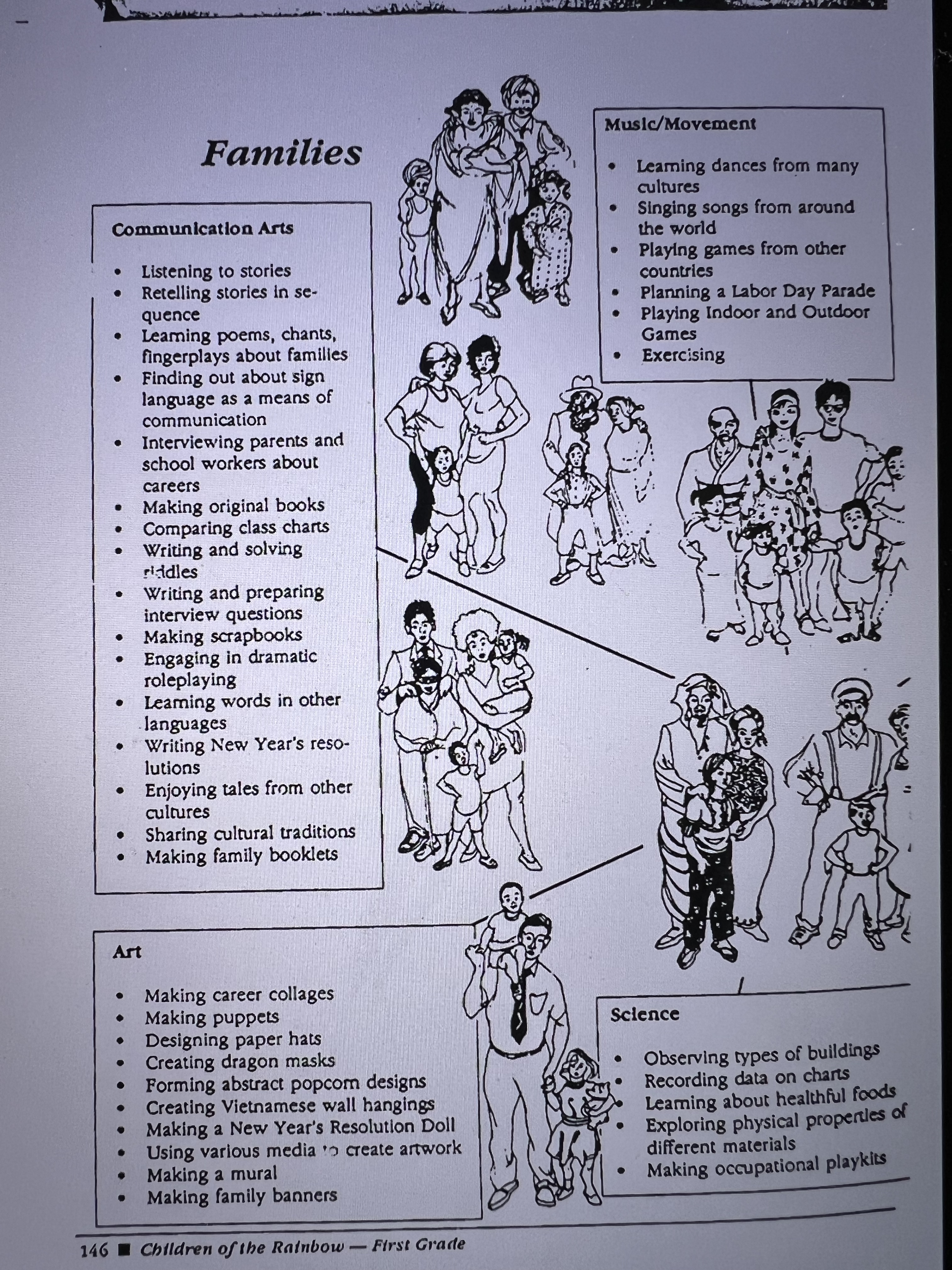
Multicultural Families Illustration including Fostering Tolerance for Lesbian and Gay Family Unit

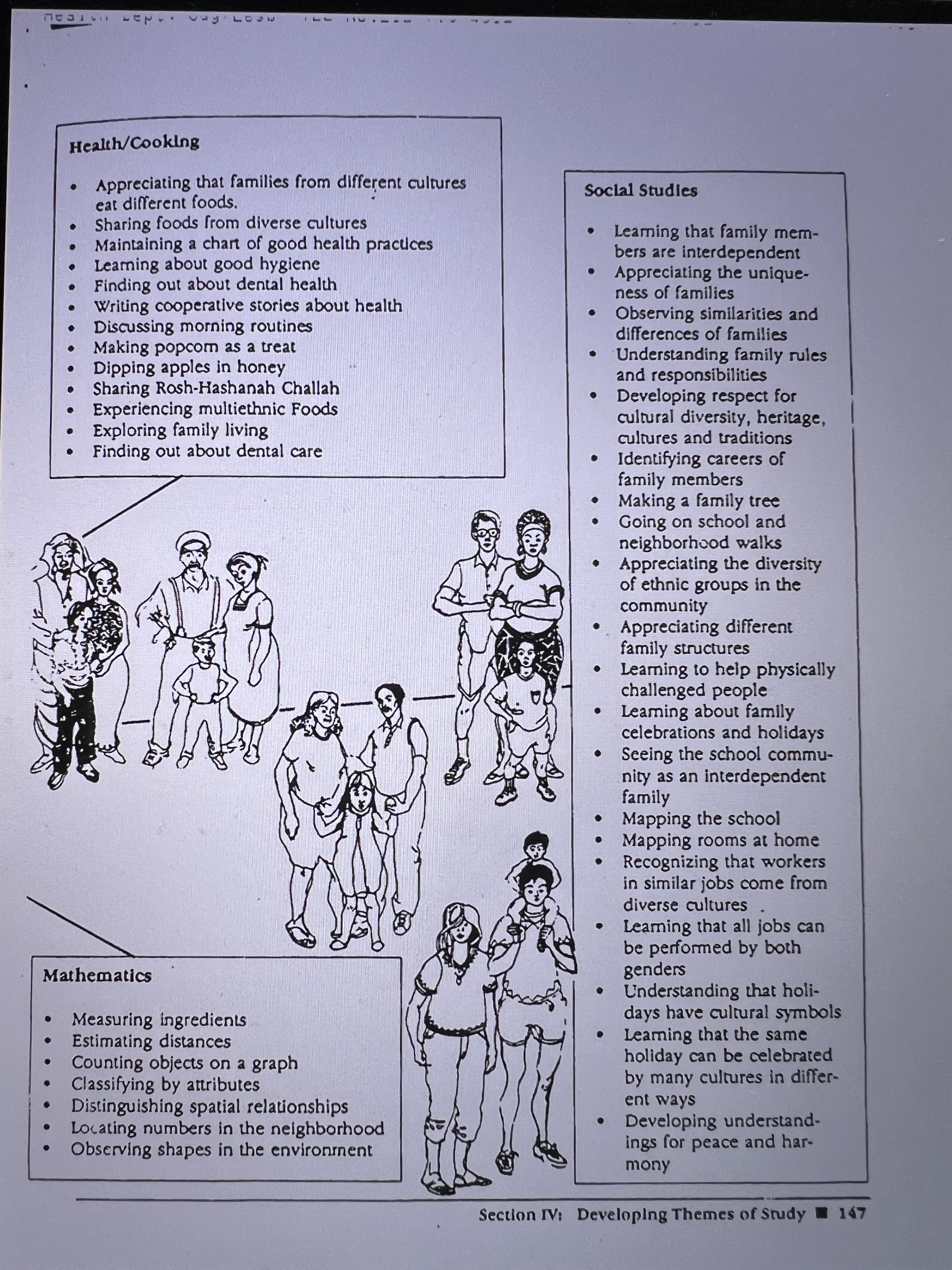
Developing Themes of Study

The Children of the Rainbow Curriculum (also referred to as the Rainbow Curriculum), created in 1991 by the New York City Board of Education was introduced to first-grade teachers to "assist with teaching about multicultural social issues". Its creation was prompted by a number of hate crime incidents that happened in New York City in the late 1980s through early 1990s, such as the murder of Yusef Kirriem Hawkins, Julio Rivera and Jimmy Zappalorti. The lesson plans offered readings, activities, and other lectures that include diverse minority groups.

The Children of the Rainbow Curriculum was a resource guide that contained 443 pages of suggested readings and lessons for teachers to help educate, develop, provide both academic and social skills to students and promote diversity, racial, and ethnic harmony and decrease prejudice and bigotry.

The section on families referencing gay and lesbian-headed households sparked mass criticism from parents, religious groups, and other board members. Opponents of the curriculum argued that it encouraged sex and sodomy to children. After a series of debates and extensive media coverage, the New York City Department of Education voted against the Children of the Rainbow Curriculum.

== History ==
The controversy surrounding the Rainbow Curriculum originated in the late 1980s when gay and lesbian organizations, backed by Mayor David Dinkins, actively advocated for the inclusion of their relationships in the New York City public school system. Their objective was to foster acceptance and, in turn, trigger broader societal transformations. The curriculum Children of the Rainbow was created by Nilda Soto Ruiz the Chief Executive for Instruction of the New York City Board of Education in 1991.

=== Program Overview ===
The Rainbow Curriculum philosophy acknowledges the diversity present in public schools as an opportunity for children to develop positive attitudes and respect towards individuals from different racial, ethnic, religious, cultural, and diverse family backgrounds including tolerance of gay and lesbian families. Developers of the curriculum, inspired by the multicultural diversity of the large number of students who speak more than a hundred different languages with diverse cultural backgrounds within the New York City Public Schools system created "Children of the Rainbow- First Grade," otherwise known as the "Rainbow Curriculum." The curriculum was designed to provide teachers with optional guidance on how to develop suitable learning activities that promote multicultural awareness and foster respect and recognition of diverse groups and individuals. This approach also aimed to support the students development of their personal identity and self-esteem.

In a section of the curriculum "Understanding Family Structures to Meet Children's Needs," the Rainbow Curriculum acknowledges that teachers should be aware that some activities may need to be modified to accommodate various family situations. This included consideration of many different family structures, such as single-parent households, blended families, same-sex parent households and others, and modifying classroom activities accordingly to ensure that all students feel included and represented. An example from the curriculum; "a child being raised by a single mother or by lesbian co-parents may not have a male figure to relate to during Father's Day celebrations." Teachers who are aware of the various family situations that may be present in their classroom can better understand the needs and experiences of their students to create an inclusive and supportive learning environment for all.

In the subsection "Fostering Positive Attitudes Toward Sexuality" the Rainbow Curriculum encourages educators to be inclusive of all family structures and sexual orientations in their teaching. They suggest that teachers should avoid exclusionary practices and stereotypes by including references to lesbians/gay people in all curricular areas and avoiding presumptions about a person's sexual orientation. Teachers are advised that language that reinforces the notion of "otherness" towards lesbian/gay people should also be avoided.

The Rainbow Curriculum aims for teachers to teach each child effectively, essentially by recognizing that children with lesbian/gay parents may have limited exposure to opposite-gendered parental situations. Children without any representation of their family structure in the classroom, they may feel singled out as different. Similarly, children from heterosexual families who have not encountered lesbian/gay individuals before, may be exposed to this for the first time. The Rainbow Curriculum argues that educators have the potential to increase tolerance and decrease hate crimes against the lesbian/gay community if teachers discussed the consequences that children suffer because of homophobia in society.

== Response From The Public ==
=== School Board Committees ===
On September 4, 1992, Mary Cummins, the President of Community School Board 24 in Middle Village, New York, spoke to Parents of School District 24 to voice her opposition to the Rainbow Curriculum. According to the letter Mary Cummins wrote to parents, "this curriculum would have teachers telling their first-graders that gay/lesbian couples are "family" just like any other family unit." Mary Cummins' letter expresses a strong negative opinion towards diversity representation of same-sex family structures, as she stated, "we will not accept two people of the same sex engaged in deviant sex practices as a 'family'."

Cummins' letter of disapproval on the Rainbow Curriculum impacted other NYC school districts to reject the newly approved Department of Education multicultural "Children of the Rainbow Curriculum - first grade" guide; District 31 in Staten Island, District 20 and 21 in Brooklyn, District 12 in the Bronx and District 24 in Queens. Only District 24 rejected the entire curriculum, while the other school districts rejected the mentions about homosexuality.

The Curriculum led to it becoming a school board election issue in March 1993 after the ouster of Chancellor Joseph Fernandez. It essentially became a referendum on how the NYC Board of Education dictates its mandate for local school boards. Those who opposed the curriculum also felt that legislators and regulators equally overstep their positions within their respective offices. Eventually, this gave rise to the Parental Rights Movement to which right-wing politicians saw as a potential support demographic. Although the books mentioning homosexuality were not required, the censored books began to be scrutinized by politicians as something potentially damaging to a child's psyche.

=== Community Committees ===
On September 22, 1992, the Education Coalition on Lesbian and Gay Youth (ECOLaGY) sponsored a community meeting in NYC to respond to the five school district's that "rejected" the new Rainbow Curriculum because it "included lesbian and gay families." The community forum met to discuss that opposition to the inclusion of lesbian and gay families in the curriculum is rooted in "homophobia" and is a critical issue of discrimination which must be addressed in order to promote awareness, understanding, tolerance and inclusivity of the LGBTQ+ community.

==== Banned Books ====
Teachers are required to raise awareness that sexual orientation exists, although they are not required to discuss the topic of sex among individuals who identify as LGBTQ+. The Rainbow Curriculum guide included a bibliography of suggested readings that included two books, Daddy's Roommate and Heather Has Two Mommies, which portray gay and lesbian family households, however, teachers were not obliged to use the books. The picture books depict same-sex relationships in a positive light, portraying them as loving and strong, much like school books that portray heterosexual families in a positive manner. Opponents of the Rainbow Curriculum argued that portraying gay parenthood in a positive manner goes beyond mere tolerance and implies approval for something they do not approve of.

=== Response from Politicians ===
Jesse Helms, former Senator of North Carolina and the Senate were criticized for the proposed and "quietly passed" amendment to stop federal funds to any school system that takes action in matters interpreted as "encouraging or supporting homosexuality as a positive life style alternative," as reported in the article "Congress Teaches Another Lesson in Bias" by Gabriel Botello. A similar amendment was also quietly passed by the House of Representatives earlier that year, to which both amendments were combined into one by a conference of House and Senate representatives. A Senate measure was voted in favor of States' rights with a margin of 63 to 36 for Congress to enforce a national standard for schools of any district, to not discuss certain issues pertaining to sexuality in education, a decision argued to be biased more likely than not against the LGBTQ+ community. According to critics, the vote acted to push further against Congress being bias against LGBTQ+ issues because it included a clause that prohibits schools from offering counseling and support to LGBTQ+ youth who are experiencing suicidal thoughts or engaging in unsafe sexual behavior, and also bars schools from referring these young people to organizations that support and affirm LGBTQ+ lifestyles like New York's Hetrick-Martin Institute.

=== Response from Educators ===
As a concerned educator at P.S.199Q in 1991, Daniel P. Dromm supported the Rainbow Curriculum. He took persistent action to raise awareness to the Chancellor of the New York City Department of Education regarding issues of increased crimes against the LGBTQ+ community in New York City and urged direction needed to be taken by the board. He believed the lack of curriculum in schools was a factor in the spike of "the menace of lesbian and gay bias crimes'' and that there was a need to implement "education" as a means "to solve the problem of homophobia." Kimberly Kreicker, a Lesbian teacher in the same school district as Daniel Dromm, worked with the Q-GLU Organization in advocating for the curriculum. Dromm and Kreicker both received support from the United Federation of Teachers. Chancellor Fernandez also attempted to revise the curriculum even as far to say that inclusion of gays and lesbians is not needed in all topics. However, this was not enough to mollify his critics; his contract was not renewed by the Board of Education by a 4-3 vote.

== Anti-LGBTQ Curricula Efforts in the U.S. ==
Robert Simonds, an Evangelical Christian and a former minister, believed in the literal interpretation of the Bible and is a contributor to educational leadership dedicated to restoring Christian values in the public schools. He founded Citizens for Excellence in Education in 1983 as a spin off of his other organization, the National Association of Christian Educators. In 1985, Simonds published a 65-page booklet titled, How to Elect Christians to Public Office, which urged Christians to run for school board elections to take back control of school curriculums. AIDS education, Simonds said, should take place no earlier than middle school, and it should "emphasize prevention through monogamous, heterosexual sexual activity within marriage… Homosexuality should not be taught as an acceptable and normal lifestyle."

Mary Cummins who led the District 24 School Board resistance to the Children of the Rainbow Curriculum emphasized that the curriculum taught about sodomy and stigmatizing virginity. She was also against the teaching of AIDS prevention and condom education. Cummins felt that young children would not know about sexuality, let alone homosexuality all together. Cummins was also socially conservative, believing that homosexuality was not an acceptable lifestyle.

== Activism and LGBTQ+ Education in New York City ==
The Anti-Violence Project (formerly the New York City Gay and Lesbian Anti-Violence Project; AVP) and Queens Gays and Lesbians United (Q-GLU) organized the March for Truth in April 1993 along Myrtle Avenue in Ridgewood, Queens (District 24) to challenge the homophobic reaction to the "Children of the Rainbow" curriculum. Many individuals, including gay and lesbians, marched at the event to show their support in condemning anti-gay and lesbian violence. Activists distributed educational flyers to clarify the facts and dispel the fiction surrounding the debate over the appropriate timing and approach to discussing gay/lesbian families at home and in school. People who participated in the march did so with the hope to raise respect and tolerance not just for the LGBTQ+ community but all people. Their flyer "Why the Hate" also reported; statistics on the rising number of Anti-Gay/Lesbian Bias Crimes in NYC from 1987-1992.
