= Girlfriends (magazine) =

American lesbian magazine

- 2003 cover with Missy Giove
- Frequency: Monthly
- Publisher: Half Moon Bay
- Founded: 1993
- Final issue: 2006
- Based in: San Francisco, California, U.S.
- ISSN: 1078-8875
- OCLC: 31216302

Girlfriends was a women's magazine that provided critical coverage of culture, entertainment, and world events from a lesbian perspective. It was founded by five women Jacob and Diane Anderson-Minshall, Heather Findlay, Bonnie Simon and Zannah Noe. It also offered relationship, health and travel advice. Published monthly from San Francisco since 1993, it was distributed nationwide by Disticor. It had the same publisher as lesbian erotica magazine On Our Backs, but distanced itself from its pornographic counterpart by refusing to carry sexual ads. Girlfriends magazine ceased publication in 2006.

One of the major features of the magazine was its annual list on the best cities for a lesbian to live in, which it began publishing in 1994. The magazine also ran an online personals service through its website while it was still in operation.

== See also ==
- LGBT culture in San Francisco
