= Revolutionary Voices =

2000 anthology edited by Amy Sonnie

Revolutionary Voices: A Multicultural Queer Youth Anthology
- Author: Amy Sonnie (editor)
- Language: English
- Genre: Anthology
- Publisher: Alyson Publications
- Publication date: 2000
- Publication place: United States
- Media type: Hardcover
- ISBN: 1-55583-558-9

Revolutionary Voices: A Multicultural Queer Youth Anthology, edited by Amy Sonnie, is an anthology created by and for radical queer youth, committed specifically to youth of color, young women, transgender and bisexual youth, (dis)abled youth, and poor/working class youth.

The anthology gave rise to the founding of RESYST (Resources for Youth, Students, and Trainers), a radical queer youth organization that had chapters across the country.

It was published in 2000 by Alyson Publications and was a finalist in two categories for a Lambda Literary Award.

== Background ==
Revolutionary Voices is an anthology created by and for radical queer youth. It was published in 2000 by Alyson Publications and was a finalist in two categories for a Lambda Literary Award. It is committed specifically to youth of color, young women, transgender and bisexual youth, (dis)abled youth, and poor/working class youth. Due to its content, the book has engendered several controversies, discussed below.

The anthology gave rise to the founding of RESYST (Resources for Youth, Students, and Trainers), a radical queer youth organization that had chapters across the US.

== Impact ==
The anthology introduced a host of radical young writers and artists, many of whom continue to publish, create, and receive critical attention. Many of the contributors to Revolutionary Voices were students of Jordan's Poetry for the People project, and all could be said to share the sentiment of Margot Kelley Rodriguez, the author of the collection's foreword, when she writes, "Revolutionary Voices is a call to action. ... Because this is truth, raw and real and in your face. It may be harsh, but that is what truth is, and these artists have taken the leap to write it down. ... We dedicate this book to us, to all of us, wherever we are; so we may continue to speak our minds and hearts, to struggle to save ourselves, and in doing so to save each other."

== Controversies ==
The book has been called child pornography. A former township committeewoman who was seeking to get the book removed from local libraries called it "pervasively vulgar, obscene, and inappropriate" and said that it includes an illustration of Boy Scouts and men having sex.

An article by the Christian right organization Mission America claimed that PFLAG, in recommending the book, was attempting to "encourage children to be self-indulgent and self-centered in every aspect of life; to reject the wisdom of parents and other authorities if they wish even at early ages; and to engage in just about any sexual behavior imaginable."

The ACLU Foundation of Texas reports that the collection was "banned" by the Texas Youth Commission because the book is “not consistent with the educational goals of the State and TYC" and would cause “inappropriate behavior by the students.”

In April 2010, the Burlington County Library System in Southern New Jersey removed this book. In May 2010, the Rancocas Valley Regional High School Board of Education, also in Burlington County, voted to remove the book from its high school library shelves after protests from a local 9-12 Project group.

In response to the book's removal in both the Burlington County Library System and the Rancocas Valley Regional High School library, a group of young theatre artists began a series of theatrical readings in several locations around New Jersey and New York. The theatrical reading project is entitled Revolutionary Readings and is under the direction of Brandon Monokian and dramaturged by Victoria Fear, both graduates of Montclair State University.
