= Cary Leibowitz =

American visual artist

- Born: 1963 (age 62–63)
- Movement: Abject Art

Cary Leibowitz, also sometimes known as Candy Ass (born 1963), is an American visual artist. Leibowitz's work can be found in the permanent collection of the Chase Manhattan Bank, the Hirshhorn Museum, The Jewish Museum, and the Peter and Eileen Norton Collection. Leibowitz's work was the subject of a career survey at the Contemporary Jewish Museum, San Francisco in January 2017.
