= Nicholas Boothman =

English author and speaker

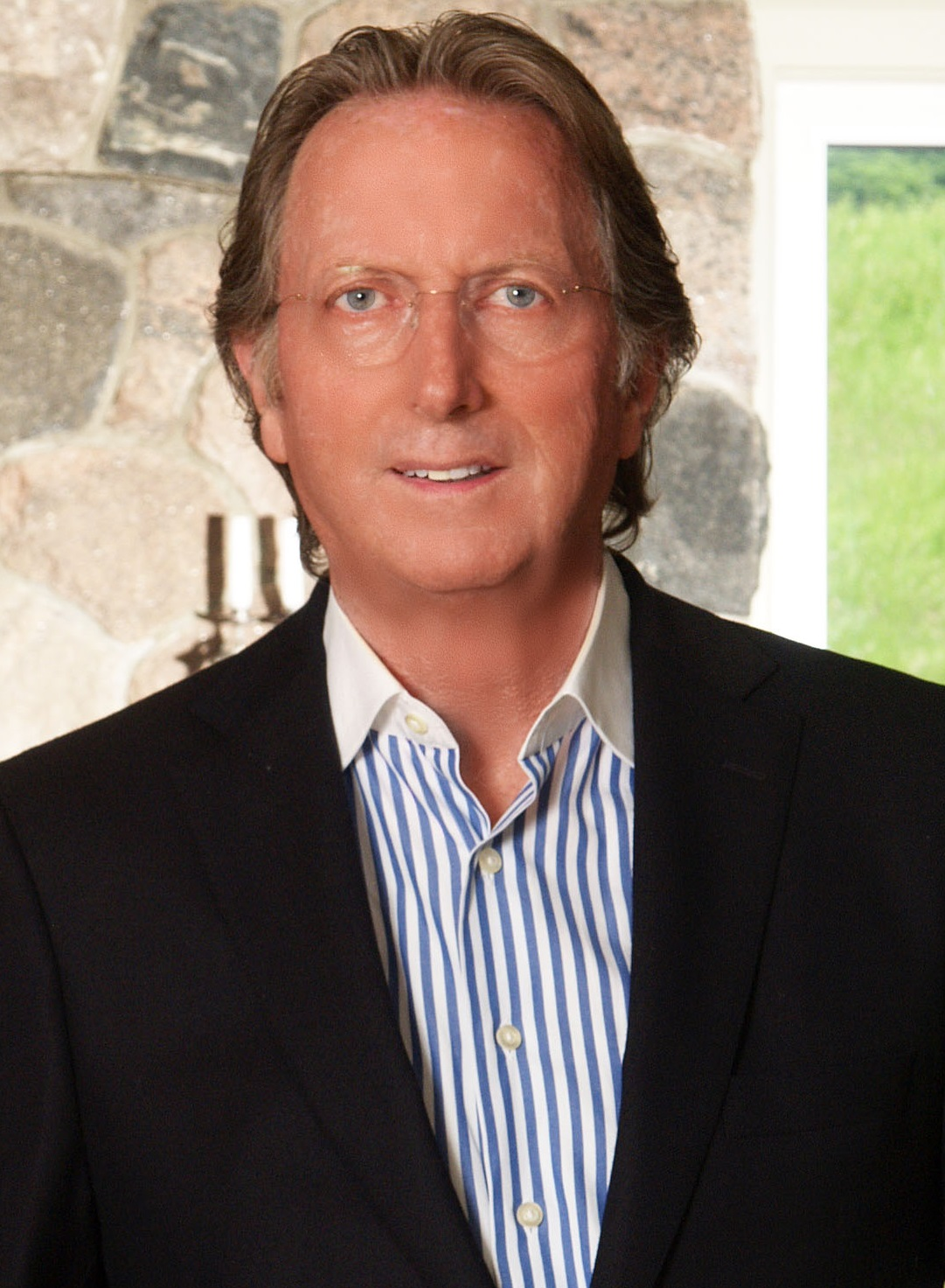
- Born: 1946 (age 79–80); England
- Occupations: Author, speaker
- Website: nicholasboothman.com

Nicholas Boothman is an English author and speaker living in Toronto.

In 1982, Boothman started Corporate Images, an advertising company. Later, he started Persuasion Technology Group. After a 25-year career in fashion and advertising photography, Boothman switched careers and became a promoter of neurolinguistic programming, a controversial technique that the National Academy of Sciences concluded is lacking in terms of a scientific basis.

In 1999, he wrote his first book titled How to Make People Like You in 90 Seconds on Less. Publishers Weekly reviewed the book.

Boothman's 2004 book How to Make Someone Fall in Love With You in 90 Minutes or Less was published by Workman Publishing Company.

In 2010, he published a book titled Convince Them in 90 Seconds or Less: Make Instant Connections That Pay Off in Business and in Life.

== Bibliography ==
- How to Make People Like You in 90 Seconds or Less (2000) ISBN 978-0761149460
- How to Connect in Business in 90 Seconds or Less (2002) ISBN 978-1593160753
- How to Make Someone Fall in Love With You in 90 Minutes or Less (2004) ISBN 978-0761151623
- Convince Them in 90 Seconds or Less: Make Instant Connections That Pay Off in Business and in Life (2010) ISBN 978-0761158554
