= Proposed bans of LGBTQ-themed books in the United States =

Proposed bans of LGBTQ-themed books in the United States is a list of books dealing with LGBTQ issues that have been proposed to be removed or otherwise restricted from public access in the United States, typically from a library or a school curriculum.

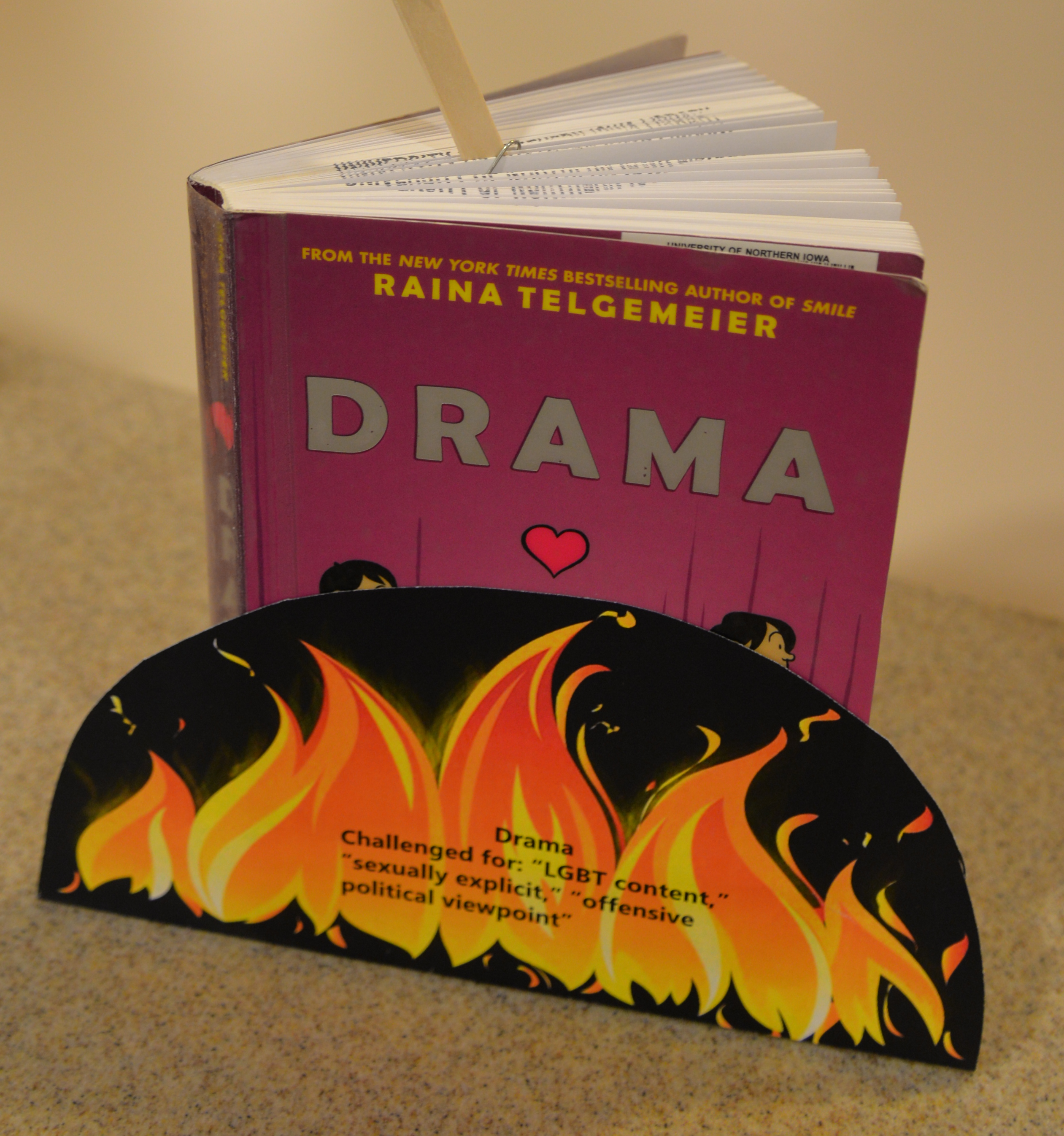
Drama by Raina Telgemeier with an image of fire over the cover art to protest book bans. It is one of the books challenged for LGBTQ content.

== Books challenged for LGBTQ content ==
Organized by year(s) challenged.

=== 2002 ===
- Alice (Series), by Phyllis Reynolds Naylor

=== 2003 ===
- It's Perfectly Normal, by Robie Harris
- King & King, by Stern Nijland and Linda De Haan

=== 2004 ===
- The Perks of Being a Wallflower, by Stephen Chbosky
- King & King, by Stern Nijland and Linda De Haan
- I Know Why the Caged Bird Sings, by Maya Angelou

=== 2005 ===
- It's Perfectly Normal, by Robie Harris

=== 2006 ===
- And Tango Makes Three, by Peter Parnell, Justin Richardson and illustrated by Henry Cole
- Gossip Girl (series), by Cecily Von Ziegesar

=== 2007 ===
- And Tango Makes Three, by Peter Parnell, Justin Richardson and illustrated by Henry Cole
- The Color Purple, by Alice Walker
- The Perks of Being a Wallflower, by Stephen Chbosky

=== 2008 ===
- And Tango Makes Three, by Peter Parnell, Justin Richardson and illustrated by Henry Cole
- The Perks of Being a Wallflower, by Stephen Chbosky
- Uncle Bobby's Wedding, by Sarah S. Brannen

=== 2009 ===
- And Tango Makes Three, by Peter Parnell, Justin Richardson and illustrated by Henry Cole
- The Perks of Being a Wallflower, by Stephen Chbosky
- My Sister's Keeper (novel), by Jodi Picoult

=== 2010 ===
- And Tango Makes Three, by Peter Parnell, Justin Richardson and illustrated by Henry Cole
- Revolutionary Voices, edited by Amy Sonnie

=== 2012 ===
- And Tango Makes Three, by Peter Parnell, Justin Richardson and illustrated by Henry Cole
- The Kite Runner, by Khaled Hosseini

=== 2013 ===
- The Perks of Being a Wallflower, by Stephen Chbosky

=== 2014 ===
- And Tango Makes Three, by Peter Parnell, Justin Richardson and illustrated by Henry Cole
- The Perks of Being a Wallflower, by Stephen Chbosky

=== 2015 ===
- I Am Jazz, by Jessica Herthel and Jazz Jennings
- Beyond Magenta: Transgender Teens Speak Out, by Susan Kuklin
- This Book Is Gay, by Juno Dawson and illustrated by Spike Gerrell
- Two Boys Kissing, by David Levithan

=== 2016 ===
- This One Summer, by Mariko Tamaki and illustrated by Jillian Tamaki
- Drama, written and illustrated by Raina Telgemeier
- Melissa, by Alex Gino
- I Am Jazz, by Jessica Herthel and Jazz Jennings
- Beyond Magenta: Transgender Teens Speak Out, by Susan Kuklin
- Two Boys Kissing, by David Levithan

=== 2017 ===
- Drama, written and illustrated by Raina Telgemeier
- Melissa, by Alex Gino
- And Tango Makes Three, by Peter Parnell, Justin Richardson and illustrated by Henry Cole
- I Am Jazz, by Jessica Herthel and Jazz Jennings

=== 2018 ===
- Melissa, by Alex Gino
- A Day in the Life of Marlon Bundo, by Jill Twiss and illustrated by Gerald Kelly
- Captain Underpants (series), written and illustrated by Dav Pilkey
- Drama, written and illustrated by Raina Telgemeier
- This Day in June, by Gayle E. Pitman and illustrated by Kristyna Litten
- Two Boys Kissing, by David Levithan

=== 2019 ===
- Melissa, by Alex Gino
- Beyond Magenta: Transgender Teens Speak Out, by Susan Kuklin
- A Day in the Life of Marlon Bundo, by Jill Twiss and illustrated by Gerald Kelly
- Sex is a Funny Word, by Cory Silverberg and illustrated by Fiona Smyth
- Prince & Knight, by Daniel Haack and illustrated by Steve Lewis
- I Am Jazz, by Jessica Herthel and Jazz Jennings
- Drama, written and illustrated by Raina Telgemeier
- And Tango Makes Three, by Peter Parnell, Justin Richardson and illustrated by Henry Cole

=== 2020 ===
- Melissa, by Alex Gino

=== 2021 ===
- Flamer, by Mike Curato
- Gender Queer: A Memoir, by Maia Kobabe
- Lawn Boy, by Jonathan Evison
- All Boys Aren't Blue, by George M. Johnson
- This Book is Gay, by Juno Dawson
- Beyond Magenta, by Susan Kuklin

=== 2022 ===
- Gender Queer: A Memoir, by Maia Kobabe
- All Boys Aren't Blue, by George M. Johnson
- Flamer, by Mike Curato
- Looking for Alaska by John Green
- The Perks of Being a Wallflower, by Stephen Chbosky
- Lawn Boy, by Jonathan Evison
- This Book is Gay, by Juno Dawson

=== 2023 ===
- Call Me by Your Name, by André Aciman
- The Family Book, by Todd Parr
- Heartstopper, by Alice Oseman
- On Earth We're Briefly Gorgeous, by Ocean Vuong
- The Upside of Unrequited, by Becky Albertalli
- Gender Queer: A Memoir, by Maia Kobabe
- All Boys Aren't Blue, by George M. Johnson
- This Book is Gay, by Juno Dawson
- The Perks of Being a Wallflower, by Stephen Chbosky
- Flamer, by Mike Curato
- Tricks by Ellen Hopkins
- Let's Talk About It, by Erika Moen and Matthew Nolan

=== 2024 ===
- All Boys Aren't Blue, by George M. Johnson
- Hani and Ishu's Guide to Fake Dating, by Adiba Jaigirdar
- Gender Queer: A Memoir, by Maia Kobabe
- The Perks of Being a Wallflower, by Stephen Chbosky
- Flamer, by Mike Curato
- A Queer History of the United States for Young People, by Michael Bronski
- The Lesbiana's Guide to Catholic School, by Sonora Reyes
- It Gets Better: Coming Out, Overcoming Bullying, and Creating a Life Worth Living by Dan Savage

=== 2025 ===
According to the American Library Association, of the 4,235 titles challenged in 2025, 39% of those works "represented the lived experiences of LGBTQIA+ people and people of color."

- Gender Queer: A Memoir, by Maia Kobabe
- The Perks of Being a Wallflower, by Stephen Chbosky
- Last Night at the Telegraph Club, by Malinda Lo
- Tricks, by Ellen Hopkins
- Looking for Alaska, by John Green

== Legislation efforts by year ==
=== 1996 ===
==== Florida ====
In September 1996, a local chapter of the national Parents, Families and Friends of Lesbians and Gays (PFLAG) created a display in the West Hernando/Staffordene T. Foggia branch library. The branch is part of the Hernando County Florida Library System. Authors such as Alexander the Great, Gertrude Stein and Walt Whitman were among the gay and lesbian authors that were included in the display. Books by the authors and red ribbons were displayed, along with a poster detailing the contributions of the authors to literature.

The community quickly responded. Hernando County offices and the library system received phone calls and letters. Responses were both positive and negative. Assistant County Attorney Bill Buztrey informed county commissioners that removing the display could be considered a violation of the First Amendment to the United States Constitution. This would leave the county open to a lawsuit. Laurel Solomon was the Library Services Director at that time. She issued a written statements that going forward, all displays would be "created and sponsored by the library itself... to promote library-related activities." County commissioners stated that this would protect them from "the potential of non-sanctioned radical groups such as Nazis" from creating their own displays.

The Florida Library Association awarded Buztrey and two other county staff members with the Intellectual Freedom Award for invoking the First Amendment. Local columnist Jan Gildewell wrote that the policy "indicates to me that reception of intellectual freedom awards is no guarantee of continued freedom--or intellect."

=== 2005 ===
==== Alabama ====
Republican lawmaker Gerald Allen proposed Alabama House Bill 30 (HB30), which would have banned public school libraries from purchasing books by gay authors or with gay characters. The bill did not become law.

==== Arkansas ====
A proposed ban in Arkansas would have barred any representation of gay and lesbian people in schools, libraries, and state-funded universities. It passed the state's lower house, but a tie vote in the state senate's Education Committee failed to bring it to the state senate floor.

==== Oklahoma ====
State Rep. Sally Kern, a Republican from Oklahoma City, supported House Resolution 1039, which would have required Oklahoma libraries to "confine homosexually themed books and other age-inappropriate material to areas exclusively for adult access and distribution." The bill also required that no public funds be used in "the distribution of such materials to children." The bill passed in the house but not the senate.

=== 2023 ===
==== Florida ====
The Parental Rights in Education law, alternatively and unofficially as the Don't Say Gay law. The law restricts education about gender identity and sexual orientation for K-3 students.

=== 2026 ===
In February 2026, Rep. Mary Miller (R-IL) introduced H.R. 7661 amending the Elementary and Secondary Education Act of 1965, banning the use of federal funds to "develop, implement, facilitate, host, or promote any program or activity for, or to provide or promote literature or other materials to, children under the age of 18 that includes sexually oriented material, and for other purposes." Also known as the Stop the Sexualization of Children Act, the bill would keep public schools from stocking or teaching LGBTQ+ literature.

== See also ==
- Book banning in the United States (2021–present)
- Book censorship in the United States
- List of most commonly challenged books in the United States
- List of books banned by governments
- Homosexuality in children's literature
- Lesbian teen fiction
- Gay male teen fiction
- List of LGBTQ characters in modern written fiction
- Transphobia in the United States
