= Roy and Silo =

Homosexual penguin couple

- Species: Chinstrap penguin
- Sex: Both male
- Hatched: 1987 (Roy and Silo)
- Known for: Same sex animal couple
- Offspring: Tango

Roy and Silo (hatched 1987) were two male chinstrap penguins in New York City's Central Park Zoo. They were noted by staff at the zoo in 1998 to be performing mating rituals, and, in 1999, one of them attempted to hatch a rock as if it were an egg. This inspired zookeepers to give them an egg from a pair of penguins which could not hatch it, resulting in both of them raising a chick that was named Tango.

Tango herself was viewed in a similar situation with another female penguin. Roy and Silo drifted apart after several years, and in 2005, Silo paired with a female penguin called Scrappy. Roy and Silo's story has been made into a children's book and featured in a play. The practice of allowing pairs of male penguin couples to adopt eggs has been repeated in other zoos around the world. Both Tango and Roy have since died.

== History ==
Roy and Silo met at the zoo, and they began their relationship in 1998. They were observed conducting mating rituals typical of their species including entwining their necks and mating calls. In 1999, the pair were observed trying to hatch a rock as if it were an egg. They also attempted to steal eggs from other penguin couples. When the zoo staff realized that Roy and Silo were both male, they tested them further by replacing the rock with a dummy egg made of stone and plaster. As it was "incubated real well", it occurred to the zookeepers to give them the second egg of a penguin couple, which had previously been unable to successfully hatch two eggs at a time. Roy and Silo incubated the egg for 34 days and spent two and a half months raising the healthy young chick, a female named "Tango". When she reached breeding age, Tango paired with another female penguin called Tanuzi. As of 2005, the two had paired for two mating seasons.

Shortly after their story broke in the press, Roy and Silo began to separate after a more aggressive pair of penguins forced them out of their nest. In 2005, Silo found another partner, a female called Scrappy, which had been brought from SeaWorld Orlando in 2002. Both Tango and Roy have since died.

== Impact ==
Roy and Silo were not the first same-sex male penguin couple to be known in New York, as a pairing of two penguins named Wendell and Cass at New York Aquarium was reported in 2002. However, attention was first brought to Roy and Silo after The New York Times published a story about them in May 2004. The article described them as "gay penguins", and listed two other pairs of penguins in New York that showed similar behavior. Roy and Silo's story became the basis for two children's books, And Tango Makes Three, by Justin Richardson and Peter Parnell and illustrated by Henry Cole, and the German-language Zwei Papas für Tango (Two Daddies for Tango) by Edith Schrieber-Wicke and Carola Holland. And Tango Makes Three itself became controversial, being listed as one of the top ten most challenged books in public libraries and schools across America for five years in a row, but became a bestseller. Roy and Silo have also been featured as characters in theatrical works, including the play Birds of a Feather, a character-driven piece about both gay and straight relationships, which made its début in Fairfax, Virginia in July 2011. And Then Came Tango, a play/ballet for young audiences by Emily Freeman, was premiered during the March 2011 Cohen New Works Festival at The University of Texas at Austin. The Austin Chronicle recognized the production with an Honorable Mention in its "Top 10 Theatrical Wonders of 2011."

The breakup of the pair was well-received by certain groups. Warren Throckmorton said through the Christian right organization Focus on the Family: "For those who have pointed to Roy and Silo as models for us all, these developments must be disappointing. Some gay activists might actually be angry." A spokesperson for the National Gay and Lesbian Task Force responded by explaining that the actions of two penguins is not a good way of answering the question of whether sexual orientation is a choice or inborn. A 2010 study by France's Centre for Functional and Evolutionary Ecology found that homosexual pairings in penguins is widespread, but such pairings do not usually last more than a few years.

The publicity on the subject caused public outcry among gay and lesbian communities when stories were published about zoo keepers forcibly splitting up same-sex penguin couples. Dwindling numbers of some species of penguins contributed to those decisions. The act of allowing a same-sex pair of penguins to adopt either an egg or a chick in the same manner as Roy and Silo has been repeated more than once. In 2009, German zookeepers gave an egg to a male same-sex pair of Humboldt penguins named Z and Vielpunkt, which hatched the egg and raised the chick. In 2011, Chinese zookeepers gave a chick to a male same-sex pair of penguins to look after once it became apparent that the chick's natural parents could not look after two chicks. In 2018, Sealife Sydney in Australia saw two male Gentoo penguins successfully hatch an egg, after they were observed with a dummy egg. In 2020, they hatched a second egg, and their first chick also had her own chick. The Central Park Zoo has had other same-sex couples, with both an all-male couple (named Squawk and Milo) and an all-female couple (named Georgey and Mickey) conducting courtship behavior. In 2014, zookeepers at Wingham Wildlife Park, in Kent, UK, gave an egg that had been abandoned by its mother, after the father refused to help incubate it, to a Humboldt penguin male same-sex pair called Jumbs and Kermit. The park owner stated in a BBC interview, "These two have so far proven to be two of the best penguin parents we have had yet."

== See also ==
- List of individual birds
- Sphen and Magic
- Homosexual behavior in penguins
- List of animals displaying homosexual behavior
