= You Can't Say That! =

2021 non-fiction book edited by Leonard S. Marcus

You Can’t Say That! Writers for Young People Talk About Censorship, Free Expression, and the Stories They Have to Tell
- Author: Leonard S. Marcus
- Genre: Young adult non-fiction
- Publisher: Candlewick Press
- Publication date: September 16, 2021
- ISBN: 9780763690366

You Can’t Say That! Writers for Young People Talk About Censorship, Free Expression, and the Stories They Have to Tell is a 2021 young adult non-fiction book edited by young adult author and literary critic Leonard S. Marcus. The book is a collection of interviews of popular children's and young adult writers about their experiences with book censorship. It was published by Candlewick Press.

== Authors interviewed ==
- Matt de la Peña
- Robie H. Harris
- Susan Kuklin
- David Levithan
- Meg Medina
- Lesléa Newman
- Katherine Paterson
- Dav Pilkey
- Justin Richardson and Peter Parnell
- Sonya Sones
- R. L. Stine
- Angie Thomas

== Critical reception ==
You Can't Say That! received starred reviews from School Library Journal and Publishers Weekly. Publishers Weekly reviewed, "Marcus’s 13 interviews with writers whose works have provoked controversy deliver more than the book’s title suggests".

Kirkus Reviews called it "a calm, cohesive take on a hot-button issue". A review in The Horn Book noted, "Marcus provides welcome context in each author’s work and life as a whole, demonstrating that intellectual freedom is a right that permeates all creative work".

A New York Times review by Suzanne Nossel said, "Marcus’s interviews spotlight what is at stake when books are challenged". The book received a positive review from the Intellectual Freedom Blog of the American Library Association.

== Audio adaptation ==
The audio adaptation of You Can't Say That! was narrated by Tom Parks, Thom Rivera, Janet Metzger, Roxanne Hernandez, Arthur Morey, and Susan Dalian.
