= And Tango Makes Three =

2005 children's book by Peter Parnell and Justin Richardson

- First edition cover of And Tango Makes Three
- Author: Peter Parnell; Justin Richardson
- Illustrator: Henry Cole
- Cover artist: Henry Cole
- Language: English
- Genre: Children's literature
- Publisher: Simon & Schuster Children's Publishing
- Publication date: April 26, 2005
- Publication place: United States
- Media type: Print (hardcover)
- Pages: 32
- ISBN: 0-689-87845-1
- OCLC: 55518633
- Dewey Decimal: [E] 22
- LC Class: PZ10.3.R414 Tan 2005

And Tango Makes Three is a children's book written by Peter Parnell and Justin Richardson and illustrated by Henry Cole which was published in 2005. The book tells of and was based on the true story of Roy and Silo, two male chinstrap penguins who formed a pair bond in New York's Central Park Zoo, and were given an egg by zookeepers which they help hatch. The female chick, that completes their family, is named "Tango" by the zookeepers.

And Tango Makes Three has been mentioned in numerous censorship and culture war debates on same-sex marriage, adoption, and homosexuality in animals. The American Library Association (ALA) reports that And Tango Makes Three was the most frequently challenged book from 2006 to 2010, and the second most frequently challenged in 2009. Ultimately, it became the fourth-most challenged book between 2000 and 2009, as well as the sixth-most challenged book between 2010 and 2019.

And Tango Makes Three has also won multiple awards, including the ALA Notable Children's Book Nominee in 2006, the ASPCA Henry Bergh Book Award in 2005, and was named one of the Bank Street Best Books of the Year in 2006.

Scholars of children's literature and education believe And Tango Makes Three is a good way to introduce the idea of diverse families to children. The book does not take a stance on same-sex marriage, but rather the validity of same-sex families.

== Background ==
The story was inspired by two male penguins, Roy and Silo, at the Central Park Zoo. During mating season, each penguin began pairing with another, and Roy and Silo paired with each other. While reading an article in The New York Times about Roy and Silo's relationship, "Love That Dare Not Squeak Its Name," the couple of Peter Parnell, a playwright and children's book author, and Justin Richardson, a psychiatrist focused on the sexual development of children, decided they wanted to tell the story in the form of a children's picture book. Prior to co-authoring And Tango Makes Three, Richardson co-authored Everything You Never Wanted Your Kids to Know About Sex (but Were Afraid They'd Ask) in 2003 with Mark Schuster. After publishing this resource for parents to discuss sexuality with their children, readers requested a resource on "gay stuff" from Richardson.

Finding that many parents had trouble introducing the concept of homosexuality to their children, the couple thought a book such as And Tango Makes Three would make the conversation easier, and create a more inclusive environment for future generations. When actually working on the book itself, Richardson commented on how the subject material would be interesting to kids as stories about animals are seen as fun. Through writing the book, they wanted to be able to introduce the idea of same-sex relationships to children in a way that would be easy for children to understand.

== Summary ==
The story opens in the Central Park Zoo, a place that houses families of all different kinds. Soon, it is the time of year when all the chinstrap penguins couple up. All of the couples have one female penguin and one male penguin except for Roy and Silo, two male penguins who have fallen in love. They do everything together: they sing, swim, and even build a nest so that they can start a family. The two penguins take turns sitting on a rock, thinking that it is an egg. The zookeeper, Mr. Gramsay, notices this and he brings them an extra egg from another penguin couple who would not be able to care for it. Roy and Silo sit on their egg and take care of it until it hatches. The zookeepers name the female chick Tango. People cheer when they come to visit the zoo and see Tango with her two fathers. The story ends by reiterating that Roy, Silo, and Tango are a happy family and that families can look different.

== Genre ==
And Tango Makes Three is a non-fiction children's picture book intended for children aged three to eight. And Tango Makes Three is similar in style to the other book published by Parnell and Richardson in 2010, Christian, the Hugging Lion. Both books are non-fiction children's picture books about real animals, with Christian, the Hugging Lion telling the story of Christian the lion.

In one challenge relating to the genre of the book, And Tango Makes Three was moved from the children's section to the adult non-fiction section in public libraries in Savannah and St. Joseph, Missouri. This change was made after parents made complaints about the book's placement in the children's picture book section. The change was made to not "blindside" readers.

== Analysis ==
The primary argument for the inclusion of And Tango Makes Three and books like it, ones that strive to introduce children to the subject of homosexuality in an appropriate and accessible way, is to foster inclusivity for children in same sex families. Literary critics have explored the values of And Tango Makes Three mainly because of its use in classrooms. Jennifer Harvey, a Curriculum Librarian and assistant professor at Calvin T. Ryan Library, University of Nebraska at Kearney, wrote that the book's diverse makeup and its subsequent lessons adds to its overall value. Harvey states that "since families vary, literature that explores types of families can improve the chances of the reader having a healthy response to non-normative family units, whether their own, or the family of an acquaintance." The inclusion of two male parents is reflective of a typical upbringing in American culture, and Harvey believes that addressing this is beneficial for a classroom setting. Indeed, she argues in favor of the book because it "can increase the likelihood of compassion for difference." Harvey notes that "Institute of UCLA’s School of Law has estimated that a quarter of all same-sex households include children under eighteen. This distribution suggests that children are likely to be aware of families where the parents are same sex. In the event that they do not encounter a family with same-sex parents, they will likely know children raised in families not made up of the child’s biological parents." She contends that families are becoming more diverse and that books like And Tango Makes Three help introduce the subject to children while also fostering a more accepting generation.

Professionals have included And Tango Makes Three as an example of a book that can make introducing the topic of homosexuality easy for children to understand. Bre Evans Santiago, who holds a PhD in LGBTQ issues, argued for the importance of LGBTQ friendly books. Arguing the idea that when such books are read, a sense of pride will emerge from children with non-traditional families, making them feel more accepted. And Tango Makes Three was frequently cited by Evans-Santiago. She goes on to describe how young students in a classroom she studied enjoyed the book. The penguins had become beloved characters in the classroom, and the children always grew excited when Roy and Silo received their egg. She claimed that prejudice does not run in children, and if we teach children that something such as same-sex parenting exists, they are less likely to hold bias about the subject.

Janine Schall, an instructor of teacher education, and Gloria Kauffman, a fourth and fifth grade teacher, collaborated and conducted an experiment with thirty fourth and fifth graders to explore how much children understand about homosexuality. They found that the majority of the children questioned understood the word "gay" as an insult. They concluded that the introduction to a topic like homosexuality is critical in developing an inclusive environment and recommended including books like And Tango Makes Three in the younger students’ curricula.

Brianna Burke and Kristina Greenfield, professors at Iowa State University, found that And Tango Makes Three can hold a place of value in higher education as well. In their experiment, students read the book and were pushed to engage with what the message of the book was. They were asked questions such as what their idea was of family, and if that idea may be changed or enhanced from the book. When the students discovered the positive message of the book they then were taught about how and why the book has been so contested. This introduction to the children's book, and backlash it received, gives older students a sense of the issues of heteronormativity in the classroom, and how this discussion can help dismantle harmful ideas of heteronormativity. They also went on to say that students would be able to access an "other'd" perspective more easily through the nonthreatening tone of the picture book.

According to Julia Mickenberg and Philip Nel, professors and scholars of children's literature, the focus of the book is on the story of Roy and Silo and not on the underlying message of acceptance of same-sex relationships. By being a fun book for children, it is "threatening to would-be censors."

== Publication ==
And Tango Makes Three was published in 2005 by Simon and Schuster. Originally published in hardcover, the book was published in a tenth anniversary edition as a board book, ebook, and paperback with CD audiobook in 2015. The audiobook was narrated by actor Neil Patrick Harris.

== Reception ==
Reviewers say that the positive takeaway from And Tango Makes Three comes from the idea that it helps spark the conversation "about same-sex partnerships in human society." Selena E. Van Horn, a doctoral candidate in literacy education at the University of Missouri, published a piece titled "'How Do You Have Two Moms?' Challenging Heteronormativity While Sharing LGBTQ-Inclusive Children's Literature" in the National Council of Teachers of English. She suggested And Tango Makes Three as a book to be used to better introduce homosexual acceptance into the classroom. And Tango Makes Three was published in the UK as a result of a study done in the country titled No Outsiders by Dr. Elizabeth Atkinson and Dr. Renee DePalma. Moreover, an article written by Anna Paula Peixoto da Silva recognized that the inclusion of diverse literature and toys that are reflective of both the male and the female gender as well as "various ages and ethnicities" in an elementary school curriculum would be effective for students who have parents of the same gender. One of the age-appropriate books recommended for preschoolers was And Tango Makes Three.

== Challenges ==
Some parents have objected to their kids reading this book because it contains the topic of homosexuality. Homosexuality in animals is seen as controversial by some social conservatives who believe that illustrating animal homosexuality as normal suggests that homosexuality in humans is normal. Others believe that it has no implications and that it is nonsensical to equate animal behavior to that of humans. While many challenges were based on the claim that the topic of homosexuality in animals made the book inappropriate, a random focus group found many adults saying that there was nothing explicitly inappropriate with Roy and Silo's relationship as it is portrayed in the book. Parnell and Richardson noted the positive aspect of increased publicity leading to a larger audience of readers of And Tango Makes Three after it began to be challenged in schools and libraries.

The American Library Association (ALA) tracks challenges and censorship cases made against literature in public schools and libraries. It reports that And Tango Makes Three was the most challenged book of 2006, 2007, and 2008. The book dropped to the second position in 2009 but returned to the top slot in 2010. The book has reappeared in the top ten on the list in 2012, 2014, 2017, and 2019. Ultimately, it became the fourth-most banned book between 2000 and 2009, as well as the sixth-most banned book between 2010 and 2019.

=== Current challenges ===
Currently, Florida is having a great amount of challenges surrounding this children's book. In the middle District of Florida, originally there was a law stating that if an educational system had already purchased content for libraries they should be allowed to keep them. However the laws have changed to either completely removing this book from public school libraries or heavily restricting access. The lawsuit revisions have initiated conversation which has led to division amongst those distributing the books and those trying to obtain them. As of October 2023, the current consensus is to allow the school board to determine whether or not they would want to distribute books like And Tango Makes Three.

Specific instances of challenges
When	Where	Outcome	Notes	Reference(s)
2006	Savannah Missouri public library	Moved	Moved from fiction to non-fiction	
2006	Shiloh, Illinois public schools	Retained		
2007	Lodi, California public library	Retained		
2008	Loudoun County Public Schools	Retained	Removed initially and then retained after discovery that policies had not been followed	
2008	Ankeny, Iowa public schools	Retained		
2009	Bristol primary schools	Removed		
2009	Chico Unified School District	Retained		
2009	Calvert County, Maryland public library	Retained		
2009	Farmington, Minnesota public schools	Retained		
2010	North Kansas City, Missouri public schools	Retained		
2012	Davis, Utah public schools	Removed		
2012	Rochester, Minnesota public schools	Retained	Removed initially and then retained after discovery that policies had not been followed	
2014	Singapore	Moved	Action by the National Library Board removed the book, later moved to the adult section instead of being removed.	
2018	Hong Kong	Removed		
2020	Independence, Kansas public library	Retained		
2023	Lake County (FL) Schools	Removed	Under the auspices of a new state law.	
2023	Escambia County School District	Removed	As above. Also banned were All Boys Aren't Blue by George M. Johnson and When Aidan Became a Brother by Kyle Lukoff. Ruling in United States District Court for the Northern District of Florida in October 2025 found for the district, asserting no First Amendment rights were violated and the book's removal was not a viewpoint-based decision.	

== Awards and nominations ==
=== Awards ===
- American Booksellers Association Book Sense Kid's Picks, Fall 2005
- American Library Association Notable Children's Book, 2005
- ASPCA Henry Bergh Award, 2005
- Bank Street College of Education Best Children's Books of the Year, 2005
- Capitol Choices Committee Capitol Choices, 2006
- Cooperative Children's Book Council Choices, 2006
- Gustavus Myer Outstanding Book Award, 2006
- Kirkus Book Review Stars, 2005
- Nick Jr. Family Magazine Best Book of the Year
- Publishers Weekly Book Review Stars, 2005

=== Nominations ===
- Lambda Literary Award finalist
- Sheffield Children's Book Award, 2008 Shortlist
