= Heavy: An American Memoir =

2018 memoir by Kiese Laymon

- First edition
- Author: Kiese Laymon
- Language: English
- Genre: Memoir
- Publisher: Scribner
- Publication date: October 16, 2018
- Publication place: United States

Heavy: An American Memoir is a memoir by Kiese Laymon, published October 16, 2018 by Scribner. In 2019, the book won the Andrew Carnegie Medal for Excellence in Nonfiction and Los Angeles Times Book Prize, among other awards and nominations.

== Reception ==
Heavy received reviews from Kirkus Reviews, Publishers Weekly, Booklist, NPR, The New York Times Book Review, The Atlantic, Los Angeles Times, The New Republic, San Francisco Chronicle, TIME, Entertainment Weekly, and Library Journal.

In reviews, the book was called "harrowing," "gorgeous," "spectacular," "dynamic," and "unsettling in all the best ways." In her review for Booklist, Anne Bostrom said the book was "[s]o artfully crafted, miraculously personal, and continuously disarming," that it is, "at its essence, powerful writing about the power of writing." Writing for The New York Times, Jennifer Szaili wrote, "This generous, searching book explores all the forces that can stop even the most buoyant hopes from ever leaving the ground.” The Los Angeles Times's Nathan Deuel said, "Heavy is one of the most important and intense books of the year because of the unyielding, profoundly original and utterly heartbreaking way it addresses and undermines expectations for what exactly it’s like to possess and make use of a male black body in America."

The Guardian's Sukhdev Sandhu provided a mixed review, saying "he's best when writing about his own feelings." Sandhu continued, "Laymon's prose can be erratic, lurching between showy 'y'alls' and academese such as 'modes of memory'. There are many sententious and underdeveloped proclamations." Near the end of the book, Sandhu noted that Laymon "sounds merely pompous." Sandhu also found the way the book addressed Laymon's mother using the second-person pronoun "you" to be "[s]trangest of all" the language used in the book, saying, "It comes across as a device, as a contrivance. It promises an intimacy that he never delivers on."

Heavy was named one of the best nonfiction of 2018 by Kirkus Reviews, The New York Times, Publishers Weekly, NPR, BuzzFeed, and Boston Public Library. Library Journal named it one of the best memoirs of the year. Entertainment Weekly and Southern Living included it in their overall list of the best books of the year, and the Chicago Public Library placed it in the top ten books of the year. The New York Times included it in their list of the best 50 memoirs of the past 50 years.

In 2022, Heavy was banned by the Wentzville, Missouri, R-IV School District. Going against the district review committee's recommendation to retain the book in the district's libraries, the Wentzville school board banned Heavy along with The Bluest Eye, by Toni Morrison; All Boys Aren't Blue, by George M. Johnson; Fun Home, by Alison Bechdel; Gabi, a Girl in Pieces, by Isabel Quintero; Invisible Girl, by Lisa Jewell; Lawn Boy, by Jonathan Evison; and Modern Romance: An Investigation, by Aziz Ansari and Eric Klinenberg. The ban prompted a lawsuit (C.K.-W v. Wentzville R-IV School District) filed on behalf of two students in the district supported by the American Civil Liberties Union of Missouri (ACLU of Missouri) along with state and local subdivisions of the NAACP. The lawsuit alleged that the book removals violated students' First Amendment right to access information by engaging in viewpoint-based removal of books.

== Awards ==
Awards and honors for Heavy
Year	Award/Honor	Category	Result	Ref.
2018	Barnes & Noble Discover Great New Writers Award	Nonfiction	Won	
2018	Booklist Editors' Choice	Adult Books	Selection	
2018	Goodreads Choice Award	Memoir & Autobiography	Nominated	
2018	Kirkus Prize	Nonfiction	Finalist	
2019	Andrew Carnegie Medal for Excellence	Nonfiction	Won	
2019	Chautauqua Prize	—	Shortlisted	
2019	Hurston/Wright Legacy Award	Nonfiction	Finalist	
2019	Los Angeles Times Book Prize	Christopher Isherwood Prize for Autobiographical Prose	Won	
2019	RUSA awards	Notable Books of the Year	Selection	
