= All Boys Aren't Blue =

2020 memoir by George M. Johnson

- Author: George M. Johnson
- Cover artist: Charly "Carlos" Palmer
- Genre: Young adult non-fiction
- Publisher: Farrar, Straus and Giroux
- Publication date: 2020
- Media type: Print
- ISBN: 9780374312718
- OCLC: 1246484973
- Dewey Decimal: 306.76/6208996073
- LC Class: HQ76.27.A37 J644 2020
- Website: https://www.fiercereads.com/books/all-boys-arent-blue/

All Boys Aren't Blue is a young adult non-fiction "memoir-manifesto" by journalist and activist George M. Johnson, published April 28, 2020, by Farrar, Straus and Giroux.

The book consists of a series of essays following Johnson's journey growing up as queer Black youth in Plainfield, New Jersey, and Virginia. In addition to describing Johnson's own experience, it directly addresses Black queer boys who may not have someone in their lives with similar experiences. Johnson wanted to break the stigma of discussing tough issues that queer youth face and share their own childhood experiences, which were not well represented in popular media, with queer kids and their families.

All Boys Aren't Blue was selected for the 2021 Rainbow Book List and earned a spot on its top ten picks for teen readers. It earned third place for the 2020 Goodreads Choice Awards Memoir & Autobiography category. Despite receiving mostly positive reviews from critics, All Boys Aren't Blue has been subjected to multiple attempts of censorship, becoming one of the top ten most banned and challenged books in the United States in the early 2020s.

== Content ==
The memoir takes the form of a collection of essays that describe Johnson's childhood until the age of 21. The narrative is sometimes linear and interspersed with letters to various family members. All Boys Aren't Blue begins with an introduction by Johnson, who explains that they are not just sharing their own childhood story, but "telling the story of millions of queer people who never got a chance to tell theirs."

Johnson describes the experience of growing up in a middle-class and close family, headed by their funny and loving grandmother Nanny, in the small town of Plainfield, New Jersey. As a child, they notice they are different from their relatives, but it takes time for them to realize why they feel that way. Stories also discuss their later experiences of attending a historically Black university in Virginia.

The book documents Johnson's close relationships with their brothers and family members alongside their journey of discovering their identity. It also discusses hard events from Johnson's youth and how they processed. Some concepts discussed in the book are consent, agency, and sexual abuse; toxic masculinity, gender identity, and structural marginalization; as well as family, brotherhood, and Black joy. The book also describes two sexual encounters and an experience of statutory rape. The memoir discusses healing, liberation, and finding freedom after challenging experiences.

=== Chapters ===
The first chapter discusses Johnson's elementary school experiences: after discovering double dutch, they loved playing with the group of girls who jump roped at recess every day. When one of Johnson's male friends warned them that other boys had started to gossip about them, the friend presented them with the option of playing football to save their reputation and friendship. Johnson decided to stop jump roping with their female friends and switch to football in order to stay friendly with the boys. This also helped improve Johnson's relationship with their father, who had criticized them for being too feminine but now bonded over their football skills.

Other stories describe their process of realizing the racism Black people have been subjected to the U.S., their commentary on the U.S. sex education system that they grew up with, their ideas and journey with gender and sexuality, and them processing the deaths of close family members. They illustrate their evolving understanding of gender by describing their childhood knowledge that they were meant to be a girl: they daydreamed about being Dominique, inspired by Dominique Dawes, and liked "girl things". However, they explained that they did not have the vocabulary to understand other possibilities for these experiences until they grew older. The book emphasizes that people should be themselves, and be able to define themselves outside of societal expectations.

Some chapters are written as letters to Johnson's relatives. One is to Johnson's grandmother, who they were very close to. She died as Johnson was writing the memoir, and they write about this as well. They write another letter to an older male cousin who abused them when they were 13. Johnson describes their confusion at the time, and the years of shame they felt afterward, having never spoken about the experience until writing about it. They write about their internal debate about including the story in a book aimed at young adults, and that they decided to keep it because this was an experience that happened to them as a young adult, and which happens to others. Another letter is written to a different cousin, Hope, a transgender woman. They discuss their experience of processing Hope's transition as a child, from being embarrassed to be seen with her, to learning from the example she set, and realizing they secretly wanted to be like Hope. They also describe the effect that seeing queer joy in Hope had on them, and how losing Hope affected them.

== Background ==
Johnson was motivated to write All Boys Aren't Blue by Toni Morrison's maxim "If there's a book you want to read, but it hasn't been written yet, then you must write it," which Johnson has tattooed on their right arm.

Johnson had recently written about violence against Black queer youth, and was especially affected by learning about Giovanni Melton, who was murdered by his father. The father reportedly said he would rather have a dead son than a gay son. Johnson ruminated on the differences between Melton's family and father and their own. Johnson's father was a police officer; he could have shared the mindset of Melton's father, but did not, and Johnson was not sure why. Johnson decided they wanted to share the story of their own childhood to help other Black queer kids and their families.

Initially Johnson planned the book as a resource guide, with each chapter's stories involving issues whose solutions could be listed at the end of the chapter. They pivoted from this design after deciding that many of the issues in their stories did not have solutions, and they did not want to misrepresent that experience. Instead, they focused on discussing their experiences of struggle as they grew up and learned about their intersectional Black and queer identity. They also wanted to describe how it can affect youth to grapple with questions of safety and identity without having the right resources. Johnson's primary audience was Black queer youth, but they thought non-Black queer youth could also relate to the story. They also thought the book could speak to the communities around queer youth, including parents, counselors, and teachers.

The "blue" in the title carries several meanings, being a color traditionally identified with masculinity and the color of police officers, who have disproportionately invoked violence against queer Black people. The color also references gender reveals, and Johnson's observation that as queer visibility has increased, straight communities have created more gender norms. The title also pays homage to the character Blue from Queen Sugar, as well as the appearance of Black skin in Moonlight and the play it is based upon, In Moonlight Black Boys Look Blue.

Johnson said they were very intentional with the book's cover design, trying to break past misconceptions people may have about the book by simply reading its title. They wanted the book to be clearly queer, and hoped that young readers could see themselves in the cover. They were also inspired to differentiate the book from three other Black queer memoirs that they admired: No Ashes in the Fire by Darnell Moore, I Can't Date Jesus by Michael Arceneaux, and How We Fight for Our Lives by Saeed Jones. The cover has a crown of flowers that are personal symbols: the middle flower refers to Johnson's grandmother, a focus of the book, and is a poinsettia. There is also a Bird of Paradise, Johnson's mother's favorite flower, and a yellow rose for Johnson's fraternity, Alpha Phi Alpha.

== Reception ==
=== Critical reception ===
All Boys Aren't Blue received a starred review from Kirkus, as well as positive reviews from School Library Journal, Booklist, and Publishers Weekly.

Kirkus called the book "[a] critical, captivating, merciful mirror for growing up Black and queer today."

Publishers Weekly noted, "Though at first glance the book lacks the synthesizing call to action that "manifesto" would imply, its "be yourself" message remains a radical stance for doubly marginalized individuals." They continued to say, “In a publishing landscape in need of queer black voices, readers who are sorting through similar concepts will be grateful to join him on the journey,” and called it "a balm and testimony to young readers as allies in the fight for equality."

The New York Times called it "[a]n exuberant, unapologetic memoir infused with a deep but clear-eyed love for its subjects."

HuffPost wrote that it was "an unflinching testimony that carves out space for Black queer kids to be seen."

Bitch magazine said that "All Boys Aren't Blue is a game changer."

Kirkus named All Boys Aren't Blue one of the best young adult biographies/memoirs of 2020. The New York Public Library and Chicago Public Library also included it in their list of the top ten books of 2020 for young adults.

=== Awards and honors ===
Year	Award	Result	Ref.
2021	ALA Rainbow Book List	Top 10	
2021	YALSA's Amazing Audiobooks for Young Adults	Selection	
2021	YALSA's Teens' Top 10	Selection	
2020	Goodreads Choice Award for Memoir & Autobiography	Nominee	
2019	Outstanding Books for the College Bound: Literature and Language Arts	Selection	

=== Censorship in the United States ===
All Boys Aren't Blue has frequently been censored because it includes LGBTQIA+ content and profanity, and was considered sexually explicit. In 2021, the American Library Association's Office of Intellectual Freedom named it the third most banned and challenged book in the United States of the year; it was the second most challenged book in 2022 and 2023. It was the most challenged book of 2024. School boards in at least ten states have removed the book from their libraries.

In 2021, Flagler County School Board member and retired teacher Jill Woolbright filed a criminal complaint against the superintendent for carrying the book, objecting to mentions of masturbation and oral sex. The Flagler County Sheriff's Office found that the content of the book was not a violation of law and did not warrant further investigation. However, the school board placed the book under review and four school libraries removed copies of the book, prompting student and parent protests.

In 2021, the Wentzville School Board in Missouri banned All Boys Aren't Blue, alongside three other books, from the district's high school libraries. Other books included in the ban were Toni Morrison’s The Bluest Eye, Kiese Laymon’s Heavy: An American Memoir, and Alison Bechdel’s Fun Home.

In 2022, All Boys Aren't Blue was listed among 52 books banned by the Alpine School District following the implementation of Utah law H.B. 374, “Sensitive Materials In Schools," 42% of which “feature LGBTQ+ characters and or themes.” Many of the books were removed because they were considered to contain pornographic material according to the new law, which defines pornography using the following criteria:

- "The average person" would find that the material, on the whole, "appeals to prurient interest in sex"
- The material "is patently offensive in the description or depiction of nudity, sexual conduct, sexual excitement, sadomasochistic abuse, or excretion"
- The material, on the whole, "does not have serious literary, artistic, political or scientific value."

== Adaptation ==
All Boys Aren't Blue was adapted into a short film in 2021. The film was directed by Nathan Hale Williams and stars Dyllón Burnside.

All Boys Aren't Blue was optioned to be developed as a TV series by actress Gabrielle Union.
