= Frances Conroy filmography =

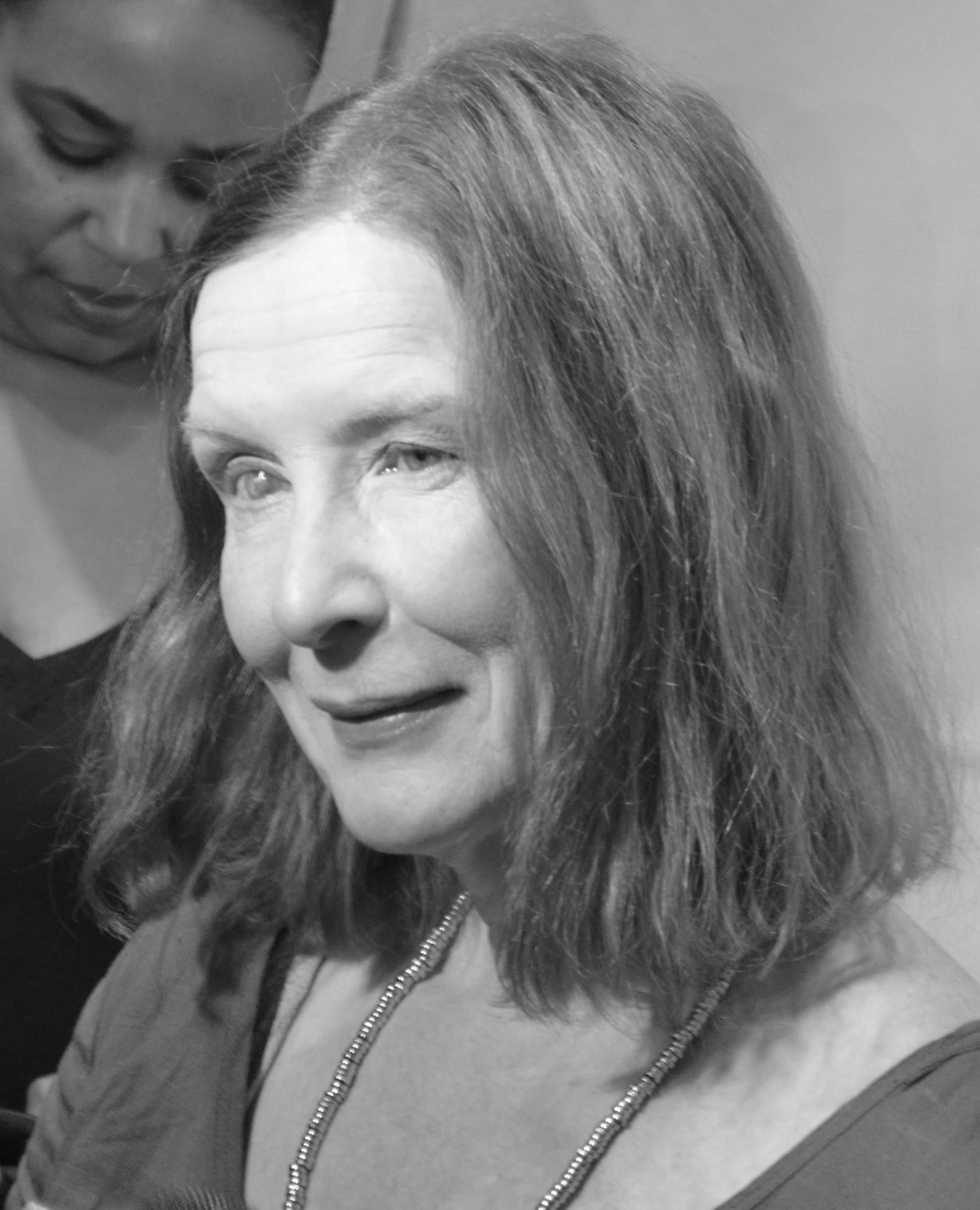

The following is a list of actress Frances Conroy's acting credits, including her appearances in film, television, and the theatre.

With over 100 acting credits to her name, Conroy is known for her starring role as Ruth Fisher on the HBO series Six Feet Under. The role won her a Golden Globe Award and three Screen Actors Guild Awards.

Since Six Feet Under's ending, she guest starred in numerous television programs and had supporting roles in major motion pictures. She returned to television prominence in 2011, when she was cast in a recurring role on the FX anthology-horror series American Horror Story. Conroy's role garnered acclaim once again, being nominated for a Primetime Emmy Award as well as a Saturn Award. She then proceeded to appear in the next three seasons of the show, getting nominated for a second Primetime Emmy Award for her appearance in the third season. She also returned to American Horror Story as a guest in for its sixth and seventh seasons, entitled Roanoke and Cult before recurring in Apocalypse, the show's eighth season. In 2021, Conroy returned to the main cast for the show's tenth season, entitled Double Feature.

In 2015, she starred in the Hulu original series Casual, which was nominated for a Golden Globe Award for Best Television Series – Musical or Comedy for its first season and starred in The Mist in 2017. From 2020–2022, Conroy had also portrayed Eileen Wood on Netflix's Dead To Me.

== Film ==
=== Feature films ===
Year	Title	Role	Notes
1979	Manhattan	Shakespearean actress	
1984	Falling in Love	Waitress	
1987	Amazing Grace and Chuck	Pamela	
1988	Rocket Gibraltar	Ruby Hanson	
1988	Another Woman	Lynn	
1988	Dirty Rotten Scoundrels	Diana	
1989	Crimes and Misdemeanors	House Owner	
1991	Billy Bathgate	Mary Behan	
1992	Scent of a Woman	Christine Downes	
1993	Sleepless in Seattle	Irene Reed	
1993	The Adventures of Huck Finn	Scrawny Shanty Lady	
1994	Developing	Clare	Short film
1995	The Neon Bible	Miss Scover	
1995	Angela	Anne's mother	Credited as Francis Conroy
1996	The Crucible	Ann Putnam	
2002	Maid in Manhattan	Paula Burns	
2003	Die, Mommie, Die!	Bootsie Carp	
2004	Catwoman	Ophelia Powers	
2004	The Aviator	Katharine Martha Houghton Hepburn	
2005	Shopgirl	Catherine Buttersfield	
2005	Broken Flowers	Dora Anderson	
2006	Ira and Abby	Lynn Willoughby	
2006	The Wicker Man	Dr. T.H. Moss	
2007	The Seeker: The Dark is Rising	Miss Greythorne	
2008	Humboldt County	Rosie	
2008	The Tale of Despereaux	Antoinette	Voice
2009	Love Happens	Eloise's mom	
2009	Waking Madison	Dolly Walker	
2009	New in Town	Trudy Van Uuden	
2009	Stay Cool	Mrs. Leuchtenberger	
2009	Shelter	Mrs. Bernberg	
2010	Bloodworth	Julia Bloodworth	
2010	Stone	Madylyn Mabry	
2011	Tom and Jerry and the Wizard of Oz	Aunt Em/Glinda	Voice
2011	All-Star Superman	Martha Kent	Voice
2013	Superman: Unbound	Martha Kent	Voice
2014	Making the Rules	Mother	
2014	Chasing Ghosts	Dara	
2015	Welcome to Happiness	Claiborne	
2016	No Pay, Nudity	Andrea	
2016	Tom and Jerry: Back to Oz	Aunt Em/Glinda	Voice
2018	The Tale	Jane Graham	
2018	Mountain Rest	Ethel	
2019	Joker	Penny Fleck	
2019	James vs. His Future Self	Dr. Rowley	
2021	The Power of the Dog	Old Lady	
2023	Nimona	The Director	Voice

=== Television films ===
Year	Title	Role
1978	All's Well That Ends Well	Diana
1982	The Royal Romance of Charles and Diana	Mrs. Watson
1988	Terrorist on Trial: The United States vs. Salim Ajami	Lyn Kessler
1994	One More Mountain	Peggy Breen
1995	Journey	Fiona
1998	Thicker Than Blood	Mrs. Byrne
1999	Murder in a Small Town	Martha Lassiter
2006	A Perfect Day	Camille Bailey
2008	Mike Birbiglia's Secret Public Journal	Kathy
2012	Beautiful People	Lydia
2013	Ring of Fire	Maybelle Carter

== Television ==
Year	Title	Role	Notes
1982	American Playhouse	Mother	Episode: "Carl Sandburg: Echoes and Silences"
1983	Kennedy	Jean Kennedy Smith	Unknown episodes
1984	American Playhouse	Louise Mallard	Episode: "The Joy That Kills"
1984	3-2-1 Contact	Kateh	Episode: "Earth: Building Models"
1986	The Twilight Zone	Ellen Pendleton	Episode: "The Library"
1986	Newhart	Liz Sable	Episode: "Co-Hostess Twinkie"
1986	Hill Street Blues	Porsche lady	Episode: "Falling from Grace"
1987	Remington Steele	Gladys Lynch	Episode: "Steele Hanging in There: Part 1"
1987	Crime Story	Mrs. Jankowski	Episode: "The Battle of Las Vegas"
1989	Great Performances	Mrs. Gibbs	Episode: "Our Town"
1990	Law & Order	Elizabeth Hendrick	Episode: "Prisoner of Love"
1993	Alex Haley's Queen	Mrs. Benson	2 episodes
1997	Crisis Center	Marilyn	Episode: "The Center"
1998	Cosby	Elizabeth	Episode: "Judgement Day"
1999	Law & Order	Rosa Halasy	Episode: "Disciple"
1999	Stark Raving Mad	Beverly Rose	Episode: "The Pigeon"
2001–05	Six Feet Under	Ruth Fisher	63 episodes
2002	Lloyd in Space	Mrs. Throbbing Energy Source (voice)	Episode: "The Thrilla at Intrepidvilla"
2004	Higglytown Heroes	Veterinarian Hero (voice)	Episode: "Flappy's Not Happy"
2007–08	ER	Becky Riley	2 episodes
2008	Desperate Housewives	Virginia Hildebrand	3 episodes
2009–14	How I Met Your Mother	Loretta Stinson	9 episodes
2010	Nip/Tuck	Jane Fields	Episode: "Sheila Carlton"
2010	Happy Town	Peggy Haplin	7 episodes
2010	Grey's Anatomy	Eleanor	Episode: "Can't Fight Biology"
2010–13	Scooby-Doo! Mystery Incorporated	Angie Dinkley (voice)	15 episodes
2011	United States of Tara	Sandy Gregson	2 episodes
2011	Love Bites	Faye Strathmore	Episode: "How To..."
2011	The Mentalist	Elspeth	Episode: "The Red Mile"
2011	American Horror Story: Murder House	Moira O'Hara	11 episodes
2012–13	American Horror Story: Asylum	Shachath	5 episodes
2013	Royal Pains	Blythe Ballard	6 episodes
2013–14	American Horror Story: Coven	Myrtle Snow	10 episodes
2014	American Horror Story: Freak Show	Gloria Mott	8 episodes
2015	Married	Janice	Episode: "Thanksgiving"
2015–18	Casual	Dawn	11 episodes
2015	Getting On	Dr. Alice Marvel	Episode: "No, I Don't Want a Fucking Smiley Face"
2016	The Real O'Neals	Grandma Agnes	Episode: "The Real Grandma"
2016	American Horror Story: Roanoke	Denise Monroe (portraying Mama Polk)	Episode: "Chapter 5"
2017	We Bare Bears	Faye (voice)	Episode: "Neighbors"
2017	The Mist	Nathalie Raven	10 episodes
2017	American Horror Story: Cult	Bebe Babbitt	2 episodes
2018	Young Sheldon	Dr. Flora Douglas	Episode: "An Eagle Feather, a String Bean, and an Eskimo"
2018–19	Arrested Development	Lottie Dottie	5 episodes
2018–19	Castle Rock	Martha Lacy	3 episodes
2018	American Horror Story: Apocalypse	Myrtle Snow	6 episodes
2018	American Horror Story: Apocalypse	Moira O'Hara	Episode: "Return to Murder House"
2020–22	Dead to Me	Eileen Wood	5 episodes
2020	Summer Camp Island	Mrs. Clarinet / Lead Elf of Ski Patrol (voice)	3 episodes
2021	American Horror Story: Double Feature	Sarah Cunningham / Belle Noir	6 episodes
2022	The Boys Presents: Diabolical	Barb (voice)	Episode: "An Animated Short Where Pissed-Off Supes Kill Their Parents"
2026	Haunted Hotel	Catherine Witherkay (voice)	Episode: "Ooze"
2026	American Horror Story: 13	Myrtle Snow	3 episodes

== Theater ==
Year	Title	Role(s)	Notes
1976	Measure for Measure	Lord/Officer/Citizen/Nun/Monk/Attendant	Delacorte Theater
1978	Mother Courage and Her Children	Kattrin	The Acting Company
1978	King Lear	Cordelia	The Acting Company
1978	All's Well That Ends Well	Isabel/Diana	Delacorte Theater
1979	Sorrows of Stephen	Christine (replacement)	Joseph Papp Public Theater
1980	Othello	Desdemona	Delacorte Theater
1980	The Lady from Dubuque	Jo	Morosco Theatre
1982	Zastrozzi	Julia	Joseph Papp Public Theater
1983	Painting Churches	Margaret Church	Second Stage Theatre
1984	To Gillian on Her 37th Birthday	Kevin	Ensemble Studio Theatre
1984	Romance Language	Louisa May Alcott	Playwrights Horizons
1987	Man and Superman	Ann Whitefield	Roundabout Theatre Company
1988	Zero Positive	Samantha	Joseph Papp Public Theater
1988–89	Our Town	Mrs. Gibbs	Lyceum Theatre
1989	The Secret Rapture	Marion French	Ethel Barrymore Theatre
1990	Some Americans Abroad	Frankie Lewis	Vivian Beaumont Theater
1990	Ivanov	Anna Petrovna	Yale Repertory Theatre
1991	A Bright Room Called Day	Agnes Eggling	Joseph Papp Public Theater
1991	Heartbreak House	Mrs. Hesione Hushabye	South Coast Repertory
1991–92	Two Shakespearean Actors	Catherine Forrest	Cort Theatre
1992	Lips Together, Teeth Apart	Sally Truman (replacement)	Music Box Theatre
1993	The Last Yankee	Patricia Hamilton (replacement)	Manhattan Theatre Club
1993	In the Summer House	Mrs. Constable	Vivian Beaumont Theater
1994	Booth	Mary Ann	York Theatre
1994	Broken Glass	Margaret Hyman	Long Wharf Theatre, Booth Theatre
1994–95	Three Tall Women	"B" (replacement)	Promenade Theatre
1996	Arts and Leisure	Lenore	Playwrights Horizons
1996–97	The Rehearsal	The Countess	Criterion Center Stage Right
1997	The Little Foxes	Birdie Hubbard	Vivian Beaumont Theater
1998	The Skin of Our Teeth	Mrs. Antrobus	Delacorte Theatre
1998	The Ride Down Mt. Morgan	Theo	The Public Theater
1999	Ring Round the Moon	Capulat	Belasco Theatre
1999–2000	The Dinner Party	Gabrielle Buonocelli	Mark Taper Forum
2000	The Ride Down Mt. Morgan	Theo	Ambassador Theatre
2006	Pyrenees	Vivienne	Kirk Douglas Theater
2010	The Subject Was Roses	Nettie Cleary	Mark Taper Forum

== See also ==
- List of awards and nominations received by Frances Conroy
