= Leonard S. Marcus =

Author and children's literature expert

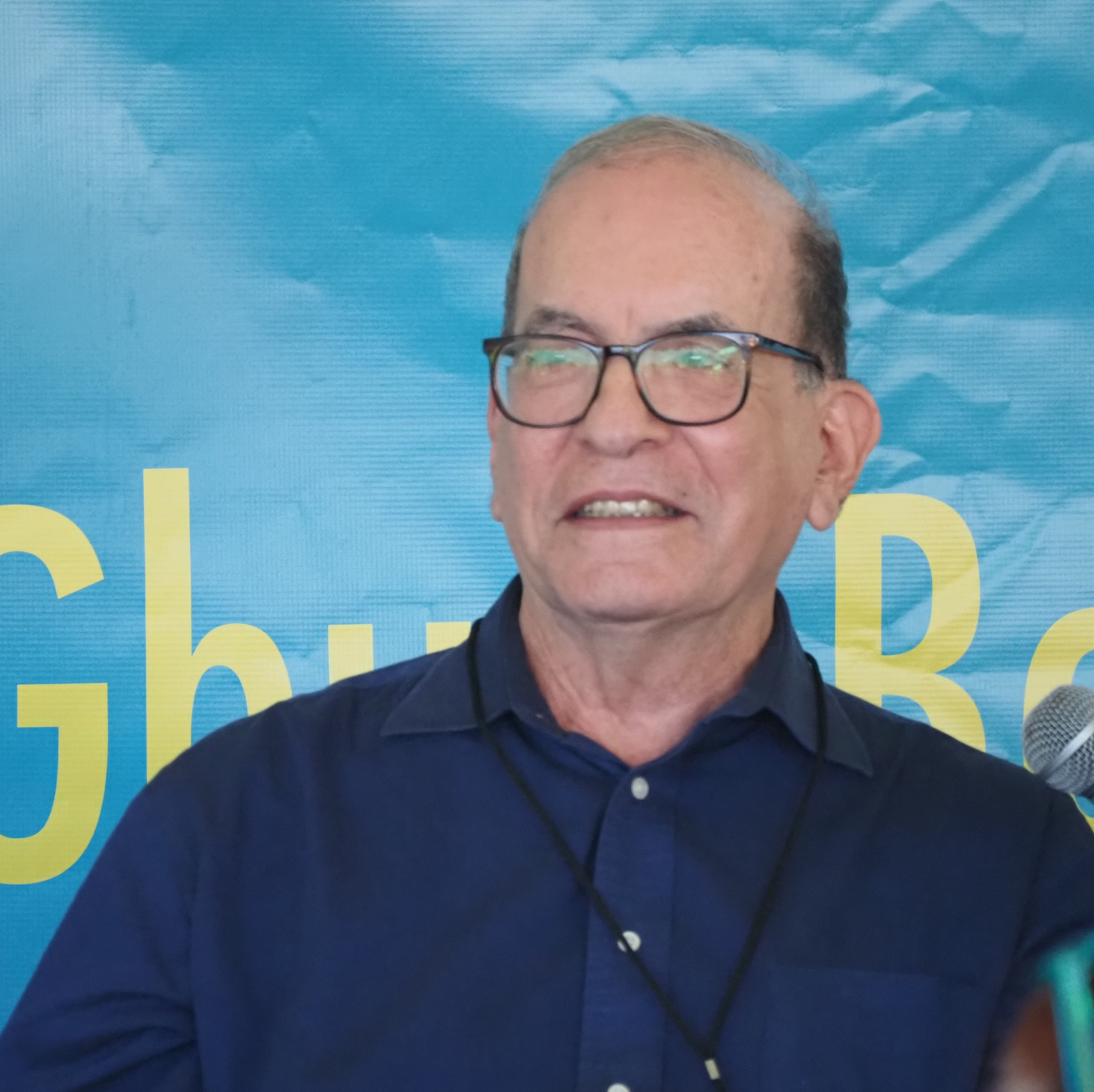
- at the 2026 Gaithersburg Book Festival
- Website: http://www.leonardmarcus.com/

Leonard S. Marcus (born December 11, 1950) is an American author and expert on English-language children's literature. Marcus has been a critic for several publications including Horn Book and the New York Times Book review. Born and raised in Mount Vernon, New York, he attended Yale University (Class of 1972) and was the editor of the Yale Literary Magazine.

Marcus was married to children's book author and illustrator Amy Schwartz from 1990 until her death in 2023. The couple had one son.

== Works ==
- Mr. Lincoln Sits for His Portrait: The Story of a Photograph That Became an American Icon (Farrar, Straus and Giroux, 2023)
- You Can't Say That!: Writers for Young People Talk About Censorship, Free Expression, and the Stories They Have to Tell (September 16, 2021)
- Helen Oxenbury: A Life in Illustration (Walker UK/Candlewick USA, fall 2017)
- The Runaway Bunny 75th Anniversary Book (HarperCollins, spring 2017)
- Comics Confidential: Thirteen Graphic Novelists Talk Story, Craft, and Life Outside the Box (Candlewick, fall 2016)
- Randolph Caldecott: The Man Who Could Not Stop Drawing (Frances Foster/Farrar, Straus and Giroux, 2013)
- Maurice Sendak: A Celebration of the Artist and His Work (Abrams, 2013)
- Listening for Madeleine: A Portrait of Madeleine L’Engle in Many Voices (Farrar, Straus and Giroux, 2012)
- Show Me A Story! Why Picture Books Matter (Candlewick, 2012)
- The Annotated Phantom Tollbooth (Knopf, 2011)
- Funny Business: Conversations with Writers of Comedy (Candlewick, 2009)
- Minders of MakeBelieve: Idealists, Entrepreneurs, and the Shaping of American Children’s Literature (Houghton Mifflin, 2008)
- A Caldecott Celebration: Seven Artists and Their Paths to the Caldecott Medal (expanded, tenthanniversary edition) (Walker, 2008)
- Golden Legacy: How Golden Books Won Children’s Hearts, Changed Publishing Forever, and Became an American Icon Along the Way (Random House, 2007)
- Pass It Down: Five PictureBook Families Make Their Mark (Walker, 2007)
- Oscar: The Big Adventure of a Little Sock Monkey, coauthored with Amy Schwartz; illustrated by Amy Schwartz, (Harper/Tegen, 2006)
- The Wand In The Word: Conversations With Writers of Fantasy (Candlewick Press, 2006)
- Storied City: A Children's BookWalking Tour Guide to New York City (Dutton, 2003)
- Ways of Telling: Conversations on the Art of the Picture Book (Dutton, 2002)
- Side by Side: Five Favorite Picture Book Teams Go To Work (Walker, 2001)
- Author Talk (Simon & Schuster, 2000)
- Dear Genius: The Letters of Ursula Nordstrom (ed) (HarperCollins, 1998; 2000)
- Margaret Wise Brown: Awakened by the Moon (Beacon, 1992; Harper Perennial, 1999)
- A Caldecott Celebration: Six Artists and Their Paths to the Caldecott Medal (Walker, 1998)
- The Making of Goodnight Moon: A Fiftieth Anniversary Retrospective (HarperCollins, 1997)
- Morrow Junior Books: The First Fifty Years (Morrow, 1996)
- 75 Years of Children’s Book Week Posters (Knopf, 1994)
- Lifelines: A Poetry Anthology (Dutton, 1994)
- Mother Goose's Little Misfortunes (Bradbury, 1990)
- Humor and Play in Children's Literature (Johns Hopkins UP, 1989)
- An Epinal Album: Popular Prints from Nineteenth Century France (Godine, 1984)
- Picture Books (Johns Hopkins UP, 1984)
- Petrouchka (Godine, 1983)
