= The Sissy Duckling =

2002 picture book by Harvey Fierstein

- The Sissy Duckling, book cover
- Author: Harvey Fierstein
- Illustrator: Henry Cole
- Language: English
- Genre: Picture book
- Publisher: Simon & Schuster
- Publication date: 2002
- Publication place: United States
- Media type: Print
- Pages: 40 pp
- ISBN: 0-689-83566-3

The Sissy Duckling is a children's picture book written by playwright, actor, and gay-rights activist Harvey Fierstein and illustrated by Henry Cole. It is 40 pages long and intended for children ages 5–8.

It follows the story of Elmer, a duckling who is mocked for being a sissy but who ultimately proves his bravery. It is based on an HBO children's special aired three years before the book was released, written by and starring Fierstein as the voice of Elmer the Duckling. The special was nominated for the GLAAD Media Award for Outstanding Individual Episode.

== Background ==
Written by celebrated playwright and gay-rights activist Harvey Fierstein, The Sissy Duckling draws from his own childhood experiences. In a 2002 Publishers Weekly interview, Fierstein explains that, as a young child with gender non-conforming habits, he would have valued a book like The Sissy Duckling that highlights the creativity and heroism of an unconventional character. Fierstein was inspired to write the story of The Sissy Duckling after being asked to write an episode for the HBO series Happily Ever After: Fairy Tales for Every Child. They asked him to make a Jewish version of a classic Western fairy-tale, but Fierstein thought that a fairy-tale modified to center a gay character was more needed at the time, choosing Hans Christian Andersen’s The Ugly Duckling to modify and recreate. While creating the character, Elmer, Fierstein wanted to write about a kid who is happy and does what he wants. He wanted to show that kids like Elmer, the ones that are different from the other kids, are the ones that change the world. The Sissy Duckling, however, was not made into an episode of Happily Ever After, but rather an entirely separate TV special aired on HBO in 1999. Fierstein was then contacted by Simon & Schuster to turn his original script into a children’s picture book.

== Publication ==
The Sissy Duckling was published in 2002 by Simon & Schuster Books for Young Readers, and illustrated by Henry Cole.

== Summary ==
In the book, our main character Elmer was different than the other ducks. Unlike the other ducks, Elmer likes to build things, paint pictures, and play make-believe. Because of this Elmer is made fun of by the other ducks and is called a sissy. After hearing his father call him names, Elmer sets off on his own to make a home. When his flock flies south for the winter, Elmer stays back as the flock leaves. While watching his flock fly away, Elmer sees his father shot by hunters. Elmer then risks his own life to rescue his dad and take him to safety. Throughout the winter Elmer is able to nurse his father back to health and rekindle their relationship together. When the flock returns to their home after winter, the mother duck stops to pay remembrance to those who didn't make it through the winter. When she mentions Elmer, the sissy duck, there are giggles and snickers from the other ducks as they comment about the sissy duck. As this happens, the father duck steps up to defend Elmer. All of the ducks were surprised by Elmer's courage to help his father and survive the winter. Elmer reminds all of the ducks that he is the same duck he has always been, and that he hasn't changed-they have.

== Analysis ==
Reviewers suggest that the book will help readers gain confidence in who they are. For example, Michael Ross believes, "Any adult reader who has a child, experienced being chosen last for a team sport at a school, or ostracized because of being 'different,' will be cheering the main character.” Furthermore, research has shown that the book is beneficial. In a case study about the effects of implementing LGBTQIA+ related books into the classroom, a teacher had her students write letters to the sissy duckling. Many of the students expressed “how they had been treated unfairly because of things out of their control, much like the sissy duckling,” which allowed them to connect to the duckling and feel comfort.

== Reception ==
The Kirkus Reviews magazine positively reviewed the book as “heartwarming”, while Publishers Weekly praised Fierstein for handling "serious and silly moments with aplomb".

Despite its overall positive public reception, The Sissy Duckling has garnered negative reception due to its LGBTQ+ themes. Specifically, it was challenged by the Montgomery County, Texas Memorial Library System in 2004, along with 15 other children’s books said to have contained “gay-positive” themes. Objections to the book were posted on the Library Patrons of Texas website. The posts referenced and linked other, similar objections posted on the website of the Fairfax County, Virginia-based organization Parents Against Bad Books in Schools.
