= Marsha Wilson Chall =

American educator and author (1953–2026)

Marsha Wilson Chall (November 7, 1953 – March 29, 2026) was an American educator and author of children's picture books. Several of her books were inspired by her home state of Minnesota.

== Life and career ==
=== Early life and education ===
Chall was born in Minneapolis, Minnesota on November 7, 1953. She was an only child. She earned a Bachelor of Science from Drake University in 1975 and a Master of Arts from the University of Minnesota in 1984.

=== Career ===
Chall published her first book, Mattie, in 1992. She received a Smithsonian Notable Children's Book citation in 2000 for Bonaparte. Bonaparte received a starred review from Publishers Weekly, which said the book was "fresh as a newly baked croissant" and "Chall's narrative strikes just the right balance between humor and feelings of loss in this captivating dog-loses-boy, dog-gets-boy tale".

She worked at Metropolitan State University as an adult literacy instructor.

=== Personal life and death ===
Chall was married and had two children. She lived on a farm near Minneapolis. She died on March 29, 2026, at the age of 72.

== Selected works ==
- Mattie. Illustrated by Barbara Lehman. 1992.
- Up North at the Cabin. Illustrated by Steve Johnson. 1992.
- Rupa Raises the Sun. Illustrated by Rosanne Litzinger. 1998.
- Sugarbush Spring. Illustrated by Jim Daly. 2000.
- Bonaparte. Illustrated by Wendy Anderson Halperin. 2000.
- Prairie Train. Illustrated by John Thompson. 2000.
- Happy Birthday, America. Illustrated by Guy Porfirio. 2000.
- One Pup's Up. Illustrated by Henry Cole. 2010.
- Pick a Pup. Illustrated by Jed Henry. 2011.
- A Secret Keeps. Illustrated by Heather M. Solomon. 2012.
- The Secret Life of Figgy Mustardo. Illustrated by Alison Friend. 2016.
