= How to Slowly Kill Yourself and Others in America =

Kiese Laymon essay collection

- Cover image
- Author: Kiese Laymon
- Language: English
- Publisher: Simon & Schuster
- Publication date: 2020
- Publication place: United States
- Pages: 176
- ISBN: 9781982170820

How to Slowly Kill Yourself and Others in America is a collection of essays by author and essayist Kiese Laymon. The collection touches on subjects ranging from family, race, violence, and celebrity to music, writing, and coming of age in Mississippi. How to Slowly Kill Yourself and Others in America was named a notable book of 2021 by The New York Times critics.

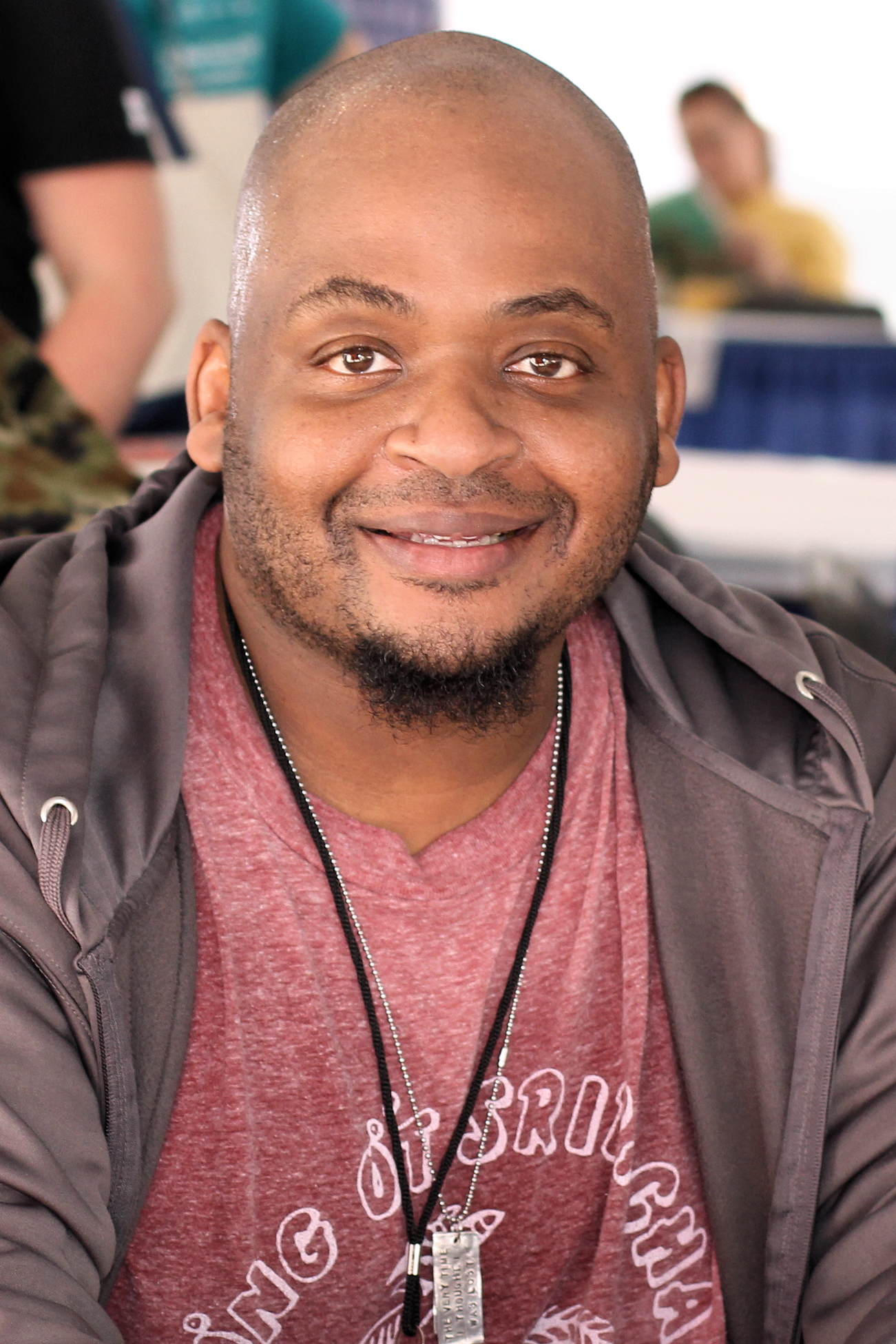
The author of How to Slowly Kill Yourself and Others in America, Kiese Laymon

== Background ==
Kiese Laymon was offered his first publishing deal at age 28. He started How to Slowly Kill Yourself and Others in America in July 2007 after his uncle had died. While it was originally called On Parole, Laymon said that "while my relationship with paragraphs, chapters, and dead authors was getting more intimate, I was getting worse at being human...later that night, I could not sleep, and for the first time in my life, I wrote the sentence, 'I’ve been slowly killing myself and others close to me.'" He published the first edition of the collection in 2013.

At age 47, Laymon approached the initial publisher of the collection to buy the rights to his book back. "I paid ten times what the publisher initially paid for the books. I'm thinking a lot about debt, reparation, vengeance, residue, and the tendrils of humiliation caused and withstood...revision did that." As he began to revise the piece, he said "I hope that the reader works their way back to the beginning which, for me, is always the end. The middle though—all those middles of all those essays and all those real and imagined friendships—is where we find the guts." When speaking on his revision, he said "I am proud of myself for not giving up, for accepting help, for not drowning in humiliations of yesterday and the inevitable terror of tomorrow. That is the hardest sentence I’ve ever written." The second revised edition of the collection was successfully published in 2020.

== Notable essay ==
In his chapter, "Hip Hop Stole My Southern Black Boy", Laymon talks about how the dominance of New York and California hip hop initially overshadowed and erased whatever regional pride and stories he wanted to tell. Leslie K. Dunlap closes with, "With its Mississippi setting and sensibility, American Studies scholars will likely soon cite it, particularly the essay "Hip-Hop Stole My Southern Black Boy", as an example of the "New Southern Studies", which places the Black South and regional identity at the center of an analysis of national economic, political, creative, and intellectual narratives".

== Reception ==
How to Slowly Kill Yourself and Others in America received rave reviews from following its publishing in 2013 from various literary reviews. The book was called "brilliant", "unapologetic", "reimaginative", "graceful", "poignant, moving, and meditating."

In her review for Booklist, Annie Bostram said that the book was, "Gracefully encompassing pain and power and so much in between, Laymon's artfully piercing essays share truth without limit, and could not feel more timely."

Christopher Romaguera highlights in his review for Emerson College's Ploughshares blog that Kiese Laymon's second release of How to Slowly Kill Yourself and Others in America revisits his essays and invites the reader to reimagine them, offering a more experienced point of view from his home state. "Writing from a place he has more experiences in—his home state of Mississippi." Romaguera tells his audience about how Laymon moved to back Mississippi and then released the second edition of his collection.

Leslie K. Dunlap asserts in her ethnic studies review for Virginia Commonwealth University that Kiese Laymon's essay collection serves as "a literary intervention into masculinity studies in our current era." Dunlap mentions how Laymon procured change "by allowing himself the opportunity to be healed through intimate relationships and conversations".

Jerald Walker stated in his review for The New York Times Book Review that the novel is a "blues ethos of stating and confronting the brutal facts of life and of placing a high premium on style... brilliant."

Rosalind Bentley on behalf of The Atlanta Journal-Constitution wrote on the collection that, "Laymon writes that it took courage for him to face himself, the truth of who he is, who he was. Necessary steps to get to the man he wants to be. The same can be said of the nation, he writes. It takes courage to face things down, call them out and then to act on them. It takes fearless revision.
