= Sphen and Magic =

Homosexual penguin couple

- Species: Gentoo penguin
- Sex: Males
- Hatched: Sphen; August 19, 2013; Magic; August 19, 2016 (age 10)
- Died: Sphen; August 22, 2024 (aged 11); Sea Life Sydney Aquarium
- Nationality: Australia
- Known for: Same-sex animal couple
- Offspring: Lara, Clancy (both adopted)

Sphen and Magic were two male gentoo penguins at the Sea Life Sydney Aquarium. After meeting in 2018, they adopted and raised two chicks together, becoming internationally famous and symbolic for the Australian gay rights movement. Sphen died in August 2024 at the age of 11.

== History ==
Sphen was born at SeaWorld, whereas Magic was born at the Sea Life Melbourne Aquarium three years later. Magic and Sphen first met in the summer of 2018 at the Sea Life Sydney Aquarium, where they were part of a colony of 33 penguins. They courted by bowing, bringing each other pebbles, and accepting each other's pebbles, and then by singing to each other. During mating season, aquarium managers noted that the couple had made the biggest nest and had sat on it constantly, taking turns to do so for 28 days, a significantly better result than the other penguins.

The aquarium's penguin keepers made the decision that the pair should be allowed to raise a chick, and alerted leadership that this would be the case, which executives embraced. Managers gave them a dummy egg, which they successfully nursed. As a result, when a heterosexual penguin couple left an egg unattended, the workers gave the egg to Sphen and Magic. Being younger, Magic initially spent less time caring for the egg, though later learned to do so more frequently. The egg hatched on a Friday in October that year, weighing 91 grams (3.2 oz) and being the only egg to have hatched in the entire colony. The chick was named Baby Sphengic, and in January 2019, the chick was revealed to be a female and renamed Lara.

In November 2019 it was revealed that the couple were fostering a second chick after zoo staff saw another couple struggling to incubate two eggs simultaneously. This second chick was named Clancy.

In 2024, following a deterioration in Sphen's health, the aquarium's veterinary team euthanised him to end his discomfort and pain. Zoo staff brought Magic to his side to mourn; he sang, which was echoed by the other 45 penguins in the colony. Sphen's death, at the age of 11, was announced on 22 August 2024; the cause of his deterioration will be investigated.

== Impact ==
The year prior to the pair meeting, in 2017, same-sex marriage in Australia was legalized; the penguins became a larger symbol of this. The aquarium initially published videos about the penguins, including their singing and making of a pebble nest. Responses to this varied, with some homophobic commenters arguing that the word "gay" should not be used for the penguins, that they were "just friends" and that their relationship was "unnatural". Some conservatives argued that the penguins were being used to promote a political agenda.

The penguins inspired a float for the Sydney Gay and Lesbian Mardi Gras parade, featured in the Netflix comedy-drama series Atypical, and were referenced in Australia's education syllabus. Richard Dilly, the aquarium manager, noted that through the fame of the penguins the aquarium had been able to share messages concerning conservation, plastic pollution, global warming and the protection of wild penguins through fundraising initiatives.

== See also ==
- List of individual birds
- Homosexual behavior in penguins
- List of animals displaying homosexual behavior
- Roy and Silo
