= Beyond Magenta =

2014 book by Susan Kuklin

- Author: Susan Kuklin
- Language: English
- Genre: Young adult non-fiction
- Publisher: Candlewick Press
- Publication date: February 11, 2014
- Publication place: United States
- Pages: 192
- ISBN: 978-0-7636-5611-9

Beyond Magenta: Transgender Teens Speak Out is a 2014 book written by American author Susan Kuklin. For the book, Kuklin met and interviewed six transgender or gender-neutral young adults, describing their sense of identity before, during, and after transitioning.

Beyond Magenta has received many awards. Despite its reception, the book was on the Top 10 Most Challenged Books lists for 2015 and 2019.

== Background ==
After writing No Choirboy, a book about incarcerated teens, Kuklin wondered what it might feel like to be imprisoned inside your own body, which led her to thinking about transgender individuals. From here, Kuklin reached out to the Callen-Lorde Community Health Center in Manhattan, "which primarily serves New York's LGBT community and has a teen health outreach program." There, Kuklin connected with five transgender youth who became the center of Beyond Magenta. The sixth teenager represented in the book was contacted through "Proud Theater, a nonprofit, all-volunteer theater group for gay and lesbian youth in Madison, Wis[consin]."

After connecting with the teens, Kuklin interviewed each of them, then pieced the stories together to create a cohesive narrative.

== Reception ==
=== Reviews ===
Beyond Magenta was well received by critics, including starred reviews from Publishers Weekly, Booklist, and Kirkus Reviews.

Publishers Weekly noted that the book's "chief value isn't just in the stories it reveals but in the way Kuklin captures these teenagers not as idealized exemplars of what it 'means' to be transgender but as full, complex, and imperfect human beings."

Kirkus called the book "[i]nformative, revealing, powerful and necessary," and Booklist's Michael Cart "highly recommended" it.

School Library Journal called Beyond Magenta a "powerful and important reading ... that every teen should read," saying, "What makes this book outstanding is the way that Kuklin allows the teen voice to shine, with very little authorial interruption." However, they noted that it didn't have "the literary chops" of other books.

The audiobook, narrated by Tanya Eby, received a positive review from Booklist, who noted that "A cast of talented narrators comes together for this honest and heartfelt recording."

=== Awards and honors ===
Beyond Magenta was named one of the best nonfiction books of 2014 by Advocate, Booklist, The Bulletin of the Center for Children's Books, Kirkus Reviews, Redbery Books, and Shelf Awareness. It was also named CCBC Choice book for Understanding Oneself and Others. The following year, the American Library Association included Beyond Magenta on their annual Rainbow List, and it was named a notable book by the International Reading Association and the National Council on Social Studies. The National Multiple Sclerosis Society also included it on their list of Books for a Better Life Award for Childcare/Parenting.

Awards for Beyond Magenta
| Year | Award/Honor | Result | Ref. |
|---|---|---|---|
| 2015 | Bank Street College of Education's Flora Stieglitz Straus Award | Winner | |
| 2015 | Lambda Literary Award for LGBT Children's/Young Adult Literature | Winner | |
| 2015 | Stonewall Book Award for Children's and Young Adult Literature | Honor | |
| 2014 | Foreword INDIE for Young Adult Nonfiction | Winner | |
| 2014 | Cybils Award: Nonfiction for Young Adults | Finalist | |

=== Bans ===
Beyond Magenta landed the 27th spot on the American Library Association's list of the most banned and challenged books in the United States between 2010 and 2019.

In 2015, Beyond Magenta was listed as the fourth-most banned book in the United States because of its inclusion of offensive language, homosexuality, and sex education. Challengers deemed the book anti-family and inappropriate for the age group, also stating that it had conflicts with political and religious viewpoints.

In 2019, Beyond Magenta became the second-most banned book because of its LGBTQIA+ content, "its effect on any young people who would read it," and concerns that it was sexually explicit and biased. As of 2022, eleven U.S. school districts have banned the book.
