= I Am Jazz (book) =

2014 picture book by Jazz Jennings and Jessica Herthel

- Author: Jessica Hershel, Jazz Jennings
- Illustrator: Shelagh McNicholas
- Language: English
- Genre: Children's book, LGBT books for kids
- Publisher: Dial Books
- Publication date: September 4, 2014
- Publication place: United States
- ISBN: 9780803741072

I Am Jazz, published in 2014, was co-written by Jessica Herthel and Jazz Jennings and illustrated by Shelagh McNicholas. It is based on the real-life experiences of Jazz Jennings, a transgender YouTube personality, Human Rights Campaign Youth Ambassador, and the main star of the TLC series I Am Jazz. Jazz was assigned male at birth, but from age two, she struggled with having “a girl brain but a boy body.”

== Reception ==
I am Jazz has received multiple awards, including the American Library Association's Rainbow Project Book List Award (2015).

I am Jazz has landed on the American Library Association's list of Top 10 Challenged Books of 2015, 2016, 2017, and 2019. The book has been challenged and relocated for LGBTQIA+ content, for having a transgender character, for confronting a topic that is “sensitive, controversial, and politically charged.”

=== Challenge at Mount Horeb Area School District ===
On November 23, 2015, a reading of I Am Jazz was scheduled at the Mount Horeb Primary Center, a public elementary school where a student had recently transitioned from boy to girl like the main character in I Am Jazz. School staff had scheduled the reading to "support gender-variant students and their families."

After learning about the event, the Liberty Counsel, a conservative Christian nonprofit in Florida, threatened to sue Mount Horeb Area School District. The Liberty Counsel claimed that the school district's decision to read I Am Jazz "substitutes the beliefs of the principal and school psychologist for those parents." Furthermore, Richard Mast, a Litigation Attorney with the Liberty Counsel, stated that the reading "undermines the privacy rights of students, the free speech rights of teachers..., and the religious rights of families."

Following the lawsuit threat, the school district received support from many organizations, including the National Coalition Against Censorship, the Human Rights Campaign, the National Education Association, the Comic Book Legal Defense Fund, Americans United for Separation of Church and State, American Booksellers for Free Expression, National Council of Teachers of English, Association of American Publishers, PEN American Center, and the Society of Children's Book Writers and Illustrators. A letter co-signed by the above organizations stated:

The objecting parents may prefer that their children not be aware of the existence of non-gender-conforming children, but that is not an option: such a child is a student in their midst, with whom they must learn to interact. Her parents have rights equivalent to those of objecting parents, including the right for their child to receive an education that offers the same respect and dignity accorded all other children.

Two weeks after the originally scheduled event, members of Mount Horeb High School's Sexuality and Gender Alliance (SAGA), as well as 200 supporters, gathered around the school's flagpole to read I Am Jazz.

Later that week, nearly 600 people gathered at the area's public library for a reading by co-author Jessica Hershel. The Human Rights Campaign donated forty copies of I Am Jazz for the event.

Following the event, the district released the following statement: "Let the word go forth here and now that this board will stand united and we will not be intimidated and we will teach tolerance and will be accepting to everyone."

=== Support from the Human Rights Campaign ===
Following the Mount Horeb event, the Human Rights Campaign Foundation's Welcoming Schools program has continued to show support for I Am Jazz.

On January 14, 2016, the program hosted readings of I Am Jazz in schools, community centers, and churches in eight states.

On December 17, 2017, the HRC and NEA hosted a "I Am Jazz" day wherein 400 U.S. communities read I Am Jazz.

In 2020, over 26,000 people participated in more than 300 readings across the United States, with one of the readings being I Am Jazz.

== Translations ==
In 2022, three major Israeli LGBTQ+ organizations (The Aguda, Gila Project and Hoshen) collaborated on translating the book into Hebrew, and in March the book was published The book is also available in Icelandic, translated by Birna Björg Guðmundsdóttir and published in 2022.
