= Kiese Laymon =

American writer and professor (born 1974)

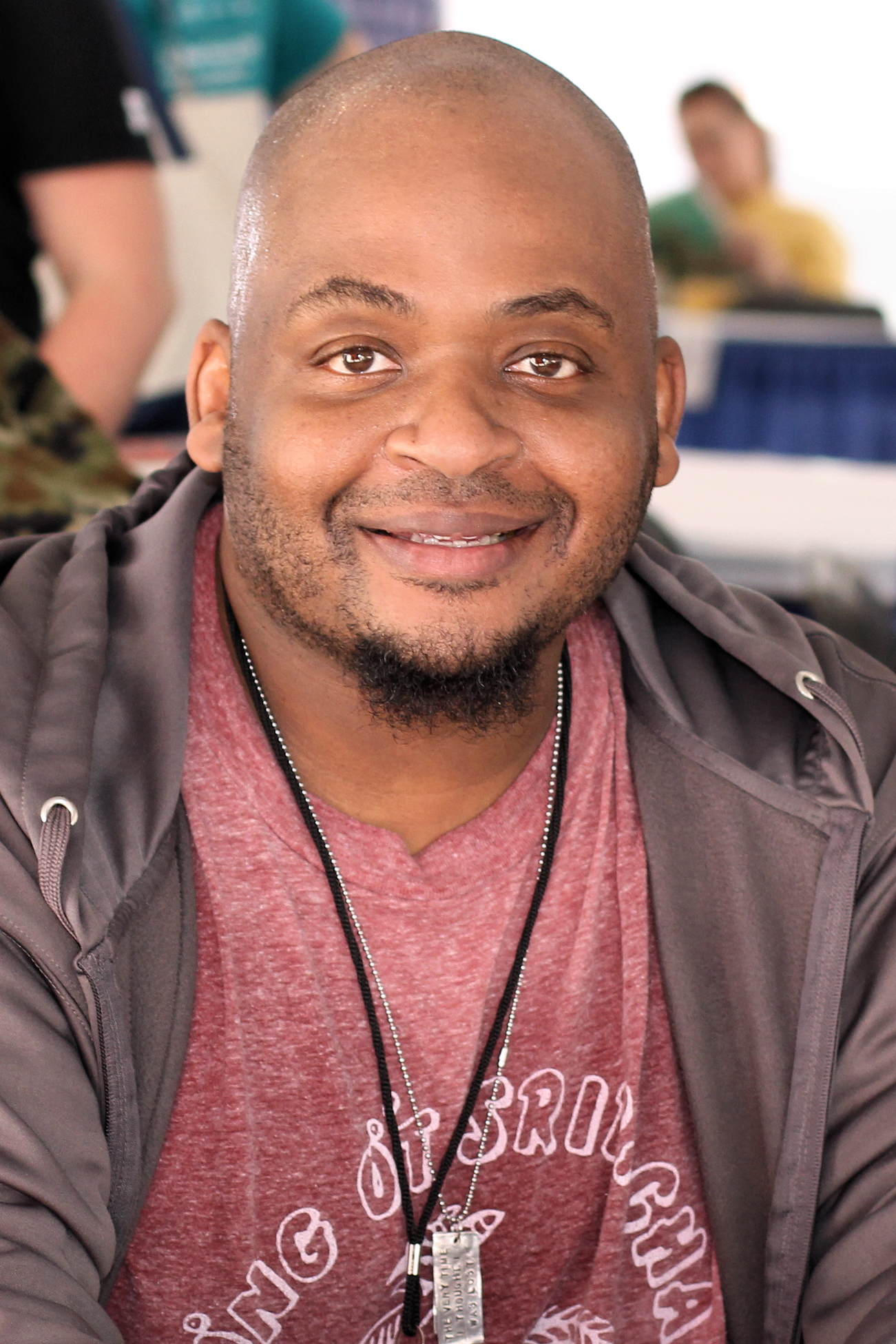
- Laymon at the 2018 Texas Book Festival
- Born: August 15, 1974 (age 52); Jackson, Mississippi, U.S.
- Education: Oberlin College (BA); Indiana University Bloomington (MFA)
- Occupations: Writer; editor; professor
- Website: kieselaymon.com

Kiese Laymon (born August 15, 1974, in Jackson, Mississippi) is an American writer. He is a professor of English and Creative Writing at Rice University. He is the author of three full-length books: a novel, Long Division (2013), and two memoirs, How to Slowly Kill Yourself and Others in America (2013) and the award-winning Heavy: An American Memoir (2018). Laymon was awarded a MacArthur Fellowship in 2022.

== Early life and education ==
Laymon was born and raised in Mississippi. He earned his Bachelor of Arts degree at Oberlin College, and his Master's in Fine Arts at Indiana University. He also attended Jackson State University, where his mother worked as a political science professor, and Millsaps College, where he was suspended for a year after taking a library book without checking it out. His suspension followed ongoing criticism from the administration, including president George Harmon, who believed his controversial pieces on race in the school newspaper adversely affected campus and alumni relations.

== Writing career ==
Laymon detailed his experience of racism at Millsaps, and as a coming-of-age black man in Mississippi, in his essay for Gawker, "How to Slowly Kill Yourself and Others in America". The essay was widely read and attracted both positive and negative comments on his portrayal of his racial experiences. "How to Slowly Kill Yourself and Others" was eventually included in his book of autobiographical essays by the same name.

His 2018 memoir, Heavy: An American Memoir, deals with his difficult relationship with his mother—who instilled in him a love of reading and skill in writing, but who was in an abusive relationship, lived on very little money, and beat him with the justification that he needed to be tough enough for a white world that would treat him even more harshly—as well as his subsequent unhealthy relationships with food and gambling. It also deals with American racism, feminism, family, masculinity, geography, hip hop, and Southern black life. His blog, Cold Drank, features essays and short fiction as well as pieces written by guest contributors. Laymon has written essays and stories for publications including Gawker, ESPN.com, The Washington Post, The New York Times, NPR, BuzzFeed, and The Guardian.

Writing for NPR, Martha Anne Toll described Laymon as "a star in the American literary firmament, with a voice that is courageous, honest, loving, and singularly beautiful. Heavy is at once a paean to the Deep South, a condemnation of our fat-averse culture, and a brilliantly rendered memoir of growing up black, and bookish, and entangled in a family that is as challenging as it is grounding."

While he was living and writing in upstate New York, as a professor at Vassar College, Laymon's refusal to omit explicit aspects of Long Division that explore racial politics prolonged negotiations with a major publishing group. His books were eventually picked up by the independent publisher Agate Publishing, which released his debut novel in June 2013.

In addition to Laymon's satirical time-travel novel Long Division, his book of autobiographical essays, How to Slowly Kill Yourself and Others in America, was published by Agate in August 2013.

== Academia ==
Laymon was an associate professor of English and Africana Studies at Vassar College, then became a professor of Creative Writing in the MFA program at the University of Mississippi.

As of 2022, he is professor of English and Creative Writing at Rice University.

== Awards and recognition ==
=== Nominations and wins ===
Year	Title	Award	Category	Result	Ref
2018	Heavy: An American Memoir	Barnes & Noble Discover Great New Writers Award	Nonfiction	Won	
2018	Heavy: An American Memoir	Kirkus Prize	Nonfiction	Finalist	
2018	Heavy: An American Memoir	Los Angeles Times Book Prize	Christopher Isherwood Prize	Won	
2019	Heavy: An American Memoir	Andrew Carnegie Medal for Excellence	Nonfiction	Won	
2019	Heavy: An American Memoir	Chautauqua Prize	—	Shortlisted	
2019	Heavy: An American Memoir	Hurston/Wright Legacy Award	Nonfiction	Finalist	
2019	Heavy: An American Memoir	Indies Choice Book Awards	Adult Nonfiction	Honors	

=== Fellowships ===
- 2013 & 2014: Member of The Root 100, a "list of the 100 most important black influencers between the ages of 25 and 45"
- 2022: MacArthur Fellows Program

== Selected works ==
=== Novels ===
- —— (2013). Long Division (paperback ed.). Agate Bolden. ISBN 9781932841725.

=== Memoirs ===
- —— (2013). How to Slowly Kill Yourself and Others in America (paperback ed.). Agate Bolden. ISBN 9781932841770.
- —— (2018). Heavy: An American Memoir (hardcover 1st ed.). Scribner. ISBN 9781501125652.
