= Sorrows of Stephen =

Sorrows of Stephen is a play by Peter Parnell, and was originally published in 1980. The original production was at the New York Shakespeare Festival.

== Synopsis ==
In the first scene, Stephen reads The Sorrows of Young Werther. He meets a bum on the street while trying to hail a taxi, and the bum turns out to be Howard Fishbein, who he knew in high school. They briefly discuss Stephen's book. Howard shows that he has a gun, explains that his girlfriend has left him, and he tells Stephen he might use the gun on himself. Stephen tells him not to and leaves, accidentally driving away in a taxi with Howard's gun.

In the next scene, Stephen's girlfriend Liz leaves him. He returns to his apartment to find her moving out. He brings her flowers and chocolates, but she doesn't really appreciate, saying it isn't special because he brings her flowers every day. He makes her write down the phone number of where she'll be staying, but when he calls the number after she leaves, he finds that she wrote down a different number. So Stephen is now depressed. He decides to go to the opera date they had by himself. In the taxi he takes to the opera, he asks the female driver to change the radio station to listen to the beginning of the Mozart opera. They converse about the fact that she's a female taxi driver, he asks if she gets hit on by a lot of men, and she says yes sometimes, but that she only picks up men she thinks she'll like. Stephen immediately asks if she wants to go to the opera with him, but she turns him down because she has to work. He gets out at the opera, and leaves his book in the taxi. The driver picks it up.

While watching the opera, he passes a note to the woman sitting in front of him. She and her date get up and leave.

Stephen talks to his friend William about how he feels. He explains that this just keeps happening. William is concerned about Stephen. William is in a relationship with Christine. They've been together for six months, and William tells Stephen how he thinks he will marry her. Stephen mentions that he knows Christine just well enough to know that likes her. William agrees that she is a fantastic girl.

As a rebound, Stephen has a short fling with a waitress named Sophia Pickle from a diner he eats in. When they wake up in his apartment, she tells him that he seems lonely. He agrees. He tells her he is afraid be alone; she says that he isn't alone; he counters with the fact that he will be when she leaves.

Stephen goes to the Plaza Hotel to have lunch with Mrs. X, the woman he met at the opera. William and Christine are set to have a lunch date, but William is quite late, and Stephen decides to jump on the opportunity, having lunch with Christine and leaving no note for Mrs. X. They have a nice lunch and become interested in each other. Stephen, having gotten another copy of Sorrows of Young Werther, gives it to Christine. William then rushes in, apologizing that he is late, and they all walk to a park across the street.

Stephen leaves the other two alone as they walk, and Christine asks William if he wants to get married. He says, yes, but not just yet. They start to walk to the zoo, and Christine realizes she has left the book that Stephen lent her. She returns to the park bench to find a note telling her specific lines to read in the book, signed “Love, Stephen.” She smiles and walks away. Stephen has been watching from the bushes.

In an almost identical situation, William then interacts with the bum Howard Fishbein, who threatens with him a gun for money. Howard recognizes him as a radio personality. He reveals that his gun is actually a comb, Stephen having taken the real one. William catches a taxi.

Stephen and Christine are very in love. He brings her a cabbage, imitating what two characters in Sorrows of Young Werther do, and Christine reminds him that the character gives an orange, not a cabbage. He isn't too fazed, and they (mostly Stephen) have lengthy conversation about how they like each other and what to do about William.

William and Stephen have lunch together, and William tries to explain to Stephen that he thinks Christine is having an affair. It is quite apparent that Stephen is the culprit, revealing facts like that he met her at the Minimalist exhibit in the Metropolitan Museum of Art, and that she is “very much like Christine.”

Then, in another visit to the opera, Christine sits between Stephen and William, holding hands with William. The same woman (Mrs. X) and man sit in front of them. Stephen writes a note and asks Christine to pass it to the man. William sees this, angrily asks Stephen if this is the man, he says it must be, and William punches the man. William and Christine have a romantic evening, and he eventually confronts her about being with another man, which she confesses to, but will not reveal his identity. William proposes to Christine, and says that it must end with this other man.

Stephen and Christine go on a date to an art museum, and Christine tells him that she is marrying William and they must end their affair. Stephen is very distressed by this. Just as they are kissing goodbye, William enters, realizes it's Stephen, and punches him.

William and Stephen ride in the back of the same taxi with the female driver, and William tells Stephen that he will have to forget about Christine. He offers for Stephen to stay at their house because he's worried about him, but Stephen won't. He gets of the taxi, and the driver returns the copy of Sorrows of Young Werther he left before.

Back at his apartment, Stephen struggles to write a note to Christine, and eventually settles on leaving another book page reference and the words “There is no hope.” He reads out of his book how the character eventually commits suicide. He readies a situation exactly the same way, and puts the gun from Howard Fishbein to his temple. Just as he is about to pull the trigger, Christine knocks on the door. She apologizes, consoles him, and leaves.

Stephen gets a smile on his face, pulls out a card from his desk. It has a message from Mrs. X apologizing for missing their lunch date and has her phone number. He calls Mrs. X and asks her to a date at the Plaza Hotel.

Howard Fishbein is hailing a taxi, not looking like a bum anymore. Stephen and he converse, and Howard explains that he has sold the stories he's been writing, he and his high school sweetheart Marissa are seeing each other again, and he's successful overall. Stephen mentions that he has something of Howard's in his apartment (referring to the gun), and Howard says he won't be needing it. Stephen saunters off to greet the new day.

== Production history ==
Sorrows of Stephen debuted in a workshop at The Other Stage at The Public Theater in October 1979, and transferred to its world premiere production at the Theatre Cabaret at The Public Theater that November. The premiere was presented by Joseph Papp and directed by Sheldon Larry. The cast included John Shea, John Del Regno, Sherry Steiner, Kathy McKenna, William Duff-Griffin, Barbara Williams, Richard Backus, Anne De Salvo, and Pamela Reed. It ran 167 performances.

Other productions include

- November 1980 at Portland Stage Company
- January 1981 at Capital Repertory Theatre, directed by Barbara Rosoff and starring Cotter Smith, Shaw Purnell and John Griesemer
- 1983 at Berkshire Theatre Festival
- 1984 at Burt Reynolds Dinner Theatre (now Maltz Jupiter Theatre) starring Adam Arkin
