= No Ashes in the Fire =

2018 memoir by Darnell L. Moore

- Author: Darnell L. Moore
- Language: English
- Publisher: Nation Books
- Publication date: May 29, 2018
- Publication place: United States
- Pages: 257
- ISBN: 978-1-568-58834-6
- OCLC: 1035947395

No Ashes in the Fire: Coming of Age Black and Free in America is a 2018 memoir by American writer and activist Darnell L. Moore. It explore Moore's experiences growing up in poverty in New Jersey, and his struggles with his personal identity as both black and queer.

== Overview ==
No Ashes in the Fire follows Moore's early life, growing up black and queer, born to teenage parents and living in poverty in Camden, New Jersey. It explores Moore's struggle with his racial identity against the popular expectation of "little more than anger from black boys", and his sexual identity in against the popular notion of "black men as symbols of hyper-heterosexuality".

The book recalls a history of bullying and discrimination, including the event from which its title is drawn, where local boys doused him in gasoline, and attempted to burn him alive. It follows through the throes of the AIDS epidemic in the US, and explores the breadth of Moore's life from his abusive father, to his untimely heart attack at age 19, which served as his later inspiration.

== Reception ==
Kirkus Reviews call No Ashes in the Fire "an engaging meditation on identity and creativity," while Publishers Weekly dubbed it "a stunning tribute to affirmation, forgiveness, and healing", and an "invigorating emotional tonic". In their interview with Moore, The Philadelphia Inquirer introduced it as both compelling and vulnerable, "glorious and traumatic".

== See also ==
- Homophobia in ethnic minority communities
- List of LGBT writers
