= Two Boys Kissing =

2013 young adult novel written by American author David Levithan

- First edition cover
- Author: David Levithan
- Language: English
- Genre: Young adult fiction
- Published: 2013
- Publisher: Alfred A. Knopf
- Publication place: United States
- Pages: 224
- ISBN: 9780307931900

Two Boys Kissing is a 2013 young adult novel written by American author David Levithan. The book follows two 17-year-old boys who set out to break a Guinness World Record by kissing for 32 hours. The book includes a "Greek chorus" of the generation of gay men who died of AIDS. Throughout the narrative, the book discusses topics such as relationships, coming out, gender identity, and hook-up culture.

Two Boys Kissing was named a 2014 Stonewall Honor Book for Children's and Young Adult books, and landed on the 2013 National Book Award Longlist for Young People's Literature.

== Reception ==
=== Awards ===
In 2013, Two Boys Kissing received the following awards and accolades:

- Lambda Literary awarded it a Lammy in Children/Young Adult Literature. This is awarded based on a book's literary merit and content related to LGBT+ lives.
- The National Book Foundation placed it on the 2013 National Book Award Longlist for Young People's Literature. Judges bestow this honor upon books they deem "the best literature in America" and which "have a prominent place in American culture."
- Readers nominated it for a Goodreads Choice Award for Young Adult Fiction. Goodreads Choice Awards are the only awards chosen by readers.

In 2014, Two Boys Kissing received the following awards and accolades:

- The American Library Association named it a 2014 Stonewall Honor Book for Children's and Young Adult books. This award is given to "English-language works of exceptional merit relating to the gay, lesbian, bisexual and transgender experience."
- State Library Victoria nominated it for the Silver Inky Award.
- The Milwaukee County Federated Library System Young Adult Services Committee (MCFLS YASC) nominated it for the Milwaukee County Teen Book Award. This award is provided to quality books published for teen readers.
- The New Atlantic Independent Booksellers Association (NAIBA) named it a 2014 NAIBA Young Adult Book of the Year. This award recognizes an author who lived in the New Atlantic or a book that takes place in the region. Booksellers nominate and vote upon titles and award one book the Book of the Year Award in five categories (fiction, nonfiction, young adult, middle grade, and picture).

=== Challenges ===
Two Boys Kissing has frequently been challenged. According to the American Library Association's Office of Intellectual Freedom, Two Boys Kissing was the 18th-most banned and challenged book in the United States between 2010 and 2019. Additionally, it topped the organization's top ten list three times: 2015, 2016, and 2018 because of homosexual and sexually-explicit content, as well as because it condones public displays of affection.

In 2014, a parent of a child at Fauquier County High School appealed for Two Boys Kissing to be removed from the school district's libraries because of the cover artwork, which shows two boys kissing, which violates the school's rules against public displays of affection, as well as because the book has 117 references to words like "sex" and "kiss." A public hearing with the Fauquier County School Board led to a committee unanimously deciding that the book would remain on the shelves.

On October 19, 2018, religious activist Robert Dorr borrowed four LGBT+ books from the Orange City Public Library in Orange City, Iowa (including Levithan's Two Boys Kissing) and proceeded to burn the books while streaming the video on social media. Dorr claimed he was "exercis[ing] his freedom of speech and the freedom of [his] Biblical faith." In 2019, Dorr was convicted of fifth-degree criminal mischief for destroying library property.

In 2022, Two Boys Kissing was listed among 52 books banned by the Alpine School District following the implementation of Utah law H.B. 374, “Sensitive Materials In Schools," 42% of which “feature LBGTQ+ characters and or themes.” Many of the books were removed because they were considered to contain pornographic material according to the new law, which defines porn using the following criteria:

- "The average person" would find that the material, on the whole, "appeals to prurient interest in sex"
- The material "is patently offensive in the description or depiction of nudity, sexual conduct, sexual excitement, sadomasochistic abuse, or excretion"
- The material, on the whole, "does not have serious literary, artistic, political or scientific value."
