= Darnell L. Moore =

American writer and activist (born 1976)

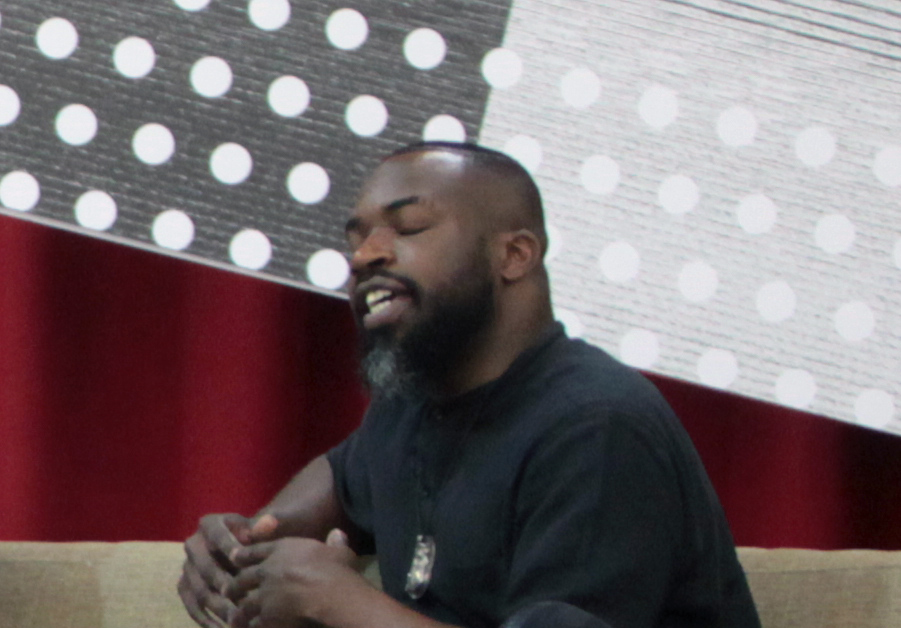
- Born: January 24, 1976 (age 50)
- Occupations: Writer, activist
- Years active: 1999-present

Darnell L. Moore (born January 24, 1976) is an American writer and activist whose work is informed by anti-racist, feminist, queer of color, and anti-colonial thought and advocacy. Darnell's essays, social commentary, poetry, and interviews have appeared in various national and international media venues, including the Feminist Wire, Ebony magazine, The Huffington Post, The New York Times, and The Advocate.

== Career ==
Moore is an Editorial Collective Member of the Feminist Wire and co-author, with former NFL player Wade Davis, II, of a bi-monthly column on The Huffington Post Gay Voices focused on black manhood and queer politics titled "Tongues Untied." Moore has served appointments as a visiting fellow at Yale Divinity School and a visiting scholar at the Center for the Study of Gender and Sexuality at New York University and has served as a lecturer at Rutgers University and The City College of New York (CUNY). Moore is a board member of the Center for Lesbian and Gay Studies at CUNY and The Tobago Center for Study and Practice of Indigenous Spirituality. He has interviewed Frank Mugisha, Steve Harper, Cheryl Clarke (Lambda Literary), Amiri Baraka and Mayor Cory Booker. Moore is part of the Audre Lorde Human Rights Speaker Series at The Sexuality, Gender & Human Rights Program at Harvard Kennedy School, CARR Center for Human RIghts Policy

Moore's memoir, No Ashes in the Fire, a “critically-acclaimed memoir about growing up black and queer in New Jersey in the ’80s”, was released in 2018. The book was selected as A New York Times Notable Book of the Year and won the Lambda Literary Award for Gay Memoir/Biography.

Moore is now a Director of Inclusion for Content and Marketing at Netflix. He hosts the podcast, Being Seen, which focusses on the gay and queer Black male experience.

== Citations ==
- Moore's work on "complex relationships between race and sexuality in the black community" cited in Patrick S. Cheng's Radical Love: An Introduction to Queer Theology, 2011.

== Palestinian solidarity work ==
- Moore is a member of the International Committee on Queer BDS and Pinkwashing for World Social Forum 2013.

== Personal life ==
Moore is queer.

== Honors and awards ==
- 2012: American Conference on Diversity, Humanitarian Award – for his advocacy in the city of Newark where he served as Chair of the LGBTQ Concerns Advisory Commission under the auspices of Mayor Cory A. Booker
- 2012: Rutgers University LGBTQ and Diversity Resource Center, Outstanding Academic Leadership Award – with Prof. Beryl Satter, for their work on developing the Queer Newark Oral History Project
- First Annual Episcopal Diocese of Newark's Dr. Louie Crew Scholarship for individuals and groups working "at the intersection of sexuality and faith."
- In June 2019, to mark the 50th anniversary of the Stonewall Riots, sparking the start of the modern LGBTQ rights movement, Queerty named him one of the Pride50 “trailblazing individuals who actively ensure society remains moving towards equality, acceptance and dignity for all queer people.

== Works and publications ==
=== Books ===
- Schmidt, Nicolaus; Moore, Darnell L.; Walz, Udo (2013). Moore, Darnell L. (ed.). Astor Place, Broadway, New York: a universe of hairdressers = Astor Place, Broadway, New York: ein Universum der Friseure (in German and English). Bielefeld, Germany: Kerber. ISBN 978-3-866-78806-0. OCLC 1016978689.
- Moore, Darnell L. (2018). No Ashes in the Fire: Coming of Age Black and Free in America. New York: Nation Books. ISBN 978-1-568-58834-6. OCLC 1035947395.

=== Articles ===
- Moore, Darnell L. (December 8, 2012). "Premeditated Manslaughter: Notes From a Black Male Suicide Survivor". Gawker.
- Atshan, Sa’ed; Moore, Darnell L. (2014). "Reciprocal Solidarity: Where the Black and Palestinian Queer Struggles Meet". Biography. 37 (2): 680–705. doi:10.1353/bio.2014.0033.
- Moore, Darnell L. (October 2, 2015). "Don't Pity the Subject Being Smashed, Rage at the Object Doing the Smashing". PEN America.
- Moore, Darnell L. (October 5, 2015). "The Disregarded Consequences of Gentrification in This New York City Neighborhood". Mic.
- Moore, Darnell L. (October 23, 2015). "Urban Spaces and the Mattering of Black Lives". The Nature of Cities.
- Moore, Darnell L. (May 30, 2018). "Lost in the Blinding Whiteness of My First Semester of College". Literary Hub.
- Moore, Darnell L. (June 25, 2019) "The Gentrification of Queerness". The Nation.

== See also ==
- LGBT culture in New York City
- List of LGBT people from New York City
