= Henry Cole (illustrator) =

American author and illustrator of children's books

- Born: 1955 (age 70–71); Purcellville, Virginia
- Education: Virginia Tech (1978?-1982)
- Occupation: Illustrator
- Years active: 1998-

Henry Cole (born 1955) is an American author and illustrator of children's books. He has illustrated several books for many authors including Julie Andrews Edwards, Lester Laminack, Erica Perl, Margie Palatini, Alyssa Capucilli, Harvey Fierstein, and Pamela Duncan Edwards.

== Background ==
Henry Cole, born 1955 near Purcellville, Virginia, United States, most often uses a cartoon-like style with vivid colors and primarily works in acrylics and colored pencils.

Cole grew up on a dairy farm in Virginia. He enjoyed art as a child and frequently made birthday cards for friends or signs for school functions He later went on to study Forestry at Virginia Polytechnic Institute and State University. He never received formal art training, but his mother was an illustrator who gave him advice throughout his career.

== Work ==
Before Cole was an illustrator, he taught science at The Langley School in Virginia from 1984 to 1999. He frequently used art to illustrate a concept during his classes. As an elementary school teacher, Cole often had the opportunity to hear visiting authors and illustrators speak, and thought that he might be interested in pursuing book illustration as a career.

Cole has collaborated with many authors as well as celebrities such as Julie Andrews and Harvey Fierstein. The Sissy Duckling (2002), written by Fierstein, was a Lambda Literary Award Finalist in 2002 Some of Cole's most famous works are Moosestache (1999) written by Margie Palatini, Mooseletoe (2000) written by Margie Palatini, Big Chickens (2008) written by Leslie Helakoski, and Honk! The Story of a Prima Swanerina (2000) written by Pamela Duncan Edwards, which has recently been made into an animated video by Disney.

Some criticism has been received for And Tango Makes Three (2005), for which Cole was the illustrator. The book is about the true story of two male penguins that raised a chick together in the Central Park Zoo in New York City. Afraid that the book promotes homosexuality, many schools have categorized this book as nonfiction rather than juvenile fiction. The Library of Congress, however, continues to categorize this work as juvenile fiction. Cole's illustrations for this work and several others have been recognized for their realistic nature which is in contrast to his usual trend of cartoon-like illustrations. In a review of And Tango Makes Three, Booklist contributor Jennifer Mattson states that "Cole's pictures complement the perfectly cadenced text".

Cole's many books are well reviewed. Booklist's review of Katy Duck is a Caterpillar (2009), written by Alyssa Satin Capucilli states that, "The...comedic color drawings translate Katy's longing and disappointment and will easily appeal to young children". Cole has also received praise for his illustrations in Tubby the Tuba (2006), written by Paul Tripp. Children's book reviewer Carolyn Phelan for Booklist states, "Cole's colorful retro-style artwork endows the instrument-characters great emotional expressiveness. He uses the large format to good advantage, creating scenes that are varied in their effects and show up well from a distance". Cole's usual whimsical, cartoon-like style with vivid colors and limited white space not only helps to enhance the story by adding character elements; it also draws young readers in.

In addition to illustrating for other writers, Cole has also written and authored fifteen children's books. I Took a Walk (1998) and On the Way to the Beach (2003) both depict things one might find while walking through nature. A Kirkus Reviews contributor wrote that On the Way to the Beach had "marvelously detailed and accurate illustrations [that] give readers a peek into the natural world". In an additional review for On the Way to the Beach Carolyn Phelan for Booklist states that, "Parents looking for an early introduction to nature study will find this an informative offering with a playful approach". On Meadowview Street (2007) is about a girl named Caroline who decides to stop mowing her lawn and let it grow into a field of wildflowers. A Publishers Weekly critic described the illustrations as "beautifully portrayed in meticulously detailed, velvety acrylics". Jennifer Mattson from Booklist stated, "The jab at soulless suburbia and its faux-bucolic trappings may be most appreciated by adults, but the crucial message ... will speak strongly to today’s ecologically aware children. And it's all done without stridency". All of the books end with a spread containing panels of wildlife seen in the book. Released in early 2010, A Nest for Celeste is Cole's latest foray into writing, and was received with great acclaim. About a mouse looking for a place she can call home, the book also teaches about the work of naturalist John James Audubon as Celeste makes friends with his young apprentice. Amazon.com featured it as a Best Book of the Month in March and a starred review by Publishers Weekly stated that "Evocative illustrations, compelling characters, and thoughtful reflections on the nature of home combine to powerful effect."

One notable title, "Unspoken," (2012) has received numerous awards: NY Times Best Picture Books, ALA Notable Book, Chicago Public Library Best of the Best, 2012 Upstanders Award, Virginia Jefferson Cup Award, Jr. Library Guild Selection, Parents Choice Gold Award, SLJ Best Book, Publishers Weekly Best Books, White Ravens of 2013, Bank Street College of Education Best Children's Books, NCTE Notable Books in Language Arts, and Pennsylvania Keystone to Reading Award.

In an interview with HarperCollins, Cole stated "Your own book is your own baby. I think it's more fulfilling to both write and illustrate a book. However, it can be more fun and stimulating to collaborate with another person and create something jointly".

== Personal ==
As a child, Cole grew up on a dairy farm and enjoyed being outdoors. His love for the outdoors is what eventually led him to study science. He has said that he spent a "lifetime" observing things in nature such as birds and leaves which has made art easier. He has also stated that he hopes to do more environmental books in the future. Cole is also inspired by artists Norman Rockwell, Paul Klee, John Singer Sargent, and N.C. Wyeth.

== Publications ==
=== Written and illustrated by Cole ===
- Jack's Garden, 1998
- I Took a Walk, 1998
- On the Way to the Beach, 2003
- On Meadowview Street, 2007
- Trudy, 2009
- A Nest for Celeste, 2010
- Littlest Evergreen, 2011
- Unspoken, 2012
- Big Bug, 2014
- Brambleheart, 2016
- Somewhat True Adventures of Sammy Shine, 2016
- Spot, the Cat, 2016
- Eddie the Bully, 2016
- Bayberry Island,2017
- Another quest for Celeste, 2018
- One Little Bag: An Amazing Journey, 2018
- Try A Little Kindness, 2018
- Spot and Dot, 2019
- Nesting,2020
- Principal Tate is Running Late!,2021
- Homer on the Case, 2021
- Building, 2022
- Forever Home, 2022
- Adventure Awaits, 2022
- "Albert's ABC's", 2024

=== Illustrated by Cole ===
- Moosetache Margie Palatini
- Zipping, Zapping, Zooming Bats (written by Ann Earle) (1995)
- Four Famished Foxes and Fosdyke (written by Pamela Duncan Edwards) (1995)
- Dinorella: A Prehistoric Fairy Tale (written by Pamela Duncan Edwards) (1997)
- Warthogs in the Kitchen by Pamela Duncan Edwards (1998)
- Livingstone Mouse by Pamela Duncan Edwards (1998)
- Barefoot: Escape on the Underground Railroad by Pamela Duncan Edwards (1998)
- Some Smug Slug by Pamela Duncan Edwards (1998)
- Wacky Wedding: A Book of Alphabet Antics by Pamela Duncan Edwards (1999)
- Ed and Fred Flea by Pamela Duncan Edwards (1999)
- Little Bo by Julie Andrews Edwards (1997)
- Who Bop? (written by Jonathan London) (2000)
- Roar! A Noisy Counting Book (written by Pamela Duncan Edwards) (2000)
- Bravo, Livingstone Mouse! (written by Pamela Duncan Edwards) (2000)
- Little Dogs Say “Rough!” (written by Rick Walton) (2000)
- Honk! The Story of a Prima Swanerina (written by Pamela Duncan Edwards) (2000)
- Mooseltoe written by Margie Palatini) (2000)
- All American Puppies #6: Bake-off Burglar by Susan Saunders (2001)
- All American Puppies #5: Puppysaurus by Susan Saunders (2001)
- All American Puppies #4: Uptown Poodle, Downtown Pups by Susan Saunders (2001)
- All American Puppies #3: Camp Barkalot by Susan Saunders (2001)
- All American Puppies #2: On the Scent of Trouble by Susan Saunders (2001)
- All American Puppies #1: New Pup on the Block by Susan Saunders (2001)
- Warthogs Paint by Pamela Duncan Edwards (2001)
- Wake-Up Kisses by Pamela Duncan Edwards (2001)
- Slop Goes the Soup: A Noisy Warthog Word Book by Pamela Duncan Edwards (2001)
- Boston Tea Party by Pamela Duncan Edwards (2001)
- Warthogs in a Box: Counting, Colors, Sounds by Pamela Duncan Edwards (2002)
- Fright Night Flight by Laura Krauss Melmed (2002)
- Can You Make a Piggy Giggle? by Linda Ashman (2002)
- Muldoon by Pamela Duncan Edwards (2002)
- Little Bo in France by Julie Andrews Edwards (2002)
- The Sissy Duckling by Harvey Fierstein (2002)
- The Wright Brothers by Pamela Duncan Edwards (2003)
- Why Do Kittens Purr? by Marion Dane Bauer (2003)
- Rosie's Roses by Pamela Duncan Edwards (2003)
- City Chicken by Arthur Dorros (2003)
- Naughty Little Monkeys by Jim Aylesworth (2003)
- Bad Boys by Margie Palatini (2003)
- The Worrywarts by Pamela Duncan Edwards (2003)
- Gigi and Lulu's Gigantic Fight by Pamela Duncan Edwards (2004)
- The Leprechaun's Gold by Pamela Duncan Edwards (2004)
- Santa's Stuck by Rhonda Gowler Greene (2004)
- Moosekitos by Margie Palatini (2004)
- Victor Vito and Freddie Vasco: Two Polar Bears on a Mission to Save the Klondike by Laurie Berkner (2004)
- Clara Caterpillar by Pamela Duncan Edwards (2004)
- And Tango Makes Three by Justin Richardson and Peter Parnall (2005)
- Ms. Bitsy Bat's Kindergarten by Pamela Duncan Edwards (2005)
- Z is for Zookeeper by Marie and Roland Smith (2005)
- Tubby the Tuba by Paul Tripp (2006)
- Bad Boys Get Cookie! by Margie Palatini (2006)
- Big Chickens by Leslie Helakoski (mother of Connor Helakoski) (2006)
- Shiver Me Letters: A Pirate ABC by June Sobel (2006)
- Oink? by Margie Palatini (2006)
- Katy Duck, Big Sister: A Book About Sharing by Alyssa Satin Capucilli (2007)
- Katy Duck by Alyssa Satin Capucilli (2007)
- The Old House by Pamela Duncan Edwards (2007)
- Chaucer's First Winter by Stephen Krensky (2008)
- Jack and Jill's Treehouse by Pamela Duncan Edwards (2008)
- Rubber-legged Ducky by John Keller (2008)
- Katy Duck, Center Stage by Alyssa Satin Capucilli (2008)
- Katy Duck, Dance Star by Alyssa Satin Capucilli (2008)
- Twelve Days of Christmas in Virginia by Sue Corbet (2009)
- Mouse Was Mad by Linda Urban (2009)
- Chicken Butt! by Erica S. Perl (2009)
- Bad Boys Get Henpecked by Margie Palatini (2009)
- Katy Duck is a Caterpillar by Alyssa Satin Capucilli (2009)
- Big Chickens Go To Town by Leslie Helakoski (2010)
- Big Chickens Fly the Coop by Leslie Helakoski (2010)
- Katy Duck Goes to Dance Class by Alyssa Satin Capucilli (2010)
- One Pup's Up by Marsha Wilson Chall (2010)
- Little Bo in Italy by Julie Andrews Edwards (2010)
- Chicken Butt's Back by Erica S. Perl (2011)
- Three Hens and a Peacock by Lester Laminack (2011)
- Starring Katy Duck by Alyssa Satin Capucilli (2011)
- I Know a Wee Piggy by Kim Norman (2012)
- Who's Who by Ken Geist (2012)
- Surfer Chick by Kristy Dempsey (2012)
- Little Bo in London by Julie Andrews Edwards (2012)
- Katy Duck Makes a Friend by Alyssa Satin Capucilli (2012)
- Katy Duck Meets the Babysitter by Alyssa Satin Capucilli (2012)
- Katy Duck and the Tip Top Tap Shoes by Alyssa Satin Capucilli (2013)
- Katy Duck, Flower Girl by Alyssa Satin Capucilli (2013)
- Bogart and Vinnie by Audrey Vernick (2013)
- Nelly May Has Her Say by Cynthia DeFelice (2013)
- Prairie Chicken Little by Jackie Mims Hopkins (2013)
- Katy Duck and the Secret Valentine by Alyssa Satin Capucilli (2014)
- Katy Duck Goes to Work by Alyssa Satin Capucilli (2014)
- Katy Duck's Happy Halloween by Alyssa Satin Capucilli (2014)
- Maxi the Taxi by Elizabeth Upton (2016)
- Ralph and the Rocket Ship by Alyssa Satin Capucilli (2016)
- Ferocious Fluffity by Erica Perl (2016)
- Teeny Tiny Halloween by Lauren Wohl (2016)
- Emmett and the Bright Blue Cape by Alyssa Satin Capucilli (2017)
- Three Hens, A Peacock and The Enormous Egg by Lester L. Laminack (2023)
- Carina Felina by Carmen Agra Deedy (2023)
