= Susan Kuklin =

US-American photographer and writer

Susan Kuklin (born 1941) is an US-American photographer and award-winning writer.

Kuklin was born and raised in Philadelphia, Pennsylvania, then studied theater at New York University and the Herbert Berghof School. After graduate school at NYU, Kuklin began studying photography.

== Career ==
Her nonfiction works frequently cover controversial topics (e.g., AIDS, poverty, and transgender youth), and often blend photography with writing.

Beyond Magenta has been the center of controversy because some considered it anti-family; it included offensive language, homosexuality, sex education, and political and religious viewpoints; and it was unsuited for age group. Librarians also noted that they wanted to "remove [the book] from collection to ward off complaints." According to the American Library Association, it was the 27th most banned and challenged book in the United States between 2010 and 2019. Furthermore, it was one of the top ten most challenged books in 2019 (2) and 2015 (4).

=== Awards ===
- Dance!, written with Bill T. Jones, was published September 15, 1998 by Hyperion Books for Children. The book was nominated for the Charlotte Zolotow Award for Highly Commended Title.
- Iqbal Masih and the Crusaders Against Child Slavery was published October 15, 1998 by Henry Holt and Co. and received the Flora Stieglitz Straus Award the same year.
- No Choirboy: Murder, Violence, and Teenagers on Death Row was published August 5, 2008 by Henry Holt and Co. The book received the following accolades:
  - American Library Association's (ALA) Quick Picks for Reluctant Young Adult Readers (2009)
  - ALA Best Books for Young Adults (2009)
  - Rhode Island Teen Book Award Nominee (2011)
  - Florida Teens Read Nominee (2010)
  - James Cook Book Award Nominee (2009)
- Beyond Magenta: Transgender Teens Speak Out was published February 11, 2014 by Candlewick Press. The book received the following accolades:
  - Kirkus Reviews Best Books of 2014
  - Flora Stieglitz Straus Award (2015)
  - Stonewall Book Award Nominee for Children’s and Young Adult Literature (2015)
  - Young Adult Library Services Association Nonfiction Award Nominee (2015)
  - Rhode Island Teen Book Award Nominee (2017)

== Works ==
- Taking My Cat to the Vet (1988)
- Going to My Ballet Class (1989)
- Going to My Nursery School (1990)
- Going to My Gymnastics Class (1991)
- How My Family Lives in America (1992)
- Fighting Fires (1993)
- After a Suicide (1994)
- From Head to Toe (1994)
- Fireworks: The Science, the Art, and the Magic (1996)
- Dance!, with Bill T. Jones (1998)
- Iqbal Masih and the Crusaders Against Child Slavery (1998)
- The Harlem Nutcracker, with Donald Byrd (2001)
- Hoops with Swoopes, illustrated by Sheryl Swoopes (2001)
- Trial: The Inside Story (2001)
- What Do I Do Now?: Talking about Teen Pregnancy (2001)
- From Wall to Wall (2002)
- All Aboard!: A True Train Story (2003)
- Families (2006)
- No Choirboy: Murder, Violence, and Teenagers on Death Row (2008)
- Beautiful Ballerina, with Marilyn Nelson (2009)
- Beyond Magenta: Transgender Teens Speak Out (2014)
- We Are Here to Stay: Voices of Undocumented Young Adults (2019)
- In Search of Safety: Voices of Refugees (2020)
