= Justin Richardson =

American children's book author

- Born: 1963 (age 62–63); New York City, U.S.
- Education: Harvard University
- Occupations: Author; psychiatrist
- Partner: Peter Parnell
- Children: 1
- Writing career
- Genre: Children's literature
- Notable work: And Tango Makes Three (2005)

Justin Richardson (born 1963) is an American author and psychiatrist best known for co-authoring And Tango Makes Three with Peter Parnell.

Richardson was profiled in The New York Times in 1997 in an article entitled "Elite Schools Face the Gay Issue." The article detailed his work with numerous New York independent schools (Trinity, Dalton, Brearley, and Spence are mentioned), speaking to teachers, students and parents about sexual orientation development in children and teens. "Dr. Richardson," the author wrote,"— pedigreed, carefully spoken, determinedly nonthreatening — has become the schools' gay issues consultant of choice. 'He's so sane, and he's so clear,' said Edes Gilbert, the head of Spence."

== Early life ==
Richardson was born in Greenwich Village, New York in 1963 and grew up in Rockland County, New York. He received his undergraduate, graduate, and medical degrees from Harvard. He was chief resident in psychiatry at McLean Hospital.

== Career ==
=== Medical ===
Richardson joined the faculty of Columbia University College of Physicians & Surgeons. In later years, Richardson was the psychiatric advisor for the second and third season of the HBO series In Treatment.

=== Writer ===
According to The New York Times, Richardson and pediatrician Mark Schuster M.D. Ph.D. were inspired by a parent's question at one of these schools to write their book Everything You Never Wanted Your Kids to Know About Sex (But Were Afraid They'd Ask) (Crown, 2003). "How can I teach my daughter to have a healthy attitude toward sex," the father had asked, "but prevent her from having any?" Publishers Weekly wrote that the authors "bring extraordinary expertise and scintillating intelligence to this guide to coping with a child's sexual maturation. Acknowledging that kids are" inherently sexual" (male fetuses, for example, have erections in utero), the authors show how parents can influence their children's sexual development in healthy ways through honest communication. With this forthright and reassuring volume, Richardson and Schuster prove themselves models of that skill."

Subsequent to the publication of the book, Richardson made numerous appearances as an expert on the Today Show, Good Morning America, 20/20, and CNN. His advice to parents appeared in The New York Times, Newsweek, and on NPR's Morning Edition.

In 2005, Richardson and the American playwright Peter Parnell published their first children's book, And Tango Makes Three (Simon and Schuster). The book tells the true story of two male penguins in the Central Park Zoo who pair-bonded, built a nest, and together hatched an egg. On its publication, The New York Times wrote, "And Tango Makes Three is bound to raise eyebrows, but for those of us eager to encourage our children to include, rather than exclude, it's a welcome addition to the library of families. The well-written, perfectly paced text is delivered with a deft touch by the collaborative team of Justin Richardson...and Peter Parnell."

The book received several awards, including the American Library Association Notable Book award and the ASPCA Henry Bergh Children's Book Award. However, one year after its publication, it became the single most banned or challenged book in the United States. According to the American Library Association, And Tango Makes Three was the most banned book in the country for the years 2006, 2007, 2008, and 2010. It was the number two most challenged book in 2009 and number five in 2012.

Parnell and Richardson also later collaborated on Christian, the Hugging Lion (Simon & Schuster), a children's picture book about the true story of Christian the lion.

== Personal life ==
Richardson lives in Greenwich Village with his partner, Peter Parnell, and their daughter.
