= George M. Johnson (writer) =

American author and activist

- Born: George Matthew Johnson; October 31, 1985 (age 41); United States
- Education: Virginia Union University (BA) Bowie State University (MD)
- Occupations: Writer, author
- Writing career
- Language: English
- Notable work: All Boys Aren't Blue
- Website: iamgmjohnson.com

George Matthew Johnson (born October 31, 1985), more commonly known as George M. Johnson, is an American author, journalist, and activist. A queer African American, they are best known as the author of the memoir-manifesto All Boys Aren't Blue (2020).

== Early life and education ==
Johnson spent their early childhood in New Jersey and later, Virginia. They described their family as loving and affirming of Johnson prior to them officially coming out at age 25. Johnson attended the HBCU Virginia Union University, where they became a member of Alpha Phi Alpha. Then attended graduate school at Bowie State University.

== Career ==
Johnson's writing has appeared in Teen Vogue, Entertainment Tonight, NBC, The Root, BuzzFeed, Essence, Ebony, them, and TheGrio.

They gained wider prominence for their memoir-manifesto All Boys Aren't Blue (2020). The book is a collection of coming-of-age essays describing Johnson's memories of growing up with particular focus on their Black, queer identity. The essays center pivotal experiences, including affirming relationships with family members, their understanding of masculinity, sexual encounters, and experiences of sexual abuse. The book was selected for YALSA's Teens' Top 10 and the ALA Rainbow Book List, and received a starred review from Kirkus. The Root included Johnson on their list "100 Most Influential African Americans in 2020."

As of November 2021, All Boys Aren't Blue was one of the most frequent targets of book bans and challenges amid an "unprecedented" period of book banning according to ALA. The book topped the ALA's list of the most challenged library books of 2024. It was removed from libraries in eight states due to claims of "sexual obscenity" for its descriptions of queer sex and masturbation. In response to the claims, Johnson stressed the sexual education value of the book and context for those descriptions, saying in a Time interview, "I am using my story to teach kids about the mistakes that I made the first time that I was having sex, so they don't make those same mistakes. I am teaching kids about not feeling guilty when sexual abuse happens, and how to recognize sexual abuse...And how to fight back against those traumas that you can hold on to for so very long. So they're leaving very, very important context out, intentionally of course, to try and say my book is pornographic."

In 2021, they released a second memoir, We Are Not Broken, focused on Black boyhood and their grandmother, Nanny. The book was named a secondary honoree for the Carter G. Woodson Book Award. Their book Flamboyants: The Queer Harlem Renaissance I Wish I'd Known was named a New York Public Library Best Book of the Year.

== Personal life ==
Johnson is queer and non-binary.

== Works ==
- The (________) They Don't Teach You About College (2016)
- All Boys Aren't Blue (2020)
- We Are Not Broken (2021)
- Black Boy Joy: 17 Stories Celebrating Black Boyhood (contributor) (2021)
- Flamboyants: The Queer Harlem Renaissance I Wish I'd Known (2024)
- There's Always Next Year (2025) (with Leah Johnson)
- Five Second Violation (TBD)
- Property of No State (TBD)
- Stonewall, illustrated by Theo Lorenz (TBD)

== Awards and honors ==
Year	Work	Award	Result	Ref.
2019	"When Racism Anchors your Health" in Vice	National Association of Black Journalists' Salute to Excellence Award	Winner	
2019	All Boys Aren't Blue	Outstanding Books for the College Bound: Literature and Language Arts	Selection	
2020	All Boys Aren't Blue	Goodreads Choice Award for Memoir & Autobiography	Nominee	
2021	All Boys Aren't Blue	ALA Rainbow Book List	Top 10	
2021	All Boys Aren't Blue	YALSA's Amazing Audiobooks for Young Adults	Selection	
2021	All Boys Aren't Blue	YALSA's Teens' Top 10	Selection	
