= Peter Parnell =

American playwright and writer

Peter Parnell (/pɑːrˈnɛl/; born 1953) is an American playwright, television writer, and children's book author. Parnell is also vice-president of the Dramatists Guild of America, the professional association of playwrights, composers, lyricists, and librettists.

== Personal life ==
Parnell is gay and is married to the psychiatrist Justin Richardson. They live in Manhattan with their daughter.

== Plays ==
- The Hunchback of Notre Dame - Disney Theatricals - music by Alan Menken, lyrics by Stephen Schwartz
- On a Clear Day You Can See Forever - St. James Theater, Broadway - 2011 - starring Harry Connick Jr., Jessie Mueller, and David Turner
- Trumpery - Atlantic Theatre Company - 2007 Trumpery received its European and British premiere in Oxford, UK during June 2014.
- QED - Lincoln Center Theater - starring Alan Alda - 2001
- The Cider House Rules, Part One, adapted from John Irving's novel - Atlantic Theatre Company, Mark Taper Forum, Seattle Rep
- The Cider House Rules, Part Two, Mark Taper Forum, Seattle Rep
- Flaubert's Latest - Playwrights Horizons - 1992
- Hyde in Hollywood - Playwrights Horizons - 1989
- An Imaginary Life - Playwrights Horizons - 1993
- The Rise and Rise of Daniel Rocket - starring Thomas Hulce - Playwrights Horizons - 1984
- Romance Language - Playwrights Horizons - 1985
- Scooter Thomas Makes It to the Top of the World - National Playwrights Conference at the Eugene O'Neill Theater Center, 1977; Alley Theater, Boston, 1981
- Sorrows of Stephen - The Public Theater - 1979

== Television ==
- The West Wing, Season One - Executive Story Editor - 1999–2000
- The West Wing, Season Two - Co-Producer - 2000–2001
- The Guardian, Season One - Producer - 2001–2002
- Inconceivable, Season One - Producer - 2005
- Six Degrees, Season One - Consulting Producer - 2006–2007
- BrainDead - Producer - 2017

== Children's literature ==
- And Tango Makes Three with Justin Richardson. The book tells the true story of two male penguins living in the Central Park Zoo who pair-bonded and together hatched a chick named Tango. The book has received numerous awards and was the single most challenged or banned book in the United States in the years 2006, 2007, 2008, and 2010. It remains one of the ten most banned books in several countries.
- Christian, the Hugging Lion, a children's book about the true story of Christian the lion.

== Grants and awards ==
NEA, Guggenheim, Ingram Merrill and Lecomte de Nouy foundations; the Fund for New American Plays, Kennedy Center, American Theatre Critics' Association and Ovation awards for Best Play (for The Cider House Rules). For ["And Tango Makes Three"]:

- American Library Association Notable Children's Book - 2006
- ASPCA's Henry Bergh Award - 2005
- Gustavus Myer Outstanding Book Award- 2006
- Nick Jr. Family Magazine Best Book of the Year - 2006
- Bank Street Best Book of the Year - 2006
- Cooperative Children's Book Council Choice, and CBC/NCSS Notable Social Studies Trade Book - 2006
- Lambda Literary Award finalist - 2006
- Sheffield Children's Book Award - shortlisted - 2008
