= List of most commonly challenged books in the United States =

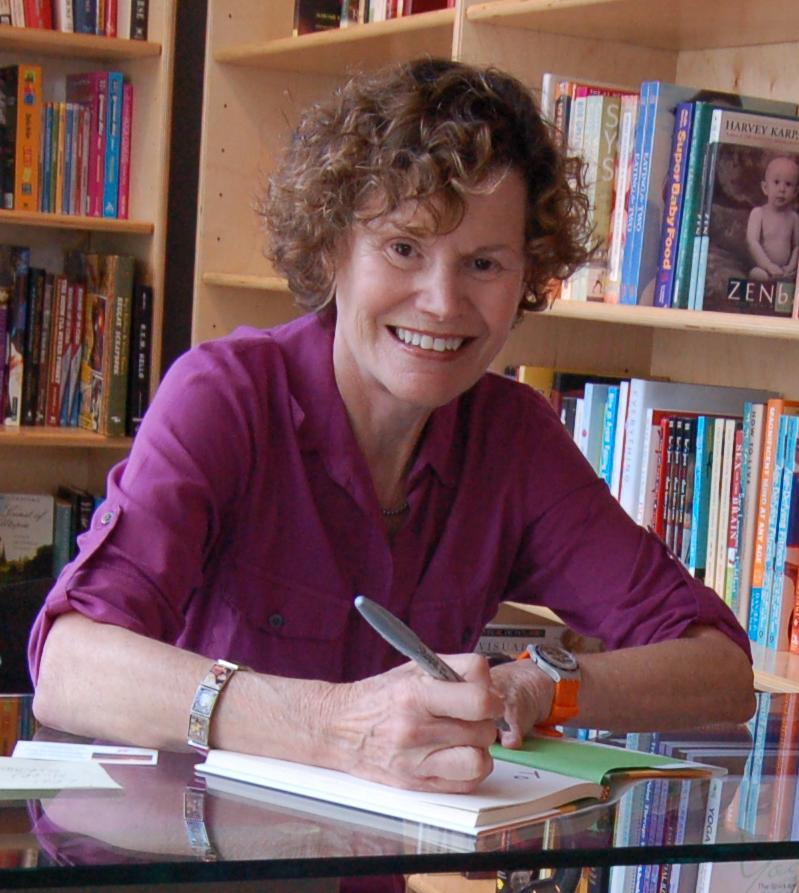
Judy Blume is the author featured most frequently on this list (five times). Her young adult novels are typically about coming of age issues such as teenage sexuality.

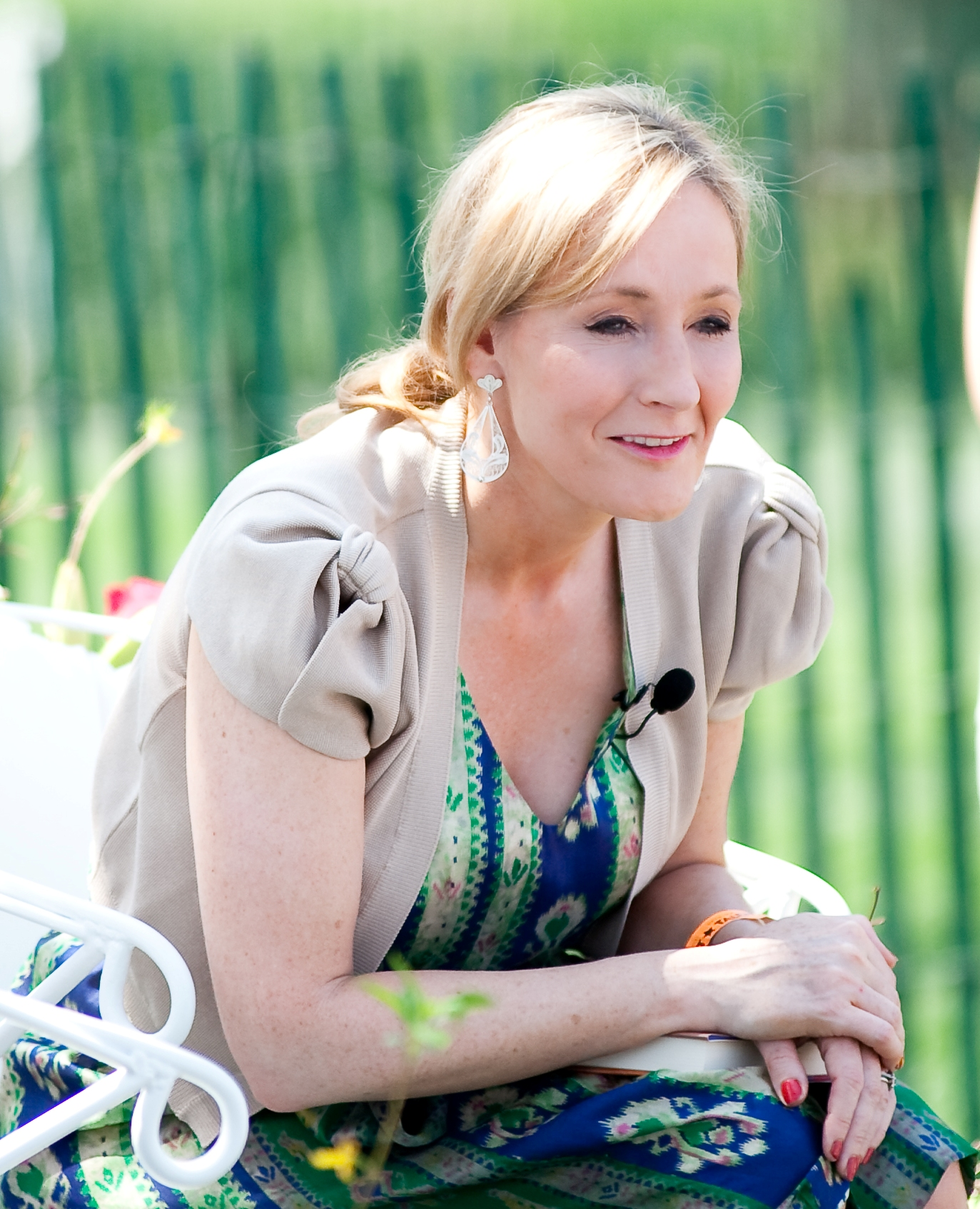
The Harry Potter series by J. K. Rowling was the most challenged work from 2000 to 2009. Its focus on witchcraft has generated controversy.

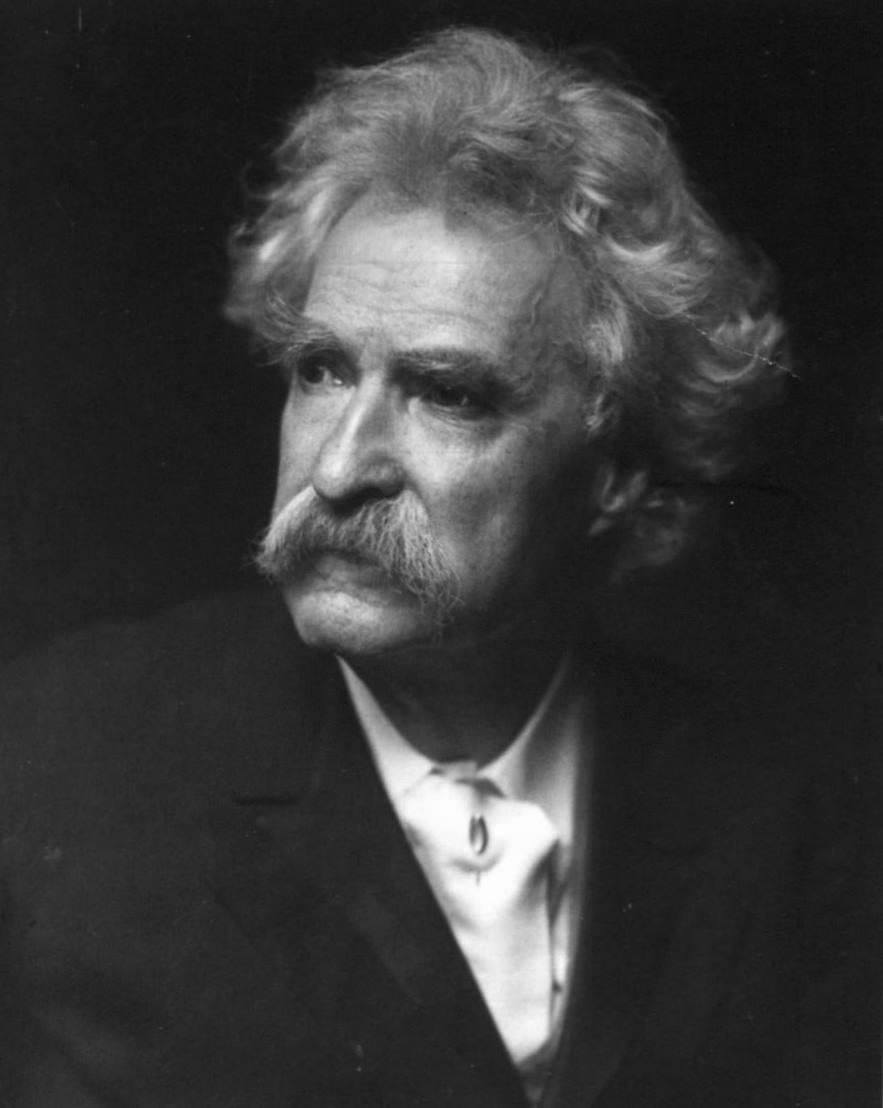
The second oldest works featured on the list were written by Mark Twain. Adventures of Huckleberry Finn (1884) is often challenged for its language and discussion of racism.

This list of the most commonly challenged books in the United States refers to books sought to be removed or otherwise restricted from public access, typically from a library or a school curriculum. This list is primarily based on U.S. data gathered by the American Library Association's Office for Intellectual Freedom (OIF), which gathers data from media reports, and from reports from librarians and teachers.

As of 2020, the top ten reasons books were challenged and banned included sexual content (92.5% percent of books on the list); offensive language (61.5%); unsuited to age group (49%); religious viewpoint (26%); LGBTQIA+ content (23.5%); violence (19%); racism (16.5%); drugs, alcohol, and smoking (12.5%); "anti-family" content (7%); and political viewpoint (6.5%).

== List ==
Since 2001, the American Library Association has posted the top ten most frequently challenged books per year on their website. Using the Radcliffe Publishing Course Top 100 Novels of the 20th Century, ALA has also noted banned and challenged classics.

The ALA does not claim comprehensiveness in recording challenges. Research suggests that for each challenge reported there are as many as four or five which go unreported.

The list is sorted alphabetically by default. Included is each book's rank in the ALA's lists of top 100 challenged books by decade (if applicable).

Title	Author	Reasons for challenge	Years published	ALA rank		
Title	Author	Reasons for challenge	Years published	2010–2019	2000–2009	1990–1999
The Absolutely True Diary of a Part-Time Indian	Sherman Alexie	Content regarding alcohol, bullying, violence; sexual references; profanity and slurs; allegations against the author	2007	1	—N/a	—N/a
Adventures of Huckleberry Finn	Mark Twain	Coarse language, racial stereotypes and use of the N-word	1884	33	14	5
The Adventures of Super Diaper Baby	Dav Pilkey	Encouraging poor spelling	2002	41	47	—N/a
The Adventures of Tom Sawyer	Mark Twain	Coarse language, racial stereotypes	1876	—N/a	—N/a	83
Alice (series)	Phyllis Reynolds Naylor	Sexual content	1985–2013	21	2	14
All American Boys	Jason Reynolds and Brendan Kiely	Profanity, drug use, and alcoholism; thought to promote anti-police views, contain divisive topics, and be “too much of a sensitive matter right now”	2015	—N/a	—N/a	—N/a
All Boys Aren't Blue	George M. Johnson	LGBT and sexual content	2020	—N/a	—N/a	—N/a
All the King's Men	Robert Penn Warren	Depicting a "depressing view of life" and "immoral situations"	1946	—N/a	—N/a	—N/a
Almost Perfect	Brian Katcher	LGBT content	2009	81	—N/a	—N/a
Always Running	Luis J. Rodriguez	Gang violence, drug use and sexual references	1993	—N/a	68	85
America	E. R. Frank	Sexual references, drug and alcohol use	2002	—N/a	100	—N/a
American Psycho	Bret Easton Ellis	Sexual references, violence toward women	1991	—N/a	—N/a	53
An American Tragedy	Theodore Dreiser	Sexual content, abortion, murder	1925	—N/a	—N/a	—N/a
The Anarchist Cookbook	William Powell	Content related to the manufacturing of illicit narcotics and explosives	1971	—N/a	—N/a	59
Anastasia Krupnik (series)	Lois Lowry	References to beer, Playboy magazine, and suicide	1979–1995	—N/a	75	28
And Tango Makes Three	Peter Parnell and Justin Richardson	Content regarding homosexuality and same-sex marriage	2005	6	4	—N/a
Animal Farm	George Orwell	Political (Communist) commentary	1945	—N/a	—N/a	—N/a
Anne Frank: Diary of a Young Girl	Anne Frank	Discussions of puberty and teenage sexuality	1946	62	—N/a	—N/a
Annie on My Mind	Nancy Garden	LGBT content	1982	—N/a	—N/a	44
Angus, Thongs and Full-Frontal Snogging	Louise Rennison	Crude language, sexual content, LGBT content	1999	—N/a	35	—N/a
Are You There God? It's Me, Margaret.	Judy Blume	Content dealing with menstrual cycles and feminine hygiene	1970	—N/a	99	60
The Arizona Kid	Ron Koertge	LGBT content	1988	—N/a	—N/a	75
Arming America	Michael A. Bellesiles	Content dealing with firearms, later proven to have been fabricated	2000	—N/a	38	—N/a
As I Lay Dying	William Faulkner	Dealing with issues of death; abortion	1930	—N/a	—N/a	—N/a
Asking About Sex and Growing Up	Joanna Cole	Sexual education	1988	—N/a	—N/a	57
Athletic Shorts	Chris Crutcher	Content dealing with eating disorders, child abuse, racism, LGBT themes and AIDS	1991	—N/a	44	63
The Awakening	Kate Chopin	Sexual content	1899	82	—N/a	—N/a
A Bad Boy Can Be Good For a Girl	Tanya Lee Stone	Crude language, sexual content, mature themes	2006	44	—N/a	—N/a
Bad Kitty (series)	Nick Bruel	Crude language	2005–2021	37	—N/a	—N/a
Beloved	Toni Morrison	Themes regarding slavery and violence	1987	45	26	45
Beyond Magenta	Susan Kuklin	Anti-family, offensive language, homosexuality, sex education, political viewpoint, religious viewpoint, unsuited for age group, and other ("wants to remove from collection to ward off complaints")	2014	27	—N/a	—N/a
Big Hard Sex Criminals	Matt Fraction, illus. by Chip Zdarsky	Sexually explicit	2015	—N/a	—N/a	—N/a
Black Boy	Richard Wright	Themes of communism, sexual content, racism and atheism	1946	—N/a	81	—N/a
Bless Me, Ultima	Rudolfo Anaya	Profanity, crude language and violence	1972	63	32	78
Blood and Chocolate	Annette Curtis Klause	Sexual content; supernatural themes	1997	—N/a	57	—N/a
Blood Meridian	Cormac McCarthy	Themes of extreme violence and child sexual abuse	1985	—N/a	—N/a	59
Blubber	Judy Blume	Content dealing with the issue of bullying	1974	—N/a	43	30
The Bluest Eye	Toni Morrison	Themes of racism, incest and child sexual abuse	1970	10	15	34
Bone (series)	Jeff Smith	References to smoking, drinking and gambling	1991–2004	16	—N/a	—N/a
The Boy Who Lost His Face	Louis Sachar	Themes of the occult, sexuality and bullying; profanity	1989	—N/a	92	46
Boys and Sex	Wardell Pomeroy	Sexual education	1968	—N/a	—N/a	61
Brave New World	Aldous Huxley	Anti-religion and anti-family themes, sexual content	1931	26	36	54
Brideshead Revisited	Evelyn Waugh	Themes of homosexuality, alcoholism, infidelity	1945	—N/a	—N/a	—N/a
Bridge to Terabithia	Katherine Paterson	Allegations that the book promotes secular humanism, New Age religion, occultism, and Satanism	1977	—N/a	28	8
Bumps in the Night	Harry Allard	Supernatural and occult themes, anti-family, encourages disobedience	1979	—N/a	93	56
Burned	Ellen Hopkins	Supernatural and occult themes, anti-family, encourages disobedience	2006	83	—N/a	—N/a
The Call of the Wild	Jack London	Author's pro-Socialism views	1903	—N/a	—N/a	—N/a
Captain Underpants (series)	Dav Pilkey	Offensive language, unsuited for age group, violence	1997–2015	2	13	—N/a
Carrie	Stephen King	Violence, anti-religious themes, sexual themes	1974	—N/a	—N/a	81
Cat's Cradle	Kurt Vonnegut	Language, animal abuse, anti-religious themes, and scatological humor	1963	—N/a	—N/a	—N/a
Catch-22	Joseph Heller	Obscene language	1961	—N/a	—N/a	—N/a
The Catcher in the Rye	J. D. Salinger	Offensive language, sexually explicit, unsuited to age group	1951	49	19	10
A Child Called "It"	Dave Pelzer	Child abuse	1995	36	—N/a	—N/a
The Chocolate War	Robert Cormier	Nudity, offensive language, sexually explicit, unsuited to age group	1974	—N/a	3	4
Christine	Stephen King	Obscene language, sexual themes	1983	—N/a	—N/a	95
A Clockwork Orange	Anthony Burgess	Obscene language	1962	80	—N/a	—N/a
The Color Purple	Alice Walker	Offensive language, sexually explicit, unsuited to age group	1982	50	17	17
The Color of the Earth (trilogy)	Tong-hwa Kim	Nudity, sex education, sexually explicit, unsuited to age group	2009	95	—N/a	—N/a
A Court of Mist and Fury	Sarah J. Maas	Sexually explicit	2016	—N/a	—N/a	—N/a
A Court of Thorns and Roses	Sarah J. Maas		2015	—N/a	—N/a	—N/a
Crank	Ellen Hopkins	Drugs, offensive language, sexually explicit	2004	38	—N/a	—N/a
Crazy	Benjamin Lebert	Obscene language, sexual themes	2000	—N/a	77	—N/a
Crazy Lady!	Jane Leslie Conly	Offensive language	1993	—N/a	45	62
Cross Your Fingers, Spit in Your Hat	Alvin Schwartz	Supernatural themes	1974	—N/a	—N/a	47
Cujo	Stephen King	Violence, obscene language, explicit sex scenes	1983	—N/a	—N/a	49
The Curious Incident of the Dog in the Night-Time	Mark Haddon	Offensive language, religious viewpoint, unsuited for age group, and other ("profanity and atheism")	2003	51	—N/a	—N/a
Curses, Hexes and Spells	Daniel Cohen	Supernatural themes, references to the Bible	1974	—N/a	—N/a	71
Cut	Patricia McCormick	References to cutting and self-harm	2000	—N/a	86	—N/a
Daddy's Roommate	Michael Willhoite	LGBT themes	1991	—N/a	—N/a	2
Daughters of Eve	Lois Duncan	Obscene language, sexual content, and violence	1979	—N/a	51	—N/a
A Day in the Life of Marlon Bundo	Jill Twiss	LGBTQIA+ content, political and religious viewpoints	2018	19	—N/a	—N/a
A Day No Pigs Would Die	Robert Newton Peck	References to animal slaughter and animal mating	1972	—N/a	80	16
The Dead Zone	Stephen King	Obscene language	1979	—N/a	—N/a	82
Deal with It!	Esther Drill	Explicit sexual content and LGBT themes	1999	—N/a	82	—N/a
Deenie	Judy Blume	References to masturbation	1973	—N/a	—N/a	42
Detour for Emmy	Marilyn Reynolds	Sexual content and references to teen pregnancy	1993	—N/a	83	—N/a
The Dirty Cowboy	Amy Timberlake		2003	60	—N/a	—N/a
Drama	Raina Telgemeier	Includes LGBT characters, was deemed sexually explicit, and was considered to have an offensive political viewpoint	2012	7	—N/a	—N/a
Draw Me a Star	Eric Carle		1992	65	—N/a	—N/a
Dreaming in Cuban	Cristina García	Sexual content and nude drawings of Adam and Eve	1992	64	61	—N/a
The Drowning of Stephan Jones	Bette Greene	LGBT themes	1991	—N/a	—N/a	96
The Earth, My Butt, and Other Big Round Things	Carolyn Mackler	Offensive language, sexually explicit, unsuited to age group	2003	—N/a	34	—N/a
Earth's Children (series)	Jean M. Auel	Graphic sexual content	1980–2011	—N/a	—N/a	19
Eleanor & Park	Rainbow Rowell	Offensive language	2013	54	—N/a	—N/a
Empire of Storms	Sarah J. Maas			—N/a	—N/a	—N/a
Ender's Game	Orson Scott Card		1985	84	—N/a	—N/a
Extremely Loud & Incredibly Close	Jonathan Safran Foer		2005	55	—N/a	—N/a
The Face on the Milk Carton	Caroline B. Cooney	Sexual content, challenging authority, and unsuitable for age group	1990	—N/a	29	80
The Facts Speak For Themselves	Brock Cole	Sexual content, violence	1997	—N/a	54	—N/a
Fade	Robert Cormier	References to child sexual abuse, and violence	1988	66	—N/a	65
Fahrenheit 451	Ray Bradbury	Obscene language, references to smoking and drinking, violence, and religious themes	1953	—N/a	69	—N/a
Fallen Angels	Walter Dean Myers	Offensive language, racism, violence	1988	85	11	36
The Family Book	Todd Parr		2003	67	—N/a	—N/a
Family Secrets	Norma Klein	Sexual content, obscene language, references to adultery, smoking, and implied incest	1985	—N/a	—N/a	76
A Farewell to Arms	Ernest Hemingway	Sexual content	1929	—N/a	—N/a	—N/a
Fat Kid Rules the World	KL Going	Obscene language, sexual themes, and drug use	2003	—N/a	58	—N/a
Feed	M. T. Anderson		2002	68	—N/a	—N/a
Fight Club	Chuck Palahniuk	Sexually explicit, violence, anarchist themes, smoking, drinking	1996	—N/a	—N/a	—N/a
Fifty Shades of Grey (series)	E. L. James	Sexually explicit, unsuited to age group, and other ("poorly written," "concerns that a group of teenagers will want to try it")	2011	8	—N/a	—N/a
The Fighting Ground	Avi	Obscene language	1984	—N/a	42	—N/a
Final Exit	Derek Humphry	References to assisted suicide	1991	—N/a	—N/a	29
Flamer	Mike Curato	LGBT and sexual content	2020	—N/a	—N/a	—N/a
Flashcards of My Life	Charise Mericle Harper	Sexual content and unsuitable to age group	2006	—N/a	—N/a	—N/a
Flowers for Algernon	Daniel Keyes	Sexual content	1966	—N/a	—N/a	43
For Whom the Bell Tolls	Ernest Hemingway	Pro-Communist views	1940	—N/a	—N/a	—N/a
Forever...	Judy Blume	Offensive language, sexual content	1975	—N/a	16	7
Friday Night Lights	H. G. Bissinger	Obscene language, sexual content, and racism	1990	—N/a	89	—N/a
Fun Home	Alison Bechdel	Violence and other ("graphic images").	2006	31	—N/a	—N/a
The Giver	Lois Lowry	Obscene language, sexual content, violence, and unsuitable to age group	1993	61	23	11
Girls and Sex	Wardell Pomeroy	Sex education	1970	—N/a	—N/a	98
Gender Queer	Maia Kobabe	Queer content, sexual content (Note: Gender Queer was the most challenged book of 2021, 2022, and 2023)	2019	—N/a	—N/a	—N/a
Glass	Ellen Hopkins	Drugs	2007	86	—N/a	—N/a
The Glass Castle	Jeannette Walls	Offensive language, sexually explicit	2005	17	—N/a	—N/a
Go Ask Alice	Anonymous	Drugs	1971	—N/a	18	25
Go Tell It on the Mountain	James Baldwin	Obscene language, explicit sex, references to masturbation, rape, violence and sexism	1953	—N/a	—N/a	—N/a
Go the Fuck to Sleep	Adam Mansbach	Offensive language	2011	69	—N/a	—N/a
The Goats	Brock Cole	Obscene language and a scene describing the rescue of a naked woman	1987	—N/a	—N/a	26
Gone with the Wind	Margaret Mitchell	Several uses of racial slurs, the book's portrayal of slavery, and references to rape	1936	—N/a	—N/a	—N/a
Goosebumps (series)	R. L. Stine	Supernatural themes, violence, and encouraging disobedience	1992–1997	46	94	15
Gossip Girl (series)	Cecily von Ziegesar	Drugs, offensive language, sexually explicit	2002–2011	56	22	—N/a
The Grapes of Wrath	John Steinbeck	Portrays Kern County, California in a negative light	1939	—N/a	—N/a	—N/a
The Great Gatsby	F. Scott Fitzgerald	Language and sexual references	1925	—N/a	—N/a	—N/a
The Great Gilly Hopkins	Katherine Paterson	Obscene language and racism	1978	—N/a	52	20
Grendel	John Gardner	Depictions of torture and mutilation	1971	—N/a	96	—N/a
Guess What?	Mem Fox	Supernatural things and references to punk rock	1990	—N/a	—N/a	66
Habibi	Craig Thompson	Nudity, sexually explicit, and unsuited for age group	2011	70	—N/a	—N/a
Halloween ABC	Eve Merriam	Possible Satanic and cult references, as well as violence	1987	—N/a	—N/a	31
The Handmaid's Tale	Margaret Atwood	Sexuality, profanity, suicide, violence, anti-Christian themes	1985	29	88	37
Harris and Me	Gary Paulsen	Obscene language	1993	—N/a	70	—N/a
Harry Potter (series)	J. K. Rowling	Unsuited to age group, witchcraft, religious viewpoint, anti-family, darkness/scariness/violence, and for "setting bad examples"	1997–2007	—N/a	1	48
The Hate U Give	Angie Thomas	Profanity, violence, "thought to promote an anti-police message and indoctrination of a social agenda"	2017	30	—N/a	—N/a
Heather Has Two Mommies	Lesléa Newman	Homosexuality	1989	87	—N/a	9
His Dark Materials (series)	Philip Pullman	Political viewpoint, religious viewpoint, violence	1995–2000	—N/a	8	—N/a
The Holy Bible	Various	Religious viewpoint, violence	Canon est. ca. 3rd century A.D.	52	—N/a	—N/a
House of Night (series)	P. C. Cast		2007–2014	57	—N/a	—N/a
The House of the Spirits	Isabel Allende	Sexual content	1982	71	97	73
The Hunger Games (series)	Suzanne Collins	Religious viewpoint, dark themes/violence, unsuited to age group	2008–2010	12	—N/a	—N/a
I Am Jazz	Jessica Herthel and Jazz Jennings	Inaccurate, homosexuality, sex education, religious viewpoint, and unsuited for age group	2014	13	—N/a	—N/a
I Know Why the Caged Bird Sings	Maya Angelou	Incest, Sexual Content	1969	88	6	3
I Saw Esau	Iona and Peter Opie	Obscene language	2000	—N/a	98	—N/a
Identical	Ellen Hopkins		2008	—N/a	—N/a	—N/a
In Cold Blood	Truman Capote	Violence, sexual content, and obscene language	1966	—N/a	—N/a	—N/a
In Our Mother's House	Patricia Polacco		2009	47	—N/a	—N/a
In the Night Kitchen	Maurice Sendak	Nudity and sexual references exploiting a toddler	1970	—N/a	24	21
Internet Girls (series)	Lauren Myracle	Offensive language, religious viewpoint, sexually explicit, unsuited to age group	2004–2007	9	9	—N/a
Invisible Man	Ralph Ellison	Obscene language and sexual content	1952	—N/a	—N/a	—N/a
It's A Book	Lane Smith		2010	32	—N/a	—N/a
It's Perfectly Normal	Robie Harris	Nudity, sex education, sexually explicit, unsuited to age group. Additional reasons: "alleges it is child pornography"	1994	22	12	13
It's So Amazing	Robie Harris	Sex education, sexual content	1999	—N/a	37	—N/a
Jack	A. M. Homes	LGBT themes and references to divorce and domestic violence	1990	—N/a	—N/a	74
Jacob's New Dress	Sarah Hoffman	LGBT content	2014	72	—N/a	—N/a
James and the Giant Peach	Roald Dahl	Supernatural themes and references to drug use	1961	—N/a	—N/a	50
The Joy of Gay Sex	Charles Silverstein and Edmund White	LGBT themes and explicit sexual content	1977	—N/a	78	—N/a
Julie of the Wolves	Jean Craighead George	Unsuited to age group, violence	1972	—N/a	91	32
Jump Ship to Freedom	James Lincoln Collier and Christopher Collier	Obscene language, violence, and racism	1981	—N/a	—N/a	100
Jumper	Steven Gould	References to physical and sexual abuse towards children	1992	—N/a	—N/a	94
The Jungle	Upton Sinclair	Author's pro-Socialism and anti-Communism views	1906	—N/a	—N/a	—N/a
Junie B. Jones (series)	Barbara Park	Encouraging disobedience	1992–2011	—N/a	71	—N/a
Kaffir Boy	Mark Mathabane	References to male prostitution and sexual abuse	1986	—N/a	39	33
Killing Mr. Griffin	Lois Duncan	Violence and obscene language	1978	—N/a	25	64
King & King	Linda De Haan and Stern Nijland	Homosexuality	2002	—N/a	20	—N/a
Kingdom of Little Wounds	Susann Cokal	Sexual content, homosexuality	2013	78	—N/a	—N/a
The Kite Runner	Khaled Hosseini	Offensive language, unsuited to age group, violence	2003	11	50	—N/a
Lady Chatterley's Lover	D. H. Lawrence	Sexual content	1928	—N/a	—N/a	—N/a
Last Night at the Telegraph Club	Malinda Lo		2021	—N/a	—N/a	—N/a
Lawn Boy	Jonathan Evison	LGBT and sexual content	2018	—N/a	—N/a	—N/a
Less than Zero	Bret Easton Ellis	Drug abuse, sexual content, language and a bisexual main character	1985	—N/a	—N/a	—N/a
Let's Talk About It	Erika Moen and Matthew Nolan	LGBT content, sex education	2021	—N/a	—N/a	—N/a
The Librarian of Basra	Jeanette Winter	Violence, unsuited to age group, promotion of Islam, "un-American" content	2005	96	—N/a	—N/a
Life is Funny	E. R. Frank	Sexual content	2000	—N/a	40	—N/a
A Light in the Attic	Shel Silverstein	Violence and encouraging disobedience	1981	—N/a	—N/a	51
Little Bill (children book series)	Bill Cosby, illus. by Varnette P. Honeywood	Criminal sexual allegations against the author	1997–2000	—N/a	—N/a	—N/a
Lolita	Vladimir Nabokov	References to pedophillia and sexual abuse	1955	73	—N/a	—N/a
Looking for Alaska	John Green	Offensive language, sexually explicit, and unsuited for age group.	2005	4	—N/a	—N/a
Lord of the Flies	William Golding	Obscene language, violence, and animal cruelty	1954	—N/a	—N/a	68
The Lord of the Rings	J. R. R. Tolkien	Supernatural themes	1954	—N/a	—N/a	—N/a
The Lovely Bones	Alice Sebold	Religious themes	2002	—N/a	74	—N/a
Lush	Natasha Friend	Drugs, offensive language, sexually explicit, unsuited to age group	2006	48	—N/a	—N/a
Madeline and the Gypsies	Ludwig Bemelmans	Slur	1958	89	—N/a	—N/a
Make Something Up	Chuck Palahniuk	Profanity, sexual explicitness, and being "disgusting and all around offensive"	2015	—N/a	—N/a	—N/a
Me and Earl and the Dying Girl	Jesse Andrews	Profanity, sexually explicit	2012	—N/a	—N/a	—N/a
Mein Kampf	Adolf Hitler	Glorification of militant nationalism, Nazism and anti-semitism	1925	—N/a	—N/a	—N/a
Melissa	Alex Gino	Includes a transgender child, and the "sexuality was not appropriate at elementary levels"	2015	5	—N/a	—N/a
Monster	Walter Dean Myers		1999	74	—N/a	—N/a
Mick Harte Was Here	Barbara Park	Obscene language and references to death	1996	—N/a	64	—N/a
Mummy Laid an Egg	Babette Cole	Sex education	1994	—N/a	—N/a	77
My Brother Sam Is Dead	James Lincoln Collier and Christopher Collier	Obscene language and violence	1974	—N/a	27	12
My Mom's Having a Baby!	Dori Hillestad Butler	Nudity, sex education, sexual content, and unsuitable for age group	2005	58	—N/a	—N/a
My Princess Boy	Cheryl Kilodavis	LGBT content	2009	90	—N/a	—N/a
My Sister's Keeper	Jodi Picoult	Homosexuality, offensive language, religious viewpoint, sexism, sexually explicit, unsuited to age group, violence	2004	—N/a	—N/a	—N/a
The Naked and the Dead	Norman Mailer	Obscene language	1948	—N/a	—N/a	—N/a
Naked Lunch	William S. Burroughs	Sexual content	1959	—N/a	—N/a	—N/a
Nasreen's Secret School	Jeanette Winter	Religious viewpoint, unsuited to age group, and violence	2009	75	—N/a	—N/a
Native Son	Richard Wright	Violence and sexual content	1940	—N/a	—N/a	69
Neonomicon	Alan Moore	Ritualistic sex, psychiatric disorders	2010	59	—N/a	—N/a
The New Joy of Gay Sex	Charles Silverstein, Edmund White, and Felice Picano	LGBT themes and sexual content	1993	—N/a	—N/a	24
Nickel and Dimed	Barbara Ehrenreich	Drugs, inaccurate, offensive language, political viewpoint, religious viewpoint	2001	39	—N/a	—N/a
Nineteen Eighty-Four	George Orwell	Pro- and anti-Communist views, sexual content, and violence	1949	79	—N/a	—N/a
Nineteen Minutes	Jodi Picoult	LGBTQ+ characters, depicts school shooting	2007	23	—N/a	—N/a
Of Mice and Men	John Steinbeck	Offensive language, racism, violence	1937	28	5	6
Olive's Ocean	Kevin Henkes	Obscene language and sexual content	2003	—N/a	59	—N/a
On My Honor	Marion Dane Bauer	References divorce, death, suicide, and defeat	1986	—N/a	—N/a	72
One Flew Over the Cuckoo's Nest	Ken Kesey	Obscene language, violence, and references to mental illness	1962	—N/a	49	—N/a
Ordinary People	Judith Guest	Obscene language and sexual content	1976	—N/a	—N/a	52
Out of Darkness	Ashley Hope Pérez	Abuse, sexual content	2015	—N/a	—N/a	—N/a
The Outsiders	S. E. Hinton	Obscene language, gang violence, underage smoking and drinking, strong language/slang, and family dysfunction, legitimisation of murder and anti-religious content	1967	—N/a	—N/a	38
The Perks of Being a Wallflower	Stephen Chbosky	Drugs/alcohol/smoking, homosexuality, offensive language, sexually explicit, unsuited for age group. Additional reasons: "date rape and masturbation"	1999	14	10	—N/a
Persepolis (series)	Marjane Satrapi	Gambling, offensive language, political viewpoint. Additional reasons: "politically, racially, and socially offensive," "graphic depictions"	2000–2003	40	—N/a	—N/a
The Pigman	Paul Zindel	Obscene language	1968	—N/a	—N/a	39
The Pillars of the Earth	Ken Follett	Sexual content and references to violence toward women	1989	—N/a	—N/a	91
A Prayer for Owen Meany	John Irving	Anti-religion and criticism of the Vietnam War and the Iran-Contra incident	1989	—N/a	76	—N/a
Prince & Knight	Daniel Haack, illus. by Stevie Lewis	LGBTQIA+ content; featuring a gay marriage; being “a deliberate attempt to indoctrinate young children” with the potential to cause confusion, curiosity, and gender dysphoria; conflicting with a religious viewpoint	2018	91	—N/a	—N/a
Private Parts	Howard Stern	Sexual content	1993	—N/a	—N/a	86
Rabbit, Run	John Updike	Sexual content	1960	—N/a	—N/a	—N/a
Rainbow Boys	Alex Sanchez	LGBT themes, sexual content	2001	—N/a	48	—N/a
Revolutionary Voices	Amy Sonnie	Homosexuality, sexually explicit	2000	92	—N/a	—N/a
Roll of Thunder, Hear My Cry	Mildred D. Taylor	Offensive language	1976	—N/a	66	—N/a
Running Loose	Chris Crutcher	Racial slurs, sexual content	1983	—N/a	—N/a	92
The Rules of Attraction	Bret Easton Ellis	Graphic sexual content, strong suicide scene, language, LGBTQ+ themes	1987	—N/a	—N/a	—N/a
Saga (series)	Brian K. Vaughan	Anti-family, nudity, offensive language, sexually explicit, and unsuited for age group	2012–present	76	—N/a	—N/a
The Satanic Verses	Salman Rushdie	Portrayal of Muhammad in a negative light	1988	—N/a	—N/a	—N/a
Scary Stories to Tell in the Dark (series)	Alvin Schwartz	Unsuited for age group, violence	1981–1991	24	7	1
A Separate Peace	John Knowles	Sexual content	1959	—N/a	—N/a	—N/a
Sex	Madonna	Sexual content	1992	—N/a	—N/a	18
Sex Education	Jenny Davis	Sexual content	1995	—N/a	—N/a	93
Sex is a Funny Word	Cory Silverberg, illus. by Fiona Smyth	LGBTQIA+ content, discussing gender identity and sex education, concerns that the title and illustrations were “inappropriate,” believed to lead children to “want to have sex or ask questions about sex”	2015	20	—N/a	—N/a
Shade's Children	Garth Nix	Sexual content and nudity	1997	—N/a	95	—N/a
Skippyjon Jones (series)	Judy Schachner	Depicting stereotypes of Mexican culture	2001–present	93	—N/a	—N/a
Slaughterhouse-Five	Kurt Vonnegut	Sexual content, anti-religious content, violence	1969	—N/a	46	67
The Sleeping Beauty Quartet (series)	Anne Rice	Sexual content	1983–2015	—N/a	—N/a	55
Snow Falling on Cedars	David Guterson	Sexual content	1994	—N/a	33	—N/a
So Far from the Bamboo Grove	Yoko Kawashima Watkins	References to rape and violence against women	1986	94	84	—N/a
Sold	Patricia McCormick	Sexual content, rape	2006	—N/a	—N/a	—N/a
Something Happened in Our Town	Marianne Celano, Marietta Collins, and Ann Hazzard, illus. by Jennifer Zivoin	"Divisive language", thought to promote anti-police views	2018	—N/a	—N/a	—N/a
Song of Solomon	Toni Morrison	Sexual content, bestiality, and racism	1977	—N/a	72	84
Sons and Lovers	D. H. Lawrence	Sexual content and incest	1913	—N/a	—N/a	—N/a
Sophie's Choice	William Styron	Sexual content	1979	—N/a	—N/a	—N/a
Speak	Laurie Halse Anderson	References to rape	1999	25	60	—N/a
Stamped: Racism, Antiracism, and You	Ibram X. Kendi and Jason Reynolds	Author's public statements, and because of claims that the book contains “selective storytelling incidents” and does not encompass racism against all people.	2020	—N/a	—N/a	—N/a
Staying Fat for Sarah Byrnes	Chris Crutcher	Obscene language, sexual content	1993	—N/a	85	—N/a
A Stolen Life: A Memoir	Jaycee Dugard	Drugs/alcohol/smoking, offensive language, sexually explicit, unsuited for age group	2011	—N/a	—N/a	—N/a
Storm and Fury	Jennifer L. Armentrout		2019	—N/a	—N/a	—N/a
The Story of Little Black Sambo	Helen Bannerman	Racism	1899	—N/a	—N/a	90
Stuck in the Middle	Ariel Schrag		2007	77	—N/a	—N/a
The Stupids (series)	Harry Allard and James Marshall	Promoting negative behavior, references to death, and obscene language	1974–1989	—N/a	62	27
Summer of My German Soldier	Bette Greene	Offensive language, racism, sexually explicit	1973	—N/a	55	88
The Sun Also Rises	Ernest Hemingway	Sexual content	1926	—N/a	—N/a	—N/a
Taming the Star Runner	S. E. Hinton	Offensive language	1988	—N/a	—N/a	—N/a
The Terrorist	Caroline B. Cooney	Portrays Muslims in a negative light	1997	—N/a	63	—N/a
That Was Then, This Is Now	S. E. Hinton	Violence, drug use, obscene language	1971	—N/a	—N/a	97
Their Eyes Were Watching God	Zora Neale Hurston	Author's political views	1937	—N/a	—N/a	—N/a
The Things They Carried	Tim O'Brien	Violence, animal abuse, obscene language, and criticism of the Vietnam War	1990	34	65	—N/a
Thirteen Reasons Why	Jay Asher	Drugs/alcohol/smoking, sexually explicit, suicide, unsuited for age group	2007	3	—N/a	—N/a
This Book Is Gay	Juno Dawson	LGBTQIA+ content, provides sexual education	2014	53	—N/a	—N/a
This Day in June	Gayle E. Pitman, illus. by Kristyna Litten	LGBT content	2013	42	—N/a	—N/a
This One Summer	Mariko Tamaki, illus. by Jillian Tamaki	Includes LGBT characters, drug use and profanity, and considered sexually explicit with mature themes	2014	43	—N/a	—N/a
Tiger Eyes	Judy Blume	Sexual content, drug use, and language	1981	—N/a	87	89
A Time to Kill	John Grisham	References to slavery, rape, and the text includes racial slurs	1989	—N/a	67	—N/a
To Kill a Mockingbird	Harper Lee	Offensive language, racism, unsuited to age group	1960	15	21	40
Tricks	Ellen Hopkins	LGBT content, drugs, rape	2009	98	—N/a	—N/a
Tropic of Cancer	Henry Miller	Sexual content	1934	—N/a	—N/a	—N/a
Twilight (series)	Stephenie Meyer	Religious viewpoint, violence, sexually explicit, unsuited to age group	2005–2008	—N/a	—N/a	—N/a
Two Boys Kissing	David Levithan	LGBT content, public displays of affection	2013	18	—N/a	—N/a
Ulysses	James Joyce	References to masturbation	1922	—N/a	—N/a	—N/a
Uncle Bobby's Wedding	Sarah S. Brannen	LGBT themes	2008	99	—N/a	—N/a
The Upstairs Room	Johanna Reiss	Obscene language and references to the Holocaust	1972	—N/a	79	—N/a
The Walking Dead (series)	Robert Kirkman	Graphic content, violence, harsh language, and sexual content.	2004–2019	97	—N/a	—N/a
We All Fall Down	Robert Cormier	Offensive language, sexual content	1991	—N/a	30	41
Whale Talk	Chris Crutcher	Racism, offensive language	2001	—N/a	41	—N/a
What My Mother Doesn't Know	Sonya Sones	Nudity, offensive language, sexually explicit, sexism, unsuited to age group	2001	35	31	—N/a
What's Happening to My Body? Book for Boys	Lynda Madaras	Sex education	1987/2007	—N/a	—N/a	58
What's Happening to My Body? Book for Girls	Lynda Madaras	Sex education	1987/2007	—N/a	73	35
When Dad Killed Mom	Julius Lester	Violence, sexual content	2001	—N/a	56	—N/a
Where Did I Come From?	Peter Mayle	Sex education	1973	—N/a	—N/a	79
Where's Waldo?	Martin Handford	Nudity	1987	—N/a	—N/a	87
The Wish Giver	Bill Brittain	Supernatural themes	1983	—N/a	—N/a	99
The Witches	Roald Dahl	Misogyny, encouraging disobedience, violence, animal cruelty, obscene language, and supernatural themes	1983	—N/a	—N/a	22
Women in Love	D. H. Lawrence	Sexual content and misogyny	1920	—N/a	—N/a	—N/a
Women on Top	Nancy Friday	Sexual content	1991	—N/a	—N/a	70
A Wrinkle in Time	Madeleine L'Engle	Supernatural themes and religious themes	1963	—N/a	90	23
Year of Wonders	Geraldine Brooks		2001	100	—N/a	—N/a
You Hear Me?	Betsy Franco	Obscene language and topics	2000	—N/a	53	—N/a

== See also ==
- Book banning in the United States (2021–present)
- List of books banned by governments
