= Miodrag Kojadinović =

Canadian–Serbian poet and academic

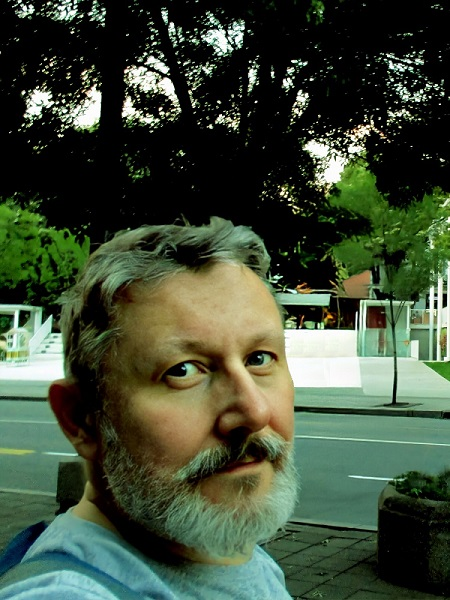
- Kojadinović in 2021, Belgrade, Serbia
- Born: 22 November 1961 (age 64); Negotin, Serbia, Yugoslavia
- Citizenship: Canadian
- Occupations: poet, translator, university lecturer
- Writing career
- Language: Dutch, English, French, Serbian
- Genres: poetry, travelogues, short stories, journalism
- Subjects: China, immigration, sex-gender, erotica, LGBT

Miodrag Kojadinović (Serbian Cyrillic: Миодраг Којадиновић, pronounced [mǐodraɡ kojadǐːnoʋit͡ɕ], born 22 November 1961) is a Canadian-Serbian linguist, interpreter, translator, writer, anthropologist, and theoretician of gender and sexuality.

== Academic involvement ==
Born in Negotin, he completed his academic education in Canada, Serbia, and Hungary, worked in three embassies (transferring to the Canadian Embassy to Belgrade when James Bissett was ambassador there), in the media in Canada and the Netherlands, carried out research at Utrecht University, the University of Amsterdam (UvA), and, under the mentorship of Eduardo P. Archetti, at Oslo University. Since 2005 he has been teaching in the People’s Republic of China, where he also uses an unofficial Chinese version of his name: 妙谠 (simplified Mandarin; in pinyin: Miào Dǎng; lit. "Merciful Counsel" or "Generous Advice"), first at Guangxi University in Nanning, Guangxi Zhuang Autonomous Region, then at a colégio in Macau, and 2012 to 2016 at Sun Yat-sen University in Guangdong Province.

== Writing ==
Miodrag Kojadinović is a polyglot and writes in English, Serbian, Dutch, and French and speaks two dozen other European and Asian languages.

He is best at short forms, focusing on short stories about localities, e.g. Macau, in a collection by global lusophone and China-based authors (published in three identical books in Chinese, Portuguese, and English) where he won the 1st prize in English, the Savamala old district of Belgrade (in Serbian), Shanghai (in English), or Pamplona (in Serbian), travelogues on Venice, Manila, Malacca, Vietnam, etc., and especially poetry (including short forms such as haiku, e.g. in Chiaroscuro for Ars Poetica). His collection of eight tales about China, Under Thunderous Skies, has Nanning, Shanghai, Macau, Hong Kong and Guangzhou as locations of the events. He has also published erotica, including Lambda Literary Award winning Érotiques Suprèmes—and academic writing.

His work has appeared in the US, Serbia (in Serbian and Hungarian), Canada, Russia, the Netherlands (in Dutch, West Frisian, and English), Slovenia, Spain, India, mainland China, Hong Kong, Macau, France, Israel, Montenegro, Scotland, England, Austria, Germany, Australia, and Croatia.

He has also edited the first GLBT studies reader in Serbian (Čitanka istopolnih studija, 2001), the first major work on queer and gender non-standard issues in Belgrade (next collection of papers with the same topic was published only in 2009, referencing Čitanka).

He was a guest on annual academic research fellowships in Oslo in 2002 and Utrecht/Amsterdam 1996/1997, on writing events and residences in Zurich for the Eurogames in 2000 (one of only three foreign artists invited, the others not writers), Macau Rota das letras literary festival in 2012, the two Balkan ones in Split in 2010 and Sofia 2017 both facilitated by the Traduki organisation for German-South East European literary cooperation, аnd in 2023 in Nanjing, a UNESCO City of Literature.

== Other media ==
His nomadic life between continents/countries is the topic of the documentary Double Exit (director Kim Meijer's graduation work for her MA course at the Utrecht School of the Arts), shown at the International Documentary Film Festival Amsterdam (IDFA) as a part of an omnibus by the students graduating in Media Production in 1996, as well as at events in Budapest and Belgrade.

His photography has also appeared in print and on the Internet.

== Selected published works ==
- Author
  - Kojadinović, Miodrag (2015). Under Thunderous Skies: Eight Tales of China Meeting Non-China. Earnshaw Books. ISBN 9789888273331.
  - Kojadinović, Miodrag (2015). Érotiques Suprèmes. Choose the Sword Press. ISBN 9780692516690.
  - Kojadinović, Miodrag (1997). Liefdespijn - Geen Medicijn: Chagrin d'amour durera toute la vie, Utrecht University
  - Kojadinović, Miodrag (1996). 'Harder! Harder! - Un Cri PriMâLE, University of Amsterdam
- Contributor
  - China beyond the binary: Race, Gender, and the Use of Story, Cambridge Scholars Publishing, UK, 2019 ISBN 9781527532212
  - Sanctuary: Short Fiction from Queer Asia anthology, Signal 8 Press, Hong Kong, 2019 ISBN 9789887794875
  - Queer Around the World Too anthology, Qommunicate Publishing, USA, 2019 ISBN 9781946952332
  - Kleinkrieg und Frieden: Eine Collage internationaler Familiengeschichten, BoD Norderstedt, Germany, 2018 ISBN 9783752840728
  - Footnote #1: A Literary Journal of History, USA, 2015 ISBN 9780692479223
  - Tincture Journal, Issue Nine, Australia, Autumn 2015 ISBN 9780987498380
  - das Letras, Rota, ed. (2013). Não há AMOR como o primeiro. PraiaGrande Edições. ISBN 9789996595028.
  - Script Road, The, ed. (2013). First Things First. PraiaGrande Edições. ISBN 9789996595011.
  - 雋文不朽, 澳門文學節, ed. (2013). 一生萬物. PraiaGrande Edições. ISBN 9789996595035.
  - Božović, Gojko, ed. (2013). Priče o Savamali. Arhipelag. ISBN 9788652300846.
  - Bobić, Mirjana, ed. (2011). Antidepresiv. Ganeša klub. ISBN 9788684371173.
  - Brown, Angela, ed. (2004). Mentsh. Alyson Publications. ISBN 9781555838508.
  - Sheppard, Simon, ed. (2000) Rough Stuff. Alyson Publications. ISBN 9781555835200
  - Land, Kevin, ed. (2000). Unlimited Desires. BiPress. ISBN 9780953881604.
  - Hardeman, Rick, ed. (1997). Leuke Jongens, 1e druk. Prometheus. ISBN 9789057133114.
- Editor
  - Birkensnake VI: Neverending Tales (co-editor with Megan Milks), Providence, USA, 2013
  - Čitanka istopolnih studija, Miodrag Kojadinović (ed), Beograd, Serbia, 2001 ISBN 9788690260515
- Translator
  - Madaras, Lynda (Linda Maderas) (2005). Pažnja, dečaci rastu!. SIL. ISBN 9788683483440.
  - Grubanov, Ivan (2005). Visitor. Muzej savremene umetnosti, Beograd. ISBN 9788671012294.]
  - Prvo je stiglo jedno pismo / First There Was a Letter Ljiljana Zivkovic (ed), Labris, Serbia 2005
  - Pessoa, Fernando (2004). Antinoj. Rende. ISBN 9788683897261.

== Sources ==
- Roberto Torres, Book Review: Assaracus, The Rainbow Hub, 2013
- Vetar po ocu, Frankfurt am Main 2012, in Serbian
- First There Was a Letter/Prvo je stiglo jedno pismo, Labris 2005, in English
- РИСК Альманах: Западная лирика (RISK Almanach: Western Lyrics) by Дмитрий Кузьмин, 2002 (ISBN 5-900506-98-3) in Russian
- Eurogames 2000, Zurich, Kulturagenda, in German
- Semi-annual Report, No. 1 by The Campaign Against Homophobia; January–June 1998, in Serbian
- "Na vodama vavilonskim" (By the Rivers of Babylon), Vreme weekly, Belgrade, 3 August 1992, in Serbian
