= Archetti =

Archetti is an Italian surname. Notable people with the surname include:

- Eduardo P. Archetti (1943–2005), Argentine anthropologist
- Giovanni Andrea Archetti (1731–1805), Italian cardinal
