= My Mom's Having a Baby =

My Mom's Having a Baby may refer to:

- My Mom's Having a Baby (ABC Afterschool Special), a 1977 episode of the American television anthology series ABC Afterschool Special
- My Mom's Having a Baby (book), a 2005 children's book written by Dori Hillestad Butler and illustrated by Carol Thompson
