= Sex Education (disambiguation) =

Sex education is the instruction of issues relating to human sexuality.

Sex Education may also refer to:

- Sex Education (journal) or Sex Education: Sexuality, Society and Learning, a peer-reviewed academic journal
- Sex Education (novel), a 1995 American children's book by Jenny Davis
- Sex Education (TV series), a 2019 British comedy-drama
- "Sex Education" (Parks and Recreation), a 2012 episode of the American comedy television series

== See also ==
- Sex Ed (disambiguation)
- The Sex Education Show, a 2008 British television programme
