= The Arizona Kid =

The Arizona Kid or Arizona Kid may refer to:

- The Arizona Kid (1930 film)
- The Arizona Kid (1939 film)
- The Arizona Kid (1971 film)
- The Arizona Kid (novel), 1988 novel
