= Susann Cokal =

American author and academic

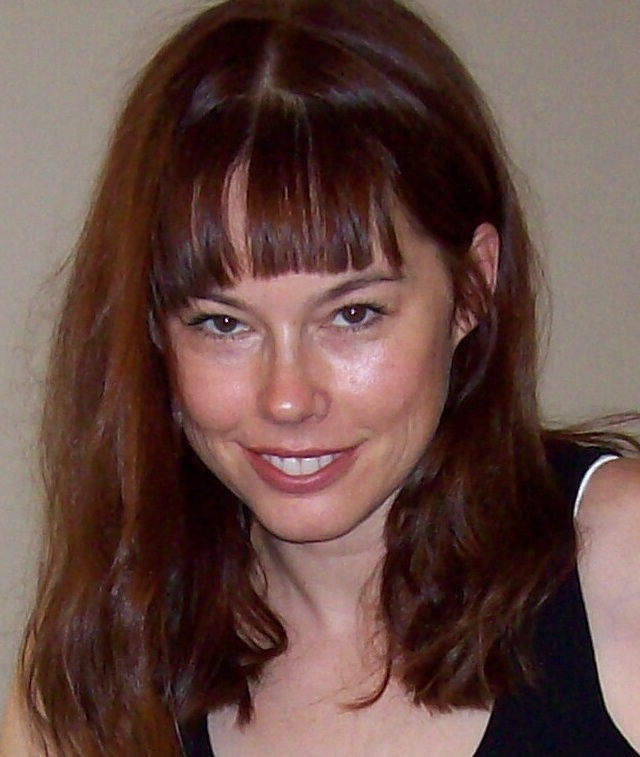
Susann Cokal (2006)

Susann Cokal is an American author. She is best known for having written the novels The Kingdom of Little Wounds, Mirabilis, Mermaid Moon, and Breath and Bones, along with short stories, literary and pop-culture criticism, and book reviews. The Kingdom of Little Wounds won a Printz silver medal from the American Library Association in 2014.

Cokal has contributed short stories to anthologies and journals including The Saturday Evening Post, Prairie Schooner, Hayden's Ferry Review, Bellevue Literary Review, The Cincinnati Review, and Ohio State University's The Journal. She also contributed essays about contemporary writers to Critique, Scandinavian Studies, Texas Studies in Literature and Language, Style, Broad Street Magazine, and The Centennial Review. She has reviewed almost four dozen books for the New York Times Book Review and has contributed reviews and essays to numerous other reviewing organs.

Cokal was formerly an assistant professor of creative writing and modern literature at California Polytechnic State University and an associate professor at Virginia Commonwealth University. She retired from academia after a traumatic brain injury (TBI). The range of her interests can be seen in her contributions to the St. James Encyclopedia of Popular Culture on abortion, supermodels, Kate Moss, and zoos. She teaches literature of the last 150 years with an international perspective, often featuring Vladimir Nabokov (whom she has called one of her literary idols), Colette, F. Scott Fitzgerald, Knut Hamsun, Marcel Proust, Patrick Süskind, Sarah Waters, Laura Ingalls Wilder, Jeanette Winterson, Virginia Woolf, and magic-realist authors such as Carlos Fuentes, Gabriel García Márquez, Louise Erdrich, Gina Nahai, and Winterson.

== Fiction ==
Some of the inspiration for Cokal's first novel, Mirabilis, "came from the year I lived in Poitiers, France. In between studying medieval art and history, I used to sneak into a decrepit medieval church whose nave was open to the sky. That church (renamed) is where Mirabilis begins. I wrote about a wet nurse because I'm fascinated with the idea that no matter how 'civilized' we've become, we still need this very primal function; also, wet nursing was the more honorable way for a woman to make a living from her body."

Cokal's first novel, Mirabilis is set in the fourteenth century in Villeneuve, France. Its protagonist is a wet nurse whose breasts provide an unending supply of milk. Reviewing the book for the Gay & Lesbian Review Worldwide, Joy Parks commented, "Mirabilis is original, humorous, and fascinatingly bizarre, an enigmatic story wrapped in a gauze of feminine sensuality." In The New York Times, Sudip Bose wrote, "Cokal's prose is vivid, and she is adept at scenes ... that recreate a distant and terrifying world."

The book's (fictional) endnotes about the settings and characters were convincing enough that many readers presumed the book was based on real incidents. They are, however, fictional.

Cokal's second novel, Breath and Bones, was released by Unbridled Books in 2005 (a paperback edition was released in 2006). It is a comic picaresque whose protagonist, an artists' model and muse named Famke (an old Swedish word meaning "girl of good family" or "girl who stays at home"), travels the western United States in the 1880s. Humor, sexuality and Cokal's vivid writing abound. Reviews, while overall positive, were more mixed than for Mirabilis; though Cokal intended the book to be a picaresque romp rooted in careful research, some critics wanted the book to be more realistic.

Wrote The New York Times: "Cokal's storytelling blends the morbid and the titillating with imaginative exuberance. ... It brings to mind the question Martin Amis asked of Lolita: how was it possible to limit her adventures to this 300-page blue streak -- to something so embarrassingly funny, so unstoppably inspired, so impossibly racy?

Cokal's third novel, The Kingdom of Little Wounds, was published in fall 2013 by Candlewick Press and (in the UK and Australia) Walker Books. In the novel, women's bodies are the battlefields for court intrigue involving marriage and medicine during the Renaissance. The novel received glowing endorsements and reviews. Gregory Maguire, author of Wicked and other novels, wrote for the book's cover, “Brazen, baroque, The Kingdom of Little Wounds plots coordinates of history, fever, and magic in such a way that each is occasionally disguised as the other. However, there's no disguising Susann Cokal's immediate rise to eminence as a pantocrator of new realms. I lived in her controversial kingdom for only a week, but I suspect and hope I shall never recover.” Kirkus Reviews noted its gritty nature and frank portrayal of attitudes toward the body, especially pertaining to women, and gave it a starred review--"mesmerizing." The book also received starred reviews from Publishers Weekly, which named it one of the best books of the year for young adults, and School Library Journal. Booklist praised "the book’s lyrical writing, enthralling characters, and compelling plot."

In January 2014 the American Library Association awarded The Kingdom of Little Wounds a Michael L. Printz Award Honor as one of the year's best works of literature for young readers. The Printz awards committee said of the book: "Impeccably researched and darkly disturbing, this complex literary tale reveals the sordid side of palace life in a 16th century Scandinavian kingdom where the royal family, the Lunedies, is cursed by a mysterious illness, and political machinations cast doubt on who will rule."

The paperback came out in spring 2016.

The American Library Association has placed "The Kingdom of Little Wounds" on its list of the most-banned books published between 2010 and 2019.

Her fourth novel, "Mermaid Moon," was published by Candlewick in 2020. In an essay for PillPack's Folks publication, Cokal described the writing of "Mermaid Moon" as helping her through the darkest days following a traumatic brain injury and complications from Sjogren's.

== Other writings ==
Though novels are her primary focus, Cokal has achieved some note as a short story writer, pop culture analyst, and literary scholar.

She is especially interested in Barbie and has written several short stories about people swept up in the culture of Mattel's best-known toy. She also wrote an essay, "Making Friends with Midge," analysing the ways in which Barbie's relationship with her ever-remodelled best friend, Midge, reflects and informs American styles of female friendship. That essay received a Pushcart Prize special mention. A story involving the TV show The Price Is Right was published in The Los Angeles Review.

After a traumatic head injury in 2012 destroyed her memory and some of her ability with language, Cokal wrote an essay on the experience for Hayden's Ferry Review. As she noted on her website in 2016, she never fully recovered from the concussion, which left her with severe chronic migraines and "a great blank in which I remember only a few bad things" for 2012.

She has published a variety of scholarly essays in academic journals and anthologies, many of which combine her interests in comparative literature, disease, pop culture, and the female body. She is fluent in French and Danish and often highlights influential world literature that has been overlooked in an English-dominated American canon. These publications include articles on tuberculosis and metaphor in nineteenth-century Scandinavian novels, French philosopher and novelist Georges Bataille; "The Ergonomics of Feminine Space in The Sopranos," which appeared in Considering David Chase; "The Visual Aesthetics of Hygiene, Hot Sex, and Hair Removal" in POP-porn; and "Caught in the Wrong Story: Psychoanalysis and Narrative Structure in Tender Is the Night," a frequently cited article about F. Scott Fitzgerald's narrative form. She has also written about classic children's authors such as Zilpha Keatley Snyder and Edward Eager for Rain Taxi.

A professor of literature and creative writing, Cokal has published tips for aspiring writers on her website, noting "Great stories give the reader an experience, a sense of events unfolding over time and coming to some kind of conclusion (or a hint that a conclusion is in the offing). In some sense, fiction is didactic, too, for in an emotionally stirring way, it shows the reader something significant about life. You may break some rules, but in general it is wise to guard a few precepts in thy memory." She says first of all to "Write something important."

== Works ==
Books

- Mermaid Moon (novel), Candlewick Press (Boston), 2020
- The Kingdom of Little Wounds (novel), Candlewick Press (Boston), 2013
- Mirabilis (novel), PenguinPutnam / Blue Hen (New York, NY), 2001
- Breath and Bones (novel), Unbridled Books (Denver, CO), 2005
