= The Family Book =

2003 children's book by Todd Parr

- First edition
- Author: Todd Parr
- Illustrator: Todd Parr
- Language: English
- Subject: Families
- Genre: Children's literature
- Publisher: Little, Brown Books for Young Readers
- Publication date: 2003
- Publication place: United States
- Media type: Print
- ISBN: 0316155632

The Family Book is a 2003 children's picture book written and illustrated by Todd Parr that details the daily lives of all kinds of families. Each unique family structure is depicted with vivid illustrations that complement the book’s themes of family diversity and inclusivity. The book has been adopted in various educational settings as a teaching tool to normalize the acceptance of various family forms. The Family Book has been challenged repeatedly and has sparked controversy in certain regions due to its inclusion of same-sex marriages as a family structure in the book.

== Content summary ==
The Family Book depicts the diversity of family structures in a format digestible to young readers. Todd Parr utilizes simple, repetitive textual phrases and vibrant illustrations throughout the text. Each page of the book begins with the phrase “Some families are…,” followed by examples of different family compositions. Occasionally, the book deviates from its pattern, beginning some pages with “All families are…,” accompanied by qualities common to all family types. The book features families of diverse sizes and ethnicities, including those with step-siblings, multi-generational households, varied taste preferences, single parents, and parents of the same gender. While families may differ in makeup and lifestyle, the book emphasizes how families are alike in important ways, specifically in their love and care for one another. The book concludes with an affirming message that every family is special in its own way.

== Reception ==
The book won a 2004 Oppenheim Toy Portfolio Gold Award, an accolade given to new products, including literature, that enhance children’s lives. Parr's representation of different family units, specifically its reference to same sex families, has been particularly commended. The Family Book was placed on the summer reading list for the District of Columbia Public School system. This book has also been integrated into various teaching curriculums, educating students of the variety of family structures to exist.

== Censorship ==
The Family Book, along with several other LGBT-themed books, was removed from the Erie, Illinois school system after some parents complained about one line in the book that states, “some families have two moms or two dads”. As of 2023, five different Florida school districts have banned The Family Book.

In 2020, the book landed the 67th spot on the American Library Association's list of the most banned and challenged books in the United States from 2010 to 2019. For the 2021-2022 school year, The Family Book ranked as the 8th most-banned picture book in the United States.

During Pink's 2023 Trustfall tour in Florida, the singer distributed 2,000 free copies of banned books in protest against the rise of US books censorship. There were four books selected for this giveaway, including Todd Parr's The Family Book, Tony Morrison's Beloved, Stacia Deutsch's Girls Who Code, and Amanda Gorman's poem The Hill We Climb. The selection of books was done in partnership with PEN America, a national free speech group.

== Other books by Todd Parr ==
The Family Book is part of a larger collection by Todd Parr that aims to expose children to complex social themes in an accessible manner. At the end of The Family Book, a list of similarly-related books written by Todd Parr are listed.

It’s Okay to Be Different - This book celebrates individuality and self-acceptance, highlighting how individual differences make people special.

The Peace Book - A book that defines peace through various simple examples, encouraging children to think about how they can contribute to a peaceful world.

We Belong Together - This story focuses on adoption and the idea that families are brought together by love, not just biology.

The Mommy Book - A colorful depiction of different types of mothers and what makes each of them unique and special.

The Daddy Book - This book celebrates the different forms of fatherhood.

The Grandma Book - A tribute to all grandmothers, illustrating the various roles and forms of love a grandma can offer.

The Grandpa Book - This book depicts the many ways grandpas can be special and influential in a child’s life.

Reading Makes You Feel Good - A celebration of reading and the various ways it enriches our lives.

The Feelings Book - This book explores the expansive range of emotions children can experience and encourages them to express their feelings openly.

The Feel Good Book - This book is a reminder of the simple joys of life that make us feel good.

The I’m Not Scared Book - This book addresses common fears among children and offers reassurance and ways to overcome them.
