= War Comes to Willy Freeman =

- Author: James Lincoln Collier; Christopher Collier
- Genre: Juvenile fiction, Historical fiction, War novel
- Set in: American Revolutionary War
- Publisher: Yearling Books
- Publication date: 1987
- Publication place: United States
- ISBN: 9780440495048

War Comes to Willy Freeman is a 1987 children's historical fiction novel by James Lincoln Collier with contributions from his brother Christopher Collier. It is the story of an African American girl during the Revolutionary War. It is critically acclaimed but has caused controversy for its use of the words "slut" and "nigger" albeit in a historical context.

== Plot ==
The book is about a 13-year-old girl whose mother is kidnapped by Redcoats and father is killed at the Battle of Groton Heights. She runs away to her Aunt Betsy. At the end 13-year-old Willy and mother are reunited.
