= Dori Hillestad Butler =

American author of children's books

- Born: August 25, 1965 (age 61); Fairmont, Minnesota, U.S.
- Education: Bemidji State University; University of Minnesota; Hamline University
- Spouse: Bob Butler
- Children: 2

Dori Hillestad Butler (born August 25, 1965 in Fairmont, Minnesota) is an American author of more than 40 children's books, as well as magazine stories, plays and educational materials. Her first book, The Great Tooth Fairy Rip-Off, was published in 1997. She is known particularly for The Truth about Truman School, a 2008 young adult title focusing on the subject of cyber bullying, and for My Mom's Having a Baby (illustrated by Carol Thompson), which in 2011 appeared on the American Library Association's list of most commonly challenged books in the United States for its portrayal of conception and childbirth. Her 2010 mystery title, Buddy Files: Case of the Last Boy, won the 2011 Edgar Award for the best juvenile mystery published in 2010. Before becoming a children's author, Butler worked for three years as a page at a library.

== Biography ==
Butler was born August 25, 1965, in Fairmont, Minnesota to John and Donna Hillestad.

She attended Bemidji State University from 1983 to 1985, University of Minnesota from 1985 to 1986, and Hamline University from 1986 to 1987.

Butler is married to Bob Butler, with whom she has two children: Ben and Artemis. They live in Kirkland, Washington.

== Censorship ==
Butler's My Mom's Having A Baby! book has frequently been the source of censorship due to inclusions of nudity and sex education, as well as being considered "sexually explicit" and "unsuited to age group."

According to the American Library Association, it was the 58th most banned and challenged book in the United States between 2010 and 2019. In 2011, it was the fourth most banned and challenged book in the country.

== Awards and honors ==
A total of fourteen of Butler's books are Junior Library Guild (JLG) books, including eight of her King & Kayla books: The Case of the Missing Dog Treats (2017), The Case of the Secret Code (2017), The Case of the Mysterious Mouse (2017), The Case of the Lost Tooth (2018), The Case of Found Fred (2019), The Case of the Unhappy Neighbor (2020), The Case of the Gold Ring (2021), and The Case of the Lost Library Book (2022). The following are also JLG books: Dear Beast (2020), Mr. Summerling's Secret Code (2021), The Pet Parade (2021), The Hidden Room (2021), Summer Island (2021), and The Final Treasure (2022).

King & Kayla and the Case of the Missing Dog Treats was named one of the best books of the year by the Chicago Public Library, as was King & Kayla and the Case of the Mysterious Mouse and King & Kayla and the Case of Found Fred.

Awards for Butler's writing
Year	Title	Award	Result	Ref.
2005	My Mom’s Having a Baby!	Booklist Editors' Choice: Books for Youth	Selection	
2011	Buddy Files: Case of the Last Boy	Edgar Allan Poe Award for Best Juvenile	Winner	
2017	King & Kayla and the Case of the Secret Code	Cybils Award for Easy Readers	Winner	
2018	King & Kayla and the Case of the Missing Dog Treats	ALSC Notable Children's Books	Selection	
2018	King & Kayla and the Case of the Missing Dog Treats	Theodor S. Geisel Award	Honor	
2019	King & Kayla and the Case of the Lost Tooth	ALSC Notable Children's Books	Selection	
2019	King & Kayla and the Case of the Lost Tooth	Theodor S. Geisel Award	Honor	
2020	King & Kayla and the Case of the Unhappy Neighbor	Cybils Award for Easy Readers	Finalist	

== Publications ==
=== Standalone books ===
- The Great Tooth Fairy Rip-Off, illustrated by Jack Lindstrom (1996)
- M Is For Minnesota (1998)
- ABC's of Wisconsin (2000)
- H is for Hoosier (2001)
- Sliding Into Home (2003)
- Whodunit? How the Police Solve Crimes (2003)
- Alexandra Hopewell, Labor Coach (2005)
- Do You Know the Monkey Man? (2005)
- My Mom's Having a Baby!: A Kid's Month-By-Month Guide to Pregnancy (2005)
- Trading Places with Tank Talbott (2005)
- W Is For Wisconsin (2005)
- Tank Talbott's Guide to Girls (2006)
- Zack's Potty (2006)
- F Is for Firefighting (2007)
- My Grandpa Had a Stroke, illustrated by Nicole Wong (2007)
- The Truth about Truman School (2008)
- P Is for Police, illustrated by Joan Waites (2009)
- Yes, I Know the Monkey Man (2009)

=== Buddy Files series ===
The Buddy Files are illustrated by Jeremy Tugeau and published by Albert Whitman Company.

1. The Case of the Lost Boy (2010)
2. The Case of the Mixed-Up Mutts (2010)
3. The Case of the Missing Family (2010)
4. The Case of the Fire Alarm (2011)
5. The Case of the Library Monster (2011)
6. The Case of the School Ghost (2012)

=== Dear Beast series ===
The Dear Beast series is illustrated by Kevan Atteberr and published by Holiday House.

1. Dear Beast (2020)
2. The Pet Parade (2021)
3. Someone Is Missing! (2022)
4. Simon Sleeps Over (2022)

=== The Haunted Library series ===
The Haunted Library series is illustrated by Aurore Damant and published by Grosset & Dunlap.

1. The Haunted Library (2014)
2. The Ghost in the Attic (2014)
3. The Ghost Backstage (2014)
4. The Five O'Clock Ghost (2015)
5. The Secret Room (2015)
6. The Ghost at the Fire Station (2015)
7. The Ghost in the Tree House (2016)
8. The Hide-and-Seek Ghost (2016)
9. The Ghosts at the Movie Theater (2017)
10. The Underground Ghosts: A Super Special (2017)

=== King & Kayla series ===
The King & Kayla books are illustrated by Nancy Meyers and published by Peachtree Publishers.

1. King & Kayla and the Case of the Missing Dog Treats (2017)
2. King & Kayla and the Case of the Secret Code (2017)
3. King & Kayla and the Case of the Mysterious Mouse (2017)
4. King & Kayla and the Case of the Lost Tooth (2018)
5. King & Kayla and the Case of Found Fred (2019)
6. King & Kayla and the Case of the Unhappy Neighbor (2020)
7. King & Kayla and the Case of the Gold Ring (2021)
8. King & Kayla and the Case of the Lost Library Book (2022)
9. King & Kayla and the Case of the Cat Hunt (2023)

=== The Treasure Troop series ===
The Treasure Troop series is illustrated by Tim Budgen and published by Penguin Workshop.

1. Mr. Summerling's Secret Code (2021)
2. The Hidden Room (2021)
3. Summer Island (2021)
4. The Final Treasure (2021)
