= Lush (novel) =

2006 novel by Natasha Friend

- Author: Natasha Friend
- Cover artist: Unknown
- Language: English
- Genre: Realistic fiction
- Publication date: October 1, 2006
- Publication place: United States
- Media type: Hardcover, paperback
- Pages: 178 pages
- ISBN: 978-0-439-85347-7

Lush is a young adult fiction novel by Natasha Friend published in 2006 by Milkweed Editions. It focuses on Samantha Gwynn, a thirteen-year-old girl whose father is an alcoholic, which "lush" is another name for. It was listed on the Young Adult Library Services Association's (YALSA) 2007 Quick Picks for Reluctant Young Adult Readers released by the American Library Association (ALA). It was also named a 2008 Rhode Island Teen Book Award nominee.

Lush was included in the ALA's Top Ten List of the Most Frequently Challenged Books of 2010 list.

In the story, Sam has to confront the problem of alcoholism in her family.

== Reviews ==
School Library Journal wrote that Friend "candy

hty topic with touches of humor and grace." Booklist's review stated that "Friend adeptly takes a teen problem and turns it into a believable, sensitive, character-driven story, with realistic dialogue."

== Characters ==
- Samantha "Sam" Gywnn - Samantha, the protagonist in the story, is described with dirty Blonde hair, Green eyes and freckles. She has quite big breasts which are usually the subject of talk with her Nana and the boys at school.
- Mr. Gwynn - Mr. Gwynn is Samantha's almost always drunk father, in other words, alcoholic. He is an architect and has to apologize to his daughter many times.
- Mrs. Gwynn - Mrs. Gwynn is what her daughter calls her, a "Yoga Freak". After her trip to California, she found Yoga and brought it with her. She makes her family repeat different Yoga techniques at breakfast and takes them to the Yogi Palace, often going herself.
- Luke Gywnn - Luke is Samantha's cute four-year-old brother. He likes to "wiggle" on the couch and usually calls his sister Sammy.
- Vanessa Larton - Vanessa is Samantha's cheery and understanding friend. When her other friends are mad at Sam, she is usually easy going. Her three friends always gather at her house on Saturdays for sleepovers.
- Angie Martillenis - Angie is another friend of Samantha. She has an older sister, Marybeth who often gets into trouble for drinking and partying with boys and lectures the four friends on girl stuff. Angie also likes to bring up odd and disgusting topics. Her crush used to be on Danny Harmon, but she decides not to pay attention to him after she finds him making out with Molly Katz in the school hallway.
- Tracey - Tracey is Samantha's third friend. She is easy to gross out, usually Angie's job.
- Charlie Parker - Charlie was friends with Samantha throughout elementary school. They broke up when Samantha blamed him for stealing her bra, a crime he didn't commit. In the ending of the novel, Samantha apologizes and they make up again.
- Drew Maddox - Drew is in high school and shows potential interest on Samantha's chest. He sits at the "Jock" table in the library, otherwise going to parties with girls. Drew is surprised when he learns Samantha is only thirteen and isn't seen in the library since then.
- Nana - Nana, is Mr. Gwynn's mother and Samantha's grandmother. She likes to bake and comes over when her son is missing or is in bad shape. Nana usually comments her granddaughter on her breasts.
- Molly Katz - Molly is the most popular girl in the eighth grade. She likes to find ways to humiliate and tease students whenever possible. One of her targets is Samantha. Molly's reputation is ruined when she farts on a movie date, earning the nickname "Molly La Pew" and a toilet-papered locker.
- Ms. Fish - Ms. Fish is Samantha's grumpy gym teacher. She always calls Samantha "Frances", no matter how many times Samantha corrects her. Her name is laughed upon since, to Samantha, her face features look similar to a fish's.
- A.J.K - A.J.K is who Samantha always writes to for advice. The notes go in a book at the library but that book hasn't been checked out in 13 years. The two of them pass notes in between some of the pages so no one can crack their code and find stuff suspicious. A.J.K also brought Samantha to see her dad which was in rehab at the time.

== See also ==
- List of most commonly challenged books in the U.S.
