= The Arizona Kid (novel) =

1988 novel by Ron Koertge

- First edition
- Author: Ron Koertge
- Language: English
- Genre: Young adult
- Publisher: Joy Street Books, Little, Brown & Co.
- Publication date: 1988
- Publication place: United States
- Media type: Print
- Pages: 228 pages
- ISBN: 9780316501019 (first edition)
- OCLC: 17327918

The Arizona Kid is a 1988 novel by Ron Koertge about a summer 16-year-old Billy spends living with his gay uncle and working with racehorses. It is a coming of age story, exploring concepts of masculinity and what it means to be a "man".

== Characters ==
- Billy Kennedy: a 16-year-old from Missouri
- Uncle Wes: Billy's uncle and mentor
- Jack: a horse trainer who expresses himself through the toupee he chooses to wear
- Lew: a co-worker and friend of Billy's
- Cara Mae: an outspoken racehorse rider who develops a relationship with Billy

== Reception ==
=== Reviews ===
The American Library Association designated the book a "Best of the Best Books for Young Adults" in 1988. The School Library Journal praised it, saying "Koertge's marvelous wit (also evident in Where the Kissing Never Stops Little, 1987) out of the mouth of his young hero is a delight, and his compassion for and understanding of Wes and Billy and his summer friends shapes a funny but affecting novel." The book also received positive reviews from Publishers Weekly and the Emergency Librarian.

=== Criticism ===
The book is number seventy-five on the American Library Association's list of the top 100 most frequently challenged books from 1990 to 1999.

== See also ==
- List of most commonly challenged books in the U.S.
