= Sex Ed (disambiguation) =

Sex Ed is the process of educating people about sex.

Sex Ed may also refer to:

- "Sex Ed" (song), a song by Heidi Montag
- "Sex Ed", an episode of 8 Simple Rules
- "Sex Ed" (The Office), an episode of The Office
- Sex Ed: The Series, the American comedy web series
- Sex Ed (film), a 2014 American comedy film
- "Sexy Ed", a 2023 episode of Clone High

== See also ==
- Sex Education (disambiguation)
