= The Truth About Truman School =

Book by Dori Hillestad Butler

- Author: Dori Hillestad Butler
- Language: English
- Subject: Cyberbullying
- Published: 2008, Albert Einstein t wnistian
- Publication place: United States
- Media type: Print, ebook
- Pages: 176 pages
- ISBN: 0807580953

The Truth About Truman School is a children's book by Dori Hillestad Butler that was first published on March 1, 2008, through Albert Whitman & Company. The book deals with the subject of cyberbullying and has been listed several times as a recommended read for middle school aged students.

The Truth About Truman School has been listed on the ALA's Joint Presidents' Program Resources list for 2012.

== Synopsis ==
The book is told through the viewpoints of several different students at Truman Middle School such as Zebby and Amr, two students that have grown frustrated with the censorship of their school paper. They decide that the solution is to create their own website, thetruthabouttruman.com, where they and others can report on what they consider to be the "real" Truman Middle School. It's intended as a place where people can speak freely, but eventually some begin to use it as a way to post cruel things about one student, namely Lilly Clarke, a popular student at Truman. Someone anonymously posts pictures of her from years ago, when she was overweight and less attractive than she is now. Amr questions whether or not it is right to leave such a picture up, but Zebby insists that the website's purpose is to allow anyone to post and comment. This decision is slightly influenced by Zebby's dislike of Lilly. The posts about Lilly are met with mixed emotions, particularly from one student by the name of Trevor. He's unpopular and dislikes Lilly's current personality, but remembers times when Lilly had defended him when both were in elementary school.

Zebby begins to realize that she is becoming more popular from the website she and Amr began, and as such begins to turn a blind eye towards the activity on the website. Lilly's cyberbullying continues and escalates when someone by the online name of "milkandhoney" posts their own website falsely accusing Lilly of being a lesbian. Tensions at the school escalate, prompting Trevor to react when Lilly's boyfriend Reece tries to cheat off him during an exam. As a result, Reece begins to poke Trevor with his pencil and the actions are noticed by the teacher. The two are brought into the Principal's office, only for Trevor to get upset when she asks him what he did to provoke Reece's actions. This infuriates Trevor, who silently thinks to himself that everyone asks him what he did to deserve bullying while nobody has been asking Lilly what she did to deserve what is happening to her. Eventually Lilly becomes ostracized from the entire school, her boyfriend breaks up with her, and she constantly receives disparaging emails and messages. This comes to a head when some of her former friends send her an anonymous e-mail telling her that nobody wants her on the cheerleading team due to the accusations of being a lesbian.

The continuing cyberbullying prompts Lilly to run away from home and hide in a treehouse that she used to play in with Zebby and Amr. The two find her and convince her to return home. They realize at this point that they must bring in the authorities to discover who is posting and to stop them. It's eventually revealed that Trevor is the anonymous "milkandhoney" and that he started his actions due to Lilly and her friends bullying him in the past.

== Themes ==
The book deals heavily with the subject of cyberbullying and its effects on middle age students, as well as into the mindset of those participating. Other themes in the book are freedom of speech, social dynamics, and peer pressure.

== Reception ==
Reception for the book has been mostly positive and the text has been used in several classrooms as an example of cyberbullying and its effect on people. The School Library Journal gave a positive review for The Truth About Truman School, saying it was "sure to initiate discussion". The review from Booklist was overall positive but noted that "characters are often painted with broad, flat strokes, particularly the popular girls, resulting in a book that reads like an after-school special".
