= WestView News =

- The Voice of the West Village
- Publisher: WestView, Inc.
- Editor-in-chief: George Capsis
- Photo editor: Darielle Smolian
- Founded: 2003
- Language: English
- Headquarters: 69 Charles Street; New York, NY 10014
- Website: WestView News

The WestView News is a newspaper based in the West Village of Manhattan, New York, New York.

== History ==
The WestView News was founded in 2003. Its CEO is George Capsis.

In July 2014, the WestView News stirred controversy when it published an article by James Lincoln Collier titled "Nigger in the White House". The article is critical of perceived racism in the far-right's opposition to then-President Barack Obama. After backlash, the newspaper issued a public apology.
