= Perfect (Friend novel) =

2004 novel by Natasha Friend

- Author: Natasha Friend
- Language: English
- Genre: Realistic fiction
- Publisher: Milkweed Editions
- Publication date: September 16, 2004
- Publication place: United States
- Media type: Hardcover, Paperback
- Pages: 232 pages
- ISBN: 978-1-57131-651-6

Perfect is a children's novel by American author Natasha Friend, first published in 2004 by Milkweed Editions. Perfect won the Milkweed Prize for Children's Literature in 2004. This book is about a young girl's struggle with bulimia nervosa.

== Plot summary ==
Isabelle Lee is a 13-year-old girl with an eating disorder. The disorder developed over time after the death of her father when her mother begins to send her to group therapy. She soon realizes that the most popular girl in school, Ashley Barnum, goes to the group and begins to be friends with her.

== Awards and achievements ==
- Isinglass Teen Read Book Award, 2008
- Golden Sower Award, 2007
- Black-Eyed Susan Award nominee, 2007–2008
- Book Sense Pick, 2005
- Milkweed Prize for Children's Literature, 2004
