= Family Secrets (novel) =

1985 novel by Norma Klein

- Author: Norma Klein
- Language: English
- Genre: Young adult novel
- Publisher: Dutton Books
- Publication date: 1985
- Publication place: United States
- Media type: Print Hardback
- Pages: 262
- ISBN: 0-8037-0221-3
- OCLC: 11970916
- LC Class: PZ7.K678345 Fam 1985

Family Secrets (1985) is a young adult novel written by Norma Klein.

== Plot ==
Leslie and Peter are childhood friends who become lovers the summer before their senior year in high school. Their romance is immediately complicated by Leslie’s discovery—by reading her mother’s diary—that her mother Aline, and his father Nelson are having an affair. Before the summer is over their parents have announced their impending divorces and Leslie and Peter’s lives are thrown in disarray.

The pair spends the next few months of their lives dealing with senior year in high school, their parents' divorces, and the quick marriage that legally makes them stepsiblings. In addition, Peter is striving for early acceptance at Harvard while Leslie spends much of her time in rehearsal for her high school play for she plans to go to college for acting and drama.

When the new school year starts, Peter continues to live with his mother while Nelson moves into a new apartment with his new wife and stepdaughter. Leslie is upset at the new living arrangements because she's close to her dad and angry with her mother for the divorce and quick remarriage. Struggling to deal with the divorce, Peter’s mother decides to sell the family home and move to Chicago to finish her college degree. This forces Peter to move in with his father, stepmother, and stepsister/girl- friend. The awkwardness of the situation causes the pair to argue and abruptly end the physical relationship they had kept secret from their parents.

As they move on with their lives, Peter and Leslie reconcile and renew their intimacy as the new marriage begins to fall apart primarily because of Nelson’s womanizing, although Aline’s emotional neediness is also a contributing factor.

The novel ends with the couple planning a summer cross-country car trip before they depart for separate colleges. No longer related, they are more comfortable with resuming their relationship without the complications imposed by their parents' actions.

== Commentary ==
This novel has been challenged in many schools and public libraries for themes deemed inappropriate for adolescents; in this case, talk about divorce, sexuality and recreational drug use. Family Secrets is on the American Library Association list of the 100 Most Frequently Challenged Books of 1990-1999 at number 76.

This novel is on the ALA list for many and different reasons. Peter and Leslie have casual sexual relationship that first begins when one or both are under the effects marijuana. Only once is birth control mentioned, and then only in passing as Leslie almost forgets to pack her birth-control pills for a trip. Sexually transmitted diseases are never mentioned. Both drink alcohol to excess several times and smoke marijuana. Peter must also deal with his stress-driven overeating. Leslie attends an all-girls' school and admires a teacher who actively promotes feminist ideals.

The characters' behavior can be considered typical of most 17-year-olds with permissive parents largely concerned with their own lives. Although somewhat dated by current (2010) standards, the characters and situations are sharply drawn and the action moves quickly for those who are at a changing point in their lives.
