= Todd Parr =

American writer (born 1962)

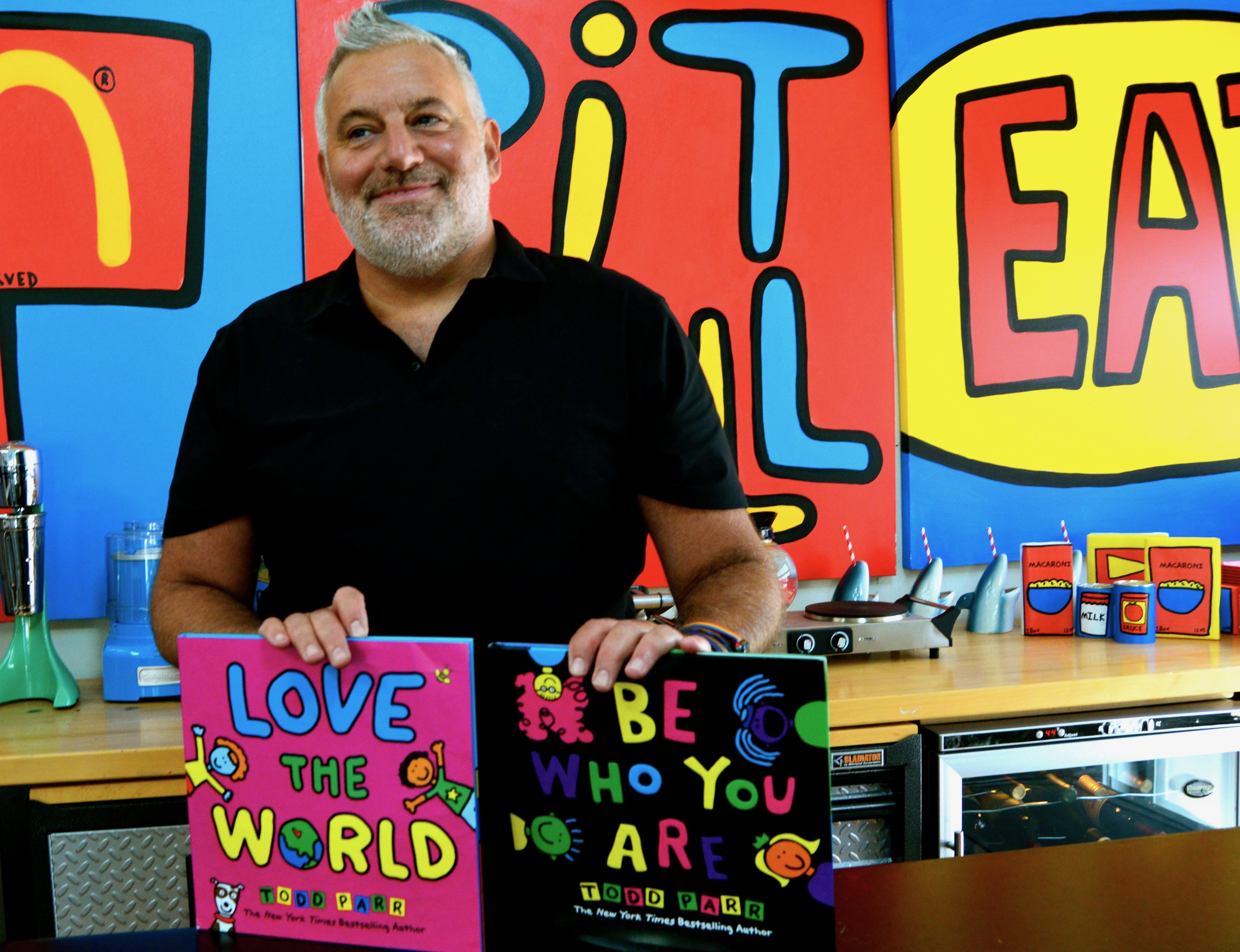
- Born: July 9, 1962 (age 64); Rock Springs, Wyoming, U.S.
- Occupations: Author, illustrator, animator, television producer
- Writing career
- Genre: Children's fiction
- Subjects: Family, tolerance, diversity
- Notable work: The Family Book
- Website: toddparr.com

Todd Parr (born 9 July 1962) is an American author, illustrator, animator and television producer, best known for his colorful, accessible children's books that often carry messages of kindness, inclusivity, and acceptance. Parr grew up in Rock Springs, Wyoming and later moved to San Francisco in 1995, where he pursued a career as an artist. He has also worked as a flight attendant before becoming a full-time author.

In November 2004, the television show he created, ToddWorld, premiered on TLC and Discovery Kids. The show, praised for its celebration of diversity and positive values, went on to receive a Daytime Emmy nomination for Outstanding Children's Animated Program.

== Books ==
- Black & White: Board Book (2001)
- BIG & Little: Board Book (2001)
- My Really Cool Baby Book (2002)
- Going Places (2002)
- The Family Book (2003)
- This is My Hair (2004)
- Reading Makes You Feel Good (2005)
- Underwear Do's and Don'ts (2005)
- Funny Faces (2009)
- It's Okay to Be Different (2001)
- The Feel Good Book (2009)
- We Belong Together: A Book about Adoption and Families (2010)
- The Earth Book (2010)
- The Peace Book (2010)
- The I LOVE YOU Book (2010)
- Things that Make You Feel Good/Things That Make You Feel Bad (2011)
- The Okay Book (2011)
- The Daddy Book (2011)
- The Grandma Book (2011)
- The Mommy Book (2011)
- The Grandpa Book (2011)
- Do's and Don'ts (2011)
- The I'M NOT SCARED Book (2011)
- The Feelings Book (2012)
- Zoo Do's and Dont's (2012)
- The Underwear Book (2012)
- The Thankful Book (2012)
- I Love Camp
- The Elephant Book
- We're Pregnant
- We're Parents
- Animals In Underwear ABC
- Doggy Kisses 123
- It's Ok To Make Mistakes (2014)
- The Goodbye Book (2015)
- Teachers Rock! (2016)
- Be Who You Are (2016)
- Love The World! (2017)
- The Brother Book (2018)
- The Sister Book (2018)
- The Cars and Trucks Book (2018)
- The Don't Worry Book (2019)
- The School Book (2019)

=== Otto books ===
- Otto Goes to the Beach (2003)
- Otto Goes to Bed (2003)
- Otto Has a Birthday Party (2004)
- Otto Goes to Camp (2004)
- Otto Goes to School (2005)

=== ToddWorld ===
- Who's Your Best Friend? (2005)
- Welcome to ToddWorld (2005)
- The Funny Book of Feelings (2005)
- Lights Out, Todd! (2005)
- Let's Play Together! (2005)
- The Silly Book of Shapes (2006)
- It's a Colorful World! (2006)
- Giant Book of Friendship Fun! (2006)
- I Like Being Me! (2006)
- I Love You Just Because (2006)

== Awards ==
=== Books ===
- 2001 National Parenting Publications Award for It's OK to Be Different
- 2001 Oppenheim Toy Portfolio Gold Award for The Feelings Book
- 2002 Oppenheim Toy Portfolio Gold Awards for The Daddy Book, The Mommy Book, Going Places
- 2004 National Parenting Publications Honor Award for Otto Has a Birthday Party
- 2004 Oppenheim Toy Portfolio Gold Award for The Family Book
- 2009 National Parenting Publications Award for The I LOVE YOU Book
- 2010 Parents' Choice Award for The Earth Book
- 2011 Green Earth Book Award for The Earth Book
- 2012 Family Equality Council Award

=== Television ===
- iParenting Media Award for ToddWorld
- 2005 Daytime Emmy Award nomination for ToddWorld
- 2005 Humanitas Prize nomination for the ToddWorld episode "Who's Your Best Friend?"
