= Christopher Collier (historian) =

American historian and fiction writer (1930–2020)

Christopher Collier (January 29, 1930 – March 6, 2020) was an American historian and fiction writer.

Collier was born in New York City. Christopher Collier, known as Kit, is the son of Edmund Collier, a writer, and Katherine Brown. He comes from a family of writers and teachers. He attended Clark University and Columbia University, (Ph.D. 1964). He was the official Connecticut State Historian (1984–2004) and professor of history emeritus at the University of Connecticut.

Collier and his brother, author James Lincoln Collier, co-wrote multiple novels, most of which are based on historic events, including two books set during the American Revolution: My Brother Sam Is Dead and War Comes to Willy Freeman; the former earned a Newbery Honor. His books for adults include Roger Sherman's Connecticut: Yankee Politics and the American Revolution; Decision in Philadelphia (with James); and All Politics is Local, about Connecticut's role in the 1787 Constitutional Convention.
