= Norma Klein =

American novelist

- Born: May 13, 1938; New York City, United States
- Died: April 25, 1989 (aged 50); New York City, United States
- Occupation: Novelist
- Writing career
- Period: 1973–1989
- Genre: Young adult fiction

Norma Klein (May 13, 1938 – April 25, 1989) was an American young adults' book author. She was born, grew up and lived in New York City for most of her life, and studied Russian at Barnard College. She died, after a brief illness, in New York City on April 25, 1989, at the age of 50. She had a husband, Erwin Fleissner, and two daughters.

Klein was best known for her adult novel Sunshine, about a young woman with terminal cancer, which was based upon a true story, and taken from the young woman's tape-recorded diary. She was also well known for her children's novel Mom, the Wolfman and Me about a girl with an unmarried mother. Ms. Klein's work dealt openly with controversial subjects, including racism, homosexuality, adoption, and death.

She wrote many novels for children and young adults including Family Secrets, which has been challenged for inclusion in school libraries, and is ranked at #76 on the American Library Association’s list of most challenged books for 1990–1999.

== Bibliography ==
=== Picture books ===
- Girls Can Be Anything (1973)
- A Train for Jane (1974)
- If I Had My Way (1974)
- Dinosaur's Housewarming Party (1974)
- Naomi in the Middle (1974)
- Blue Trees, Red Sky (1975)
- A Surprise Party for Dinosaur (1977)
- Visiting Pamela (1990)

=== Books for middle readers ===
- Mom, the Wolf Man and Me (1972)
- It's Not What You Expect (1973)
- Confessions of an Only Child (1974)
- Taking Sides (1974)
- What It's All About (1975)
- Tomboy (1978)
- A Honey of a Chimp (1980)
- Robbie and the Leap Year Blues (1981)
- Bizou (1983)
- The Cheerleader (1985)
- Snapshots (1986)
- Now That I Know (1988)

=== Books for teen readers ===
- Hiding (1976)
- It's Okay If You Don't Love Me (1977)

Jody Epstein, a New York native and senior in high school, begins dating Lyle, a Midwesterner with a more conservative background. During their relationship, she has a liaison with an ex-boyfriend, and she begins to understand the complex interrelationship between love and sex.

- Love is One of the Choices (1978).

Two high school seniors from single-parent households, Caroline and Maggie, explore sexuality and the changing role of women in the world. Caroline has a sexual relationship with her chemistry teacher.

- Breaking Up (1980)

Alison Rose, 15, and her older brother Martin visit her father and stepmother in Northern California for the summer after spending the school year in New York with her mother, Cynthia. During her summer in California, she becomes embroiled in tensions between her divorced parents as her father attempts to gain custody when Cynthia is found to be lesbian. Alison also falls in love with her best friend Gretchen's brother, Ethan, causing an estrangement with Gretchen.

- French Postcards (1980)
- Domestic Arrangements (1982)

14-year-old Tatiana "Rusty" Engelberg, daughter of a soap opera actress and a television director, seems headed for stardom after a family friend casts her as the lead in a hit movie, which includes a "tasteful" nude scene. Rusty is less concerned with her sudden rise to fame than with her first sexual relationship and her parents' love lives.

- Queen of the What Ifs (1982)
- Beginner's Love (1983)
- The Swap (1983)
- Angel Face (1984)
- Family Secrets (1985)
- Give and Take (1985)
- Going Backwards (1986)
- My Life As a Body (1987)
- Older Men (1988)
- That's My Baby (1988)
- No More Saturday Nights (1988)

Tim Weber, a high school senior who has gotten his girlfriend Cheryl pregnant, decides to keep the baby himself instead of putting him up for adoption. He takes his son, Mason, to school with him at Columbia University and faces the challenges of being pre-med and a teenaged father.

- Learning How to Fall (1989)
- Just Friends (1990)

=== Books for adults ===
- Give Me One Good Reason (1973)
- Love and other Euphemisms (1975)

A collection of early short stories and a short novel

- Sunshine (1975)

One of Norma Klein's most popular novels. Based on the true story of a young mother with terminal cancer.

- Girls Turn Wives (1976)
- Coming to Life (1977)
- Sunshine Christmas (1978)
- Sunshine Years (1981)
- Wives and Other Women (1982)
- Sextet in a Minor (1983)

A collection of short stories

- Lovers (1984)
- Baryshnikov's Nutcracker (1986)
- American Dreams (1987)
- The World As It Is (1989)
