= It's Okay to Be Different =

2001 children's book by Todd Parr

It's Okay to Be Different is a children's book by Todd Parr. It was published in 2001 by Little, Brown & Co. (ISBN 0-316-66603-3). The book has become a popular resource for teaching diversity and tolerance.

Contrasts and unusual situations are presented with simple, colorful illustrations. The storylines include a kangaroo with a dog in her pouch and some sillier themes like, "It's okay to eat macaroni and cheese in the bathtub". These storylines can be the starting point to ask children if they know anyone like the characters in the book or if they see a character resembling themselves.
