= Detour for Emmy =

1993 novel by Marilyn Reynolds

- Author: Katie McShane
- Language: English
- Genre: Young adult novel
- Publisher: Morning Glory Press
- Publication date: 1993
- Publication place: United States
- Media type: Print (hardback & Paperback)
- ISBN: 0-930934-75-X
- OCLC: 27812190
- LC Class: PZ7.R3373 De 1993

Detour for Emmy is a young adult novel by Marilyn Reynolds, published in 1993 by Morning Glory Press. It deals with the impact of an unexpected pregnancy on a teenage girl. Like other novels by the author, it is based on the life challenges of her students.

== Reception ==
Detour for Emmy received the South Carolina Book Award for Young Adult Book Award in 1996. It was one of the American Library Association's Best Books for Young Adults for 1993.

The American Library Association named it the 83rd-most banned and challenged book in the United States between 2000 and 2009, as well as the sixth most challenged book in 2005. The explicit nature of the content caused it to be removed from the El Mirage, Arizona School District libraries.
