= Natasha Friend =

American author (born 1972)

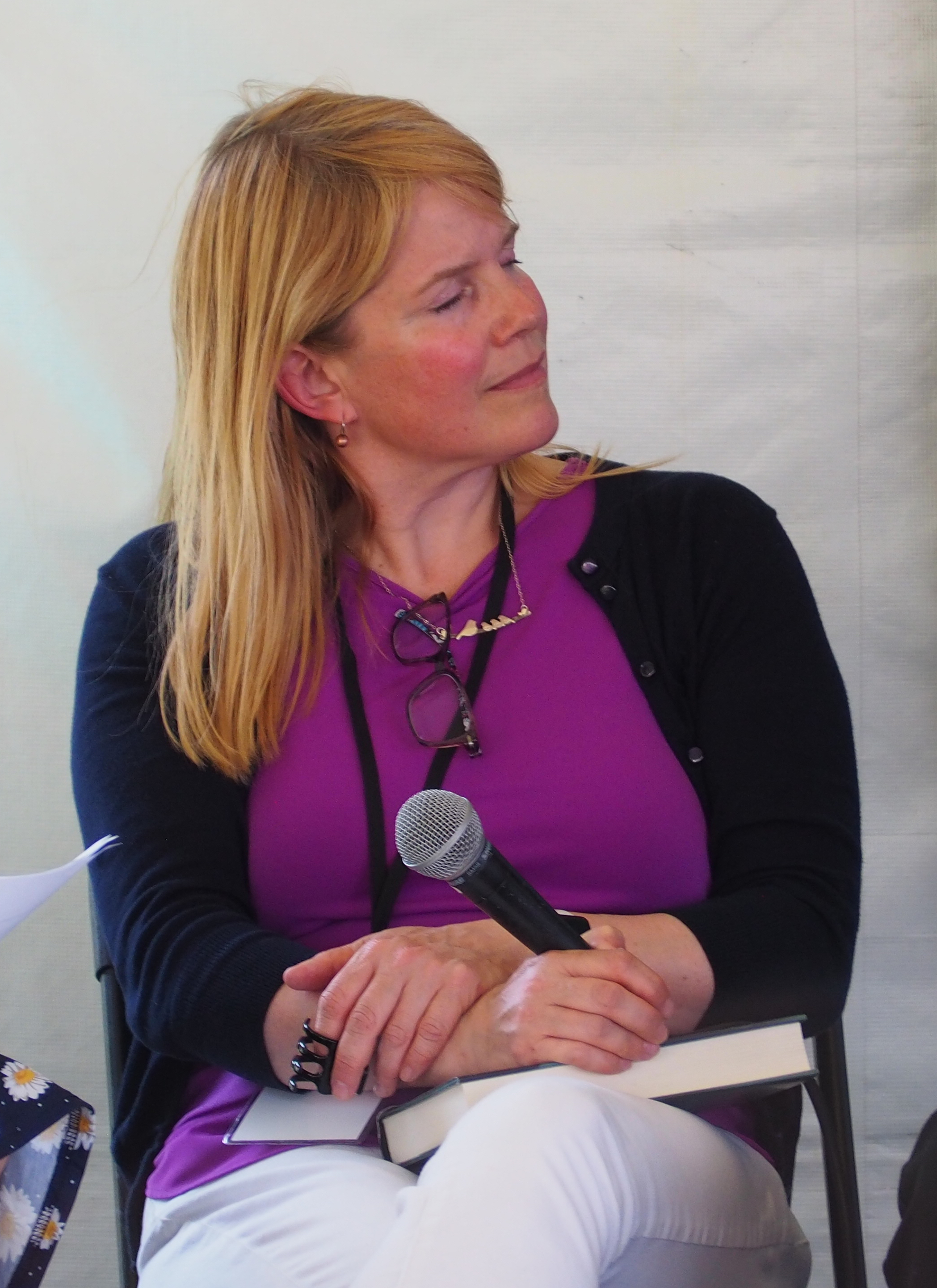
- Born: April 28, 1972 (age 54); Norwich, New York, U.S.
- Education: Bates College (BA); Clemson University (MA)
- Occupation: Author
- Notable work: Perfect
- Website: http://www.natashafriend.com

Natasha Friend (born April 28, 1972, in Norwich, New York) is an American author. Her first three books are the award-winning, young adult novels Perfect, Lush, and Bounce.

== Early life and education ==
Friend was born in a town in upstate New York, to an English professor father and poet/actress mother. She began writing books at the age of nine.

In 1994, Friend received a B.A. in psychology from Bates College in Lewiston, Maine. She earned her M.A. in English at Clemson University.

She has taught at the Brearley School in New York City, and Ecole Bilingue-International School in Cambridge, Massachusetts. Friend also served as director of the Brimmer and May Summer Camp in Chestnut Hill, Massachusetts.

== Writing career ==
Friend's writing has appeared in Family Fun magazine and the book Chicken Soup for the Volunteer's Soul. In 2004, her first book, the young adult fiction novel Perfect, won the Milkweed Prize for Children's Literature.

== Books ==
- 2004 - Perfect — Milkweed Editions
- 2006 - Lush — Scholastic Corporation
- 2009 - Bounce — Scholastic Corporation
- 2010 - For Keeps
- 2012 - My Life in Black and White
- 2016 - Where You'll Find Me
- 2017 - The Other F-Word
- 2018 - How We Roll

== Awards ==
PERFECT

- Isinglass Teen Book Award, 2008
- Golden Sower Award, 2007
- Black-Eyed Susan Award nominee, 2007–2008
- Book Sense Pick, 2006
- Milkweed Prize for Children's Literature, 2004

LUSH

- Rhode Island Teen Book Award, 2008
- A.L.A. Quick Pick for Reluctant Readers, 2006

BOUNCE

- One of NYPL's Best Books for the Teen Age, 2002

For Keeps- Parper Back 2019
