= James Lincoln Collier =

American journalist, musician and author (1928–2024)

- Born: June 29, 1928
- Died: 2024 (aged 95–96)
- Occupations: Journalist; musician; jazz commentator; author
- Relatives: Christopher Collier (brother)

James Lincoln Collier (June 29, 1928 – 2024) was an American journalist, professional musician, jazz commentator and author. Many of his non-fiction titles focussed on music theory and the history of jazz.

== Life and career ==
Collier and his brother, Christopher Collier, a history professor, together wrote several works of fiction for children and young adults. They also co-authored about a dozen books on American history. He and his son Geoffrey Lincoln Collier together published various works on jazz theory. James Lincoln Collier died in 2024.

In July 2014, Collier stirred controversy when his article "Nigger in the White House" was published in WestView News, a West Village newspaper. The article is critical of perceived racism in the far-right's opposition to President Barack Obama.

== Bibliography ==
On music and jazz

- Practical Music Theory: How music is put together from Bach to rock (1970)
- Jug Bands and Handmade Music: A creative approach to music theory and the instruments (1973)
- The Making of Jazz: A Comprehensive History. New York: Dell Publishing. 1978. p. 213 – via Internet Archive. LCCN 77-25030; ISBN 0-3952-6286-0; OCLC 468027621 (all editions).
- Louis Armstrong. An American Genius (1983)
- Duke Ellington (1987)
- Reception of Jazz in America (1988)
- Benny Goodman and the Swing Era (1989)
- Jazz: The American Theme Song (1993)
- Jazz: An American Saga (1997)
- The New Grove Dictionary of Music and Musicians (1980 to present), contributor of entries on jazz and jazz-related subjects

Journal Article Publications with son, Geoffrey Collier

- An Exploration of the Use of Tempo in Jazz (1994)
- A Study of Timing in Two Louis Armstrong Solos (2002)
- Introduction (2002)
- Studies Of Tempo Using a Double Timing Paradigm (2007)

For children and young adults

- Which Musical Instrument Shall I Play? (1969)
- Inside Jazz (1973)
- The Great Jazz Artists (1977)

Fiction for children and young adults, by the Collier brothers

- The Teddy Bear Habit (1967), about an insecure boy whose beatnik guitar teacher turns out to be a crook
- My Brother Sam Is Dead (1974) – one of Newbery Medal runners-up; one of National Book Award finalists
- Rich and Famous (1975), sequel to The Teddy Bear Habit.
- Jump Ship to Freedom (1981)
- Who Is Carrie? (1984)
- War Comes to Willy Freeman (1987)
- Chipper (2001), about a young boy in a gang.
- The Empty Mirror (2004)

American history series, by the Collier brothers

- Decision in Philadelphia (1987)
- The French and Indian War (1998)
- Slavery and the coming of the Civil War (2000)
- Progressivism, the Great Depression, and the New Deal (2001)
