= Ron Koertge =

American poet and author (born 1940)

- Born: April 22, 1940 (age 86); Olney, Illinois, US
- Occupations: Novelist; short story writer; poet

Ron Koertge (born April 22, 1940) is an American poet and author of young adult fiction. Koertge is currently the Poet Laureate of South Pasadena, California. His honors include a fellowship from the National Endowment for the Arts, a California Arts Council grant, and inclusion in numerous anthologies. His young-adult fiction has won many awards, including Friends of American Writers Young People’s Literature Award, New York Library's 100 Best Children's Books, American Library Association (ALA) Best Book, New York Public Library's Books for the Teen Age, and PEN awards. In 2017, he was awarded a Pushcart Prize.

== Life and work ==
Koertge grew up in Olney, Illinois. He received a Bachelor of Arts (BA) in 1962 from the University of Illinois Urbana-Champaign and a Master of Arts (MA) in 1965 from the University of Arizona. He was a faculty member at Pasadena City College for more than 25 years, where he taught a popular poetry writing workshop. He also taught at Hamline University in the Master of Fine Arts (MFA) in Writing for Children & Young Adults program.

Along with his wife, Koertge lives in South Pasadena, California. His house was the home of Laurie Strode in the original Halloween movie.

Koertge is currently the Poet Laureate of South Pasadena, "an honorary position given to a South Pasadena resident poet to serve as the city's official ambassador for the literary arts."

== Selected texts ==
=== Young adult and children's fiction ===
==== The Arizona Kid ====
The Arizona Kid was originally published in 1988, then republished by Candlewick Press on May 24, 2005. According to the American Library Association, it was the 75th most banned and challenged book in the United States between 1990 and 1999 due to LGBT content.

==== The Harmony Arms ====
The Harmony Arms was originally published on October 1, 1992 by Joy Street Books, then republished in September 1994 by HarperCollins Publishers. The American Library Association named it a popular book for young adults.

==== Tiger, Tiger Burning Bright ====
Tiger, Tiger Burning Bright was published in 1994 by Orchard Books. The book received the following awards:

- Notable Children’s Books (1995)
- Judy Lopez Memorial Award for Children's Literature Nominee (1995)
- Dorothy Canfield Fisher Children's Book Award Nominee (1996)

==== Confess-O-Rama ====
Confess-O-Rama was originally published in 1996 by Laurel Leaf, then republished in March 1998 by Random House Children's Books. The American Library Association named it a Popular Paperbacks for Young Adults in 2001.

==== The Brimstone Journals ====
The Brimstone Journals was originally published on February 1, 2001 by Candlewick Press, then republished in 2004. The book has received the following awards:

- American Library Association's Best Books for Young Adults (2002)
- American Library Association's Top Ten Quick Picks for Reluctant Young Adult Readers (2002)
- American Library Association's Popular Paperbacks for Young Adults (2006)

==== Margaux with an X ====
Margaux with an X was published on November 30, 2003 by Candlewick Press, then republished on August 8, 2006. The American Library Association named it one of the top ten Best Books for Young Adults in 2005.

==== Strays ====
Strays was published on May 8, 2007 by Candlewick Press, then republished on October 9, 2012. The American Library Association named it one of the top ten Best Books for Young Adults in 2008. The same year, it received the PEN Center USA Award in Children's/Young Adult Literature.

==== Stoner and Spaz series ====
The original Stoner and Spaz book was first published on May 1, 2002 by Candlewick, then republished on April 26, 2011. The book received the following awards:

- Deutscher Jugendliteraturpreis Nominee for Jugendbuch (2005)
- Georgia Peach Book Award Nominee for Honor book (2004)
- American Library Association's Amazing Audiobooks for Young Adults (2004)
- PEN Center USA Award in Children's/Young Adult Literature (2003)
- Michigan Library Association Thumbs Up! Award Nominee (2003)
- American Library Association's Best Books for Young Adults (2003)
- American Library Association's Quick Picks for Reluctant Young Adult Readers (2003)

The second book in the series, Now Playing: Stoner and Spaz II, was published on August 1, 2011 by Candlewick Press. It was named a Booklist Editors' Choice book for youth in 2011.

==== Shakespeare Bats Cleanup series ====
The first book in the series, Shakespeare Bats Cleanup, was first published on March 1, 2003 by Candlewick Press, then republished in 2006. It was nominated for the Dorothy Canfield Fisher Children's Book Award Nominee in 2005.

The second book in the series, Shakespeare Makes the Playoffs, was first published on March 9, 2010 by Candlewick Press, then republished in 2012.

=== Poetry ===
The Ogre's Wife: Poems was published on September 1, 2013 by Red Hen Press. The American Library Association named it to the 2014 list of Notable Poetry.

== Publications ==
=== Young adult and children's fiction ===
- Where the Kissing Never Stops. Published 1986 by Candlewick Press.
- The Arizona Kid. Published 1988 by Candlewick Press.
- The Boy in the Moon. Published April 1, 1990 by Joy Street Books.
- Mariposa Blues. Published January 1, 1991 by Turtleback Books.
- The Harmony Arms. Published October 1, 1992 by Joy Street Books.
- Tiger, Tiger, Burning Bright. Published March 1, 1994 by Orchard Books.
- Confess-O-Rama. Published 1996 by Laurel Leaf.
- The Heart of the City. Published March 1, 1998 by Scholastic.
- The Brimstone Journals. Published February 1, 2001 by Candlewick Press.
- Margaux with an X. Published November 30, 2003 by Candlewick Press.
- Boy Girl Boy. Published September 1, 2005 by Clarion Books.
- Strays. Published May 8, 2007 by Candlewick Press.
- Deadville. Published October 14, 2008 by Candlewick Press.
- Lies, Knives, and Girls in Red Dresses with Andrea Dezso (Illustrator). Published July 10, 2012 by Candlewick Press.
- Coaltown Jesus. Published October 8, 2013 by Candlewick Press.

=== Stoner and Spaz series ===
- Stoner & Spaz. Published May 1, 2002 by Candlewick Press
- Now Playing: Stoner & Spaz II. Published August 1, 2011 by Candlewick.

=== Shakespeare Bats Cleanup series ===
- Shakespeare Bats Cleanup. Published March 1, 2003 by Candlewick Press.
- Shakespeare Makes the Playoffs. Published March 9, 2010 by Candlewick Press.

=== Backyard Witch series ===
- Sadie's Story with Christine Heppermann and Deborah Marcero (illustrations). Published July 21, 2015 by Greenwillow Books.
- Jess's Story with Christine Heppermann and Deborah Marcero (illustrations). Published July 12, 2016 by Greenwillow Books.
- Maya's Story with Christine Heppermann and Deborah Marcero (illustrations). Published June 27, 2017 by Greenwillow Books.

=== Poetry ===
- The Father Poems. Published December 1, 1973 by Sumac Press.
- Diary Cows. Published January 1, 1982 by Little Caesar Press.
- Life on the Edge of the Continent: Selected Poems. Published January 1, 1982 by University of Arkansas Press.
- Making Love to Roget's Wife: Poems New and Selected. Published January 1, 1997 by University of Arkansas Press.
- Geography of the Forehead. Published November 2000 by University of Arkansas Press.
- Fever: poems. Published April 1, 2006 by Red Hen Press.
- Indigo. Published November 1, 2009 by Red Hen Press.
- The Ogre's Wife. Published September 1, 2013 by Red Hen Press.
- Sex World. Published September 16, 2014 by Red Hen Press.
- Vampire Planet. Published April 1, 2016 by Red Hen Press.
- Olympusville. Published April 5, 2018 by Red Hen Press.
- Yellow Moving Van. Published October 16, 2018 by University of Pittsburgh Press.

=== Academic ===
- 100 Things to Write About. Published January 24, 1997 by Pearson.

=== Contributor ===
- Six Poets. Published May 28, 1979 by Vagabond Press.
- The Maverick Poets: An Anthology. Published August 1, 1988 by Gorilla Pr.
- Tomorrowland: 10 Stories About The Future. Published October 1, 1999 by Scholastic.
- On the Fringe. Published April 1, 2001 by Dial.
- What a Song Can Do: 12 Riffs on the Power of Music. Published June 8, 2004 by Knopf Books for Young Readers.
- Destination Unexpected: Short Stories. Published August 8, 2006 by Candlewick Press.
- 13: Thirteen Stories That Capture the Agony and Ecstasy of Being Thirteen. Published October 1, 2003 by Atheneum Books for Young Readers.
- Every Man for Himself: Ten Short Stories About Being a Guy. Published 2005 by Speak.
- My Dad's a Punk: 12 Stories About Boys and Their Fathers. Published May 10, 2006 by Kingfisher.
- Twice Told: Original Stories Inspired by Original Artwork. Published December 31, 2006 by Dutton Juvenile.
- Baseball Crazy: Ten Short Stories that Cover All the Bases. Published March 13, 2008 by Dial.
- How Beautiful the Ordinary: Twelve Stories of Identity. Published December 29, 2008 by HarperTeen.
- Things I'll Never Say: Stories About Our Secret Selves. Published March 24, 2015 by Candlewick Press.
- Taking Aim: Power and Pain, Teens and Guns. Published September 8, 2015 by HarperTeen.
- Asimov's Science Fiction, April/May 2016. Published March 26, 2016 by Dell Magazines.
