= My Brother Sam Is Dead =

1974 novel by James Lincoln Collier and Christopher Collier

- Author: James Lincoln Collier and Christopher Collier
- Language: English
- Genre: Historical fiction
- Publisher: Scholastic
- Publication date: 1974
- Publication place: United States
- Media type: Print (Paperback)
- Pages: 218 pg.
- ISBN: 0-590-42792-X
- OCLC: 20572784

My Brother Sam Is Dead is a 1974 young-adult historical fiction novel by James Lincoln Collier and Christopher Collier. The book takes place in Redding, Connecticut during the American Revolution, and is told from the perspective of a young boy, Timothy Meeker (also known as Tim). The novel details Tim's brother, Samuel, and his desire to fight for the Patriots, despite his father's opposition to the war. Ultimately, Tim is forced to decide between siding with his brother and joining the colonies’ war efforts, or abiding by his father's anti-war wishes.

The novel was ranked in ALA's "Most Frequently Challenged Books" and "Banned/Challenged Books" from 1990 to 2000 and 2000 to 2009. During this time period, the novel was subject to much controversy surrounding its use in elementary school classrooms, given several counts of violence and profanity throughout the book.

== Plot ==
Narrated by 12-year-old boy Timothy (Timmy; Tim) Meeker, the story begins at the start of the Revolutionary War (1775–1783) in the Loyalist town of Redding, Connecticut. Tim's father is a local tavern owner who immediately expresses his discontent with the war. As a pacifist, Mr. Meeker feels withdrawn from the political affairs taking place among Tories and Patriots, and he urges his sons to not get involved, as he believes war only results in death.

Despite this, Timmy's 16-year-old brother, Sam, explains to his brother that he will be enlisting in the war to fight for the Patriots under General Benedict Arnold. Despite his young age, Tim is an eager reader and thus understands much of his brother's contention with the British, feeling as though England arbitrarily regulates the colonies from overseas.

Upon hearing that Sam has enlisted to fight against the British and catching him trying to steal the family rifle, Mr. Meeker throws Sam out of the house, leaving Tim conflicted with the decision to remain uninvolved or follow in his brother's footsteps. As the war continues to erupt throughout the colonies, Tim joins his father in traveling to the market at Verplanck's Point. Despite multiple warnings to avoid selling goods to Tories, Tim and his father are caught doing so. Tim is set free, but Mr. Meeker is branded a traitor and imprisoned, whereupon he dies of cholera.

The Rebels begin traveling throughout New England to loot towns for food, goods, and weaponry, and upon arriving in Redding, Tim follows the Rebels to locate his brother, now a corporal, after almost two years without seeing one another. When the Rebels seize his family's cattle, Tim steals most of them back; Sam is wrongly blamed for the theft, and when the Rebels learn of his connection to the "traitor" Meeker family, he is shot without a chance to defend himself.

Tim quickly grows infuriated with the Patriots for their responsibility for his brother's and father's deaths, despite his initial alignment with the Patriots against British colonialism. Redding also became unlivable for Tim and his mother after Sam's death, which led to them relocating to Pennsylvania. Tim recounts how his mother spent the rest of her life consumed by grief, speaking of Sam until the day of her death. Tim ultimately marries and opens a tavern of his own in his brother's memory.

== Reception ==
My Brother Sam Is Dead earned a Newbery Honor and was a finalist for the National Book Award for Children's Books in 1975. The ALA reports that My Brother Sam Is Dead, by James and Christopher Collier, was the twelfth most frequently challenged book in the period from 1990 to 2000, and the 27th most challenged book from 2000 to 2009.

According to authors Nicholas J. Karolides, Margaret. Bald, and Dawn B. Sova, the widespread controversy surrounding My Brother Sam Is Dead followed the novel's popular use in elementary school curricula in the late 1980s. The novel was commonly used in fifth to seventh grade history classes as part of Revolutionary War studies. However, the book's use received backlash from many students, teachers, and educators who deemed the novel's vivid descriptions of violence and use of profanity as highly inappropriate for children and called upon school boards to ban the book and seek alternative novels. Despite much opposition, several educators have defended the book's usage in schools. In March 2000, in Springfield, Oregon, Jerry and Kelly Dunn lobbied to have “My Brother Sam Is Dead” removed from the district’s public schools after discovering the novel was read in their daughter's fifth-grade classroom. Roma Roderick, the teacher who assigned the book, argues that the novel provides “an honest, hard-hitting look at war.” Roderick explains that the novel's profanity does not concern her as an elementary school educator, as long as she teaches her students that violence and swearing, despite being discussed in the novel, are not condoned.

=== Challenges (1996-2000) ===
==== April 1996 ====
In the Jefferson County Public Schools (Colorado), Marcia Super filed a challenge to My Brother Sam Is Dead after discovering that the novel was being taught in her granddaughter's fifth grade classroom. Super cited twenty-five counts of profane language.

==== September 1996 ====
At Antioch Elementary School (California), Judy Nelson filed several complaints surrounding the use of My Brother Sam Is Dead in her son's fifth-grade social studies class. Nelson's discomfort stemmed from the book's profane language and descriptions of violence. As a result, the Antioch School Board ordered skipping over the novel's graphic content when read aloud in the classroom.

==== March 1998 ====
At McSwain Elementary School (Virginia), two parents, Linda Bailey and Beverly Dudley, expressed their concerns about the use of profanity and graphic descriptions of violent war stories that take place within the novel. The book was being taught in their child's fifth-grade classroom, where they felt that it was both inappropriate to be taught at such a young age and should be removed from the curriculum.

==== December 1998 ====
My Brother Sam Is Dead was removed from use in fifth-grade classrooms in the Hampton County (Virginia) schools. Two parents, Michael Harries and Richard Antcliff, noted the novel's inclusion of profane language like “‘damn,’ bastard,’ and ‘hell,” and urged that the book be immediately removed from the elementary curriculum.

==== November 1999 ====
In Oak Brook Elementary School (Illinois), parents expressed concerns regarding the novel's foul language and violent content. Debby Stangaroni, the parent of a sixth-grade student at the school, voiced specific concerns, claiming that her child was left “disturbed” after reading the book in class.

==== June 2000 ====
In the Southern Columbia school district (Pennsylvania), school officials voted to black out words like “‘dammit,’ ‘damn you,’ and ‘bastard,’” after a parent objected to the use of what was perceived as inappropriate phrases. Curriculum Director in the district, Roy Clippinger, shared that “the swear words really added nothing to the book and really took nothing away from it,” prompting the ultimate decision to keep the book in use while also filtering its language.

== Legacy ==
The song 'Sam (Is Dead)' by Odd Future members Tyler, The Creator and Domo Genesis is titled after the novel.
