= Sex Education (novel) =

1995 novel by Jenny Davis

Sex Education is a 1995 book by the American author Jenny Davis. It was written for readers in grades 9-12 and tells the story of two teens who, working together on a term project for their sex education class, are instructed to care for someone else for the semester. They choose a lonely, pregnant neighbor, a task that proves more difficult than they anticipated.

The book has been the subject of many legal challenges, according to the American Library Association. The American Library Association has added the book to its list of "Frequently Challenged Young Adult Books" and its list of the "100 most frequently challenged books: 1990-1999."
