= My Mom's Having a Baby (book) =

Children's book by Dori Hillestad

- Author: Dori Hillestad Butler
- Language: English
- Publisher: Albert Whitman & Company
- Publication date: January 1, 2005
- Publication place: United States
- Media type: Print

My Mom's Having a Baby is a children's book that was written by Dori Hillestad Butler and Illustrated by Carol Thompson. The book was published by Albert Whitman & Company in 2005, but was banned in several states due to its content. It was the fourth most censored book in the United States in 2011 and is regarded as a highly controversial piece of children's literature.

== Plot ==
My Mom's Having a Baby is narrated by a young girl named Elizabeth whose mother is pregnant with another child. Elizabeth takes the reader through the nine months of her mother's pregnancy and explains everything that she learns along the way. At first Elizabeth learns about doctor's visits and ultrasounds, and eventually she learns the facts of life from her mother. When Elizabeth's mother is in the hospital having the baby Elizabeth stays with her grandmother, and in the end Elizabeth is thrilled to introduce her new little brother Michael.

== Censorship ==
My Mom's Having a Baby was censored in Oregon, Indiana, Kansas, Colorado, Georgia, Nevada, Texas, and Florida. It was the fourth most censored book in the United States in 2011, and was censored for nudity, sex education, and unsuitability to the age group. The book contains nudity in order to provide a detailed description of how babies are created. The amount of detail in the explanation provided in the story has created controversy among parents due to the accuracy with which Butler describes the act of sex. The illustrations are controversial because they depict both male and female nudity, as well as the parents together under the covers in a way that implies they are having sex.

In an interview with Fox News, Butler defended her work by stating that it is in the children's non-fiction section along with other explanatory children's books about childbirth, disease, and war. She stated that her book was meant to be explained to a child by a parent, and that parents should not assume that every book in the children's section can or should be read without supervision.

== Awards ==
My Mom's Having a Baby received a starred review from Booklist, and was Booklist Editor's Choice Book for 2005 directly after its publication. It is also a Top Ten Science - Technology award winner. Butler states in her post as a guest blogger on Write All the Words! that she explained sex to her children in the very same way that she explains it in the book.
