= Eduardo P. Archetti =

Argentine anthropologist, sociologist, essayist, and educator

Eduardo P. Archetti or more affectionately Lali Archetti (April 12, 1943, in Santiago del Estero – June 6, 2005, in Oslo) was an Argentine anthropologist and sociologist, essayist and educator, considered one of the most original social scientists in Latin America. He was a pioneer of the anthropological approach to sports and its relationship to the collective imagination. He died of cancer in Norway, while still the director of the Department of Social Anthropology at the University of Oslo.

== Education ==
Archetti was born in the province of Santiago del Estero on 12 April 1943. His father was a doctor. He studied at the Military School “General Paz” in Córdoba and completed his secondary education at the Absalón Rojas School in 1960.

He later pursued studies at the University of Buenos Aires. He began to study law but only spent three years. He became interested in sociology, getting acquainted with Gino Germani, Juan Carlos Portantiero and Eliseo Verón. He graduated in 1967. He then travelled to Paris. He went to the Practical School of Advanced Studies (la École Pratique des Hautes Études). During this time, he took courses with Claude Lévi-Strauss and Maurice Godelier and was introduced to social anthropology.

Interested in studying the rural phenomenon in Latin America, he attempted to realize his doctoral thesis in Cuba. He, however, did not receive the subsidy nor authorization from the Cuban government. He decided on the northern Santa Fé province, Argentina. He was based in the Friulian colonies which produced cotton in the region. Supervised by Godelier, he completed his investigation and presented his doctoral thesis entitled 'Economy and trade union organization among colonists in Northern Santa Fe, Argentina' in 1976. The military coup hastened his return to Europe. He defended his thesis at the University of Oslo and was designated Research Fellow in the Department of Anthropology.

== Work ==
Archetti was a founding member of the European Association of Social Anthropologists. However, his interest in Latin America would remain the focus of his work. He developed a masters program in Rural Sociology at FLACSO-Quito and was a consultant to the World Bank in Zambia, Burkina Faso and Ecuador. He produced his famous study on the guinea pig, which analyzed the relationship between culture, identity and development. With the return to democracy, he resumed his research in Argentina. He developed an anthropological approach to the world of football, polo, tango and motorsport.

According to Archetti:

The national identity of Argentines was formed by polo players, football players and dancers of tango, which early in the century represented us abroad (...) the importance of the export of meat and grains is always spoken of, but they were not the most important commodities, if we consider that the music and sports idols were the ones who created the romantic image that people overseas had of the Argentines. But like a game of mirrors, the local collective imagination of national identity came to reflect what outsiders see. The clearest example is cited by Adolfo Bioy Casares, when he recalls that the dress of the Gauchos that started to become popular inland was a copy of that which was used in the films by Rudolph Valentino.

== Publications ==
- Family Farming and capital accumulation in the Argentine countryside (with Kristi Anne Stolen, 1975)
- The guinea pig (1992)
- Hybridization, diversity and generalization in the ideological world of soccer and polo (1997)
- The pasture, the track and the ring: The homelands of Argentine sports (2001)
- Masculinities: football, polo and tango in Argentina (2003)

== Tribute ==
The Centre for Social Anthropology at the Institute of Economic and Social Development (CAS-IDES) provides, since 2006, the "Eduardo Archetti" prize for the best anthropological master's thesis from Argentina, Norway, Ecuador and Guatemala.

== See also ==
- Interview (in Spanish) with Archetti by Juana Libedinsky of the newspaper, La Nación
