= Lynda Madaras =

Lynda Madaras (born 1947) is an educator and author. She has written a number of books on puberty including two (What’s Happening to my Body? Book for Girls: A Growing-Up Guide for Parents & Daughters, and What’s Happening to my Body? Book for Boys: A Growing-Up Guide for Parents & Sons) that are on the American Library Association's list of 100 Most Frequently Challenged Books 1990-2000. Her books have won numerous awards, including recognition as an American Library Association Best Books for Young Adults. Her other titles include My Body, My Self for Girls, My Body, My Self for Boys, Ready, Set, Grow!, On Your Mark, Get Set, Grow!, Womancare, Child's Play, and The Alphabet Connection.

== Personal life ==
She taught health and puberty education in California schools for more than twenty-five years. She has appeared on CNN, PBS, Oprah, and The Today Show.
