= Vanessa Hudgens discography =

Cataloging of published recordings by Vanessa Hudgens

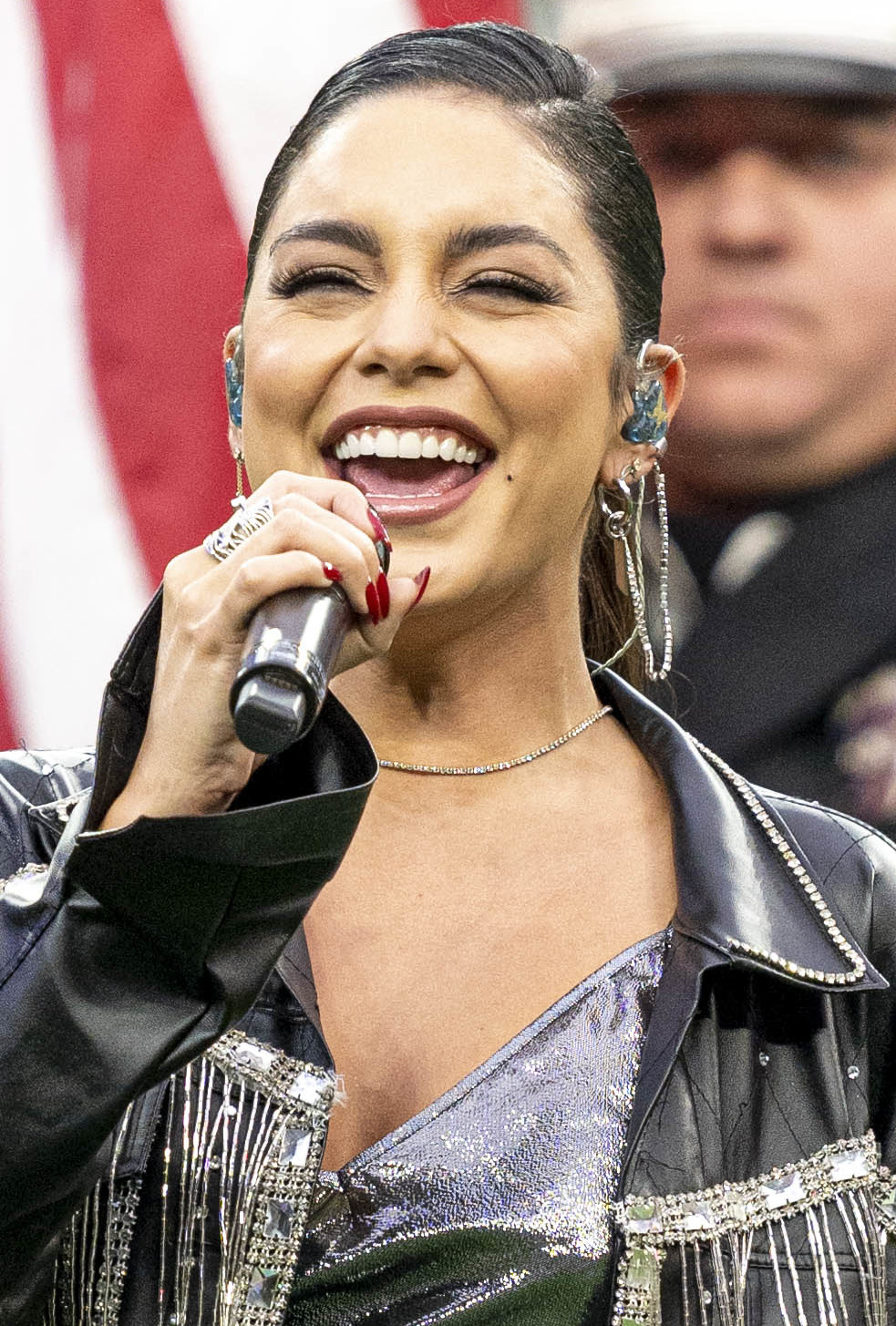
- Hudgens performing the national anthem at the a 2021 WFT vs LVR game.
- Studio albums: 2
- Soundtrack albums: 6
- Singles: 15
- Music videos: 7
- Promotional singles: 2

The discography of Vanessa Hudgens consists of two studio albums, six soundtrack albums, fifteen singles, and seven music videos. Hudgens has also recorded several other releases as her High School Musical character Gabriella Montez in the High School Musical film series' soundtracks. The songs she has recorded entered several international music charts and most of them were duets with the cast members of the High School Musical series. Hudgens' biggest hit song is the High School Musical duet "Breaking Free", which peaked at number four on the Billboard Hot 100 chart.

In 2006, Hudgens signed a record deal with Hollywood Records. Her debut solo studio album, V, was released on September 26, 2006 in the United States. The album reached number twenty-four on the Billboard 200, selling 34,000 copies in its first week. In February 2007, the album was certified Gold for shipments of 500,000 copies to U.S. retailers. The album has sold 570,000 copies in the United States as of April 2008 and was certified Platinum in Argentina for sales of 8,000 copies. Hudgens' second solo studio album, Identified, was released on July 1, 2008 in North America and reached number twenty-three on the Billboard 200, selling 22,000 copies in its first week in the US.

== Albums ==
=== Studio albums ===
List of studio albums, with selected chart positions, sales figures and certifications
Title	Album details	Peak chart positions										Sales	Certifications
Title	Album details	US	AUT	CAN	FRA	GER	IRE	ITA	NZ	SWI	UK	Sales	Certifications
V	Released: September 26, 2006; Label: Hollywood; Format: CD, LP, digital download, streaming	24	—	91	59	—	27	42	35	—	86	US: 570,000 (Note: United States sales figures for V as of April 2008.)	RIAA: Gold
Identified	Released: June 24, 2008; Label: Hollywood; Format: CD, digital download, streaming	23	35	37	—	60	37	—	—	74	46		
"—" denotes a recording that did not chart or was not released in that territory.

=== Soundtrack albums ===
List of soundtrack albums, with selected chart positions and certifications
Title	Album details	Peak chart positions										Certifications
Title	Album details	US	AUS	AUT	CAN	FRA	GER	ITA Comp.	NZ	SWI	UK Comp.	Certifications
High School Musical	Released: January 10, 2006; Formats: CD, digital download; Label: Walt Disney	1	1	13	23	6	22	1	1	63	1	RIAA: 5× Platinum; ARIA: 2× Platinum; BPI: 4× Platinum; BVMI: Platinum; IFPI AUT: Platinum; MC: Platinum; RMNZ: 3× Platinum; SNEP: Gold
High School Musical 2	Released: August 14, 2007; Formats: CD, digital download; Label: Walt Disney	1	4	2	1	12	5	1	3	6	1	RIAA: 3× Platinum; ARIA: Platinum; BPI: 2× Platinum; BVMI: Platinum; IFPI AUT: 2× Platinum; IFPI SWI: Gold; MC: 2× Platinum; RMNZ: 2× Platinum; SNEP: Gold
High School Musical 3: Senior Year	Released: October 21, 2008; Formats: CD, digital download; Label: Walt Disney	2	4	1	2	6	3	1	1	6	1	RIAA: Platinum; ARIA: Platinum; BPI: Platinum; BVMI: Platinum; IFPI AUT: Gold; IFPI SWI: Gold; MC: 2× Platinum; RMNZ: 2× Platinum; SNEP: Platinum
Gigi (New Broadway Cast Recording)	Released: May 12, 2015; Formats: CD, digital download; Label: DMI	—	—	—	—	—	—	—	—	—	—	
Grease Live! (Music from the Television Event)	Released: January 31, 2016; Formats: CD, digital download; Label: Paramount, Republic	37	85	—	—	—	—	—	—	—	—	
Tick, Tick... Boom!	Released: November 12, 2021; Formats: CD, digital download; Label: Maisie Music Publishing, Masterworks Broadway	—	—	—	—	—	—	—	—	—	5	
"—" denotes a recording that did not chart or was not released in that territory.

== Singles ==
=== As lead artist ===
List of singles as lead artist, with selected chart positions and certifications, showing year released and album name
Title	Year	Peak chart positions										Certifications	Album
Title	Year	US	AUS	CAN	FRA	GER	IRE	ITA	NZ	SWI	UK	Certifications	Album
"Breaking Free" (with Zac Efron and Drew Seeley)	2006	4	13	—	—	46	17	17	4	—	9	RIAA: Platinum; BPI: Gold; BVMI: Gold; RMNZ: Gold	High School Musical
"Come Back to Me"	2006	55	36	—	12	58	—	8	6	—	100	RIAA: Gold	V
"Say OK"	2007	61	—	—	—	—	—	39	—	—	124	RIAA: Gold	V
"You Are the Music in Me" (with Zac Efron)	2007	31	86	54	—	75	12	—	—	75	26	RIAA: Gold; BPI: Silver	High School Musical 2
"Gotta Go My Own Way" (with Zac Efron)	2007	34	—	67	—	67	36	39	—	59	40	RIAA: Platinum; BPI: Silver; RMNZ: Gold	High School Musical 2
"Everyday" (with Zac Efron)	2007	65	—	— (Note: "Everyday" did not enter the Billboard Canadian Hot 100, but peaked at number 64 on the Canadian Digital Song Sales chart.)	—	67	47	48	—	81	59	RIAA: Gold; BPI: Silver	High School Musical 2
"Sneakernight"	2008	88	94	95	—	98	—	—	—	—	164	RIAA: Gold	Identified
"Right Here, Right Now" (with Zac Efron)	2008	— (Note: "Right Here, Right Now" did not enter the Billboard Hot 100, but peaked at number 19 on the Bubbling Under Hot 100 chart.)	—	—	—	92	—	—	—	—	137		High School Musical 3: Senior Year
"—" denotes a recording that did not chart or was not released in that territory.

=== As featured artist ===
List of singles as featured artist, with selected chart positions and certifications, showing year released and album name
Title	Year	Peak chart positions									Certifications	Album
Title	Year	US	AUS	CAN	DEN	IRE	ITA	NZ	SWI	UK	Certifications	Album
"We're All in This Together" (among High School Musical cast)	2006	34	86	—	—	31	47	14	—	40	RIAA: Gold; BPI: Silver; RMNZ: Gold	High School Musical
"What Time Is It?" (among High School Musical 2 cast)	2007	6	20	66	—	10	45	—	—	20	RIAA: Gold	High School Musical 2
"Now or Never" (among High School Musical 3: Senior Year cast)	2008	68	62	72	18	42	29	—	64	41	RIAA: Gold	High School Musical 3: Senior Year
"A Night to Remember" (among High School Musical 3: Senior Year cast)	2008	— (Note: "A Night to Remember" did not enter the Billboard Hot 100, but peaked at number eight on the Bubbling Under Hot 100 chart.)	96	—	—	—	—	—	—	94		High School Musical 3: Senior Year
"Reminding Me" (Shawn Hook featuring Vanessa Hudgens)	2017	—	—	30	—	—	—	—	—	—	MC: 2× Platinum	My Side of Your Story
"Lay with Me" (Phantoms featuring Vanessa Hudgens)	2018	—	—	—	—	—	—	—	—	—		Non-album single
"30/90" (with Andrew Garfield, Joshua Henry, Robin de Jesús, Alexandra Shipp and Mj Rodriguez)	2021	—	—	—	—	55	—	—	—	60		Tick, Tick... Boom!
"—" denotes a recording that did not chart or was not released in that territory.

=== Promotional singles ===
List of promotional singles, with selected chart positions, showing year released and album name
Title	Year	Peak chart positions	Album
Title	Year	US Dance	Album
"Let's Dance" (Live)	2007	—	V
"$$$ex" (with YLA)	2013	11	Non-album promotional single
"—" denotes a recording that did not chart or was not released in that territory.

== Other charted songs ==
List of other charted songs, with selected chart positions and certifications, showing year released and album name
Title	Year	Peak chart positions							Certifications	Album
Title	Year	US	AUS	CAN Dig.	ITA	JPN	SWI	UK	Certifications	Album
"Start of Something New" (with Zac Efron and Drew Seeley)	2006	28	—	—	33	—	—	90	RIAA: Gold; BPI: Silver	High School Musical
"What I've Been Looking For (Reprise)" (with Drew Seeley)	2006	67	—	—	—	—	—	—		High School Musical
"When There Was Me and You"	2006	72	—	—	—	—	—	184		High School Musical
"Work This Out" (among High School Musical 2 cast)	2007	— (Note: "Work This Out" did not enter the Billboard Hot 100, but peaked at number 10 on the Bubbling Under Hot 100 chart.)	—	—	—	—	—	78		High School Musical 2
"All for One" (among High School Musical 2 cast)	2007	92	—	62	—	—	—	87		High School Musical 2
"Identified"	2008	—	—	—	—	98	—	—		Identified
"Can I Have This Dance" (with Zac Efron)	2008	98	84	—	—	—	80	81	RIAA: Platinum; BPI: Silver; RMNZ: Gold	High School Musical 3: Senior Year
"Just Wanna Be with You" (with Zac Efron, Lucas Grabeel and Olesya Rulin)	2008	—	—	—	—	—	—	153		High School Musical 3: Senior Year
"High School Musical" (among High School Musical 3: Senior Year cast)	2008	—	—	—	—	—	—	105		High School Musical 3: Senior Year
"—" denotes a recording that did not chart or was not released in that territory.

== Other appearances ==
Title	Year	Other artist(s)	Album
"Colors of the Wind"	2007	—N/a	Disneymania 5
"Still There for Me"	2007	Corbin Bleu	Another Side
"Everything I Own"	2009	I Can't Go On, I'll Go On	Bandslam
"Winter Wonderland"	2009	—N/a	A Very Special Christmas 7

== Music videos ==
Title	Year	Director
As lead artist
"Come Back to Me"	2006	Chris Applebaum
"Say OK" (first version)	2007	Chris Applebaum
"Say OK" (second version)	2007	Darren Grant
"Sneakernight"	2008	R. Malcolm Jones
"$$$ex" (with YLA)	2013	YLA
As featured artist
"Reminding Me" (Shawn Hook featuring Vanessa Hudgens)	2017	Aya Tanimura
"Lay with Me" (Phantoms featuring Vanessa Hudgens)	2018	The Dads
Guest appearances
"Where's the Love?" (The Black Eyed Peas featuring The World)	2016	Michael Jurkovac

== See also ==
- List of Vanessa Hudgens performances
