= Identified Summer Tour =

2008 concert tour by Vanessa Hudgens

- Continental tour by Vanessa Hudgens
- Location: North America
- Associated album: Identified
- Start date: August 1, 2008
- End date: September 13, 2008
- Legs: 2
- No. of shows: 26 in North America

Vanessa Hudgens concert chronology
- High School Musical: The Concert (2006-07); Identified Summer Tour (2008)

The Identified Summer Tour was the debut solo concert tour – after High School Musical: The Concert – by American singer and actress Vanessa Hudgens. Marked as the singer's debut headlining tour, it supported her second studio album, Identified as well as performing songs from her debut record V. The tour primarily reached the United States, Mexico and Canada.

== Background ==
Vanessa Hudgens's tour playing at venues in the United States and Canada to promote her debut albums V and Identified. The tour became a major success with critics and spectators alike, selling out every show within the United States. She had Corbin Bleu, Jordan Pruitt and Mandy Moore as opening acts on the tour.

== Opening act ==
- Jordan Pruitt (August 8)
- Drew Seeley (August 15 and August 27)
- Disney Under the Stars (August 23)
- Mandy Moore (September 9–13)

== Set list ==
1. "Sneakernight"
2. "Let Go"
3. "Never Underestimate a Girl"
4. "Identified"
5. "Say OK"
6. "Amazed"
7. "First Bad Habit"
8. "Don't Ask Why"
9. "Let's Dance"
10. "Hook It Up"
11. "Last Night"
12. "Gotta Go My Own Way"
13. "Come Back to Me"

== Tour dates ==
Date	City	Country	Venue
North America
August 1, 2008^{[A]}	Bessemer	United States	Coca-Cola Amphitheater
August 2, 2008^{[B]}	Baton Rouge	United States	Coca-Cola Stage
August 5, 2008^{[C]}	West Allis	United States	Miller Lite Main Stage
August 7, 2008^{[D]}	Austell	United States	Music Mill Amphitheatre
August 8, 2008^{[E]}	Jackson	United States	Jackson County Fair Grandstand
August 9, 2008^{[F]}	Fairlea	United States	State Fair of West Virginia Grandstand
August 12, 2008^{[G]}	Midland	United States	Midland County Fair Grandstand
August 14, 2008^{[H]}	Des Moines	United States	Iowa State Fair Grandstand
August 15, 2008^{[I]}	Louisville	United States	Freedom Hall
August 16, 2008^{[J]}	Springfield	United States	Illinois State Fair Grandstand
August 18, 2008^{[K]}	Meadville	United States	Crawford County Fair Grandstand
August 19, 2008^{[L]}	Jackson Township	United States	Northern Star Arena
August 22, 2008^{[M]}	Sacramento	United States	Golden1 Stage
August 23, 2008^{[N]}	Salem	United States	The Pavilion
August 24, 2008^{[O]}	Vancouver	Canada	Rogers Amphitheatre
August 26, 2008	Dayton	United States	Fifth Third Field
August 27, 2008^{[P]}	Geddes	United States	Mohegan Sun Grandstand
August 28, 2008^{[Q]}	Canfield	United States	Canfield Fair Grandstand
August 30, 2008^{[R]}	Rockford	United States	Miller Lite Great Lawn
September 5, 2008^{[S]}	Salt Lake City	United States	Dish Network Grandstand
September 6, 2008^{[T]}	Albuquerque	United States	Tingley Coliseum
September 7, 2008	Santa Monica	United States	Third Street Promenade
September 9, 2008	Monterrey	Mexico	Arena Monterrey
September 11, 2008	Puebla	Mexico	Auditorio Siglo XXI
September 12, 2008	Zapopan	Mexico	Telmex Auditorium
September 13, 2008	Mexico City	Mexico	Plaza México

Festivals and other miscellaneous performances

^{A} First Financial Bank’s Friday Night Concert Series
^{B} Blue Bayou and Dixie Landin' Summer Concert Series
^{C} Wisconsin State Fair
^{D} Sunday Rocks!
^{E} Jackson County Fair
^{F} State Fair of West Virginia
^{G} Children's Day
^{H} Iowa State Fair
^{I} Kentucky State Fair
^{J} Illinois State Fair
^{K} Crawford County Fair
^{L} Six Flags Summer Concert Series
^{M} California State Fair
^{N} Oregon State Fair
^{O} Fair at the PNE
^{P} Great New York State Fair
^{Q} Canfield Fair
^{R} On the Waterfront Festival
^{S} Utah State Fair
^{T} New Mexico State Fair

Cancellations and rescheduled shows

August 9, 2008	Hamburg, New York	Erie County Fair Grandstand	Cancelled; concert was a part of the Erie County Fair
