= List of Vanessa Hudgens performances =

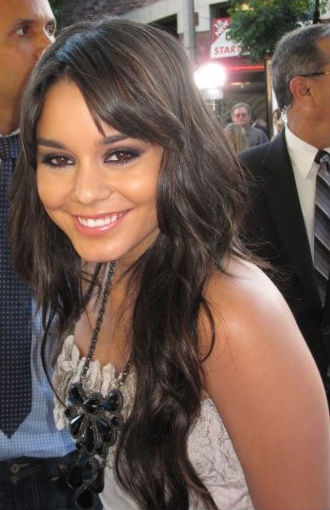
Hudgens in 2009

American actress and singer Vanessa Hudgens made her film debut taking a supporting role in the drama Thirteen (2003). She had her career breakthrough taking the role of Gabriella Montez in the Disney Channel Original Movie High School Musical (2006). She reprised the role in High School Musical 2 (2007) and High School Musical 3: Senior Year (2008). She then took leading roles in films such as Beastly (2011), Sucker Punch (2011), Journey 2: The Mysterious Island (2012), and Spring Breakers (2013). She later starred in a string of Netflix Christmas films such as The Princess Switch (2018), The Knight Before Christmas (2019), The Princess Switch: Switched Again (2020), and The Princess Switch 3: Romancing the Star (2021).

On television, she starred in Fox's live musical productions of Grease Live! (2016) and Rent: Live (2019). She has served as a judge on Project Runway All Stars in 2016, So You Think You Can Dance from 2017 to 2018, and RuPaul's Drag Race All Stars in 2018. She also competed on Drop the Mic in 2017 and The Masked Singer in 2024 winning both. She has hosted shows such as the 2017 Billboard Music Awards, the 2020 MTV Movie & TV Awards, and the 2022 MTV Movie & TV Awards. She has also served as the pre-show host for the Academy Awards in 2022, 2023, and 2024.

Hudgens made her stage debut playing Cindy-Lou Who in a San Diego production of Dr. Seuss' How the Grinch Stole Christmas! The Musical (1998). She played Mimi Marquez in the musical revival of Jonathan Larson's Rent (2010) at the Hollywood Bowl. She made her Broadway theater debut in The 24 Hour Plays (2012). She took on the title role in the 2015 musical revival of Lerner & Loewe's Gigi both at the Kennedy Center and on Broadway. She played Vanessa in the Kennedy Center's production of the musical revival of Lin-Manuel Miranda's In the Heights (2018).

== Credits ==
=== Film ===
| Year | Title | Role | Notes | Ref. |
|---|---|---|---|---|
| 2003 | Thirteen | Noel | | |
| 2004 | Thunderbirds | Tin-Tin Kyrano | | |
| 2008 | High School Musical 3: Senior Year | Gabriella Montez | | |
| 2009 | Bandslam | Sa5m | | |
| 2009 | The Ultimate Idol | Herself | Documentary | |
| 2011 | Beastly | Lindy Taylor | | |
| 2011 | Sucker Punch | Blondie | | |
| 2012 | Journey 2: The Mysterious Island | Kailani Laguatan | | |
| 2012 | Spring Breakers | Candy | | |
| 2013 | Choose You | Ex-girlfriend | Short film | |
| 2013 | The Frozen Ground | Cindy Paulson | | |
| 2013 | Machete Kills | Cereza Desdemona | | |
| 2013 | Gimme Shelter | Agnes "Apple" Bailey | | |
| 2015 | Freaks of Nature | Lorelei | | |
| 2018 | Dog Days | Tara | | |
| 2018 | The Princess Switch | Stacy De Novo / Lady Margaret | | |
| 2018 | Second Act | Zoe | | |
| 2019 | Polar | Camille | | |
| 2019 | The Knight Before Christmas | Brooke Winters | Also producer | |
| 2020 | Bad Boys for Life | Kelly | | |
| 2020 | The Princess Switch: Switched Again | Stacy / Margaret / Fiona | Also producer | |
| 2021 | My Little Pony: A New Generation | Sunny Starscout | Voice role | |
| 2021 | Tick, Tick... Boom! | Karessa Johnson | | |
| 2021 | The Princess Switch 3: Romancing the Star | Fiona Pembroke / Queen Margaret / Stacy | Also producer | |
| 2022 | Asking for It | Beatrice | | |
| 2023 | Dead Hot: Season of the Witch | Herself | Documentary; also co-executive producer | |
| 2023 | Downtown Owl | Naomi | | |
| 2024 | French Girl | Ruby Collins | | |
| 2024 | Bad Boys: Ride or Die | Kelly | | |
| TBD | Untitled Paul Soriano-directed travel documentary † | Herself | Post-production | |
| TBD | Quiet Storm † | TBA | Post-production | |
| TBD | Mini War † | Olivia | Post-production | |

Key
| † | Denotes films that have not yet been released |

=== Television ===
| Year | Title | Role | Notes |
|---|---|---|---|
| 2002 | Still Standing | Tiffany | Episode: "Still Rocking" |
| 2002 | Robbery Homicide Division | Nicole | Episode: "Had" |
| 2003 | The Brothers García | Lindsay | Episode: "New Tunes" |
| 2005 | Quintuplets | Carmen | Episode: "The Coconut Kapow" |
| 2006 | Drake & Josh | Rebecca | Episode: "Little Sibling" |
| 2006 | High School Musical | Gabriella Montez | Television film |
| 2006 | The Suite Life of Zack & Cody | Corrie | Recurring role (season 2) |
| 2007 | High School Musical 2 | Gabriella Montez | Television film |
| 2009 | Robot Chicken | Lara Lor-Van / Butterbear / Erin Esurance (voices) | Episode: "Especially the Animal Keith Crofford" |
| 2012 | Punk'd | Herself | Episode: "Lucy Hale" |
| 2016 | High School Musical: 10th Anniversary | Herself | Television special |
| 2016 | Grease Live! | Betty Rizzo | Television special |
| 2016 | Project Runway All Stars | Herself | Episode: "Let it Flow"; guest judge (season 5) |
| 2017 | Powerless | Emily Locke | Lead role |
| 2017 | 2017 Billboard Music Awards | Herself | Television special; host |
| 2017 | Running Wild with Bear Grylls | Herself | Episode: "Vanessa Hudgens" |
| 2017 | Drop the Mic | Herself | Winner; Episode: "Vanessa Hudgens vs. Michael Bennett" |
| 2017–2018 | So You Think You Can Dance | Herself | Seasons 14–15; judge |
| 2018 | RuPaul's Drag Race All Stars | Herself | Guest judge; episode: "All-Star Variety Show" (season 3) |
| 2018–2019 | Drunk History | Joan of Arc / Marge Callaghan / Mata Hari | Episodes: "The Middle Ages", "Baseball", "Femme Fatales" (seasons 5, 6) |
| 2019 | Rent: Live | Maureen Johnson | Television special |
| 2020 | MTV Movie & TV Awards: Greatest of All Time | Herself | Television special |
| 2020 | The Disney Family Singalong | Herself | Television special |
| 2021 | The Boulet Brothers' Dragula | Herself | Guest judge; episode: "Nosferatu Beach Party" (season 4) |
| 2021 | Savage x Fenty Show Vol. 3 | Herself | Television special |
| 2022 | 94th Academy Awards | Herself | Television special |
| 2022 | 2022 Met Gala Live | Herself | Livestream special; host |
| 2022 | 2022 MTV Movie & TV Awards | Herself | Television special; host |
| 2022 | Entergalactic | Karina (voice) | Television special; voice role |
| 2022 | Eli Roth’s Haunted House: Trick-VR-Treat | Fairy/dollmaker | VR web special |
| 2023 | 95th Academy Awards | Herself | Television special |
| 2023 | Rennervations | Herself | Episode: "Chicago: Building a Mobile Music Bus (ft. Vanessa Hudgens)" |
| 2023 | Fright Krewe | Madison (voice) | Recurring role (season 1) |
| 2024 | The Masked Singer | Herself / Goldfish | Winner (season 11) |
| 2024 | 96th Academy Awards | Herself | Television special |

=== Theater ===
| Year | Title | Role | Venue(s) |
|---|---|---|---|
| 1998 | Dr. Seuss' How the Grinch Stole Christmas! The Musical | Cindy-Lou Who | Old Globe Theatre |
| 1998 | The King and I | Unknown | Various locations |
| 1999 | Damn Yankees | Unknown | Various locations |
| 1999 | The Wizard of Oz | Dorothy Gale | Various locations |
| 2000 | Cinderella | Cinderella | Various locations |
| 2000 | The Little Mermaid | Sebastian (9:52–9:55) | Various locations |
| 2001 | Charlotte's Web | Fern Arable | Various locations |
| 2001 | The Hunchback of Notre Dame | Quasimodo | Various locations |
| 2002 | A Christmas Carol | Unknown | Various locations |
| 2002 | Carousel | Unknown | Various locations |
| 2003 | Evita | Unknown | Various locations |
| 2003 | The Music Man | Unknown | Various locations |
| 2010 | Rent | Mimi Marquez | Hollywood Bowl |
| 2012 | The 24 Hour Plays | Vanessa | Broadway |
| 2015 | Gigi | Gigi | Kennedy Center / Broadway |
| 2018 | In the Heights | Vanessa | Kennedy Center |
| 2019 | The Notebook | Middle Allie | Susan Stein Shiva Theater |

== See also ==
- Vanessa Hudgens discography
