= Silya =

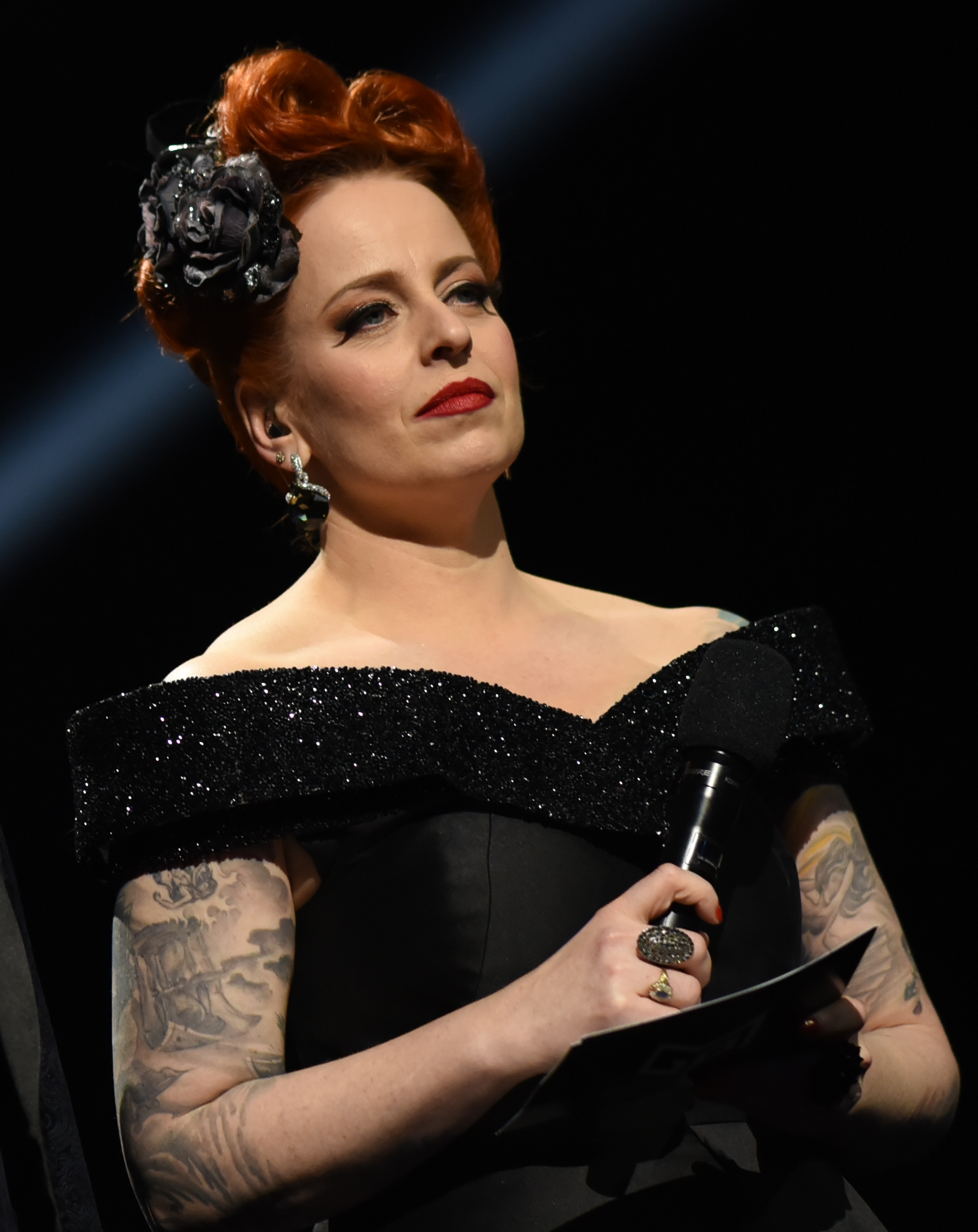
- Silya (2018)

Background information
- Born: Silje Haugum Nymoen; January 3, 1978 (age 48); Oslo, Norway
- Occupation: Musician, singer, songwriter, actor, tv-host
- Years active: 1998-
- Label: Capitana Music
- Member of: Silya & The Sailors
- Website: www.silya.com

Silya Nymoen (Silje Haugum Nymoen, born January 3, 1978) is a Norwegian singer-songwriter based in Oslo. She is the lead singer and songwriter in the band Silya & The Sailors.

== Early life ==
Silya was singing and playing classical piano by age 8. She majored in contemporary jazz dance at The Oslo National Academy of Art.

== Multicyde ==
Silya first gained success being the lead singer of the Norwegian hip hop/pop group Multicyde that was signed to Warner Music Group and had three number 1 hits in Norway between 1999 and 2002. While in Multicyde, she performed in musical theater shows like Cabaret, Chicago, and West Side Story.

== Songwriting ==
After Multicyde, Silya began working with the Murlyn Music production house in Stockholm as a songwriter. Silya wrote the singles "Kiss Your Mama!" recorded by Australian artist Vanessa Amorosi and "Masterplan" recorded by Swiss artist Stefanie Heinzmann that both went gold in their respective countries. She also wrote the songs "Sneakernight" and "Last Night" on Vanessa Hudgens' album Identified. Most recently, Silya's song "Rock With You" was recorded by Rachel Crow, who came in fifth place on the U.S. The X Factor. Silya has worked with the likes of Cee Lo Green (Gnarls Barkley), Printz Board (Black Eyed Peas, Macy Gray, Nikka Costa), Lester Mendez (Shakira, Nelly Furtado), J.R. Rotem (Rihanna), and Mark Hill (Craig David, Artful Dodger).

== Solo artist ==
In August 2011 Silya released the solo album Peel Away with New York based record label Eusonia Records.

She started writing and also had a dance pop collaboration with Mark Palgy of VHS or Beta and producer Mark Verbos. They wrote songs that later appeared on the album Unanchored (2014) and Life Resolution Heart (2017) re-recorded with her current band Silya & The Sailors.

She is a featuring artist on Crown City Rockers "Kiss" (2009) and on Raashan Ahmad "These foolish things" feat Count Bass D (2010).

She is also a featuring artist on Soft Touch "Swim in the night"(2014).

Silya was a semi-finalist in Melodi Grand Prix 2012 with a song called "Euphoria". Fellow semi-finalist Rikke Normann performed Silya's song "Shapeshifter."

In 2013 she won the TV singing competition called Stjernekamp in Norway and moved back after 8 years in New York City. 2013 was the year she started the band Silya & The Sailors and started touring and recording under that name. In 2019 they released the EP Quantum Bounce.
