= Sneakernight =

Single by Vanessa Hudgens

from the album Identified
- Released: May 27, 2008
- Recorded: 2007
- Genre: Dance
- Length: 2:59
- Label: Hollywood
- Songwriters: J. R. Rotem; Silya Nymoen; L. Solf
- Producer: J. R. Rotem

Vanessa Hudgens singles chronology
"Everyday" (2007)	"Sneakernight" (2008)	"Right Here, Right Now" (2008)

"Sneakernight" is a song recorded by the American singer Vanessa Hudgens. Produced by J. R. Rotem, it was released on digital platforms on May 27, 2008. The song and its accompanying music video were used for an Ecko Unlimited commercial. While the song was originally released to mixed reviews, several viral trends in the years since have prompted resurgences.

== Release and commercial performance ==
"Sneakernight" was released on all digital platforms on May 27, 2008.

The song performed relatively poorly upon release, peaking at 88 on the US Billboard Hot 100. In the years since, however, the song has experienced several viral resurgences across social media, including in 2020, where the song was rediscovered and went viral on TikTok.

== Critical reception ==
Critical reviews of the single were mixed to negative. Maria Dinoia of Common Sense Media stated that, "Parents need to know that unlike this High School Musical star's other songs that tend to be about boys and high school relationships, this one is an innocuous song about going dancing. The tame video shows Hudgens putting on her sneakers, heading to the club, and yes, dancing." Ryan Dombal of Blender said: "And it all seems innocent enough — but that "basically" makes us think there may be more to these sneakernights than mere dancing. The innuendo is there for those who want to hear it ("Put your sneakers on / Let's go all night long!"). Teens will dance (and giggle), parents will overpay for the concert and all will be right with the teen pop universe."

== Music video ==
The video begins with Hudgens going to a house party with a group of friends, all wearing glowing neon sneakers (Eckō Unltd. shoes). Hudgens calls her friends on her cell phone, trying to pick out a pair of sneakers. After she arrives at the party, a guy begins staring at her. She is blocked, however, by another guy who tries to impress her by showing her some dance moves.

The music video premiered on Disney.com on June 13, 2008, and on MTV's TRL on July 1, 2008. The video was directed by R. Malcolm Jones.

== Charts ==
=== Weekly charts ===
Weekly chart performance for "Sneakernight"
Chart (2008–2009)	Peak position
Australia (ARIA)	94
Canada Hot 100 (Billboard)	95
El Salvador (EFE)	1
Germany (GfK)	98
Slovakia Airplay (ČNS IFPI)	66
UK Singles (OCC)	164
US Billboard Hot 100	88
US Dance Club Songs (Billboard)	8

== Certifications ==
Certifications for "Sneakernight"
Region	Certification	Certified units/sales
United States (RIAA)	Gold	500,000^{‡}
^{‡} Sales+streaming figures based on certification alone.

== Credits and personnel ==
Credits are adapted from the liner notes of Identified.

- Vocals – Vanessa Hudgens
- Songwriting – J. R. Rotem, S. Nymoen, L. Solf
- Production – J. R. Rotem

== Formats and track listings ==
Digital download

1. "Sneakernight"

Europe download bundle

1. "Sneakernight"
2. "Sneakernight" (Mr. Mig Retrogroove Edit)
3. "Sneakernight" (Albert Castillo Radio Mix)

Sneakernight the Remixes EP

1. "Sneakernight" (Albert Castillo Club Mix)
2. "Sneakernight" (Albert Castillo Radio Mix)
3. "Sneakernight" (Mr. Mig Dub Remix)
4. "Sneakernight" (Mr. Mig Retrogroove Edit)
5. "Sneakernight" (Mr. Mig Retrogroove Extended)
6. "Sneakernight" (Mr. Mig Rhythm Tribal Extended)
7. "Sneakernight" (Mr. Mig Rhythm Tribal Radio)
