= High School Musical: The Concert =

2006–07 concert tour

- Promotional tour by Vanessa Hudgens, Ashley Tisdale, Lucas Grabeel, Corbin Bleu, Monique Coleman and Drew Seeley
- Location: North America • South America
- Associated album: High School Musical; V; Headstrong; Another Side
- Start date: November 29, 2006
- End date: May 30, 2007
- Legs: 2
- No. of shows: 41 in North America; 10 in Latin America; 51 total
- Box office: US$33.3 million

High School Musical: The Concert was a concert tour performed by members of the cast of the popular television film series, High School Musical, sponsored by AEG Live and presented by Buena Vista Concerts. The concert toured cities in the United States, Canada, Mexico and South America. High School Musical: The Concert expanded the Disney Channel franchise that had previously produced a triple-platinum selling soundtrack and had planned a movie sequel. (Disney had recently scored a success with another concert based on a TV musical by The Cheetah Girls, who had a sold-out tour in 88 cities)

The films' original cast members Vanessa Hudgens, Ashley Tisdale, Lucas Grabeel, Corbin Bleu and Monique Coleman took part in the tour, except for Zac Efron, who had a previous engagement filming Hairspray and was replaced by Drew Seeley, who was Efron's singing voice in the first film.

The tour also served to promote the debut album of three members: V by Vanessa Hudgens, Headstrong by Ashley Tisdale and Another Side by Corbin Bleu.

== Development ==
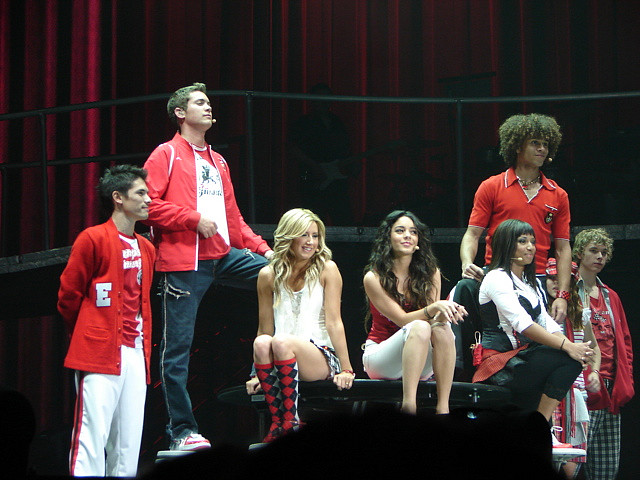
HSM cast during the show in Stockton

The concert, which featured songs from the film, also included cast members Vanessa Hudgens, Ashley Tisdale, Lucas Grabeel, Corbin Bleu and Monique Coleman. Zac Efron was the only original cast member absent from the tour due to his commitment with the filming of the 2007 film adaptation of the Broadway musical Hairspray, which conflicted with the tour. Instead, Drew Seeley, Efron's singing voice in the first film and co-writer of "Get'cha Head in the Game", joined the tour in Efron's place. Jordan Pruitt joined the tour as the opening act. Kenny Ortega, the film's director and choreographer, became the show's touring producer, creative director and director. On the night of the last concert, as seen on YouTube, the cast introduced him before singing the final chorus of "We're All in This Together". The concert typically ran two and a half hours (150 minutes) including the opening act and intermission.

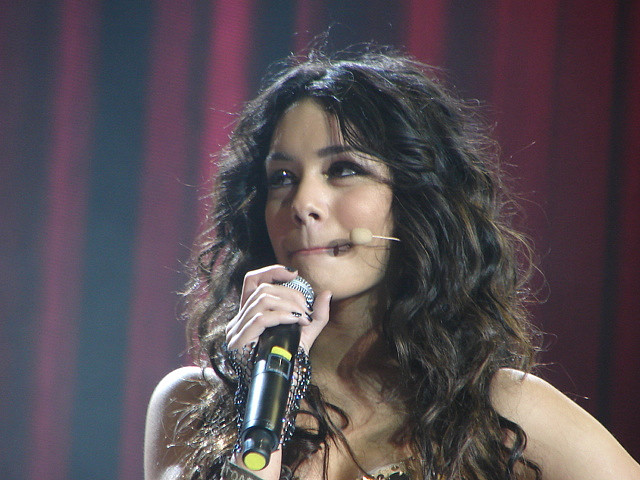
Hudgens during the HSM concert in Stockton

The cast toured five countries in Latin America: Argentina, Chile, Brazil, Venezuela and Mexico. Each of the singers had two microphones during the performances: a headset microphone with a nude-colored pad on the tip, and a handheld microphone. Erin Lareau designed the costumes for the concert tour. "Dance with Me" (from The Cheetah Girls 2, also directed by Kenny Ortega with choreography by Ortega and Charles Klapow) included an extended guitar solo which allowed Monique Coleman to feature in an extended tango number with both backup dancers Jared Murillo and Seeley. Murillo also choreographed "Dance with Me".

== Telecasts and recordings ==
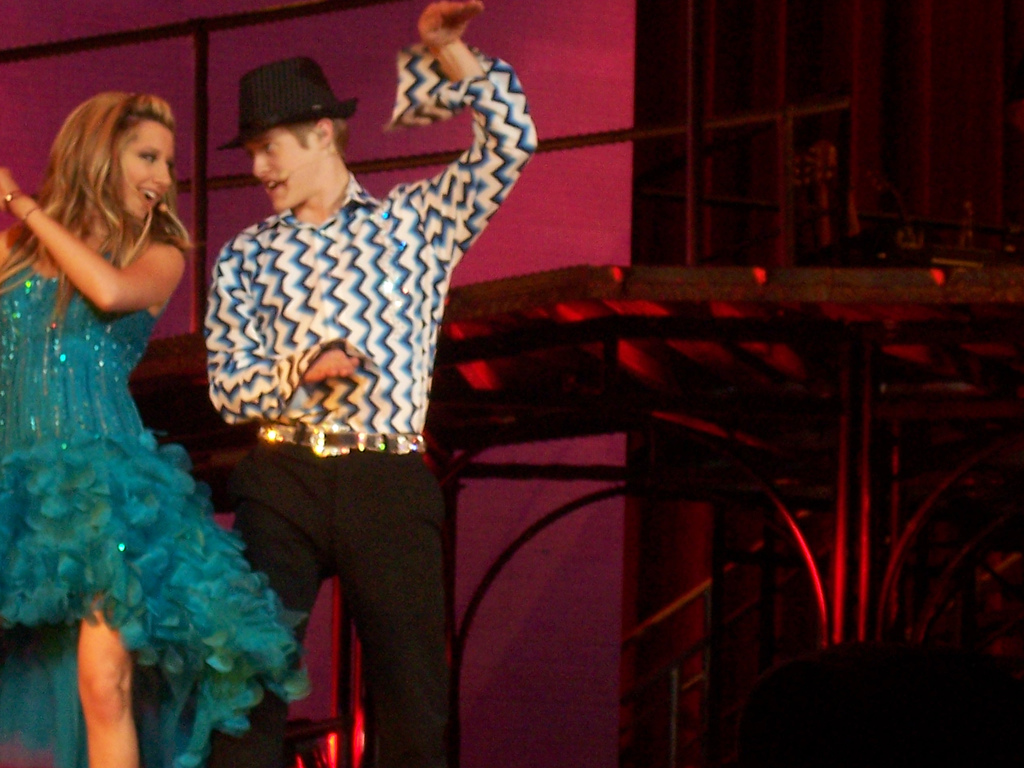
Tisdale and Grabeel performing "Bop to the Top" during the show in Rochester

On May 26, 2007, Disney Channel Latin America showed the concert made in Buenos Aires in Argentina. This performance aired none of Ashley Tisdale's songs, and Vanessa Hudgens only sang "Come Back To Me". On June 9, 2007, Canal 13 showed the concert performed in Santiago, Chile, airing all the solo performances. On June 10, 2007, the concert filmed in Mexico City, Mexico aired on Disney Channel Latin America. On June 17, 2007, the show filmed in São Paulo, Brazil, aired on Disney Channel Latin America. An edit of the São Paulo concert also aired on Record TV on June 24, 2007.

The concert CD/DVD came from a performance in Houston, Texas on December 18, 2006 at the Toyota Center. The album and video was released on June 26, 2007. While the CD and DVD were recorded by Disney at the same show, the two feature slightly alternate edits. The live version of "Start of Something New" recorded at the Houston concert appeared in the Radio Disney Jams, Vol. 9 CD.

== Opening acts ==
- Jordan Pruitt (all tour dates)

== Set list ==
=== Jordan Pruitt opening setlist ===
1. "Jump to the Rhythm"
2. "Teenager"
3. "Outside Looking In"
4. "Miss Popularity"
5. "We Are Family"

=== Main setlist ===
1. "Introduction" (contains excerpts of "Start of Something New", "Stick to the Status Quo", and "We're All in This Together")
2. "Start of Something New"
3. "Stick to the Status Quo"
4. "I Can't Take My Eyes Off You"
5. "When There Was Me and You"
6. "Headstrong" (Ashley Tisdale solo)
7. "We'll Be Together" (Ashley Tisdale solo)
8. "He Said She Said" (Ashley Tisdale solo)
9. "Get'cha Head in the Game"
10. "Dance With Me" (Drew Seeley solo)
11. "Push it to the Limit" (Corbin Bleu solo)
12. "Marchin'" (Corbin Bleu solo)
13. "What I've Been Looking For" (Reprise)
14. "What I've Been Looking For"
15. "Let's Dance" (Vanessa Hudgens solo)
16. "Say OK" (Vanessa Hudgens solo)
17. "Come Back To Me" (Vanessa Hudgens solo)
18. "Bop to the Top"
19. "Breaking Free"

Encore

20. "We're All in This Together"

== Shows ==
List of concerts, showing date, city, country, venue, tickets sold, number of available tickets and amount of gross revenue
Date	City	Country	Venue	Attendance	Revenue
North America
November 29, 2006	San Diego	United States	iPayOne Center	9,736 / 9,803	$525,518
December 1, 2006	San Jose	United States	HP Pavilion	12,408 / 13,103	$647,409
December 3, 2006	Glendale	United States	Jobing.com Arena	11,328 / 12,325	$604,891
December 5, 2006	Sacramento	United States	ARCO Arena	8,407 / 10,225	$448,163
December 6, 2006	Stockton	United States	Stockton Arena	7,711 / 9,054	$414,484
December 8, 2006	Bakersfield	United States	Rabobank Arena	7,428 / 7,829	$403,528
December 10, 2006	Portland	United States	Rose Garden Arena	7,880 / 13,195	$423,779
December 11, 2006	Seattle	United States	KeyArena	8,116 / 11,534	$432,505
December 16, 2006	Bossier City	United States	CenturyTel Center	6,149 / 9,007	$332,158
December 17, 2006	Dallas	United States	American Airlines Center	12,590 / 14,012	$657,699
December 18, 2006	Houston	United States	Toyota Center	12,416 / 12,811	$638,822
December 20, 2006	Tampa	United States	St. Pete Times Forum	13,091 / 14,190	$677,327
December 21, 2006	Orlando	United States	Amway Arena	10,802 / 11,516	$575,982
December 22, 2006	Columbia	United States	Colonial Center	9,149 / 12,096	$477,117
December 23, 2006	Charlotte	United States	Charlotte Bobcats Arena	10,937 / 11,101	$560,025
December 27, 2006	Greensboro	United States	Greensboro Coliseum	10,532 / 14,595	$545,802
December 28, 2006	Washington, D.C.	United States	Verizon Center	14,278 / 14,546	$731,209
December 29, 2006	Uniondale	United States	Nassau Coliseum	13,290 / 14,000	$1,444,431
December 30, 2006	Manchester	United States	Verizon Wireless Arena	8,956 / 9,283	$502,429
January 2, 2007	Toronto	Canada	Air Canada Centre	15,041 / 15,841	$701,317
January 3, 2007	Rochester	United States	Blue Cross Arena	10,507 / 10,863	$548,724
January 4, 2007	Hartford	United States	Hartford Civic Center	12,673 / 12,824	$663,195
January 6, 2007	Pittsburgh	United States	Mellon Arena	12,570 / 13,100	$616,083
January 7, 2007	Albany	United States	Times Union Center	12,028 / 12,301	$622,798
January 8, 2007	East Rutherford	United States	Continental Airlines Arena	15,660 / 15,723	$865,997
January 9, 2007	Worcester	United States	DCU Center	10,738 / 11,016	$569,467
January 11, 2007	Philadelphia	United States	Wachovia Spectrum	12,545 / 13,210	$653,193
January 12, 2007	Charlottesville	United States	John Paul Jones Arena	10,053 / 12,162	$527,621
January 13, 2007	Cincinnati	United States	U.S. Bank Arena	11,445 / 11,633	$614,895
January 14, 2007	Cleveland	United States	Wolstein Center	10,350 / 10,569	$564,911
January 16, 2007	Auburn Hills	United States	The Palace of Auburn Hills	15,043 / 15,385	$775,157
January 17, 2007	Indianapolis	United States	Conseco Fieldhouse	11,590 / 13,159	$600,484
January 18, 2007	Columbus	United States	Schottenstein Center	13,286 / 13,649	$683,026
January 19, 2007	Rosemont	United States	Allstate Arena	13,442 / 13,442	$696,237
January 21, 2007	Milwaukee	United States	Bradley Center	13,997 / 14,499	$706,182
January 22, 2007	St. Louis	United States	Scottrade Center	15,206 / 15,487	$772,296
January 23, 2007	Kansas City	United States	Kemper Arena	13,768 / 14,039	$711,456
January 26, 2007	Anaheim	United States	Honda Center	12,019 / 12,367	$651,591
January 27, 2007	Fresno	United States	Selland Arena	6,776 / 7,414	$395,140
January 28, 2007	Las Vegas	United States	Thomas & Mack Center	12,374 / 12,374	$637,669
January 29, 2007	Los Angeles	United States	Staples Center	13,804 / 13,910	$717,482
Latin America
May 15, 2007	Buenos Aires	Argentina	River Plate Stadium	—	—
May 16, 2007	Buenos Aires	Argentina	River Plate Stadium	—	—
May 18, 2007	Santiago	Chile	Estadio Nacional	16,570 / 25,000	$891,140
May 20, 2007	São Paulo	Brazil	Estádio do Morumbi	37,406 / 41,205	$2,186,358
May 22, 2007	Caracas	Venezuela	Estadio Universitario de Caracas	8,918 / 14,809	$507,376
May 24, 2007	Monterrey	Mexico	Auditorio Coca-Cola	16,192 / 18,396	$1,287,564
May 25, 2007	Monterrey	Mexico	Auditorio Coca-Cola	16,192 / 18,396	$1,287,564
May 27, 2007	Mexico City	Mexico	Foro Sol	35,139 / 51,215	$1,981,077
May 29, 2007	Guadalajara	Mexico	Arena VFG	19,120 / 19,440	$1,081,651
May 30, 2007	Guadalajara	Mexico	Arena VFG	19,120 / 19,440	$1,081,651
Total				616,432 / 692,250 (89%)	$33,273,365

== Other media ==
=== Live album ===
High School Musical: The Concert

Live album by High School Musical
- Released: June 26, 2007
- Recorded: December 18, 2006; Houston, Toyota Center
- Genre: Pop
- Length: 51:44
- Label: Walt Disney

Professional ratings
Review scores
Source	Rating
Amazon	link

CD (CD / DVD released on May 1, 2007)

- Disc 1 [CD]
1. "Start of Something New" – Drew & Vanessa ft. Ashley, Lucas, Corbin, & Monique
2. "Stick to the Status Quo" – Ashley, Lucas, & Cast
3. "I Can't Take My Eyes Off Of You" – Drew, Vanessa, Ashley, Lucas, Corbin, & Monique
4. "When There Was Me And You" – Vanessa
5. "Get'cha Head In The Game" – Drew & Corbin (with backup dancers)
6. "What I've Been Looking For" – Drew & Vanessa
7. "What I've Been Looking For (Encore)" – Ashley & Lucas
8. "Bop To The Top" – Ashley & Lucas
9. "Breaking Free" – Drew & Vanessa
10. "We're All in This Together (Encore)" – Drew, Vanessa, Ashley, Lucas, Monique, Corbin, & Cast

Bonus tracks
No.	Title	Recording artist(s)	Length
11.	"Push It To The Limit"	Corbin Bleu	3:29
12.	"Say OK"	Vanessa Hudgens	3:32
13.	"Dance With Me"	Drew Seeley	3:58
14.	"We'll Be Together"	Ashley Tisdale	3:46

- Disc 2 [DVD]
1. Five performances of High School Musical hits ("Start of Something New", "Get'cha Head in the Game", "Bop To The Top", "Breaking Free", "We're All in This Together")
2. Exclusive cast interviews (Concert Highlights DVD)
3. Preview for High School Musical: The Concert Extreme Access Pass

=== Video album ===
1. The Start Of Something New – Drew, Vanessa, Ashley, Lucas, Monique, & Corbin
2. Stick To The Status Quo – Drew, Vanessa, Ashley, Lucas, & Cast
3. I Can't Take My Eyes Off Of You – Drew, Vanessa, Ashley, Lucas, Monique, & Corbin
4. When There Was Me And You – Vanessa
5. We'll Be Together – Ashley
6. Get'cha Head in the Game – Drew & Corbin (with backup dancers)
7. Push It To the Limit – Corbin Bleu
8. Marchin' – Corbin
9. What I've Been Looking For (Version A) – Drew & Vanessa
10. What I've Been Looking For (Version B) – Ashley & Lucas
11. Say OK – Vanessa
12. Bop To The Top – Ashley & Lucas
13. Breakin' Free – Drew & Vanessa
14. We're All in This Together (Encore) – Drew, Vanessa, Ashley, Lucas, Monique, Corbin, & Cast

Bonus tracks

1. Jordan Pruitt's show-opening act ("Jump to the Rhythm", "Teenager", "Outside Looking In", "Miss Popularity")
2. High School Musical: On the Road
3. U Direct ("Start of Something New", "Get'cha Head in the Game", "Bop To The Top", "Breaking Free", "We're All in This Together")
4. High School Musical 2 trailer

=== Chart positions ===
==== Weekly charts ====
Chart (2007)	Peak position
Mexican Albums (AMPROFON)	10
Spanish Albums (PROMUSICAE)	40

==== Year-end charts ====
Chart (2007)	Position
Mexican Albums (AMPROFON)	83

== See also ==
- High School Musical
- High School Musical 2
- High School Musical 3: Senior Year
- High School Musical: El desafio (Argentina)
