= V (Vanessa Hudgens album) =

Studio album by Vanessa Hudgens
- Released: September 26, 2006
- Recorded: 2005–2006
- Genres: Pop; R&B
- Length: 38:28
- Label: Hollywood
- Producers: Matthew Gerrard; Brian Reeves; Antonina Armato; Kent Larsson; David Norland; Leah Haywood; Tim James; Daniel James; Jay Jay; Wizard of Oz; Arnthor Birgisson; AJ Junior; Johnny Veira

Vanessa Hudgens chronology
V (2006)	Identified (2008)

Singles from V
- 1. "Come Back to Me" Released: September 12, 2006; 2. "Say OK" Released: March 27, 2007

V is the debut studio album by American singer Vanessa Hudgens, first released on September 26, 2006, via Hollywood Records. The album has spawned two singles, lead "Come Back to Me" and follow-up "Say OK." Hudgens supported the album with serving as an opening act for The Cheetah Girls' The Party's Just Begun Tour and also on the High School Musical: The Concert tour.

Upon release, V received generally positive reviews, with critics praising its polished pop and R&B production and teen-friendly themes, though some found the songs generic and the vocals inconsistent. Commercially, it debuted at number 24 on the US Billboard 200, was later certified gold in the US, and had sold about 570,000 copies by April 2008. The album was voted as the seventh best album of 2007 by the readers of Billboard.

== Writing and development ==
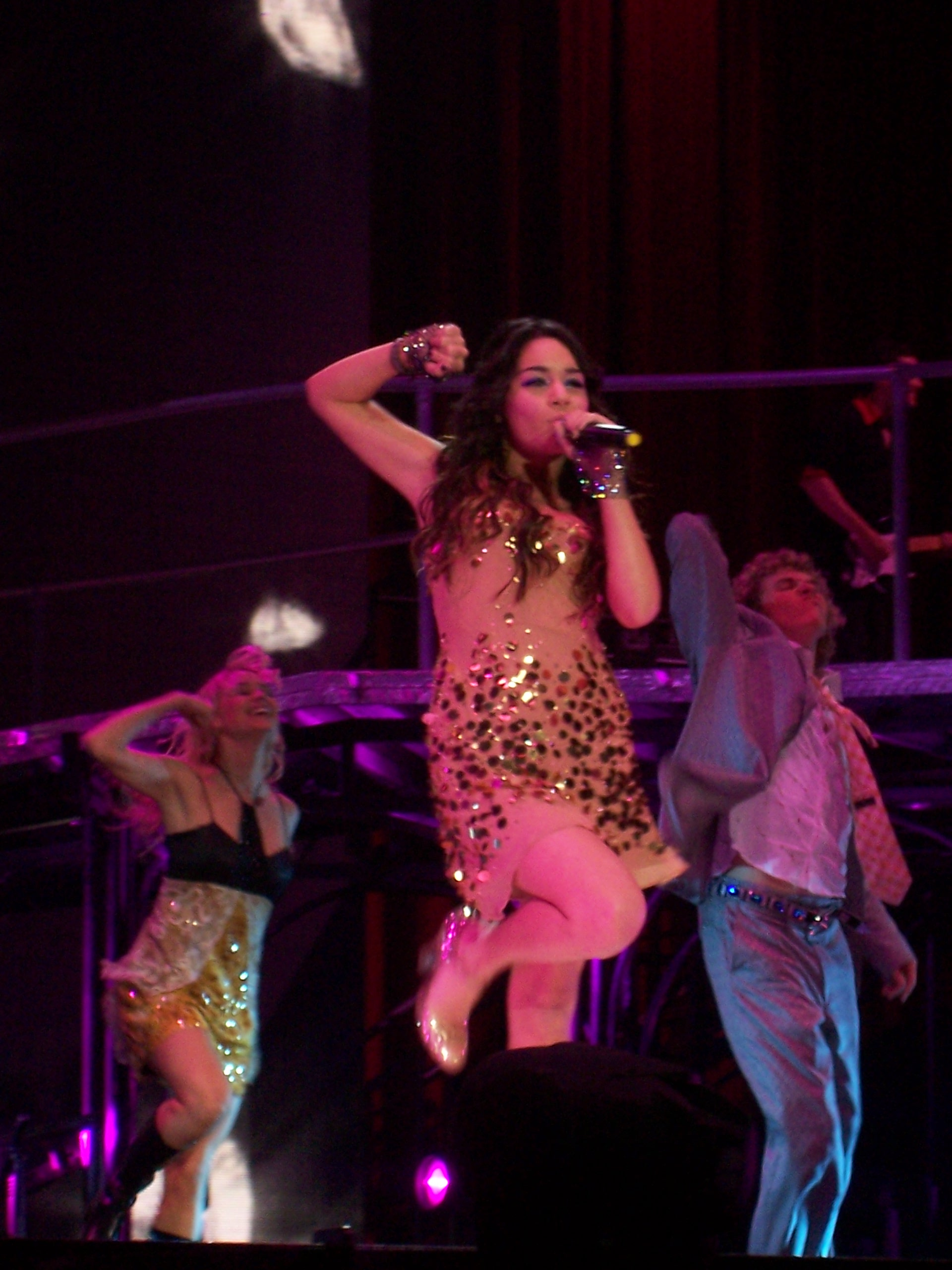
Hudgens performing "Come Back to Me" during High School Musical: The Concert

After participating in High School Musical, Hollywood Records made a proposal for Vanessa to start a solo music career. The album was produced in two months as the record company insisted that the album was to be recorded and produced quickly.

"I did it my way. My single "Come Back to Me" is kind of pop and R&B, but the rest of the album brings a bit of pop rock, electronic music, and some ballads. It is a mixture of everything," said Vanessa, who at first thought of making a purely dance album.

Hudgens stated the title of the album stands for Vanessa, but also for variety, because the album is a mix of genres and styles.

She also recorded three covers. "Whatever Will Be," which was originally released by Tammin Sursok the year before, "Afraid," which was initially recorded by Melissa Schuman and intended for her unreleased album Stereotyped, and "Let Go," which was originally sung by Raffish and intended for Britney Spears' fourth album In the Zone.

== Release ==
=== Singles ===
"Come Back to Me" was released as V's lead single on September 12, 2006. It peaked at number 55 on the Billboard Hot 100, becoming Hudgens's highest-charting single as a solo artist. Internationally, the track was a moderate commercial success, peaking at number 12 in France and peaking at top 40 in Australia as well as peaking at number 6 in New Zealand. The song received generally positive reviews from critics. The accompanying music video featured Hudgens dancing and socializing with her friends, including her sister, Stella Hudgens, and Alexa Nikolas.

"Say OK" was released as the second single from album on January 12, 2007, and was sent to US mainstream radio two months later, on March 27, 2007. The track was comparatively less commercially successful than the album's previous single, peaking at number 61 on the Billboard Hot 100. There are two versions of music video, the first version takes place on the High School Musical: The Concert Tour in Seattle, Washington. While the second officially released version, featuring Zac Efron, has gathered over 180 million views on YouTube.

"Let's Dance" was released as a promo single only in the United States. The song was released digitally on September 25, 2007. The live version of the song recorded during the High School Musical tour was used for promotion. The song was also used on Dancing with the Stars on US network ABC. The song failed to enter the Billboard Hot 100.

=== Promotion ===
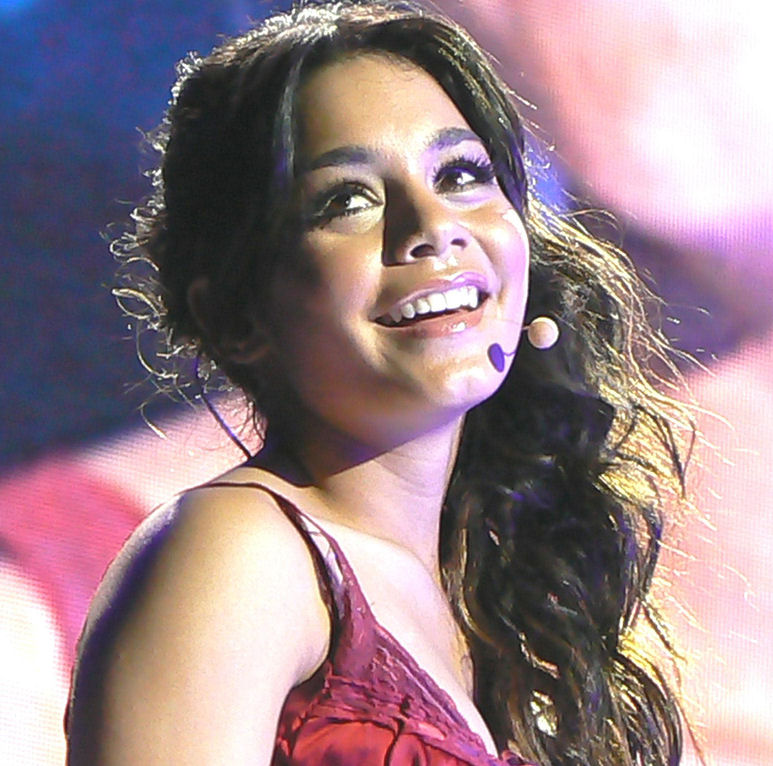
Hudgens during "High School Musical: The Concert"

There were different editions issued, each containing thirteen or fourteen tracks with varying bonus tracks. A twelve-track version was then released internationally on November 28, 2006. The CD was then released on January 17, 2007, in Japan (sixteen tracks) and on March 17, 2007, in Australia (twelve tracks).

The album was re-released again in a limited Deluxe edition format, released in Japan, Malaysia, and Taiwan. The song "Let's Dance" was included in a Wii game, called We Cheer 2.

Hudgens promoted the album when opening for the Cheetah Girls during their The Party's Just Begun Tour. She also promoted her album on the High School Musical: The Concert tour, regularly singing "Say OK." Hudgens performed "Come Back to Me", "Say OK" and "Let's Dance" in the concert. She also performed various songs off the album on her Identified Summer Tour which also promoted her second studio album Identified.

== Critical reception ==
Professional ratings
Review scores
Source	Rating
AllMusic	3/5 stars
Digital Spy	3.5/5 stars
MSN Music	2.5/5 stars
Rolling Stone	2.5/5 stars
USA Today	3/4 stars

Upon its release, V received generally positive reviews from most music critics. Mentioned in Identified review, Heather Phares praised the album "was her first step toward a less overtly Disney-affiliated career: released by the studio's Hollywood label, it used Christina Aguilera's soulful pop as a template; even if its songs were a bit faceless, they had surprisingly sophisticated production values." She noted that Hudgens "sings about love, dancing, and hanging with her girls" and repeated again in Identified, "the production outclasses the songs and the singing."

Nate Cavalieri of Rhapsody Music said: "This collection of pop and sugary R&B keeps the messages squeaky clean, even with hints that she is willing to break your shyness. The singles are well built and the best are "Come Back to Me" dancing to "Let's Dance" and a dedication surprisingly emotive long-distance, "Afraid."

Common Sense Media's Tony Whittum said: "The first album Hudgens is well positioned to win the approval of the teen market. Her 12 relatively simple, romantic and sweet pop songs about boys, hanging out with friends, dancing, female power, and tribulations of a very young life are delivered with the latest plain, recycled, computer programmed beats and hip-hop." He further added, "Hudgens is strong, stable and comfortable in the medium, as when she is singing a dance song "Let's Dance" and pop rock "Never Underestimate a Girl." Otherwise, your voice can range from the diminutive and shy the strident edge. With her voice and her musical talent mature, it would be nice to see Hudgens take more risks and produce something more original. Then, as their audience matures, they will not leave it behind."

The album was nominated as #7 on "Album of the Year" by Billboard Readers' Choice.

== Commercial performance ==
V debuted on the US Billboard 200 in early October 2006 at number twenty-four on the chart, with 34,000 copies sold in its first week. The album dropped off the Billboard 200 after thirty-two weeks on the chart. On February 27, 2007, the album was certified gold in the US for shipments to retailers of 500,000 copies. The album was certified platinum in Argentina for sales of 8,000 copies, under DVD category. As of April 2008, the album has sold 570,000 copies in the US.

== Track listing ==
V track listing
No.	Title	Writer(s)	Producer(s)	Length
1.	"Come Back to Me"	Antonina Armato; Tim James; Peter Beckett; J.C. Crowley	Armato; James	2:47
2.	"Let Go"	Andrew Bojanic; Elizabeth Hooper; Ivy Levan	Wizards of Oz	2:48
3.	"Say OK"	Arnthor Birgisson; Savan Kotecha	Arnthor	3:41
4.	"Never Underestimate a Girl"	Matthew Gerrard; Robbie Nevil	Gerrard; Nevil	3:01
5.	"Let's Dance"	Gerrard; Jonas Jeberg; Bridget Benenate	Gerrard; Jay Jay	2:52
6.	"Drive"	Leah Haywood; David Norland	Norland; Daniel James; Haywood	3:25
7.	"Afraid"	D. James; Haywood; Bradley Spalter	D. James; Haywood	3:17
8.	"Promise"	D. James; Haywood; Shelly Peiken	D. James; Haywood	3:16
9.	"Whatever Will Be"	Kotecha; Carl Falk; Jake Schulze	Kent Larsson; AJ Junior	3:47
10.	"Rather Be with You"	Bojanic; Hooper; Levan	Wizards of Oz	3:33
11.	"Psychic"	Johnny Vieira	Vieira	3:01
12.	"Lose Your Love"	Vieira	Vieira	3:01
Total length:				38:28

V – Asian deluxe edition (bonus tracks)
No.	Title	Writer(s)	Producer(s)	Length
13.	"Too Emotional"	Armato; T. James; Scappa	Armato; T. James	2:50
14.	"Drip Drop"	Alex Cantrall	Cantrall	3:37
15.	"Don't Talk"	Armato; T. James; Scappa	Armato; T. James	2:37
16.	"Make You Mine"	Gerrard; Kara DioGuardi	Gerrard	3:38
17.	"Come Back to Me" (Chris Cox Remix Radio Mix)	Armato; T. James	Armato; T. James; Beckett; Crowley	4:23
18.	"Come Back to Me" (Chris Cox Remix Club Mix)	Armato; T. James	Armato; T. James; Beckett; Crowley	9:26
Total length:				65:04

V – Asian deluxe edition (bonus DVD)
No.	Title	Length
1.	"Come Back to Me" (music video)	2:49
2.	"Say OK" (Music video)	3:39
3.	"Come Back to Me" (music video; live version)	2:56
4.	"Say OK" (Music video; live version)	3:28
5.	"Vanessa Hudgens Interview"	3:08
Total length:		16:00

=== Notes ===
- The tracks "Let Go," "Afraid" and "Whatever Will Be" are covers of songs originally performed by Raffish, Melissa Schuman, and Tammin Sursok respectively.
- Due to the large amount of editions released for this album that contain slight differences from each other throughout releases, only the Asian deluxe edition has been listed aside from the standard edition, due to the release encompassing all of the bonus tracks and included videos released from all available editions.
- In total, V has 8 editions, the standard edition, the digital store edition with a bonus video, the Best Buy edition, the Target edition, the Walmart limited edition with a bonus download for "Drip Drop," the international digital special edition, the Japan standard edition, and the Asian deluxe edition.

== Personnel ==
- Vocals: Vanessa Hudgens
- Background vocals: Vanessa Hudgens, Ulrika Lundkvist, Bridget Benenate, Char Licera, Anna Nordell, Jeanette Olsson, Keely Pressly, Dionyza Sutton, Leah Haywood
- Keyboard: Matthew Gerrard, Leah Haywood
- Baixo: Jack Daley
- Guitar: Tyrone Johnson, Scott Jacoby, Daniel James, Tim Pierce, Matthew Gerrard, Darren Elliott
- Piano: Mattias Bylund
- Violino: Martin Bylund
- Viola: Irene Bylund
- Drums: Bradley Polan, Jay Jay
- String arrangement – Nicky Scappa, Read
- Strings: Read
- Executive producers: Jon Lind, Mio Vukovic & Johnny Vieira.
- Vocal production: Antonina Armato, Tim James, Wizard of Oz, Arnthor, Matthew Gerrard, Jay Jay, David Norland, Leah Haywood, Daniel James, Kent Larsson, AJ Junior & Johnny Vieira.
- Additional production: Leah Haywood & Daniel James (On tracks 11 and 12)
- Vocal arrangement: David Norland, Leah Haywood & Daniel James
- Engineer: Nigel Lundemo, Brian Reeves, Wizard of Oz, Jake Davies & Ben Eggehorn
- Coordenação: Jon Lind & Mio Vukovic
- Artistic direction and design: Enny Joo
- Mixed: Serban Ghenea
- Photography: Andrew McPherson

== Charts ==
=== Weekly charts ===
Weekly chart performance for V
Chart (2006–2007)	Peak position
Argentine Albums (CAPIF)	17
Canadian Albums (Nielsen SoundScan)	91
French Albums (SNEP)	59
Irish Albums (IRMA)	27
Italian Albums (FIMI)	42
Japanese Albums (Oricon)	43
New Zealand Albums (RMNZ)	35
Scottish Albums (Official Charts)	80
UK Albums (Official Charts)	86
US Billboard 200	24

=== Year-end charts ===
Year-end chart performance for V
Chart (2007)	Position
US Billboard 200	153

== Certifications and sales ==
Certifications and sales for V
Region	Certification	Certified units/sales
Argentina (CAPIF)	Platinum	8,000^{^}
Brazil	—	10,000 (Note: As of May 2007.)
United States (RIAA)	Gold	570,000 (Note: As of April 2008.)
^{^} Shipments figures based on certification alone.

== Release history ==
Release history and formats for V
Region	Date	Label
United States	September 26, 2006	Hollywood
Brazil	October 30, 2006	Universal Music
Italy	December 1, 2006	EMI
United Kingdom	December 4, 2006	Angel
Japan	January 17, 2007	Avex Music Creative
Germany	February 9, 2007	EMI
Asia (deluxe)	August 22, 2007	EMI, Avex Music Creative
