= Identified =

- Standard edition cover; Japanese edition has the same cover as the "Sneakernight" single

Studio album by Vanessa Hudgens
- Released: June 24, 2008
- Recorded: 2007–2008
- Length: 37:44
- Label: Hollywood
- Producers: Scott Jacoby; Dr. Luke; Max Martin; Benny Blanco; Antonina Armato; Tim James; J. R. Rotem; Christopher Rojas; Emanuel Kiriakou; The Messengers

Vanessa Hudgens chronology
V (2006)	Identified (2008)

Singles from Identified
- 1. "Sneakernight" Released: May 27, 2008

Identified is the second studio album by American singer and actress Vanessa Hudgens, released on June 24, 2008 in Japan. The album received generally positive reviews from music critics. Hudgens embarked on her first concert tour, Identified Summer Tour between August and September 2008 in support of the album.

== Release ==
=== Singles ===
"Sneakernight" was released as the first and only single from the album. The track, produced by J.R. Rotem, was released on May 27, 2008 in the United States and February 8, 2009 in Europe. The song peaked at number 88 on the Billboard Hot 100. The music video was filmed by R. Malcolm Jones and premiered on June 13, 2008.

== Critical reception ==
Professional ratings
Review scores
Source	Rating
AllMusic	3.5/5 stars
Blender	3/5 stars
Robert Christgau	(dud)
Digital Spy	2/5 stars
Entertainment Weekly	C+
Rolling Stone	3/5 stars
USA Today	2/4 stars

Identified has received generally favorable reviews, having a 63 out of 100 score based on 7 reviews. Billboard said that the album "panders to the preteen demo with stop-start pop that ranges from pleasant (the title track) to dull ("Amazed") to off-putting ("Hook It Up"). But for little girls, this is one nonstop sing-along." The New York Times said that "a handful of songs like this would have sufficed to help mature her image, and yet "Identified" is far more interesting and unexpected."

Blender rated it three stars out of five, and claimed that her "voice was made to rip, and when she lets go just a little, the coyness turns sultry—proof that she might just have a life after high school." Variety said that Identified "shows that the High School Musical veteran is definitely ready to graduate. The better parts of the album find her reaching for a more mature sound, but she hedges her bets with large portions of treacly teen-pop...The weakest link in most of the songs is Hudgens' thin, piping voice."

== Track listing ==
No.	Title	Writer(s)	Producer(s)	Length
1.	"Last Night"	Silya Nymoen, Scott Jacoby	Jacoby	3:10
2.	"Identified"	Lukasz Gottwald, Cathy Dennis, Max Martin	Dr. Luke, Max Martin	3:21
3.	"First Bad Habit"	Gottwald, Dennis	Dr. Luke	3:02
4.	"Hook It Up"	Antonina Armato, Tim James, Devrim Karaoglu	Armato, James	2:52
5.	"Don't Ask Why"	Gottwald, Dennis, Beau Dozier	Dr. Luke	3:10
6.	"Sneakernight"	Silya Nymoen, J.R. Rotem	J.R. Rotem	2:59
7.	"Amazed" (featuring Lil Mama)	Gottwald, Dennis, Benjamin Levin, Niatia Kirkland	Dr. Luke, Benny Blanco	2:59
8.	"Don't Leave"	Armato, James, Jesse McCartney	Armato, James	3:08
9.	"Paper Cut"	Johnny Vieira	Vieira	2:48
10.	"Party on the Moon"	Chris Rojas, Nasri Atweh, Adam Messinger	Rojas, The Messengers	3:50
11.	"Did It Ever Cross Your Mind"	Vieira	Vieira	3:10
12.	"Gone with the Wind"	Maimouna Youseff, Kara DioGuardi, Walter Afanasieff, Emanuel Kiriakou, Zukhan Bey, Brandon Howard	Kiriakou	3:28

iTunes Store edition
No.	Title	Writer(s)	Producer(s)	Length
11.	"Gone with the Wind"	Maimouna Youseff, Kara DioGuardi, Walter Afanasieff, Emanuel Kiriakou, Zukhan Bey, Brandon Howard	Kiriakou	3:28
12.	"Did It Ever Cross Your Mind"	Vieira	Vieira	3:10
13.	"Vulnerable"	Nick Scapa, James, John Fasse, Armato	Armato, James	3:11

Japan edition
No.	Title	Writer(s)	Producer(s)	Length
11.	"Did It Ever Cross Your Mind"	Vieira	Vieira	3:10
12.	"Set It Off"	Klas Ahlund, Lukasz "Doctor Luke" Gottwald, Max Martin	L. Gottwald	3:04
13.	"Committed"	Armato, Tim Price	Armato, James	2:35
14.	"Gone with the Wind"	Maimouna Youseff, Kara DioGuardi, Walter Afanasieff, Emanuel Kiriakou, Zukhan Bey, Brandon Howard	Kiriakou	3:28
15.	"Vulnerable"	Nick Scapa, James, John Fasse, Armato	Armato, James	3:11

International edition
No.	Title	Writer(s)	Producer(s)	Length
13.	"Committed"	Armato, Tim Price	Armato, James	2:35
14.	"Vulnerable"	Nick Scapa, James, John Fasse, Armato	Armato, James	3:11
15.	"Set It Off"	Klas Ahlund, Lukasz "Doctor Luke" Gottwald, Max Martin	L. Gottwald	3:04

International iTunes Store and Latin American digital edition bonus tracks
No.	Title	Writer(s)	Producer(s)	Length
16.	"Sneakernight" (Mr. Mig Retrogroove Mix)	Silya Nymoen, J.R. Rotem	J.R. Rotem	6:53
17.	"Sneakernight" (Club Remix)	Silya Nymoen, J.R. Rotem	J.R. Rotem	6:37

== Personnel ==
The following people contributed to Identified

- Vanessa Hudgens – lead vocals
- Lil Mama – featuring vocals
- Vanessa Hudgens, Rock Mafia, Cathy Dennis, Kara DioGuardi, Leah Haywood, Nasri, Tim James, Ashley Valentin, Christopher Rojas, Carlos Alvarez – additional and background vocals
- Lukasz Gottwald – keyboards
- Jack Daley – bass
- Tyrone Johnson, Scott Jacoby – guitar

=== Production ===
- Jonathan "J.R." Rotem, Dr. Luke, Christopher Rojas, Emanuel Kiriakou, Devrim Karaoglu, Daniel James, Scott Jacoby, Antonina Armato, Matt Beckley – executive producers
- Chris Gehringer – mastering
- Nick Banns – mastering assistant
- Jason Recon Coons, Matty Green, Steve Hammons, Scott Jacoby, Emily Wright – engineers
- Jon Lind, Mio Vukovic – A&R
- Miranda Penn Turin – photography

== Chart performance ==
Identified debuted at #23 on the US Billboard 200 with 22,000 copies sold in its first week, 12,000 less than her first album, V.

== Charts ==
=== Weekly charts ===
Weekly chart performance for Identified
Chart (2008–2009)	Peak position
Argentine Albums (CAPIF)	5
Australian Hitseekers Albums (ARIA)	15
Austrian Albums (Ö3 Austria)	35
Canadian Albums (Nielsen SoundScan)	37
Czech Albums (ČNS IFPI)	48
European Top 100 Albums (Billboard)	94
German Albums (Offizielle Top 100)	60
Greek Albums (IFPI)	44
Irish Albums (IRMA)	37
Japanese Albums (Oricon)	85
Japanese Top Albums Sales (Billboard Japan)	74
Scottish Albums (Official Charts)	53
Swiss Albums (Schweizer Hitparade)	74
Taiwanese Albums (Five Music)	19
UK Albums (Official Charts)	46
US Billboard 200	23

=== Monthly charts ===
Monthly chart performance for Identified
Chart (2008)	Peak position
Argentine Albums (CAPIF)	18

== Release history ==
Release history for Identified
Region	Date	Label
Japan	June 24, 2008	Avex Trax
United States	July 1, 2008	Hollywood
Hong Kong	July 18, 2008	Universal Music
Brazil	August 5, 2008	Universal Music
United Kingdom	February 16, 2009	EMI
Finland	February 18, 2009	EMI
Sweden	February 18, 2009	EMI
