= Come Back to Me (Vanessa Hudgens song) =

Single by Vanessa Hudgens

from the album V
- B-side: "Don't Talk"; "Too Emotional"
- Released: September 12, 2006
- Recorded: 2006
- Genre: R&B
- Length: 2:46
- Label: Hollywood
- Songwriters: Antonina Armato; Tim James; Peter Beckett; J.C. Crowley
- Producers: Antonina Armato; Tim James

Vanessa Hudgens singles chronology
"Breaking Free" (2006)	"Come Back to Me" (2006)	"Say OK" (2007)

"Come Back to Me" is the debut single by American actress and singer Vanessa Hudgens. The song was written and produced by Antonina Armato and Tim James. It was released on September 12, 2006, through Hollywood Records as the lead single from Hudgens' debut studio album, V (2006). The song is built around a sample of "Baby Come Back" (1977) by American band Player. Due to the inclusion of the sample, the original song's writers, Peter Beckett and J.C. Crowley, obtained writing credits. Musically, "Come Back to Me" is a R&B song with an urban beat, string instruments and hand claps.

Critical reception of "Come Back to Me" was generally positive; some critics praised the inclusion of the Player sample and named the song one of the album's best tracks. However, it was criticized for holding a manufactured and overproduced sound. It performed moderately in the United States, where it peaked at number 55 on the Billboard Hot 100 and number 18 on the Pop Songs chart. It fared better internationally as it peaked in the top 20 in several countries, including France, Italy, New Zealand and Spain. The accompanying music video was directed by Chris Applebaum and features Hudgens dancing in front of colorful backdrops and hanging out with her friends.

== Background and composition ==
"Come Back to Me" (2006)
A 17-second sample of "Come Back to Me", with the "Baby Come Back" sample and the instrumentation provided by strings and hand claps.

"Come Back to Me" was written and produced by Antonina Armato and Tim James, who are known for numerous Disney music projects. The strings were arranged by Nicky Scappa and Read, and played by the latter. Hudgens performs backing vocals alongside singer-songwriter Char Licera. The song was mixed by Serban Ghenea at Mixstar Studios in Virginia Beach, Virginia and mastered by Steven Marcussen at Marcussen Mastering in Los Angeles, California. "Come Back to Me" was released as Hudgens' debut single on September 12, 2006, through digital distribution. On October 10, 2006, it was serviced for contemporary hit radio airplay in the United States. It was first released physically on December 15, 2006, in Germany, alongside the b-side track "Don't Talk". The single was later released via digital download in European countries on December 18, 2006. A CD single was released in Germany on February 2, 2007, featuring the song's music video, the album track "Too Emotional" and a photo gallery.

Musically, "Come Back to Me" is an R&B and pop song with an instrumentation consisting of urban beats, strings and hand claps. In an interview with Madison Chapman from Time for Kids, Hudgens acknowledged the variety of musical styles present on her debut album, calling it a "fun mixture of everything". She used "Come Back to Me" as an example of the multiple genres on the album and described it as "pop and R&B". The song opens with a string-laden intro. Hudgens delivers a spoken word breakdown in the bridge. Bill Lamb of About.com noted Hudgens' vocals as "loose" and "friendly" on the track. The song samples American rock band Player's single "Baby Come Back" (1977), written by Peter Beckett and J.C. Crowley, who both received writing credits on the song. This song is composed in F major with a tempo of 88 beats per minute.

== Critical reception ==
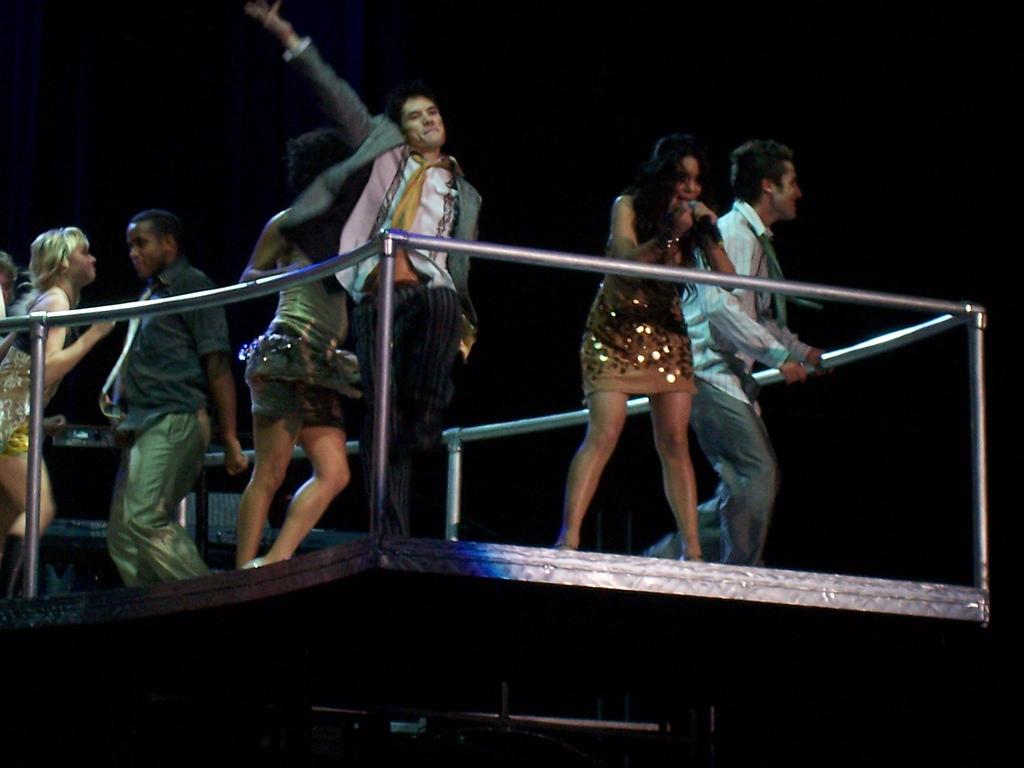
Hudgens performing "Come Back to Me" during High School Musical: The Concert

The song received generally positive reviews from music critics. About.com writer Bill Lamb rated "Come Back to Me" three and a half stars out of five; he praised its pop sound and Hudgens' "engaging personality", but criticized it for having a manufactured sound from the "Disney pop factory". Moreover, Lamb wrote: "'Come Back to Me' is unlikely to linger too long in your memory, but it also fails to generate any annoying after taste. Program it into your listening when you need a contemporary, breezy, light pop confection... Sure, you are being manipulated by the corporate music establishment, but the song is fun." He also noted that the "Baby Come Back" sample was possibly added to "trigger pleasant deja vu in parents listening along with their kids". In an editorial review for Rhapsody, Nick Cavalieri named the song one of the best tracks on V.

Kyle Anderson of MTV Newsroom deemed "Come Back to Me" a song with "a clever sample and a particularly infectious hook". Entertainment Weekly writer Leah Greenblatt considered the song the album's standout and said that it "excellently jacks a sample from soft-rock smash 'Baby Come Back'." In a more mixed review, Fraser McAlpine of BBC Music rated "Come Back to Me" three stars out of five and commented that the song sounded unoriginal and said that several other songs appeared to have been "mashed together" to create it. Furthermore, McAlpine said: "Vanessa acquits herself well on the vocals... but it's a bit overproduced and slightly soulless in that kind of relentlessly-perky way that graduates of the school of Disney stardom sometimes have."

== Music video and live performances ==
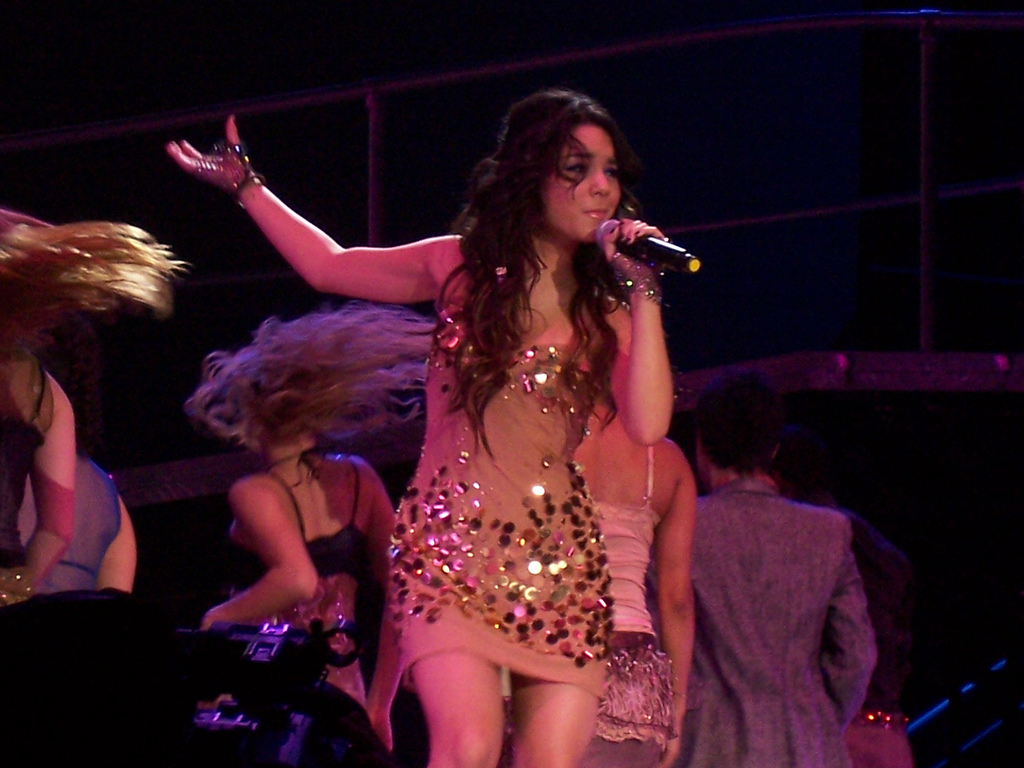
Hudgens performing "Come Back to Me" during High School Musical: The Concert

The music video for "Come Back to Me" was directed by Chris Applebaum. The video was first shown on the Disney Channel on August 25, 2006, following the premiere of The Cheetah Girls 2. Hudgens walks onto the set of a music video, applies her makeup and changes her shoes. She then performs while dancing against a brightly lit backdrop. Next, she is shown performing and dancing in a black room with numerous chandeliers flickering on and off. She later appears on a red stage with circles flickering in various colors. Afterwards, more shots of the black room is shown, including one in which she is swinging on a chandelier. In the last scene, she sings and dances in front of a colorful background. Black-and-white shots of her and her friends are interspersed throughout the video, and Hudgens' friend, actress Alexa Nikolas, makes an appearance. The Arizona Republic writer Bill Goodykoontz wrote that Hudgens shows a somewhat mature side in the video: "[W]hen your only context for ever having seen Hudgens is starring as Gabriella, the sweet little brainiac in High School Musical, it's certainly different to see her flouncing around in spaghetti-strap tops, rolling her shoulders and whatnot." A director's cut version of the video appears on the physical release of the single.

As part of promotion, Hudgens performed "Come Back to Me" on several occasions. She first performed it while serving as the opening act for The Cheetah Girls during The Party's Just Begun Tour in the fall of 2006. On September 28, 2006, she performed it on an episode of Good Morning America, and on Live with Regis & Kelly later the same day. She also performed the song at the nationwide tour High School Musical: The Concert, which she toured alongside her High School Musical cast mates.

== Chart performance ==
In the United States, "Come Back to Me" made its debut at number 79 on the Billboard Hot 100 in the issue dated September 30, 2006. The song ascended and descended on the chart for several weeks before reaching its peak position of number 55, in the issue dated December 9, 2006. It also peaked at number 44 on the Hot Digital Songs chart, number 40 on the Hot Digital Tracks, number 18 on the Mainstream Top 40, number 22 on Pop 100 Airplay, number 28 on the Pop 100 and number 63 on Radio Songs. The song has been certified gold by the Recording Industry Association of America for equivalent sales of 500,000 units in the United States. Across Europe, "Come Back to Me" fared better on the charts and peaked at number 43 on European Hot 100 Singles. In France, it peaked at number 12 and remained on the chart for a total of 25 weeks before falling off. In Italy, it debuted at number eight, which became its peak position, and stayed on the chart for two weeks. The song achieved its highest peak position in New Zealand, where it reached number six and spent five weeks in the top ten. In total, it appeared on the chart for 17 weeks. The song also peaked at number 36 in Australia, number 58 in Germany and number 100 on the UK Singles Chart.

== Formats and track listings ==
- CD single
1. "Come Back to Me" – 2:46
2. "Don't Talk" – 2:34
- Digital download
1. "Come Back to Me" – 2:47
- Enhanced CD single
1. "Come Back to Me" – 2:46
2. "Too Emotional" – 2:50
3. "Come Back to Me" (Photo gallery)
4. "Come Back to Me" (Director's cut video) – 2:45
- Remix download
1. "Come Back to Me" (Bimbo Jones radio edit) – 2:55

== Credits and personnel ==
- Songwriting – Antonina Armato, Tim James, Peter Beckett, J.C. Crowley
- Production – Antonina Armato, Tim James
- Engineering – Nigel Lundemo, Read
- Programming – Nicky Scappa, Nigel Lundemo
- Associate production – The Honor Role
- String arrangement – Nicky Scappa, Read
- Strings – Read
- Lead vocals - Vanessa Hudgens
- Background vocals – Char Licera, Vanessa Hudgens

Credits are adapted from the V album liner notes.

== Charts ==
=== Weekly charts ===
Weekly chart performance for "Come Back to Me"
Chart (2006–2007)	Peak position
Australia (ARIA)	36
Canada CHR/Top 40 (Billboard)	35
European Hot 100 Singles (Billboard)	43
France (SNEP)	12
Germany (GfK)	58
Italy (FIMI)	8
New Zealand (Recorded Music NZ)	6
Spain (Promusicae)	17
UK Singles (Official Charts)	100
US Billboard Hot 100	55
US Pop 100 (Billboard)	28
US Pop Airplay (Billboard)	18

== Certifications ==
Region	Certification	Certified units/sales
United States (RIAA)	Gold	500,000^{‡}
^{‡} Sales+streaming figures based on certification alone.

== Radio dates and release history ==
Release dates for "Come Back to Me"
Country	Release date	Format(s)
United States	September 12, 2006	Digital download
United States	October 10, 2006	Contemporary hit radio
Germany	December 15, 2006	CD single
United Kingdom	December 18, 2006	Digital download
Germany	February 2, 2007	CD single
