= Say OK =

Single by Vanessa Hudgens

from the album V
- Released: March 27, 2007
- Recorded: 2006
- Studio: Maratone Studios, Stockholm Studios, and Jungle Room Studios (Burbank, California)
- Genre: R&B
- Length: 3:41 (album version); 3:32 (single mix)
- Label: Hollywood
- Songwriters: Arnthor Birgisson; Savan Kotecha
- Producer: Arnthor Birgisson

Vanessa Hudgens singles chronology
"Come Back to Me" (2006)	"Say OK" (2007)	"You Are the Music in Me" (2008)

Music video
- "Say OK" on YouTube

"Say OK" is a song recorded by American singer Vanessa Hudgens on her debut album V, which was written by Arnthor Birgisson and Savan Kotecha. It was released on March 27, 2007, through Hollywood Records as the second and final single from Hudgens' debut studio album, V (2006).

== Background ==
At first, "Let Go" would have been the second single from the album, but this was replaced at the last minute for "Say OK". The song was released on the U.S. iTunes on January 12, 2007 and was played U.S. radio two months later, on March 27. In New Zealand the song was released on May 26, 2007 and in Europe on May 28, 2007.

The song was included on the CD Radio Disney Jams, Vol. 10, as well as the Family Jams CD Under Walt Disney Records. Vanessa released the song on the tour of High School Musical: The Concert and opening some shows on the tour the band The Cheetah Girls: The Party’s Just Begun Tour.

"Say OK"
A 31-second sample of Vanessa Hudgens' "Say OK".

== Music video ==
The song's first music video premiered on Disney Channel on January 12, 2007, after the series premiere of Cory in the House. It features Hudgens performing the song on the High School Musical: The Concert tour and includes some behind-the-scenes footage shown in black-and-white. It was directed by Chris Applebaum, who directed her first music video, "Come Back to Me".

The second version and official music video premiered on March 13, 2007, on Disney Channel and March 26, 2007, on MTV's Total Request Live. It was directed by Darren Grant and features Hudgens with her then-boyfriend Zac Efron and some friends at a bowling alley playing a game of bowling. After they finish the game, they have dinner at the bowling alley. The video then shows Hudgens and Efron frolicking on a beach together and later, their friends arrive and join in on the fun. Solo shots of Hudgens both at the bowling alley and on the beach in Los Angeles, California, sitting on a swing and merry-go-round are interspersed throughout the video.

== Track listing ==
- Digital download
1. "Say OK" (single mix) – 3:32
- CD single
1. "Say OK" (single mix) – 3:32
2. "Say OK" (Albert Castillo Extended Remix) – 6:01
3. "Say OK" (Albert Castillo Remix) – 3:25

== Credits and personnel ==
- Vanessa Hudgens – lead vocals
- Arnthor Birgisson – keyboards, producer, programming, songwriting
- Savan Kotecha – songwriting
- Brian Reeves – engineer
- Jeanette Ohlsson – background vocals

Credits are adapted from the V album liner notes.

== Chart performance ==
"Say OK" debuted at number 67 on the US Billboard Hot 100 chart dated February 17, 2007, and peaked at number 61 the following week. The song has been certified gold by the Recording Industry Association of America for equivalent sales of 500,000 units in the United States.

== Charts ==
=== Weekly charts ===
Weekly chart performance for "Say OK"
Chart (2007)	Peak position
Italy (FIMI)	39
UK Singles (OCC)	124
US Billboard Hot 100	61
US Pop 100 (Billboard)	47

=== Year-end charts ===
Year-end chart performance for "Say OK"
Chart (2007)	Position
Brazil (Crowley)	39

== Certifications ==
Region	Certification	Certified units/sales
United States (RIAA)	Gold	500,000^{‡}
^{‡} Sales+streaming figures based on certification alone.

== Release history ==
Release dates and formats for "Say OK"
Region	Date	Format	Label(s)	Ref.
United States	March 27, 2007	Mainstream airplay	Hollywood	
