= Vanessa Hudgens =

American actress and singer (born 1988)

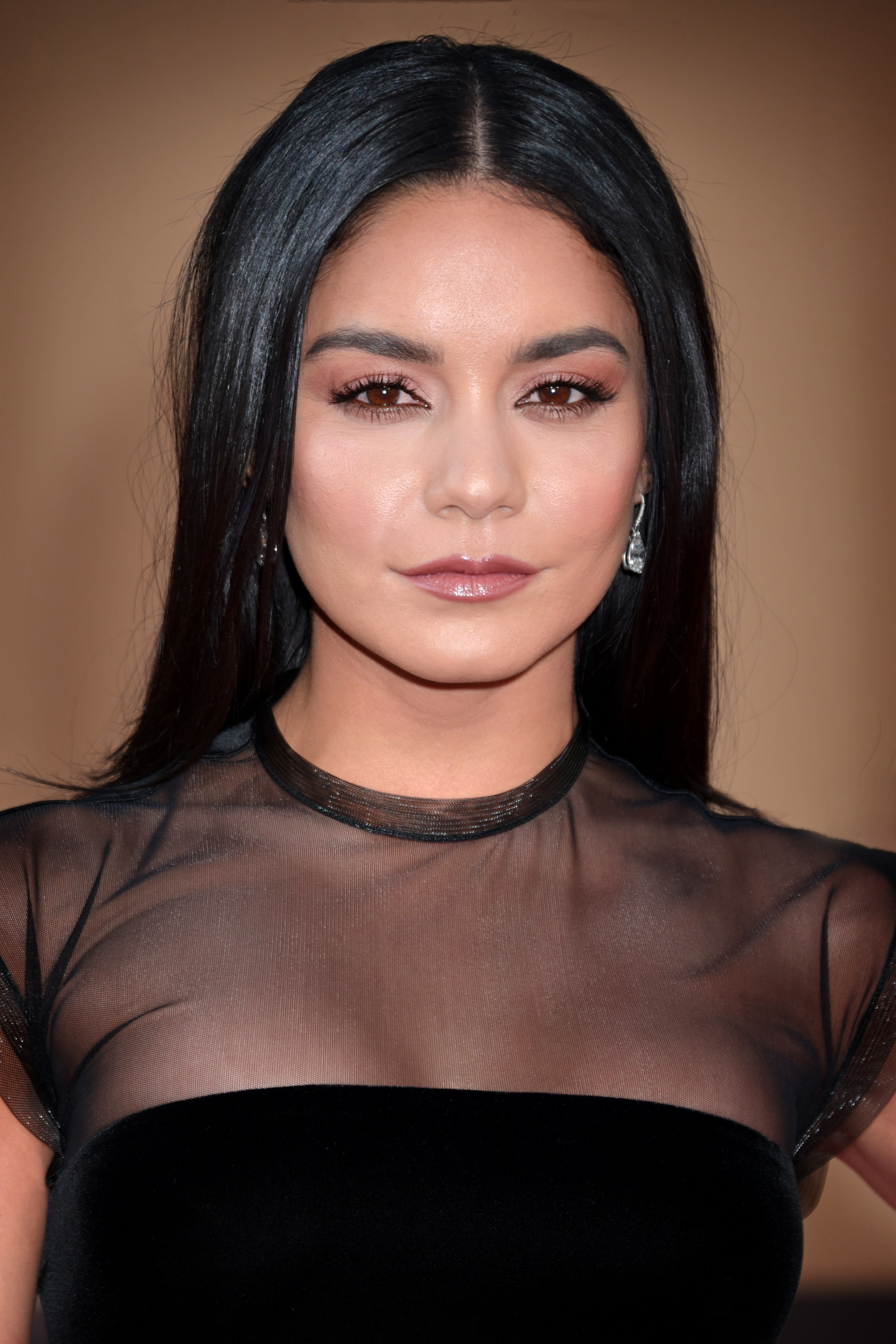
- Hudgens in 2019
- Born: Vanessa Anne Hudgens; December 14, 1988 (age 37); Salinas, California, U.S.
- Occupations: Actress; singer
- Years active: 1998–present
- Spouse: Cole Tucker (m. 2023)
- Children: 2
- Musical career
- Genres: Pop; R&B
- Instrument: Vocals
- Label: Hollywood

Vanessa Anne Hudgens (/ˈhʌdʒənz/ HUJ-ənz; born December 14, 1988) is an American actress and singer. After making her feature film debut in Thirteen (2003), Hudgens rose to fame portraying Gabriella Montez in the High School Musical film series (2006–2008), which brought her mainstream recognition. Through Hollywood Records she released two albums, V (2006) and Identified (2008).

Hudgens appeared in the films Bandslam (2009), Beastly, Sucker Punch (both 2011), Journey 2: The Mysterious Island, Spring Breakers (both 2012), Second Act (2018), Bad Boys for Life (2020), and Tick, Tick ... Boom! (2021). She starred in the Netflix Christmas films The Princess Switch (2018) and its sequels (2020 and 2021), and The Knight Before Christmas (2019), co-producing these Christmas movies.

Hudgens played the role of Emily Locke in the NBC series Powerless (2017). She made her Broadway stage debut playing Gigi in the musical revival of Gigi (2015) and had roles in two of Fox's live musical productions: Rizzo in Grease Live! (2016) and Maureen Johnson in Rent: Live (2019). In 2022, Hudgens co-hosted the Met Gala in Manhattan.

== Early life ==
Vanessa Anne Hudgens was born in Salinas, California, and was raised in various locations along the West Coast, from Oregon to Southern California. Her mother, Gina (née Guangco), held a succession of office jobs, and her father, Gregory Hudgens, was a firefighter. She has a younger sister Stella, who is an actor and model. Vanessa was raised as a Catholic. Her father, who died of cancer in February 2016, was of mostly English descent, and her mother is Filipina and grew up in Mindanao. All of her grandparents were musicians.

== Career ==
=== 1998–2004: Early roles ===
Starting in 1998, Hudgens performed in musical theater as a singer, and appeared in local productions of Carousel, The Wizard of Oz, The King and I, The Music Man, and Cinderella, among others. Two years later, she began auditioning for commercials and television shows, and her family moved to Los Angeles after she appeared in a television commercial. She began her acting career at age 15, and she briefly attended Orange County High School of the Arts, followed by homeschooling with tutors.

Hudgens had her first acting role in an episode of the sitcom Still Standing, airing on CBS in 2002, in which she portrayed Tiffany. Later that year, she appeared in an episode of the series Robbery Homicide Division, airing on CBS. Hudgens made her film debut in the 2003 drama film Thirteen, in the supporting role of Noel. The film grossed $10 million worldwide and received positive critical reviews. USA Today called Thirteen the most "powerful of all recent wayward-youth sagas". Hudgens subsequently landed a role in the 2004 science fiction-adventure film Thunderbirds, based on the 1960s television series. Hudgens portrayed the character of Tin-tin. The film was a commercial failure and was strongly criticized for "abandoning the original concepts".

=== 2005–2008: High School Musical and music ===
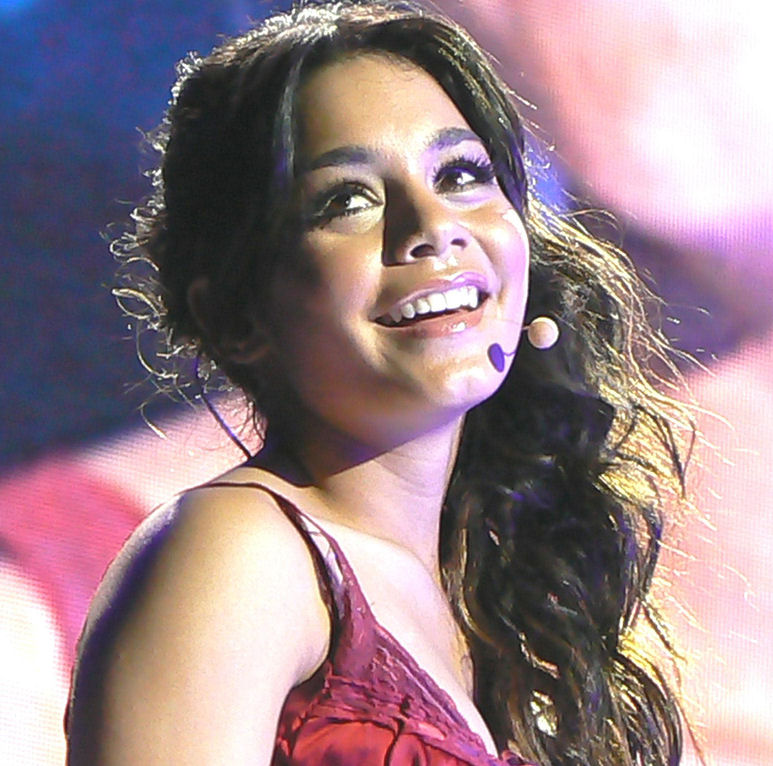
Hudgens performing on the High School Musical: The Concert tour in 2007

In January 2006, Hudgens played Gabriella Montez, one of the lead roles in the Disney Channel Original Movie High School Musical. The film saw Hudgens portraying the new girl at high school who falls for the captain of the basketball team. The two later reveal a passion for singing, and audition for the school play together. Hudgens starred alongside Zac Efron and Ashley Tisdale, the former of which she was partnered up with during the auditioning process due to their "chemistry". It was Disney Channel's most-watched film that year with 7.7 million viewers in its premiere broadcast in the US, until August's premiere of The Cheetah Girls 2, which achieved 8.1 million viewers.

For the film, Hudgens recorded numerous songs which had commercial success. The song "Breaking Free", a duet with Efron, became Hudgens's highest peak on the US Billboard Hot 100 at number 4, and number 9 in the UK. Following the success of the film, Hudgens released her debut studio album, V, on September 26, 2006. It sold 34,000 copies in its first week, and debuted at number 24 on the US Billboard 200 chart. In February 2007, the album was certified Gold by the Recording Industry Association of America. By August 2009, the album had sold 570,000 copies in the US. It was preceded by two singles, "Come Back to Me" and "Say OK", both of which were moderately successful in several countries.

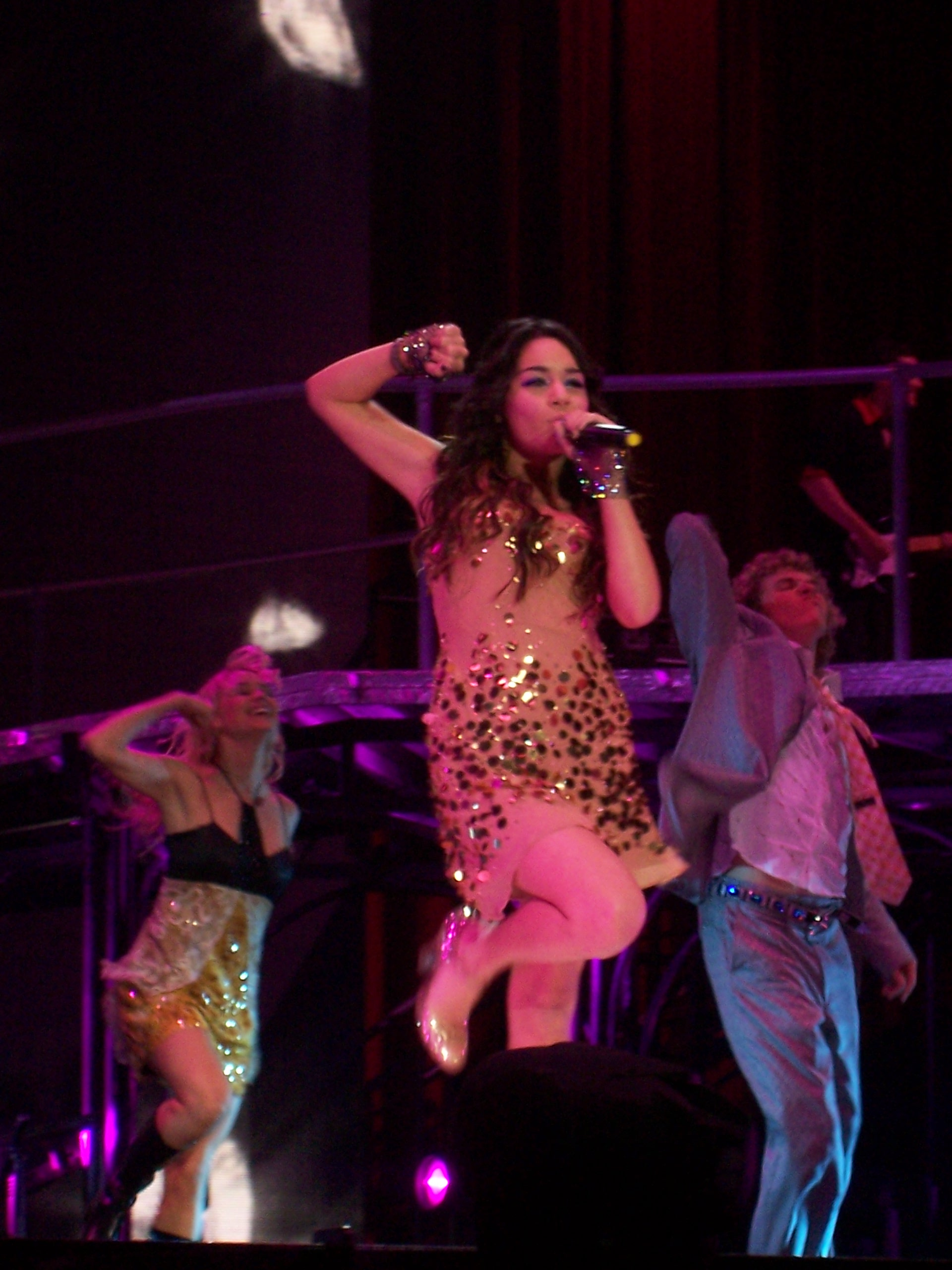
Hudgens in concert in January 2007

In 2007, Hudgens reprised her role as Gabriella in High School Musical 2, released on August 17. The show was watched by over 17.2 million viewers in the US, almost 10 million more than its predecessor, making it the most-watched Disney Channel Original Movie of all time. Disney Channel aired a weekly program called Road to High School Musical 2, beginning on June 8, and leading up to the premiere of High School Musical 2 in August. The show offered viewers a behind-the-scenes look into the production of the movie. The opening number "What Time Is It" was first broadcast on Radio Disney on May 25, 2007, and "You Are the Music in Me" was introduced on July 13, 2007. The film was generally well received by critics. USA Today's Robert Bianco awarded the film three stars out of four, stating that High School Musical 2 was "sweet, smart, bursting with talent and energy, and awash in innocence". While critics enjoyed the film, they noted that the timing of its premiere seemed odd, premiering just when school was about to resume again whereas the film's plot involved the gang going on summer vacation.

Her second studio album, Identified, was released on July 1, 2008, in the United States. It sold 22,000 copies in its first week, 12,000 less than V. Despite the drop in sales, the album debuted at number 23 on the Billboard 200, one spot higher than V. The album was preceded by one single, "Sneakernight", which peaked at number 88 on the Billboard Hot 100. Hudgens reprised her role in High School Musical 3: Senior Year, the first film from the franchise to be released theatrically. It opened at number one at the North American box office in October 2008, earning $42 million in its first weekend, which broke the record previously held by Mamma Mia! for the biggest opening by a musical. The film finished with $252 million worldwide, which exceeded Disney's expectations.

=== 2009–2017: Mainstream film and television ===
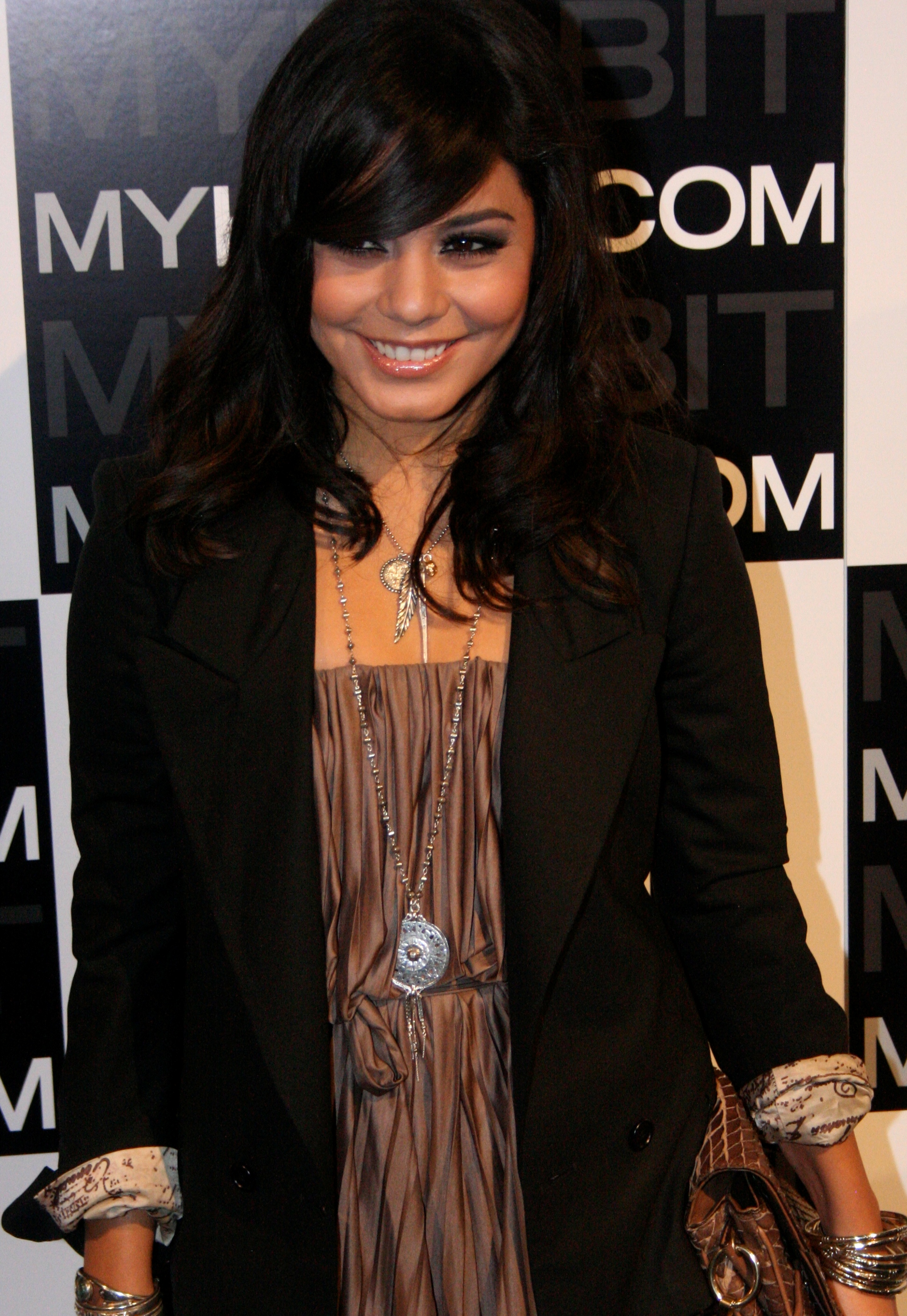
Hudgens at the MyHabit launch at Skylight West Studios in May 2011

Following the completion of the High School Musical series, Hudgens said that she was taking a break from her music career to focus more on acting. She played a supporting role in a musical comedy Bandslam, which was released theatrically on August 14, 2009. Hudgens played "Sa5m", a 15-year-old awkward freshman with untapped talents. Although Bandslam was commercially unsuccessful, Hudgens's performance received praise from critics. David Waddington of the North Wales Pioneer noted that Hudgens "outshines the rest of the cast, failing to fit in with the outcast narrative and making the inevitable climactic ending all the more expected".

In 2010, Hudgens starred in the musical Rent as Mimi during August 6–8, 2010, at the Hollywood Bowl. Her involvement in the production drew negative comments, but director Neil Patrick Harris defended his decision with casting Hudgens by saying, "Vanessa is awesome. She's a friend. I asked her to come in and sing to make sure she had the chops for it. And she was very committed and seemed great."

In 2011, Hudgens starred with Alex Pettyfer in the film Beastly, based on Alex Flinn's 2007 novel Beastly. She played one of the main characters, Linda Taylor, and described her as "the 'beauty' of the story but not the stereotypical beauty everyone thinks of." Hudgens and Pettyfer were described as ShoWest Stars of Tomorrow. Beastly was released on March 4, 2011, to mostly negative reviews. The film was screened at ShoWest and drew enthusiastic reactions from the luncheon crowd of exhibition officials. The film went on to make $28 million worldwide as of 2012. Hudgens also starred as one of the five female leads in the action film Sucker Punch, directed by Zack Snyder. She played Blondie, an institutionalized girl in an asylum. The film was released in March 2011, and grossed $19 million in its first weekend at the North American box office, opening at number two. By the end of its run, Sucker Punch totaled $89 million worldwide.

In 2012, Hudgens starred alongside Dwayne Johnson and Josh Hutcherson in the science fantasy action-adventure film Journey 2: The Mysterious Island (2012), the sequel to the 2008 film Journey to the Center of the Earth, playing Hutcherson's love interest. The film earned $325 million worldwide during its theatrical run, which outperformed its predecessor. It received generally mixed to negative reviews from critics.

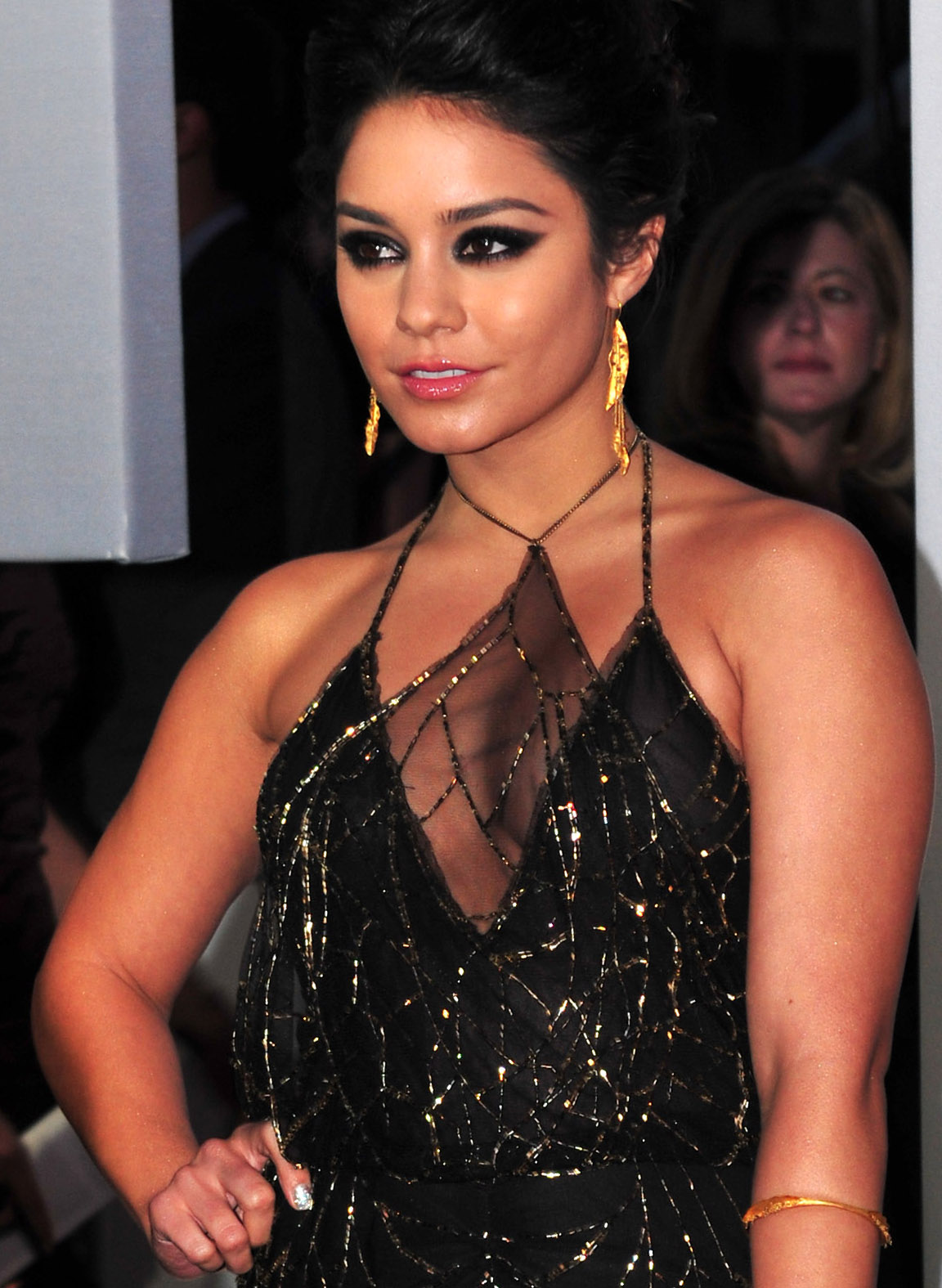
Hudgens at the 2012 People's Choice Awards

In 2013, Hudgens starred alongside Selena Gomez, Ashley Benson, Rachel Korine and James Franco in the film Spring Breakers. The story followed four college-aged girls who decide to rob a fast food restaurant in order to pay for their spring break. It was released theatrically in March 2013, receiving generally positive reviews. The film featured mature themes such as drug use, violence, and sexual escapades. To coincide with the film, Hudgens released the dubstep-influenced song "$$$ex", with a music video featuring clips from the film. The song features guest vocals from YLA, and was produced by Rock Mafia. Hudgens later expressed her discomfort with a sex scene: "It was very nerve-racking for me. I told my agent that I never want to do it ever again." Later that year, Hudgens played Cindy Paulson in The Frozen Ground, a film based on the Robert Hansen serial murder case, with Hudgens portraying Hansen's only known victim to escape. She co-starred with John Cusack and Nicolas Cage. She also starred in the action film Machete Kills, based on the character Machete from the Spy Kids franchise. The film was directed by Robert Rodriguez. By the end of the year, Hudgens starred alongside Michael Shannon, Joel Marsh Garland, Dree Hemingway, and Nick Lashaway in Spike Jonze's short comedy-drama film Choose You. The cast performed the film live as a skit at the first YouTube Music Awards, to the music of Avicii.

In 2014, Hudgens starred as a pregnant teenage runaway girl in the drama film Gimme Shelter with Brendan Fraser, written and directed by Ron Krauss. In 2015, Hudgens starred in the Columbia Pictures comedy horror film Freaks of Nature. That same year, she took on the title role in a production of Alan Jay Lerner and Frederick Loewe's Gigi, which opened at the Kennedy Center from January 16 to February 12, before transferring to Broadway on April 8. The production closed on June 21.

On January 31, 2016, Hudgens starred in the role of Rizzo in Grease Live!, Fox's live broadcast based on the original Broadway musical. Hudgens dedicated her performance to her father, who died from cancer one day before the special aired. In 2017, Hudgens played Emily Locke on NBC's comedy series Powerless, which was based on DC Comics characters. It was cancelled after one season. That same year, Hudgens was featured on Shawn Hook's single "Reminding Me" and starred in the music video. She hosted the 2017 Billboard Music Awards with rapper Ludacris, which premiered on May 21. Hudgens also served as a judge alongside Nigel Lythgoe and Mary Murphy on the 14th season of the American reality dance show So You Think You Can Dance.

=== 2018–present: Career expansion ===
In 2018, Hudgens starred in the romantic comedy film Dog Days, alongside Finn Wolfhard and Nina Dobrev. She collaborated with electronic dance music duo Phantoms on the single "Lay With Me", released in September 2018. She starred in the Netflix film The Princess Switch in November 2018, in which she portrayed both a European duchess and a pastry chef from Chicago, who temporarily switch roles. In December 2018, she co-starred opposite Jennifer Lopez in the comedy film Second Act, directed by Peter Segal. Hudgens returned for the 15th season of So You Think You Can Dance, as part of the panel of judges. The same year, she essayed the role of Vanessa Morales in a production by Kennedy Center of Lin-Manuel Miranda's original musical In the Heights.

In January 2019, Hudgens starred in another Fox live musical presentation, Rent: Live, as Maureen Johnson. Hudgens also co-starred with Mads Mikkelsen in Polar, the Netflix film adaptation of Víctor Santos's 2013 graphic novel Polar: Came From the Cold. In November 2019, she starred in and served as a producer on the Netflix film The Knight Before Christmas.

In 2020, Hudgens appeared in the third entry in the Bad Boys franchise, Bad Boys for Life, which grossed over $426 million worldwide. In November that year, she starred in and produced the Netflix film The Princess Switch's sequel, The Princess Switch: Switched Again. By the end of the year, Hudgens hosted the MTV Movie & TV Awards: Greatest of All Time television special, which highlighted the greatest moments of film and television since the 1980s, as well as moments from past editions of the award ceremony.

In 2021, she voiced the lead character, Sunny Starscout, in the animated Netflix film My Little Pony: A New Generation. In November 2021, Hudgens appeared in Netflix's biographical film Tick, Tick... Boom!, adapted from the musical Tick, Tick... Boom!, with Hudgens portraying playwright Jonathan Larson's friend Karessa Johnson, directed by Lin-Manuel Miranda. Hudgens lent her voice to songs on the film's soundtrack. Later that month, she appeared in the third installment of Netflix's The Princess Switch film series, The Princess Switch 3: Romancing the Star, directed by Michael Rohl. Hudgens reprised her three roles from earlier, and also served as a producer.

In 2022, Hudgens starred alongside Alexandra Shipp, Kiersey Clemons, and Ezra Miller in the Paramount Pictures action thriller film, Asking for It. The film released in theaters, digitally, and on Blu-ray on March 4. Later that month, she co-hosted the 94th Academy Awards red carpet pre-show with Terrence J, Sofia Carson, and Brandon Maxwell. In May 2022, Hudgens co-hosted the Met Gala red carpet livestream for Vogue with actress and television personality La La Anthony, and the magazine's editor-at-large Hamish Bowles. In June 2022, she co-hosted the 30th MTV Movie & TV Awards with Tayshia Adams, with Hudgens hosting the first half of the ceremony for film and scripted television. Hudgens starred in Hamish Linklater and Lily Rabe's film Downtown Owl, alongside Rabe, Ed Harris, Finn Wittrock, Jack Dylan Grazer, and August Blanco Rosenstein, produced by Sony Pictures' production label Stage 6 Films.

In 2024, Hudgens competed in season eleven of The Masked Singer as "Goldfish". She won the season with Scott Porter as "Gumball" finishing in second place. Both of them made references to their work in Bandslam.

== Personal life ==
Hudgens was raised Catholic but now identifies as a non-denominational Christian. She attends the Los Angeles affiliate church of Hillsong Church.

In 2005, Hudgens began dating her High School Musical co-star Zac Efron. Their relationship was highly publicized until their breakup in 2010. From 2011 to 2019, Hudgens dated actor Austin Butler. In 2020, Hudgens began dating Major League Baseball shortstop Cole Tucker. Hudgens and Tucker married on December 2, 2023, in Tulum, Mexico. The couple have two children, born in summer 2024 and November 2025.

In May 2016, Hudgens paid $1,000 in restitution for damage of U.S. Forest Service property by carving initials within a heart on a rock in the Coconino National Forest and displaying it on her personal Instagram feed.

In March 2020, Hudgens posted an Instagram video where she stated that it is "inevitable" that people will die from the COVID-19 pandemic. The video caused controversy as critics accused her of minimizing the impact of the disease and the need for preventive measures. She subsequently apologized for her "insensitive" remarks.

In October 2021, Hudgens was shown by Architectural Digest to be living in the "Little DeMille" house, which director Cecil B. DeMille built for his mistress.

=== Leaked photos ===
On September 6, 2007, photos allegedly stolen from Hudgens were leaked online, one showing her posing in lingerie and another showing her nude. A statement from her publicist said that the photo was taken privately and it was unfortunate that they were released on the Internet. Hudgens later apologized, saying that she was "embarrassed over the situation" and regretted having "taken [those] photos". In January 2008, Hudgens released a statement indicating that she declined to comment further on the subject. In October 2007, OK! magazine speculated that Hudgens would be dropped from High School Musical 3 as a result of the explicit images, but The Walt Disney Company denied this, stating, "Vanessa has apologized for what was obviously a lapse in judgment. We hope she's learned a valuable lesson."

In August 2009, another set of images showing Hudgens topless emerged on the Internet. Hudgens's representatives did not comment, though her lawyers requested the removal of the pictures. In late 2009, Hudgens sued www.moejackson.com for posting nude "self-portrait photographs" of her taken on a mobile phone in a private home. Hudgens later commented on the photos' impact on her career in the October issue of Allure, stating, "Whenever anybody asks me, would I do nudity in a film, if I say that it's something I'm not comfortable with, they're like, 'Bullshit, you've already done it.' If anything, it makes it more embarrassing, because that was a private thing. It's screwed up that someone screwed me over like that. At least some people are learning from my mistake." According to Us Weekly, additional nude images were released on the Internet on March 15, 2011.

== Public image ==
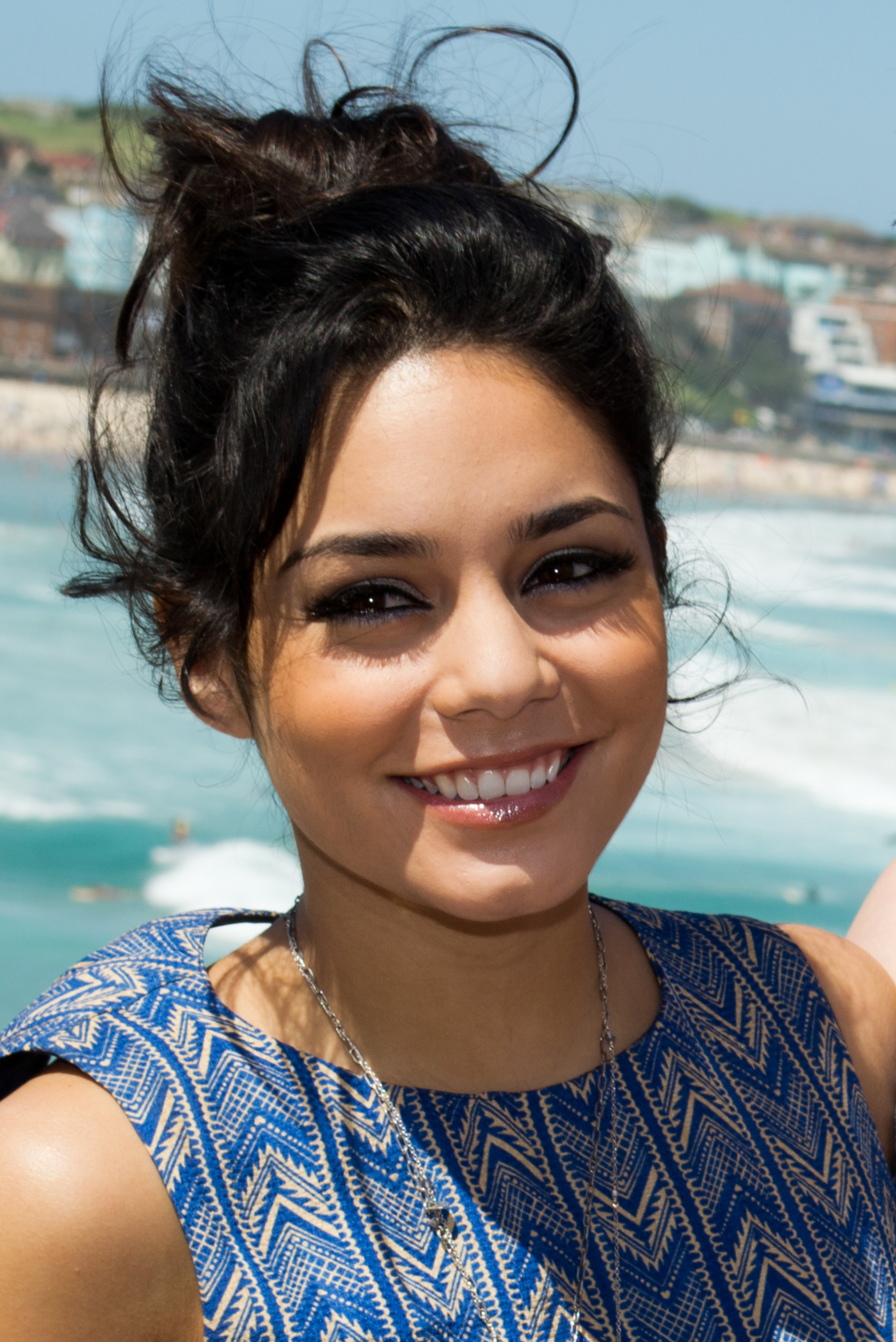
Hudgens in January 2012 at Bondi Beach, Sydney

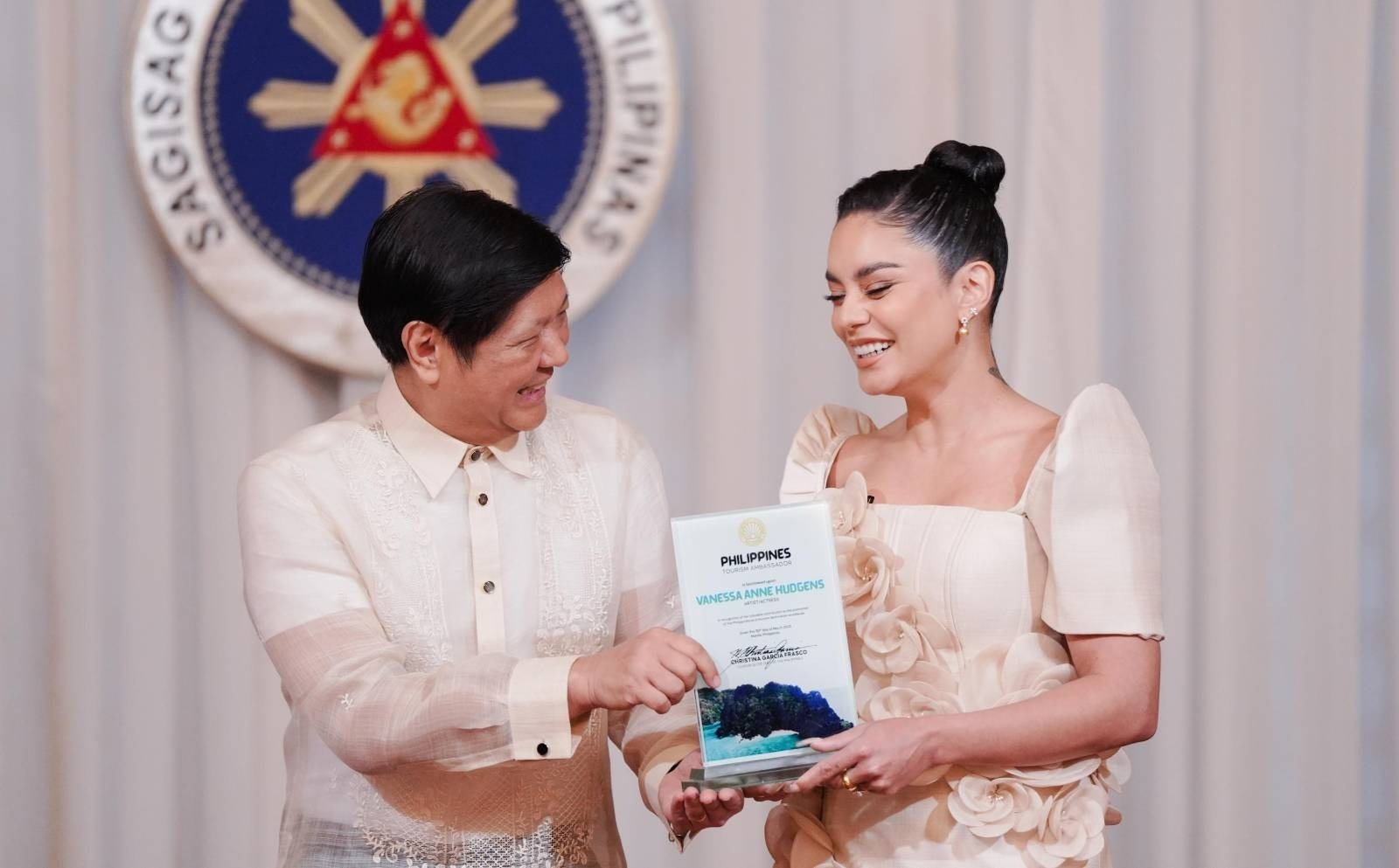
Philippine president Bongbong Marcos presenting the Global Tourism Ambassador Award to Hudgens in March 2023

Hudgens was represented by William Morris Agency but signed on to Creative Artists Agency in 2011. In 2006, Hudgens's earnings were estimated to be $2 million. Hudgens was included in the Forbes richest list in early 2007, and the Forbes article noted that she was included in Young Hollywood's Top Earning-Stars. On December 12, 2008, Hudgens was ranked No. 20 in the list of Forbes's "High Earners Under 30", having reported to have an estimated earnings of $3 million in 2008. She was number 62 at FHM's 100 Sexiest Women 2008 and number 42 in the 2009 list. Hudgens is also featured in Maxim's lists. She was included in People's annual "100 Most Beautiful People" 2008 and 2009 lists.

Hudgens promotes Neutrogena and was the 2008 featured celebrity for Sears's back-to school campaign. In 2007, she became a spokesperson for Marc Eckō products but ended the contract after two years. Hudgens regularly volunteers for charitable activities, including those for Best Buddies International, Lollipop Theater Network, St. Jude Children's Research Hospital and the VH1 Save The Music Foundation. Hudgens is also featured in A Very Special Christmas Vol.7 disc which benefits the Special Olympics. Hudgens is also part of the "Stand Up to Cancer (SU2C): Change The Odds" along with other Hollywood stars including Zac Efron, Dakota Fanning, Kristen Bell, and others.

Brian Schall sued Hudgens in 2007 for an alleged "breach of contract"; according to the suit, Schall claims he advanced costs and expenses on Hudgens's behalf for her songwriting and recording career. Schall claims Hudgens owed him $150,000 after helping her earn more than $5 million for her music career. Hudgens argued that she was a 16-year-old minor when she signed the contract in October 2005, and therefore too young to do so. She subsequently disaffirmed it on October 9, 2008. Papers filed in court by her lawyer say California's Family Code "provides that the contract of a minor is voidable and may be disaffirmed before (age 18) or within a reasonable time afterward." In 2008, Hudgens was sued by Johnny Vieira, who claims he was owed a share of Hudgens's advances, royalties and merchandising revenue in exchange for his management services. Vieira accuses Hudgens of abandoning her talent team as soon as she became a commercial name. In early May 2009, the case was settled.

Hudgens is a frequent attendee of the Coachella Valley Music and Arts Festival. She has been unofficially called the "Queen of Coachella". She is known for her boho-chic fashion style, occasionally going barefoot at the festival as well.

In March 2023, Hudgens was named as a global tourism ambassador by the Philippine government.

== Filmography ==
Hudgens has over 80 credits to her name within film, television, and on stage.

== Discography ==
- V (2006)
- Identified (2008)

== Tours ==
Headlining

- Identified Summer Tour (2008)

Co-headlining

- High School Musical: The Concert (2006–07)

Opening act

- The Cheetah Girls – The Party's Just Begun Tour (2006)

== Awards and nominations ==
Award	Year	Category	Nominated work	Result	Ref.
Alliance of Women Film Journalists Awards	2013	Actress Most in Need of a New Agent (shared with Ashley Benson, Rachel Korine & Selena Gomez)	Spring Breakers	Nominated	
Australian Kids' Choice Awards	2010	Cutest Couple (shared with Zac Efron)	High School Musical 3: Senior Year	Won	
Imagen Foundation Awards	2006	Best Actress – Television	High School Musical	Nominated	
Kids' Choice Awards	2009	Favorite Movie Actress	High School Musical 3: Senior Year	Won	
Kids' Choice Awards	2013	Favorite Movie Actress	Journey 2: The Mysterious Island	Nominated	
Kids' Choice Awards	2021	Favorite Movie Actress	The Princess Switch: Switched Again	Nominated	
MTV Movie & TV Awards	2009	Breakthrough Female Performance	High School Musical 3: Senior Year	Nominated	
MTV Movie & TV Awards	2009	Best Kiss (shared with Zac Efron)	High School Musical 3: Senior Year	Nominated	
MTV Movie & TV Awards	2014	Best Kiss (shared with Ashley Benson & James Franco)	Spring Breakers	Nominated	
MTV Movie & TV Awards	2017	Best Musical Moment (shared with the cast of Grease: Live)	"You're the One That I Want"	Won	
MTV Movie & TV Awards	2022	Best Musical Moment (shared with Andrew Garfield)	"Therapy"	Nominated	
Napa Valley Film Festival	2019	Blackbird Vineyards Visionary Award	—N/a	Won	
People's Choice Awards	2011	Favorite Movie Star Under 25	—N/a	Nominated	
People's Choice Awards	2020	Female Movie Star of 2020	Bad Boys for Life	Nominated	
People's Choice Awards	2020	Action Movie Star of 2020	Bad Boys for Life	Nominated	
Radio Disney Music Awards	2006	Best Female Artist	—N/a	Nominated	
Radio Disney Music Awards	2006	Favorite TV Star Who Sings	—N/a	Nominated	
Radio Disney Music Awards	2006	Best Song (shared with Zac Efron)	"Breaking Free"	Nominated	
Radio Disney Music Awards	2006	Best New Artist	—N/a	Nominated	
Radio Disney Music Awards	2006	Best Team Anthem (shared with High School Musical cast)	"We're All in This Together"	Won	
Radio Disney Music Awards	2006	Best Dance Style (shared with High School Musical cast)	High School Musical	Nominated	
Radio Disney Music Awards	2006	Best Song To Listen To While Getting Ready For School (shared with Zac Efron)	"Start of Something New"	Nominated	
Radio Disney Music Awards	2006	Favorite Karaoke Song (shared with Zac Efron)	"Breaking Free"	Nominated	
Radio Disney Music Awards	2006	Best True Ringer Ring Tone (shared with Zac Efron)	"Breaking Free"	Won	
Radio Disney Music Awards	2006	Best Video That Rocks	"Come Back to Me"	Won	
Radio Disney Music Awards	2006	Best Song to Play While Doing Homework (shared with Zac Efron)	"Start of Something New"	Nominated	
Radio Disney Music Awards	2006	Best Song to Wake Up To (shared with Zac Efron)	"Start of Something New"	Nominated	
Radio Disney Music Awards	2006	Best Song From A Movie (shared with Zac Efron)	"Breaking Free"	Nominated	
Radio Disney Music Awards	2006	Best Song You've Heard a Million Times and Still Love	"Come Back to Me"	Nominated	
Radio Disney Music Awards	2006	Best Song To Put On Repeat (shared with High School Musical cast)	"We're All in This Together"	Nominated	
Radio Disney Music Awards	2006	Best Song To Put On Repeat	"Come Back To Me"	Nominated	
Radio Disney Music Awards	2006	Most Stylish Singer	—N/a	Nominated	
Radio Disney Music Awards	2007	Best Top 40 Artist	—N/a	Nominated	
Radio Disney Music Awards	2007	Best Team Anthem (shared with Zac Efron)	"You Are the Music in Me"	Nominated	
Radio Disney Music Awards	2007	Most Stylish Singer	—N/a	Nominated	
Radio Disney Music Awards	2007	Best Soundtrack Song (shared with Zac Efron)	"Gotta Go My Own Way"	Won	
Radio Disney Music Awards	2007	Best Soundtrack Song (shared with High School Musical 2 cast)	"What Time Is It?"	Nominated	
Radio Disney Music Awards	2007	Best Video That Rocks	"Say OK"	Nominated	
ShoWest	2010	Female Star of Tomorrow	—N/a	Won	
Teen Choice Awards	2006	Choice TV Chemistry (shared with Zac Efron)	High School Musical	Won	
Teen Choice Awards	2006	Choice TV Breakout Star	High School Musical	Nominated	
Teen Choice Awards	2007	Choice Music: Breakout Artist – Female	—N/a	Won	
Teen Choice Awards	2008	Choice Hottie	—N/a	Won	
Teen Choice Awards	2009	Choice Movie Actress: Music/Dance	High School Musical 3: Senior Year	Nominated	
Teen Choice Awards	2009	Choice Movie: Liplock (shared with Zac Efron)	High School Musical 3: Senior Year	Nominated	
Teen Choice Awards	2009	Choice Hottie	—N/a	Nominated	
Teen Choice Awards	2011	Red Carpet Fashion Icon – Female	—N/a	Nominated	
Teen Choice Awards	2011	Choice Movie: Liplock (shared with Alex Pettyfer)	Beastly	Nominated	
Teen Choice Awards	2012	Choice Movie Actress: Sci-Fi/Fantasy	Journey 2: The Mysterious Island	Nominated	
Teen Choice Awards	2017	"See Her" Award	—N/a	Won	
Young Artist Awards	2007	Best Young Actress - TV Movie, Miniseries or Special	High School Musical	Nominated	
Young Hollywood Awards	2014	Trendsetter Award	—N/a	Won	

== See also ==
- Filipinos in the New York City metropolitan region
- List of Filipino Americans
