= Modern display of the Confederate battle flag =

Left: Square variation, based on the battle flag of the Army of Northern Virginia. It is featured on the Confederate national flags, as well as the 1894–2020 flag of Mississippi and both the 1956–2001 and 2001–2003 flags of Georgia, thus enjoying the most popular "official" adoption. Right: Most common modern variation, based on the Second Confederate Navy Jack and the battle flag of the army of Tennessee.

Although the Confederate States of America dissolved at the end of the American Civil War (1861–1865), its battle flag continues to be displayed as a symbol of white supremacy in the United States. This modern usage can be traced to the 1948 United States presidential election, when it was used by the Dixiecrats, southern Democrats who opposed civil rights for African Americans. Further display of the flag was largely a response to the civil rights movement and the passage of federal civil rights laws in the 1950s and 1960s.

== Background ==
=== National flags ===
The three flag designs used by the Confederate States of America

1861–63

1863–65

1865

The Confederate States of America used three national flags during the American Civil War from 1861 to 1865, known as the "Stars and Bars" (1861–1863), the "Stainless Banner" (1863–65), and the "Blood-Stained Banner" (1865).

The "Stars and Bars" was unpopular among Confederates for its resemblance to the United States flag, which furthermore caused confusion during battle. Criticism of the first national flag led to the rise of the battle flag design, which was incorporated by the "Stainless Banner" and "Blood-Stained Banner". Both of these national designs also failed to gain traction in the South. The "Stainless Banner" was criticized for its excessive white design, creating fears that it could be mistaken for a flag of truce and causing it to be easily soiled. The "Blood-Stained Banner", issued a little over a month before the Confederacy's surrender, was seldom used due to few flags being manufactured.

=== The vernacular "Confederate flag" ===
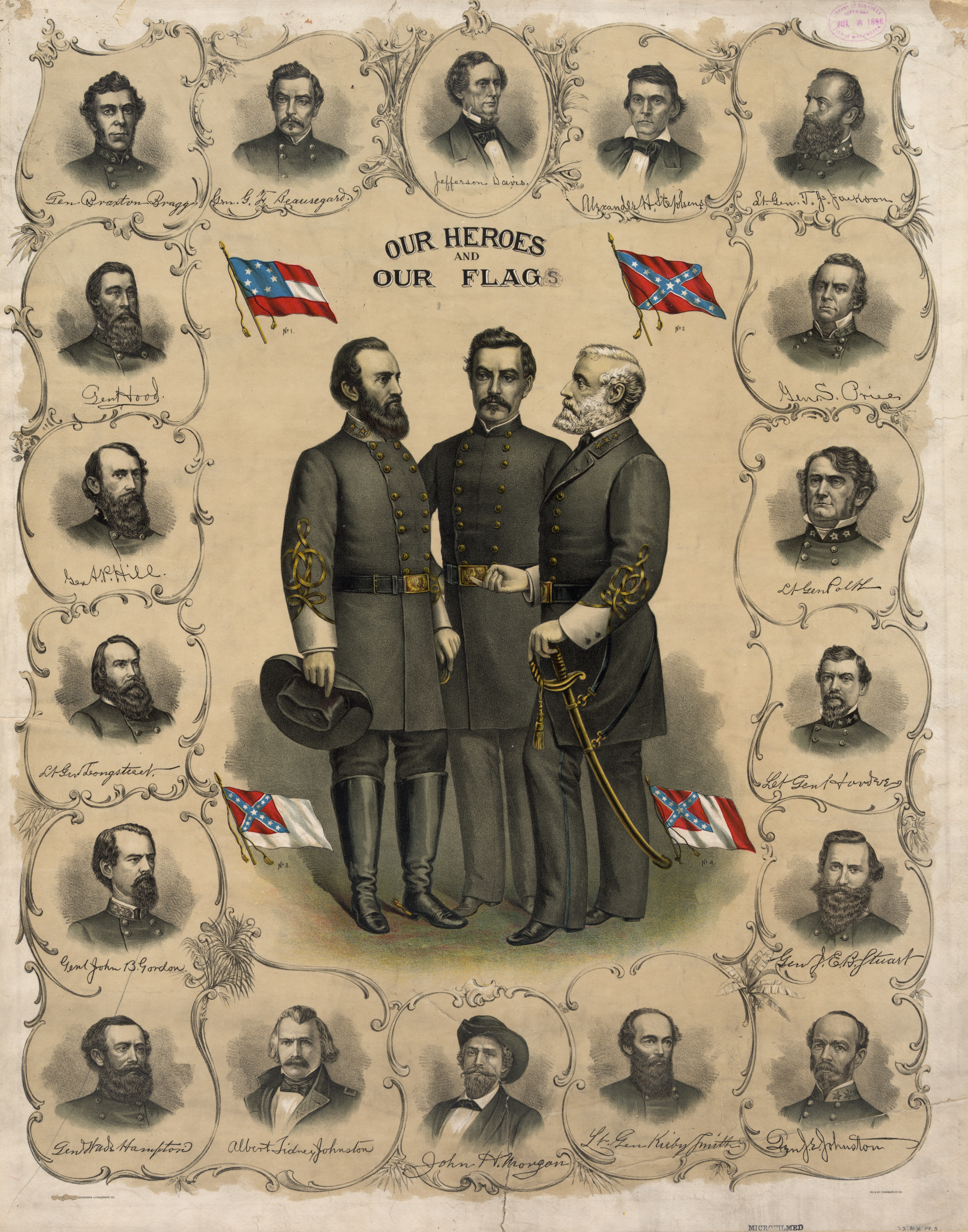
1896 lithograph of the three Confederate national flags and the battle flag

Designed by William Porcher Miles, the chairman of the Flag and Seal Committee of the Confederate Provisional Congress, the flag now generally known as the "Confederate flag" was first proposed and rejected as the national flag in 1861. However, the design was adopted as a battle flag by the Army of Northern Virginia (ANV) under General Robert E. Lee and grew in popularity throughout the Confederacy.

To conserve material, the ANV changed Miles' design from a rectangle to a square for the battle flag. The rectangular version, similar to the battle flag used by the Army of Tennessee under General Joseph E. Johnston, is the most popular today and common in modern reproductions. Despite never having historically represented the Confederacy as a country nor been officially recognized as one of its flags, it is commonly referred to as "the Confederate flag" and has become a widely recognized symbol of the American South. It is also called the "rebel flag", "Dixie flag", "Confederate battle flag", or "Southern cross". Opponents of the flag have referred to it as the "Dixie swastika". Due to misconceptions of this design being the Confederacy's national flag, it is often incorrectly called the "Stars and Bars" after the original national design. The self-declared Confederate exclave of Town Line, New York, lacking a genuine Confederate flag, flew a version of this flag prior to its 1946 vote to ceremonially rejoin the Union.

== Revival and controversy ==
During the "memorial period" that ran from the late 19th century through the 1920s, the use of Confederate flags broadened and became the symbolic embodiment of the Lost Cause. The Confederate battle flag was added to the state flags of three former Confederate states. The flag of Mississippi included the battle flag from 1894 until 2020, and the flag of Georgia did from 1956 until 2003. The 50th anniversary reunion at Gettysburg in 1913 was a turning point in obtaining national acceptance of the flag and other Confederate symbols. The flag appears prominently in The Birth of a Nation (1915), a highly successful and influential film which favourably depicts the Ku Klux Klan, a white supremacist group. Woodrow Wilson made this the first ever film to air at the White House during his term as president. Margaret Mitchell's novel, Gone with the Wind, led to a brief but intense period of nostalgia for the Old South during which the Confederate flag appeared widely. In the film adaptation, the flag flutters over a scene of vast carnage.

=== Military use ===
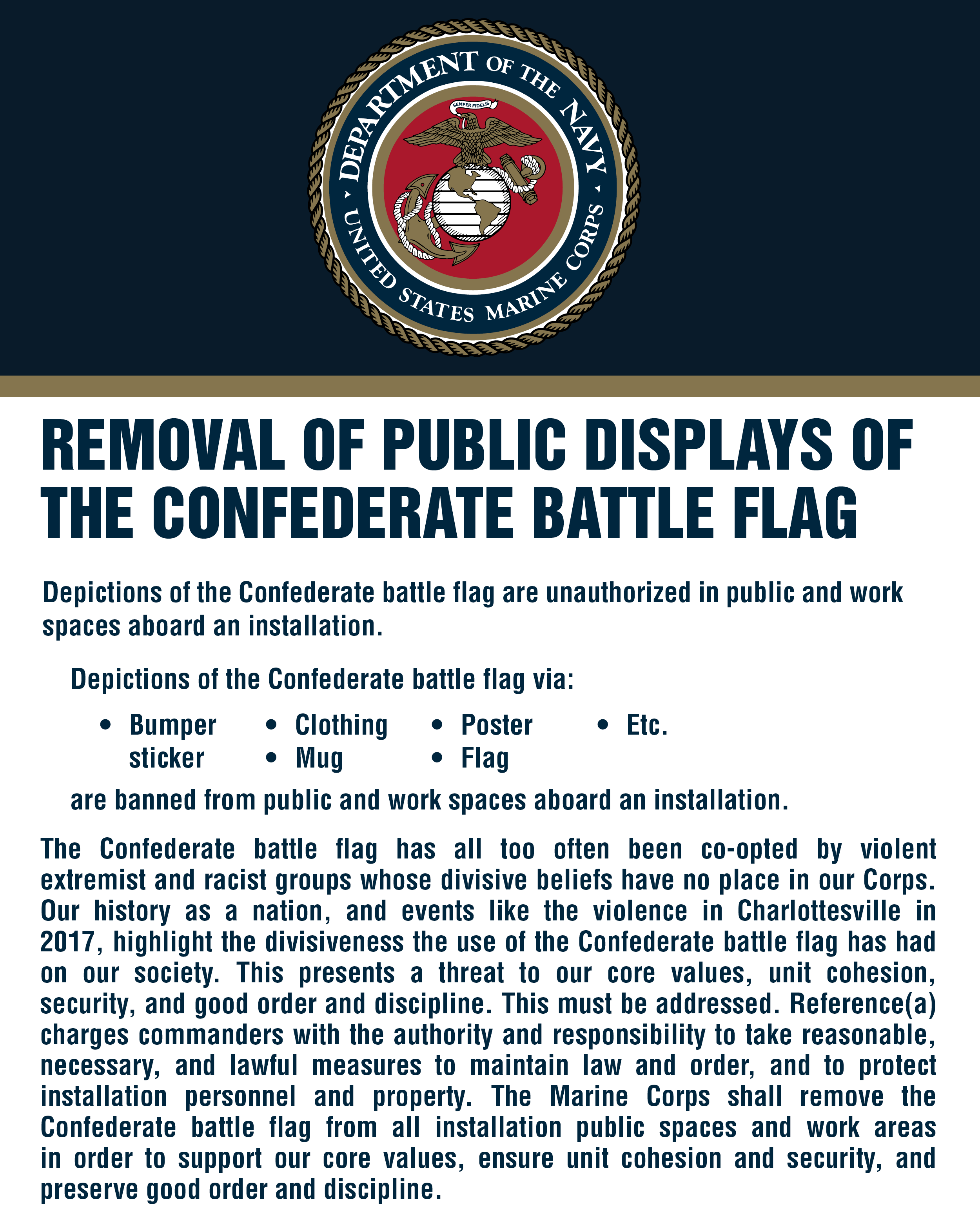
Notification to remove all depictions of the Confederate Battle Flag from U.S. Marine Corps installations

During World War II, several U.S. military units using Southern nicknames or composed largely of Southerners made the flag their unofficial emblem. Some soldiers carried Confederate flags into battle. After the Battle of Okinawa, a Confederate flag was raised over Shuri Castle by a Marine from the self-styled "Rebel Company" (Company A of the 1st Battalion, 5th Marines). It was visible for miles and was taken down after three days on the orders of General Simon B. Buckner Jr. (son of Confederate general Simon Buckner Sr.), who stated that it was inappropriate as "Americans from all over are involved in this battle". The regulation replaced it with 48-star flag of the United States. By the end of the war, the use of the Confederate flag in the military was relatively rare. In 1952, Destroyer Division 122 (known as the "Dixie Division" because its four commanders were from the South) was ordered to stop flying the Confederate flag.

Following the May 2020 murder of George Floyd and ensuing protests, Commandant of the Marine Corps David Berger directed Marine Corps leaders to remove all Confederate-related items from all the Corps' bases throughout the world. The entire U.S. Navy soon followed suit, disallowing the exhibition of the Confederate battle flag in all public places on installations, ships, and aircraft. After the branch-specific bans, Secretary of Defense Mark Esper issued guidance in July that effectively forbade the display of the battle flag by all uniformed American military personnel and at all US military installations around the world.

=== Political groups ===
The 1948 Dixiecrat political party extensively used Confederate symbols, including the battle flag, and it contributed to the flag's mid-20th-century re-popularization. According to historian John Coski, segregationists utilized Confederate symbols since both they and the Confederates had similar goals—opposition to efforts to "change the South's racial status quo". As a result, Coski stated that "There could be no more fitting opposition than the Confederate battle flag."

In Georgia, the Confederate battle flag was reintroduced as an element of the state flag in 1956, just two years after the Supreme Court decision Brown v. Board of Education. It was considered by many to be a protest against school desegregation. It was also raised at the University of Mississippi during protests against the integration of schools.

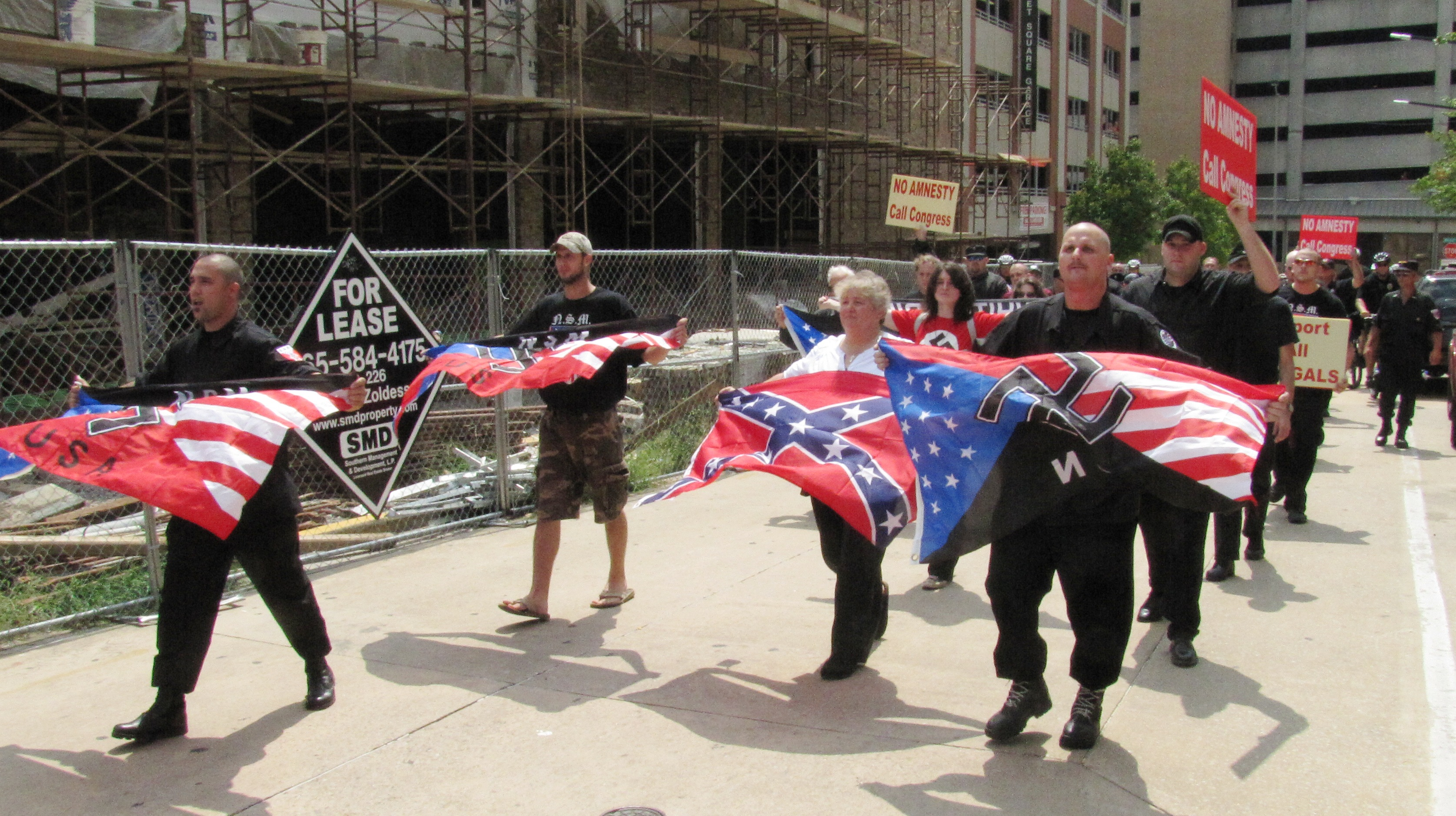
Members of the Detroit-based National Socialist Movement marching at Market Square in Knoxville, Tennessee in 2010

While some supporters of the flag's continued use claim that it is merely a symbol of Southern heritage and ancestry, or that it represents the cultural traditions that distinguish southern states from the United States at large, white supremacist organizations such as the Ku Klux Klan have continued to use the "southern cross" as a symbol. Such groups often display Confederate flags alongside others like the Nazi-era Reichskriegsflagge or the Blood Drop Cross, contributing to public perception of the Confederate flag as a hate symbol.

Historian John Coski noted that the Sons of Confederate Veterans, the "most visible, active, and effective defender of the flag", "carried forward into the twenty-first century, virtually unchanged, the Lost Cause historical interpretations and ideological vision formulated at the turn of the twentieth." Coski wrote concerning "the flag wars of the late twentieth century":

From the ... early 1950s, SCV officials defended the integrity of the battle flag against trivialization and against those who insisted that its display was unpatriotic or racist. SCV spokesmen reiterated the consistent argument that the South fought a legitimate war for independence, not a war to defend slavery. The ascendant "Yankee" view of history falsely vilified the South and led people to misinterpret the battle flag.

The allied United Daughters of the Confederacy and other historical societies also used the flag as one of their symbols.

From an opposite political perspective, both the Southern Student Organizing Committee and the Young Patriots Organization (the latter among Southern migrants in Chicago), were 1960/70s New Left anti-racist movements that attempted to reappropriate the Confederate flag in their symbolism.

In Petersburg, Virginia, the Ladies Memorial Association of Petersburg in 1909 had a Tiffany stained-glass Confederate flag included in a window over the door to the former Blandford Church.

=== Religious groups ===
At its annual meeting in 2016, the Southern Baptist Convention passed a resolution calling for Southern Baptist churches to stop displaying the Confederate flag, as a "sign of solidarity of the whole Body of Christ."

=== Public opinion (2011–2021) ===
The Confederate flag is a controversial symbol for many Americans today. A 2011 Pew Research Center poll revealed that 30% of Americans had a "negative reaction" when "they saw the Confederate flag displayed". According to the same poll, 9% of Americans had a positive reaction. A majority (58%) did not react. Among black Americans, 41% had a negative reaction, 10% had a positive reaction, and 45% had no reaction. A similar poll taken in 2015 revealed little change from 2011.

In an October 2013 YouGov poll, a plurality (38%) of those polled disapproved of displaying the flag in public places. In the same poll, a plurality (44%) of those asked viewed the flag as a symbol of racism, with 24% viewing it as exclusively racist and 20% viewing it as both racist and symbolic of pride in the region. 35% viewed it exclusively as a symbol of regional pride.

In a national survey in 2015 across all races, 57% of Americans believed that the Confederate flag represented Southern pride rather than racism. A similar poll in 2000 had a nearly identical result of 59%. However, poll results from only the South yielded a completely different result: 75% of Southern whites described the flag as a symbol of pride. Conversely, 75% of Southern blacks said the flag symbolized racism.

Another poll, administered by The Economist/YouGov after racially motivated violence in Charlottesville in August 2017, showed that by a 5% margin—43% to 38%—the Confederate flag was viewed as a symbol of Southern pride rather than racism. However, participants of color were 32% more likely than white participants to see it as a sign of racism. In July 2020, over a month after the George Floyd incident, Quinnipiac released a poll showing that the majority of both Southerners and Americans in general now viewed the Confederate flag as a racist symbol rather than one of heritage, with 55% of Southerners associating the Confederate flag with racism compared to 36% who said the flag a symbol of Southern pride. Closely followed were Americans in general, 56% of whom said the flag was a symbol of racism, with 35% saying it was a symbol of southern pride.

This contrasted with polling conducted by Morning Consult and Politico right after the George Floyd incident, which showed nearly the opposite—47 percent saw the Confederate flag as a symbol of Southern pride, and 36 percent saw it as racist.

=== Historical and modern meaning ===
Confederate flag made out of flowers at the Confederate Statue in Jasper, Alabama, 2010

As a result of these varying perceptions, there have been several political controversies surrounding using the Confederate battle flag in Southern state flags, at sporting events, at Southern universities, and on public buildings. In their study of Confederate symbols in the contemporary Southern United States, the Southern political scientists James Michael Martinez, William Donald Richardson, and Ron McNinch-Su wrote:

The battle flag was never adopted by the Confederate Congress, never flew over any state capitols during the Confederacy, and was never officially used by Confederate veterans' groups. The flag probably would have been relegated to Civil War museums if it had not been resurrected by the resurgent KKK and used by Southern Dixiecrats during the 1948 presidential election.

Southern historian Gordon Rhea further wrote in 2011:

It is no accident that Confederate symbols have been the mainstay of white supremacist organizations, from the Ku Klux Klan to the skinheads. They did not appropriate the Confederate battle flag simply because it was pretty. They picked it because it was the flag of a nation dedicated to their ideals: 'that the negro is not equal to the white man'. The Confederate flag, we are told, represents heritage, not hate. But why should we celebrate a heritage grounded in hate, a heritage whose self-avowed reason for existence was the exploitation and debasement of a sizeable segment of its population?

Symbols of the Confederacy remain a contentious issue across the United States and their civic placement has been debated vigorously in many southern U.S. state legislatures since the early 1990s, such as the effort that led to the replacement of Georgia's flag in 2001. Supporters have labeled attempts to display the flag as an exercise of free speech in response to bans in some schools and universities, but have not always been successful in court when attempting to use this justification.

In a 2001 essay, "Old Times There Are Best Forgotten", Emory University professor Lucas Carpenter observed that "Contemporary Confederate sympathizers want free use of Confederate symbolism because they say it represents their 'heritage.' It does, of course, but it is heritage chiefly characterized by its brutal oppression of the enslaved and their 'free' descendants. The most important thing to know about the South is that until recently it was a region ruled by slavery and apartheid."

The Anti-Defamation League says the flag is "still used by non-extremists, especially in the South, as a symbol of Southern heritage or history."

=== Popularity outside the Southern U.S. ===
The flag has found popularity in places far outside of the former Confederacy, especially in rural areas in the United States.

Muriel Hazel Wright's "14 flags of Oklahoma", inspired by the six flags of Texas, flew at the 1964 New York World's Fair, and were moved to a plaza at the State Capitol in 1966, with Wright's Stars-and-Bars replaced by the battle flag. A 1988 joint legislative resolution specified that the flags be restored after imminent renovations, but in 1989 governor Henry Bellmon provided only 13 flags, arguing that the legislature would have to specify which Confederate flag to fly. In 2003 the legislature agreed to move the display to the Oklahoma History Center and fly the Stars and Bars rather than the battle flag.

==== Pacific Northwest ====
When researching his ethnography of white Americans, Searching for Whitopia, scholar Rich Benjamin kept a notepad while traveling the Pacific Northwest. "I remember driving through swaths of Washington and Oregon and seeing a lot of Confederate flags", Benjamin explained to journalist Matthew Novak. "There are a lot of refugees from the South who seem attracted to Oregon not because they're racists, but because Oregon has a racial homogeneity and a conservatism and a gun culture that they really appreciate." The Pacific Northwest offers a cultural collision between the Confederate flag, other emblems of racism, and its new technological profit hubs.

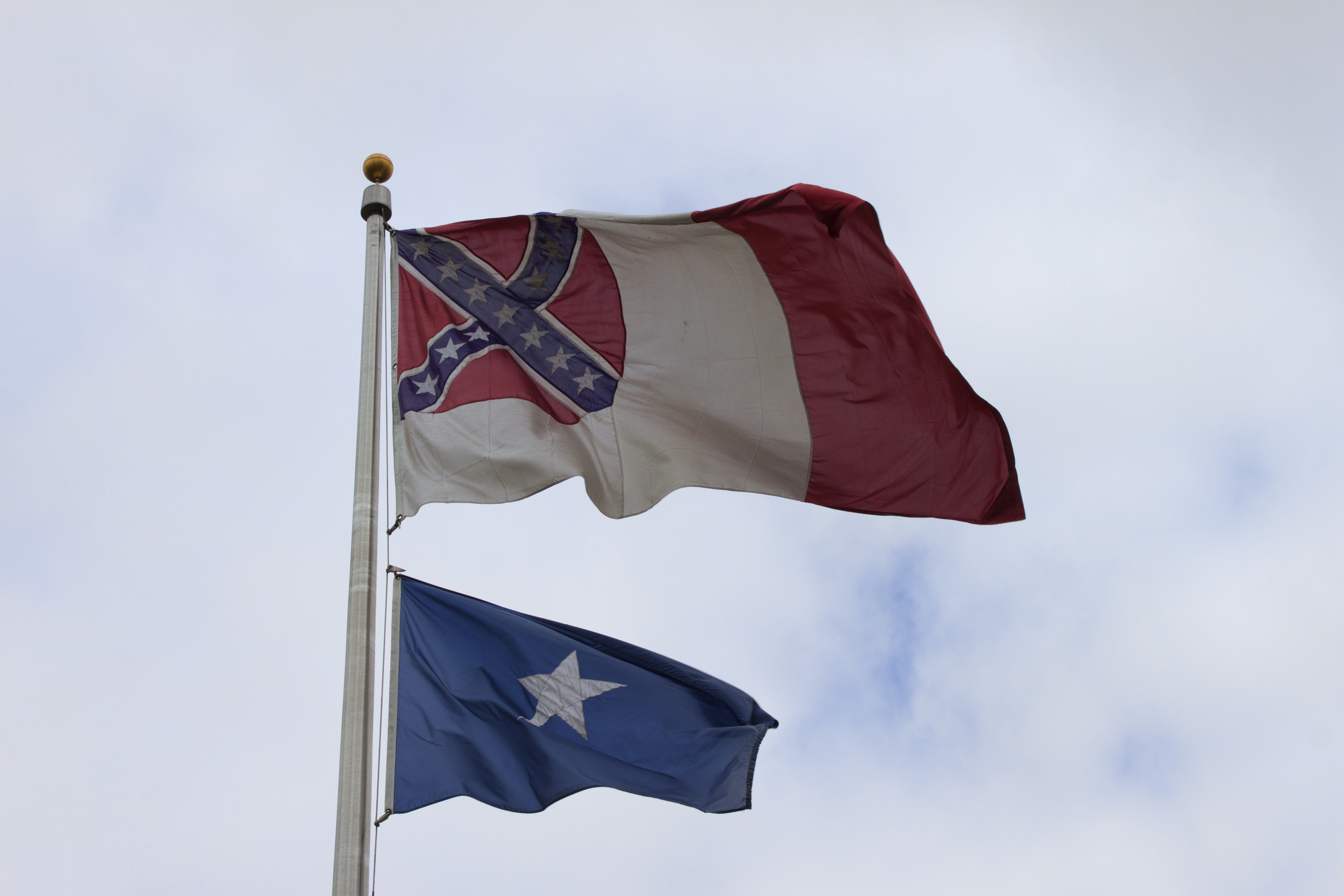
3rd Flag of the Confederacy and the Bonnie Blue Flag at Jefferson Davis Park, Washington, 2018

Calls for the removal of Confederate flags from Jefferson Davis Park in southwestern Washington state began in 2015, after the Charleston church shooting, by Rev. Marva Edwards, the president of Vancouver's NAACP chapter. Even though the markers and flags are located on private property, they are and were intended to be highly visible (to all cars traveling Interstate 5). Their visibility, and events in other parts of the nation regarding Confederate memorials, still make these symbols a local focus of strong emotions, especially in the aftermath of the white nationalist Unite the Right rally August 11–12, 2017.

==== San Francisco City Hall ====
Eighteen flags fly at Civic Center Plaza in front of the San Francisco City Hall, each representing important events in United States history. These include several related to the American Revolution, along with the original flags of the Republic of California and the Republic of Texas. It also included the Confederate flag, but it was removed in 1984 as a result of protests by members of the Spartacist League, who repeatedly tore down the flag.

==== At European far-right events ====
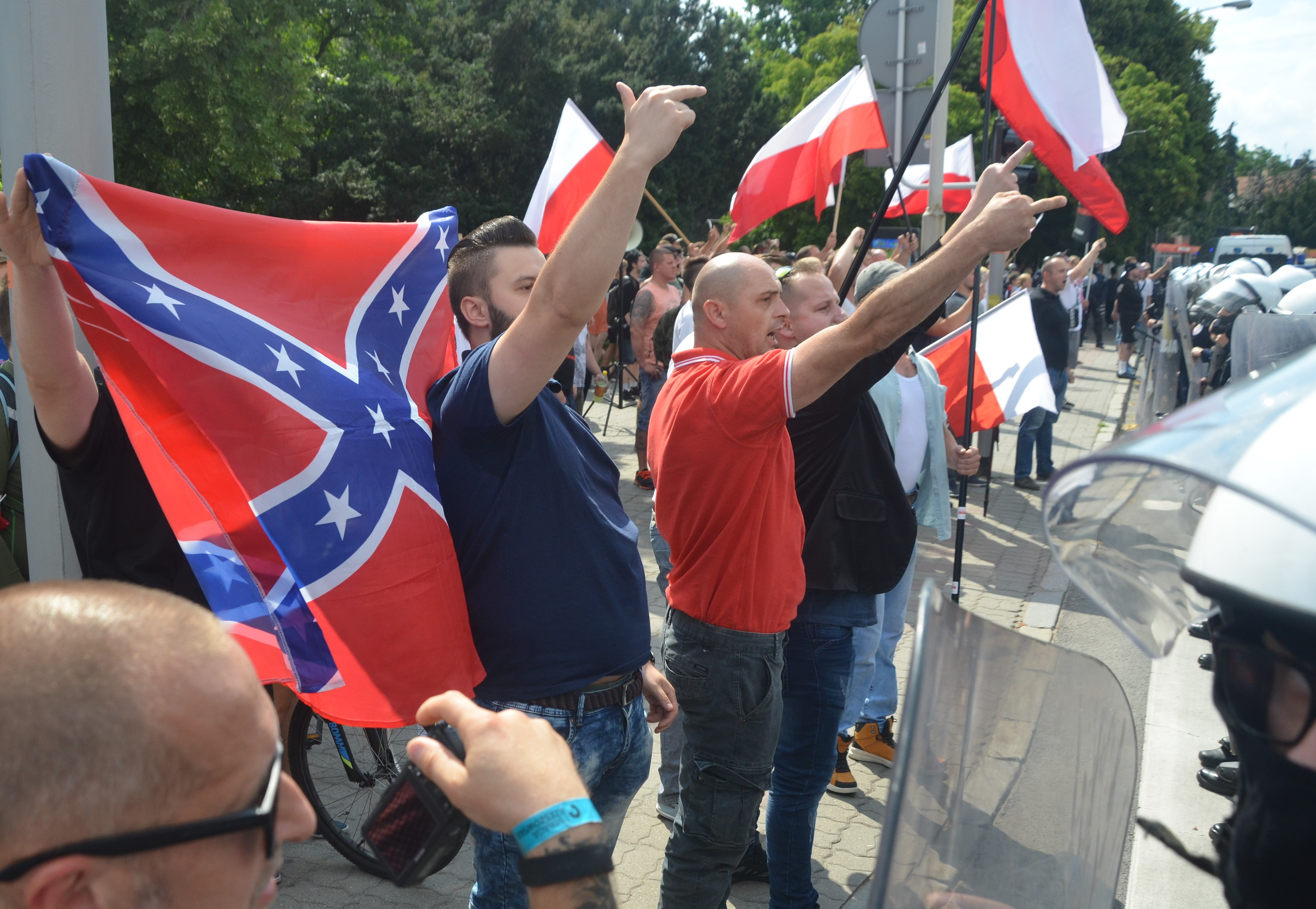
Anti-LGBT protesters in Rzeszów, Poland, in 2019

The Confederate battle flag is sometimes displayed in Europe at far-right group gatherings. The flag is popular with neo-Nazis, particularly in Germany, where displaying Nazi symbols is a crime.

==== "Southern pride" in Italy's football stadiums ====
The Washington Post reporter Adam Taylor, in a 2015 article about the use of Confederate flags in Italy, explained that the first time Napoli S.S.C. supporters were noticed flying the flag abroad was during their quarterfinal match of the UEFA Champions League against English side Chelsea in 2012. He quoted an explanation given several years before to historian Don Harrison Doyle and reported in Divided Nations (2002) by a professor of American Literature in Naples: "We too are a defeated people. Once we were a rich and independent country, and then they came from the North and conquered us and took our wealth and power away to Rome."

Writer Vladimiro Bottone, in an article of July 15, 2004 on Naples newspaper Corriere del Mezzogiorno, adds that stadium is the "place [where] the first virulent and explicit opposition between North and South of the post-war period was made visible in a mass dimension" [...]. For Napoli supporters, [...] "Napoli is what it could have been if the robbery of Savoy sneaky team (aiming at Juventus, main team of Turin, town of the Savoy, the Italian Royal family, ndr) was not able to perpetrate its damage, to the point of colonizing the Belpaese football with the violence of fraud, thus distorting the development of what should be a fair competition between territories."

=== In film and television ===
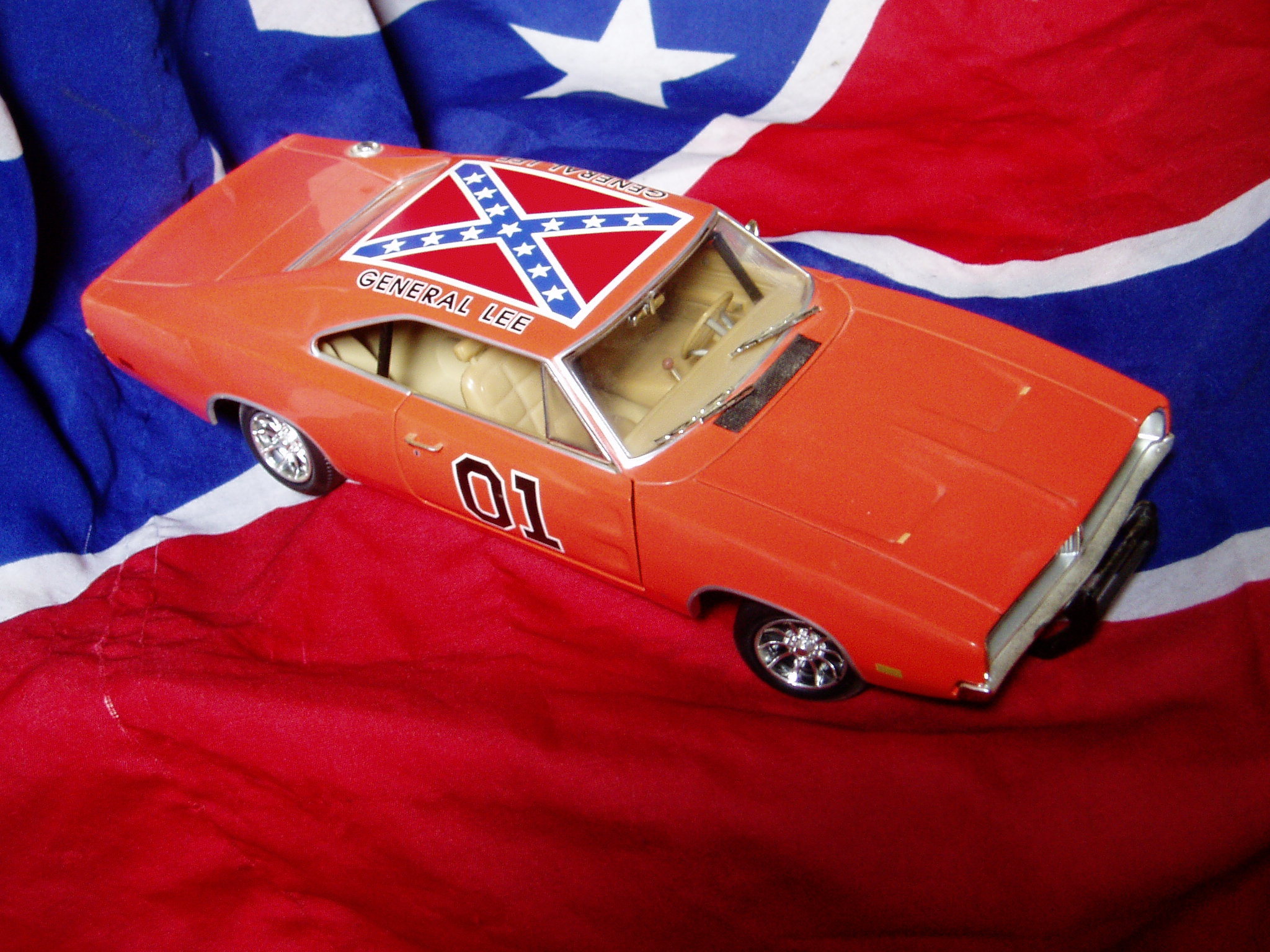
A scale model of "General Lee" from the TV series The Dukes of Hazzard.

Media that does not reference the civil war in a historical context (such as media set in the time period of the civil war, museum displays, or depictions of reenactments).

The 1989 film Shag has a character wearing a flag bikini.

The 2005 film The Dukes of Hazzard and its 2007 prequel The Dukes of Hazzard: The Beginning both feature the General Lee car from the TV series complete with Confederate flag paint job.

=== Use by musicians ===
The Southern rock band Lynyrd Skynyrd has made heavy use of the flag. In 2012, the band attempted to distance itself from the flag because of its divisive history as a symbol of racism. In an interview with CNN, Gary Rossington stated, "We just had it in the beginning because we're Southern and that was our image back in the '70s and late '60s. But I think people through the years, people like the KKK and the skinheads... kidnapped the Dixie rebel flag, the Southern tradition and the heritage of the soldiers, you know, that's what it was about. We didn't want that to go to our fans or show the image like we agreed with any of the race stuff or any of the bad things." Two weeks later, after backlash from fans, they resumed using it, with Rossington stating on the band's website, "We know what the Dixie flag represents and its heritage; the Civil War was fought over States' rights."

Until July 2015, the metal band Pantera sold numerous items that featured the flag in its official online store. Founding member Dimebag Darrell, who was shot and killed in 2004, used a Dean ML guitar customized with the flag covering the guitar's body. As of July 2015, singer Phil Anselmo distanced himself from using the flag.

The hip-hop group Lil Jon and the East Side Boyz used the flag (burning) on the cover of its 2001 album Put Yo Hood Up, as well as in the music video for its single "Bia' Bia'".

The rockabilly musician Ray Campi played an upright bass with a customized image of the flag on the back of the instrument. At some point prior to 2009, he changed the image to the Texas flag.

The Southern rock musician Tom Petty used the Confederate flag in his 1985 Southern Accents tour, tying its imagery to the lead character in his song "Rebels". In 2015, he disclaimed his use of the flag as "downright stupid," saying "It's like how a swastika looks to a Jewish person."

Despite hailing from Michigan, the singer Kid Rock prominently displayed the Confederate flag on his tours starting with his 2001 album Cocky, but by 2011, he had quietly abandoned his use of the flag.

The instrumental guitarist Duane Eddy, along with his backing band, "the Rebels", used the Confederate flag and symbolism during his early career.

Billy Idol wore clothing with the flag until 1990. That year he was hospitalized and vowed to never wear it again after a Black employee tending to him explained his feelings on the flag.

When performing live prior to their initial breakup, American proto-punk group MC5 would often drape their amplifiers with flags, including the Confederate flag. This was likely done to give off a rebellious tone rather than glorification of the Confederacy, especially considering their vocal advocacy for racial equality as well as dedicated support for the White Panther Party. Furthermore, longtime band photographer Leni Sinclair publicly maintained in 2015 that "they were not racist, they were ignorant" in regards to the matter.

=== End of use on Twitch ===
In December 2020, Twitch announced a new policy regarding harassment and hateful content, to take effect on January 22, 2021, aimed at better protecting marginalized users of the service. While the new policy is stricter, Twitch stated that it also includes a larger sliding scale of remedies or punishments to better deal with edge cases, such as temporarily blocking a channel for a short time rather than a full ban. The new policy includes a ban on imagery containing the Confederate flag.

=== University of Mississippi statue ===
On February 16, 2014, University of Mississippi campus police discovered that the James Meredith memorial statue, erected in October 2006, had been draped with a pre-2003 Georgia state flag (containing the Confederate flag) and a rope tied into a noose around the neck of the statue. Meredith, an alumnus of the university, was the first African American to attend the school in October 1962. The Federal Bureau of Investigation and the Oxford, Mississippi Police Department conducted an investigation shortly after the event which led to the arrest of Graeme Phillip Harris, a former freshman at the university. Harris pleaded guilty in June 2015 to a misdemeanor for using threat of force to intimidate African American students and employees. U.S. District Judge Michael P. Mills sentenced Harris to six months in prison, followed by twelve months of supervision after release. A second student, Austin Reed Edenfield, was sentenced to a year of probation in addition to 50 hours of community service. A third student involved has not been charged.

=== House bill banning the flag at Veterans Administration cemeteries ===
On May 19, 2016, the United States House of Representatives voted 265–159 to ban the display of Confederate flags on flagpoles at Veterans Administration cemeteries. The ban was contained in an amendment (House Amendment 592, 114th Congress) to House bill 2822, an appropriations bill. The author of the amendment was California congressman Jared Huffman, who stated that the flag represented "racism, slavery and division."

In June 2016, Republicans in Congress attempted to attach an amendment to a bill funding the fight against the Zika virus epidemic that would have reversed the flag ban. It was one of several provisions that Republicans had attached, including an amendment cutting Planned Parenthood funding. Senate Democrats blocked the bill through filibuster.

=== Six Flags Over Texas ===
In August 2017, in response to the controversial Unite the Right rally that was held in Charlottesville, the park Six Flags Over Texas replaced its six flags (which had included the first Confederate flag) with six American flags. A representative of the park told KXAS-TV, "We always choose to focus on celebrating the things that unite us versus those that divide us. As such, we have changed the flag displays in our park to feature American flags."

=== State of New York prohibition ===
On December 15, 2020, the State of New York passed a law "to prohibit the sale or display of hate symbols in public buildings and public grounds including state and local fairs, unless serving an educational or historical purpose." The law defines hate symbols to "include, but not be limited to, symbols of white supremacy, Neo-Nazi ideology or the Battle Flag of the Confederacy".

=== United States Capitol attack ===
During the January 6 United States Capitol attack, several rioters carried Confederate battle flags. This was the first time in U.S. history where the Confederate flag entered the Capitol building in an act of insurrection.

=== Great American State Fair ===
A display of the Confederate flag appeared at the North Carolina pavilion at the Great American State Fair that was intended to celebrate the United States Semiquincentennial. The display was removed after a video showed it appeared on display at the exhibit.

== Official usage in Southern U.S. states ==
In the years after the end of the American Civil War, many former slave states that were members of the Confederacy adopted new state flags during the war. In their new flags' designs, motifs were used in the Confederacy's flags, such as the St. Andrew's cross. In the case of Mississippi, Florida, and Alabama these new state flags were adopted around the same time that new Jim Crow segregation laws were being enacted. These laws, combined with poll taxes, literacy tests, and extrajudicial violence such as lynchings, disenfranchised African American voters for the next ninety years. According to historian John M. Coski:

The flag changes in Mississippi, Alabama, and Florida coincided with the passage of formal Jim Crow segregation laws throughout the South. Four years before Mississippi incorporated a Confederate battle flag into its state flag, its constitutional convention passed pioneering provisions to 'reform' politics by effectively disenfranchising most African Americans.

=== State flags ===
==== Alabama ====
The Flag of Alabama

The current Flag of Alabama (the second in Alabama state history) was adopted by Act 383 of the Alabama state legislature on February 16, 1895:

The flag of the State of Alabama shall be a crimson cross of St. Andrew on a field of white. The bars forming the cross shall be not less than six inches broad, and must extend diagonally across the flag from side to side. – (Code 1896, §3751; Code 1907, §2058; Code 1923, §2995; Code 1940, T. 55, §5.)

An article in the October 1917 National Geographic magazine posited that "the purpose in enacting the state flag law was to preserve in permanent form some of the distinctive features of the Confederate Battle Flag."

Meanwhile, the formal Coat of arms of Alabama directly employs the battle jack as part of its shield.

==== Arkansas ====
The Flag of Arkansas

The flag of Arkansas contains four blue stars within a diamond representing the four countries that historically controlled the territory; one of these stars represents the Confederate States of America. The design of the border around the white diamond evokes the saltire found on the Confederate battle flag. In 2019, the Arkansas legislature did not approve a bill that would have redefined the star as referring to Native Americans.

==== Florida ====
The Flag of Florida

The current flag of Florida, adopted by popular referendum in 1900, with minor changes in 1985, contains the Cross of Burgundy. It is believed that the cross was added in memory of, and showing support for, the Confederacy. The addition of the cross was proposed by Governor Francis P. Fleming, a former Confederate soldier, who was strongly committed to racial segregation. However, some historians believe the flag dates back to the original flag the Spanish flew over Florida in the 16th century.

==== Georgia ====
Recent flags of Georgia

In 1956 the Georgia state flag was redesigned to incorporate the Confederate battle flag. Following protests over this aspect of the design in the 1990s by the NAACP (National Association for the Advancement of Colored People) and other groups, efforts began in the Georgia General Assembly to remove the battle flag from the state flag's design. These efforts succeeded in January 2001 when Georgia governor Roy Barnes introduced a design that, though continuing to depict the battle flag, significantly reduced its prominence.

The following year, amidst dwindling demands for the return of the 1956 design ("battle flag" version) and lesser opposing demands for the continued use of the new "Barnes" design, the Georgia General Assembly redesigned the flag yet again; it adopted a "compromise" design using the 13-star First National Flag of the Confederacy (the "Stars and Bars"), combined with a simplified version of the state seal placed within the circle of 13 stars on the flag's canton.

The city flag of Trenton, Georgia, was adopted in 2001 as a protest following the change of the state flag of Georgia. The flag has been controversial because it incorporates the Confederate battle flag.

==== Mississippi ====
The Flag of Mississippi that was used until 2020. It is the most recent state flag to have directly employed the Confederate battle flag symbolism, not considering the existing stars-and-bars banner of Georgia.

The Confederate battle flag became a part of the flag of Mississippi in 1894. In 1906, the flag statutes were omitted by error from the state's new legal code, leaving Mississippi without an official flag. The omission was not discovered until 1993 when a lawsuit filed by the NAACP regarding the flag was being reviewed by the Supreme Court of Mississippi. In 2000, Governor Ronnie Musgrove issued an executive order making the flag official in February 2001. After continued controversy, the decision was turned over to citizens of the state, who, on April 17, 2001, voted 2:1 to keep the Confederate battle flag a part of the state flag.

Following the Charleston church shooting in June 2015 and subsequent discussion of the flying of the Confederate battle flag at the South Carolina State House, Speaker of the Mississippi House of Representatives Philip Gunn publicly called for the removal of the Confederate battle flag from the flag of Mississippi.

Renewed focus on race relations following the murder of George Floyd prompted the removal of many Confederate symbols throughout the country, and in Mississippi, legislators attempted to revive a bill that would modify the state flag to eliminate its depiction of the battle flag. On June 27, 2020, the Mississippi Legislature voted to suspend rules in order to debate and vote on a bill to address the flag issue. On June 28, both houses passed a bill to abolish the state flag, remove the flag from public institutions within 15 days of its enactment, and create a nine-member commission to design a replacement that would exclude the Confederate battle flag and include the motto "In God We Trust". Governor Tate Reeves signed the bill into law on June 30, 2020.

==== North Carolina ====
The 1861–1885 Flag of North Carolina

The first flag of North Carolina, which was adopted in 1861, had two ribbons. On one of the ribbons is emblazoned "May 20th, 1775". The other one had the inscription "May 20, 1861".

The new flag, which was adopted in 1885, has a modified design with other colors, and the date of the North Carolina's secession was replaced by "April 12, 1776".

==== Tennessee ====
The Flag of Tennessee

The current flag of Tennessee was designed by Colonel Lee Roy Reeves, an attorney and officer of the Tennessee National Guard. The flag was officially adopted in 1905, replacing the original post-Civil War state flag. Although the symbolism is reported as referencing only the state of Tennessee, its color scheme and design evoke the Confederacy's flags. The red field and blue charge with white fimbriation evoke the Confederate battle flag. The placement of the vertical bar at the fly of the field evokes the Third National Flag of the Confederacy. The language the designer used to describe the three central stars ('the indissoluble trinity', albeit regarding the three Grand Divisions of Tennessee) and their central placement evokes the cross of St. Andrew of the Confederate battle flag. Vexillologist Steven A. Knowlton believes the relationship between the current Tennessee state flag and the flags of the Confederacy is one of "pragmatic unity" with a "deeper symbolic recognition" linking it to the Confederacy. While there is no explicit evidence of any intention on the part of the designer to create a link, Knowlton believes many Tennesseans have perceived and continue to perceive a link, given the cultural and historical context. Christopher Ingraham, citing Knowlton, considers this a case of "plausible deniability" and that the flag is one of seven state flags visually continuing the legacy of the Confederacy.

=== State symbol ===
Stone Mountain, Georgia, is a "monument to the Confederacy" that was paid for and is owned by the state of Georgia. Stone Mountain Park opened 100 years to the day after the assassination of Abraham Lincoln. It is the most visited destination in the state of Georgia.

Four flags of the Confederacy are flown at Stone Mountain. In addition, the Stone Mountain Memorial Lawn "contains...thirteen terraces — one for each Confederate state.... Each terrace flies the flag that the state flew as member of the Confederacy."

=== State seals ===
The first Confederate flag and five other nations that have had sovereignty over Texas (Spain, France, Mexico, Republic of Texas, and the United States) appear above one of the side entrances to the Texas State Capitol. They also appear on the reverse of the Seal of Texas, which is the subject of a floor mosaic in the Capitol Extension. The seal's reverse was proposed by the Daughters of the Republic of Texas and approved by the Texas Legislature and governor in 1961, then modified in 1991.

The coat of arms of Alabama

The Alabama coat of arms features the Confederate battle flag's saltire in its design. Like Texas, the saltire on the coat of arms represents one of the five countries that have held sovereignty over part or all of Alabama.

The shield of the Confederacy was found in the rotunda of the Florida Capitol, together with those of France, Spain, Great Britain, and the United States—all of them treated equally as "nations" of which Florida was a part. The five flags "that have flown in Florida" were included on the official Senate seal, displayed prominently in the Senate chambers, on its stationery, and throughout the Capitol. On October 19, 2015, the Senate agreed to change the seal to remove the Confederate battle flag. The new (2016) Senate seal has only the flags of the United States and Florida.

=== Vehicle license plates ===
In Alabama, Georgia, Louisiana, Mississippi, South Carolina, and Tennessee, vehicle owners can request a state-issued license plate featuring the Sons of Confederate Veterans logo, which incorporates the square Confederate battle flag.

In 1998, a North Carolina appellate court upheld the issuance of such license plates in the case Sons of Confederate v. DMV, noting: "We are aware of the sensitivity of many of our citizens to the display of the Confederate flag. Whether the display of the Confederate flag on state-issued license plates represents sound public policy is not an issue presented to this Court in this case. That is an issue for our General Assembly."

In 2015, the dispute over Texas vanity plates that would have displayed the logo ended up before the United States Supreme Court. In its decision in Walker v. Texas Division, Sons of Confederate Veterans, the court ruled that license plates are governmental speech, so the government may decide what to have printed on them. Texas's refusal to issue flag-emblazoned license plates therefore didn't violate petitioners' right to free speech.

In 2015, Virginia recalled its vanity plates with the Confederate flag emblem pictured within the logo of the Sons of Confederate Veterans. To holders of SCV plates, the state mailed replacements without the emblem. The old design with the emblem was invalidated, and driving with such Virginia tags was made a misdemeanor similar to driving an unlicensed vehicle. However, in October 2015, an SCV legal team tried fighting the ban in court.

=== Display at the South Carolina State Capitol ===
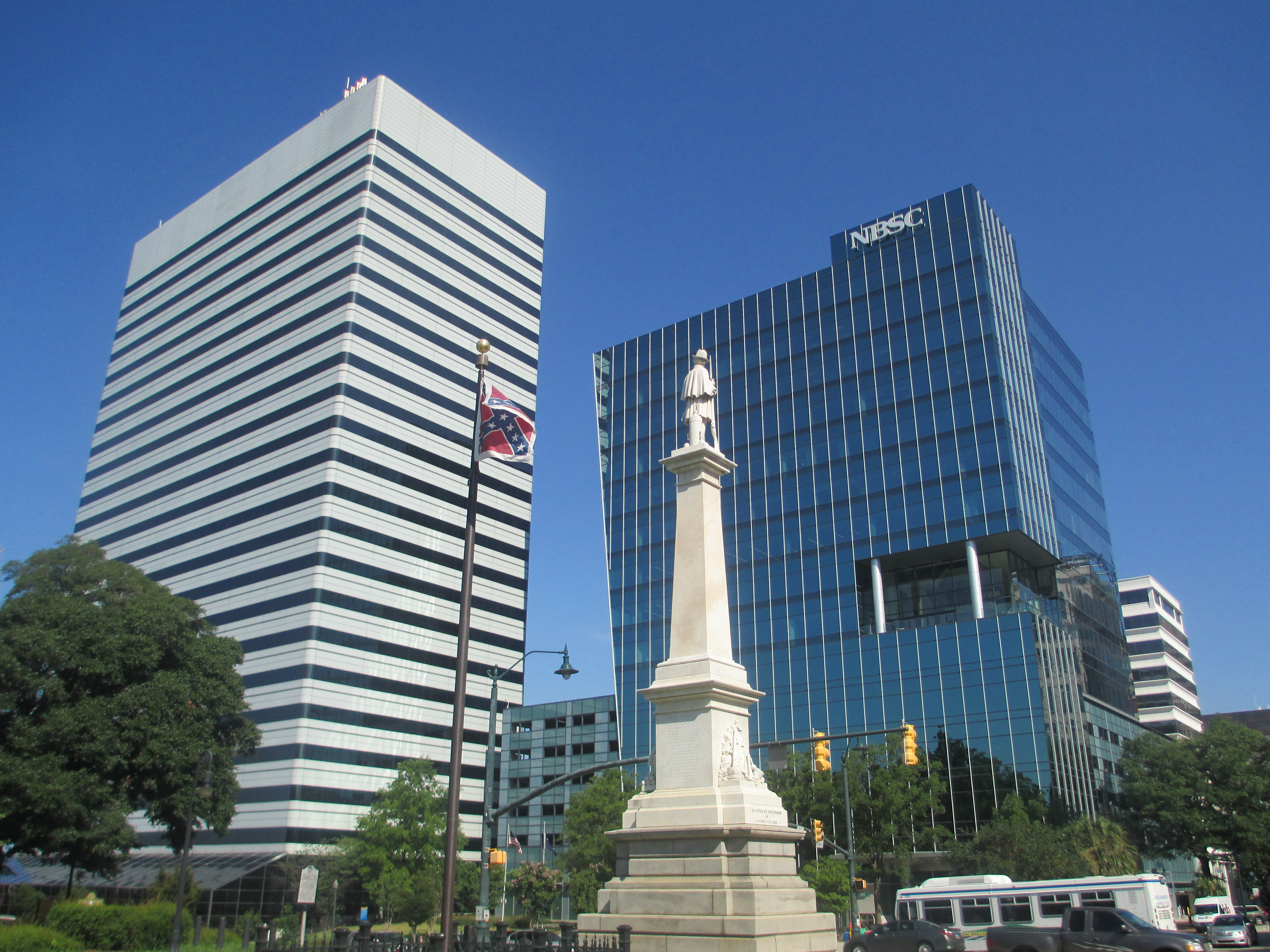
The flag flying at the South Carolina Confederate Monument in Columbia in 2012

The Confederate battle flag was raised over the State House on April 11, 1961, at the request of Representative John May ostensibly as a part of opening celebrations of the Confederate War Centennial, according to Dr. Daniel Hollis, an appointed member of the centennial commission. Many historians point out that the flag's appearance likely had a more nefarious purpose: to symbolize Southern defiance in the face of a burgeoning civil rights movement. In March 1962, lawmakers passed a resolution directing the flag to be flown over the State House. As Time magazine later noted, the move was "a states'-rights rebuff to desegregation." In 1996, then-governor David Beasley advocated for the removal of the flag from the Capitol dome, but later backtracked and was voted out of office.

On April 12, 2000, the South Carolina State Senate passed a bill to remove the Confederate flag from the top of the State House dome by a majority vote of 36 to 7. The new bill specified that a more traditional version of the battle flag would be flown in front of the Capitol next to a monument honoring fallen Confederate soldiers. The bill also passed the state's House of Representatives, but not without some difficulty. On May 18, 2000, after the bill was modified to ensure that the height of the flag's new pole would be 30 feet (9 m), it was passed by a majority of 66 to 43. Governor Jim Hodges signed the bill into law five days later after it passed the state Senate. On July 1, 2000, the flag was removed from atop the State House by two students (one white and one black) from The Citadel; Civil War re-enactors then raised a Confederate battle flag on a 30-foot pole on the front lawn of the Capitol next to a slightly taller monument honoring Confederate soldiers who died during the Civil War. State law prohibited the flag's removal from the State House grounds without additional legislation.

In 2005, two Western Carolina University researchers found that 74% of African Americans polled favored removing the flag from the State House altogether. The NAACP and other civil rights groups attacked the flag's continued presence at the state capitol. The NAACP maintained an official economic boycott of South Carolina for 15 years, citing the state's continued display of the battle flag, until the flag was eventually removed completely from the State House grounds.

In 2000, the National Collegiate Athletic Association "announced that it will cancel future Association-sponsored events in South Carolina if that state doesn't take action to remove the Confederate battle flag from atop its state capitol." The association said that "many coaches and student-athletes feel that an inhospitable environment is created by the display of the Confederate flag over the South Carolina state house", and its chair said, "there is no question that to a significant number of our constituents, the flag is a symbol of oppression." Display of the flag has prevented South Carolina from hosting any championship sporting events in which the sites are determined in advance. This NCAA ban on postseason championships in South Carolina was strictly enforced, with the exception of HBCU Benedict College. In both 2007 and 2009, the school hosted the postseason Pioneer Bowl game, violating the NCAA ban, though no action was taken. On April 14, 2007, Steve Spurrier, coach of the University of South Carolina football team, made an acceptance speech for a community service award in which he referred to the flag on the State House grounds as "that damn flag." This statement was also inspired by the actions of, as Spurrier said, "some clown" who waved the battle flag while being videotaped for SportsCenter. On July 6, 2009, the Atlantic Coast Conference announced a decision to move three future baseball tournaments out of South Carolina, citing miscommunications with the NAACP concerning the display of the Confederate flag in the state.

In June 2015, Bree Newsome, filmmaker and activist, climbed the flagpole and removed the flag in the wake of the Charleston church shooting.

On July 10, 2015, Republican governor Nikki Haley signed a bill passed by the South Carolina General Assembly, which removed the flag, and it was given to the South Carolina Confederate Relic Room & Military Museum.

=== July 10 a flash point in Columbia ===
Dueling groups have been competing over the commemoration of the flag, if any, should be held on the anniversaries of its removal on July 10. After 2015, the South Carolina Secessionist Party has sometimes raised the flag on a temporary flagpole at the capitol on July 10 to mark the anniversary of the flag's removal. This was permitted because the group applied for and got permission to hold an event on the Capitol grounds, the flag was never left unattended, and the temporary flagpole and flag were removed, as required, at the end of the event. Protestors far outnumbered the two dozen flag supporters.

- In 2019, the permit of the South Carolina Secessionist Party was only valid from 6 to 8 AM, as a competing group, South Carolinians for Racial Justice, having requested it earlier than the Secessionists, had reserved the rest of the day specifically so that the flag could not be erected.
- In 2020, competing applications were received simultaneously. The State House Memorial Honor Guard flew the flag from 8 to 11:45 AM; the South Carolina Secessionist Party is defunct.

=== County and municipal flags and seals ===
Several county and municipal governments have adopted flags or seals that incorporate flags of the Confederacy or reference Confederate symbolism in their design.

==== Baldwin County, Alabama ====
The official seal of Baldwin County, Alabama features the Confederate battle flag as one of a set of six historic flags that have ostensibly flown over the county.

==== Mobile, Alabama ====
The flag of Mobile, Alabama, adopted in December 1968, features a slightly modified city seal. The seal displays six historic flags that have flown over the city. One is the Third National Flag of the Confederacy, featuring the Confederate battle flag as the canton.

==== Montgomery, Alabama ====
From April 19, 1952 until October 1, 2026, the flag of Montgomery, Alabama, featured a field of gray and red, divided by a blue bend fimbriated in white and charged with white stars and a gold wreath and the words 'City of Montgomery' in white. The gray referenced the uniforms of Confederate soldiers and the rest the Confederate battle flag. A new flag was adopted on May 5, 2026 and took effect on October 1, 2026.

==== Trenton, Georgia ====
The flag of Trenton, Georgia was adopted in 2001 to protest the decision of the state government that same year to change its flag to one with less prominent Confederate symbolism. The town flag is simply the former state flag of 1956-2001 defaced with the name of the town and year of its founding. The flag features a square Confederate Battle Flag with the Seal of the State of Georgia in white defacing a blue side dexter.

==== Mount Zion, Georgia ====
The flag of Mount Zion, Georgia, was adopted on April 10, 2007, inspired by the example of Trenton, Georgia. It also seeks to continue the display of the 1956–2001 variant of the Georgia state flag.

==== Cannon County, Tennessee ====
Cannon County, Tennessee, on July 17, 1993, adopted a county flag based on the Third National Flag of the Confederate States of America. The flag honors Nathan Bedford Forrest and the events of July 13, 1862, when the Confederate officer led a successful raid on the then Union-held town of Murfreesboro, Tennessee, freeing a number of citizens of the town of Woodbury, Tennessee, held prisoner. The flag occasionally flies at the county courthouse.

==== Williamson County, Tennessee ====
The seal of Williamson County, Tennessee features a Confederate battle flag and cannon. A flag with the same Williamson County seal featuring the Confederate battle flag on it flies on the county courthouse grounds as well. The county has sought to remove the image of the flag from the seal. It appealed to the Tennessee Historical Commission for permission, which was granted in May 2022. That decision was challenged by a lawsuit filed by the Major Nathaniel Cheairs Camp 2138 Sons of Confederate Veterans chapter in December 2022. A ruling is expected.

==== Minnieville, Virginia ====
Minnieville, Virginia is a former municipality and now unincorporated community in Prince William County, Virginia. It allegedly possesses a flag that is a modified version of the First National Flag of the Confederacy.

==== Remington, Virginia ====
From 1985 to late 2020, the town of Remington, Virginia, had a Confederate flag in its municipal seal. A variation of the seal, Confederate flag included, appeared on their police uniform shoulder patches.

The Remington town council voted to remove the Confederate flag from its seal on July 20, 2020.

==== Richmond, Virginia ====
From 1914 to 1933, the reverse of the city flag of Richmond, Virginia, featured the image of an escutcheon incorporating the Confederate battle flag and the motto Deo vindice ("With God as our protector"), a motto featured on the Seal of the Confederate States dating from 1864.

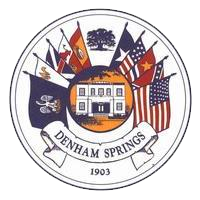
Seal of Denham Springs, Louisiana

Seal of Laredo, Texas

Flag of Mobile, Alabama

Flag of Montgomery, Alabama (1952–2026)

Flag of Mount Zion, Georgia

Flag of Trenton, Georgia

Flag of Cannon County, Tennessee

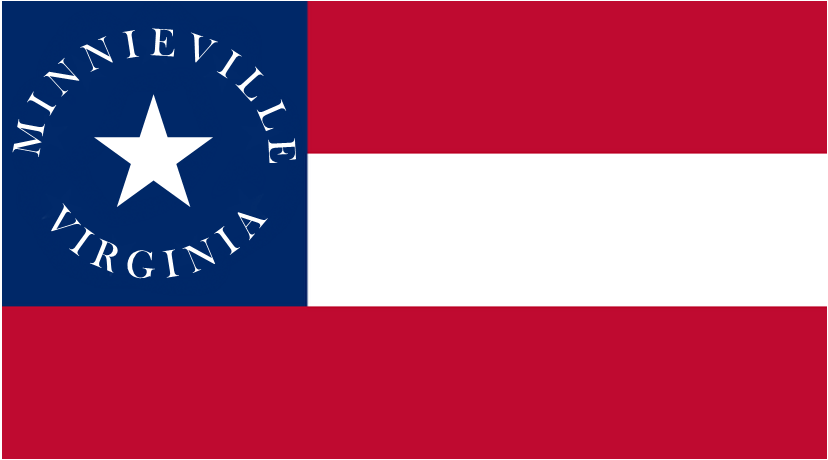
Unofficial flag of Minnieville, Virginia

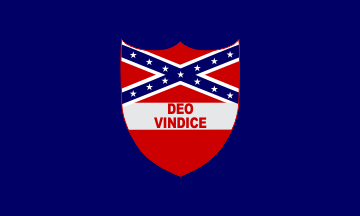
Former Flag of Richmond, Virginia (reverse, 1914–1933)

== In South America ==
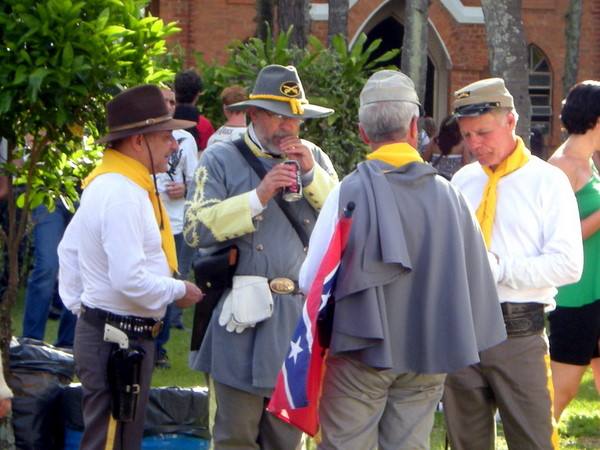
Scene from the annual Festa dos Confederados in the Brazilian city of Santa Bárbara d'Oeste

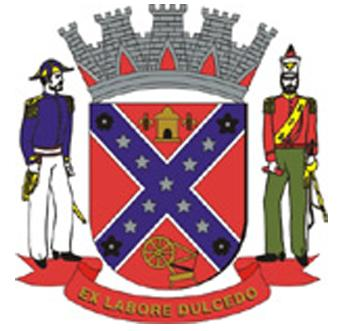
Coat of arms of the city of Americana, São Paulo, Brazil, from 1975 to 1998

From 1975 to 1998, a version of the Confederate battle flag appeared in the coat of arms and flag of Americana, São Paulo, a city in Brazil settled by Confederate expatriates.

In June 2022, in the Montevideo neighborhood of Pocitos, an individual displayed both the Confederate battle flag and the South African apartheid flag on their apartment's balcony. The individual removed both flags amid complaints and a police investigation.

== Presence in other parts of the world ==
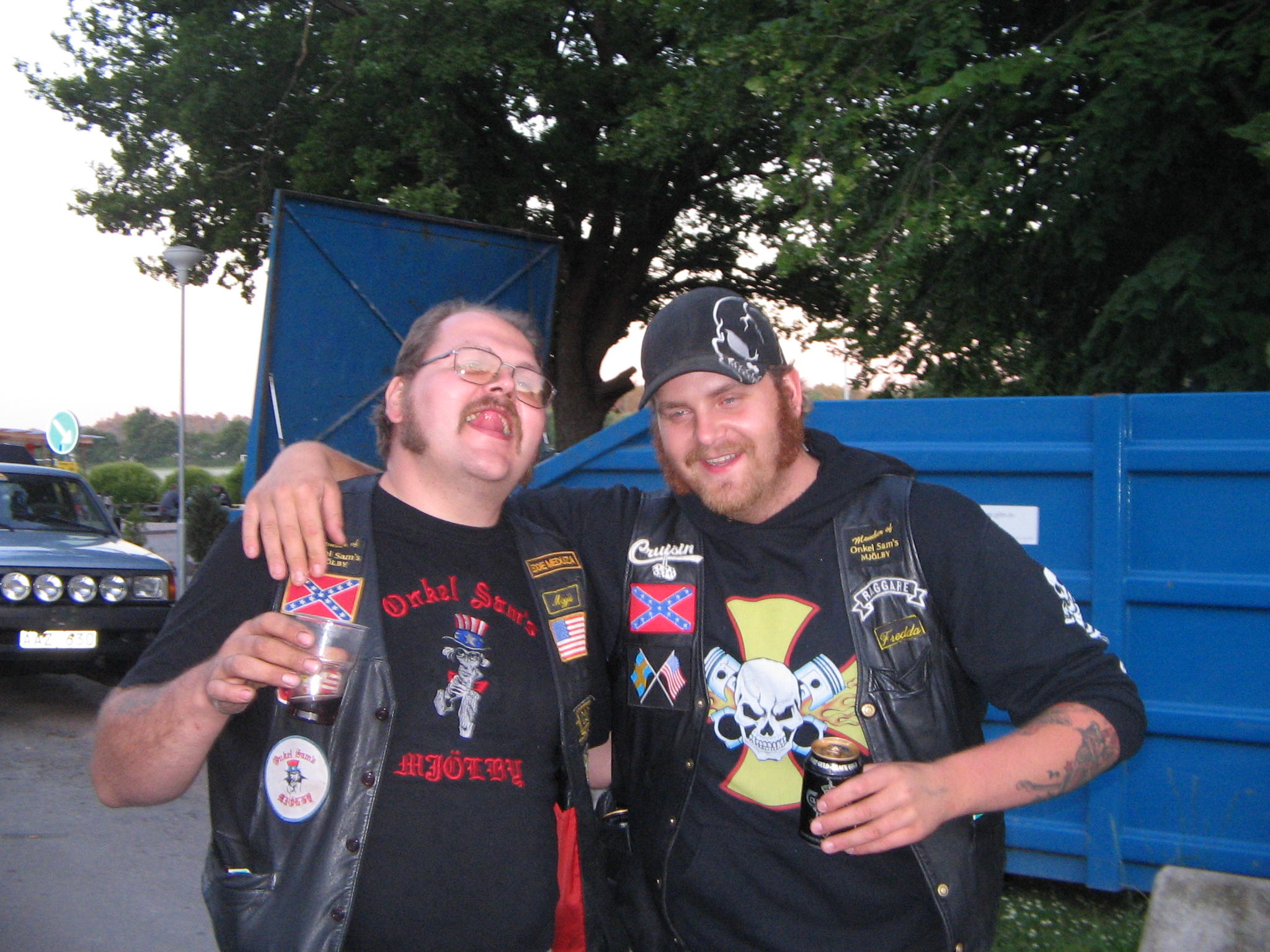
Two Swedish raggare sporting the Confederate battle flag

American culture is exported all over the world and as a result, noticeable display of the Confederate flag is not confined to North America. Various overseas groups, movements and communities make use of it, albeit sporadically in most instances. Much like in the United States, the flag is displayed for range of reasons, but is most often associated with slavery and racism. In countries where most Nazi symbols are prohibited by law, such as Germany, Neo-Nazi groups may fly the Confederate flag at rallies as a stand-in.

In Italy, some Southern Italian soccer fans, such as that of the association football club Napoli, have begun to display the Confederate flag as an alleged symbol of southern Italy's long-standing dissatisfaction with the North of Italy.

As in the U.S., some display the flag as a light-hearted symbol of "rebellion" without latching any significant political meaning to it. In Ireland, fans of both Cork GAA and Cork F.C. have waved the flag at intercounty and league matches, reflecting the nickname of County Cork as "the Rebel County" for its prominence in historical Irish rebellions, and red as the county color. GAA hurling is the most popular sport in Ireland, and the Cork team is called "the Rebels." In 2017, the Cork GAA president appealed to fans not to use such flags, and his successor in 2020 said they would in the future be confiscated at Cork stadiums. While the Republic of Ireland is noted for a lack of nativist or far-right activism, Northern Ireland has long suffered from sectarian division, often violently. Confederate symbols, including the battle flag, are often utilized by Ulster loyalists on the far-right. These groups usually passively condone the flag's association with racism and white supremacy while also invoking the shared Ulster-Scot heritage between some leaders of the Confederacy and Northern Irish Protestants. Several loyalist paramilitary groups have been known to display Confederate symbols; most notably the Red Hand Defenders, a designated terrorist group in the U.S., Ireland, and the UK for their role in sectarian violence, including murder, during the 1990s.

The car-centered raggare subculture of Sweden sometimes use the flags on their vehicles and clothing as a kitsch symbol to represent America, without political meanings, along with other American symbols such as cowboy hats, old American muscle cars and other Americana.

In none of these instances is the Confederate flag necessarily a long-standing or ubiquitous symbol of the movement or group known for either now or in the past openly displaying it. Both Southern Italian and Cork sports fans display other, most often local symbols, far more widely than they have the Confederate flag. For far-right groups outside of the U.S., the Confederate flag is only one of several flags prominently displayed, often alongside those of other historical imperial and/or fascist regimes associated with white supremacy, such as the flags of Nazi Germany, Fascist Italy, many flags associated with White and apartheid South Africa, and Rhodesia.

== Reactions to the Charleston church shooting ==
On June 18, 2015, the day after a deadly church shooting was perpetrated in Charleston, South Carolina, by white supremacist Dylann Roof, whose website contained pictures of him holding the Confederate Battle Flag, many flags were flown at half-staff, including those at the South Carolina State House. The Confederate battle flag flying over the South Carolina Confederate Monument near the state house was not at half-staff, as South Carolina law prohibits alteration of the flag without the consent of two-thirds of the state legislature. The flagpole lacked a pulley system, and thus the flag could not be flown at half-staff, only removed or left in place, as it was.

Flags flying over Fort Sumter, including the Stars-and-Bars as well as the Stainless Banner

In June 2015, the National Park Service ceased flying Confederate flags over Fort Sumter.

On June 23, 2015, three state governors—Terry McAuliffe of Virginia, Pat McCrory of North Carolina, and Larry Hogan of Maryland—announced plans to seek discontinuation of their states' Confederate flag specialty license plates. In addition to the Charleston killings, the governors cited the U.S. Supreme Court's decision in Walker v. Texas Division, Sons of Confederate Veterans, issued days earlier. The Court affirmed that states are not constitutionally obligated to issue Confederate specialty plates.

On June 24, 2015, Robert Bentley, governor of Alabama, ordered the removal of the Confederate flag from a memorial on the state capitol grounds. A spokeswoman for Governor Robert Bentley told the Montgomery Advertiser on Wednesday that he did not want the flag to be a "distraction". Speaking with AL.com, Bentley said he made the decision himself to take the flag down.

=== Removal from the South Carolina State Capitol ===
Following the Charleston shooting, many commentators questioned the continued display of the Confederate flag on the South Carolina State House grounds. Calls to remove the Confederate flag from the State House grounds, as well as debates over the context of its symbolic nature, were renewed after the attack by several prominent figures, including President Barack Obama, Mitt Romney, and Jeb Bush. On June 20, several thousand people gathered in front of the South Carolina State House in protest. An online petition at MoveOn.org encouraging the removal of the flag had received over 370,000 signatures by that time.

At a statehouse press conference on June 22, 2015, Governor Nikki Haley, flanked by elected officials of both parties, including U.S. Republican senators Lindsey Graham and Tim Scott, and former Republican Governor Mark Sanford, called for the flag to be removed by the state legislature, saying that while the flag was "an integral part of our past, it does not represent the future" of South Carolina. "We are not going to allow this symbol to divide us any longer," she said. The legislature, scheduled to meet the following day for a budget session, must vote by a two-thirds majority to extend the debate to the flag issue and by two-thirds to remove the flag from statehouse grounds, although some lawmakers have questioned the legality of that provision. Haley said she would call for a special session if the legislature did not act.

"With the winds that started blowing last week, I figured it would just be a matter of time," said Ken Thrasher, speaking for the South Carolina division of the Sons of Confederate Veterans, which opposed the flag's removal. "Whatever the Legislature decides to do, we will accept it graciously." A number of prominent Republicans who had previously appeared to struggle with the issue immediately endorsed Haley's call to remove the flag, including Kentucky Senator and Majority Leader Mitch McConnell, Republican National Committee chairman Reince Priebus, and governors and presidential hopefuls Scott Walker and Rick Perry.

On June 23, 2015, the South Carolina General Assembly added discussion of the flag to its special-session agenda in a procedural vote that indicated broad bipartisan support to remove the flag from the Statehouse grounds. The motion carried by a unanimous voice vote in the state senate and by a 103–10 vote in the state house. In the senate chamber, the desk of Clementa Pinckney, the pastor and state senator who died in the attack, was draped in black cloth with a white rose atop it. Among the legislators speaking in favor of removing the flag was Republican State Senator Paul Thurmond, son of Senator Strom Thurmond, whose 1948 "Dixiecrat" segregationist presidential campaign helped politically re-popularize the flag.

Eulogizing the Rev. Clementa Pinckney on June 26, 2015, before 5,000 congregants at the College of Charleston, President Barack Obama acknowledged that the shooting had catalyzed a broad movement, backed by both Republicans and Democrats, to remove the flag from official public display. "Blinded by hatred, [the gunman] failed to comprehend what Reverend Pinckney so well understood: the power of God's grace," Obama said. "By taking down that flag we express God's grace. But I don't think God wants us to stop there."

In the weeks before the flag was officially removed, several men and women, including activist Bree Newsome, were arrested for removing or attempting to remove the flag as well as various other offenses stemming from the protests around the flagpole. The attempts to remove the flag were criticized by several South Carolina state legislators who supported the flag's removal because they said such actions could hurt their goal to have the flag permanently removed.

On July 6, 2015, the South Carolina Senate voted, by the required two-thirds majority, to remove the Confederate flag from display on the South Carolina State House grounds. Following 13 hours of debate and over 60 attempts to amend the bill, the vote in the South Carolina House of Representatives to remove the flag was passed by a two-thirds majority (94–20) on July 9. Governor Nikki Haley signed the bill the same day.

On July 10, the Confederate flag was removed from the State House grounds and placed in storage for later display at the South Carolina Confederate Relic Room & Military Museum. Following the removal of the flag, the NAACP announced the end of its 15-year boycott of South Carolina.

=== The Citadel's Summerall Chapel ===
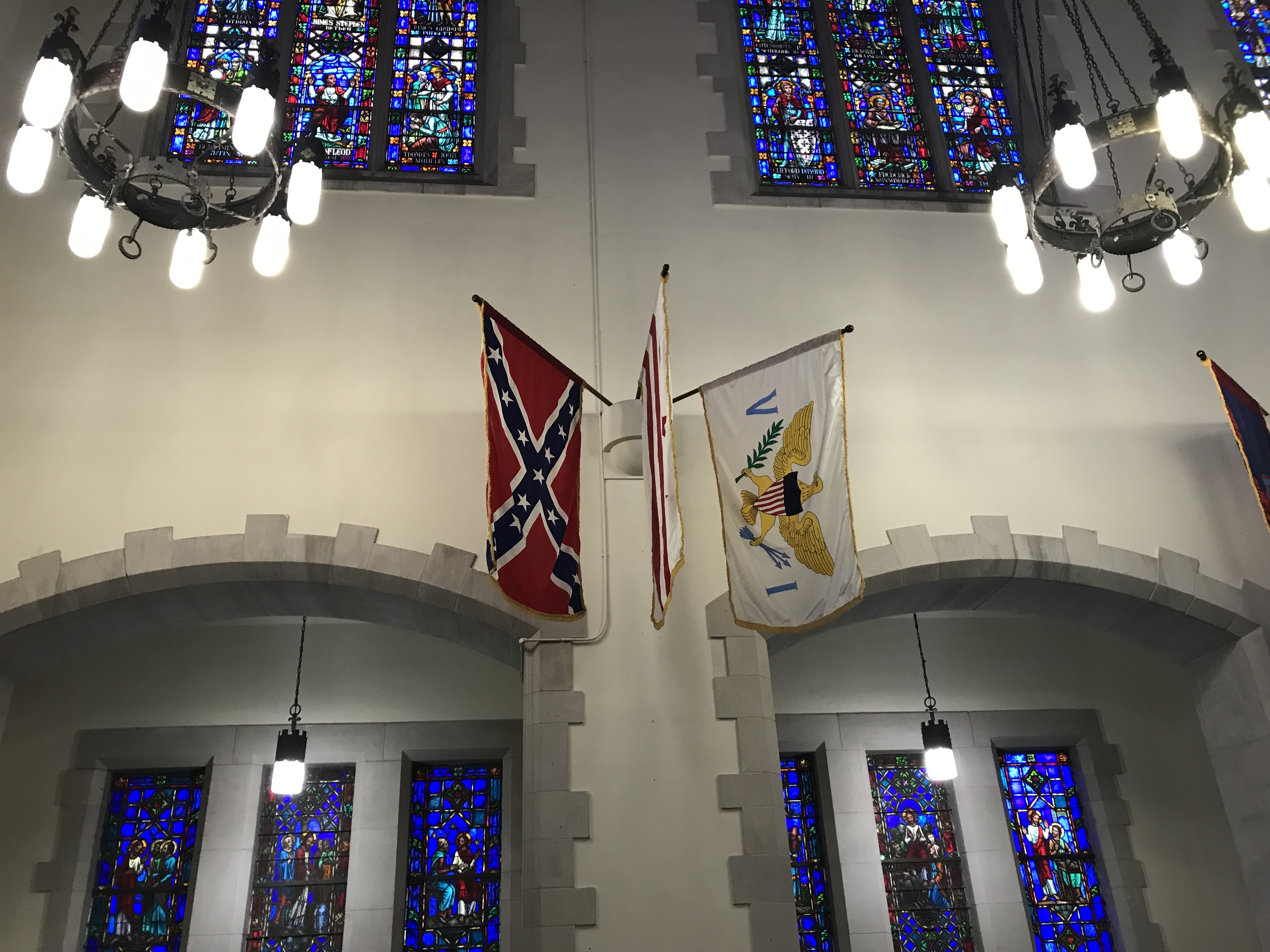
The Confederate naval jack, installed in The Citadel's chapel in 1939, with Flag of the United States Virgin Islands and Washington D.C. on display in September 2019

In June 2015, a controversy at The Citadel over a Confederate Naval Jack, model 1863–1865, ended when the school's Board of Visitors voted in favor of moving the flag from the Summerall Chapel to what was called "an appropriate location on campus." As of September 2017, the flag had not yet been removed, nor had an "appropriate location" been selected.

=== Marion County, Florida ===
A "Blood-Stained Banner" 3rd CSA flag flying on the grounds of the Marion County Governmental Complex was removed after the Charleston shooting, then reinstated, and eventually removed again. The old flag was taken to the nearby Marion County Historical Museum on Memorial Day 2016 for storage inside, and a new flag in the design of the 1st CSA flag was put up in a public display outside of the museum.

=== Retailer bans ===
Following the Charleston shooting, the retailer Walmart announced that it would no longer sell items with the Confederate flag on them. In a statement to the press, Walmart stated that "We never want to offend anyone with the products that we offer. We have taken steps to remove all items promoting the Confederate flag from our assortment – whether in our stores or on our web site."

Shortly afterward, a number of other retailers, including Amazon.com, eBay, Etsy, Sears (which also operates Kmart) and Target announced that they would also be removing Confederate flag items from sale. Google also pulled Confederate flag merchandise from their shopping site. Smaller flag retailers are also ceasing to sell it.

Valley Forge Flag, Annin Flagmakers, Eder Flag and the Dixie Flag Manufacturing Company, four of the largest U.S. flag manufacturers, also announced that they would cease selling Confederate flags.

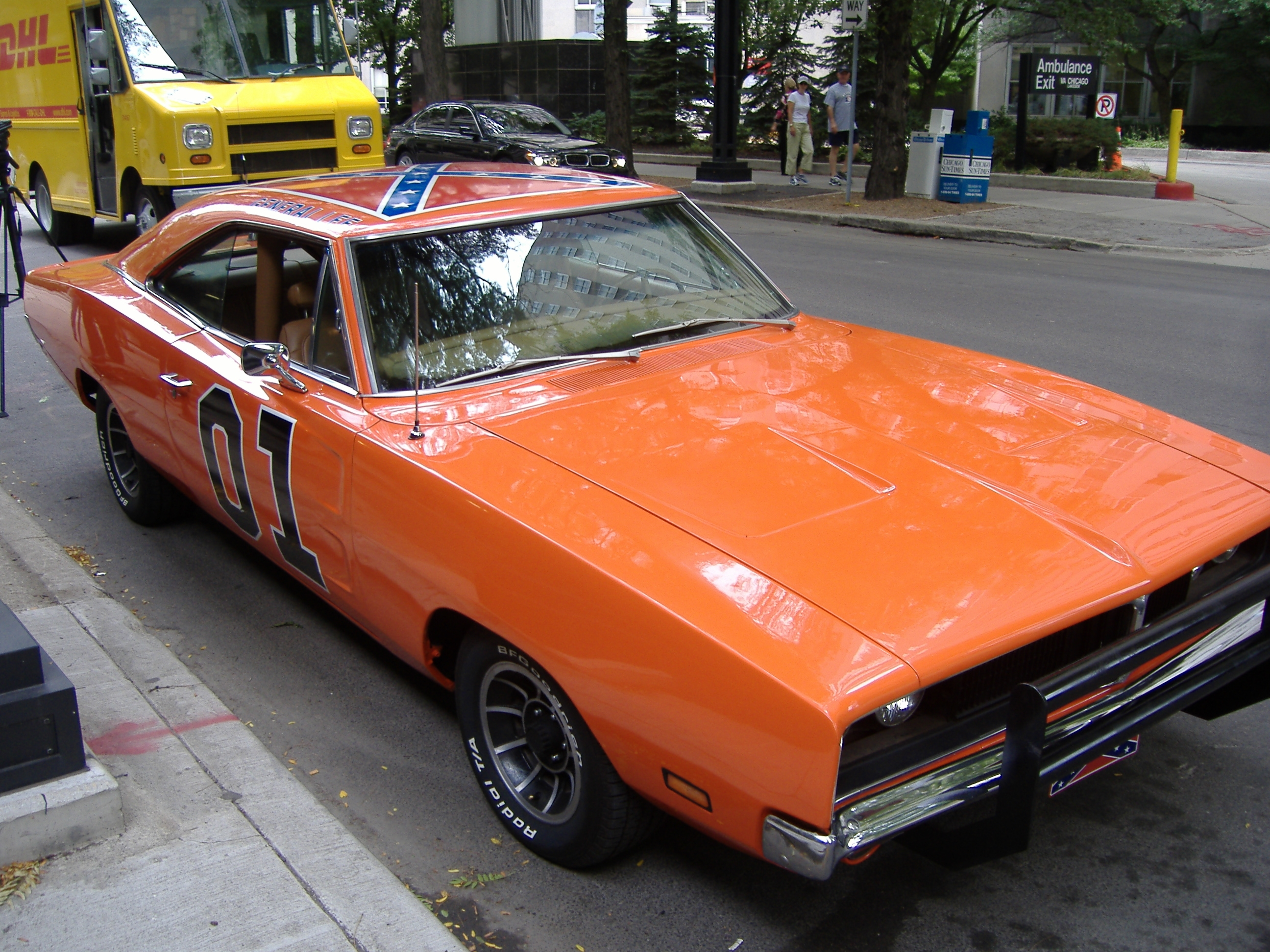
The "General Lee", 1969 Dodge Charger, featured in The Dukes of Hazzard

After the Charleston shooting, Warner Bros. announced that they were halting production of The Dukes of Hazzard "General Lee" toy cars, which prominently featured a Confederate flag on the roof of the car. Reruns of The Dukes of Hazzard television show were also pulled from TV Land's schedule due to the controversy. On July 2, 2015, professional golfer Bubba Watson announced that he would modify the General Lee car that he purchased at auction by painting an American flag over the Confederate flag that had appeared on the car's roof since it was customized for the TV series in 1978. Actor Ben Jones, who portrayed Cooter in the original series, announced that his chain of Cooter's Place novelty stores would still sell merchandise featuring the flag. Actor John Schneider, who portrayed Bo Duke in The Dukes of Hazzard television series, said he was "saddened" that Roof's murders could "cause one of the most beloved television shows in the history of the medium to suddenly be seen in this light."

Also, in June 2015, Apple's App Store began removing mobile apps featuring the flag. Several U.S. Civil War-based wargames were initially removed. However, Apple later announced that they were only targeting apps "that use the Confederate flag in offensive or mean-spirited ways" and working with developers who felt their apps were wrongly removed.

The U.S. National Park Service announced that it is requesting that its retail partners stop selling the Confederate flag, as well as other items that depict the flag as a stand-alone feature.

=== NASCAR ===
The American auto racing sanctioning body NASCAR, which has roots in the Southern United States and has many fans who fly the Confederate flag at campsites, has previously prevented the Sons of Confederate Veterans organization from sponsoring cars bearing the flag twice in 1993 (intended to be driven by Clay Young) and 2009 (intended to be driven by James Hylton in an ARCA race during that year's Speedweeks). ARCA also banned the sponsorship after the SCV planned to run the planned sponsorship on a stand-alone ARCA event.

Following the Charleston shooting, NASCAR supported Governor Haley's decision to remove the Confederate flag from the South Carolina State House. In addition, NASCAR chairman Brian France vowed that the members of NASCAR's sanctioning body would not associate themselves with the flag and aimed to eliminate it from races. NASCAR Sprint Cup Series drivers Dale Earnhardt Jr. and Jeff Gordon, along with team owner Brad Daugherty, also supported eliminating the Confederate flag from racing events. Prior to the Coke Zero 400 race at Daytona International Speedway on July 5, 2015, the track announced fans could voluntarily exchange Confederate flags for American flags. On July 2, 2015, NASCAR tracks issued a joint statement calling for fans to refrain from flying the flag at races, though many fans continued the practice. On June 10, 2020, amid the George Floyd protests, NASCAR announced that it would no longer permit the display of Confederate flags at its events.

=== Washington National Cathedral ===
At the Washington National Cathedral, the Confederate battle flag appeared in two stained glass windows, which memorialize the Confederate generals Robert E. Lee and Stonewall Jackson. On June 8, 2016, Mariann Edgar Budde, bishop of the Episcopal Diocese of Washington and the interim dean of the cathedral, said they would be removed "as soon as we can do it" and replaced, at least temporarily, with plain glass.

The windows were installed in 1953 after lobbying from the Daughters of the Confederacy. The dean of the cathedral, the Very Rev. Gary Hall, said the Charleston shooting was the catalyst for the planned removal, saying "It seemed to me that we couldn't, with credibility, address the race agenda if we were going to keep the windows in there." On September 6, 2017, the windows were removed.

=== Backlash against removal ===
Within a year of the shooting at Emanuel African Methodist Episcopal Church in Charleston, South Carolina, a backlash against the removal of Confederate flags that the shooting inspired was playing out across the country, according to Politico. The backlash also extended to the national political scene.

- In the first two months after the Charleston shooting, 173 Confederate flag rallies were held.
- Confederate flags were displayed at rallies supporting Donald Trump. A police officer, Michael Peters, resigned after being suspended for flying a Confederate flag from his pickup truck at a "Love Trumps Hate" rally, three days after Trump's presidential win. Even though event organizers of rallies "...ask participants only to bring American flags to the rally, with no Confederate flags allowed", they continued to be seen at rallies. On July 6, 2017, a Confederate battle flag was waved to greet President Trump upon his arrival in Poland for a brief visit before the G20 summit in Hamburg. While Trump expressed support for the removal of Confederate flags in 2015, racists, anti-government radicals, and states' rights activist believed that he offered dog-whistling encouragement to them during his 2016 presidential campaign.

=== 2018 display vandalized in South Carolina ===
Three Sons of Confederate Veterans groups erected the flags of the United States, South Carolina, and the Confederacy on June 16, 2018, on private land which was located outside Holly Hill, South Carolina. A sign said that the Sons of Confederate Veterans is honoring "All of Our Ancestors."

On June 21, 2018, a newspaper report said that graffiti that said "Move" and five dollar signs had been sprayed on the sign.

"Holly Hill Town Council asked the Confederate groups in April not to erect the display along U.S. 176. Mayor William Johnson said he was disappointed by the display."

== Removals due to the George Floyd protests ==
After both the Southeastern Conference and the NCAA threatened to ban games in Mississippi until the flag was changed, the Mississippi Legislature passed a bill in June 2020 to abolish the state flag, remove it from public institutions within 15 days of enactment, and create a nine-member commission to design a replacement that would exclude the battle flag and include the motto "In God We Trust". Governor Tate Reeves signed the bill into law on June 30, 2020. The flag commission accepted submissions for a new design from the public and the winner was put to a referendum on November 3, 2020. Mississippi voters overwhelmingly approved the measure; the new flag went into effect on January 11, 2021.

== See also ==
- Flaggers (movement)
- List of Confederate monuments and memorials
- The Proper Way to Hang a Confederate Flag
- Removal of Confederate monuments and memorials
- Christiansburg High School § Confederate Flag Protest
- List of symbols designated by the Anti-Defamation League as hate symbols
- Nazi symbolism
- Symbols of Francoism
- Fascist symbolism
- Flag of Novorossiya
