= South Carolina Confederate Relic Room & Military Museum =

The South Carolina Confederate Relic Room & Military Museum (SCCRRMM) is located at 301 Gervais Street in downtown Columbia, South Carolina, in a building shared with the South Carolina State Museum. It was founded in 1896, and is the oldest museum in Columbia and the third oldest in the state. Created by the United Daughters of the Confederacy, the museum was accredited for the third time by the American Alliance of Museums (AAM) in 2020, making it one of only seventeen museums out of eighty-two such institutions in South Carolina, as tracked by the Alliance. Families of Confederate veterans donated uniforms, weapons, flags, and other artifacts. Since its creation, the SCCRRMM has expanded to cover all of the state's military history, from the Revolutionary War to the war on terror. In 2022 there were exhibits on "Plowshares to Swords: Arming 19th Century South Carolina" and "SC in Vietnam".

Originally housed in the South Carolina State House, the museum relocated to the War Memorial Building adjacent to the University of South Carolina in the mid-twentieth century. In 1998, it became an agency of the South Carolina Budget and Control Board and moved to the Columbia Mills Building. The museum expanded in 2007, converting the old mill's former cistern into a new gallery.

The SCCRRMM earned a national American Association of State and Local History award for their Write from the Front program, which collects digital emails and photographs taken by service members while deployed in Iraq and Afghanistan.

The museum received the Confederate battle flag that was removed from the grounds of the South Carolina State House in 2015. It also contains artifacts from various military eras, in addition to its Confederate artifacts. The current (2022) logo makes the words "Military Museum" larger than "Confederate Relic Room".
