= Mary Brogan Museum of Art and Science =

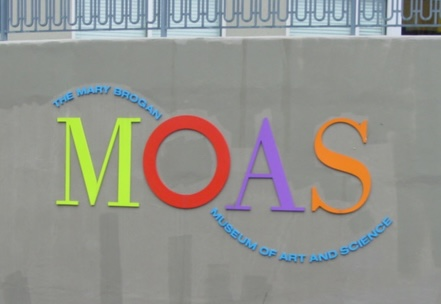
- Established: 1998
- Location: (former) 350 South Duval Street; Tallahassee, Florida
- Coordinates: 30.43902°N 84.28309°W
- Type: Art, Science center

The Mary Brogan Museum of Arts and Science, also known as the Brogan Museum and MOAS, was an art and science museum located at 350 South Duval Street, Tallahassee, Florida.

== History ==
Located in downtown Tallahassee on Kleman Plaza, the museum was formed from the merger of two struggling Tallahassee museums, The Museum of Art/Tallahassee and the Odyssey Science Center. The two former organizations were created independently in 1990 and 1991 respectively. The organizations agreed to share a common building, opening to the public in 1998. At inception, the building was known as the Capital Cultural Center. The building was constructed on land belonging to The City of Tallahassee and the Museum executed a transfer of its sub-lease to Tallahassee Community College (TCC) from Leon County Schools in 2003.

In July of 2000 the two organizations merged and posthumously renamed the building after former Florida Lt. Governor Frank Brogan's wife. Mrs. Brogan, who had died of cancer in 1999, had worked as an educational consultant during her husband's tenure as Lt. Governor and had a strong interest in arts and education.

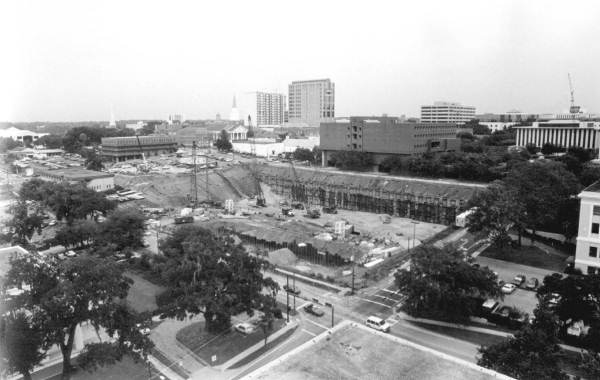
Construction of the Museum of Art and Odyssey Science Center, 1994

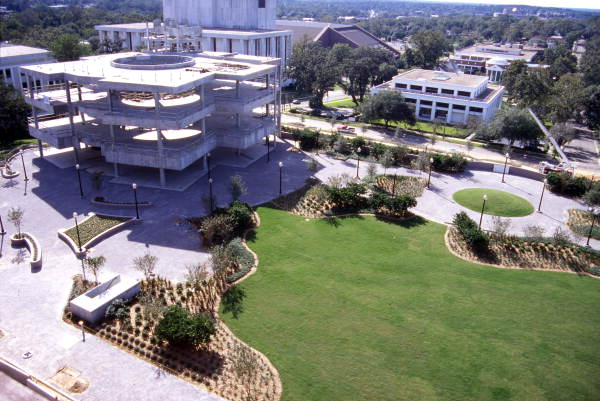
Bird's eye view showing construction of the Mary Brogan Museum of Art and Science at Kleman Plaza in Tallahassee, Florida, 1994

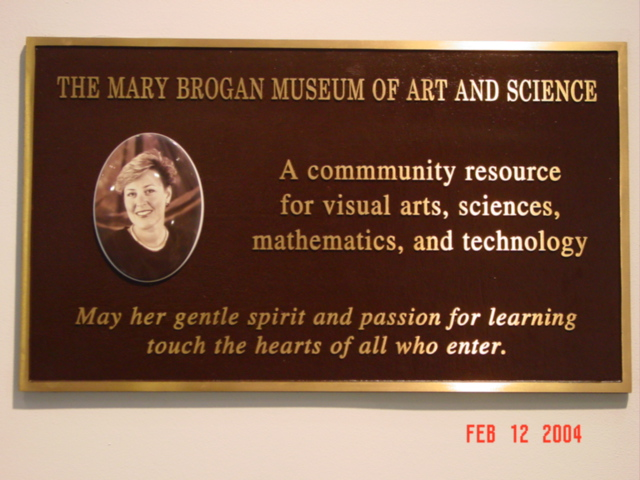

=== Exhibitions and Programs ===
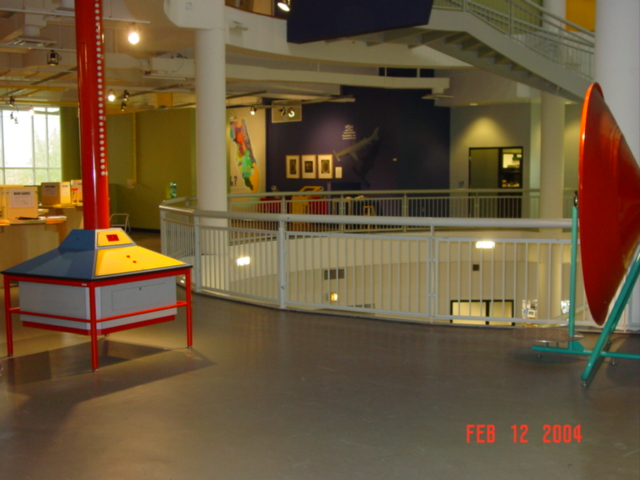
Second floor science exhibits.

The Museum was part of Association of Science and Technology Centers (ASTC) as well as a Smithsonian Affiliate. The museum's mission was to stimulate interest in, and understanding of, how visual arts, sciences, mathematics, and technology connect. The museum had two floors of interactive science exhibits, an art gallery displaying a range of works as well as a gift shop, educational classrooms and rental space for special events. A few notable exhibitions the museum staged include Bodies: The Exhibition in 2009, Dale Chihuly's Seaforms in 2003 and multiple showings of the various Kokoro Sanrio animatronic dinosaurs.

The museum ran a day-camp program focused on Art and Sciences, called "Camp All That!" Other programs and activates included StarLab (planetarium), EcoLab (aquatic life tanks) and the WCTV Weather station.

==== Florida's World War II Memorial ====
In 2004, in conjunction with the Florida Department of Education, the Florida Department of State and the Institute on World War Two and the Human Experience, the museum developed a curriculum for American History supplement on CD's, featuring historical educational materials, personal histories and interviews.

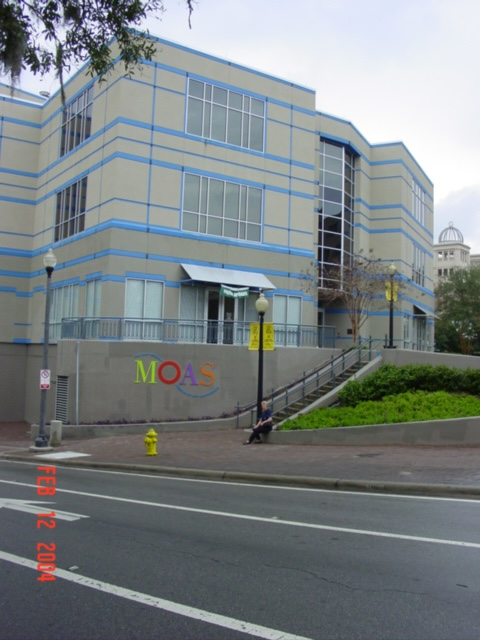
MOAS in 2004

===== Tallahassee Community College Expansion =====
In 2005 Tallahassee Community College expanded into basement space that had long laid dormant. A staircase, extending below the first to second floor stairway, was opened and classroom space created in the basement, adjacent to the Kleman Plaza parking garage.

==== Selected Science Exhibitions and Programs ====
2003: Seeing the Unseen: Photographs by Harold Edgerton

2010: Videotopia

2008: The Roswell Exhibit

2010: STRIDe Lab ME^{2} outreach program

==== Selected Art Exhibitions ====
2001: Hello Cuba. Braking Barriers Contemporary Cuban Contemporary Art

2001: Red Grooms: Serious Fun In the City

2001: Painters of Normandy: Roots of Impressionism

2002: Flora: Art and Ecology of Florida

2005: Art and Ecology Triennial

2006: Transitory Patterns: Florida Women Artists

2009: The Kinsey Collection

2008: Enrique Chavarria: Journey Into the Subconscious

2010: North by Southwest, Native American Art: From the Collection of : I.S.K. Reeves V & Sara W. Reeves

2010: Appetite: Expressions of the Politics Encircling Food

2011: Titanic: The Artifact Exhibition

2011: Coming Out of the Closet: Clothing Art as an Emergent Form

=== Controversies ===
In 2007, the art installation "The Proper Way to Hang a Confederate Flag" by artist John Sims garnered criticism from the local Sons of Confederate Veterans chapter. The piece, depicting a Confederate Battle Flag hanging from a wooden arm in a noose, was cited as "offensive, objectionable and tasteless" by Sons of Veterans members. The Brogan executive director noted "There's a balance between the nature of the art that we show and the outcome that we seek, which is to promote dialogue and conversation, and have you maybe think of something in a slightly different way". The Florida Attorney General's office agreed that no laws were broken with the display.

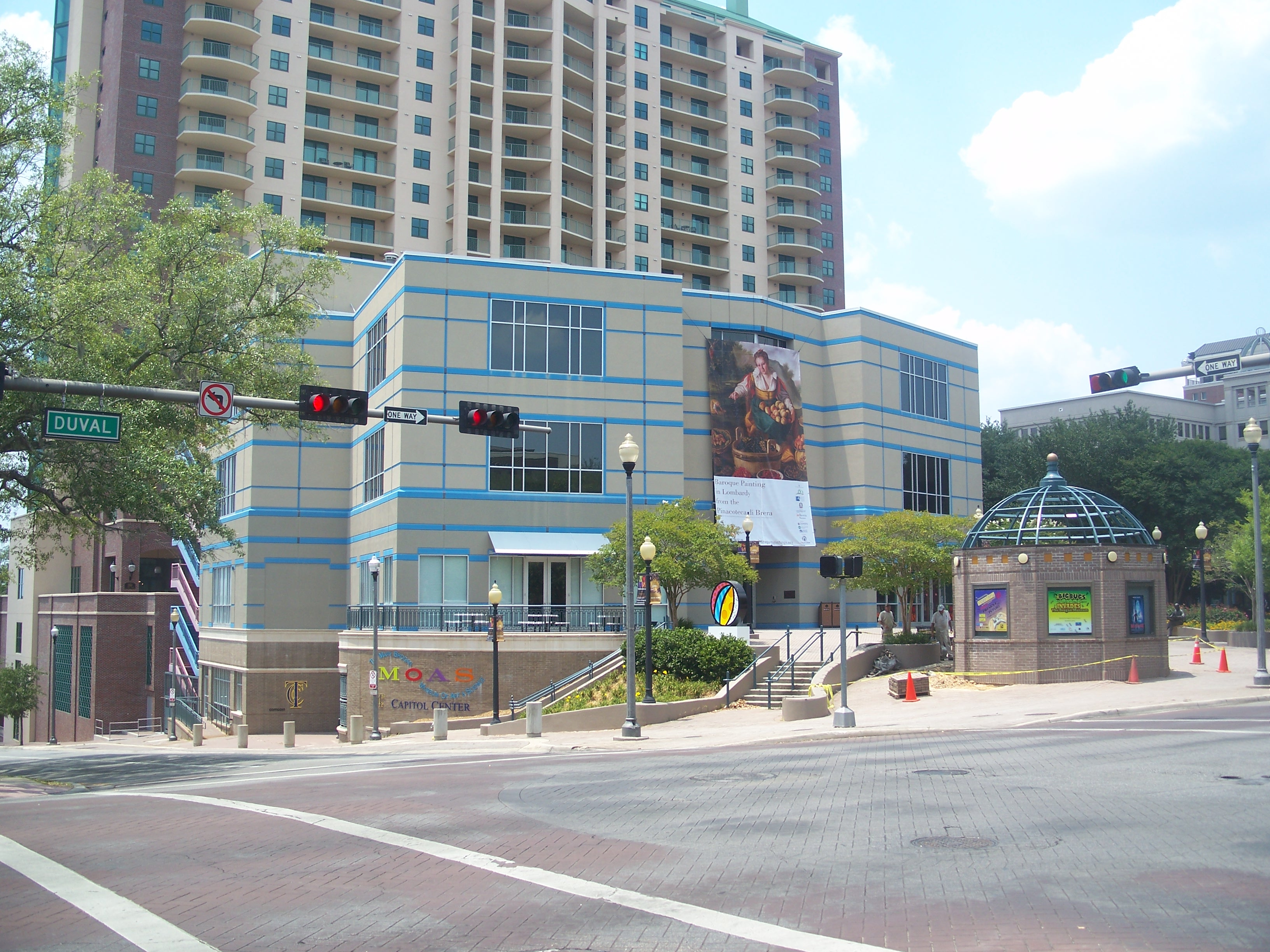
MOAS in 2011

In 2008, "The Roswell Exhibit" was controversial with local scientists who believed a museum dedicated in part to science should not be promoting "the pseudoscience of UFO's".

In 2009, the Bodies: The Exhibition show faced criticism due to possible human rights violations, resulting in a joint effort by the Florida Legislature and Anatomical Board of the State of Florida to restrict exhibits requiring museums to confirm that the human remains on display were ethically obtained.

In 2011, the Museum was requested to hold on to a piece of artwork that was part of a recently closed exhibit. The piece, “Christ Carrying the Cross Dragged by a Rogue,” by the Italian Renaissance artist Girolamo Romano, was reportedly looted from a Jewish family during the Holocaust. It was eventually returned to the heirs of the family.

== Closure ==
Throughout the brief existence of the Brogan (and predecessors), financial resources were always a struggle. As early as 2001 there were questions about the long-term viability of the museum. Museum leadership changes in 2005 gave hope for continued success, building upon a $3 million capital campaign launched the previous year.

In January 2012, TCC and the board of directors announced the "indefinite" closure of the Museum. The staff continued to offer limited programs, including "Camp All That!" through the summer of 2012. TCC and the board of directors spent most of the 2013 attempting to bridge the financial gap, including selling some of the museums artwork collection. In early 2013, when a bid for $150,000 in funding from Leon County fell through, the museum closed permanently, with "dire financial straits" and an inability to bring in "blockbuster" exhibits cited as reasons behind the closure.

=== Subsequent Use of the Building ===
In 2014 there were efforts to use the bottom floor for a non-profit center, while the upper floors were tangled in a legal dispute. According to the Tallahassee Democrat:

"Attorneys for both sides are attempting to clean up a "messy lease," first created in January 1992 when the school board was granted state funds to construct the building on land owned by the city of Tallahassee. The state money came with strings that mandate particular uses for the building. Expansion to the vacant areas can't occur until the Leon County School Board approves the terms of yet another amended lease."

By 2017, the building had been fully repurposed by TCC as non-profit innovation center:

"The 34,000-square-foot facility, which formerly housed the Mary Brogan Museum of Art and Science, underwent significant renovations. It now houses offices and conference rooms for rent, technology infused training and collaboration spaces, a retail incubator, tenants including WTXL-ABC 27 and a New Horizons Computer Learning Center, the Institute for Nonprofit Innovation and Excellence, and a Starbucks coffee shop. The Starbucks is licensed by TCC to help support retail training and student job opportunities and is part of TCC’s commitment to advance entrepreneurship in the College and the community."

In early 2020, after three years, TCC announced they were closing the Starbucks coffee shop located in the former museum gift shop space, citing financial struggles and high staff turnover.
