= The Proper Way to Hang a Confederate Flag =

Art installation by John Sims

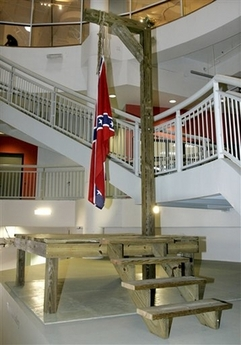
- Piece at the Brogan Museum
- Artist: John Sims
- Year: 2004; 22 years ago

The Proper Way to Hang a Confederate Flag is an art installation by John Sims. The controversial installation consists of a Confederate battle flag hanging from a noose at a 13-foot (4.0 m) gallows. The Proper way to Hang a Confederate Flag was first shown in Schmucker Gallery at Gettysburg College in 2004 as a part of Sims' Recoloration Proclamation: The Gettysburg Redress. Recoloration Proclamation targets specific traditional symbols of southern heritage, which are inextricably linked to slavery and racism in America. Included in the exhibition are recolored Confederate flags, a Confederate flag hanging from the gallows, a contemporary rewrite of the Gettysburg Address, contemporary recordings of the song "Dixie", and a documentary film. A notable piece featured in the exhibition Recoloration Proclamation: The Gettysburg Redress is ReVote, an installation featuring three voting booths used in Florida's disputed 2000 presidential election with re-colored Confederate flags hanging above, including black, red, and green for the Pan-African Flag of the African Liberation Movement. Pink and lavender Confederate flags with feathers and sequins were also created for the exhibition signifying "drag flags". John Sims received national media attention for his lynching of the Confederate flag.

A related exhibition, Dread Scott's interactive installation What is the Proper Way to Display a U.S. Flag? was first shown at The Art Institute of Chicago in 1989. Scott's piece became the center of national controversy over its use of the American flag. Dread Scott's piece begins with a photomontage of American flags draped over coffins as well as South Korean citizens burning American flags while protesting American foreign policy. The question, "What is the Proper Way to Display a U.S. flag?" is written across the images. The photomontage hangs above a table where exhibit visitors are invited to write their answers to Scott's question in a blank book. A three-by-five-foot (90 by 150 cm) American flag is placed on the ground in front of the table, and if visitors want to write in the book, they must first step on the flag. What is the Proper Way to Display a U.S. Flag? joined Sims' The Proper Way to Hang a Confederate Flag in Sarasota, Florida, at the Crossley Gallery in 2006.

== Exhibitions ==
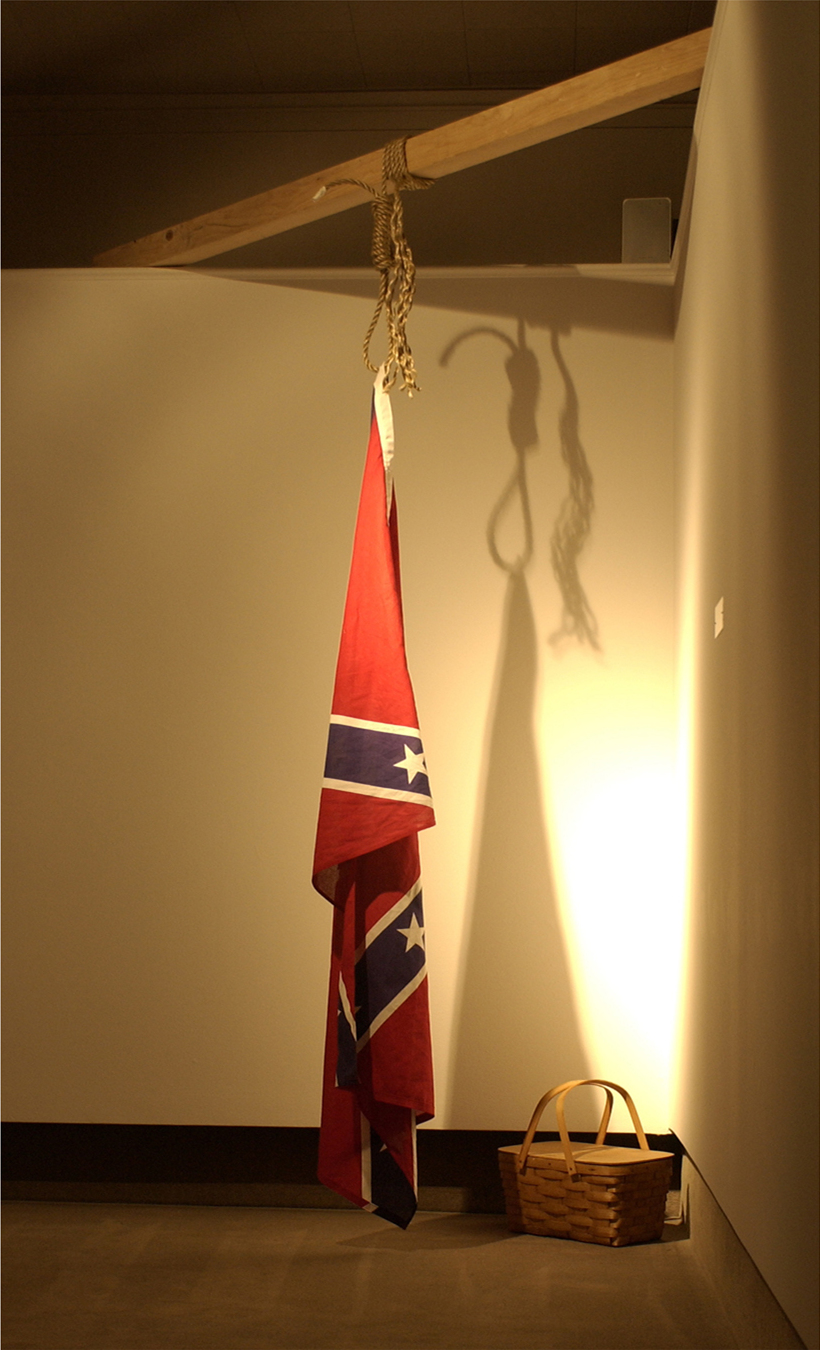
Schmucker Gallery, Gettysburg

- Schmucker Gallery, Gettysburg, Pennsylvania, 2004: The lynching exhibit was initially set to be installed outdoors in front of Schmucker Gallery at Gettysburg College, and would have remained open to the public for three weeks. Sons of Confederate Veterans, Gettysburg Battlefield Preservation Association (GBPA), and other members of the community objected strongly to the exhibition. Detractors interpreted the exhibit as anti-southern heritage. Sims wrote about his motivation, "...Our sense of history is segregated, our social identity is fractured and our vocabularies for discussing race, symbols and respect are bare." Ultimately, Gettysburg College administration changed the location and duration of the exhibit. The Proper Way to Hang a Confederate Flag was installed inside of Schmucker Gallery. John Sims boycotted the exhibition.
- Georgia State University, Atlanta, 2005: The Proper Way to Hang a Confederate Flag was shown in a group show, Potentially Harmful: The Art of American Censorship. The group exhibition examines the role of artistic controversy in shaping a free society. Through two exhibitions, presentations of spoken word and performance artists, artists' talks, panel discussions, a film screening and a series of legal seminars, this project reflects an environment that nurtures contentious art. Artists included in the exhibition are Lynda Benglis, Critical Art Ensemble, Sue Coe, Benita Carr, Alex Donis, Karen Finley, Eric Fischl, Tom Forsythe, John Jota Leaños, Gayla Lemke, Alma Lopez, Robert Mapplethorpe, Carolee Scheemann, Dread Scott, Andres Serrano, Elizabeth Sisco, Louis Hock, David Avalos, John Sims, John Anthony Trobaugh, Pat Ward Williams, Nancy Worthington, Marilyn Zimmerman, and The File.
- Crossley Gallery, Sarasota, Florida, 2006: The Proper Way to Hang a Confederate Flag was shown at Ringling College of Art and Design in the Crowley Gallery alongside Dread Scott's What is the Proper Way to Hang a U.S. Flag?:
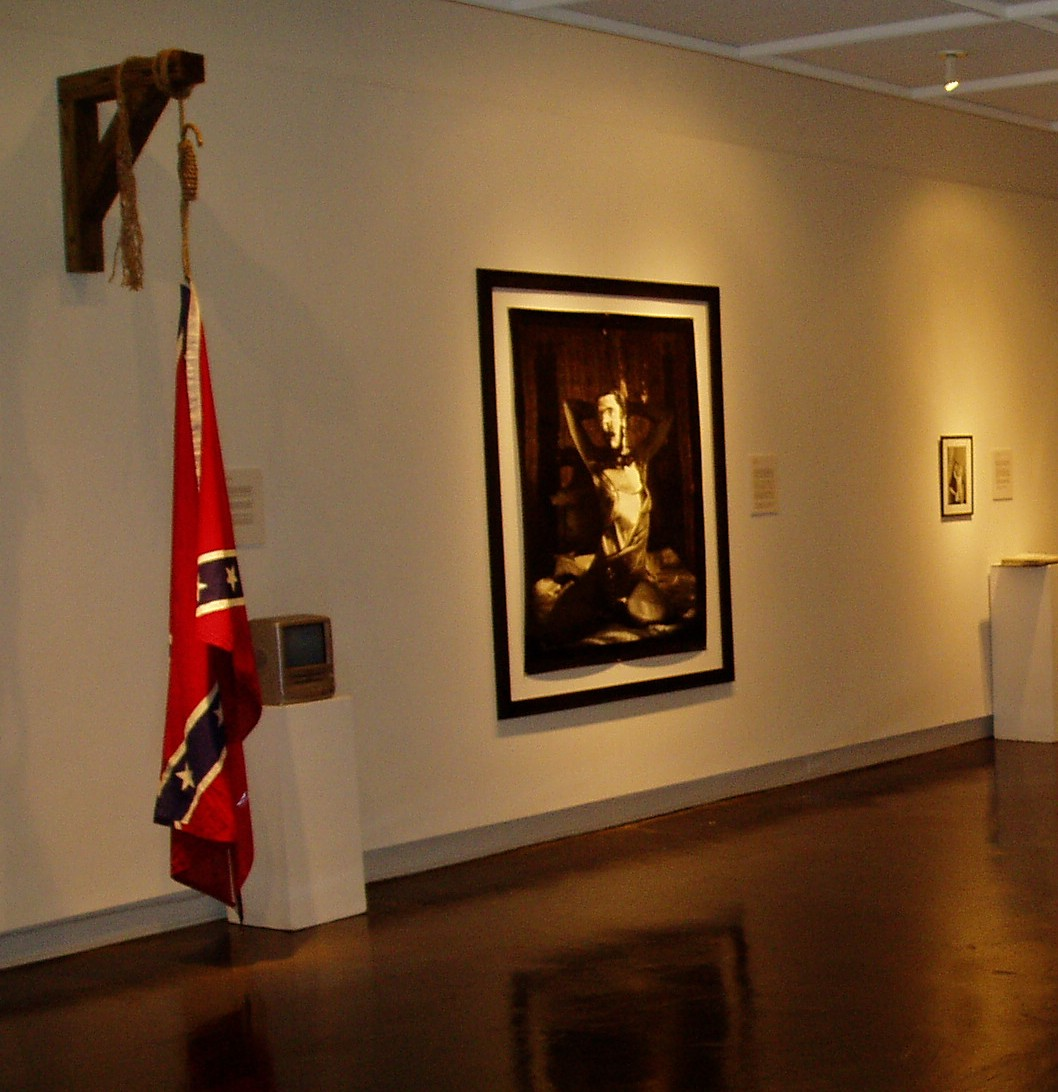
  Crossley Gallery, Sarasota
- Bowery Poetry Club, New York, 2006: Recoloration Proclamation: The New York City Hangings was the title of the New York City exhibition. Acclaimed controversial performance artist Karen Finley performs a piece in response to Sims' work during the exhibition.
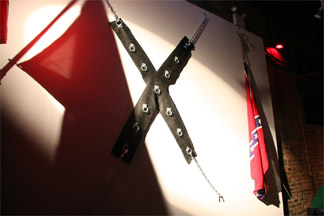
  Bowery Poetry Club, NYC
- Brogan Museum, Tallahassee, Florida, 2007: Sims' exhibition remained on display despite protests from the Sons of Confederate Veterans, who called it once again an affront to Southern heritage. The Mary Brogan Museum of Art and Science said it stands by Sims' work, which was part of a larger exhibit, AfroProvocations.
- Kennedy Museum of Art, Ohio University, Athens, Ohio, 2017: On October 26, 2017, in front of the E.W. Scripps Amphitheater at Ohio University, Sims's concept came was fully realized. "Confederate Flag: A Public Hanging" took place as originally conceived: with community participation, music, speeches and readings. The flag was ritually hung from a 13-foot (4.0 m) gallows in a symbolic act of judgment against the history of white supremacy. Following this performance event, the flag was carried to the Kennedy Museum of Art and installed in the exhibition "Expression and Repression: Contemporary Art Censorship in America" as "The Proper Way to Hang a Confederate Flag." The exhibition also featured Kara Walker, Sue Coe and David Wojnarowicz, and was on view through December 22, 2017.

== Sources ==
- Confederate Flag art exhibit stirs passions in Gettysburg, Pittsburgh Post-Gazette, 4 September 2004
- NY Times
- USA Today
- Herald Tribune
- Asheville Tribune
- SP Times
- Fox News
- CBS News
- Dred Scott
- Civil War News
