= Flag of Trenton, Georgia =

- Use: City flag
- Adopted: 2001

The former Georgia state flag (1956–2001)

The city flag of Trenton, Georgia was adopted in 2001 as a protest following the change of the state flag of Georgia. The flag has been controversial because it incorporates the Confederate Battle Flag.

== History ==
In 1956, the state of Georgia changed its flag to largely feature the Confederate battle flag as part of a protest against desegregation. In 2001, the Georgia General Assembly voted to change the flag, relegating the location of the Confederate flag to a greatly reduced place on the state flag. The city of Trenton opposed this new flag. In the same year, the city's commissioners voted to adopt the former state flag as the city's flag as a protest, which became official in 2002. The State of Georgia had stated that it would withdraw funding for any municipality that refused to fly the new state flag and continued to fly the old one. Trenton circumvented this when they adopted the flag by altering the former state flag by adding "City of Trenton" and "Incorporated 1854" to it. It also flew the new Georgia state flag and the flag of the United States along with the city flag in keeping with the state regulations.

The change was not universally supported, and in 2004 the new mayor of Trenton, Anthony Emanuel, removed it. However, following objections from the Sons of Confederate Veterans that the flag represented their heritage, a referendum was held in 2005. The city's residents voted 278–64 to keep the city flag with the confederate emblem.

== See also ==
- Mount Zion, Georgia, another city in Georgia with a flag featuring the Confederate battle flag
