= Dixie Flag Manufacturing Company =

The Dixie Flag Manufacturing Company, based in San Antonio, Texas, is a prominent U.S. flag manufacturer. The company was founded in 1858.

In June 2015, following the events of the Charleston church shooting, the company announced that it would no longer sell Confederate flags.
