= Valley Forge Flag =

U.S. flag manufacturer

Valley Forge Flag Company
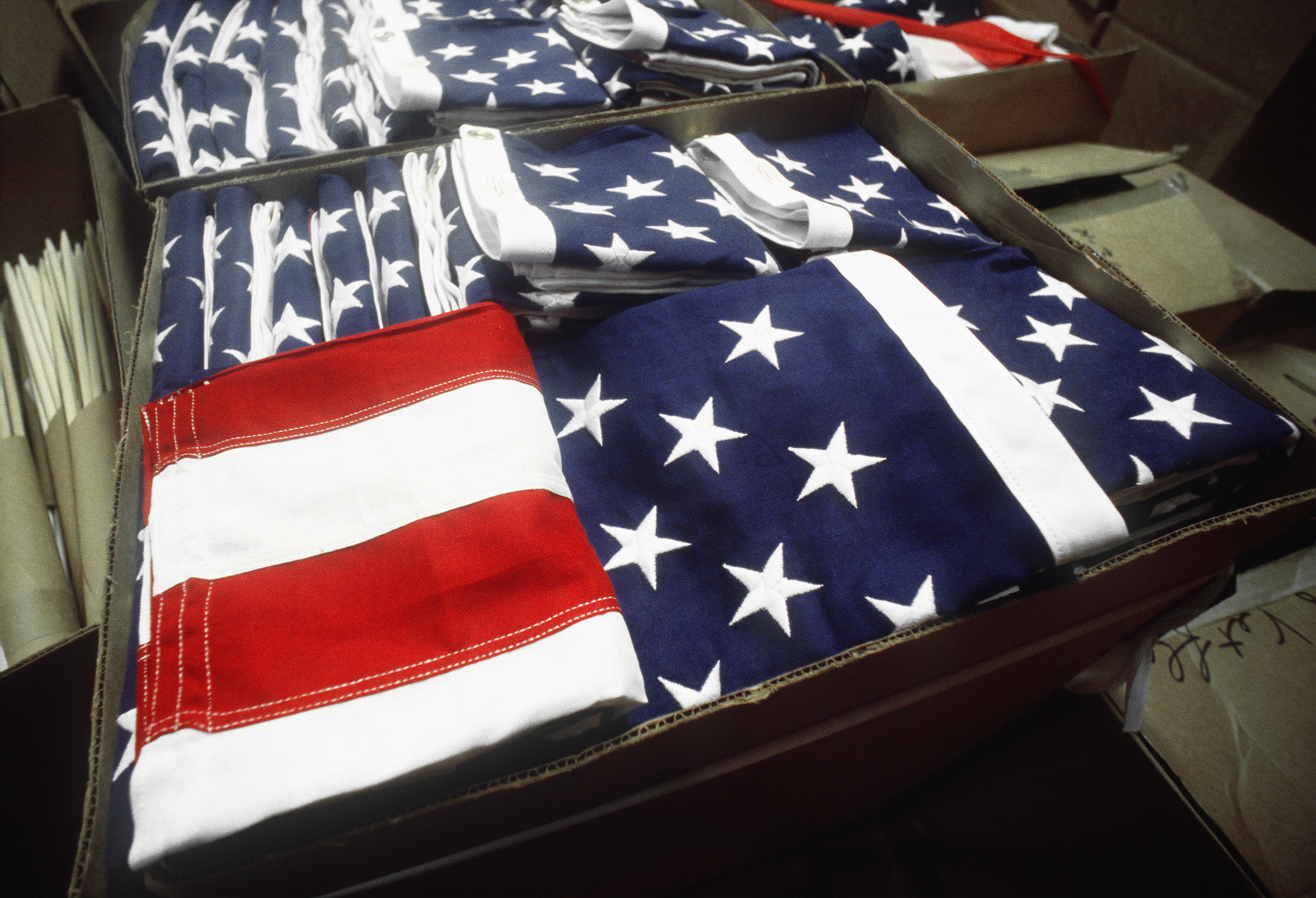
- Founded: 1882
- Headquarters: Wyomissing, Pennsylvania, United States
- Key people: Debra Liberman Bergman (President); Tom Fellner (Chief financial officer)
- Products: American-made state and federal flags, Flag hardware and accessories, Patriotic decor
- Website: www.valleyforgeflag.com

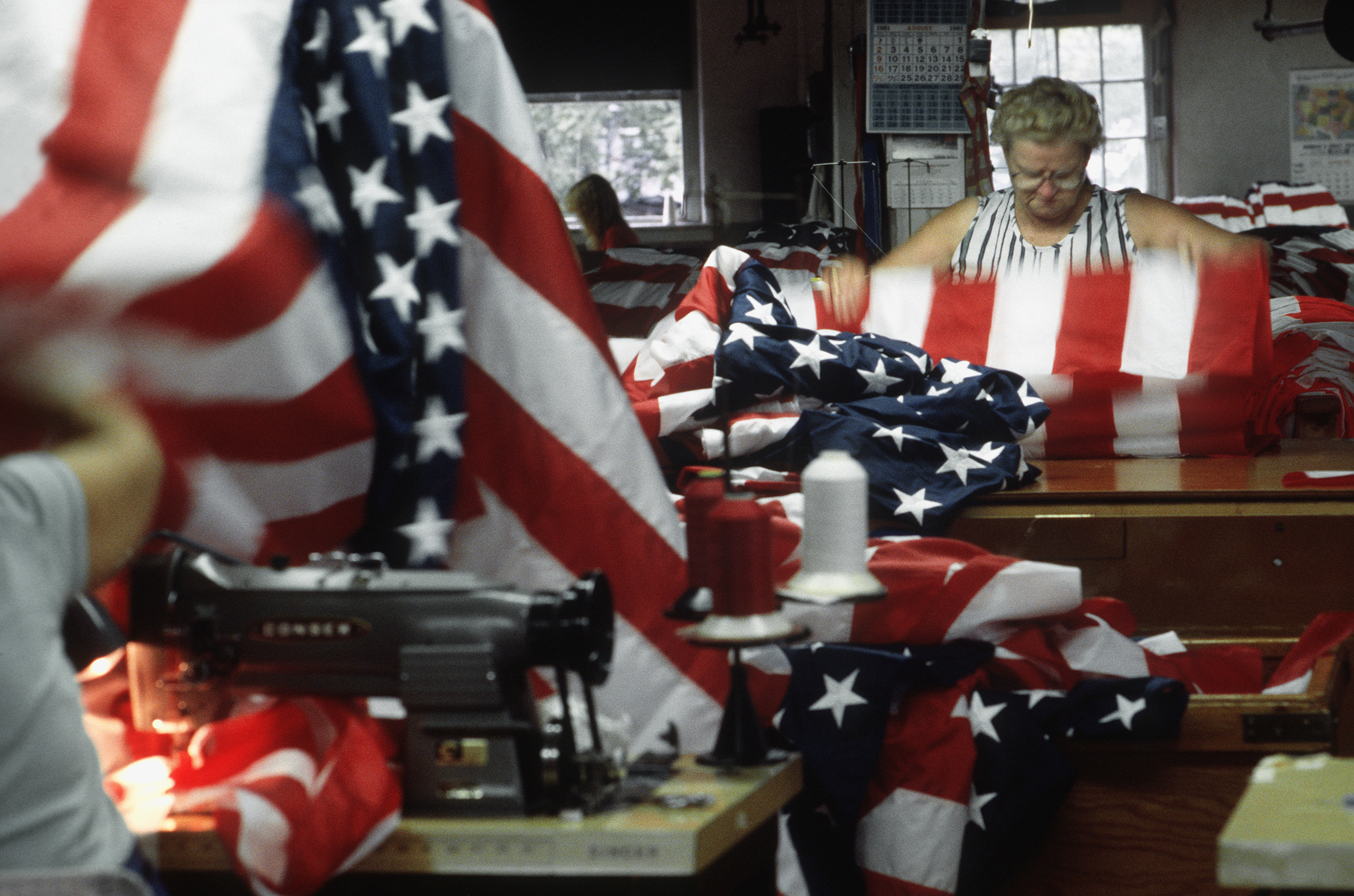
Valley Forge Flag Company employee folds recently completed U.S. flags, Spring City, Pennsylvania, July 1, 1982

Valley Forge Flag, based in Wyomissing, Pennsylvania, is one of the largest U.S. flag manufacturers. The company was founded in 1882. It has a large wet printing facility in Olanta, South Carolina.

== History ==
During the 1930s, Valley Forge Flag was listed on multiple city, county and school district budget reports as a supplier of American flags for daily and ceremonial occasions, including daily flag raisings at public schools and local, state and federal government agencies across the United States and for decorating graves at community cemeteries on Memorial Day. On July 1, 1937, the publisher of The Record-American newspaper in Mahanoy City, Pennsylvania announced that it was selling five-by-three-foot and six-by-four-foot American flags and "flag sets, priced reasonably" that included flag poles and were manufactured by the Valley Forge Flag Company to encourage area residents to decorate their homes and businesses "with patriotic symbols" for the Independence Day holiday weekend.

During the first eight months of 1941, as America was continuing to mobilize its military forces for large-scale entry into World War II, the United States Department of War awarded contracts worth $35,410 and $8,596 in January and August 1941, respectively, to Valley Forge Flag for "range flags" and "scarlet streamers." The demand for American flags subsequently increased, following the Attack on Pearl Harbor by the Imperial Japanese Navy Air Service on December 7, 1941.

Following the war, the company continued to sell its flags to civic groups, government agencies and public schools nationwide. Demand for American flags continued to be strong, periodically outpacing production well into the mid-1950s.

By 1958, the company had become one of the largest manufacturers of state and federal government flags in America. Still busy manufacturing the forty-eight-star flag of the United States that year, company personnel were not yet prepared for the production changes that would occur when the federal government approved the addition of two new stars to the flag, following the admission of Alaska and Hawaii into statehood on January 3 and August 21, 1959, respectively. In March 1959, forty-five and seventy-five workers were furloughed, respectively, at the company's plants in Robesonia and Sinking Spring, Pennsylvania during the transition that occurred between the time that the forty-ninth star was added for Alaska and the time the fiftieth star was added for Hawaii.

In December 1963, newspapers reported that female employees of the Valley Forge Flag Company's Womelsdorf plant may have been the workers who sewed the American flag that draped the casket of U.S President John F. Kennedy, following his assassination on November 22. Lieutenant Samuel R. Bird, commander of the honor guard from Fort Myer, Virginia that was involved in the planning and implementation of the president's state funeral, confirmed that one of the company's flags had covered Kennedy's coffin. Those reports have since been confirmed by historians and curators at the John F. Kennedy Presidential Library and Museum, which has preserved the flag in its collection.

By the time that the company's president, Sidney Liberman, died in 1967, the company had expanded to include operations in Baumstown, Birdsboro, Robesonia, Royersford, Spring City, and Womelsdorf, Pennsylvania. He was survived by his brothers Abraham Liberman, who was serving as the company's secretary-treasurer, and George Liberman, who had previously served as an officer of the company. All of the company's plants were closed for the day on March 20 of that year, in recognition of the memorial services that were being held for Sidney Liberman.

== Present day ==
In June 2015, following the events of the Charleston church shooting, Valley Forge Flag announced that they would cease to sell Confederate flags.

During 2020, flag production was initially slowed by the COVID-19 pandemic; however, company officials announced in June of that year that state governors had allowed flag manufacturing plants to reopen.
