= Flag of Richmond, Virginia =

Flag of Richmond
- Use: Other
- Proportion: 29:43
- Adopted: 1993; 33 years ago
- Design: A navy blue field in the upper two-thirds quadrant with two red and two white stripes beneath in the lower third of the flag, it features a silhouette of a person working a James River bateau down the James River.
- Designed by: Michael Davis

The flag of Richmond, Virginia was adopted in 1993. The flag contains a navy blue field in the upper two-thirds quadrant with two red and two white stripes beneath in the lower third of the flag. It features a silhouette of a person working a James River bateau down the James River.

A city committee headed by Second District Councilman Benjamin A. Warthen brought forth the design, which was based on a proposal submitted by Michael Davis, a committee member and graphics designer at Heilig-Meyers Co. The new Richmond flag was carried by bateau to the dedication ceremony on Brown's Island on November 24, 1993.

== Symbolism ==
An older flag of Richmond - 1914–1933

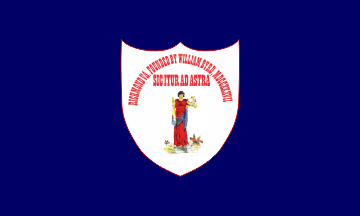
obverse

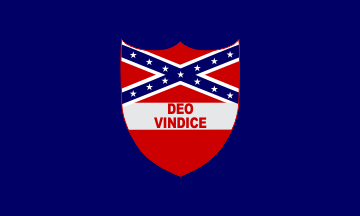
reverse

The boatman is a graphical depiction of a 14-foot (4.3 m) tall bronze statue called "The Headman" that stands on Brown's Island and commemorates the African American contribution to Richmond's waterways. The nine stars on the flag represent the nine states that were once part of Virginia's territory: Virginia, West Virginia, Ohio, Kentucky, Tennessee, Illinois, Wisconsin, Michigan, and Indiana.

== Reception ==
In a 2004 survey by the North American Vexillological Association, Richmond's city flag was ranked as the 15th best city flag in the U.S.
