= Flag of Mobile, Alabama =

City of Mobile
- Proportion: 1∶2
- Adopted: December 4, 1968
- Design: A horizontal triband of red (top), white (middle), and blue (bottom), with white strips above the red and below the blue and the Seal of the City of Mobile in the center
- Designed by: Lambert C. Mims

Seal of Mobile
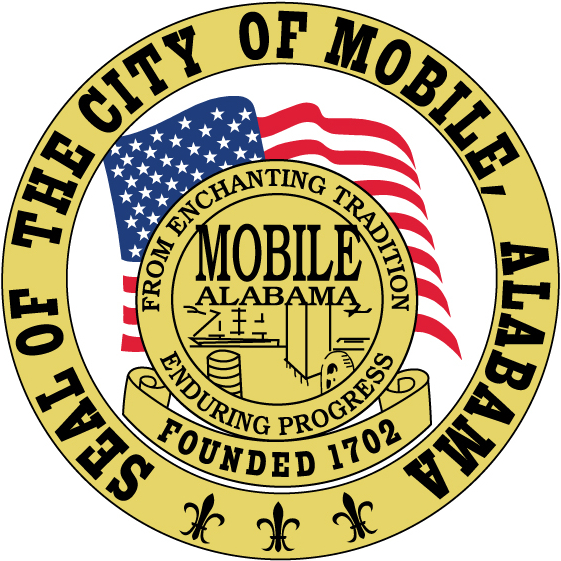
- Seal in use since 2015

Versions
- Seal of 2000–2015
- Armiger: City of Mobile, Alabama
- Adopted: 2015
- Motto: From Enchanting Tradition Enduring Progress — Founded 1702

The flag of Mobile, Alabama was designed by Lambert C. Mims and adopted on December 4, 1968. It features a red stripe, a blue stripe, and the city seal all on a White field. It is the current and only flag of Mobile.

== Flag ==
=== History ===
The design of the flag was suggested by Commissioner Lambert C. Mims. The Mobile Board of City Commissioners approved of the flag design during a conference meeting on December 4, 1968.

In 2004, the North American Vexillological Association conducted a design survey of 150 selected city flags in the United States. Mobile's flag ranked 76th with a rating of 4.05 out of 10.

=== Design ===
The flag is defined by law as:

The field is white. On a width of 6.5 units, a horizontal red stripe of 1 unit runs across the top of the field, about .5 units from the top edge. A blue horizontal stripe of 1 unit runs across the bottom, about .5 units from the bottom edge. In the center of the field is the circular seal of the city, approximately 3 units in diameter.

=== Symbolism ===
The flags on the seal represent the six nations that have governed Mobile. The seagull and ship represent how Mobile is among the nation’s 10 major seaports. The cotton bale represents Mobile’s early growth and prosperity. The tall building and water mill represent the many industries that have come to Mobile.

== Seal ==
=== History ===
The seal of Mobile, Alabama was adopted in 1961. The seal originally depicted the Confederate battle flag, but in August, 2000, a resolution was passed that replaced the battle flag with the third national flag of the Confederacy.

In 2015, the City Council of Mobile voted to remove 5 of the 6 flags on the seal, leaving only the United States flag.

The Mobile Police Department did use a seal with a near identical design, but they have since adopted a new seal.

=== Design ===
The seal has been described by the North American Vexillological Association as:

Around its outside edge is a gold ring on which SEAL OF THE CITY OF MOBILE, ALABAMA appears clockwise in black letters reminiscent of a 19th-century Barnum font. The letters begin about 7 o'clock and end at 5 o'clock. In the space remaining at the bottom of the ring, between "SEAL" and "ALABAMA" are three fleurs-de-lis, also in black. The field of the inner portion of the seal is also white. A smaller seal of about 1 unit in diameter, all in gold with black lettering and figures, is placed centrally in the lower half of the larger seal's field so that the smaller seal's top edge is very slightly above the field's midpoint. The smaller seal also has an outside ring on which FROM ENCHANTING TRADITION curves clockwise over its top and ENDURING PROGRESS curves counterclockwise below. In the center of this smaller seal, in its upper half, appears MOBILE, and slightly smaller, immediately below it, ALABAMA. The words fill the top half of the inner field. In the lower half are several figures: A sailing ship and seagull, upper hoist; a bale of cotton, lower hoist; a tall building, upper fly; and a mill, lower fly. Below the smaller seal is a ribbon, also gold with black letters, with FOUNDED 1702 between the smaller seal's outer edge and the inner edge of the larger seal's ring.

Arrayed around the smaller seal in the upper portion of the larger seal's field are six partially furled flags forming a semicircle around the seal. The flags are (from the hoist):

- France (the white semy-de-lis ensign from 1638–1790)
- United Kingdom (national flag from 1606–1801)
- The United States of America (presumably of 1813, but generic in appearance)
- The Confederate States of America (either the second or third national flag)
- Spain (the red-yellow-red horizontal tribar from 1785)
- Flag of the Independent Republic of Alabama (a portion of the blue field of that flag has none of the design of it visible)

The flag of the United States is in the center and has an eagle as a finial. The other flags have spear finials.

— Purcell, John M. (2003). "American City Flags". Raven: A Journal of Vexillology. 9-10 (2002-2003). North American Vexillological Association: 221–223. ISSN 1071-0043.
