= Scott Jacoby (producer) =

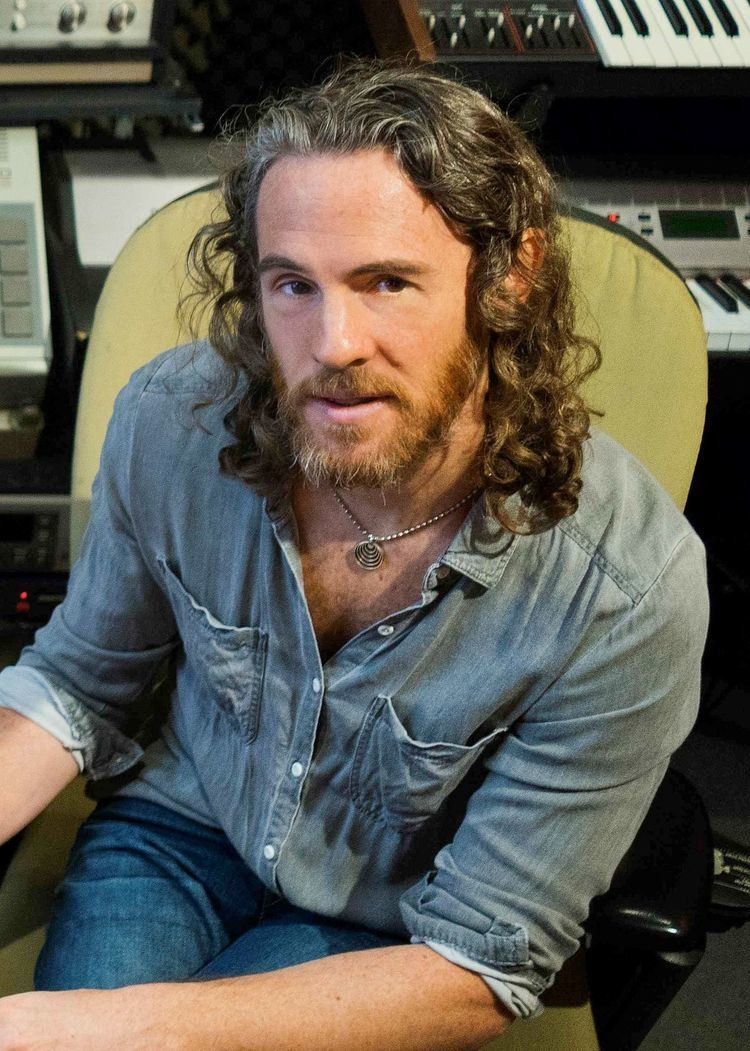

Background information
- Born: Scott Adam Jacoby; October 31, 1971 (age 54); New York City, New York, U.S.
- Genres: Pop; R&B; soul; dance; electronic; rock; jazz; folk; hip hop
- Occupations: Record producer; multi-instrumentalist; singer; composer; songwriter; mixer; engineer; record label executive
- Instruments: Piano; organ; drums; bass; guitar; vocals
- Years active: 2000–present
- Labels: Irma (2003–2007); Eusonia (2007–present)
- Website: scojac.com

Scott Adam Jacoby (born October 31, 1971) is an American record producer, songwriter, composer, sound engineer, and recording artist. He is a Grammy Award winner, and has worked with numerous artists in various genres including Coldplay, Cory Henry, Fabolous, Jackie Evancho, Janelle Monáe, Jason Mraz, John Legend, José James, Kane, Laura Izibor, Maiysha, Naturally 7, Rachel Platten, Ronnie Spector, Sia, Stormzy, Vampire Weekend and Vanessa Hudgens. In 2007, he founded his own record label Eusonia Records, and also established Eusonia Studios.

== Early life ==
Jacoby grew up in Rye, New York, and earned a degree in Psychology from Skidmore College in 1993. Afterwards, he attended Albert Einstein College of Medicine, but left his studies after two years to pursue a career in music.

== Career ==
In 2003, Jacoby signed a record deal with Irma Records to release his debut studio album, Before Now (in 2004). The album was then licensed to Columbia Music Entertainment in Japan, and the first single, "I Like You", went to number 1 on the Japanese radio charts. During this period, Jacoby also worked extensively in sound mixing, including work on the 2006 album, The Carnegie Hall Performance, Lewis Black's fifth album. The album won the Grammy Award for Best Comedy Album at the 49th Annual Grammy Awards, for which Jacoby shared in the Grammy win. In 2008, Columbia released Jacoby's sophomore studio album, After, which featured guest artists and writers, Maiysha, Andrew Wyatt, Jerome Collins of Straight No Chaser, Kevin Michael, and Shelly Peiken.

Despite success as a recording artist, Jacoby's primary focus throughout his career has been on writing, production and mixing. To that end, in 2000, he opened Maze Studios with Allen Towbin, which evolved to become Eusonia Studios in 2010, an "atmospherically inspiring setting" located in Manhattan's Flatiron District. In 2002, Jacoby established his own music production company, SCOJAC Music Productions. As of 2019, he was the president and CEO. Described as an "anti-specialist", he has worked most notably as a writer, producer, engineer, mixer and musician with numerous artists across a wide range of genres.

In 2011, Jacoby scored the Nicole Beharie film, My Last Day Without You, producing the theme song "My Last Day Without You". The song was a nominee at the 2012 Black Reel Awards for Best Original or Adapted Song. In 2013, Jacoby mixed the Vampire Weekend single "Unbelievers" with Emily Lazar of The Lodge; the song was a popular track on the album Modern Vampires of the City, winner of the 2014 Grammy Award for Best Alternative Music Album. In 2016, Jacoby produced Ronnie Spector's LP English Heart. Rolling Stone noted that the Spector's record, "helmed by producer Scott Jacoby... couldn't sound more different from her ex's dense, claustrophobic signature sound – and that's how she likes it". Jacoby also produced Deva Mahal's debut album Run Deep, released March 23, 2018. On the strength of this release, GRAMMY.com named Mahal their No. 1 in 'Best New Bands' from South by Southwest 2018.

=== Eusonia records ===
In 2007, Jacoby founded Eusonia Records, an independent record label, originally distributed by Ryko and later by RED. By 2008, Jacoby had signed progressive soul singer Maiysha to his label, and began collaborating with her on her first album, This Much is True. Jacoby co-wrote and produced the lead single from this album, "Wanna Be", which was nominated for a Grammy in 2009 in the Best Urban Alternative Performance category. As of 2019, the label had four artists on its roster: Jacoby, Maiysha, SiLyA and Zach Deputy, in addition to releasing the soundtrack for the 2013 film My Last Day Without You. In 2010, Jacoby teamed up with his partner James McKinney to run the label. In 2016, Eusonia partnered with the Anguilla Music Academy and the Grammy Museum to create the Music Revolution Project in Anguilla.

== Personal life ==
Jacoby speaks at music industry events and universities, as both a guest lecturer and a featured speaker. He has held various positions at the National Academy of Recording Arts and Sciences and in 2016 was the presenter of the Technical Grammy Award. As of 2019, he resided in Greenwich Village, New York City with his wife and daughters.

== Discography ==
=== Recording artist ===
Studio albums

- Before Now (2004)
- After (2008)

Other projects

- Evolution of Creation (as VMS Universe) (1996)
- Insert (with Allen Towbin as EJECT) (2000)

=== Producer, writer and mix engineer ===
The following is a select list of albums in which Jacoby has worked on as either producer, co-producer, composer, mixer or engineer, showing song title, year released, performing artist(s), album title and role.

Year	Title(s)	Artist(s)	Album	Label	Role
2002	"Do the Roo"	Disney Channel	Songs from the Book of Pooh	Walt Disney	Composer, producer
2003	"Right Way"	Maya Azucena	Maya Who?!	NuMedia NY	Producer
2004	Entire album	Scott Jacoby	Before Now	Irma	Primary artist, composer, producer, engineer, mixer
2004	"Baby"	Fabolous	Real Talk	Desert Storm, Atlantic	Additional keyboards
2005	Entire album	Jess Klein	Strawberry Lover	Rykodisc	Hammond organ, Wurlitzer piano
2006	Entire EP	Autumn	Sunshine (EP)	You	Producer
2006	Entire album	Lewis Black	The Carnegie Hall Performance (Note: The Carnegie Hall Performance won Best Comedy Album at the 49th Annual Grammy Awards in 2006.)	Comedy Central	Engineer
2006	"Can Ya Feel It?"	Naturally 7	Ready II Fly	Virgin Music Germany	Additional drum programming (Note: The drums for "Can Ya Feel It?" were co-programmed with Andrew Lefkowits.)
2006	"Feel It (In the Air Tonight)"	Naturally 7	Ready II Fly	Virgin Music Germany	Producer, drum programming, arrangement
2006	"Harder Than That"	Naturally 7	Ready II Fly	Virgin Music Germany	Drum programming
2006	"Never"	Naturally 7	Ready II Fly	Virgin Music Germany	Composer, (Note: "Never" was co-composed with Andrew Lefkowits and Jamal Reed.) producer, drum programming
2006	"4Life"	Naturally 7	Ready II Fly	Virgin Music Germany	Producer (Note: "4Life" was co-produced with Dwight Stewart and Kevin Deane.)
2006	"New York"	Naturally 7	Ready II Fly	Virgin Music Germany	Additional drum programming
2007	"Mmm…"	Laura Izibor	Tyler Perry's Why Did I Get Married? (Music from and Inspired by the Motion Picture)	Atlantic	Producer, engineer
2008	"Last Night"	Vanessa Hudgens	Identified	Hollywood	Producer, engineer, (Note: "Last Night" was co-engineered by Jason Coons.) drum programming, Wurlizter electric piano, electric guitar, Hammond organ
2008	Entire album	Scott Jacoby	After	Eusonia, Nippon Columbia	Primary artist, composer, producer, engineer, mixer, vocals, guitar, piano, clavinet, organ, Wurlitzer piano, Minimoog, drums, congas, percussion, drum programming
2008	Entire album	Kane	Everything You Want	Universal	Producer, mixer, backing vocals
2008	Entire album	Maiysha	This Much Is True (Note: "Wanna Be", the second track from This Much Is True, was nominated for Best Urban/Alternative Performance at the 51st Annual Grammy Awards in 2009.)	Eusonia	Executive producer, producer, engineer, mixer, drum programming, instrumentation
2008	"Damned"	Eva Avila	Give Me the Music	Sony BMG Canada	Composer (Note: "Damned" was co-composed with Greg Johnston, Luke McMaster and Sherry St. Germain.)
2009	"Perfect World"	Laura Izibor	Let the Truth Be Told	Atlantic	Producer, engineer, drum programming, additional mixing
2009	"The Worst Is Over"	Laura Izibor	Let the Truth Be Told	Atlantic	Producer, engineer, mixer
2009	"Yes (I'll Be Your Baby)"	Laura Izibor	Let the Truth Be Told	Atlantic	Producer, engineer, drum programming, additional mixing, bass, clavinet, drums, organ, Wurlitzer piano, string arrangement (Note: The strings for "Yes (I'll Be Your Baby)" were co-arranged with Laura Izibor and Steve Lunt.)
2009	"I Don't Want You Back"	Laura Izibor	Let the Truth Be Told	Atlantic	Producer, engineer, mixer, drum programming, drums, organ
2009	"Mmm…"	Laura Izibor	Let the Truth Be Told	Atlantic	Producer, engineer
2010	"Touch"	José James	Blackmagic	Brownswood, Beat	Mixer
2010	"Warrior"	José James	Blackmagic	Brownswood, Beat	Mixer
2010	"Save Your Love for Me"	José James	Blackmagic	Brownswood, Beat	Mixer
2010	"The Greater Good"	José James	Blackmagic	Brownswood, Beat	Mixer
2010	"Beauty"	José James	Blackmagic	Brownswood, Beat	Mixer
2010	Entire album	Chimène	Laisse-les dire	AZ, Universal	Producer, mixer
2010	Entire album	Carolyn Malachi	Lions, Fires, Squares (Note: "Orion", the second track from Lions, Fires, Squares, was nominated for Best Urban/Alternative Performance at the 53rd Annual Grammy Awards in 2010.)	Self-released	Mixer
2010	Entire album	José James, Jef Neve	For All We Know (Note: For All We Know won the Prix du Jazz Vocal (Vocal Jazz Award) at the Prix de l'Académie du Jazz in 2010.)	Impulse!	Mixer
2010	Entire album	Billy White	First Things First	Porto Franco	Mixer, mastering (Note: First Things First was co-mixed and mastered with Alex Bilowitz.)
2011	Entire album	SiLyA	Peel Away	Eusonia	Producer, mixer
2011	Entire album	Kane	Singles Only	Universal, Kane	Producer, mixer
2011	"All I Seem to Do"	Rachel Platten	Be Here	Rock Ridge	Mixer
2011	"You Don't Have to Go"	Rachel Platten	Be Here	Rock Ridge	Mixer
2011	"Nothing Ever Happens"	Rachel Platten	Be Here	Rock Ridge	Mixer
2011	Entire album	Zach Deputy	Another Day	Eusonia	Producer, mixer
2012	Entire album	Cory Henry	Gotcha Now Doc	Self-released	Mixer, mastering
2012	"Spaceship"	Nicki Richards	Tell Me…	Not On Label	Additional vocals
2013	"Trouble"	José James	No Beginning No End	Blue Note	Composer (Note: "Trouble" was co-composed with José James.)
2013	Entire album	Vigon Bamy Jay	Les Soul Men	323	Producer, mixer
2013	"Unbelievers"	Vampire Weekend	Modern Vampires of the City (Note: Modern Vampires of the City won Best Alternative Music Album at the 56th Annual Grammy Awards in 2013.)	XL	Mixer (Note: "Unbelievers" was co-mixed with Emily Lazar.)
2013	Entire album	Olympe	Olympe	Fontana, Mercury	Producer, mixer
2013	Entire album	Nicole Beharie, various artists	My Last Day Without You: Original Motion Picture Soundtrack	Eusonia	Composer, producer
2014	Entire album	School Is Cool	Nature Fear	Sony Music Belgium, Wilderness	Mixer
2014	Entire album	Olympe	Une vie par jour	Mercury	Producer, mixer
2014	"Alexandra"	Hamilton Leithauser	Black Hours	Ribbon	Mixer
2014	"Pop That Truck"	Chuck Brown	Beautiful Life	Raw Venture	Mixer
2014	Entire album	Heffron Drive	Happy Mistakes	TOLBooth	Mixer
2015	"Keep the Customer Satisfied"	Naturally 7	Hidden in Plain Sight, Vox Maximus Vol. 1	Hidden Beach	Producer, mixer
2015	"Can't Take the Credit"	Naturally 7	Hidden in Plain Sight, Vox Maximus Vol. 1	Hidden Beach	Producer, mixer
2015	"Put You on to this"	Naturally 7	Hidden in Plain Sight, Vox Maximus Vol. 1	Hidden Beach	Producer, mixer
2015	"Need You with Me"	Naturally 7	Hidden in Plain Sight, Vox Maximus Vol. 1	Hidden Beach	Producer, mixer
2015	"Mahalia"	Naturally 7	Hidden in Plain Sight, Vox Maximus Vol. 1	Hidden Beach	Producer, mixer
2015	"Take It (Golden Gates)"	Naturally 7	Hidden in Plain Sight, Vox Maximus Vol. 1	Hidden Beach	Producer, mixer
2015	"Colors"	Vérité	Sentiment (EP)	Not On Label, Turntable Kitchen	Mixer (Note: "Colors" was co-mixed with Jack Dine and Zach Nicita.)
2015	Entire EP	Rachel Brown	The Band (EP)	Anavista	Producer, mixer
2016	"Congratulations"	Rachel Platten	Wildfire	Columbia, Sony Music	Composer (Note: "Congratulations" was co-composed with Rachel Platten and Jon Levine.)
2016	Entire album	Cory Henry	The Revival	GroundUP, Universal	Mixer
2016	Entire album	Ronnie Spector	English Heart	429	Producer, mixer
2016	Entire album	Coldplay	A Head Full of Dreams (5.1 Surround Mix)	Parlophone, Atlantic	Mixer
2017	"The Week of the Disaster"	The Kin	Modern Primitive	Self-released	Composer, producer, mixer
2017	"Underneath It All"	The Kin	Modern Primitive	Self-released	Composer, producer, mixer
2017	"Live Your Fantasy"	José James	Love in a Time of Madness	Blue Note	Composer, engineer, (Note: "Live Your Fantasy" was co-engineered with Jack Dine.) keyboards, synthesizer
2017	"Blinded by Your Grace, Pt. 2"	Stormzy	Gang Signs & Prayer	#Merky	Engineer
2017	Entire album	White Willow	Future Hopes	The Laser's Edge	Additional engineer
2017	Entire album	Lesley Kernochan	A Calm Sun	Maple Syrup Music	Producer, mixer, engineer
2017	"Lu Guistacofane”	Canzoniere Grecanico Salentino	Canzoniere	Ponderosa	Composer, producer
2018	Entire album	Deva Mahal	Run Deep	Motéma Music	Composer, producer, mixer
2018	"Blunder"	Michael Blume	cynicism & sincerity	S-Curve Records	Co-producer, engineer, keyboards
2018	"Have It All" (Easy Star All-Stars Reggae Mix)	Jason Mraz	Know	Atlantic	Mixer
2018	Entire album	As Is	Here's to Life	Self-released	Engineer, mixer
2018	Entire album	Cory Henry & The Funk Apostles	Art of Love	Self-released	Co-producer, engineer
2018	"Born to Try"	Part-Time Friends	Streets and Stories	Sony Music	Mixer
2018	"I Like That" (Easy Star All-Stars Reggae Mix)	Janelle Monae	Dirty Computer	Atlantic	Mixer
2018	"Ain't No Sunshine"	Kori Withers	Melting	Self-released	Producer, engineer, Mixer
2018	"Grandma's Hands" Acoustic Version	Jose James	Lean On Me	Blue Note	Producer, engineer, Mixer
2019	Entire album	Marvin Jouno	Sur Mars	Un Plan Simple	Mixer
2019	"Heat" (Easy All-Stars Reggae Mix)	Kelly Clarkson	Meaning of Life	Atlantic	Mixer
2019	Entire album	Elisa Jo	Kicks	Universal	Producer, Mixer
2019	"Waves"	Saul Rivers	single	Self-released	Producer, Mixer
2019	Entire EP	Ben l'Oncle Soul	Ben.	Blue Note	Mixer
2019	Entire album	Lesley Kernochan	Hummingbird Revolution	Make My Day	Producer, Mixer
2019	"Orange Trees" (Easy Star All-Stars Reggae Mix)	Marina	Love + Fear	Warner	Mixer
2019	Entire album	Cast Recording (various artists)	Cleopatra, The Musical Experience	Broadway Records	Engineer

==== Film and television ====
The following is a list of films, television series and commercials in which Jacoby has worked on as either producer, co-producer, composer, mixer or engineer, showing title/client, project type, role and year released.

Year	Title / Client	Type	Role	Ref
2002	The Book of Pooh / Disney	Series	Composer, producer	
2003	Old Navy	Commercial	Composer, producer	
2003	JanSport	Commercial	Composer, producer	
2005	Confess	Film	Composer	
2010	Escape from Havana / CNBC	Documentary	Composer	
2011	My Last Day Without You (Note: My Last Day Without You won Best Independent Feature at the Black Reel Awards of 2012.)	Film	Composer, producer	
2013	The Immigrant	Film	Engineer	
2016	Policing the Police (Frontline) / PBS	Documentary	Composer	
