= Eusonia Records =

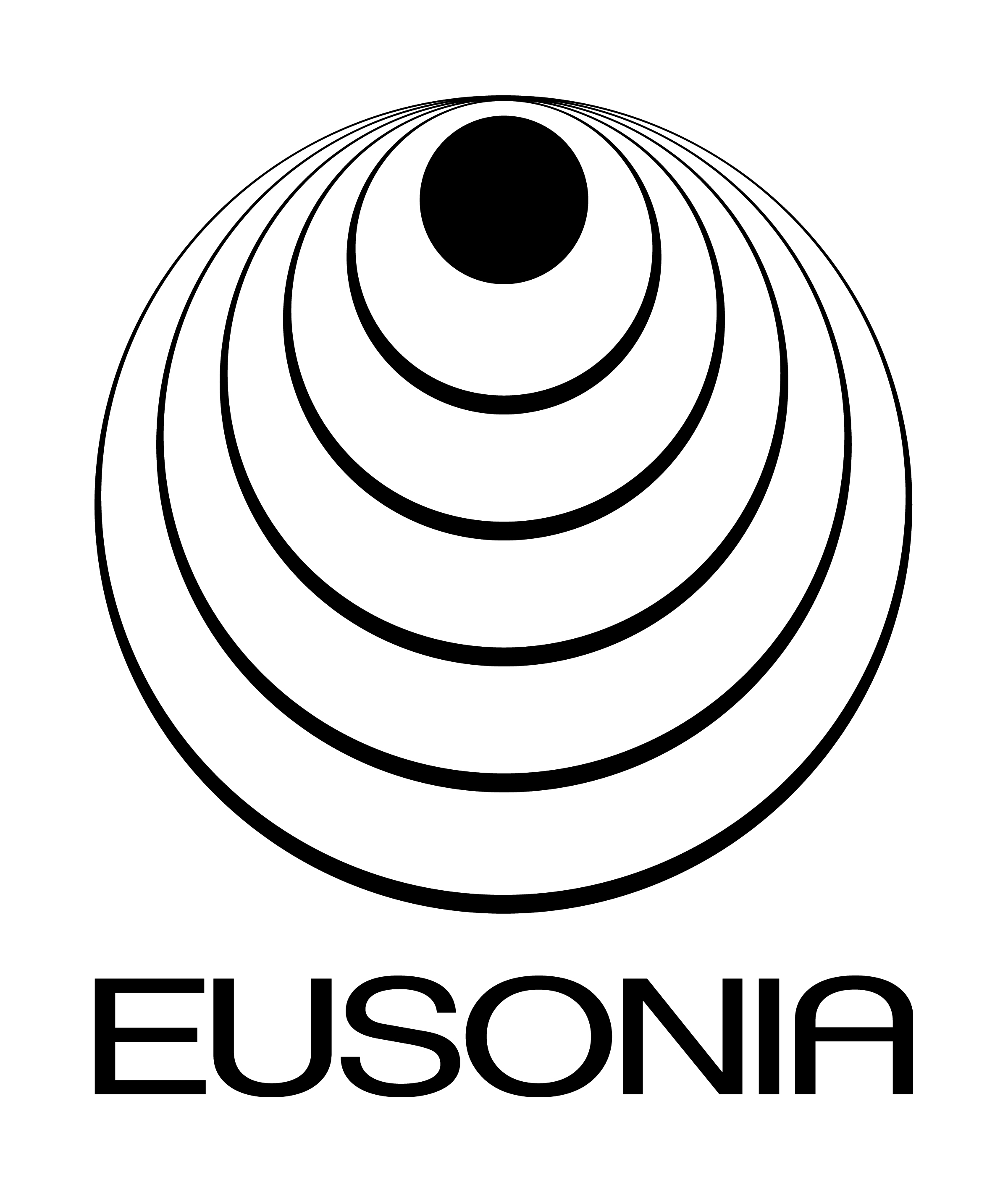
- Founded: 2007
- Founder: Scott Jacoby
- Distributor: RED
- Country of origin: United States
- Location: New York City
- Official website: www.eusonia.com

Eusonia Records is an independent record label founded by American record producer, songwriter and multi-instrumentalist Scott Jacoby. The label currently has four artists on its roster: Maiysha, SiLyA, Zach Deputy and Jacoby himself, as well as the soundtrack for the 2013 film My Last Day Without You.

Eusonia Records releases are primarily recorded and mixed at its recording facility, Eusonia Studios, in Manhattan.

== Etymology ==
In an interview with ASCAP in 2011, Jacoby stated that the word "eusonia" borrows from Greek and Latin, and means "home of good music".

== History ==
Jacoby founded Eusonia Records in 2007 with capital that he raised from family and friends. The label earned its first Grammy nomination when "Wanna Be", from Maiysha's debut studio album This Much Is True, was nominated for Best Urban/Alternative Performance in 2009. In 2010, Jacoby teamed up with his partner James McKinney to run the label as its chief operating officer (COO).

In 2016, Eusonia partnered with the Anguilla Music Academy and The Grammy Museum to create the Music Revolution Project in Anguilla.

== Releases ==
Year	Artist(s)	Release	Type	Release date
2008	Scott Jacoby	After	Album	July 2, 2008
2008	Maiysha	This Much Is True (Note: "Wanna Be", the second track from This Much Is True, was nominated for Best Urban/Alternative Performance at the 51st Annual Grammy Awards in 2009.)	Album	August 26, 2008
2009	Maiysha	Sledgehammer	EP	May 12, 2009
2010	Maiysha	UnderCover	Album	June 22, 2010
2011	SiLyA	Peel Away	Album	August 23, 2011
2011	Zach Deputy	Another Day	Album	September 27, 2011
2013	Nicole Beharie, various artists	My Last Day Without You: Original Motion Picture Soundtrack (Note: "My Last Day Without You", the final track from My Last Day Without You: Original Motion Picture Soundtrack, was nominated for Best Original or Adapted Song at the Black Reel Awards of 2012.)	Album	November 5, 2013
