= Vigon =

Vigon may refer to:

- Vigon (singer), real name Abdelghafour Mouhsine, French-Moroccan R&B singer, part of the trio Vigon Bamy Jay
- Brad Vigon (born 1969), Australian ice hockey player
- Juan Vigón (1880–1955), Spanish general who fought in the Spanish Civil War
