= Sex: The Revolution =

American documentary miniseries

- Genre: Documentary series
- Written by: Martin Torgoff
- Directed by: Hart Perry
- Starring: David Crosby, Phil Donahue, Hugh Hefner, Erica Jong, Ariel Levy, Gloria Steinem, et al.
- Composers: Steve Jordan, Matthew Houser, Meegan Voss
- Country of origin: United States
- Original language: English
- No. of seasons: 1
- No. of episodes: 4

Production
- Executive producers: Brad Abramson, Michael Hirschorn, Lynne Kirby, Stephen Mintz, et al.
- Producer: Richard Lowe
- Cinematography: Hart Perry, Robert Teten, Holt Haynsworth
- Editors: François Keraudren, Jason Schmidt
- Production company: Perry Films

Original release
- Network: VH1
- Release: May 12 – May 15, 2008

Sex: The Revolution is a four-part 2008 American documentary miniseries that aired on VH1 and The Sundance Channel. It chronicles the rise of American interest in sexuality from the 1950s through the 1990s.

The version shown on VH1 was pixelated to censor nudity including in discussions of censorship of nudity. VH1 Latin America aired the uncensored version.

== Episodes ==
"Save It 'Til Marriage:" first aired Monday, May 12, 2008, focused on sexual repression of the 1950s

"The Big Bang:" first aired Tuesday, May 13, 2008, the sexual explosion of the 1960s

"Do Your Thing:" first aired Wednesday, May 14, 2008, the sexual independence of the 1970s

"Tainted Love:" first aired Thursday, May 15, 2008, the tail end of the revolution during the late 1970s and early 1980s. And the beginning of AIDS.

== Key topics ==
- The Kinsey Report
- Playboy
- Rock and Roll
- Citizens for Decent Literature
- The Pill
- Sex and the Single Girl
- Playboy Clubs
- the Generation Gap
- Beatniks
- Free Speech vs. Filthy Speech
- Sexual Freedom League
- Hippies and the Summer of Love
- Protest culture
- Civil Rights Movement
- the Vietnam War
- Abbie Hoffman
- the Abortion debate
- the Strip Club
- Sex as marketing tool
- Sexploitation
- the new Film Code
- Sex on Broadway (Oh! Calcutta!)
- Masters and Johnson
  - Human sexual response cycle
  - Human Sexual Inadequacy
- Swingers
- Urban Swingers
- Esalen Institute
- Encounter groups
  - Bob & Carol & Ted & Alice
- New attitudes towards sexuality in the middle class
- Linda LeClair and Barnard College
- Women's Equality
  - Bra burning
- Efforts against the Sexual Revolution
- Midnight Cowboy
- Woodstock
- Feminism and Gay Liberation
  - Stonewall Riots
  - The removal of Homosexuality from the list of mental illnesses
  - Fire Island
  - Fear of Flying
- Roe v. Wade
- Sandstone Retreat
- Wide-release pornography
  - Porno Chic
  - Deep Throat
  - Behind the Green Door
    - Marilyn Chambers
- the Castro District and the rise of Gay Villages in many major cities.
- Harvey Milk
  - Assassination of Milk and George Moscone
  - the Castro Riots
- Anita Bryant vs. Homosexuality
- Anti-feminist Movement
- Disco
  - Studio 54
  - Plato's Retreat
  - Cocaine and Quaaludes
  - The Village People
    - Gay bathhouses
- the modern pornographic magazine
  - Full-frontal nudity
  - Hustler Magazine
  - Penthouse Magazine
  - "showing pink"
  - Anti-pornography campaign
- The Rolling Stones "Black and Blue Billboard"
- Rise in Divorce Rates
  - Kramer vs. Kramer
- The Backlash
  - Dressed to Kill
  - Cruising
  - Looking for Mr. Goodbar
  - The rise of the Religious Right
  - The US presidential election of Ronald Reagan
- VD and STDs
  - Genital herpes
- AIDS
  - "the gay disease"
  - The death of Rock Hudson
- the Meese Commission
  - "I know it when I see it"
- Fatal Attraction
- the notion of safe sex
- Repercussions and positive changes as a result of the revolution in the new century.
  - Internet Pornography
  - Reality Television
  - Sexual imagery in the media.
  - Increased acceptance and visibility of gays and lesbians
  - Sexual harassment in the work place.
  - Increased awareness and concern over domestic violence.
  - Change in gender roles in society.
