= Non-fiction (disambiguation) =

Non-fiction, or nonfiction, is an account or representation of a subject which is presented as existent outside of fantasy.

Non-fiction or nonfiction may also refer to:

== Music ==
- "Non Fiction", a 2005 song by the Pillows
- Non Phixion, an American hip hop group
- "Nonfiction" (song), a 2022 song by Ayumi Hamasaki

=== Albums ===
- Non-Fiction (Steve Kuhn album), 1978
- Non-Fiction (Bob Bennett album), 1985
- Non-Fiction (Black Sheep album), 1994
- Non-Fiction (Naturally 7 album), 2000
- Non-Fiction (Ne-Yo album), 2015

== Other media ==
- Stranger than Fiction: True Stories, a 2004 book by Chuck Palahniuk also published under the title Nonfiction
- Non-Fiction (film), a 2018 French comedy film

== See also ==
- True Story (disambiguation)
