= Christopher Bevans =

American fashion designer and creative director

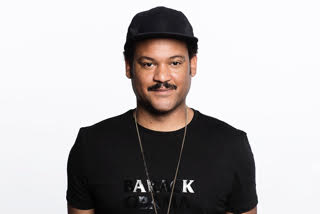
- Born: December 22, 1972 (age 53); Brooklyn, New York City
- Education: Fashion Institute of Technology
- Occupations: Fashion designer, creative director
- Label: DYNE
- Website: dyne.life

Christopher Bevans (born 22 December 1972) is an American fashion designer and creative director. He was born in Brooklyn, New York City and went on to work in the fashion industry like his grandmother. Bevans has won awards from organizations such as Woolmark.

== Early life and education ==
Christopher Bevans was born in Brooklyn, New York City to parents of Jamaican and Belizean descent. He grew up in Rochester, New York, graduating from Gates Chili High School in 1991. His grandmother was a dressmaker in the 1960s and 70s. Bevans grew up around her business and industry, which caused him to become interested. While doing art, he would ask his grandmother for both assistance and materials. He and his family moved out of the city for a period of time while his father got a job with Kodak. Bevans started as an apprentice to a tailor as a teenager and became the shop's owner at 19. Bevans was the sole owner of a shoe repair shop, which did not do well, with Bevans owing this to his inexperience in running a small business.

Bevans returned to New York City for his education, majoring in textiles at the Fashion Institute of Technology (FIT) and working as a freelance tailor in fashion and advertising, including Ang Lee's work for BMW Films and as a dresser at Bryant Park.

== Career ==
After college, Bevans developed his skills as a designer for Sean John, where he worked on the CFDA award-winning 2004 collection, and as a senior designer for Rocawear.

Additionally, Bevans created his own line of custom menswear for celebrities, including Prince, Jay Z and John Legend.

Bevans moved to Portland, Oregon in 2006 to join Nike as global design director of urban apparel. At Nike, he led the design of the Air Force 1 25th Anniversary campaign, the Blue Ribbon Sports collection, Roger Federer's "RF" logo.

In 2012, Bevans became creative director of Billionaire Boys Club, the clothing line established by Pharrell Williams and Nigo.

In 2013, Bevans was chosen by MIT Media Lab Director Joi Ito to be part of the inaugural Director's Fellows program, defined by Ito as "extraordinary individuals from a broad range of sectors and geographies to join us in doing collaborative research and to expand our growing global community."

Bevans joined speakers at the Media Lab's first Platform Summit, to address an audience of business and thought leaders in science, technology, finance, politics, education, media, design and the arts. He regularly lectures on mentorship and design, most notably for Cooper Hewitt and Art Dubai's Global Art Forum.

Since 2014, Bevans is working with Seattle Seahawks running back Marshawn Lynch and Relativity Media to develop the Beast Mode brand, clothing and accessories line.

In 2015, Bevans introduced DYNE, his debut line of tailored, technologically advanced sportswear, at Men's Fashion Week in New York City. DYNE has been in the work for years, and Bevans cites his love for technology, fabrics, sports, electronics, and tailoring. Bevans partnered with Google Cloud and Bemis Associates to debut their SS19 RTW collection during the New York Fashion Week Men's. DYNE-brand clothing features NFC chips embedded in them to provide information about the clothing and access playlists.

Bevans was the creative director for Milan Fashion Week: Men's in 2019, for which he was praised as a good choice by Fashion United. He also collaborated with sustainable fashion brand "Save the Duck" in 2018.

Bevans created an installation for his fall collection at his alma mater at FIT, being inspired to do so by having gotten his degree from the institute. In April 2019, Bevans participated as a judge in the Fashion Institute of Technology's Future of Fashion show. Bevans has also been a judge at the Green Carpet Fashion Awards, an awards show relating to sustainability.

Other clients Bevans has worked with include P. Diddy, Kanye West, Pharrell, A$AP Rocky, Adidas, and Under Armour.

== Awards and accolades ==
In 2017, Bevans won International Woolmark Prize regional final. He was also awarded Woolwork's Innovation Award for his 1980s-inspired snowboard outfit created under DYNE in January 2018. He was given AUS$100,000 as part of this award. One Woolmark Prize judge, Livia Firth, praised as an example of "young designers" who are "changing the conversation." Bevans was named an honoree of the BE (Black Enterprise) Modern Man program. To commemorate Black History Month, Willamette Week listed Bevans among others as examples of black people who have made strides in the Portland fashion industry. He was featured in an article in and on the cover of Women's Wear Daily.

The Council of Fashion Designers of America admitted Bevans to its 493-large organization, which only adds new members once per year. The Root writer Maiysha praised the induction of Bevans as well as Venus Williams as a sign of progress for the organization on admittance of black people.
