= 12th Annual Black Reel Awards =

Film-industry awards in 2012

12th Black Reel Awards
- Date: February 9, 2012
- Location: Washington, D.C.

The 2012 Black Reel Awards, which annually recognize and celebrate the achievements of black people in feature, independent and television films, took place in Washington, D.C., on February 9, 2012. While the film Pariah had the most nominations with nine, The Help was the big winner taking home six out of the seven awards for which it was nominated. Attack the Block and Shame were also multiple winners, with each winning two awards. Octavia Spencer, Viola Davis and Steve McQueen also won two awards apiece.

== Winners and nominees ==
Winners are listed first and highlighted in bold.

Best Film	Best Director
**The Help**; Attack the Block; Jumping the Broom; Pariah; Shame	**Steve McQueen – Shame**; Salim Akil – Jumping the Broom; Qasim Basir – Mooz-lum; Ava DuVernay – I Will Follow; Dee Rees – Pariah
Best Actor	Best Actress
**John Boyega – Attack the Block**; Laz Alonso – Jumping the Broom; Demián Bichir – A Better Life; Oliver Litondo – The First Grader; Evan Ross – Mooz-lum	**Viola Davis – The Help**; Naomie Harris – Attack the Block; Nia Long – Mooz-lum; Adepero Oduye – Pariah; Zoe Saldaña – Colombiana
Best Supporting Actor	Best Supporting Actress
**Don Cheadle – The Guard**; Mike Epps – Jumping the Broom; Laurence Fishburne – Contagion; Anthony Mackie – The Adjustment Bureau; Isiah Whitlock Jr. – Cedar Rapids	**Octavia Spencer – The Help**; Angela Bassett – Jumping the Broom; Maya Rudolph – Bridesmaids; Pernell Walker – Pariah; Kim Wayans – Pariah
Best Breakthrough Performance	Best Ensemble (Awarded to Casting Directors)
**Adepero Oduye – Pariah**; John Boyega – Attack the Block; Gugu Mbatha-Raw – Larry Crowne; Octavia Spencer – The Help; Kim Wayans – Pariah	**Kerry Barden and Paul Schnee – The Help**; Eyde Belasco – Pariah; Tracy Byrd – Jumping the Broom; Aleta Chappelle – Mooz-lum; Nina Gold – Attack the Block; Debra Zane – Fast Five
Best Original or Adapted Song	Outstanding Original Score
**"The Living Proof" from The Help – Performed by Mary J. Blige**; "My Last Day Without You" from My Last Day Without You – Performed by Nicole Beharie; "Fly Love" from Rio – Performed by Jamie Foxx; "Walkin' Blues" from Footloose – Performed by Cee-Lo Green and Kenny Wayne Shepherd; "Furiously Dangerous" from Fast Five – Performed by Ludacris	**Thomas Newman – The Help**; Harry Escott – Shame; Alex Heffes – The First Grader; Steven Price – Attack the Block; Misha Segal – Mooz-lum
Best Screenplay, Adapted or Original	Best Independent Short
**Steve McQueen and Abi Morgan – Shame**; Qasim Basir – Mooz-lum; Ava DuVernay – I Will Follow; Elizabeth Hunter and Arlene Gibbs – Jumping the Broom; Dee Rees – Pariah	**Wake – Bree Newsome**; The Abyss Boys – Jan-Hendrik Beetge; Fig – Ryan Coogler; The Tombs – Jerry Lamothe; Wolf Call – Rob Underhill
Best Feature Documentary	Best Independent Documentary
**Beats, Rhymes & Life: The Travels of A Tribe Called Quest – Michael Rapaport**; Being Elmo: A Puppeteer's Journey – Constance Marks; The Black Power Mixtape 1967-1975 – Göran Hugo Olsson; The Interrupters – Steve James; Undefeated – Daniel Lindsay and T. J. Martin	**Infiltrating Hollywood: The Rise and Fall of the Spook Who Sat By the Door – Christine Acham and Clifford Ward**; Brown Babies – Regina Griffin; Burn: The Evolution of An American City – Harold Jackson III; Gang Girl: A Mother's Journey to Save Her Daughter – Valerie Goodloe; The Manuscripts of Timbuktu – Zola Maseko; Zero Percent – Tim Skousen
Best Independent Feature	Best Foreign Film
**My Last Day Without You – Stefan Schaefer**; Besouro – João Daniel Tikhomiroff; Billy – Peter Burger; Mamitas – Nicholas Ozeki; The Tested – Russell Costanzo	**Attack the Block (U.K.) – Nira Park and James Wilson**; The First Grader (U.K.) – Sam Feuer, Richard Harding and Nicola Blacker; Kinyarwanda (Rwanda) – Darren Dean and Tommy Oliver; Life, Above All (South Africa) – Oliver Schmitz; Viva Riva! (Congo) – Steven Markovitz and Djo Tunda Wa Munga
Best Television Documentary or Special	Best Television Miniseries or Movie
**Richard Lowe and Martin Torgoff – Planet Rock: The Story of Hip Hop and the Crack Generation (VH1)**; Henry Louis Gates Jr. – Black in Latin America (PBS); Jason Hehir – The Fab Five (ESPN); Ingrid Duran and Catherine Pino – The Latino List (HBO); Abigail Disney – Pray the Devil Back to Hell (PBS)	**Thurgood (HBO) – Bill Haber and George Stevens Jr.**; Five (Lifetime) – Jennifer Aniston, Marta Kauffman and Paula Wagner; Luther (BBC America) – Katie Swinden; The Sunset Limited (HBO) – Barbara Hall; Taken from Me: The Tiffany Rubin Story (Lifetime) – Harvey Kahn
Best Actor in a TV Movie or Limited Series	Best Actress in a TV Movie or Limited Series
**Idris Elba – Luther (BBC America)**; Eric Benét – Trinity Goodheart (UP); Laurence Fishburne – Thurgood (HBO); Samuel L. Jackson – The Sunset Limited (HBO); Mykelti Williamson – Have a Little Faith (ABC)	**Taraji P. Henson – Taken from Me: The Tiffany Rubin Story (Lifetime)**; Rosario Dawson – Five (Lifetime); Jenifer Lewis – Five (Lifetime); Anika Noni Rose – Bag of Bones (A&E Network); Tracee Ellis Ross – Five (Lifetime)
