= Scott Jacoby =

Scott Jacoby may refer to:

- Scott Jacoby (producer) (born 1971), American record producer
- Scott Jacoby (actor) (born 1956), American actor
