= Ethan Nadelmann =

American writer and campaigner for marijuana's legalization

Ethan A. Nadelmann
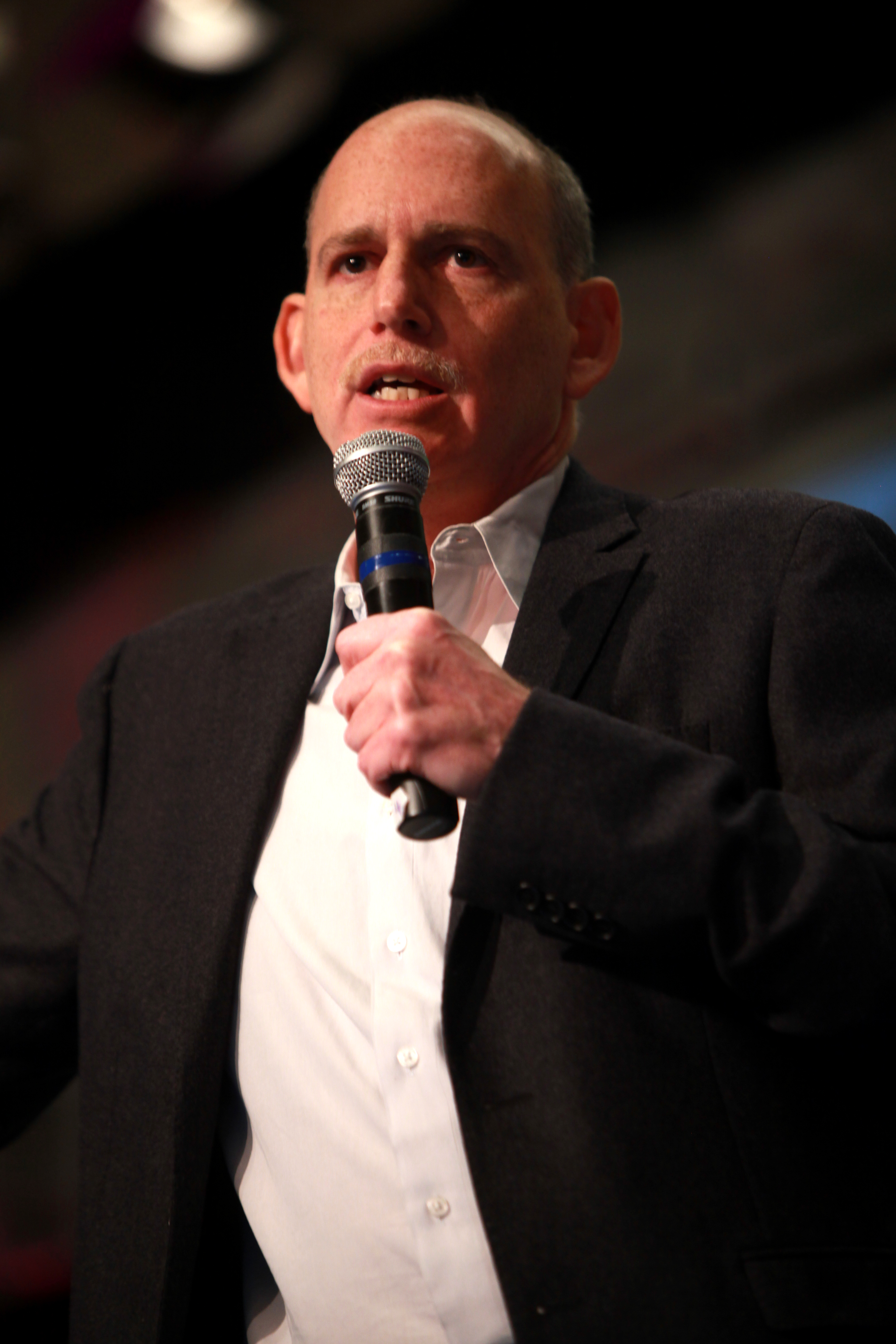
- Nadelmann in 2014
- Born: March 13, 1957 (age 69); New York City
- Education: Harvard University (Ph.D.); London School of Economics (M.Sc); Harvard Law School (J.D.); Harvard University (B.A.); McGill University (transferred to Harvard)
- Occupations: Founder, Drug Policy Alliance
- Website: Ethan Nadelmann

Ethan A. Nadelmann (born March 13, 1957) is the founder of the Drug Policy Alliance, a New York City-based non-profit organization working to end the war on drugs. He is a supporter of the legalization of marijuana in America.

== Early life ==
Nadelmann was born in New York City and raised in Westchester, New York in a Jewish family; his father, Ludwig Nadelmann, was a rabbi and a "leading figure in the Jewish Reconstructionist movement." He earned B.A., J.D., and Ph.D. degrees from Harvard University and a M.Sc in international relations from the London School of Economics. Nadelmann began to see the flaws in American drug policy as a college student. His academic interests initially focused on Middle East politics before he devoted himself to the issue of drug policy and the internationalization of crime law enforcement. In 1984-85, while pursuing his Ph.D., Nadelmann "got a security clearance and worked as a consultant to the State Department's Bureau of International Narcotics and Law Enforcement Affairs," then called the Bureau of International Narcotics Matters. Nadelmann's dissertation, based in part on "hundreds of DEA and foreign drug-enforcement officials" in 19 countries, was subsequently published as "Cops Across Borders: The Internationalization of U.S. Criminal Law Enforcement." Reviewing the book in Foreign Affairs, David C. Hendrickson called it a "pioneering and prodigiously researched work." Hendrickson commented on how Nadelmann didn't criticize drug policies in the book, writing, "The work contains little in the way of normative judgments or policy prescriptions. Given Nadelmann's known objections to the war on drugs, this gives the book an odd character, quite as if the Rev. Pat Robertson were to attempt a detached scientific analysis of the production values in Last Tango in Paris." Nadelmann then began to focus on the "harms created by drug prohibition" as he taught politics and public affairs at Princeton University from 1987 to 1994.

== Career ==
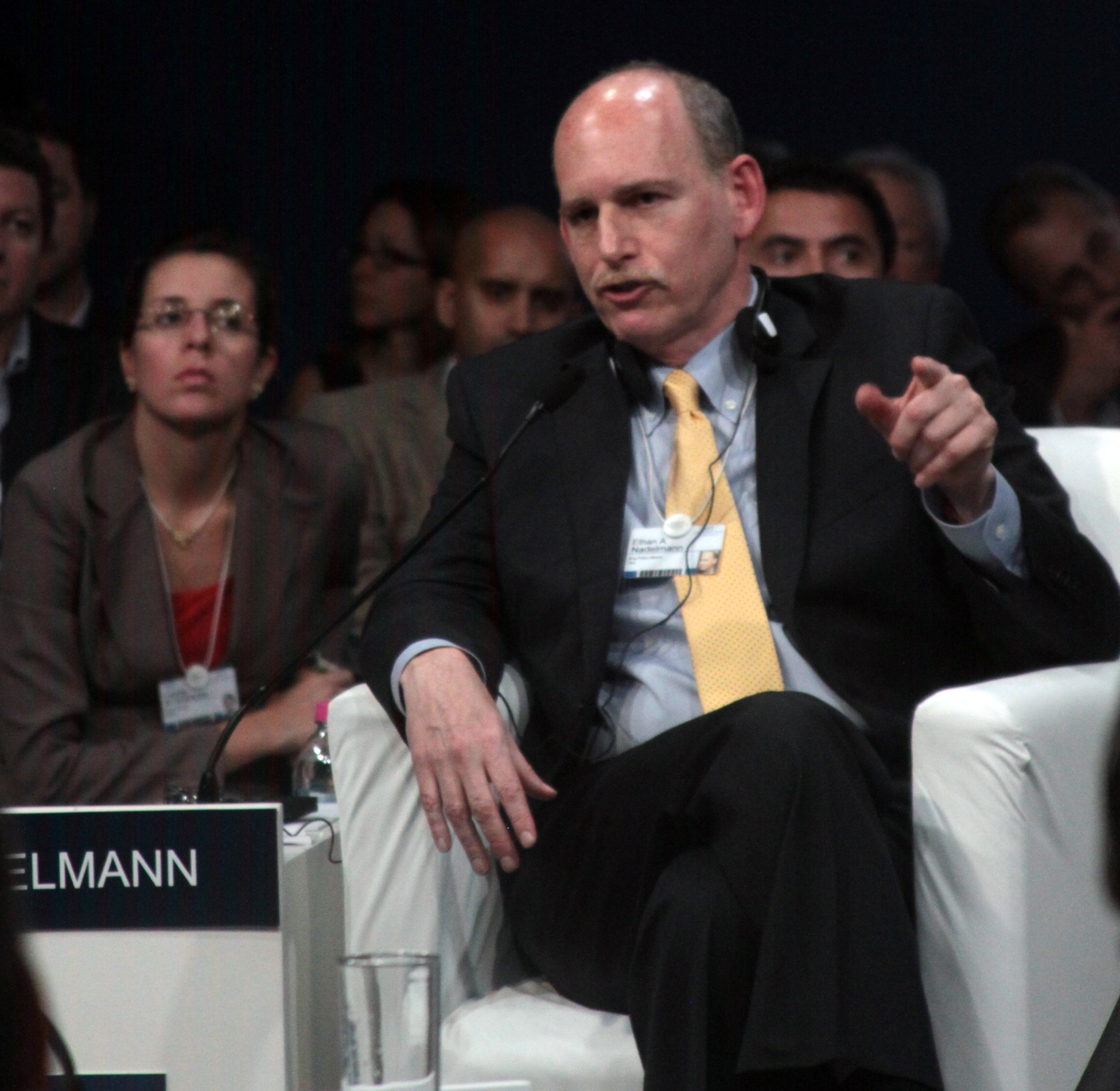
Ethan Nadelmann at the World Economic Forum on Latin America in 2012

While he was at Princeton, Nadelmann lectured and wrote extensively on drug policy, starting with a piece in Foreign Policy in April 1988 called "U. S. Drug Policy: A Bad Export." In the article, Nadelmann argued that U.S. drug policy strained relationships with Latin American countries, and Nadelmann "analyzed legalization as an alternative." The article brought Nadelmann media attention alongside Kurt Schmoke, a Baltimore Mayor who advocated for drug decriminalization. Nadelmann appeared on TV shows including Nightline, where he and Schmoke debated Charles Rangel on drugs, and Larry King Live. Nadelmann then "authored similar articles Science, The Public Interest, and New Republic," which were often quoted in op-ed articles about drug policy. Nadelmann's scholarly work provided the intellectual foundation for the legalization effort, and it was responsible for the cross-pollination of varying views on legalization, from libertarian arguments to ones concerning the fiscal burden of the war on drugs.

Nadelmann formed the Princeton Working Group on the Future of Drug Use and Alternatives to Drug Prohibition. The group included eighteen scholars including Lester Grinspoon, Andrew Weil, and Alexander T. Shulgin. Martin Torgoff wrote in Can't Find my Way Home that "for a brief time, the Princeton Group was the most dynamic de facto drug-reform think tank in the United States."

After Barack Obama won the presidential election, Matt Elrod, the director of the drug policy reform group DrugSense, filed an internet petition for Ethan Nadelmann as the new Drug Czar. Although any hopes in getting Nadelmann appointed were downplayed, "this petition will at least encourage President-elect Obama to think twice about his choice of drug czar." Drug Policy Alliance never lobbied for Nadelmann, but once media reports alleged that James Ramstad (R-MN) would be appointed to the post, the organization urged people to oppose the appointment due to his opposition to medical marijuana and needle exchange among other things. Seattle's police chief Gil Kerlikowske became the next head of the White House Office of National Drug Control Policy (ONDCP).

On September 28, 2012, Nadelmann spoke at the Human Rights Foundation's San Francisco Freedom Forum. He discussed the United States' incarceration rates, which are at 743 people per 100,000 inhabitants, and how America's drug policies are affecting that number.

=== Drug Policy Alliance ===
Nadelmann founded the Lindesmith Center in 1994, a drug policy institute created with the support of George Soros. In Soros: The Life and Times of a Messianic Billionaire, Michael T. Kaufman wrote of Nadelmann and Soros's relationship, which formed after Soros read Nadelmann's Spring 1988 piece in Foreign Policy, "U.S. Drug Policy: A Bad Export" as Soros had also published the piece "After Black Monday" in the same issue:

"Soros was so impressed with the drug policy piece that he contacted its author, Ethan Nadelmann. By 1993, with Soros's financial backing, Nadelmann established the Lindesmith Center, a policy institute named after Alfred E. Lindesmith, a sociologist who in the 1930s and 1940s had opposed harsh policies of drug prohibition in favor of medical treatment of addicts. Nadelmann, both brash and persuasive, identified the center's mission as seeking "harm reduction", which he defined as "an alternative approach to drug policy and treatment that focuses on minimizing the adverse effects of both drug use and drug prohibition."

Six years later the Center merged with the Drug Policy Foundation and the two became the Drug Policy Alliance, an advocacy group for drug policies "grounded in science, compassion, health and human rights." As the executive director, Nadelmann takes a public health - rather than a criminal justice - approach to the war on drugs, advocating for the application of harm reduction principles. He has been criticized for his libertarian position on drugs. Nadelmann stepped down as executive director in 2017.

=== Ballot Initiatives ===
Starting with Proposition 215 in California in 1996, Nadelmann raised the funds and oversaw the campaigns to legalize medical marijuana and lessen penalties for non-violent drug possession charges (e.g. Proposition 200 in Arizona in 1996) throughout the 1990s and 2000s. The three major funders were Peter Lewis, Soros, and John Sperling—The Washington Post calling them "a trio of enormously wealthy businessmen who are united behind one idea: that the war on drugs is a failure." In A New Leaf, Alyson Martin and Nushin Rashidan wrote, "[Nadelmann's] skills as a closer complemented his ability to connect very different and very influential individuals who cared about drug policy."

=== UNGASS 1998 ===
In 1998, the United Nations General Assembly held a special session on combatting drug use. The Lindesmith Center, led by Nadelmann, published a two-page public letter to Secretary-General of the United Nations Kofi Annan "asserting that the global war on drugs is causing more harm than drug abuse itself." The letter urged Annan "to initiate a truly open and honest dialogue regarding the future of global drug control policies—one in which fear, prejudice and punitive prohibitions yield to common sense, science, public health and human rights." The letter was signed by "hundreds of prominent people around the world" according to The New York Times, including Soros, Javier Perez de Cuellar, George P. Shultz, Oscar Arias, Walter Cronkite, Alan Cranston, Claiborne Pell, and Helen Suzman. Barry McCaffrey, the Clinton Administration's director of national drug policy, criticized the letter, saying it represented ''a 1950's perception'' of drug policy. He later referenced "a carefully camouflaged, exorbitantly funded, well-heeled elitist group whose ultimate goal is to legalize drug use in the United States," likely referring to the efforts of Nadelmann and Soros.

=== Influence on Public Figures ===
Nadelmann influenced public figures to rethink their views on drug policy. The New York Times cited "former Secretary of State George P. Shultz; the economist Milton Friedman, who has received the Nobel Prize; William F. Buckley, the conservative columnist, and Mayor Kurt Schmoke of Baltimore" as public figures that are making the argument for drug decriminalization or legalization and added, "Legalization has been promoted most vigorously by Ethan A. Nadelmann, who teaches at the Woodrow Wilson School of Public and International Affairs at Princeton University and who has been credited by public figures with opening their minds to the idea. In a 1989 speech to a group of alumni of the Stanford Business School, Shultz "recommended that the Stanford alumni study" Nadelmann's 1989 Science article, "Drug Prohibition in the United States: Costs, Consequences, and Alternatives," calling it "bold" and "informative". As more and more prominent figures voiced support for drug legalization starting in the late 1980s, Nadelmann became "the de facto spokesman for advocates of legalization."

=== Psychoactive--Podcast on Drugs Issues ===
In 2021, Nadelmann launched Psychoactive, a podcast on drug policy, drug use, and drugs research.

== Criticisms of drug policies ==
=== United States ===
Nadelmann has been a strong advocate of less restrictive cannabis laws in the United States including legalizing the use of cannabis for medical purposes, regulating recreational usage, and imposing civil rather than criminal penalties for those who are caught using or possessing small amounts of cannabis. In 2013, Nadelmann joined Richard Branson, founder of the Virgin Group; George Papandreou, former prime minister of Greece; David Marlon, Las Vegas-based addiction recovery advocate, to discuss the war on drugs within the U.S. borders, and cannabis' involvement in policy, incarceration, and addiction prevention.

== Lindesmith Center ==
The Lindesmith Center was an Open Society Institute project which has conducted research related to drug reform. It was founded in 1994 by Ethan Nadelmann with financial support from George Soros. The Center conducted some National Institute on Drug Abuse (NIDA) funded studies on harm reduction.

In 2000, the Center and the Drug Policy Foundation were merged into the Drug Policy Alliance, with the Center being renamed The Lindesmith Library. The Drug Policy Foundation was a non-profit organization whose focus was public policy, advocating for harm reduction, sentencing reform for non-violent drug offenses, and the legal access to medical marijuana. Through the Drug Policy Alliance, the Lindesmith Library continues to distribute materials to community organizations seeking science-based information about drug use and misuse.

The center was named after Alfred R. Lindesmith (1905–1991), a professor of sociology at Indiana University, who was a prolific writer on drug use and policy.

== Bibliography ==
=== Books ===
- Nadelmann, Ethan (1993). Cops Across Borders: The Internationalization of U.S. Criminal Law Enforcement. Pennsylvania State University Press. ISBN 978-0-271-01095-3.
- Nadelmann, Ethan; Andreas, Peter (2006). Policing the Globe: Criminalization and Crime Control in International Relations. Oxford University Press. ISBN 978-0-19-508948-6.

=== Selected Academic Works ===
- Nadelmann, Ethan A. (1988). "U. S. Drug Policy: A Bad Export". Foreign Policy (70): 83–108. doi:10.2307/1148617. JSTOR 1148617.
- Nadelmann, Ethan A. (Summer 1988). "The Case for Legalization". The Public Interest. pp. 3–38.
- Nadelmann, Ethan A. (1989). "Drug Prohibition in the United States: Costs, Consequences, and Alternatives". Science. 245 (4921): 939–947. Bibcode:1989Sci...245..939N. doi:10.1126/science.2772647. JSTOR 1704189. PMID 2772647.
- Nadelmann, Ethan A. (1992). "Thinking Seriously about Alternatives to Drug Prohibition". Daedalus. 121 (3): 85–132. JSTOR 20027122.
- Nadelmann, Ethan A. (December 1, 1997). "Commonsense Drug Policy". Foreign Affairs.
- Nadelmann, Ethan A. (July 12, 2004). "An End to Marijuana Prohibition". National Review.
- Nadelmann, Ethan (2007). "Drugs". Foreign Policy (162): 24–30. JSTOR 25462207.
