= Zach Deputy =

- Born: Zachry Deputy
- Origin: Bluffton, South Carolina, United States
- Genres: Funk, calypso, soul, hip hop, jazz, jam, acoustic rock
- Occupation: Musician
- Instruments: Guitar, vocals, drums
- Labels: United For Opportunity, Eusonia Records
- Website: zachdeputy.com

Zach Deputy is a multi-instrumentalist and songwriter based in Savannah, Georgia and best known for his live looping shows. He describes his style as "island-infused drum n' bass gospel ninja soul."

== Biography ==
Deputy has a diverse ethnic background, having Puerto Rican, Jewish, Irish, African, British, French, and Cherokee heritage, which opens him to influence from Latin, Caribbean, and African music. Deputy's music is often about "the highs of life," and he has said that songwriting is a way to "take pictures of the things that I want to remind myself of 10 years from now."

Deputy began looping when his bass player couldn't make it to a show and Zach decided to use a delay pedal as a looping pedal rather than cancel the gig. When he plays live, he will loop and layer chord progressions, bass, beat boxing, drum sounds, vocals, and guitar. He performs with four microphones: a vocal synthesizer for choir sounds; one for high-hat, snare, and back-beat; one for main vocals, and one for vocal bass or bass drum. His looping shows are known for their variety. "There are so many different ways it can happen. I can loop my guitar first, go into drums or loop a vocal riff first or straight into beat boxing and loop it or just go acoustic. It's very free formed. Every show can be extremely different from another. I try to have little consistency when it comes to my show. I never want to get bored with myself."

Deputy spends most of the year touring and at one time averaged 300 shows a year. His performances are mostly one-man-band looping shows, but also include Zach Deputy Band shows and acoustic storyteller shows. He has played many large festivals such as Jam Cruise, Mountain Jam, High Sierra Music Festival, Gathering of the Vibes and All Good Music Festival.

Deputy's third album, Another Day (2011), departed from eclectic sound of his first two records into a soulful rhythm and blues, showcasing his talents as a songwriter. The album was recorded over 5 days at Mission Sound Recording in Brooklyn, New York, with Grammy-winning producer Scott Jacoby and released on Eusonia Records. Of the album, Deputy said, "I wanted to put down some of the songs that I just played when I was hanging out by myself, when I wasn't actually trying to entertain anybody. Some people say they don't understand and it's a whole new direction, but for me it's a not a whole new direction, it's just something I do."

Zach Deputy is an avid disc golf player. He is a Celebrity Ambassador for Innova Discs and his passion for the sport has been featured on CNN. In March 2013, he hosted the first annual Zach Deputy's Disc Jam, a music and disc golf festival in Live Oak, Florida.

On January 6 2021 Deputy's brother posted a video on Facebook documenting the pair's participation in the January 6 United States Capitol attack. Deputy later posted a follow-up video where he attributed his participation to his belief of large-scale voter fraud having swayed the 2020 United States presidential election in favor of Joe Biden. “It is my opinion that there was a lot–and I mean a lot–of evidence that would suggest that our vote was tampered with,” the singer-songwriter said.

== Discography ==
- Out of the Water (2008)
- Sunshine (2009)
- Into The Morning (EP) (2011)
- Another Day (2011)
- Wash It in the Water (2016)
- Cruzan Soul (2025)
