= English Heart =

Studio album by Ronnie Spector
- Released: April 8, 2016
- Genre: Pop rock
- Length: 31:55
- Label: 429
- Producer: Scott Jacoby

Ronnie Spector chronology
Last of the Rock Stars (2006)	English Heart (2016)

English Heart is the fourth and final studio album by American recording artist Ronnie Spector, released on April 8, 2016, by 429 Records. It's a cover album of rock and pop songs by British artists of the British Invasion era, except for two tracks.

Professional ratings
Aggregate scores
Source	Rating
Metacritic	64/100
Review scores
Source	Rating
AllMusic	3/5 stars
Digital Journal	A
PopMatters	6/10
Louder Sound	4/5 stars
Record Collector	3/5 stars

== Critical reception ==
Markos Papadatos of Digital Journal praised the album, stating "Overall, Ronnie Spector is as good as ever on her latest studio effort. There are no filler tracks on this musical project, and it proves that the 'Original Bad Girl of Rock and Roll' is back with a vengeance. English Heart garners an A rating."

== Track listing ==
No.	Title	Writer(s)	Length
1.	"Oh Me Oh My (I'm a Fool for You Baby)"	Jim Doris	3:35
2.	"Because"	Dave Clark	2:29
3.	"I'd Much Rather Be With the Girls"	Keith Richards, Andrew Loog Oldham	2:49
4.	"Don't Let the Sun Catch You Crying"	Les Chadwick, Les Maguire, Fred Marsden, Gerry Marsden	3:03
5.	"Tired of Waiting"	Ray Davies	3:25
6.	"Tell Her No"	Rod Argent	2:15
7.	"I'll Follow the Sun"	John Lennon, Paul McCartney	2:14
8.	"You've Got Your Troubles"	Roger Cook, Roger Greenaway	3:22
9.	"Girl Don't Come"	Chris Andrews	2:10
10.	"Don't Let Me Be Misunderstood"	Bennie Benjamin, Gloria Caldwell, Sol Marcus	2:37
11.	"How Can You Mend a Broken Heart"	Barry Gibb, Robin Gibb	3:56

== Chart history ==
=== Weekly charts ===
Chart (2016)	Peak position
Heatseekers Albums	6
