= Bree Newsome =

American activist

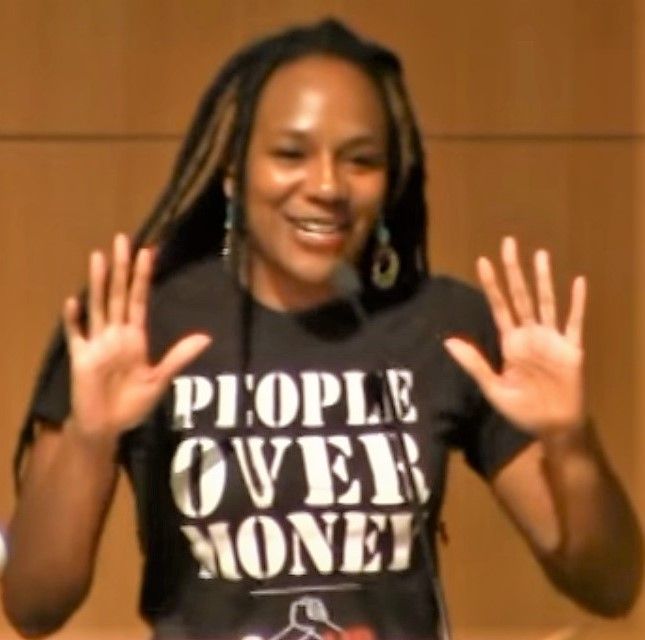
- Newsome at CUNY Graduate Center, 2015
- Born: May 13, 1985 (age 41); Durham, North Carolina, U.S.
- Education: New York University (BFA)
- Website: Official website

Brittany Ann Byuarm Newsome Bass (born May 13, 1985) is an American filmmaker, activist and speaker from Charlotte, North Carolina. She is best known for her act of civil disobedience on June 27, 2015, when she was arrested for removing the Confederate flag from the South Carolina state house grounds in the aftermath of the Charleston church shooting. The resulting publicity put pressure on state officials to remove the flag, and it was taken down permanently on July 10, 2015.

== Early life and education ==
Newsome attended Oakland Mills High School in Columbia, Maryland. In 2003, she was named one of the "20 Coolest Girls in America" by YM magazine. While still in high school, Newsome created a short animated film for which she won a college scholarship. She studied film at New York University's Tisch School of the Arts.

== Career ==
=== Film ===
Her film Wake has won numerous awards, including the Outstanding Independent Short Film award in the Black Reel Awards of 2012 and the Best Short Film at the BET Urban World Film Festival. It has been screened at many film festivals including the 63rd annual Cannes Film Festival in France, the New York International Latino Film Festival, and the Montreal International Black Film Festival. Newsome was the first African-American undergraduate to be nominated for the prestigious Wasserman Award (Spike Lee having won the award as a graduate student).

Newsome said that her experience as a black woman working in the horror and sci-fi film genres inspired her to become an activist. Speaking as part of a panel at Spelman College in 2014, she said: "The space that exists for many of us, as a young black girl, is so extremely limited so that you really can't go very far without being an activist, without being in defiance of something."

=== Activism ===
==== 2013 ====
Newsome was arrested in July 2013 at a sit-in at the office of then North Carolina House Speaker Thom Tillis while protesting North Carolina's voter ID law.

==== 2015 ====
On June 27, 2015, she was arrested for taking down the Confederate battle flag that was displayed on the grounds of the South Carolina State House in direct action. Newsome, aged 30, while scaling the 30-foot (9.1 m) pole, was hailed by policemen who told her to get down. She responded: "In the name of Jesus, this flag has to come down. You come against me with hatred and oppression and violence. I come against you in the name of God. This flag comes down today." As she lowered the flag and descended into the arms of awaiting policemen, she announced she was prepared to be arrested. Both Newsome and a man who police said was helping her, James Ian Tyson, were arrested. Onlookers applauded Newsome's efforts as she was handcuffed. As she was led away, she recited the 23rd Psalm from the Bible. The flag was raised again 45 minutes later.

Both activists were charged with defacing monuments on capitol grounds, a misdemeanor punishable by a fine or a maximum jail sentence of three years, and taken to Richland County Jail. A judge set a $3,000 bond for each.

Newsome's act of civil disobedience made international headlines and television news. By late afternoon, a crowdfunding campaign had raised over $60,000 for her bail. Filmmaker Michael Moore offered on Twitter to pay her bail and legal fees. Todd Rutherford, the minority leader of the state House of Representatives, offered to represent Newsome in court. NAACP chapter president Reverend William Barber II applauded Newsome's action, comparing it to those of Rosa Parks and other icons of the Civil Rights Movement. Colette Gaiter, an associate professor of art and social change at the University of Delaware, whose writing was republished by Time magazine, called the act "a significant piece of socially engaged performance art". After her release, Newsome gave numerous magazine interviews and appeared on talk shows such as Democracy Now! and The Nightly Show with Larry Wilmore. She also appears in the award-winning 2015 documentary, Bars4justice.

Newsome's actions were criticized by several South Carolina legislators who said that they were in favor of the flag's removal, but illegal actions like Newsome's could hurt their goal to have the flag permanently removed. Calls for the flag's removal had been on the increase since the murder of nine people in the Charleston church shooting of June 17.

Several days after her arrest, Newsome released a statement to Blue Nation Review revealing what propelled her to act.

I realized that now is the time for true courage the morning after the Charleston Massacre shook me to the core of my being. I couldn't sleep. I sat awake in the dead of night. All the ghosts of the past seemed to be rising.

Not long ago, I had watched the beginning of Selma, the reenactment of the 16th Street Baptist Church bombing and had shuddered at the horrors of history.

But this was neither a scene from a movie nor was it the past. A white man had just entered a black church and massacred people as they prayed. He had assassinated a civil rights leader. This was not a page in a textbook I was reading nor an inscription on a monument I was visiting.

A vote on the presence of the flag took place among South Carolina's House of Representatives on July 9, which resulted in the final removal of the flag the following Friday. The charges against Newsome and Tyson were later dropped.

==== 2016 ====
As a presidential candidate speaking at a Martin Luther King Day 2016 celebration in Charleston, Hillary Clinton credited Newsome for taking the matter into her own hands by "shimmying up that flagpole" as a step in the process. "Every year, you've gathered right here and said that that symbol of division and racism went against everything Dr. King stood for. We couldn't celebrate him and the Confederacy, we had to choose. And South Carolina finally made the right choice."

In February 2016, Newsome told Ebony magazine that she had been motivated in part by her ancestors having been enslaved and subjected to racial terrorism in South Carolina.

==== 2017 ====
Newsome has continued to speak on race-related issues such as affirmative action. She has given interviews to newspapers and magazines such as The Crisis, Vox, and Marie Claire, made television appearances, and given public speeches at colleges and other venues. Following the deadly attack during the Unite the Right rally in Charlottesville, Virginia, on August 17, 2017, Newsome's op-ed piece and video commentary appeared in The Washington Post.

Beginning in 2017, Newsome has worked as an activist for housing rights.

==== 2021 ====
In an October 13, 2021 podcast discussing Colin Kaepernick's book, Abolition for the People: The Movement for a Future Without Policing and Prisons, Newsome argued all law enforcement, criminal justice and prisons should be completely abolished.

==== 2023 ====
Newsome expressed solidarity with Palestine during the Israeli invasion of the Gaza Strip and described Joe Biden as a dictator. Newsome defended Saira Rao's argument that Zionist doctors and nurses pose a threat to Black and Muslim patients.

== Honors and awards ==
- Outstanding Independent Short Film award, Black Reel Awards of 2012
- Best Short Film at the BET Urban World Film Festival
- NAACP Image Award – Chairman's Award, presented by NAACP chairwoman Roslyn Brock on February 5, 2016
