= Apartment 4E =

- Directed by: Russell Leigh Sharman
- Written by: Russell Leigh Sharman
- Starring: Nicole Beharie; Christopher Domig
- Release date: 2012
- Country: United States
- Language: English

Apartment 4E is a 2012 American mystery drama film written and directed by Russell Leigh Sharman and starring Nicole Beharie and Christopher Domig.

== Cast ==
- Nicole Beharie as Piper
- Christopher Domig

== Release ==
The film premiered at the Urbanworld Film Festival and the Pan African Film Festival in 2012. It was later released on DVD on May 21, 2013.
