= List of urban contemporary artists =

This is a list of artists associated with urban contemporary music. The list includes solo performers and groups across several decades of the genre's development.

== Artists ==
- Aaliyah
- Angela Bofill
- Amerie
- Ashanti
- Brandy
- CeCe Peniston
- Cherrelle
- Chris Brown
- Ciara
- Colonel Abrams
- Crystal Waters
- Dru Hill
- Fergie
- Frankie J
- Ginuwine
- H-Town
- Jaguar Wright
- Jennifer Lopez
- Joi Cardwell
- Justin Timberlake
- Kai
- Karyn White
- Kelis
- Kelly Rowland
- LeToya Luckett
- La Toya Jackson
- LaToya London
- Meli'sa Morgan
- Miki Howard
- Millie Jackson
- Millie Scott
- Missy Elliott
- Morris Day
- Nelly Furtado
- Nathy Peluso
- Omarion
- Perri "Pebbles" Reid
- Peggy Scott-Adams
- Porta
- Regina Belle
- Rihanna
- Samantha Fox
- Shanice
- Sharon Redd
- Sisqó
- Soulhead
- Taylor Dayne
- Teena Marie
