= Ready II Fly =

Studio album by Naturally 7
- Released: September 30, 2006
- Recorded: 2006
- Genre: R&B; soul; pop; A cappella
- Length: 1:08:49
- Label: Virgin Germany

Naturally 7 chronology
Christmas... It's a Love Story (2004)	Ready II Fly (2006)	Wall of Sound (2009)

Ready II Fly is the fourth studio album by American a capella group Naturally 7, which was released on September 30, 2006, through Virgin Germany Records. The album peaked at number 67 in France. Ready II Fly debuted at number 14 on the Australian ARIA Charts as of June 13, 2008. This follows a successful tour of Australia as the supporting act of Michael Bublé.

== Track listing ==
#	Title	Time
1	Can Ya Feel It?	3:52
2	Open Your Eyes	3:42
3	Feel It (In the Air Tonight)	4:42
4	Harder Than That	4:02
5	How Could It Be?	1:48
6	Forever for You	4:13
7	Cool	4:01
8	Never	3:03
9	I Can't Doo Dat	3:49
10	4 Life	3:56
11	Tradition	3:45
12	Fly Baby	1:07
13	Let It Rain	4:02
14	What I'm Lookin' 4 (Ain't No Mountain High Enough)	4:26
15	New York	4:32
16	Comfort You	3:53
17	Close 2 Me	4:45
18	True Friends (And Family)	5:08
