= Non-Fiction (Naturally 7 album) =

2000 studio album by Naturally 7

Studio album by Naturally 7
- Released: November 1, 2000
- Recorded: 2000
- Genre: R&B; soul; pop; A cappella
- Length: 49:54
- Label: Festplatte AG

Naturally 7 chronology
Non-Fiction (2000)	What Is It (2003)

Non-Fiction is the debut studio album by American a cappella group Naturally 7, released on November 1, 2000, by Festplatte AG.

== Track listing ==
1. Opening Meditation (The Path I Take)
2. Theme From Mahogany
3. Sit - Back - Relax
4. WDRG - AM
5. Bridge Over Troubled Water
6. All Of You
7. At The Tone
8. Born To Worship
9. Last Days (Reprise)
10. Blessed Assurance
11. Y'All Hear Dat
12. Train
13. Last Days
14. Bless This House
15. Closing Meditation (The Path I Take)
16. Have I Ever Told You
