= Naturally 7 =

American music group

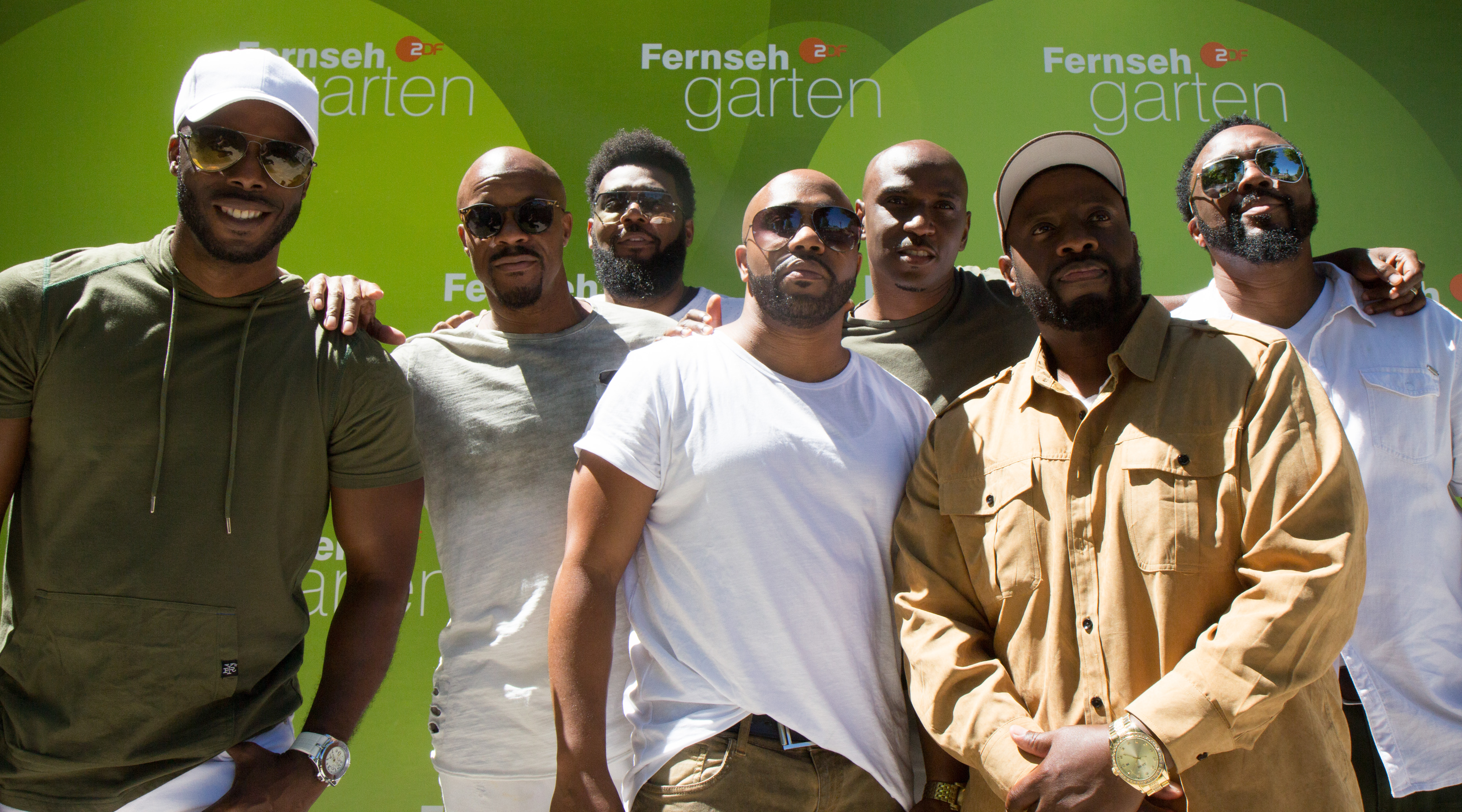
- Naturally 7

Background information
- Origin: New York City, United States
- Genres: R&B; soul; pop; A cappella
- Years active: 1999–present
- Labels: EMI Germany; Hidden Beach
- Members: Roger Thomas; Warren Thomas; Rod Eldridge; Dwight Stewart; Ricky Cort; Sean Simmonds; N'Namdi Bryant
- Past members: Jamal Reed; Marcus Davis; Andre Edwards; Armand "Hops" Hutton; Napolien "Polo" Cummings; Garfield Buckley; Kelvin "Kelz" Mitchell
- Website: naturallyseven.com

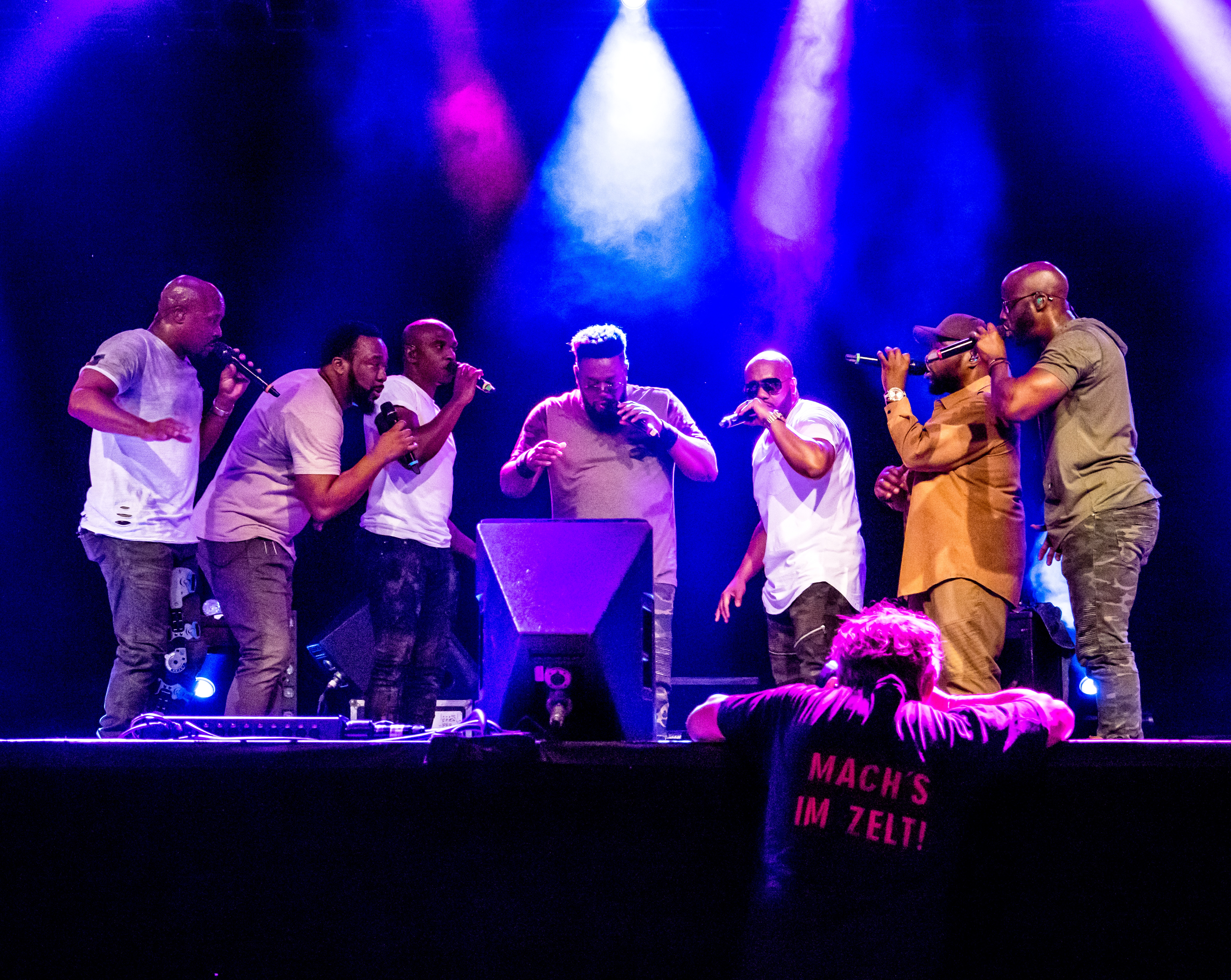
Naturally 7 at the Zelt-Musik-Festival 2018 in Freiburg, Germany

Naturally 7 is an American music group with a distinct a cappella style they call "vocal play," which, according to group leader Roger Thomas, is "the art of becoming an instrument using the human voice to create the sound." They simulate the sounds of an instrumental band using only their voices, mouths and distortion effects. The group was formed in 1999 in New York City. It currently consists of the Thomas brothers Roger (musical director, arranger, first baritone, rapping) and Warren (drums, third tenor), Rod Eldridge (first tenor, scratching, guitar, trumpet), Ricky Cort (first tenor, guitar), Dwight Stewart (second baritone, vocals, trombone), Sean Simmonds (second tenor, harmonica), and N'Namdi Bryant (bass guitar, trumpet).

== History ==
=== Early years ===
Naturally 7 was founded in 1999 by brothers Roger and Warren Thomas, from Rosedale, Queens. The brothers recruited five other singers they had come to know over the years of singing around the city. Roger was part of several traditional male groups over the years, thus developing his singing quality. When the group was invited to sing at a major a cappella competition in New York City, they won and moved onto the nationals before they took two more wins in the competition. Riding their new-found success and still having made no decision whether to have Naturally 7 as an a cappella group or a traditional band, Roger had the novel idea that the group would become both.

=== Ready II Fly ===
Naturally 7 has released a number of albums over the years since the formation at New York City in 1999, including their debut studio album entitled Non-Fiction released in 2000, What Is It released in 2003, Christmas... It's a Love Story released in 2004, and Ready II Fly in 2006, released through Virginia Records. The group gained success by the partial cover of Phil Collins's "In the Air Tonight", titled as "Feel It (In the Air Tonight)", which contains additional lyrics from the group. The performance of the song at a subway has received over four and a half million hits on YouTube alone, and a number of people discovering the group, which adds to a figure daily. The single itself has turned into a Top 3-chart- success in countries outside North America, such as France, Belgium and South Africa, and also made the single charts in other European countries.

=== Wall of Sound ===
In January 2009, the group released Wall of Sound as an exclusive special album in the United Kingdom and Ireland to commemorate their participation at the Royal Variety Performance. It contains known material from their previous albums, as well as five brand new tracks, which entered the British Album-Charts in the first week after release at #29. The group appeared on The Late Late Show with Craig Ferguson, performing "Stardust" with Michael Bublé. In November 2009, the group travelled to Bermuda, as they took part in Quincy Jones's 2009 Bermuda Music Festival performing before an enthusiastic crowd.

=== Vocal Play ===
The CD/DVD version of Vocal Play, which was released in 2010, contains original self-made tracks, such as "SOS (Anybody Out There)", the power ballad of "Love Me", the Motown-influenced “Ready or Not”, the Latin 768 and a duet with Michael Bublé on the Dinah Washington classic, “Relax Max”. The DVD includes HD live material from their performance at Madison Square Garden, extensive interviews with each group member, as well as their video clips. In fall 2010, the group, along with American rapper Ludacris, were featured on a track that appeared in Quincy Jones's album, Soul Bossa Nostra, which led them to a performance at The View in November, before continuing on touring with Bublé. Naturally 7 contributed a few songs for the soundtrack of the 2010 German/English dub film Animals United, including "King of the Road", "Splish Splash", "Hokey Pokey", and "Move On Up".

== Members ==
=== Current ===
Name	Voice part	Primary vocal play role	Secondary vocal play roles	Years present
Roger Anthony Thomas	1st baritone, 4th tenor, leader	rap	keyboard, synth, trumpet, strings, wah wah guitar	1999 ~ present
Warren Andre Thomas	3rd tenor	drums, percussion	trumpet, string, electric guitar	1999 ~ present
Roderick Lowell Eldridge	2nd tenor	DJ scratching, loop pedal	percussion, electric and rhythm guitar, trumpet, string, flute, keyboard, rap	1999 ~ present
Dwight Martindale Stewart	2nd baritone, lead vocal	trombone	rhythm guitar	1999 ~ present
Lee Ricardo "Ricky" Cort	1st tenor, lead vocal	electric guitar	trumpet, strings, synth, rap	Apr 2015 ~ present
Sean Anthony Simmonds	3rd tenor, lead vocal	harmonica	trumpet, rap	May 2018 ~ present
N'Namdi Olufemi Bryant	bass	bass guitar	contrabass, bass synth	Aug 27th 2021 ~ present

=== Former ===
Name	Voice part	Primary vocal play role	Secondary vocal play roles	Years present
Armand "Hops" Hutton	bass	bass guitar	contrabass, bass synth	Oct 2006 ~ Dec 2014, Dec 2020 ~ Aug 15th, Nov 6th 2021
Kelvin “Kelz” Mitchell	bass	bass guitar	contrabass, trumpet, bass synth	Jan 2015 ~ Dec 2020
Garfield Rolando Buckley	2nd tenor	harmonica	trumpet, strings, rhythm guitar	1999 ~ May 2018
Napoleon “Polo” Cummings	1st tenor	electric guitar	trumpet, strings, synth	Oct 2010 ~ Apr 2015
Jamal Mackram Reed	1st tenor	electric guitar, flute, violin	trumpet, synth, strings	2000 ~ Oct 2010
Andre Edwards	bass	bass guitar		2006 ~ Oct 2006
Marcus H. Davis	bass	bass guitar		1999 ~ 2006
David LaRoche	1st tenor			1999 ~ 2000

== Discography ==
=== Studio albums ===
Year	Title	Peak chart positions			
Year	Title	AUS	FRA	GER	UK
2000	Non-Fiction	—	—	—	—
2003	What Is It?	52	—	40	—
2004	Christmas: It's a Love Story	—	—	—	—
2006	Ready II Fly	14	64	—	—
2009	Wall of Sound	—	—	—	29
2010	Vocal Play	—	—	—	—
2012	Live	—	—	—	—
2015	Hidden in Plain Sight	—	—	—	—
2017	Both Sides Now	—	—	—	—
2018	A Christmas Xperience	—	—	—	—
2020	XX 20/20	—	—	—	—
2024	Naturally 7 @theMovies, Volume One	—	—	—	—

=== Singles ===
Year	Title	Peak chart positions						
Year	Title	AUT	BEL (Vl)	BEL (Wa)	FRA	GER	ITA	SWI
2003	"Music Is the Key" (with Sarah Connor)	6	3	11	–	1	–	2
2006	"Feel It (In the Air Tonight)"	–	–	3	15	55	14	–

== Featured songs ==
- Xavier Naidoo: "Wild vor Wut" (featuring Naturally 7)
- Quincy Jones: "Soul Bossa Nostra" (featuring Ludacris, Naturally 7, & Rudy Currence) album Q: Soul Bossa Nostra
- Xavier Naidoo: "A New Horizon" (featuring Naturally 7) from the German/English dub film Animals United (2010). A "Vocal Play" version is included on the soundtrack, which was released on December 7, 2010 through Königskinder Music, and is also available on iTunes.

== Other songs ==
The following songs are included on the soundtrack for the 2010 German/English dub film, Animals United:

- "King of the Road"
- "Splish Splash"
- "Move On Up"
- "Hokey Pokey"

== MLK Day performance ==
In January 2016, in honor of Martin Luther King Jr. Day, the group performed with The Maccabeats, a Jewish a cappella group from Yeshiva University, in a cover of James Taylor's "Shed a Little Light." The music video was filmed in front of the Lincoln Memorial in Washington, D.C., where King delivered his "I Have a Dream" speech. Taylor called the performance "one of the best covers of 'Shed a Little Light' I've ever heard."
