= Grammy Award for Best Urban/Alternative Performance =

Music award category

- Awarded for: quality urban/alternative performances
- Country: United States
- Presented by: National Academy of Recording Arts and Sciences
- First award: 2003
- Final award: 2011
- Website: grammy.com

The Grammy Award for Best Urban/Alternative Performance was an honor presented at the Grammy Awards, a ceremony that was established in 1958 and originally called the Gramophone Awards, to recording artists for quality urban/alternative performances. Awards in several categories are distributed annually by the National Academy of Recording Arts and Sciences of the United States to "honor artistic achievement, technical proficiency and overall excellence in the recording industry, without regard to album sales or chart position."

The award was first awarded to India.Arie at the 45th Grammy Awards (2003) for her song "Little Things". According to the category description guide for the 52nd Grammy Awards, the award was presented to artists that had made "newly recorded urban/alternative performances with vocals". The award was intended to recognize artists "who have been influenced by a cross-section of urban music" and who create music that is out of the "mainstream trends".

Two-time recipients include India.Arie, Cee Lo Green (once as part of the duo Gnarls Barkley), and Jill Scott. Erykah Badu, Big Boi (a member of OutKast) and will.i.am (a member of The Black Eyed Peas) share the record for the most nominations, with three each. Sérgio Mendes is the only performer to be nominated twice in one year. The category was dominated by Americans, yet individuals from Jamaica and Côte d'Ivoire also won the award. The award was discontinued from 2012 in a major overhaul of the Grammys where the category was shifted to the Best R&B Performance category.

== Recipients ==
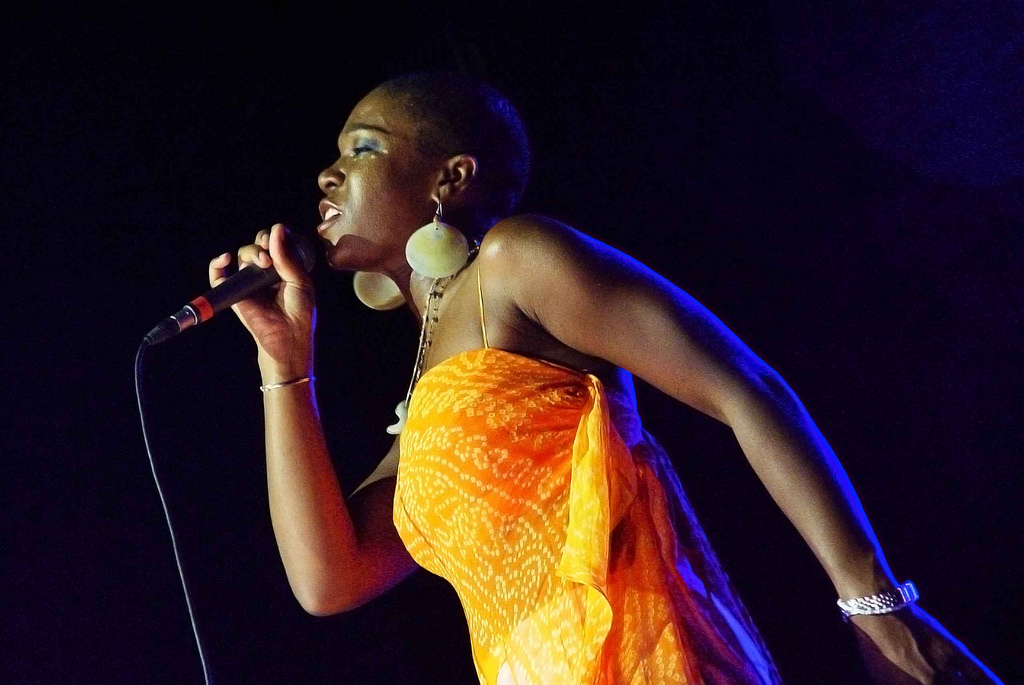
India.Arie became the first recipient of the award in 2003.

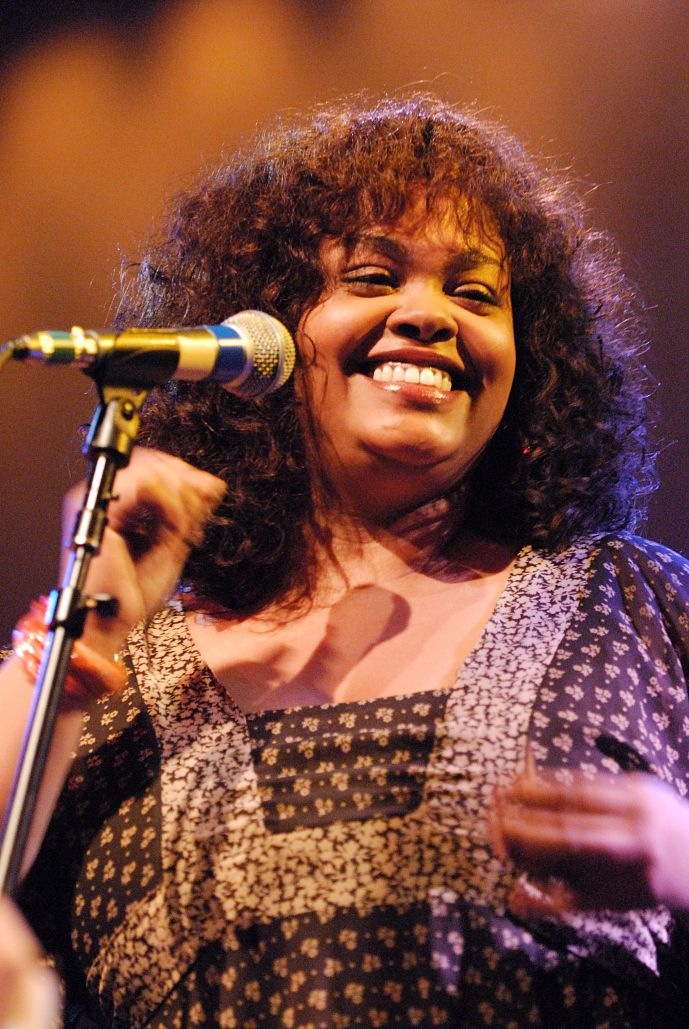
2005 and 2008 award winner Jill Scott performing in 2007

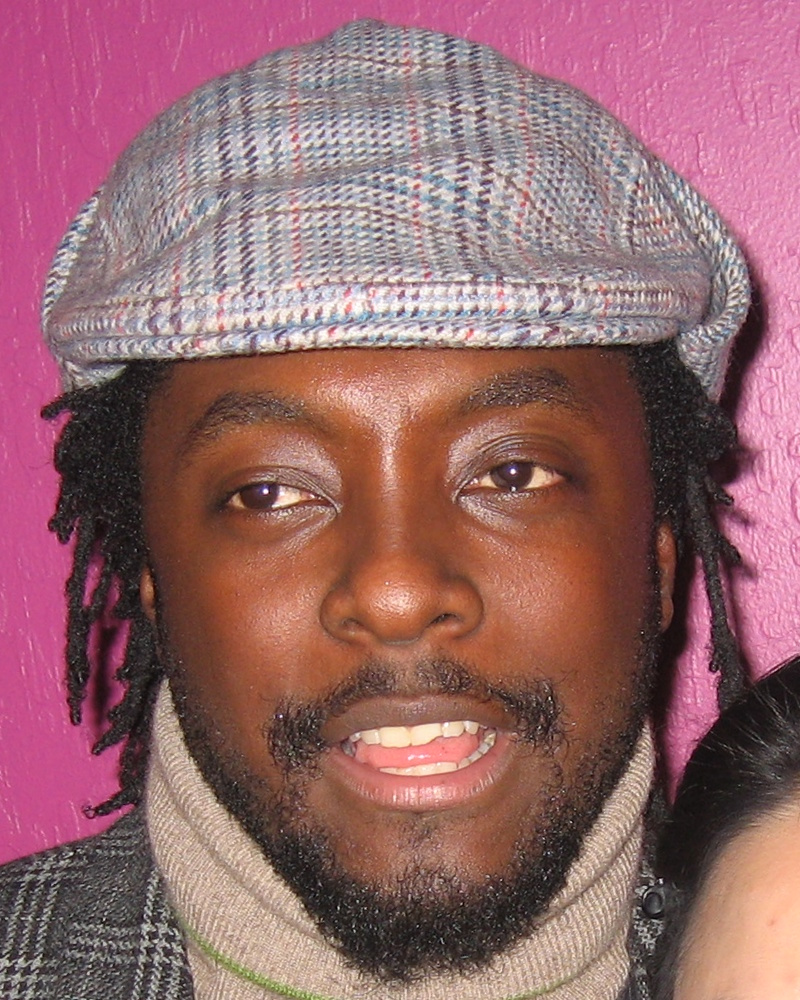
2009 award recipient will.i.am

Year^{[I]}	Performing artist(s)	Work	Nominees	Ref.
2003	India.Arie	"Little Things"	Erykah Badu and Common – "Love of My Life (Ode to Hip-Hop)"; Floetry – "Floetic"; CeeLo Green – "Getting Grown"; Raphael Saadiq and D'Angelo – "Be Here"	
2004	OutKast	"Hey Ya!"	Erykah Badu – "Danger"; Kelis – "Milkshake"; Les Nubians – "J'veux D'la Musique"; Musiq – "Forthenight"	
2005	Jill Scott	"Cross My Mind"	Mos Def – "Sex, Love & Money"; Musiq – "Are You Experienced?"; N.E.R.D – "She Wants to Move"; The Roots – "Star"	
2006	Damian Marley	"Welcome to Jamrock"	Floetry – "SupaStar"; Gorillaz – "Dirty Harry"; Mos Def – "Ghetto Rock"; Van Hunt – "Dust"	
2007	Gnarls Barkley	"Crazy"	Sérgio Mendes, Erykah Badu and will.i.am – "That Heat"; Sérgio Mendes and The Black Eyed Peas – "Mas Que Nada"; OutKast – "Idlewild Blue (Don'tchu Worry 'Bout Me)"; Prince – "3121"	
2008	Lupe Fiasco and Jill Scott	"Daydreamin'"	Dwele – "That's the Way of the World"; Vikter Duplaix – "Make a Baby"; Alice Smith – "Dream"; Meshell Ndegeocello – "Fantasy"	
2009	Chrisette Michele and will.i.am	"Be OK"	Kenna – "Say Goodbye to Love"; Maiysha – "Wanna Be"; Janelle Monáe – "Many Moons"; Wayna and Kokayi – "Lovin' You (Music)"	
2010	India.Arie and Dobet Gnahoré	"Pearls"	The Foreign Exchange and Muhsinah – "Daykeeper"; Robert Glasper and Bilal – "All Matter"; Eric Roberson, Ben O'Neill and Michelle Thompson – "A Tale of Two"; Tonéx – "Blend"	
2011	CeeLo Green	"Fuck You"	Bilal – "Little One"; Carolyn Malachi – "Orion"; Janelle Monáe and Big Boi – "Tightrope"; Eric Roberson – "Still"	

^{^[I]} Each year is linked to the article about the Grammy Awards held that year.

== See also ==
- List of Grammy Award categories
- List of Urban contemporary artists
