= Les Soul Men =

Studio album by Vigon Bamy Jay
- Released: 25 March 2013; 25 November 2013 (special edition)
- Recorded: 2012–2013
- Genres: Rock, R&B, soul
- Label: 323 Records

Vigon Bamy Jay chronology
Les Soul Men (2013)	Love Me Tender (2015)

Alternative cover
- Special edition cover

Les Soul Men is a 2013 cover album by French international R&B trio Vigon Bamy Jay composed of English and French classics and at times a bilingual combined English/French interpretations.

The album released on 25 March 2013 reached number 7 on the French SNEP Albums Chart.

The album was rereleased on 25 November 2013 with additional tracks including many participating vocals and a number of music video bonuses, interviews, "making of' and live concert recordings.

== Track list ==
1. "Feelings" (3:21)
2. "Soul Man" (2:54)
3. "(Sittin' On) The Dock of the Bay" (2:59)
4. "I'll Be There (Reach Out I'll Be There)" (3:26)
5. "Can't Take My Eyes Off You" (4:35)
6. "Ain't No Sunshine" (2:29)
7. "Long Train Runnin'" (3:40)
8. "Unchained Melody" (3:43)
9. "What I'd Say" (4:12)
10. "Les Moulins de Mon Cœur" (3:38)
11. "Quand Les Hommes Vivront d'Amour" (3:32)
12. "Avec le Temps" (4:07)

== Track list – special edition ==
1. "Feelings" – Vigon Bamy Jay, Loulou Gasté & Morris Albert (3:21)
2. "Soul Man" – Vigon Bamy Jay & Isaac Lee Hayes (2:54)
3. "Sittin' On the Dock of the Bay" – Vigon Bamy Jay & Steve Crooper (2:59)
4. "I'll Be There (Reach Out I'll Be There)" – Vigon Bamy Jay, Brian Holland, Edward Holland Jr., Lamont Herbert Dozier, Harold Beatty, Marcia Woods, Chauncey Hawkins, Anthony Best & Carl Thomas (3:27)
5. "Can't Take My Eyes Off You" – Vigon Bamy Jay, Robert Gaudio & Bob Crewe (4:35)
6. "Ain't No Sunshine" – Vigon Bamy Jay & Bill Withers (2:30)
7. "The Sun Died" – Vigon Bamy Jay & Hubert Giraud (3:31)
8. "Move On Up" – Vigon Bamy Jay & Curtis Mayfield (2:55)
9. "Let's Stay Together" – Al Green, Willie Mitchell, Vigon Bamy Jay & Al Jackson, Jr. (3:54)
10. "Long Train Runnin'" – Vigon Bamy Jay & Alan Thomas Johnson (3:40)
11. "Unchained Melody" – Vigon Bamy Jay & Alex North (3:43)
12. "What I'd Say" – Vigon Bamy Jay & Ray Charles (4:13)
13. "When a Man Loves a Woman" – Vigon Bamy Jay, Andrew Wright & Calvin Houston Lewis (3:34)
14. "Avec Le Temps" – Vigon Bamy Jay & Léo Ferré (4:06)
15. "Les moulins de mon coeur – Vigon Bamy Jay & Michel Legrand (3:37)
16. "Quand les hommes vivront d'amour" – Vigon Bamy Jay & Raymond Lévesque (3:32)
17. "The Sun Died (Il est mort le soleil)" – Vigon Bamy Jay & Hubert Giraud (3:02)
18. "Feelings (Dis lui)" – Vigon Bamy Jay, Loulou Gasté & Morris Albert (3:23)

Bonuses

1. "Feelings (Dis lui)" (video) – Loulou Gasté, Vigon Bamy Jay & Morris Albert (3:20)
2. "I'll Be There (J'attendrai)" (video) – Vigon Bamy Jay, Brian Holland, Edward Holland Jr. & Lamont Herbert Dozier (3:29)
3. "The Sun Died (Il est mort le soleil)" (video) – Vigon Bamy Jay & Hubert Giraud (3:03)
4. Making of "The Sun Died (Il est mort le soleil)" (video)– Vigon Bamy Jay & Hubert Giraud
5. Interview – Willie Mitchell, Vigon Bamy Jay, Al Green, Al Jackson, Jr., Andrew Wright, Non Relevant & Calvin Houston Lewis (7:43)
6. Concert (Video)– 4 songs – Vigon Bamy Jay, Andrew Wright, Loulou Gasté, Calvin Houston Lewis, Steve Crooper, Hubert Giraud & Morris Albert (17:24)

== Charts ==
Chart (2013–14)	Peak position
French Albums (SNEP)	7
