= Vigon Bamy Jay =

International R&B musical trio

- Origin: France
- Genres: R&B
- Years active: 2013–present
- Members: Vigon; Érick Bamy; Jay
- Website: vigonbamyjay.fr

Vigon Bamy Jay was a French international R&B musical trio established by M6 in 2013 made up of three very well-established long-standing singers Vigon, Érick Bamy and Jay. The trio's album Les Soul Men released on 25 March 2013 was hugely popular peaking at number 7 on the SNEP Official French Albums Top 200 chart and certified gold. The album contains interpretations of classics from Ray Charles, the Four Tops, Bill Withers, Righteous Brothers etc. The trio engaged in a long series of tours to promote the album.

A re-edited version of the album was released on 25 November 2013 with 7 additional classic tracks. Until end of May 2014, the album has spent 56 weeks in the chart. "Feelings" from the album briefly appeared in the SNEP Singles Chart. The trio also released the follow-up rendition "I'll Be There".

The trio released a follow-up album Love Me Tender in 2015. This was released posthumously as Érick Bamy part of the trio had died on 27 November 2014.

== Members ==
Vigon Bamy Jay is made up of:

=== Vigon ===
Refer to French Wikipedia

Born 13 July 1945 in Rabat, Morocco (real name Abdelghafour Mouhsine) . Vigon had created a great buzz in 2011 singing James Brown's "I Feel Good" in season 1 of the French The Voice: la plus belle voix with (season 1) at the age of 67 being the oldest of the show's contestants.

=== Érick Bamy ===
Refer to French Wikipedia

Born 30 November 1949 in Guadeloupe, Bamy, also known as Érick Stevens, was part of Johnny Hallyday's backing vocal group. He had become a finalist in French Got talent called La France a un incroyable talent on M6. He died on 27 November 2014.

=== Jay ===
Refer to French Wikipedia

Johan Legiel, known as Jay, born 7 April 1979 in Seine-Saint-Denis was a member of the group Poetic Lover and Class Vegas and a number of successful French musicals.

== Discography ==
=== Albums ===
Year	Album	Peak positions	Certification
Year	Album	FRA	Certification
2013	Les Soul Men	7	Gold
2015	Love Me Tender	37	

=== Singles ===
Year	Single	Peak positions	Album
Year	Single	FRA	Album
2013	"Feelings"	117	Les Soul Men
2013	"I'll Be There"	–	Les Soul Men
