= Vigon (artist) =

Musical artist

Vigon محسن عبد الغفور
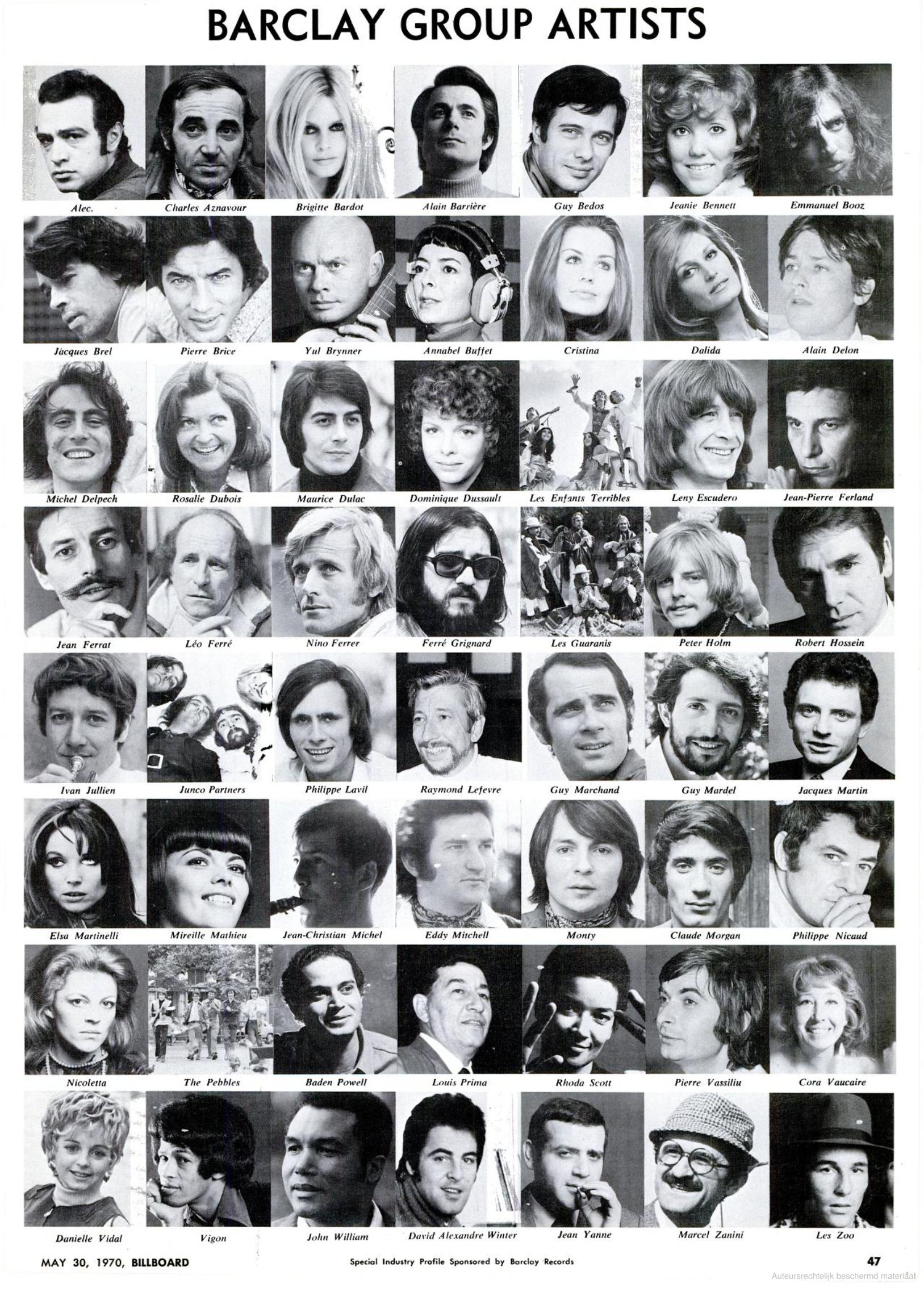
- Vigon (bottom row, second from left) in 1970

Background information
- Born: Mohsine Abdelghafour; 13 June 1945 (age 80); Rabat, Morocco
- Genres: Funk; soul; rhythm and blues
- Occupations: Singer; songwriter; record producer; dancer; bandleader
- Instrument: Vocals
- Years active: 1965–present

Vigon (Arabic: فيغون; born Mohsine Abdelghafour (Arabic: محسن عبد الغفور) on 13 July 1945) is a Moroccan singer, songwriter, record producer, dancer and bandleader. He had created a great buzz in 2011 singing James Brown's "I Feel Good" in season 1 of the French The Voice: la plus belle voix with (season 1) at the age of 67 being the oldest the show's contestants.
