= Nicole Beharie =

American actress and singer

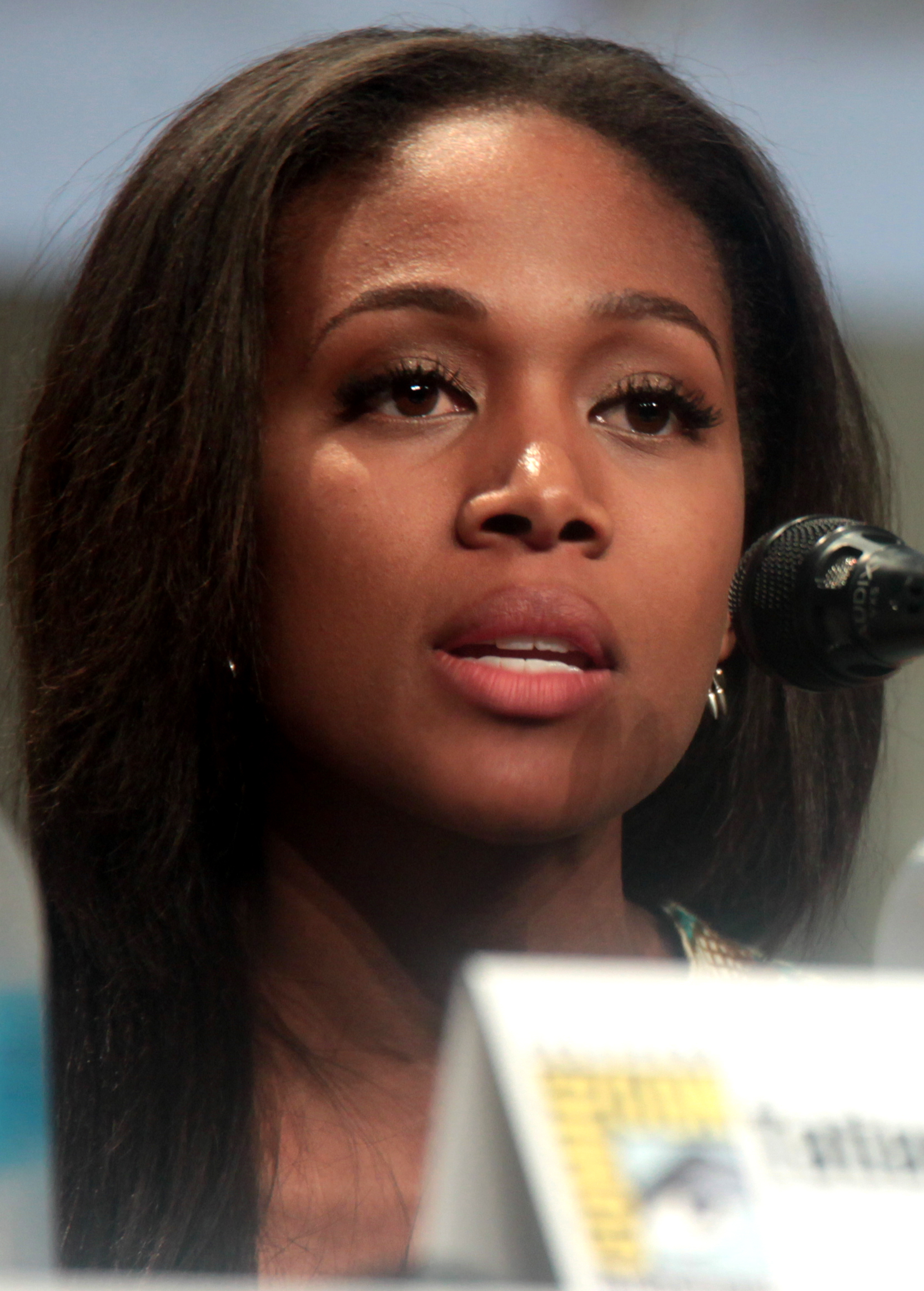
- Beharie in 2014
- Born: West Palm Beach, Florida, U.S.
- Other name: Nikki Beharie
- Education: Juilliard School (BFA)
- Occupations: Actress; singer
- Years active: 2008–present

Nicole Beharie is an American actress. She is best known for her starring roles in films such as the drama American Violet (2008), the psychological drama Shame (2011), the biographical sports drama 42 (2013), and the independent drama Miss Juneteenth (2020).

From 2013 to 2016, Beharie starred in the Fox supernatural drama series Sleepy Hollow. She went on to appear on the Netflix anthology series Black Mirror (2019). In 2023, she joined the cast of the Apple TV+ drama series The Morning Show, which earned her a nomination for the Primetime Emmy Award for Outstanding Supporting Actress in a Drama Series.

== Early life ==
Beharie was born in West Palm Beach, Florida. Her father is African-American, and her mother is Jamaican. When Beharie was a child, her father was in the United States Foreign Service, and she lived in the United Kingdom, Nigeria, and Panama. She attended Orangeburg Wilkinson High School in Orangeburg, South Carolina and is a 2003 graduate of the South Carolina Governor's School for the Arts & Humanities. A public residential high school in Greenville. Beharie was then accepted into Juilliard School (Drama division Group 36: 2003–07). She was awarded a Shakespeare scholarship and trained in England.

== Career ==
Beharie made her feature film debut in the 2008 film American Violet, where she played the leading role. Also in the same year she played Sarah Ward in the American sports film The Express: The Ernie Davis Story opposite actor Rob Brown. In the Lifetime movie, Sins of the Mother (2010), Beharie portrayed Shay Hunter, a struggling university student who goes on a journey to mend her fractured relationship with her mother Nona played by Jill Scott.

In 2011, Beharie performed five original songs as a singer-songwriter opposite German actor Ken Duken in the romantic drama My Last Day Without You. In the Russell Leigh Sharman film adaptation of his play Apartment 4E, she played Piper, a troubled young woman who never leaves her apartment. Beharie played Marianne in the Steve McQueen film Shame, portraying a love interest of Michael Fassbender. Wesley Morris of The Boston Globe praised her performance, calling her "a marvel of natural transparency".

In 2013, Beharie starred as Rachel Robinson, wife of Jackie Robinson (played by Chadwick Boseman), in the historical baseball feature 42. The same year, she began portraying Abbie Mills on the Fox fantasy series Sleepy Hollow, which is based on the 1820 short story "The Legend of Sleepy Hollow" by Washington Irving. In early 2016, Beharie departed the series, with her character dying in the series' third-season finale, the episode entitled "Ragnarok", which was aired April 8, 2016. She later stated that an autoimmune disease was one of the causes of her exit and also revealed that she struggled to find work and was labelled as problematic after her departure from the show.

In 2020, she starred in Miss Juneteenth, a film about a former pageant winner preparing her teenage daughter to assume her former crown. In 2023, she joined the cast of season three of the Apple TV+ series The Morning Show. Her performance in the series earned her a nomination for the Primetime Emmy Award for Outstanding Supporting Actress in a Drama Series.

In September 2025, it was announced that Beharie was signed on to the Netflix's crime drama series adaptation All the Sinners Bleed, based on the eponymous novel by S.A. Cosby. The series begins filming in Georgia in early November.

== Filmography ==
=== Film ===
Year	Title	Role	Notes
2008	American Violet	Dee Roberts	
2008	The Express: The Ernie Davis Story	Sarah Ward	
2011	My Last Day Without You	Leticia Johnson	
2011	Shame	Marianne	
2012	Apartment 4E	Piper	
2012	The Last Fall	Faith Davis	
2012	The Mirror Between Us	Zora	Short film
2012	Woman Thou Art Loosed: On the 7th Day	Beth Hutchins	
2013	42	Rachel Robinson	
2018	Monsters and Men	Michelle	
2019	Jacob's Ladder	Samantha Singer	
2020	Miss Juneteenth	Turquoise Jones	
2022	Breaking	Estel Valerie	
2022	Honk for Jesus. Save Your Soul.	Shakura Sumpter	
2025	Love, Brooklyn	Casey	
2026	Killing Castro	TBA	
2026	By Any Means	Allison Strider	

=== Television ===
Year	Title	Role	Notes
2009	Three Rivers	Helen Reed	Episode: "Win-loss"
2010	Sins of the Mother	Shay	Television film
2011	The Good Wife	Imani Stonehouse	2 episodes
2012	Law & Order: Special Victims Unit	Tracy Harrison	Episode: "Child's Welfare"
2013–2016	Sleepy Hollow	Abbie Mills / Witness	Main role (50 episodes)
2015	Bones	Abbie Mills	Episode: "The Resurrection in the Remains"
2017	AfroPop: The Ultimate Cultural Exchange	Host	5 episodes
2019	Black Mirror	Theo	Episode: "Striking Vipers"; Credited as Nikki Beharie
2020	Little Fires Everywhere	Madeline Ryan	Episode: "The Uncanny"
2020	Monsterland	Annie	Episode: "New Orleans, LA"
2021	Solos	Nera	Anthology series
2021	Scenes from a Marriage	Kate	2 episodes
2023 - Present	The Morning Show	Christina Hunter	Main role (Season 3-Present)
TBA	All the Sinners Bleed †	Darlene	In production as of November 2025

== Theatre ==
Year	Title	Role	Venue
2010–11	A Free Man of Color	Margery Jolicoeur	Vivian Beaumont Theatre (Broadway)

== Soundtrack appearances ==
Year	Album	Songs
2013	My Last Day Without You	"Two Hands", "Catch Me", "Morning Light", "Scars", "My Last Day Without You"

== Awards and nominations ==
Year	Association	Category	Nominated work	Result
2009	African-American Film Critics	Best Actress	American Violet	Won
2010	Black Reel Awards	Best Actress	American Violet	Nominated
2010	Black Reel Awards	Best Breakthrough Performance	American Violet	Nominated
2010	Black Reel Awards	Best Ensemble	American Violet	Nominated
2012	Black Reel Awards	Best Song	My Last Day Without You	Nominated
2014	NAACP Image Awards	Outstanding Actress in a Drama Series	Sleepy Hollow	Nominated
2015	NAACP Image Awards	Outstanding Actress in a Drama Series	Sleepy Hollow	Nominated
2015	Fangoria Chainsaw Awards	Favorite Actress on Television	Sleepy Hollow	Nominated
2021	Gotham Independent Film Awards	Best Actress	Miss Juneteenth	Won
2021	Independent Spirit Awards	Best Female Lead	Miss Juneteenth	Nominated
2024	Black Reel Awards	Outstanding Supporting Performance in a Drama Series	The Morning Show	Won
2024	Critics' Choice Television Awards	Best Supporting Actress in a Drama Series	The Morning Show	Nominated
2024	Primetime Emmy Awards	Outstanding Supporting Actress in a Drama Series	The Morning Show	Nominated
2024	Screen Actors Guild Awards	Outstanding Performance by an Ensemble in a Drama Series	The Morning Show	Nominated
