= Martin Torgoff =

American film director

Martin Torgoff (born November 29, 1952) is an American journalist, author, documentary filmmaker, and writer, director and producer of television, who has worked extensively in the fields of music and American popular culture. He is best known for his book "Can’t Find My Way Home: America In the Great Stoned Age, 1945-2000" (2004) a narrative cultural history of illicit drugs, and for "The Drug Years", the series for VH1 and Sundance that Torgoff wrote and appeared in, which was based on his book. Over the span of his forty-year career, his work has encompassed music, art, film, theater, literature, politics, biography, history, race, sociology, sexuality, and celebrity culture.

== Background and education ==
Torgoff was born in New York City and grew up in Glen Cove, on Long Island. He is the son of Bess Kagan and Irving Torgoff, a two time All American basketball player at LIU who later became a notable player in the NBA as the first “sixth man” in pro basketball history when he played for Red Auerbach's Washington Capitols. Torgoff grew up playing sports before being swept up in the turbulence of the late 1960s as a teenager, becoming one of the leaders of the student strike at his high school after the shootings at Kent State in May 1970. He attended SUNY Cortland and the University of Neuchatel, Switzerland, receiving BAs in both History and French.

== Career ==
=== Publishing ===
In 1976, at the age of twenty-two, Torgoff was hired as associate editor of Grosset & Dunlap Publishers in New York, which brought him into the literary world. He specialized in oversized illustrated books that reflected his diverse interests like The Woody Guthrie Songbook and The Things I Love by Liberace, early examples of what would become a whole trend of “scrapbooks” in trade publishing.

=== Early books ===
Torgoff left publishing and wrote an inside account of the decline and death of Elvis Presley titled Elvis: We Love You Tender (1980). Torgoff then edited an anthology and comprehensive reference work on Presley's life and work, The Complete Elvis (1981). In 1986, he published American Fool: The Roots and Improbable Rise of John ‘Cougar’ Mellencamp, a book-length portrait of the artist which charted his odyssey from Seymour, Indiana, through the music industry. The book was awarded the ASCAP Deems Taylor Award for excellence in music journalism.

=== Journalism ===
Torgoff's first book on Elvis brought him to the attention of artist Andy Warhol and the editors of his magazine, Interview, where Torgoff became a Contributing Editor and published numerous cover stories from 1980 to Warhol's death in 1987.

=== Music video era ===
With the advent of MTV, Torgoff's interests turned to film and television, and he began writing, directing and producing short and long-form pieces about musical and pop cultural subjects that have appeared on CBS, HBO/Cinemax, public television, and other cable channels.

=== Elvis '56 ===
In 1987, Torgoff wrote "Elvis '56," an hour-long film about that single meteoric year in Presley's life. Produced by the Academy Award-winning documentarians Alan and Susan Raymond and narrated by Levon Helm, the film was nominated as Best Documentary at the USA Film Festival and acclaimed by Rolling Stone "as not only the best film ever made about Elvis, but also one of the best ever produced on a rock and roll figure" —“never has it been presented with such drama and with such an awareness of the political and social character of the time...by focusing on Elvis’s early promise, Elvis ’56 manages to capture much of the pure shock of rock and roll when it was new.”

=== Can't Find My Way Home ===
In 1992, Torgoff began a major work of non-fiction about how the use of illicit drugs shaped the entire cultural landscape of America during the post war era. The book published as Can't Find My Way Home in 2004 took twelve years and involved hundreds of interviews, journeying from the arrival of heroin to the streets of Harlem in 1947 to the Ecstasy/Rave culture of the new millennium. Duane Davis of the Rocky Mountain News compared the book to Tom Wolfe's Electric Kool Aid Acid Test and Norman Mailer's Armies of the Night. The New York Times called it “An exuberant chronicle of ecstatic inebriation, delusional utopianism, wretched excess and chastened nostalgia for lost highs.”

=== Television ===
After his last book, Torgoff wrote three multi-part series that were co-productions of VH-1 and Sundance, also serving as Consulting Producer on each: The Drug Years (2006) which was based on his book, Sex: The Revolution (2008), a cultural history of the sexual revolution in America; and Lords of the Revolution. As Torgoff appeared in The Drug Years and Sex as a principal commentator and narrator, he became a recognized TV personality and expert on the pop cultural landscape of the baby boom era. Torgoff then formed Prodigious Media with Richard Lowe. Their first project was the feature-length documentary for VH-1, Planet Rock: The Story of Hip Hop and the Crack Generation (2012), which Torgoff co-wrote, produced and directed with Lowe. Narrated by Ice-T, Planet Rock was about the ascent of hip hop during the controversial crack era of 1986–1992, as told from the point of view of four individuals who at one time were all teenaged crack dealers in inner city neighborhoods—Snoop Dogg and B-Real in Los Angeles, and RZA and Raekwon of Wu-Tang Clan in New York—who all escaped the violence and madness of the crack trade to become seminal hip hop artists. The film also fully explores the political, sociological, and racial dimensions of the story. Rolling Stone described the film as “impossibly thorough…visceral and severe, going far beyond the places where drugs and music collide… a fantastic counterpoint to the sensationalistic media coverage that ran rampant under Nancy Reagan.”

=== Bop Apocalypse: Jazz, Race, the Beats and Drugs ===
Whereas Can't Find My Way Home told the story of how illicit drugs traveled from the underground to the mainstream and changed the cultural landscape of America, Torgoff's fifth book, Bop Apocalypse (Da Capo Press, 2017,) tells the story of the underground and how the use of drugs entered the DNA of American culture in the first place. The narrative connects the birth of jazz in New Orleans, the first drug laws, Louis Armstrong, Mezz Mezzrow, Harry Anslinger and the Federal Bureau of Narcotics, swing, Lester Young, Billie Holiday, the Savoy Ballroom, Reefer Madness, Charlie Parker, the birth of bebop, the coming of heroin to Harlem, and the rise of the Beat Generation. The book also examines the template of racism in the formulation of American drug laws, policy and enforcement, as well as the attitudes and policies regarding addiction. Kirkus called the book "A comprehensive and compassionate account of the intersections of jazz, race, and drugs in 20th-century America...A textured story of human hope and hopelessness, of artistry that blossomed in the most daunting and, in some cases, demeaning circumstances."

=== Honors ===
Torgoff received the ASCAP Deems Taylor Award for his book American Fool. The Drug Years and Planet Rock both received CINE Golden Eagle awards. Planet Rock was nominated for Emmys for both Outstanding Programming Arts & Culture and Outstanding Achievement in a Craft: Writing.

== Personal life ==
Torgoff is married to Laura Last, who is the Executive Liaison to Jim Tisch, chairman and CEO of the Loews Corporation. They have one son, William, and live in Westchester.
