= Maiysha =

American singer-songwriter

- Born: April 16, 1978 (age 48)
- Origin: Minneapolis, Minnesota, USA
- Genres: Pop; R&B; soul; urban; progressive
- Occupations: Singer; Songwriter; Model; Journalist; Editor
- Years active: 2003 – Present
- Label: Eusonia
- Website: www.maiysha.com

For the 1974 composition by Miles Davis see Get Up with It.

Maiysha Kai (born April 16, 1978), known professionally as Maiysha, is an American R&B recording artist, songwriter, and journalist. She has released two albums, This Much is True in 2008 and UnderCover in 2010.

== Early life ==
Born in Minneapolis, Minnesota, United States, Maiysha attended Sarah Lawrence College where she studied vocal performance as well as creative writing and race and gender studies. After graduating, Maiysha moved to New York City to teach at a private school in Manhattan. She also was signed to Ford Models.

== Career ==
Her first album, This Much is True was released August 26, 2008. It was the first release on the Eusonia label. The album was produced by Scott Jacoby, and features 12 original tracks and a cover of Peter Gabriel's "Sledgehammer". The album also features a duet with Martin Luther. The album received press in USA Today, Newsweek, and TV Guide.

Maiysha's first single off the album, "Wanna Be", was released to iTunes on June 24, 2008. Maiysha was nominated for a 2009 Grammy Award for Best Urban/Alternative Performance for "Wanna Be".

In 2010, she released a live album, UnderCover, via Eusonia. The album was recorded at the Blue Note Jazz Club in Manhattan.

Maiysha is the lifestyle editor at The Grio and former managing editor for the website The Root's vertical, The Glow Up.
