= Grease Live! (Music from the Television Event) =

2016 soundtrack album by various artists

Soundtrack album by Various artists
- Released: January 31, 2016
- Recorded: 2016
- Studio: Capitol Records Building
- Genres: Rock and roll; musical theatre
- Length: 46:29
- Labels: Paramount Music; Republic Records

Singles from Grease Live! (Music from the Television Event)
- 1. "All I Need Is an Angel" Released: January 25, 2016; 2. "Grease (Is the Word)" Released: January 28, 2016

Grease Live! (Music from the Television Event) is the soundtrack to the 2016 live produced musical television special Grease Live!, a remake of the 1978 film Grease. The album was released on January 31, 2016 by Paramount Music in digital and physical formats, the same day as its television broadcast on Fox. The album featured songs from the film and eponymous stage musical, performed by the cast members featured in the television special. Four bonus tracks were included in the physical form of the soundtrack, released exclusively by Target Corporation through Republic Records on February 27, 2016.

The musical also featured five tracks written specifically for the show, with one being titled "All I Need Is an Angel" performed by Carly Rae Jepsen, was one of the two singles accompanying the soundtrack; the latter is a rendition of the titular track by Jessie J. The album debuted at number 37 on the US Billboard 200, earning 13,000 album-equivalent units in its first week, with just over 9,000 coming from pure sales. and further debuted at number 1 the same week on the Top Album Sales chart.

== Background ==
The live production featured three tracks that were specially made in the stage musical and not included in the film, which include "Freddy, My Love" and "Those Magic Changes", which are performed respectively by Keke Palmer and Jordan Fisher. Although not featuring in the musical as well as in the film, the song "Cake by the Ocean" performed by Joe Jonas' DNCE band was included in the musical as well as the accompanying album.

The song "All I Need Is an Angel" was specifically written for the production, by Tom Kitt and Brian Yorkey and performed by Carly Rae Jepsen. Jepsen who plays Frenchy, who did not have a musical number in the 1978 film. Hence, Marc Platt who executive produced the special, said "she has such a wish fulfillment — she's the one who gets a teen angel in all the productions of Grease —that giving her a musical moment felt really organic to the story and really great for a character who otherwise doesn't have a musical moment. And then when we ended up casting Carly Rae Jepsen in it, it felt like well there's even more of a reason because who doesn't want to hear her sing? So it's all those elements combined together and thankfully we came up with a song we all loved that fits the narrative and furthers the narrative so it's a happy win for everyone."

Although the musical featured over 23 songs performed by the cast, only 19 of them being included in the soundtracks. The songs "Alma Mater" (performed by Ana Gasteyer and Haneefah Wood) and "Mooning" (performed by DNCE) were not included in any version of the album. "It's Raining on Prom Night", only featured as a background music in the special.

== Track listing ==
No.	Title	Performer(s)	Length
1.	"Grease (Is the Word)"	Jessie J	3:21
2.	"Summer Nights"	Grease Live cast	3:38
3.	"Freddy, My Love"	Keke Palmer	2:47
4.	"Look at Me, I'm Sandra Dee"	Vanessa Hudgens	1:41
5.	"Greased Lightnin'"	Aaron Tveit and Carlos PenaVega	3:16
6.	"Those Magic Changes"	Jordan Fisher and Aaron Tveit	3:52
7.	"All I Need Is an Angel"	Carly Rae Jepsen	3:10
8.	"Beauty School Dropout"	Boyz II Men	3:52
9.	"Cake by the Ocean"	DNCE	2:43
10.	"Maybe (Baby)"	DNCE	1:35
11.	"Born to Hand Jive"	DNCE	4:47
12.	"Hopelessly Devoted to You"	Julianne Hough	3:04
13.	"Sandy"	Aaron Tveit	2:35
14.	"There Are Worse Things I Could Do"	Vanessa Hudgens	2:35
15.	"You're the One That I Want"	Julianne Hough and Aaron Tveit	3:01
16.	"We Go Together"	Grease Live cast	3:12
Total length:			46:29

Target bonus tracks
No.	Title	Performer(s)	Length
17.	"Rock n' Roll Party Queen"	DNCE	2:08
18.	"Rock n' Roll Is Here to Stay"	DNCE	2:03
19.	"Look at Me, I'm Sandra Dee (Reprise)"	Julianne Hough	1:33
20.	"Grease (Is the Word)" (Karaoke version)	Instrumental	3:22
Total length:			55:35

== Charts ==
Chart (2016)	Peak position
Australian Albums (ARIA)	85
US Billboard 200	37
US Billboard Top Soundtracks	1

== Personnel ==
- Randal Kleiser – conductor, keyboards
- Brian Kilgore – percussion
- Dave Kendrick – lead guitar
- John Wilson – rhythm guitar
- Taylor Hale – bass
- Chad Timon – drums
- Isaiah Miller – piano, keyboards
- Lindsey Stirling, David Garrett – violins
- Laura Freeman – viola
- Joshua Alexander Sykes – cello
- Nick Payton, Kail Graham – trumpets
- Lil' Joey – trombone
- Ray Hanson, Kirk Sanborn – saxophones, flutes
- Arnold McCuller, Dorian Holley, Fred White, Emily Stevens, Kathy Gray, Siedah Garrett – vocals
- Bob Garrett – vocal director
- Jared Stein – conductor
- Charlie Bisharat – concertmaster
- Kuk Harrell, Tom Kitt, Scott M. Riesett – producer
- Steve Genewick – engineer
- Alan Armitage, Mike Lawson, Matt Teacher – assistant engineer
- Frank Wolf – mixing
- Gavin Lurssen – mastering
