= Zoe Ever After =

2016 American TV sitcom

- Poster
- Genre: Sitcom
- Created by: Erica Montolfo-Bura
- Starring: Brandy; Dorian Missick; Tory Devon Smith; Haneefah Wood; Ignacio Serricchio; Jaylon Gordon
- Composer: Kurt Farquhar
- Country of origin: United States
- Original language: English
- No. of seasons: 1
- No. of episodes: 8

Production
- Executive producers: Debra Martin-Chase; Danny Rose; Scooter Braun; Erica Montolfo-Bura; Elaine Aronson; Brandy Norwood
- Camera setup: Multi-camera
- Running time: 30 minutes
- Production companies: Scooter Braun Projects; Martin Chase Productions; BET Original Productions

Original release
- Network: BET
- Release: January 5 – February 16, 2016

Zoe Ever After is an American sitcom starring Brandy Norwood as Zoe Moon, a recent divorcee who starts her own cosmetics company. The show was Norwood's first leading role in a television series since Moesha (1996–2001) premiered twenty years prior. The show premiered on BET January 5, 2016. It is filmed in Atlanta, Georgia. The series ended on February 16.

== Overview ==
Zoe Ever After centers on Zoe Moon (Norwood), a newly single mom stepping out of the shadow of her famous boxer ex-husband Gemini Moon (Missick) while trying to balance dating, motherhood, a complicated relationship with her ex and finally fulfilling her career dream of starting a cosmetics line. Gordon plays her 8-year-old son Xavier; Smith is Valenté, her fashion-forward and fun assistant; Wood plays Pearl, her publicist and best friend; and Serricchio is sexy contractor Miguel. The show is set in Manhattan, New York.

== Cast and characters ==
=== Main ===
- Brandy Norwood as Zoe Moon – Zoe is recently divorced. She tries to balance dating, a complicated relationship with her ex, and motherhood- all while maintaining her entrepreneurship regarding a cosmetics line.
- Dorian Missick as Gemini Moon – Gemini is a famous boxer and the ex-husband of Zoe.
- Ignacio Serricchio as Miguel Maldonado – Owner of "Maldonado Construction, Heating and Air" and Zoe's contractor, hired by Gemini.
- Tory Devon Smith as Valente – Zoe's assistant and friend.
- Haneefah Wood as Pearl – Zoe's publicist and best friend from college. She uses her business knowledge to try to find a husband.
- Jaylon Gordon as Xavier Moon – Zoe and Gemini's eight-year-old son.

=== Recurring ===
- Pej Vahdat as Amir – Doorman in Zoe's building.

=== Guest stars ===
- India Arie as herself – (Episode 1)
- Jessica White as herself – (Episodes 2 and 4)
- Tatyana Ali as Ashley King (Episodes 6 and 7)
- Jordin Sparks as herself (Episode 7)
- Jasmine Guy as Barbara Jean (Episode 8)
- Thomas Mikal Ford as James Jean (Episode 8)

== Episodes ==
No.	Title	Directed by	Written by	Original release date	U.S. viewers (millions)
1	"Pilot"	Stan Lathan	Erica Montolfo-Bura	January 5, 2016 (Note: Prior to the airing of the pilot, BET released the episode online for a limited time, garnering over a million views via the BET Now app and their Facebook page.)	0.85
2	"The Third Wheel Gets Slapped"	Stan Lathan	Sonja Warfield	January 12, 2016	0.64
3	"The Smoke Alarm Always Rings Twice"	Stan Lathan	Cameron Johnson & Cydney Kelley	January 19, 2016	0.72
4	"Woulda, Coulda, Almost, What?"	Stan Lathan	Elaine Aronson	January 26, 2016	0.62
5	"Ghost"	Henry Chan	Erica Montolfo-Bura	February 2, 2016	0.59
6	"The Interview"	Henry Chan	David A. Arnold	February 9, 2016	0.49
7	"Game Face"	Henry Chan	Elaine Aronson	February 16, 2016	0.53
8	"2 Weddings and an Ass Whooping"	Henry Chan	Erica Montolfo-Bura	February 16, 2016	0.54
