= Schooled (TV series) =

American television series

- Genre: Sitcom
- Created by: Adam F. Goldberg; Marc Firek
- Starring: AJ Michalka; Tim Meadows; Bryan Callen; Brett Dier; Haneefah Wood
- Narrated by: AJ Michalka
- Opening theme: "Those Were the Days" by Jaret and Kelly
- Composer: Michael Wandmacher
- Country of origin: United States
- Original language: English
- No. of seasons: 2
- No. of episodes: 34

Production
- Executive producers: Adam F. Goldberg; Marc Firek; Doug Robinson; David Katzenberg; David Guarascio; Andrew Secunda
- Cinematography: Steve Gainer
- Editors: Chris Kroll; William Marrinson; Kevin Leffler; Toby Yates
- Camera setup: Single-camera
- Running time: 21–22 minutes
- Production companies: Adam F. Goldberg Productions; Happy Madison Productions; Marc Firek Productions; Doug Robinson Productions; ABC Studios; Sony Pictures Television Studios (Note: Credited as Sony Pictures Television in season 1 and certain episodes of season 2.)

Original release
- Network: ABC
- Release: January 9, 2019 – May 13, 2020

Related
- The Goldbergs

Schooled is an American television sitcom and a direct spin-off to The Goldbergs. It was ordered by ABC with Tim Meadows, Bryan Callen and AJ Michalka in the main cast. The concept aired as a backdoor pilot on a January 24, 2018, episode of The Goldbergs called "The Goldbergs: 1990-Something". The series aired from January 9, 2019, to May 13, 2020. In May 2019, ABC renewed the series for a second season, which premiered on September 18, 2019. On May 12, 2020, the series was canceled after two seasons.

== Premise ==
In the 1990s, Lainey Lewis returns to Jenkintown, Pennsylvania from the West Coast, having seen her dreams of rock 'n roll stardom fizzle out. As fate would have it, her alma mater William Penn Academy has recently lost its music teacher and Lainey reluctantly accepts an offer to take over the job. While Rick Mellor is still the school's gym teacher and coach, John Glascott has just become the new principal after Earl Ball has moved on to a school board position. While finding her way, Lainey alternately butts heads with and receives advice from another young teacher, C.B. In season 2, Wilma Howell is hired to be the school's new biology teacher.

== Cast and characters ==
=== Main ===
- AJ Michalka as Lainey Lewis (Michalka also provides the voice-over narration for each episode)
- Tim Meadows as Principal John (Andre) Glascott
- Bryan Callen as Coach Rick Mellor
- Brett Dier as Charlie "C.B." Brown
- Haneefah Wood as Wilma Howell (season 2)

=== Recurring ===
Faculty and Staff:

- Lennon Parham as Liz Flemming
- Stephen Tobolowsky as Earl Ball
- Clancy Brown as Mr. Crosby
- Alphonso McAuley as Coop
- Ana Gasteyer as Susan Cinoman
- Greg Proops as Mr. Granger
- Tom Waters as Mr. Thomas
- Stephanie McVay as Petra
- Sean Marquette as Johnny Atkins
- Valerie Azlynn as Nurse Julie (Coach Rick's girlfriend)
- Michaela Watkins as Ms. Taraborelli

Students:

- Rachel Crow as Felicia, Glascott's niece
- Christian Gehring as Roxborough Ronnie
- Israel Johnson as Ed
- Dallas Edwards as Aaron
- Jeffrey Cade Ross Brown as Tom Scott
- Gabe Gibbs as Weasel
- Sofie Landsman as Jessica
- Abi Brittle as Becky
- Connor Cain as Bobby Maloney
- Bradley Steven Perry as Alec Raday
- Haley Tju as Marni
- Unicorn Rose as Veronica
- Mason McNulty as Toby Murphy
- Thomas Barbusca as Alex Piper

=== Special guests ===
- Troy Gentile as Dr. Barry Goldberg
- Wendi McLendon-Covey as Beverly Goldberg
- Hayley Orrantia as Erica Goldberg
- Karan Brar as Reza Alavi
- Bill Goldberg as Nick Mellor
- Shayne Topp as Matt Bradley

== Episodes ==
=== Series overview ===
| Season | Episodes | Originally released | |
| Season | Episodes | First released | Last released |
|---|---|---|---|
| 1 | 12 | January 9, 2019 | May 1, 2019 |
| 2 | 22 | September 18, 2019 | May 13, 2020 |

=== Season 1 (2019) ===
| No. overall | No. in season | Title | Directed by | Written by | Original release date | Prod. code | U.S. viewers (millions) |
|---|---|---|---|---|---|---|---|
| 1 | 1 | "Be Like Mike" | David Katzenberg | Marc Firek | January 9, 2019 | 101 | 4.82 |
After Lainey Lewis's music career doesn't take off, she takes a job as the new music teacher at William Penn Academy, but struggles adjusting to being on the other side of a teacher's desk. She finds herself tested when she clashes with Principal Glascott's niece, but eventually finds a way to inspire her. Meanwhile, Coach Mellor struggles to adapt to the changes in sports in the 1990s as Matt, his star basketball player, wants to be like Michael Jordan. Mellor challenges Matt to a game of Horse trying to get through to him and later inspires him to try out for football, leading to his eventual NFL career. Featured Songs: "Today" by The Smashing Pumpkins, "Good Vibrations" by Marky Mark and the Funky Bunch Cameo Interview: Matt Ryan and Coach Rick Mellor
| 2 | 2 | "Lainey's All That" | David Katzenberg | David Guarascio | January 16, 2019 | 102 | 4.05 |
Based on the movie She's All That. After Lainey sees the movie more than 18 times, she's inspired to give one of the students a makeover. Elsewhere, Principal Glascott and Coach Mellor both became smitten with the drama teacher. Meanwhile, CB makes a bet that he can turn Lainey into a better teacher. Featured Song: "Kiss Me" by Sixpence None the Richer Cameo Interview: Interviewed by his acting counterpart, Charlie “C.B.” Brown
| 3 | 3 | "Tamagotchis and Bells" | Jay Chandrasekhar | Michael J. Weithorn | January 23, 2019 | 104 | 4.42 |
Lainey tries to convince a controlling parent (Rob Riggle) to allow his son to perform in the bell chorus but meets resistance from Glascott when he informs her the parent is donating a computer lab to the school. In an effort to teach Glascott to stand up to domineering parents, Lainey recruits the greatest domineering parent of them all, Beverly Goldberg. Meanwhile, when Coach Mellor confiscates everyone's Tamagotchi and then starts playing with them, he becomes motivated to become a real parent and recruits a reluctant CB to help him. Featured Song: "Wonderwall" by Oasis Cameo Interview: Interviewed by her acting counterpart, Liz Flemming
| 4 | 4 | "I, Mellor" | David Katzenberg | Andrew Secunda | January 30, 2019 | 103 | 4.54 |
With Ms. Flemming burned out from coaching the school's mathlete team, perennial losers in the annual Math Olympics, Principal Glascott turns to Coach Mellor to motivate the team. Meanwhile, CB doesn't know how to handle a sarcastic bully (Thomas Barbusca) in his class, so he seeks advice from Lainey. Featured Song: "These Are Days" by 10,000 Maniacs Cameo Interview: Interviewed by Brett Dier, Alex Piper
| 5 | 5 | "Money for RENT" | David Katzenberg | Adam F. Goldberg & Chris Bishop | February 13, 2019 | 105 | 3.73 |
Frustrated with the public domain options for the school musical, Lainey spends her own money so her class can perform Rent. Coach Mellor gets mad when one of his star football players defects to take a lead role in the play, and he intentionally schedules a pep rally in the auditorium the same day as the performance. Elsewhere, CB is recruited to teach sex ed, but becomes uncomfortable with the questions the students ask. Cameo Interview: Interviewed by his acting counterpart, John Glascott
| 6 | 6 | "Rock for Jocks" | David Katzenberg | Peter Dirksen & Jonathan Howard | February 20, 2019 | 107 | 3.80 |
Earl Ball asks Lainey to teach an easy class for the school's top athletes but Coach Mellor, in an attempt to push his students to achieve their full potential, challenges her to actually teach the jocks. Meanwhile, Principal Glascott is worried that his niece will not get into a good college and resorts to bribery, first to get his niece to run for class president and then, when she actually shows genuine interest, to get her opponent to drop out of the race. Featured Songs: "All Star" by Smash Mouth, "Pump Up the Jam" by Technotronic Cameo Interview: Interviewed by his acting counterpart, Coach Rick Mellor
| 7 | 7 | "Kris Kross" | David Katzenberg | Kerri Doherty | February 27, 2019 | 108 | 3.52 |
Lainey and CB struggle to get the student body to conform to the school's dress code after two students come to school with their clothes worn backwards. They are further dismayed when the two students state their intentions to perform a Kris Kross song at the school talent show. Meanwhile, Principal Glascott seeks Coach Mellor's guidance on how to deal with the demands of his job. Featured Song: "Jump" by Kris Kross
| 8 | 8 | "Lainey and Erica's High School Reunion" | David Katzenberg | Story by : Vanessa Mancos; Teleplay by : Adam F. Goldberg & Chris Bishop & Matt Edsall & Jimmy Mosqueda | March 13, 2019 | 110 | 3.92 |
Lainey reunites with Erica Goldberg in time for the 10 year reunion at William Penn Academy. The pair think their lives have been mundane and decide to emulate a ploy similar to that of Romy & Michelle's High School Reunion to impress their former classmates. The ploy backfires when their old classmates see Lainey's picture in the hall, figuring out she is on the school staff. Meanwhile, Coach Mellor is dismayed that his protege, Ruben Amaro, Jr. does not reciprocate the same sentiment and considers Principal Glascott his greatest influence during his time at the school. Featured Song: "Wannabe" by Spice Girls
| 9 | 9 | "Darth Mellor" | Lea Thompson | Adam F. Goldberg & Chris Bishop & Andrew Secunda | March 20, 2019 | 109 | 3.61 |
C.B. and Coach Mellor get into a debate about Star Wars, after Mellor is invited to watch Episode I: The Phantom Menace by the sci-fi club. When Mellor shares his thoughts on the movie, which causes the club to disband, C.B. retaliates by giving his honest thoughts about baseball, which Mellor takes to heart. Meanwhile, Principal Glascott does not think he can trust his niece, Felicia and her intentions on getting her driver's license, and asks Lainey for help. Featured Song: "Ordinary World" by Duran Duran Cameo Interview: Interviewed by his acting counterpart, Charlie “C.B.” Brown
| 10 | 10 | "There's No Fighting in Fight Club" | David Katzenberg | David Guarascio | April 3, 2019 | 111 | 3.40 |
When two boys get in a fight, Glascott and CB are at odds over how to resolve the conflict. Meanwhile, Lainey takes over as cheerleading coach and, with surprising support from Coach Mellor, has to convince the football team that cheerleaders are athletes, too. Featured Song: "You Learn" by Alanis Morissette
| 11 | 11 | "Glascott Mascot" | Richie Keen | Vanessa McCarthy | April 10, 2019 | 106 | 3.82 |
Principal Glascott and Coach Mellor engage in a debate when Glascott opts to replace William Penn's longtime mascot with a less-intimidating cloud. Featured Songs: "Push" by Matchbox Twenty, "Sirius" by The Alan Parsons Project Cameo Interview: Interviewed by his acting counterpart, Johnny Atkins
| 12 | 12 | "CB Likes Lainey" | Jay Chandrasekhar | Jonathan Howard & Peter Dirksen | May 1, 2019 | 112 | 3.67 |
When a concert that music scouts attend and the school talent show fall on the same night, Lainey must choose between being a teacher and her rock star dreams. Ms. Cinoman tries to push CB into telling Lainey that he likes her. Meanwhile, Principal Glascott uses the task of building the school website to promote teamwork among his staff. Featured Song: "Ironic" by Alanis Morissette Cameo Interview: Interviewed by her acting counterpart, Susan Cinoman Note: This episode serves as the season 1 finale of Schooled.

=== Season 2 (2019–20) ===
| No. overall | No. in season | Title | Directed by | Written by | Original release date | Prod. code | U.S. viewers (millions) |
|---|---|---|---|---|---|---|---|
| 13 | 1 | "Dr. Barry" | David Katzenberg | Adam F. Goldberg & Marc Firek | September 18, 2019 | 113 | 1.99 |
Having not yet professed his feelings for Lainey, CB is distraught when Barry Goldberg, now a radiologist, shows up at the school and asks Lainey to move with him to Michigan. Elsewhere, Glascott's mishandling of the senior prank in full view of a school board auditor has him fearing he will have to step down as principal, but he gets support from a surprising source. Featured Song: "I'm Gonna Be (500 Miles)" by The Proclaimers Note: This episode serves as the season 2 premiere of Schooled.
| 14 | 2 | "Dangerous Minds" | David Katzenberg | Andrew Secunda | September 25, 2019 | 201 | 3.41 |
Inspired by the film Dangerous Minds, Lainey thinks she can affect change in the lives of her students, but giving them the number to her "portable" cellular phone starts to backfire. Having seen Lainey complete a tumultuous first year under his tutelage, Mellor looks for another young teacher to mentor and targets Coop. Several teachers, especially C.B., are taken aback by new biology teacher Wilma Howell and her tough methods of instruction. Featured Songs: "Gangsta's Paradise" by Coolio (featuring L.V.), "Butterfly" by Crazy Town
| 15 | 3 | "I'll Be There for You" | David Katzenberg | Story by : Vanessa McCarthy & Adam F. Goldberg; Teleplay by : Vanessa McCarthy | October 2, 2019 | 202 | 3.33 |
While talking with Lainey, Coach Mellor professes that he and Miss Cinoman are in a Ross-and-Rachel type relationship and just "on a break", even though it's been seven years since they last dated. Lainey learns that Miss Cinoman clearly thinks it's over, so she encourages Mellor to try speed dating. Elsewhere, Principal Glascott has to deal with increasing angry outbursts and demeaning behavior from Dr. Ness, the school librarian. He wants to take an approach of compassion and encouragement, but Wilma insists he has to be tough and fire Ness. Featured Song: "Hold On" by Wilson Phillips
| 16 | 4 | "The Rudy-ing of Toby Murphy" | Jay Chandrasekhar | Vijal Patel | October 9, 2019 | 204 | 3.30 |
After wimpy kid Toby Murphy watches the film Rudy in C.B.'s class, he tells Coach Mellor that he wants a shot to play on the football team. Mellor is hesitant, but after watching the movie himself, he has Toby suit up and runs a "fake Rudy" play in practice to make the kid feel good. All seems to be well until Julie, Toby's aunt and a woman Mellor is trying to impress, asks if Toby will be playing in the team's final home game. Meanwhile, Erica Goldberg tells Lainey she is too busy to attend a Boyz II Men concert with her, so Lainey tries to befriend Wilma. Boyz II Men (Nathan Morris, Shawn Stockman, Wanya Morris) performs a spoof of their hit Motownphilly. Featured Song: "Motownphilly" by Boyz II Men
| 17 | 5 | "Kick Like a Girl" | David Katzenberg | Peter Dirksen & Jonathan Howard | October 16, 2019 | 203 | 3.36 |
After seeing Felicia's prowess on the soccer field, Mellor and Glascott recruit her to be the kicker for the football team. However, when a boy Felicia likes starts seeing her as "one of the guys", she wants to quit. Elsewhere, Earl Ball reluctantly allows Lainey to be a chaperone for a class ski trip despite her history as a troublemaker on such trips. Co-chaperone C.B. uses the opportunity to try and spend some alone time with Lainey, but is constantly interrupted by Tom Scott's requests for romantic advice. Featured Songs: "Are You Ready for This (JM Mix)" by Josh Mobley and Chris Morton, "Bitter Sweet Symphony" by The Verve
| 18 | 6 | "Outbreak" | Lea Thompson | Kerri Doherty | October 23, 2019 | 205 | 3.10 |
A flu outbreak has Glascott scrambling for substitute teachers, and Lainey is passed over because she hasn't met the state's "minimum competency" requirements to teach academic classes. She learns the fastest route to getting certified is to take a night class at a community college, but backpedals after learning that C.B. is the instructor. Meanwhile, Mellor contracts the flu and has to miss a wrestling tournament that awards the coveted Jenkin Cup. Glascott steps in as coach, and his appeal to the wrestlers' emotions surprisingly results in victory. Featured Song: "One Week", "Call and Answer" by Barenaked Ladies
| 19 | 7 | "Run, Rick, Run" | David Katzenberg | Adam F. Goldberg | October 30, 2019 | 206 | 3.10 |
Mellor learns that Toby's Aunt Julie loves the movie Forrest Gump, so he plans to play Forrest for Halloween to Julie's Jenny. However, Mellor is soon heartbroken when Julie tells him she is being made Toby's legal guardian, as Glascott's rules prohibit teachers from dating a parent of any William Penn student. Elsewhere, the middle schoolers plan to scare the elementary students as they do their annual costume parade through the Academy, because that's what happened to them a few years ago, but C.B. and Lainey try to convince them otherwise. Featured Song: "(Everything I Do) I Do It For You" by Bryan Adams
| 20 | 8 | "Hakuna Matata" | Christine Lakin | Story by : Adam F. Goldberg & Vanessa McCarthy; Teleplay by : Adam F. Goldberg | November 6, 2019 | 207 | 3.19 |
When Earl Ball pushes Lainey to produce The Lion King for the annual school musical, she feels overwhelming pressure to top the success of Rent from last year. C.B. and Wilma offer their assistance, but it doesn't lessen Lainey's stress a bit. Elsewhere, Coach Mellor sees the athletic records he set as a student falling off the wall one by one, so he resorts to sabotage to keep the one record that remains: his 14-foot, 7-inch pole vault. Featured Song: "Circle of Life" by Jocelyn B. Smith
| 21 | 9 | "Friendsgiving" | Lea Thompson | Lisa K. Nelson | November 20, 2019 | 208 | 3.19 |
Despite a disinterested faculty, C.B. prepares a number of food items for his annual Friendsgiving party, which leads to his new home burning down. Realizing how much they've hurt their fellow teacher, the faculty rallies to support him and help replace his lost items. Meanwhile, Mellor and the equally competitive Wilma face off as coaches for the annual student Thanksgiving flag football game. Mellor tries to stack the deck by bringing in successful William Penn alumni to play for his team, leading to Wilma calling on Rick's brother, Nick (Bill Goldberg). Featured Song: "I'll Stand by You" by The Pretenders Cameo Interview: Interviewed by his acting counterpart, Charlie “C.B.” Brown
| 22 | 10 | "The Pokémon Society" | Christine Lakin | Donielle Muransky | December 4, 2019 | 209 | 3.14 |
Attempting to bond with Toby, Mellor tries to learn all he can from C.B. about the Pokémon craze so he can support Toby at his Pokémon card tournaments. However, Mellor's competitive nature soon takes over. Meanwhile, Lainey takes a second job at a video rental store, but soon finds that students won't rent anything with her at the counter. To win them over, she agrees to secretly replace their videotapes with R-rated movies, but this soon backfires. Also, Lainey learns that Weasel likes singing, and gets him to overcome his fear of backlash from the jocks to perform a song on stage. Featured Song: "I Don't Want to Miss a Thing" by Diane Warren / Aerosmith and "Party Up" by DMX
| 23 | 11 | "Beanie Babies" | David Katzenberg | Matt Edsall & Jonathan Howard & Peter Dirksen | December 11, 2019 | 210 | 3.01 |
Upon learning that Lainey is desperate to get her hands on a Patti the Platypus Beanie Baby, C.B. becomes intent on locating one and buying it for her to prove how much she means to him. After one failed attempt, he enlists Mellor's help, only to find Barry Goldberg in line looking for the same thing. Meanwhile, Glascott is determined to have a more inclusive holiday concert and insists that his niece Felicia take the lead in doing a song about Kwanzaa. Felicia is not thrilled with the idea, and fights back by having multiple students try to work in something from nearly every holiday tradition around the globe. Featured Song: "You Gotta Be" by Des'ree
| 24 | 12 | "Boy Bands" | Lea Thompson | Matt Edsall & Adam F. Goldberg | January 15, 2020 | 211 | 2.86 |
In order to dispel the myth among her students that she's scary and mean, Wilma encourages Ronnie and other male students to form a boy band. Unfortunately their first music video turns out so bad, even they can't stand it. Meanwhile, Coach Mellor tries to convince Principal Glascott to hire Toby's Aunt Julie (and his girlfriend) as the new school nurse, in spite of his hesitation over having couples working together. Featured Song: "As Long as You Love Me" by Backstreet Boys
| 25 | 13 | "FeMellor" | Jay Chandrasekhar | Vanessa McCarthy & Tom Hertz | January 22, 2020 | 213 | 3.01 |
Students and teachers alike (especially Lainey) are being targeted left and right for violating the William Penn Academy dress code. Meanwhile, Coach Mellor fears his relationship with Nurse Julie is threatened when he finds out she's not a sports fan. Featured Song: "Closer to Fine" by Indigo Girls
| 26 | 14 | "Titanic Love" | David Katzenberg | Adam F. Goldberg & Tom Hertz | January 29, 2020 | 212 | 2.89 |
As the blockbuster movie Titanic is all the rage at William Penn, Lainey urges C.B. to go see it with her. C.B. resists at first, but eventually agrees. Upset about Lainey comparing the love story between Jack and Rose to herself and Barry, C.B. reacts by pointing out flaws in the film. He further announces that it's time to "move on" and move out of Lainey's place. Lainey eventually catches on that she is the girl C.B. can't get over. Meanwhile, Mellor is despondent after his star quarterback suffers an injury on the eve of the longstanding grudge match with Germantown. When it becomes obvious that William Penn can't win, Mellor takes advice from Glascott on how to lose gracefully. Featured Song: "My Heart Will Go On" by Celine Dion
| 27 | 15 | "Singled Out" | David Katzenberg | Vijal Patel & Andrew Secunda | February 12, 2020 | 214 | 2.91 |
Glascott decides to recreate the game show Singled Out for a school charity event, with himself as host and Lainey as the contestant. Lainey is certain that Barry Goldberg will emerge as her perfect match. However, after all other men are weeded out, both Barry and C.B. continue to correctly answer every question about Lainey, resulting in a tie. Meanwhile, Glascott tries to convince Felicia that she's both beautiful and accomplished after learning she feels too body-conscious to participate in swim class. Featured Song: "Unpretty" by TLC
| 28 | 16 | "Moving On" | Christine Lakin | Emily Ann Brandstetter | February 19, 2020 | 215 | 2.93 |
Upon realizing that Lainey is still committed to make things work with Barry, CB finds it difficult to move on and leave his feelings behind, but he gets support from Wilma and Mellor. Meanwhile, Lainey mentors Claudia, a student who is having strained relations with her mother, which forces Lainey to confront her own past family issues. Featured Songs: "You Get What You Give" by New Radicals, "Raghat Boogie" by Kevin Reardon
| 29 | 17 | "Rock Star" | David Katzenberg | Kerri Doherty | March 18, 2020 | 216 | 3.39 |
Lainey gets jealous upon hearing Wilma sing much better than she does, and acts out to prevent losing her status as the school's rock star. Meanwhile, Coach Mellor and Nurse Julie have differing views on how Toby should handle being targeted by a bully. Featured Song: "What's Up?" (cover version) by Haneefah Wood and AJ Michalka
| 30 | 18 | "Garden Party" | David Katzenberg | Donielle Muransky | March 25, 2020 | 217 | 3.20 |
When Wilma and Mellor put the school's new community vegetable garden right in Earl Ball's board member parking spot, Ball decides to take it out on Glascott, who is reluctant to challenge his predecessor. Meanwhile, CB sacrifices being a good teacher for Weasel in order to hang with his cool dad Greg (Hayes MacArthur), who can get CB tickets to events at The Spectrum. Featured Song: "Don't Look Back in Anger" by Oasis
| 31 | 19 | "Lainey's Mom" | Melissa Joan Hart | Lisa K. Nelson | April 1, 2020 | 218 | 3.23 |
Coach Mellor convinces Lainey to take a drive to Altoona and make peace with her estranged mother, Deb (Megyn Price). Lainey learns that Deb has gotten sober, but is soon disappointed when she realizes her mom has been sober for five years and never tried to make contact. At school, Wilma is excited to have the talented Caroline (Olivia Taylor Cohen) join the robotics team, but runs into problems upon seeing that Caroline is a pompous know-it-all who won't work with her teammates. Featured Song: "Thank U" by Alanis Morissette
| 32 | 20 | "Principal for a Day" | Lea Thompson | Matthew Edsall | April 15, 2020 | 219 | 3.28 |
With Glascott needing to have a bunion removed, he asks CB to assume the role of principal while he's out. Lainey tries to help CB when a problem arises with some mean girls, having experienced such groups before, but the power-hungry CB refuses to listen. Elsewhere, Julie is working toward earning her nurse practitioner certification, and Mellor becomes jealous when he learns her study partner, Leslie, is a man (James Lesure). Worse, Julie says she will be leaving the school to work in a hospital after getting her certification. Featured Song: "Hold My Hand" by Hootie & the Blowfish
| 33 | 21 | "CB Saves the Planet" | Eric Dean Seaton | Peter Dirksen & Jonathan Howard | April 22, 2020 | 220 | 3.02 |
Mellor tells CB that his immature hobbies are turning off potential girlfriends, so CB tries to act more grown-up upon being smitten with Paloma (Chloe Bridges), a woman Glascott brought in to help William Penn be more eco-friendly. However, when Paloma wants to save an endangered bird population that lives right where Mellor plans to build the new baseball stadium, CB has to reach into his old bag of tricks. Meanwhile, Wilma tries to convince Lainey, head of the yearbook committee, to end the "senior superlatives" tradition because the awards are often hurtful. But Wilma reverses her stance upon learning that she's been voted "Coolest Teacher". Featured Songs: "In the Meantime" by Spacehog, "Fly Away" by Hardknox
| 34 | 22 | "Clueless" | Andrew Secunda | Tom Hertz | May 13, 2020 | 222 | 3.21 |
In the series finale, With Lainey having broken up with Barry over the long distance relationship not working, Wilma encourages her to confront her feelings for CB, but CB is now in a budding relationship with Paloma. When Paloma tells Lainey and Wilma she's considering a summer assignment in Brazil, Lainey encourages her to follow her dreams, even if it means leaving CB behind. Lainey later realizes she does have feelings for CB that go beyond friendship, only to learn he wants to travel with Paloma. At prom, Lainey asks CB not to go to Brazil, and when he asks why, she kisses him. Meanwhile, Toby is overjoyed when Dawn, a popular senior, asks him to prom. However, Mellor and Glascott later find out that Dawn only asked Toby because her parents will approve of him, and she intends to ditch him at prom for her real boyfriend, who's a known troublemaker. Mellor then tries to figure out how to tell Toby without hurting him too much. Featured Song: "Dreams" by The Cranberries Note: This is the final episode of the series.

== Production ==
=== Original concept ===
In November 2016, it was first reported that ABC was developing a spin-off that would center around recurring character Rick Mellor, played by Bryan Callen. On January 10, 2017, Wendi McClendon-Covey's character was reported as appearing in the script in a guest appearance. The script was ordered to pilot on February 2, 2017.

On March 16, 2017, it was confirmed that Nia Long had been cast as the female lead in the role of Lucy Winston. At the same time it was confirmed that Tim Meadows would reprise his recurring role from The Goldbergs as Andre Glascott. Jay Chandrasekhar was also confirmed to direct.

On May 17, 2017, ABC passed on the spin-off, despite it reportedly testing very well - going as far to test better than the pilot of the original series. At the same time, Adam F. Goldberg revealed the title of the failed spin-off - "Schooled".

On January 8, 2018, it was announced that the pilot would air as a special episode of The Goldbergs on January 24, 2018, under the episode title "The Goldbergs: 1990-Something". Along with Nia Long as Lucy Winston and Tim Meadows as teacher-turned-principal Andre Glascott (who is also revealed to be Lucy's brother), the pilot also starred Rachel Crow as Lucy's rebellious teenage daughter Felicia, and Summer Parker as Felicia's bubbly younger sister Gigi, with Octavia Spencer narrating as the present-day Felicia.

=== Development ===
After the pilot aired, Goldberg had expressed hope that the airing would prompt discussions with ABC that could lead to the series being picked up for the 2018–19 TV season. Three months later, on April 16, 2018, it was announced that ABC had officially picked up the spin-off, Schooled, for a 13-episode season slated to air in 2019. It was also announced that AJ Michalka would reprise her role as Lainey Lewis from The Goldbergs in the new show, but Nia Long will not return to the spin-off due to being a regular cast member on the CBS drama series NCIS: Los Angeles. Rachel Crow's Felicia is the only new character from the original pilot to appear in the series, albeit in a reduced recurring capacity.

On October 3, 2018, it was announced by Deadline that Jane the Virgin actor Brett Dier would have a series regular role as C.B., a teacher who is both a friend and rival to rookie teacher Lainey Lewis. C.B. is also based on Adam Goldberg's favorite teacher and friend.

On November 28, 2018, it was revealed that the series would premiere on January 9, 2019.

On May 11, 2019, the series was renewed for a second season. For season 2, Kali Hawk was cast in the new role of biology teacher Wilma Howell, but Hawk was later replaced by Haneefah Wood.

In March 2020, production on the series was halted due to the COVID-19 pandemic. The episode that was in production at the time was planned to air as the 21st episode of the second season, which would have covered the breakup of Barry and Lainey. The episode that eventually aired as the 21st episode, but was planned to air as the 22nd episode, had been filmed prior as a result of working around Troy Gentile's schedule with filming The Goldbergs – which was also still in production at the time. Despite not being able to complete the intended 21st episode, the completed following episode still aired as the second-season finale, with details of the breakup being provided via narration by AJ Michalka (in character as Lainey) on top of previously filmed stock footage of the characters. On May 21, 2020, ABC canceled the series after two seasons.

== Reception ==
=== Critical response ===
The series holds an approval rating of 73% based on 11 reviews, with an average rating of 5.92/10 on Rotten Tomatoes. The website's critical consensus reads, "Schooled's freshman outing struggles to differentiate itself from its predecessor—though its sweetly silly sensibilities and stellar cast may be enough for viewers looking for a good-natured sitcom." Metacritic, which uses a weighted average, assigned the series a score of 56 out of 100 based on 7 critics.

=== Ratings ===
Viewership and ratings per season of Schooled
| Season | Timeslot (ET) | Episodes | First aired | | Last aired | | TV season | Viewership rank | Avg. viewers (millions) | Avg. 18–49 rating |
| Season | Timeslot (ET) | Episodes | Date | Viewers (millions) | Date | Viewers (millions) | TV season | Viewership rank | Avg. viewers (millions) | Avg. 18–49 rating |
|---|---|---|---|---|---|---|---|---|---|---|
| 1 | Wednesday 8:30 p.m. | 12 | January 9, 2019 | 4.82 | May 1, 2019 | 3.67 | 2018–19 | 103 | 4.45 | 1.2 |
| 2 | Wednesday 8:30 p.m. | 22 | September 18, 2019 | 1.99 | May 13, 2020 | 3.21 | 2019–20 | 84 | 3.93 | 0.9 |

==== Season 1 ====
Viewership and ratings per episode of Schooled
| No. | Title | Air date | Rating/share (18–49) | Viewers (millions) | DVR (18–49) | DVR viewers (millions) | Total (18–49) | Total viewers (millions) |
|---|---|---|---|---|---|---|---|---|
| 1 | "Be Like Mike" | January 9, 2019 | 1.3/6 | 4.82 | 0.6 | 1.57 | 1.9 | 6.40 |
| 2 | "Lainey's All That" | January 16, 2019 | 1.1/5 | 4.05 | 0.5 | —N/a | 1.6 | —N/a |
| 3 | "Tamagotchis and Bells" | January 23, 2019 | 1.1/5 | 4.42 | 0.5 | —N/a | 1.6 | —N/a |
| 4 | "I, Mellor" | January 30, 2019 | 1.0/4 | 4.54 | 0.4 | 1.13 | 1.4 | 5.67 |
| 5 | "Money for RENT" | February 13, 2019 | 0.8/4 | 3.73 | 0.4 | 1.16 | 1.3 | 4.90 |
| 6 | "Rock for Jocks" | February 20, 2019 | 0.9/4 | 3.80 | 0.3 | 1.01 | 1.2 | 4.81 |
| 7 | "Kris Kross" | February 27, 2019 | 0.9/4 | 3.52 | 0.4 | 1.11 | 1.3 | 4.64 |
| 8 | "Lainey and Erica's High School Reunion" | March 13, 2019 | 1.0/5 | 3.92 | 0.3 | 1.05 | 1.3 | 4.97 |
| 9 | "Darth Mellor" | March 20, 2019 | 0.9/4 | 3.61 | 0.4 | 1.08 | 1.3 | 4.69 |
| 10 | "There's No Fighting in Fight Club" | April 3, 2019 | 0.8/4 | 3.40 | 0.3 | 0.90 | 1.1 | 4.30 |
| 11 | "Glascott Mascot" | April 10, 2019 | 1.0/5 | 3.82 | 0.2 | 0.91 | 1.2 | 4.73 |
| 12 | "CB Likes Lainey" | May 1, 2019 | 0.8/4 | 3.67 | —N/a | —N/a | —N/a | —N/a |

==== Season 2 ====
Viewership and ratings per episode of Schooled
| No. | Title | Air date | Rating/share (18–49) | Viewers (millions) | DVR (18–49) | DVR viewers (millions) | Total (18–49) | Total viewers (millions) |
|---|---|---|---|---|---|---|---|---|
| 1 | "Dr. Barry" | September 18, 2019 | —N/a | 1.99 | 0.3 | 0.92 | 1.2 | —N/a |
| 2 | "Dangerous Minds" | September 25, 2019 | 0.8/4 | 3.41 | 0.3 | 1.05 | 1.1 | 4.48 |
| 3 | "I'll Be There For You" | October 2, 2019 | 0.8/4 | 3.33 | 0.3 | 0.85 | 1.1 | 4.18 |
| 4 | "The Rudy-ing of Toby Murphy" | October 9, 2019 | 0.7/4 | 3.30 | 0.3 | 0.79 | 1.0 | 4.09 |
| 5 | "Kick Like a Girl" | October 16, 2019 | 0.8/4 | 3.36 | 0.2 | 0.70 | 1.0 | 4.06 |
| 6 | "Outbreak" | October 23, 2919 | 0.7/4 | 3.10 | 0.3 | 0.74 | 1.0 | 3.84 |
| 7 | "Run, Rick, Run" | October 30, 2019 | 0.7/3 | 3.10 | 0.3 | 0.81 | 1.0 | 3.91 |
| 8 | "Hakuna Matata" | November 6, 2019 | 0.7/4 | 3.19 | 0.3 | 0.80 | 1.0 | 3.99 |
| 9 | "Friendsgiving" | November 20, 2019 | 0.7/3 | 3.19 | 0.3 | 0.86 | 1.0 | 4.02 |
| 10 | "The Pokémon Society" | December 4, 2019 | 0.6/3 | 3.14 | 0.3 | 0.79 | 0.9 | 3.93 |
| 11 | "Beanie Babies" | December 11, 2019 | 0.6/3 | 3.01 | —N/a | 0.79 | —N/a | 3.80 |
| 12 | "Boy Bands" | January 15, 2020 | 0.6/3 | 2.86 | 0.1 | 0.38 | 0.7 | 3.24 |
| 13 | "FeMellor" | January 22, 2020 | 0.7/4 | 3.01 | 0.2 | 0.79 | 0.9 | 3.80 |
| 14 | "Titanic Love" | January 29, 2020 | 0.7/3 | 2.89 | 0.2 | 0.71 | 0.9 | 3.61 |
| 15 | "Singled Out" | February 12, 2020 | 0.7 | 2.91 | 0.2 | 0.78 | 0.9 | 3.69 |
| 16 | "Moving On" | February 19, 2020 | 0.6 | 2.93 | 0.3 | 0.90 | 0.9 | 3.84 |
| 17 | "Rock Star" | March 18, 2020 | 0.8 | 3.39 | 0.3 | 0.86 | 1.1 | 4.25 |
| 18 | "Garden Party" | March 25, 2020 | 0.6 | 3.20 | 0.3 | 0.75 | 0.9 | 3.96 |
| 19 | "Lainey's Mom" | April 1, 2020 | 0.6 | 3.23 | 0.3 | 0.79 | 0.9 | 4.02 |
| 20 | "Principal for a Day" | April 15, 2020 | 0.7 | 3.28 | 0.2 | 0.76 | 0.9 | 4.04 |
| 21 | "CB Saves the Planet" | April 22, 2020 | 0.6 | 3.02 | TBD | TBD | TBD | TBD |
| 22 | "Clueless" | May 13, 2020 | 0.7 | 3.21 | TBD | TBD | TBD | TBD |
