= Grease Live! =

2016 American television special of the 1971 musical of the same name

- Promotional poster
- Genre: Musical; Romantic comedy Live television
- Based on: Grease (musical); Grease (film)
- Written by: Robert Cary; Jonathan Tolins
- Directed by: Thomas Kail; Alex Rudzinski
- Presented by: Mario Lopez
- Starring: Julianne Hough; Aaron Tveit; Vanessa Hudgens; Keke Palmer; Carly Rae Jepsen; Mario Lopez; Carlos PenaVega; Kether Donohue; Jordan Fisher; David Del Rio; Elle McLemore; Andrew Call; Wendell Pierce
- Country of origin: United States
- Original language: English

Production
- Executive producer: Marc Platt
- Producers: Greg Sills; Adam Siegel; Kenneth Ferrone (Note: Credited as Co-Producer); Zach Woodlee
- Production locations: Warner Bros., Burbank, California
- Running time: 130 minutes
- Production companies: Paramount Television; Marc Platt Productions
- Budget: US$16 million

Original release
- Network: Fox
- Release: January 31, 2016

Grease Live! is an American television special that was originally broadcast by Fox on January 31, 2016. It is a live televised remake of the 1978 film of the same name, executive produced by Marc Platt, written by Robert Cary and Jonathan Tolins, directed by Thomas Kail and Alex Rudzinski, and starring Julianne Hough, Aaron Tveit, Vanessa Hudgens and Carlos PenaVega.

Patterned on similar live television musicals recently produced by NBC, the production incorporated elements and songs from both the original stage musical and the 1978 film version of Grease, as well as additional songs that were not present in either. In an effort to emulate the "energy" of a theatrical setting, live audiences were incorporated into the production's stagings. Grease Live was broadcast from Warner Bros. Studios, utilizing two soundstages and the studio's outdoor backlot—the usage of the latter was notably affected by rain in the Los Angeles area on the day of the broadcast.

Critical reception was positive, with particular praise to the overall atmosphere and production style of the presentation, as well as the performances of the cast, particularly Hudgens as Betty Rizzo—the special was dedicated in the memory of Hudgens' father Greg, who had died from cancer one day before the broadcast. The special was nominated for ten Primetime Emmy Awards and won a total of five, including Outstanding Special Class Program.

== History ==
=== Announcement and casting ===
On April 28, 2014, Fox announced that it had partnered with Paramount Television to produce a live, three-hour televised adaptation of the 1978 musical Grease in 2015. The move came in the wake of similar live musical adaptations that had been produced by NBC, such as The Sound of Music Live! and Peter Pan Live!.

On January 17, 2015, Fox officially announced that Julianne Hough had been cast as Sandy and Vanessa Hudgens as Rizzo and that the special would air on January 31, 2016. Entertainment Weekly reported that the special had been delayed from its original target of Summer 2015 due to difficulties in the casting process. On May 28, 2015, it was announced that Keke Palmer would join the broadcast as Marty Maraschino, one of the Pink Ladies. On July 9, it was announced that Aaron Tveit would star as Danny Zuko in the live TV broadcast, and Carlos PenaVega would play the role of Kenickie. On September 30, 2015, it was announced that Carly Rae Jepsen, Kether Donohue, and David Del Rio would play Frenchy, Jan, and Putzie, respectively. On November 6, it was announced that Jordan Fisher, Andrew Call and Yvette Gonzalez-Nacer would join the cast as Doody, Sonny and Cha-Cha, respectively.

=== Production ===
Director Thomas Kail envisioned Grease Live as being a "combination" of elements from the original musical and the 1978 film version of Grease. For instance, the production incorporated songs that were created for the film version, such as a performance of its theme song "Grease (Is The Word)" by Jessie J, "You're the One That I Want", and "Hopelessly Devoted to You", as well as songs that were exclusive to the stage version, such as "Freddy, My Love" and "Those Magic Changes". Kail explained that "very early on as I started imagining what this could be, talking to Marc Platt, our executive producer, and the folks at Paramount, one of the things we really were very focused on was trying to capture the spirit of both the original companies of Grease and that film that has left such an indelible impression on all of us. To try to honor that and pay homage to something that has moved us and we have such a great affection for, and then try to make our own version of it."

The production also contained several new songs including the original, "All I Need Is an Angel", which was written for the character of Frenchy (Carly Rae Jepsen) by Tom Kitt and Brian Yorkey of Next to Normal fame. Joe Jonas's band DNCE made a cameo appearance as Johnny Casino and The Gamblers during the Rydell High dance where they performed The Crickets' "Maybe Baby", as well as a 1950s-inspired remix of their own debut single "Cake by the Ocean" in addition to "Born to Hand Jive" from the stage version and "Rock and Roll Is Here to Stay" which was previously only part of the film version. In an interview with Rolling Stone, Jonas explained that the band was approached by the producers for the role following a concert they had performed in New York City.

Grease Live was broadcast from Warner Bros. in Burbank, California, using two soundstages, half of its backlot, and 44 cameras. Set designer David Korins explained that the medium of a live, television musical would "really show off what theater does best, and also what film and television does best", having constructed a self-contained "cafegymatorium" set that is designed to provide an "immersive", 360-degree experience, as well as traditional theatrical-style stagings. Grease Live was presented to live studio audiences at each of the three filming locations, who were also directly integrated into relevant scenes as extras on-stage, such as in crowds. Kail explained that he wanted to capture the "feeling" of the audiences at live stage productions, as there was "an energy and an undeniable vitality that real humans give back to real humans that are performing". The Hollywood Reporter believed that the use of live audiences would help to stylistically distinguish Grease Live from the NBC live musicals that it was patterned after.

The price of a 30-second commercial during Grease Live was set between $300,000 and $320,000. Coca-Cola was signed on as a major sponsor of the special; the sponsorship included product placement of classic Coca-Cola signage and beverages within the special (such as on a vending machine and on the diner set), and sponsored social media content. In order to be appropriate for broadcast television and to appease advertisers, several songs were edited for content; Platt stated that his goal was to make Grease Live a "family-friendly" show, but still wanted to maintain "the appropriate edge" the musical required. Among the edits, "Greased Lightnin'" changed the lyrics to remove several profane and sexual words (edits that original songwriter Jim Jacobs had made to the officially licensed versions many years prior), while the Italian profanity "fongool" was replaced with "be cool" within "Look At Me, I'm Sandra Dee".

==== Weather issues ====
The use of outdoor sets for portions of the production led to concerns that it could be affected by weather, especially in the wake of forecasts calling for a 100% chance of precipitation and possible thunderstorms on the day of the telecast. Kail stated that the production did have contingency plans in the event of rain, while Platt stated that his team had factored the possibility of rain into its plans for "many months", and that while safety was the highest priority, the show would still go on, rain or shine.

While prepared for the possibility of rain, wind was also a major factor: at around 3:00 p.m. PT, an hour before the telecast went live, Platt was informed that a particular structure on the outdoor set could not be used for safety reasons. By 3:40 p.m. PT, while the team was in the process of re-staging the opening number to exclude the structure, the rain and wind passed, and engineers cleared the use of the structure—allowing a return to the original staging. The broadcast would ultimately feature references to the conditions: emcee Mario Lopez jokingly introduced "El Niño" as being a "special guest", while the opening number, "Grease (Is the Word)", was performed with the cast holding umbrellas, and during a discussion about having a live broadcast at Rydell High, Principal McGee (Ana Gasteyer) quipped, "Let's just hope it doesn't rain."

==== Death of Greg Hudgens ====
On the day of the broadcast, Vanessa Hudgens announced on Twitter that her father, Greg, had died of cancer the night before, and that she would dedicate her performance in Grease Live to his memory. Platt told Entertainment Weekly that he was "fiercely proud" of Hudgens' handling of the situation, describing her as a "very determined young woman" who "knows that the show has to go on, as any actor of the theater or in a live event knows. So she decided she would take her feelings of loss and sadness and put them in a box for that afternoon, that she would use them to fuel her performance and she would do it in honor of her father." Additionally, Fox and Paramount allowed the production to be dedicated in memory of Greg; Platt went on to say that "the cast was behind her and we all joined hands and said, 'We're going to live in this moment. Sometimes life interferes. But you have all worked so hard for this moment and we're going to go for it.'"

== Cast and characters ==
=== Main cast ===
- Aaron Tveit as Danny Zuko, Sandy's boyfriend, leader of T'Birds, Rydell High's Greaser gang
- Julianne Hough as Sandy Young, Danny's girlfriend, relocated from Utah (this, her conservative values and sharing a name with Brigham Young imply a Mormon upbringing, much like Hough's own. In the film version, Grease, Sandy’s last name was Olsson, and had relocated from Australia in order to suit the original actress Olivia Newton-John), who transforms from square lady to female greaser over the course of the production
- Vanessa Hudgens as Betty Rizzo, leader of the Pink Ladies, archenemy of Sandy
- Carlos PenaVega as Kenickie, member of T'Birds, owner of the car Greased Lightnin', Danny's best friend and Rizzo's on-again/off-again fling

=== Pink Ladies ===
- Carly Rae Jepsen as "Frenchy" , Sandy's best friend, aspiring beautician
- Keke Palmer as "Marty" Maraschino, the Pink Ladies' resident sex kitten
- Kether Donohue as "Jan" , blunt and somewhat dorky

=== T-Birds ===
- Jordan Fisher as "Doody"
- Andrew Call as Sonny LaTierri,
- David Del Rio as "Putzie"

=== Special guests ===
- Didi Conn as Vi (Conn played Frenchy in the 1978 film)
- Barry Pearl as Mr. Stan Weaver (Pearl played Doody in the 1978 film)

=== Musical guests ===
- Jessie J as the title song singer
- Boyz II Men as the Teen Angels
- DNCE as Johnny Casino and the Gamblers

=== Other characters ===
- Mario Lopez as Vince Fontaine
- Ana Gasteyer as Principal McGee
- Elle McLemore as Patty Simcox
- Wendell Pierce as Coach Calhoun
- Eve Plumb as Mrs. Murdock
- Sam Clark as " Balmudo
- Yvette González-Nacer as "Cha-Cha" DiGregorio
- Noah Robbins as Eugene Felsnick
- Jon Robert Hall as "Tom" Chisum
- Haneefah Wood as Blanche Hodel

=== Ensemble ===
- Carly Bracco
- Gregory Haney
- Harley Jay
- Chris Meissner
- Tiana Okoye
- Kayla Parker
- Dominic Pierson
- Cailan Rose

== Personnel ==
=== Musicians ===
- Tom Kitt – conductor, keyboards
- Brian Kilgore – percussion
- Dave Kendrick – lead guitar
- John Wilson – rhythm guitar
- Taylor Hale – bass
- Chad Timon – drums
- Isaiah Miller – piano, keyboards
- Lindsey Stirling, David Garrett – violins
- Laura Freeman – viola
- Joshua Alexander Sykes – cello
- Nick Payton, Kail Graham – trumpets
- Lil' Joey – trombone
- Ray Hanson, Kirk Sanborn – saxophones, flutes
- Arnold McCuller, Dorian Holley, Fred White, Emily Stevens, Kathy Gray, Siedah Garrett – vocals
- Bob Garrett – vocal director

=== Dancers ===
- Nick Baga
- Karen Chuang
- Janaya French
- Courtney Galiano
- Marko Germar
- Jeremy Hudson
- KC Monnie
- Haylee Roderick
- Brooke Shepherd
- Ade Chike Torbert

== Soundtrack ==
The official soundtrack album, Grease Live! (Music from the Television Event), was released on January 31 by Paramount Pictures. The Target edition, including four bonus tracks, was released on February 27. In the show, 23 songs were performed, but only 19 were included in the official soundtrack. "Alma Mater" (performed by Ana Gasteyer and Haneefah Wood) and "Mooning" (performed by DNCE) were not included in any version of the album. The album debuted at number 37 on the US Billboard 200, and topped the same week on the Top Album Sales chart.

== Reception ==
=== Critical reception ===
Grease Live received mostly positive reviews. Review aggregator Rotten Tomatoes listed the special with a 91% rating based on 34 reviews, and an average rating of 8.3/10. The website's critical consensus states that "Grease: Live took the pressure and threw away conventionality — it belongs to yesterday. There was a chance that it could make it so far; we started believin' we can be who we are. Grease: Live is the word." Metacritic listed a weighted average of 75 out of 100 based on 23 critics, indicating "generally favorable" reviews.

Megan Vick of TV Guide felt that Kail had "upped the standard" for live television musicals, and had "successfully managed to combine all the nostalgic elements of Grease that everyone expected while creating a new experience. The set changes and scale of what they were able to accomplish—in a rainstorm no less—were incredibly impressive. Grease is the word, and ratings most likely will be too." While praising "All I Need Is an Angel" for demonstrating Carly Rae Jepsen's capabilities as a singer, Vick felt that the song was too modern for a musical that is set in the 1950s.

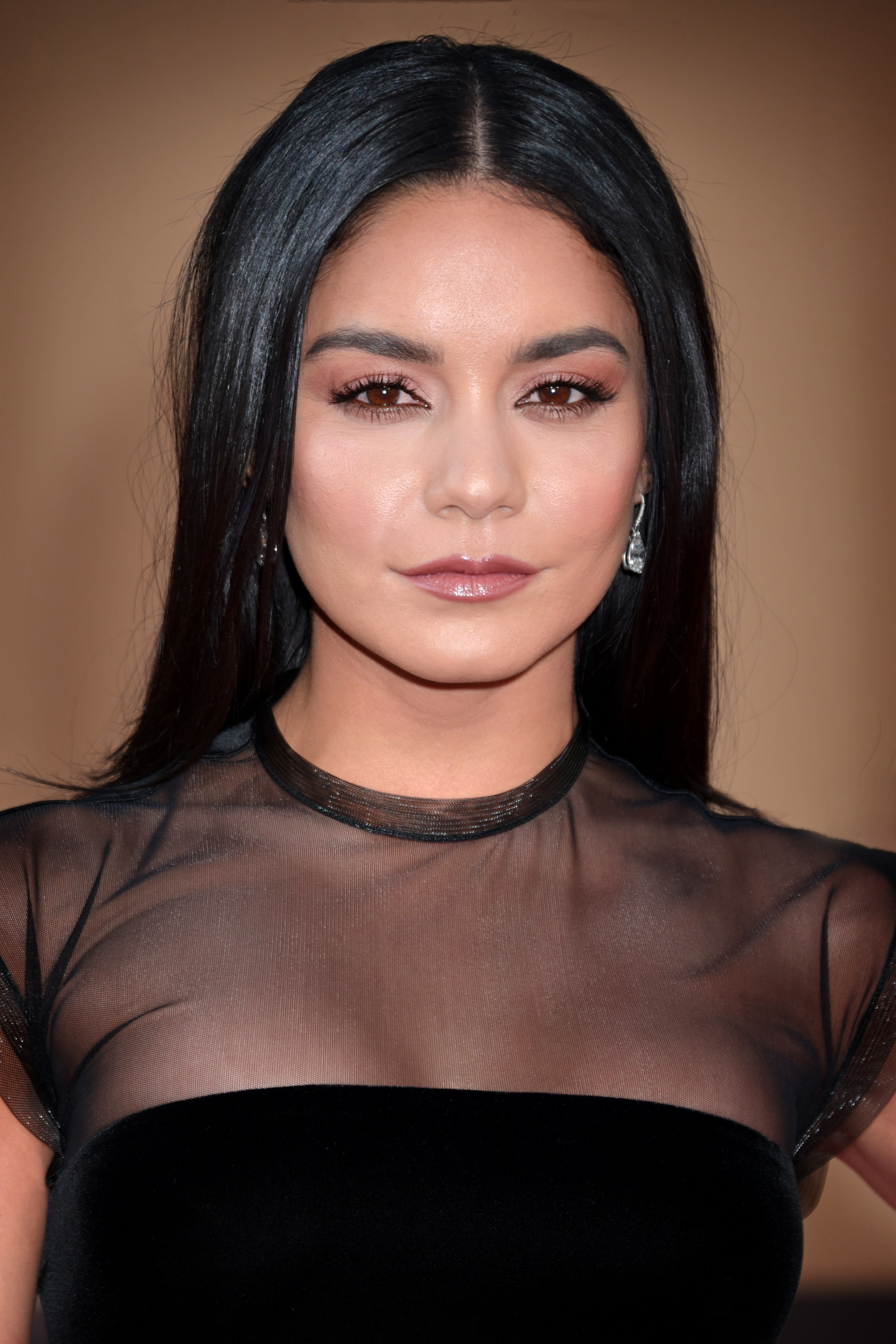
Vanessa Hudgens received widespread acclaim for her performance and professionalism as her father had died the day before the live show.

Jeremy Gerald of Deadline Hollywood noted that Grease Live was broadcast "with nary a hitch and one last-minute change in the out-of-doors opening number that paid tribute to the greatest movie musical of all time, Singin' in the Rain". Acknowledging that none of NBC's live musicals had "hit the stratospheric highs of this show", while aspects of the production were also praised, such as the live audiences and stage design. Vanessa Hudgens was judged to have "stolen" the show, and that Aaron Tveit and Julianne Hough "couldn't be better matched as the head of the T Birds and the sweet new girl from Utah." In conclusion, Gerald felt that he had "never seen a more inventive interplay between a show and just enough of the mechanics of the deal to make it all the more engaging. That, and the audience that played its essential part in moving Grease Live along with enthusiastic applause replacing the dead air that followed key moments in the earlier live broadcasts, set a new standard for this kind of presentation that will be tough to top."

Variety's Maureen Ryan felt that the performance of Hough and Tveit was weak, explaining that "when Danny has all the presence of a glass of milk and even the black-clad Sandy of the final scenes exudes all the sexual danger of a church choir director, well, rest assured that those concerned about the Grease legacies of Travolta and Olivia Newton-John have nothing to worry about." Despite this and other shortcomings, such as audio issues during "Hopelessly Devoted to You", and the "surreality" of the audience's presence in certain scenes, Ryan felt Grease Live got "most of the big things right", and that "by incorporating a live audience, using creative staging and employing energetic camera work", the production "boasted an impressive sense of momentum and even spontaneity." Of the individual performances, Ryan praised Keke Palmer's, Hudgens', and Carly Rae Jepsen's vocal performances, Elle McLemore's "simply terrific" Patty, Kether Donahue's "infectious joy", and Ana Gasteyer's "beautifully droll timing" as Principal McGee. She concluded that "If Fox can get the lead casting right in future and snag Kail again, audiences will surely be hopelessly devoted to the network's next live endeavor." Writing in USA Today, Robert Bianco noted various positive and negative aspects of the broadcast. While he praised performances by the supporting cast, he lamented "the progressive dumbing-down of the material. A Broadway musical that originally spoofed our rose-tinted-glasses view of the '50s has turned into a nostalgic wallow, leaving the show with an odd mix of tones – and in this particular version, a book that sometimes seemed to get lost between songs and inside jokes. ... it was often so flatly acted" that the "kinetic", "visually impressive" musical numbers came as a "much-needed relief". Nevertheless, he felt that the production "sprang to life at the end."

=== Ratings ===
Grease Live was seen by 12.18 million viewers, with a 4.3/13 share in the 18–49 demographic, making it the most-watched program of the night. The special brought Fox its best ratings of the 2015–16 television season since the second season premiere of Empire in September 2015, which was seen by 16.18 million viewers. The overall and demographic ratings also beat NBC's December 2015 presentation of The Wiz Live!, with 6% higher viewership overall, and 30% higher 18-49 ratings. While both competed against NFL games, The Wiz competed against a regular-season Thursday Night Football game on CBS, and Grease against the Pro Bowl on ESPN. Over 1.2 million Twitter posts were made throughout the airing, with most providing condolences for Hudgens' father. An encore of Grease Live on March 27, 2016, Easter Sunday, was seen by 1.54 million viewers.

TiVo Inc. estimated that Hudgens' solo of "There Are Worse Things I Could Do" was the most replayed scene of the special.

=== Accolades ===
Award	Category	Recipient	Result
68th Primetime Creative Arts Emmy Awards	Outstanding Special Class Program	Marc Platt, Thomas Kail, Alex Rudzinski, Adam Siegel, and Greg Sills	Won
68th Primetime Creative Arts Emmy Awards	Outstanding Casting for a Limited Series, Movie, or Special	Bernard Telsey, Tiffany Little Canfield and Justin Huff	Nominated
68th Primetime Creative Arts Emmy Awards	Outstanding Costumes for a Variety, Nonfiction, or Reality Program	William Ivey Long, Paul Spadone, Nanrose Buchman, Gail Fitzgibbons, and Tom Beall	Nominated
68th Primetime Creative Arts Emmy Awards	Outstanding Hairstyling for a Multi-Camera Series or Special	Mary Guerrero, Kimi Messina, Gail Ryan, Jennifer Guerrero, Dean Banowetz, and Lucia Mace	Nominated
68th Primetime Creative Arts Emmy Awards	Outstanding Makeup for a Multi-Camera Series or Special	Zena Shteysel, Angela Moos, Julie Socash, and Alison Gladieux	Nominated
68th Primetime Creative Arts Emmy Awards	Outstanding Production Design for a Variety, Nonfiction, Event, or Award Special	David Korins, Joe Celli, and Jason Howard	Won
68th Primetime Creative Arts Emmy Awards	Outstanding Lighting Design/Lighting Direction for a Variety Special	Al Gurdon, Travis Hagenbuch, Madigan Stehly, Will Gossett, and Ryan Tanker	Won
68th Primetime Creative Arts Emmy Awards	Outstanding Sound Mixing for a Variety Series or Special	Biff Dawes, Eric Johnston, Bob La Masney, Pablo Munguia, Kevin Wapner, John Protzko, John Garlick, and Barrance D. Warrick	Nominated
68th Primetime Creative Arts Emmy Awards	Outstanding Technical Direction, Camerawork, Video Control for a Limited Series, Movie, or Special	Eric Becker, Bert Atkinson, Keith Dicker, Randy Gomez Sr., Nat Havholm, Ron Lehman, Dave Levisohn, Tore Livia, Mike Malone, Adam Margolis, Rob Palmer, Brian Reason, Damien Tuffereau, Easter Xua, Chris Hill, and Matt Pascale	Won
68th Primetime Emmy Awards	Outstanding Directing for a Variety Special	Thomas Kail and Alex Rudzinski	Won
2017 MTV Movie & TV Awards	Best Musical Moment	"You're the One That I Want", Ensemble	Won

== International broadcasts ==
In Canada, Grease Live was aired by CTV, in simulcast with the Fox broadcast. The special aired on February 2 in Australia (Nine Network), February 3 in the United Kingdom (ITV2), February 5 in New Zealand (TV3), February 7 in Norway (FEM), February 20 in Denmark (TV2 Fri), and in Italy August 21 (dubbed) (Rai 4). In Latin America, it was broadcast by FOX Family on April 24, 2016, (dubbed). It was broadcast in Sweden by the public service network (SVT1) on June 12, 2016. It was broadcast in The Netherlands by RTL 8 on July 22, 2016. In Singapore, it was broadcast on Mediacorp Channel 5 on Christmas night, December 25, 2016. In France, it was broadcast on 6ter on December 26, 2016.

== Home media ==
Grease Live was released on DVD and Digital HD, on March 8, 2016. It was included in the 40th anniversary collection Blu-ray alongside Grease and Grease 2, which was released on April 24, 2018.

== See also ==
- 2016 in American television
