= Hello Tomorrow! =

American television series

- Promotional poster
- Genre: Comedy-drama; Science fiction
- Created by: Amit Bhalla; Lucas Jansen
- Starring: Billy Crudup; Hank Azaria; Haneefah Wood; Alison Pill; Nicholas Podany; Dewshane Williams
- Theme music composer: Mark Mothersbaugh
- Composer: Mark Mothersbaugh
- Country of origin: United States
- Original language: English
- No. of seasons: 1
- No. of episodes: 10

Production
- Executive producers: Billy Crudup; Jonathan Entwistle; Stephen Falk; Blake Griffin; Ryan Kalil; Noah Weinstein; Amit Bhalla; Lucas Jansen
- Cinematography: Tim Norman; Christopher Norr; Justin Brown
- Running time: 30–33 minutes
- Production companies: Mortal Media; Froward Enterprise; Ceremony Pictures; Hooptie Filmed Entertainment; MRC Television; Apple Studios

Original release
- Network: Apple TV+
- Release: February 17 – April 7, 2023

Hello Tomorrow! is an American science fiction comedy-drama television series that premiered on Apple TV+ on February 17, 2023. It stars Billy Crudup.

== Plot ==
In a retrofuturistic world, a huckster named Jack Billings runs a small business of traveling salesmen who go door to door (on Earth) selling timeshares on the moon. Jack pays his staff with the payments, pockets the rest, and then moves on from town to town, with the fictional rocket launch for his customers to be brought to their fictional new homes being delayed further and further.

In one of the towns Jack realizes he's found his son Joey, who doesn't know that Jack is his father. Jack hires Joey as a salesperson, decides to stay in this town for a while, and tries to find a way to tell Joey that they are father and son without driving him away, while also trying to keep the fraudulent business from crashing down around him.

== Cast ==
=== Main ===
- Billy Crudup as Jack Billings: a lunar-timeshare salesman with Brightside Lunar Residencies and chronic con man; abandoned his wife, Marie Shorter, and their son, Joey, some eighteen years ago.
- Hank Azaria as Eddie Nichols: another salesman with a gambling addiction that put him in debt to the mob; is trying to convince Shirley to elope to the moon with him.
- Haneefah Wood as Shirley Stedman: a sort of business manager for the sales office, she's tasked with handling most of the money and paperwork for the office.
- Alison Pill as Myrtle Mayburn: an unstable woman who becomes increasingly unhinged as her promised life on the moon becomes ever more delayed.
- Nicholas Podany as Joey Shorter: an upstart salesman who becomes Jack's protege; unaware that Jack is actually his father.
- Dewshane Williams as Herb Porter: the last member of the sales team; his cool demeanor covers his willingness to lie and manipulate in order to make a sale.

=== Recurring ===
- Jacki Weaver as Barbara Billings: Jack's mother who wants to be reunited with Joey.
- Dagmara Domińczyk as Elle Sellway: a wealthy woman of dubious morals; interested in "investing" in Brightside Lunar Residencies.
- Michael Paul Chan as Walt: owns a derelict lot which Jack Billings directs people to as a "launch site"
- Joel Marsh Garland as Hank Mason: a poor former janitor who lost his job saving Jack's life; Jack has "given" him an A-Plex on the moon.
- Matthew Maher as Lester Costopolous: a regulatory officer investigating the Brightside Lunar Residencies.
- Susan Heyward as Betty Porter: Herb's high-strung wife; supposedly pregnant with twins.

=== Guest ===
- Michael Harney as Sal
- Frankie Faison as Buck Manzell: a celebrity famous for his role as "Space Sheriff"; currently working as a spokesperson for the Brightside Lunar Residencies.
- W. Earl Brown as Big Fred
- Gabriel Ebert as Marvin Mayburn

== Episodes ==
No.	Title	Directed by	Written by	Original release date
1	"Your Brighter Tomorrow, Today"	Jonathan Entwistle	Amit Bhalla & Lucas Jansen	February 17, 2023
2	"Great Salesmen Make Their Own Turf"	Jonathan Entwistle	Amit Bhalla & Lucas Jansen	February 17, 2023
3	"A Traveling Salesman Travels"	Jonathan Entwistle	Olivia Milch	February 17, 2023
4	"Forms, Appropriately Filled and Filed"	Jonathan Entwistle	Wes Brown	February 24, 2023
5	"From the Desk of Stanley Jenkins"	Ryan McFaul	Jiehae Park	March 3, 2023
6	"The Numbers Behind the Numbers"	Ryan McFaul	Amit Bhalla & Lucas Jansen	March 10, 2023
7	"Another Day, Another Apocalypse"	Ryan McFaul	Stephen Falk	March 17, 2023
8	"The Gargon Mothership"	Ryan McFaul	Stephen Falk & Lucas Jansen	March 24, 2023
9	"Certain Forces Once Unleashed"	Stacie Passon	Jiehae Park	March 31, 2023
10	"What Could Be Better?"	Stacie Passon	Amit Bhalla & Lucas Jansen	April 7, 2023

== Production ==
On May 6, 2021, it was announced that Apple TV+ would produce Amit Bhalla's and Lucas Jansen's TV series Hello Tomorrow!, with Bhalla and Jansen co-writing and producing with Blake Griffin, Ryan Kalil, and Noah Weinstein's Mortal Media, Billy Crudup, and Jonathan Entwistle, with Entwistle set to direct the 10-episode series. Crudup would appear in the lead role.

On October 25, 2021, Hank Azaria, Haneefah Wood, Alison Pill, Nicholas Podany, and Dewshane Williams joined the cast, as did Jacki Weaver on November 17. On January 24, 2022, Dagmara Domińczyk received a recurring role.

Filming began in New York City on October 14, 2021, and concluded on March 24, 2022.

The series premiered on February 17, 2023 on Apple TV+.

== Reception ==
The review aggregation website Rotten Tomatoes reported a 54% approval rating based on 52 reviews, with an average rating of 6.10/10. The website's critical consensus states, "Hello Tomorrow! is visually striking enough to periodically distract from its rambling story and thinly sketched characters, but overall, this first season fails to live up to its potential." Metacritic, which uses a weighted average, assigned a score of 60 out of 100 based on 26 critics, indicating "Mixed or average reviews".
