= Haneefah Wood =

American actress

- Born: September 16, 1979 (age 47); Prince George's County, Maryland, US
- Occupation: Actress
- Years active: 2002–present

Haneefah Wood is an American actress. She is known for her role as Candace De La Brix on Nurse Jackie, Vickie/Rafik's Sister in Freedomland, Blanche on Grease Live!, and Wilma Howell on Schooled and The Goldbergs.

== Career ==
Wood made her debut in an episode of the TV show Strong Medicine. She played Raleena in the episode "The Philadelphia Chromosome". In 2005, she played Ellie Graham on the episode "Prisoner" of Law and Order: Criminal Intent.

In 2006, she played Vickie/Rafik's Sister in Freedomland. In 2011, she played Candace De La Brix on 2 episodes of Nurse Jackie. In 2012, Wood played Layla Mislap on an episode of NYC 22. In 2013 and 2014, she had guest roles on White Collar and The Millers, respectively.

In 2015, Wood had a starring role as Pearl in the short-lived Zoe Ever After. Also in 2015, she played Tanya on Life in Pieces. She was in Grease Live! (2016) playing Blanche. She also played a camp administrator on Crazy Ex-Girlfriend in that year.

From 2017-2020, she starred as Ivy in Baskets, Cydie Scoville in Truth be Told, Jill in One Day at a Time, and most notably, Wilma Howell in Schooled.

== Filmography ==
Film

Movie	Role	Year	Notes
Freedomland	Vickie/Rafik's Sister	2006	
Typecast	Haneefah	2014	Short film
Grease Live!	Blanche	2016	TV movie
Hook Man	Odessa	2015	Short film
Art Prison	Warden Parks	2018	TV movie

Television

Series	Role	Year(s)	Notes
Strong Medicine	Raleena	2002	Episode: "The Philadelphia Chromosone"
Law and Order: Criminal Intent	Ellie Graham	2005	Episode: "Prisoner"
Nurse Jackie	Candace De La Brix	2011	2 episodes
NYC 22	Layla Mislap	2012	Episode: "Schooled"
White Collar	Wanda	2013	Episode: "Empire City"
King Bachelor's Pad	Herself	2014	Episode: "Obamacare: Healthcare Livin'"
The Millers	Vicky	2014	Episode: "Movin' Out: Carol's Song"
The League	Teacher	2014	Episode: "Epi Sexy"
Life in Pieces	Tanya	2015	Episode: "Burn Vasectomy Milkshake Pong"
Crazy Ex-Girlfriend	Camp Administrator	2016	Episode: "I'm Back at Camp with Josh!"
Zoe Ever After	Pearl	2016	Main role
S.W.A.T	Norah	2017	Episode: "Homecoming"
Baskets	Ivy	2017–2019	5 episodes
Truth Be Told	Cydie Scoville	2019–2020	Main role
One Day at a Time	Jill	2017–2020	11 episodes
Schooled	Wilma Howell	2019–2020	Joined main cast in season 2
The Goldbergs	Professor Howell	2021	Episode: "Bevy's Big Murder Mystery Party"
Murderville	Chief Rhonda Jenkins-Seattle	2022	6 episodes
Hello Tomorrow!	Shirley Stedman	2023	10 episodes
Drag Me to Dinner	Herself / Judge	2023	Hulu original
St. Denis Medical	Megan	2025	Episode: "Anything to Push Zaluva"
