= Lambda Literary Award for Anthology =

Annual LGBT literary award

- Awarded for: Anthologies
- Sponsored by: Lambda Literary Foundation
- Date: Annual
- Website: lambdaliterary.org/awards/

The Lambda Literary Award for Anthology is an annual literary award, presented by the Lambda Literary Foundation, that awards "[c]ollections of fiction, nonfiction, and poetry" with LGBT content. The award has been included since the first Lambda Literary Award ceremony but has included different iterations (i.e., Anthology, Gay Anthology, Lesbian Anthology, LGBT Anthology, LGBT Anthology Fiction and Nonfiction, and LGBTQ Anthology, and LGBTQ Anthology Fiction and Nonfiction).

== Recipients ==
Year	Category	Editor(s)	Work	Result	Ref.
1990	Gay Anthology	Martin Duberman, et al.	Hidden from History	Winner	
1990	Gay Anthology	Charles Ludlam	Collected Plays of Charles Ludlam	Finalist	
1990	Gay Anthology	Michael Nava	Finale: Stories of Mystery	Finalist	
1990	Gay Anthology	John Preston	Personal Dispatches	Finalist	
1990	Gay Anthology	Christie Balka and Andy Rose	Twice Blessed	Finalist	
1990	Lesbian Anthology	Martin Duberman, et al.	Hidden From History	Winner (tie)	
1990	Lesbian Anthology	Tee Corinne	Intricate Passions	Winner (tie)	
1990	Lesbian Anthology	C. McEwen and S. O'Sullivan	Out the Other Side	Winner (tie)	
1990	Lesbian Anthology	Terry Woodrow	Lesbian Bedtime Stories	Finalist	
1990	Lesbian Anthology	Irene Zahava	Lesbian Love Stories	Finalist	
1991	Gay Anthology	George Stambolian	Men On Men 3	Winner	
1991	Gay Anthology	Robert Kus	Gay Men of Alcoholics Anonymous	Finalist	
1991	Gay Anthology	Robert Kus	Keys To Caring	Finalist	
1991	Gay Anthology	Franklin Abbott	Men and Intimacy	Finalist	
1991	Gay Anthology	Cassady, Smith and Stone	Triple Fiction	Finalist	
1991	Lesbian Anthology	Joan Nestle and Naomi Holoch	Women On Women	Winner	
1991	Lesbian Anthology	Terry Woodrow	Lesbian Bedtime Stores 2	Finalist	
1991	Lesbian Anthology	Jeffner Allen	Lesbian Philosophies and Cultures	Finalist	
1991	Lesbian Anthology	Karla Jay and Joanne Glasgow	Lesbian Texts and Contexts	Finalist	
1991	Lesbian Anthology	Irene Zahava	Speaking Four Ourselves	Finalist	
1992	Gay Anthology	Essex Hemphill	Brother to Brother: New Writings by Black Gay Men	Winner	
1992	Gay Anthology	Edmund White	Faber Book of Gay Short Fiction	Finalist	
1992	Gay Anthology	John Preston	Hometowns: Gay Men Write About Where They Belong	Finalist	
1992	Gay Anthology	Terry Wolverton and Robert Drake	Indivisible: New Short Fiction by West Coast Gay and Lesbian Writers	Finalist	
1992	Gay Anthology	Mark Thompson	Leatherfolk: Radical Sex, People, Politics and Practice	Finalist	
1992	Lesbian Anthology	Carla Trujillo	Chicana Lesbians: The Girls Our Mothers Warned Us About	Winner	
1992	Lesbian Anthology	Judith Barrington	An Intimate Wilderness: Lesbian Writers on Sexuality	Finalist	
1992	Lesbian Anthology	Loraine Hutchins and Lani Ka'ahumanu	Bi Any Other Name	Finalist	
1992	Lesbian Anthology	Terry Wolverton and Robert Drake	Indivisible: New Short Fiction by West Coast Gay and Lesbian Writers	Finalist	
1992	Lesbian Anthology	Barbara Sang, Joyce Warshow, and Adrienne Smith	Lesbians at Midlife: The Creative Transition	Finalist	
1993	Gay Anthology	John Preston	A Member of the Family	Winner	
1993	Gay Anthology	Dennis Cooper	Discontents	Finalist	
1993	Gay Anthology	John Preston	Flesh and the Word	Finalist	
1993	Gay Anthology	Assotto Saint	Here to Dare	Finalist	
1993	Gay Anthology	George Stambolian	Men on Men 4	Finalist	
1993	Lesbian Anthology	Joan Nestle	The Persistent Desire	Winner	
1993	Lesbian Anthology	Katherine V. Forrest and Barbara Grier	Erotic Naiad	Finalist	
1993	Lesbian Anthology	Tee Corinne	Poetry of Sex	Finalist	
1993	Lesbian Anthology	Anne MacKay	Wolf Girls at Vassar	Finalist	
1993	Lesbian Anthology	Anita L. Pace	Write from the Heart	Finalist	
1994	Anthology	Henry Abelove, Michele Aina Barale and David Halperin	Lesbian and Gay Studies Reader	Winner	
1994	Anthology	Raymond Luczak	Eyes of Desire	Finalist	
1994	Anthology	Bennett L. Singer	Growing Up Gay	Finalist	
1994	Anthology	Julia Penelope and Susan Wolfe	Lesbian Culture	Finalist	
1994	Anthology	Arlene Stein	Sisters, Sexperts, and Queers	Finalist	
1995	Anthology Fiction	Lillian Faderman	Chloe Plus Olivia	Winner	
1995	Anthology Fiction	Ira Silverberg and Amy Scholder	High Risk 2	Finalist	
1995	Anthology Fiction	Irene Zahava	Lavender Mansions	Finalist	
1995	Anthology Fiction	David Bergman	Men on Men 5	Finalist	
1995	Anthology Fiction	Sharon Lim-Hing	The Very Inside	Finalist	
1995	Anthology Nonfiction	Joan Nestle and John Preston	Sister and Brother	Winner	
1995	Anthology Nonfiction	Mark Thompson	Long Road to Freedom	Finalist	
1995	Anthology Nonfiction	Kevin Jennings	One Teacher in Ten	Finalist	
1995	Anthology Nonfiction	Julia Penelope	Out of the Class Closet	Finalist	
1995	Anthology Nonfiction	Patrick Higgins	Queer Reader	Finalist	
1996	Anthology Fiction	E.J. Levy	Tasting Life Twice	Winner	
1996	Anthology Fiction	Catherine McKinley and L. Joyce Delaney	Afrekete	Finalist	
1996	Anthology Fiction	Pat Califia and Janine Fuller	Forbidden Passages	Finalist	
1996	Anthology Fiction	Robert Drake	His	Finalist	
1996	Anthology Fiction	Eileen Myles and Liz Kotz	New Fuck You	Finalist	
1996	Anthology Nonfiction	Claude J. Summers	Gay and Lesbian Literary Heritage	Winner	
1996	Anthology Nonfiction	Karla Jay	Dyke Life	Finalist	
1996	Anthology Nonfiction	Leslea Newman	A Loving Testimony	Finalist	
1996	Anthology Nonfiction	Lynn Witt, Sherry Thomas, and Eric Marcus	Out in All Directions	Finalist	
1996	Anthology Nonfiction	Lynn Yamaguchi and Karen Barber	Tomboys	Finalist	
1997	Anthology Fiction	Joan Nestle and Naomi Holoch	Women on Women 3	Winner	
1997	Anthology Fiction	Shawn Stewart Ruff	Go the Way Your Blood Beats	Finalist	
1997	Anthology Fiction	David Bergman	Men on Men 6	Finalist	
1997	Anthology Fiction	Victoria Brownworth	Night Bites	Finalist	
1997	Anthology Fiction	Bruce Morrow and Charles H. Rowell	Shade	Finalist	
1997	Anthology Nonfiction	Michael Bronski	Taking Liberties	Winner	
1997	Anthology Nonfiction	Bruce Bawer	Beyond Queer	Finalist	
1997	Anthology Nonfiction	Patrick Merla	Boys Like Us	Finalist	
1997	Anthology Nonfiction	Robin Bernstein and Seth Clark Silberman	Generation Q	Finalist	
1997	Anthology Nonfiction	Lee Lynch and Akia Woods	Off the Rag	Finalist	
1998	Anthology Fiction	Robert Drake and Terry Wolverton	His(2)	Winner	
1998	Anthology Fiction	Brian Bouldrey	Best American Gay Fiction 2	Finalist	
1998	Anthology Fiction	Tristan Taormino	Best Lesbian Erotica 1997	Finalist	
1998	Anthology Fiction	Christian McEwen	Jo's Girls: Tomboy Tales of High Adventure, True Grit, and Real Life	Finalist	
1998	Anthology Fiction	Peter Burton	The Mammoth Book of Gay Short Stories	Finalist	
1998	Anthology Nonfiction	Gordon Brent Ingram, AnneMarie Bouthillette, and Yolanda Retter	Queers in Space: Communities, Public Places, Sites of Resistance	Winner	
1998	Anthology Nonfiction	Michel Lowenthal	Gay Men at the Millennium	Finalist	
1998	Anthology Nonfiction	Jess Wells	Lesbians Raising Sons	Finalist	
1998	Anthology Nonfiction	Rictor Norton	My Dear Boy: Gay Love Letters Through the Centuries	Finalist	
1998	Anthology Nonfiction	Carol Queen and Lawrence Schimel	PoMoSexuals: Challenging Assumptions About Gender and Sexuality	Finalist	
1999	Anthology Fiction	Byrne R.S. Fone	Columbia Anthology of Gay Literature	Winner	
1999	Anthology Fiction	Lawrence Schimel	Mammoth Book of Gay Erotica	Finalist	
1999	Anthology Fiction	Joel Tan	Men on Men 7	Finalist	
1999	Anthology Fiction	Joel Tan	Queer PAPI Porn	Finalist	
1999	Anthology Fiction	Michele Karlsberg and Karen X. Tulchinsky	To Be Continued	Finalist	
1999	Anthology Nonfiction	Nisa Donnelly	Mom: Candid Memoirs by Lesbians About the First Woman in Their Life	Winner (tie)	
1999	Anthology Nonfiction	David L. Eng	Q and A: Queer in Asian America	Winner (tie)	
1999	Anthology Nonfiction	Lucy Jane Bledsoe	Lesbian Travels	Finalist	
1999	Anthology Nonfiction	Clifford Chase	Queer 13	Finalist	
1999	Anthology Nonfiction	Kevin Jennings	Telling Tales Out of School	Finalist	
2000	Anthology Fiction	Naomi Holoch, Joan Nestle, and Nancy Holden	Vintage Book of International Lesbian Fiction	Winner	
2000	Anthology Fiction	Jaime Manrique and Jesse Dorris	Besame Mucho: New Gay Latino Fiction	Finalist	
2000	Anthology Fiction	Robert Drake and Terry Wolverton	Hers 3	Finalist	
2000	Anthology Fiction	Robert Drake and Terry Wolverton	His 3	Finalist	
2000	Anthology Fiction	Emma Donoghue	Mammoth Book of Lesbian Short Stories	Finalist	
2000	Anthology Nonfiction	Kris Kleindienst	This Is What Lesbian Looks Like	Winner (tie)	
2000	Anthology Nonfiction	Steve Hogan and Lee Hudson	Completely Queer: The Gay and Lesbian Encyclopedia	Winner (tie)	
2000	Anthology Nonfiction	Joan Larkin	A Woman Like That	Finalist	
2000	Anthology Nonfiction	Larry Gross and James D. Woods	Columbia Reader on Lesbians and Gay Men in Media, Society and Politics	Finalist	
2000	Anthology Nonfiction	Charles Michael Smith	Fighting Words	Finalist	
2001	Anthology Fiction	David Bergman and Karl Woelz	Men on Men 2000	Winner	
2001	Anthology Fiction	Robert Drake and Terry Wolverton	Circa 2000: Lesbian Fiction at the Millenium	Finalist	
2001	Anthology Fiction	Lawrence Schimel	Kosher Meat	Finalist	
2001	Anthology Fiction	Michael Rowe	Queer Fear	Finalist	
2001	Anthology Fiction	Ruth Vanita and Saleem Kidwai	Same Sex Love in India	Finalist	
2001	Anthology Nonfiction	Noelle Howey and Ellen Samuels	Out of the Ordinary	Winner	
2001	Anthology Nonfiction	Victoria Brownworth	Coming Out of Cancer	Finalist	
2001	Anthology Nonfiction	Jess Wells	Home Fronts	Finalist	
2001	Anthology Nonfiction	Amy Sonnie	Revolutionary Voices	Finalist	
2001	Anthology Nonfiction	Dean Kostos	Mama's Boy	Finalist	
2002	Anthologies - Fiction	Helen Sandler	Diva Book of Short Stories	Winner	
2002	Anthologies - Fiction	Jess Wells	Love Shook My Heart 2	Finalist	
2002	Anthologies - Fiction	Nicola Griffith and Stephen Page	Reading the Landscape: Horror	Finalist	
2002	Anthologies - Fiction	Jay Quinn	Rebel Yell: Stories by Contemporary Southern Gay Authors	Finalist	
2002	Anthologies - Fiction	Quang Bao, Hanya Yanagihara, and Timothy Lui	Take Out: Queer Writing from Asian Pacific America	Finalist	
2002	Anthology Nonfiction	Constantine-Simms	The Greatest Taboo: Homosexuality In Black Communities	Winner	
2002	Anthology Nonfiction	Catherine Reid and Holly K. Iglesias	His Hands, His Tools, His Sex, His Dress: Lesbian Writers on Their Fathers	Finalist	
2002	Anthology Nonfiction	Terry Goldie	In a Queer Country	Finalist	
2002	Anthology Nonfiction	Rebecca Alpert, Sue Levi Elwell, and Shirley Idelson	Lesbian Rabbis: The First Generation	Finalist	
2002	Anthology Nonfiction	Winston Leyland	Out in the Castro	Finalist	
2003	Anthology Fiction	Devon Carbado, Dwight McBride and Don Weise	Black Like Us	Winner	
2003	Anthology Fiction	Peter Burton	Bend Sinister – The Gay Times Book of Disturbing Stories	Finalist	
2003	Anthology Fiction	Michael Rowe	Queer Fear II	Finalist	
2003	Anthology Fiction	Chris Kenry, William J. Mann, Andy Schell, and Ben Tyler	Summer Share	Finalist	
2003	Anthology Fiction	Jay Quinn	Rebel Yell 2	Finalist	
2003	Anthology Nonfiction	Bruce Shenitz	The Man I Might Become	Winner	
2003	Anthology Nonfiction	Lawrence Schimel	Found Tribe	Finalist	
2003	Anthology Nonfiction	Benjamin Shepard and Ronald Hayduk	From ACT UP to the WTO	Finalist	
2003	Anthology Nonfiction	Joan Nestle, Riki Wilchins, and Claire Howell	GenderQueer	Finalist	
2003	Anthology Nonfiction	Analouise Keating and Gloria Anzaldua	This Bridge We Call Home	Finalist	
2004	Anthology Fiction	Michael Bronski	Pulp Friction	Winner	
2004	Anthology Fiction	Jon Jeffrey, Chris Kenry, William J. Mann, and Ben Tyler	All I Want for Christmas	Finalist	
2004	Anthology Fiction	Angela Brown	Best Lesbian Love Stories 2003	Finalist	
2004	Anthology Fiction	Karl Woelz	M2M	Finalist	
2004	Anthology Fiction	Lydia Hall	Telling Moments	Finalist	
2004	Anthology Nonfiction	Bob Guter and John R. Killacky	Queer Crips	Winner	
2004	Anthology Nonfiction	Kevin Bentley	Boyfriends from Hell	Finalist	
2004	Anthology Nonfiction	Robert Klitzman and Ronald Bayer	Mortal Secrets	Finalist	
2004	Anthology Nonfiction	Toni Amato and Mary Davies	Pinned Down by Pronouns	Finalist	
2004	Anthology Nonfiction	Greg Wharton	The Love that Dare Not Speak Its Name	Finalist	
2005	Anthology Fiction	Donald Weise	Fresh Men: New Voices in Gay Fiction	Winner	
2005	Anthology Fiction	Clint Catalyst and Michelle Tea	Pills, Thrills, Chills, and Heartache: Adventures in the First Person	Finalist	
2005	Anthology Fiction	Angela Brown	Best Lesbian Love Stories 2004	Finalist	
2005	Anthology Fiction	Peter Burton	Serendipity: The Gay Times Book of New Stories	Finalist	
2005	Nonfiction Anthology	Greg Wharton and Ian Philips	I Do/I Don't: Queers on Marriage	Winner	
2005	Nonfiction Anthology	Mary Burger, Robert Gluck, Camille Roy, and Gail Scott	Biting the Error: Writers Explore Narrative	Finalist	
2005	Nonfiction Anthology	Angela Brown	Mentsh: On Being Jewish and Queer	Finalist	
2005	Nonfiction Anthology	Mattilda Bernstein Sycamore	That's Revolting!: Queer Strategies for Resisting Assimilation	Finalist	
2005	Nonfiction Anthology	Raphael Kadushin	Wonderlands	Finalist	
2006	Anthology	E. Lynn Harris	Freedom in this Village: 25 Years of Black, Gay Men's Writing	Winner	
2006	Anthology	Emanuel Xavier	Bullets and Butterflies: Queer Spoken Word Poetry	Finalist	
2006	Anthology	Wendell Ricketts	Everything I Have is Blue: Short Fiction by Working-Class Men	Finalist	
2006	Anthology	Katherine V. Forrest	Lesbian Pulp Fiction	Finalist	
2006	Anthology	Anna Camilleri	Red Light: Superheroes, Saints, and Sluts	Finalist	
2007	LGBT Anthology	Greg Herren and Paul J. Willis	Love, Bourbon Street	Winner	
2007	LGBT Anthology	Toby Johnson and Steve Berman	Charmed Lives	Finalist	
2007	LGBT Anthology	Harlyn Aizley	Confessions of the Other Mother	Finalist	
2007	LGBT Anthology	Ted Gideonse and Rob Williams	From Boys to Men	Finalist	
2007	LGBT Anthology	Catherine Lake and Nairne Holtz	No Margins: Writing Canadian Fiction in Lesbian	Finalist	
2008	LGBT Anthology	Richard Labonte and Lawrence Schimel	First Person Queer	Winner	
2008	LGBT Anthology	Michelle Tea	Baby Remember My Name	Finalist	
2008	LGBT Anthology	Jennifer Camper	Juicy Mother 2	Finalist	
2008	LGBT Anthology	Sean Meriwether and Greg Wharton	Men of Mystery: Homoerotic Tales of Intrigue and Suspense	Finalist	
2008	LGBT Anthology	Richard Canning	Vital Signs	Finalist	
2009	LGBT Anthology	Thomas Glave	Our Caribbean	Winner	
2009	LGBT Anthology	Peter Burton	A Casualty of War: Gay Short Fiction	Finalist	
2009	LGBT Anthology	Raphael Kadushin	Big Trips: More Good Gay Travel Writing	Finalist	
2009	LGBT Anthology	Sabrina Chapadjiev	Live Through This	Finalist	
2009	LGBT Anthology	Chris Freeman and James J. Berg	Love, West Hollywood	Finalist	
2010	LGBT Anthology	Ariel Gore	Portland Queer: Tales of the Rose City	Winner	
2010	LGBT Anthology	David Bergman	Gay American Autobiography: Writings from Whitman to Sedaris	Finalist	
2010	LGBT Anthology	Gilbert Herdt	Moral Panics, Sex Panics: Fear and the Fight Over Sexual Rights	Finalist	
2010	LGBT Anthology	Michael Montlack	My Diva: 65 Gay Men on the Women Who Inspire Them	Finalist	
2010	LGBT Anthology	Tommi Avicolli Mecca	Smash the Church, Smash the State! The Early Years of Gay Liberation	Finalist	
2011	LGBT Anthology	Kate Bornstein and S. Bear Bergman	Gender Outlaws: The Next Generation	Winner	
2011	LGBT Anthology	Radclyffe	Best Lesbian Romance 2010	Finalist	
2011	LGBT Anthology	David M. Halperin and Valerie Traub	Gay Shame	Finalist	
2011	LGBT Anthology	Sassafras Lowrey	Kicked Out	Finalist	
2011	LGBT Anthology	Tisa Bryant and Ernest Hardy	War Diaries	Finalist	
2012	LGBT Anthology	Michael Hames-García and Ernesto Javier Martínez	Gay Latino Studies: A Critical Reader	Winner	
2012	LGBT Anthology	Ivan E. Coyote and Zena Sharman	Persistence: All Ways Butch and Femme	Finalist	
2012	LGBT Anthology	Lazaro Lima and Felice Picano	Ambientes: New Queer Latino Writing	Finalist	
2012	LGBT Anthology	Qwo-Li Driskill, Daniel Heath Justice, Deborah Miranda, and Lisa Tatonetti	Sovereign Erotics: A Collection of Two-Spirit Literature	Finalist	
2012	LGBT Anthology	Mark Thompson	The Fire in Moonlight: Stories from the Radical Faeries	Finalist	
2013	LGBT Anthology	Justin Hall	No Straight Lines: Four Decades of Queer Comics	Winner	
2013	LGBT Anthology	Keith Boykin	For Colored Boys	Finalist	
2013	LGBT Anthology	Audrey Bilger and Michele Kort	Here Come the Brides!: Reflections on Lesbian Love and Marriage	Finalist	
2013	LGBT Anthology	Mattilda Bernstein Sycamore	Why Are Faggots So Afraid of Faggots? Flaming Challenges to Masculinity, Objectification, and the Desire to Conform	Finalist	
2014	LGBT Anthology - Fiction	Karen Martin and Makhosazana Xaba	Queer Africa: New and Collected Fiction	Winner	
2014	LGBT Anthology - Nonfiction	Jim Elledge and David Groff	Who's Yer Daddy?: Gay Writers Celebrate Their Mentors and Forerunners	Winner	
2014	LGBT Anthology	Harvey Milk, Jason Edward Black, and Charles E. Morris	An Archive of Hope: Harvey Milk's Speeches and Writings	Finalist	
2014	LGBT Anthology	Brittany Fonte and Regie Cabico	Flicker and Spark: A Contemporary Queer of Spoken Word and Poetry	Finalist	
2014	LGBT Anthology	Evan J. Peterson and Vincent Kovar	Ghosts in Gaslight. Monsters in Steam. Gay City: Volume 5	Finalist	
2014	LGBT Anthology	Adelaida R. Del Castillo and Gibran Guido	Queer in Aztlan: Chicano Male Recollections of Consciousness and Coming Out	Finalist	
2014	LGBT Anthology	Tristan Taormino, Constance Penley, Celine Parrenas Shimizu, and Mireille Miller-Young	The Feminist Porn Book	Finalist	
2014	LGBT Anthology	Megan Volpert	This Assignment Is So Gay: LGBTIQ Poets on the Art of Teaching	Finalist	
2014	LGBT Anthology	T.C. Tolbert and Tim Trace Peterson	Troubling the Line: Trans and Genderqueer Poetry and Poetics	Finalist	
2014	LGBT Anthology	Vivek Shraya	What I LOVE about being QUEER	Finalist	
2015	LGBT Anthology	Leila K. Rupp and Susan K. Freeman	Understanding and Teaching US Lesbian, Gay, Bisexual, and Transgender History	Winner	
2015	LGBT Anthology	Bruce Gillespie	A Family by Any Other Name: Exploring Queer Relationships	Finalist	
2015	LGBT Anthology	Charles Stephens and Steven G. Fullwood	Black Gay Genius: Answering Joseph Beam's Call	Finalist	
2015	LGBT Anthology	Mark McNease and Stephen Dolainski	Outer Voices Inner Lives	Finalist	
2015	LGBT Anthology	Douglas Ray	The Queer South: LGBTQ Writers on the American South	Finalist	
2016	LGBTQ Anthology - Fiction	Sfé R. Monster and Taneka Stotts	Beyond: The Queer Sci-Fi and Fantasy Comic	Winner	
2016	LGBTQ Anthology - Nonfiction	Damien Luxe, Heather M. Ács, and Sabina Ibarrola	Glitter and Grit: Queer Performance from the Heels on Wheels Femme Galaxy	Winner	
2016	Anthology	Julie Bozza	A Pride of Poppies: Modern GLBTQI fiction of the Great War	Finalist	
2016	Anthology	Holly Hughes, Carmelita Tropicana, and Jill Dolan	Memories of the Revolution	Finalist	
2016	Anthology	Amy L. Stone and Jaime Cantrell	Out of the Closet, Into the Archives: Researching Sexual Histories	Finalist	
2016	Anthology	Nívea Castro with Geny Cabral	Soy Lesbiana y Que! Out Latina Lesbians	Finalist	
2016	Anthology	Torsten Højer	Speak My Language, and Other Stories: An of Gay Fiction	Finalist	
2016	Anthology	Merritt Kopas	Videogames for Humans: Twine Authors in Conversation	Finalist	
2017	Anthology	Zena Sharman	The Remedy: Queer and Trans Voices on Health and Health Care	Winner	
2017	Anthology	Jon Macy and Tara Madison Avery	ALPHABET: The LGBTQAIU Creators from Prism Comics	Finalist	
2017	Anthology	Martha Amore and Lucian Childs	Building Fires in the Snow: A Collection of Alaska LGBTQ Short Fiction and Poetry	Finalist	
2017	Anthology	E. Patrick Johnson	No Tea, No Shade: New Writings in Black Queer Studies	Finalist	
2017	Anthology	David J. Getsy	Queer	Finalist	
2018	Anthology	Juliana Delgado Lopera	¡Cuéntamelo! Oral Histories by LGBT Latino Immigrants	Winner	
2018	Anthology	Candace Walsh and Barbara Straus Lodge	Greetings from Janeland: Women Write More About Leaving Men for Women	Finalist	
2018	Anthology	Cat Fitzpatrick and Casey Plett	Meanwhile, Elsewhere: Science Fiction and Fantasy from Transgender Writers	Finalist	
2018	Anthology	Joamette Gil	Power and Magic: The Queer Witch Comics	Finalist	
2018	Anthology	Makhosazana Xaba and Karen Martin	Queer Africa 2: new stories	Finalist	
2018	Anthology	Charlie Craggs	To My Trans Sisters	Finalist	
2018	Anthology	Avi Ben-Zeev and Pete Bailey	Trans Homo...Gasp! Gay FTM and Cis Men on Sex and Love	Finalist	
2018	Anthology	Reina Gossett, Eric A. Stanley, and Johanna Burton	Trap Door: Trans Cultural Production and the Politics of Visibility	Finalist	
2019	LGBTQ Anthology—Fiction	The Other Foundation	As You Like It: The Gerald Kraak Volume II	Winner	
2019	LGBTQ Anthology—Nonfiction	Roxane Gay	Not That Bad: Dispatches from Rape Culture	Winner	
2019	LGBTQ Anthology	Taneka Stotts and Sfé R. Monster	Beyond II: The Queer Post-Apocalyptic and Urban Fantasy Comic	Finalist	
2019	LGBTQ Anthology	Miah Jeffra, Chad Koch, et al.	Foglifter Volume 3, Issue 1	Finalist	
2019	LGBTQ Anthology	Peter Dickinson, C.E. Gatchalian, Kathleen Oliver, and Dalbir Singh	Q2Q: Queer Canadian Performance Texts	Finalist	
2019	LGBTQ Anthology	Phyll Opoku-Gyimah, Rikki Beadle-Blair, and John R. Gordon	Sista!: An Anthology of Writing By and About Same Gender Loving Women of African/Caribbean Descent with a UK Connection	Finalist	
2019	LGBTQ Anthology	Sadie Epstein-Fine and Makeda Zook	Spawning Generations: Rants and Reflections on Growing Up with LGBTQ Parents	Finalist	
2019	LGBTQ Anthology	Lexie Bean	Written on the Body: Letters from Trans and Non-Binary Survivors of Sexual Assault and Domestic Violence	Finalist	
2020	Anthology	Noam Sienna	A Rainbow Thread: An of Queer Jewish Texts from the First Century to 1969	Winner (tie)	
2020	Anthology	Aishah Shahidah Simmons	Love WITH Accountability: Digging up the Roots of Child Sexual Abuse	Winner (tie)	
2020	Anthology	Luiza Flynn-Goodlett	Foglifter Volume 4 Issue 2	Finalist	
2020	Anthology	Amber Dawn and Justin Ducharme	Hustling Verse: An of Sex Workers' Poetry	Finalist	
2020	Anthology	Jeff Mann and Julia Watts	LGBTQ Fiction and Poetry from Appalachia	Finalist	
2020	Anthology	Micah Rajunov and Scott Duane	Nonbinary: Memoirs of Gender and Identity	Finalist	
2020	Anthology	Fatimah Asghar and Safia Elhillo	The BreakBeat Poets Volume 3: Halal if You Hear Me	Finalist	
2020	Anthology	The Other Foundation	The Heart of the Matter: The Gerald Kraak Volume III	Finalist	
2021	LGBTQ Anthology	Joshua Whitehead	Love After the End: An Anthology of Two-Spirit and Indigiqueer Speculative Fiction	Winner	
2021	LGBTQ Anthology	Ejeris Dixon and Leah Lakshmi Piepzna-Samarasinha	Beyond Survival: Strategies and Stories from the Transformative Justice Movement	Finalist	
2021	LGBTQ Anthology	dave ring	Glitter + Ashes: Queer Tales of a World That Wouldn't Die	Finalist	
2021	LGBTQ Anthology	Jos Twist, Ben Vincent, Meg-John Barker, and Kat Gupta	Non-Binary Lives: An Anthology of Intersecting Identities	Finalist	
2021	LGBTQ Anthology	Andrea Abi-Karam and Kay Gabriel	We Want It All: An Anthology of Radical Trans Poetics	Finalist	
2022	LGBTQ Anthology	Briona Simone Jones	Mouths of Rain: An Anthology of Black Lesbian Thought	Winner	
2022	LGBTQ Anthology	Mattilda Bernstein Sycamore (Ed.)	Between Certain Death and a Possible Future: Queer Writing on Growing Up with the AIDS Crisis	Finalist	
2022	LGBTQ Anthology	Martin F. Manalansan IV, Alice Y. Hom, and Kale Bantigue Fajardo	Q & A: Voices from Queer Asian North America	Finalist	
2022	LGBTQ Anthology	Kemi Adeyemi, Kareem Khubchandani, and Ramón H. Rivera-Servera (Eds.)	Queer Nightlife	Finalist	
2022	LGBTQ Anthology	Leanna Keyes, Lindsey Mantoan, and Angela Farr Schiller with Leanna Keyes, Azure D. Osborne-Lee, Ty Defoe, MJ Kaufman, Raphaël Amahl Khouri, j. Chavez, Sharifa Yasmin, and Mashuq Mushtaq Deen (playwrights)	The Methuen Drama Book of Trans Plays	Finalist	
2023	LGBTQ Anthology	Julie R. Enszer and Elena Gross	OutWrite: The Speeches That Shaped LGBTQ Literary Culture	Winner	
2023	LGBTQ Anthology	Michael Walsh (Ed.)	Queer Nature: A Poetry Anthology	Finalist	
2023	LGBTQ Anthology	Elias Jahshan	This Arab is Queer: An Anthology by LGBTQ+ Arab Writers	Finalist	
2023	LGBTQ Anthology	Laura Erickson-Schroth	Trans Bodies, Trans Selves: A Resource by and for Transgender Communities (2nd ed.)	Finalist	
2023	LGBTQ Anthology	Isabela Oliveira and Jed Sabin	Xenocultivars: Stories of Queer Growth	Finalist	
2024	LGBTQ+ Anthology	Tuck Woodstock and Niko Stratis	2 Trans 2 Furious: An extremely serious journal of Transgender Street Racing Studies	Winner	
2024	LGBTQ+ Anthology	Andrew R. Spieldenner and Jeffrey Escoffier	A Pill for Promiscuity: Gay Sex in an Age of Pharmaceuticals	Finalist	
2024	LGBTQ+ Anthology	Madeline Dyer (editor)	Being Ace: An Anthology of Queer, Trans, Femme, and Disabled Stories of Asexual Love and Connection	Finalist	
2024	LGBTQ+ Anthology	Benjamin Schaefer	Fairy Tale Review: The Rainbow Issue	Finalist	
2024	LGBTQ+ Anthology	Bogi Takács (editor)	Rosalind's Siblings: Fiction and Poetry Celebrating Scientists of Marginalized Genders	Finalist	
2025	LGBTQ+ Anthology	Rae Theodore and Nat Burns	Swagger: A Celebration of the Butch Experience	Winner	
2025	LGBTQ+ Anthology	Marwan Kaabour	The Queer Arab Glossary	Finalist	
2025	LGBTQ+ Anthology	Remi Recchia	Transmasculine Poetics: Filling the Gap in Literature & the Silences Around Us	Finalist	
2025	LGBTQ+ Anthology	Rob Costello (ed.)	We Mostly Come Out At Night: 15 Queer Tales of Monsters, Angels & Other Creatures	Finalist	
2025	LGBTQ+ Anthology	Dustin Brookshire	When I Was Straight: A Tribute to Maureen Seaton	Finalist	
2026	LGBTQ+ Anthology	Paul Martineau and Ryan Linkof (eds.)	Queer Lens: A History of Photography	Winner	
2026	LGBTQ+ Anthology	Meghan Kemp-Gee and Megan Praz	Come Out and Play: The Queer Sports Project	Finalist	
2026	LGBTQ+ Anthology	Alden Jones (ed.)	Edge of the World: An Anthology of Queer Travel Writing	Finalist	
2026	LGBTQ+ Anthology	Alex D. Ketchum and Megan J. Elias (eds.)	Queers at the Table: An Illustrated Guide to Queer Food (with Recipes)	Finalist	
2026	LGBTQ+ Anthology	Sarah Fonseca and Octavia Saenz	The New Lesbian Pulp	Finalist	
