= 4th Lambda Literary Awards =

1992 literary awards ceremony

The 4th Lambda Literary Awards were held in 1992 to honour works of LGBT literature published in 1991.

== Special awards ==
Category	Winner
Editor's Choice	Lillian Faderman, Odd Girls and Twilight Lovers: A History of Lesbian Life in 20th Century America
Publisher Service	Barbara Grier and Donna McBride, Naiad Press

== Nominees and winners ==
Category	Author	Title	Result
Children's/Young Adult	Johnny Valentine and Lynette Schmidt	The Duke Who Outlawed Jelly Beans and Other Stories	Winner
Children's/Young Adult	Aaron Fricke and Walter Fricke	Sudden Strangers	Finalist
Children's/Young Adult	Nancy Garden	Lark in the Morning	Finalist
Children's/Young Adult	Ann Heron, Meredith Maran, and Kris Kovick	How Would You Feel if Your Dad Was Gay?	Finalist
Children's/Young Adult	Leslea Newman and Russell Crocker	Gloria Goes to Gay Pride	Finalist
Gay Anthology	Essex Hemphill (ed.)	Brother to Brother: New Writings by Black Gay Men	Winner
Gay Anthology	Robert Drake and Terry Wolverton	Indivisible: New Short Fiction	Finalist
Gay Anthology	John Preston	Hometowns: Gay Men Write About Where They Belong	Finalist
Gay Anthology	Mark Thompson	Leatherfolk: Radical Sex, People, Politics and Practice	Finalist
Gay Anthology	Edmund White	Faber Book of Gay Short Fiction	Finalist
Gay Fiction	Harlan Greene	What the Dead Remember	Winner
Gay Fiction	Dennis Cooper	Frisk	Finalist
Gay Fiction	Melvin Dixon	Vanishing Rooms	Finalist
Gay Fiction	Philip Gambone	Language We Use Up Here	Finalist
Gay Fiction	Paul Monette	Halfway Home	Finalist
Gay Mystery	Joseph Hansen	A Country of Old Men	Winner
Gay Mystery	Stan Cutler	Best Performance by a Patsy	Finalist
Gay Mystery	Stan Cutler	The Face on the Cutting Room Floor	Finalist
Gay Mystery	Larry Townsend	Master’s Counterpoints	Finalist
Gay Mystery	Mark Richard Zubro	Sorry Now?	Finalist
Gay Non-Fiction	Will Roscoe	The Zuni Man-Woman	Winner
Gay Non-Fiction	Roger Austen and John W. Crowley	Genteel Pagan: The Double Life of Charles Warren Stoddard	Finalist
Gay Non-Fiction	Martin Duberman	Cures: A Gay Man’s Odyssey	Finalist
Gay Non-Fiction	Bruce R. Smith	Homosexual Desire in Shakespeare’s England	Finalist
Gay Non-Fiction	David Wojnarowicz	Close to the Knives: A Memoir of Disintegration	Finalist
Gay Poetry	Assotto Saint (ed.)	The Road Before Us: 100 Gay Black Poets	Winner
Gay Poetry	John Ash	The Burnt Pages	Finalist
Gay Poetry	Perry Brass	Sex-Charge	Finalist
Gay Poetry	Mark Doty	Bethlehem in Broad Daylight	Finalist
Gay Poetry	David Trinidad	Hand Over Heart	Finalist
Gay science fiction, fantasy or horror	Frank M. Robinson	The Dark Beyond the Stars	Winner
Gay science fiction, fantasy or horror	Perry Brass	Mirage	Finalist
Gay science fiction, fantasy or horror	Eric Garber	Embracing the Dark	Finalist
Gay science fiction, fantasy or horror	Jay B. Laws	Steam	Finalist
Gay science fiction, fantasy or horror	Jeffrey N. McMahan	Vampires Anonymous	Finalist
Humor	Joe Keenan	Putting on the Ritz	Winner
Humor	Ben Davis	Strange Angel	Finalist
Humor	Elizabeth Dean, Linda Wells, and Andrea Curren	Coming Out!: More Fun ‘n’ Games	Finalist
Humor	Kris Kovick	What I Love About Lesbian Politics Is Arguing with People I Agree With	Finalist
Humor	Rosalind Warren	Women’s Glib: A Collection of Women’s Humor	Finalist
Lesbian Anthology	Carla Trujillo (ed.)	Chicana Lesbians: The Girls Our Mothers Warned Us About	Winner
Lesbian Anthology	Judith Barrington	An Intimate Wilderness: Lesbian Writers on Sexuality	Finalist
Lesbian Anthology	Loraine Hutchins and Lani Ka'ahumanu	Bi Any Other Name: Bisexual People Speak Out	Finalist
Lesbian Anthology	Barbara Sang, Joyce Warshow, and Adrienne Smith	Lesbians at Midlife: The Creative Transition	Finalist
Lesbian Anthology	Terry Wolverton and Robert Drake	Indivisible: New Short Fiction by West Coast Gay & Lesbian Writers	Finalist
Lesbian Fiction	Blanche McCrary Boyd	The Revolution of Little Girls	Winner
Lesbian Fiction	Jewelle Gomez	The Gilda Stories	Winner
Lesbian Fiction	Anna Livia	Minimax	Finalist
Lesbian Fiction	Judith McDaniel	Just Say Yes	Finalist
Lesbian Fiction	Diane Salvatore	Benediction	Finalist
Lesbian Mystery	Katherine V. Forrest	Murder by Tradition	Winner
Lesbian Mystery	Claire McNab	Cop Out	Finalist
Lesbian Mystery	Mary Morell	Final Session	Finalist
Lesbian Mystery	Sandra Scoppettone	Everything You Have is Mine	Finalist
Lesbian Mystery	Amanda Kyle Williams	The Providence File	Finalist
Lesbian Non-Fiction	Sandra Butler and Barbara Rosenblum	Cancer in Two Voices	Winner
Lesbian Non-Fiction	Judith Barrington	An Intimate Wilderness: Lesbian Writers on Sexuality	Finalist
Lesbian Non-Fiction	Lillian Faderman	Odd Girls and Twilight Lovers: A History of Lesbian Life in Twentieth-Century America	Finalist
Lesbian Non-Fiction	Minnie Bruce Pratt	Rebellion: Essays 1980-1991	Finalist
Lesbian Non-Fiction	Diana Souhami	Gertrude and Alice	Finalist
Lesbian Poetry	Adrienne Rich	An Atlas of the Difficult World: Poems 1988-1991	Winner
Lesbian Poetry	Becky Birtha	The Forbidden Poems	Finalist
Lesbian Poetry	Eloise Klein Healy	Artemis in Echo Park	Finalist
Lesbian Poetry	Eileen Myles	Not Me	Finalist
Lesbian Poetry	Maureen Seaton	Fear of Subways	Finalist
Lesbian science fiction, fantasy or horror	Jewelle Gomez	The Gilda Stories	Winner
Lesbian science fiction, fantasy or horror	Judith Alguire	Zeta Base	Finalist
Lesbian science fiction, fantasy or horror	Camarin Grae	Stranded	Finalist
Lesbian science fiction, fantasy or horror	B.L. Holmes	Mega	Finalist
Lesbian science fiction, fantasy or horror	Chris Anne Wolfe	Shadows of Aggar	Finalist
Small Press	Winston Leyland (ed.)	Gay Roots: Twenty Years of Gay Sunshine	Winner
Small Press	Pat Califia	The Advocate Advisor	Finalist
Small Press	Edisol W. Dotson	Putting Out ’91	Finalist
Small Press	Bad Object-Choices	How Do I Look?: Queer Film and Videos	Finalist
Small Press	Garbo	Rusty: How Me and Her Went to Colorado and Everything, Except Not Really	Finalist
