= Jesse Wells =

Jesse Wells may refer to:

- Jesse Welles (born 1992), American singer-songwriter and guitarist
- Jesse Wells, a fictional character in the 2014–2023 American TV series The Flash

== See also ==
- Jesse Welles (disambiguation)
