= 7th Lambda Literary Awards =

1995 literary awards ceremony

The 7th Lambda Literary Awards were held in 1995 to honour works of LGBT literature published in 1994.

== Special awards ==
Category	Winner
Editor's Choice	Mab Segrest, Traitor to the Race
Publisher Service	Barbara Smith, Kitchen Table Press

== Nominees and winners ==
7th Lambda Literary Awards winners and finalists
Category	Author(s)/Editor(s)	Title	Result
Anthologies/Fiction	Lillian Faderman (ed.)	Chloe Plus Olivia	Winner
Anthologies/Fiction	David Bergman (ed.)	Men on Men 5	Finalist
Anthologies/Fiction	Sharon Lim-Hing (ed.)	The Very Inside	Finalist
Anthologies/Fiction	Ira Silverberg and Amy Scholder (ed.)	High Risk 2	Finalist
Anthologies/Fiction	Irene Zahava (ed.)	Lavender Mansions	Finalist
Anthologies/Non-Fiction	Joan Nestle and John Preston	Sister and Brother	Winner
Anthologies/Non-Fiction	Patrick Higgins (ed.)	Queer Reader	Finalist
Anthologies/Non-Fiction	Kevin Jennings (ed.)	One Teacher in Ten	Finalist
Anthologies/Non-Fiction	Julia Penelope (ed.)	Out of the Class Closet	Finalist
Anthologies/Non-Fiction	Mark Thompson (ed.)	Long Road to Freedom	Finalist
Children's & Young Adult	Marion Dane Bauer	Am I Blue?	Winner
Children's & Young Adult	Stacey Donovan	Dive	Finalist
Children's & Young Adult	Ann Heron	2 Teenagers in 20	Finalist
Children's & Young Adult	Scott Nunokawa	Oscar Wilde	Finalist
Children's & Young Adult	Patricia Quinlan	Tiger Flowers	Finalist
Drama	Tony Kushner	Angels in America: Perestroika	Winner
Drama	David Drake	The Night Larry Kramer Kissed Me	Finalist
Drama	Carolyn Gage	Second Coming of Joan of Arc	Finalist
Drama	Cherrie Moraga	Heroes and Saints & Other Plays	Finalist
Drama	Paul Rudnick	Jeffrey	Finalist
Gay Biography & Autobiography	Abraham Verghese	My Own Country	Winner
Gay Biography & Autobiography	Lawrence Mass	Confessions of a Jewish Wagnerite	Finalist
Gay Biography & Autobiography	Paul Monette	Last Watch of the Night	Finalist
Gay Biography & Autobiography	John Preston	My Life as a Pornographer	Finalist
Gay Biography & Autobiography	Ned Rorem	Knowing When to Stop	Finalist
Gay Fiction	Alan Hollinghurst	The Folding Star	Winner
Gay Fiction	Mark Merlis	American Studies	Finalist
Gay Fiction	Joseph Olshan	Nightswimmer	Finalist
Gay Fiction	Douglas Sadownick	Sacred Lips of the Bronx	Finalist
Gay Fiction	Norman Wong	Cultural Revolution	Finalist
Gay Mystery	John Berendt	Midnight in the Garden of Good and Evil	Winner
Gay Mystery	George Baxt	Queer Kind of Love	Finalist
Gay Mystery	Caleb Carr	The Alienist	Finalist
Gay Mystery	Samuel R. Delany	Mad Man	Finalist
Gay Mystery	Grant Michaels	Mask for a Diva	Finalist
Gay Poetry	Thom Gunn	Collected Poems	Winner
Gay Poetry	Rafael Campo	The Other Man Was Me	Finalist
Gay Poetry	Richard McCann	Ghost Letters	Finalist
Gay Poetry	Paul Monette	West of Yesterday, East of Summer	Finalist
Gay Poetry	Assotto Saint	Wishing for Wings	Finalist
Gay Studies	George Chauncey	Gay New York	Winner
Gay Studies	John Boswell	Same-Sex Unions in Pre-Modern Europe	Finalist
Gay Studies	David B. Feinberg	Queer and Loathing	Finalist
Gay Studies	Paul Monette	Last Watch of the Night	Finalist
Gay Studies	Mark Thompson	Gay Soul	Finalist
Humor	Ellen Galford	The Dyke and the Dybbuk	Winner
Humor	Kevin Dilallo and Jack Krumholtz	Unofficial Gay MANual	Finalist
Humor	Mabel Maney	Case of the Good-For-Nothing Girlfriend	Finalist
Humor	Christian McLaughlin	Glamourpuss	Finalist
Humor	David Sedaris	Barrel Fever	Finalist
Lesbian Biography & Autobiography	Renate Stendhal	Gertrude Stein: In Words and Pictures	Winner
Lesbian Biography & Autobiography	Elizabeth Bishop	One Art: Letters	Finalist
Lesbian Biography & Autobiography	Margarethe Cammermeyer and Chris Fisher	Serving in Silence	Finalist
Lesbian Biography & Autobiography	Helen Lefkowitz Horowitz	The Power and the Passion of M. Carey Thomas	Finalist
Lesbian Biography & Autobiography	Mab Segrest	Memoir of a Race Traitor	Finalist
Lesbian Fiction	Rebecca Brown	The Gifts of the Body	Winner
Lesbian Fiction	Emma Donoghue	Sir Fry	Finalist
Lesbian Fiction	Ellen Galford	The Dyke and the Dybbuk	Finalist
Lesbian Fiction	Heather Lewis	House Rules	Finalist
Lesbian Fiction	Eileen Myles	Chelsea Girls	Finalist
Lesbian Mystery	Ellen Hart	Small Sacrifice	Winner
Lesbian Mystery	Randye Lordon	Sister’s Keeper	Finalist
Lesbian Mystery	Mabel Maney	Case of the Good-For-Nothing Girlfriend	Finalist
Lesbian Mystery	Claire McNab	Body Guard	Finalist
Lesbian Mystery	Sandra Scoppettone	My Sweet Untraceable You	Finalist
Lesbian Poetry	Marilyn Hacker	Winter Numbers	Winner
Lesbian Poetry	Sapphire	American Dreams	Finalist
Lesbian Poetry	June Jordan	Haruko/Love Poems	Finalist
Lesbian Poetry	Mary Oliver	White Pine	Finalist
Lesbian Poetry	Linda Smukler	Normal Sex	Finalist
Lesbian Studies	Dorothy Allison	Skin	Winner
Lesbian Studies	Lillian Faderman	Chloe Plus Olivia	Finalist
Lesbian Studies	Susan Fox Rogers	Sportsdykes	Finalist
Lesbian Studies	Sarah Schulman	My American History	Finalist
Lesbian Studies	Kiss and Tell Collective	Her Tongue on My Theory	Finalist
Photography & Visual Arts	Nancy Andrews	Family: A Portrait of Gay and Lesbian America	Winner
Photography & Visual Arts	Jim French	Art of the Male Nude	Finalist
Photography & Visual Arts	Jack Kugelmass	Masked Culture	Finalist
Photography & Visual Arts	Out	Out in America	Finalist
Photography & Visual Arts	Mark Thompson	Long Road to Freedom	Finalist
Science fiction, fantasy or horror	Melissa Scott	Trouble and Her Friends	Winner
Science fiction, fantasy or horror	Suzy McKee Charnas	The Furies	Finalist
Science fiction, fantasy or horror	Mercedes Lackey	Storm Warning	Finalist
Science fiction, fantasy or horror	Nancy Springer	Metal Angel	Finalist
Science fiction, fantasy or horror	Jean Stewart	Warriors of Isis	Finalist
Small Press	Kiss and Tell Collective	Her Tongue on My Theory	Winner
Small Press	Sapphire	American Dreams	Finalist
Small Press	Dorothy Allison	Skin	Finalist
Small Press	James Earl Hardy	B-Boy Blues	Finalist
Small Press	Achy Obejas	We Came All the Way From Cuba So You Could Dress Like This?	Finalist
