= David L. Eng =

Academic

- Awards: Lambda Literary Award for Anthology (2001)

Academic background
- Education: Columbia University (BA); University of California, Berkeley (PhD)

Academic work
- Discipline: English literature; Asian American studies; Gender, sexuality, and women's studies
- Institutions: Columbia University; Rutgers University; University of Pennsylvania

David L. Eng is an scholar of English literature, Asian American studies, and gender, sexuality, and women's studies. He is the author of Racial Castration (2001), The Feeling of Kinship (2010), and Reparations and the Human (2025), co-author of Racial Melancholia, Racial Dissociation (2019), and co-editor of Q & A (1998) and Loss (2003). As of 2026, Eng is a professor at the University of Pennsylvania.

== Education ==
Eng earned a Bachelor of Arts in English from Columbia University, followed by a Doctor of Philosophy in comparative literature from the University of California, Berkeley.

== Career ==
Eng began his academic career teaching at Columbia University and Rutgers University, then joined the University of Pennsylvania in 2007. As of 2026, he continues at the University of Pennsylvania, where he holds the title of Richard L. Fisher Professor of English; he is also a professor of Asian American studies, comparative literature, literary theory, and gender, sexuality, and women's studies.

Q & A: Queer in Asian America, which Eng co-edited with Alice Y. Hom, was published by Temple University Press in 1998. The book explores what it means to be queer and Asian American, touching on subjects related to "homophobia, xenophobia, and racism (and, in the case of women, sexism)". It consists of six parts: "Working Out", "Im/Proper Images", "Keeping Records", "Closets/Margins", "Paternity", and "Out Here and Over There". Q & A won the 1999 Lambda Literary Award for Non-fiction Anthology, and the Association for Asian American Studies's 2001 Book Award for Cultural Studies.

Eng's first authored book, Racial Castration: Managing Masculinity in Asian America, was published by Duke University Press in 2001. Through Asian American studies and psychoanalytic theory, the book explores the connections between racial and sexual identities, particularly examining how media has constructed a cultural understanding of Asian American men as queer or less masculine. In making this argument, Eng draws from diverse media, including Louis Chu's novel Eat a Bowl of Tea (1961), Lonny Kaneko's short story "The Shoyu Kid" (1976), Maxine Hong Kingston's short story collection China Men (1980), David Henry Hwang's play M. Butterfly (1988), and David Wong Louie's short story collection Pangs of Love (1991).

Loss: The Politics of Mourning, which Eng co-edited with David Kazanjian, was published by the University of California Press in 2003. Considering widespread and devastating loss over the previous century, the book explores "'what is lost' in terms of 'what remains.'"

Eng's second authored book, The Feeling of Kinship: Queer Liberalism and the Racialization of Intimacy, was published by Duke University Press in 2010.

Racial Melancholia, Racial Dissociation: On the Social and Psychic Lives of Asian Americans, which Eng co-authored with Shinhee Han, was published by Duke University Press in 2019.

== Publications ==
- Eng, David L.; Hom, Alice Y., eds. (1998). Q & A: Queer in Asian America. Temple University Press. ISBN 978-1-566-39640-0.
- Eng, David L. (2001). Racial Castration: Managing Masculinity in Asian America. Duke University Press. doi:10.1215/9780822381020. ISBN 978-0-8223-8102-0.
- Eng, David L.; Kazanjian, David, eds. (2003). Loss: The Politics of Mourning. Afterword by Judith Butler. University of California Press. ISBN 978-0-520-23236-5.
- Eng, David L. (2010). The Feeling of Kinship: Queer Liberalism and the Racialization of Intimacy. Duke University Press. doi:10.1215/9780822392828. ISBN 978-0-822-34715-6.
- Eng, David L.; Han, Shinhee (2019). Racial Melancholia, Racial Dissociation: On the Social and Psychic Lives of Asian Americans. Duke University Press. doi:10.1215/9781478002680. ISBN 978-1-478-00125-6.
- Eng, David L. (2025). Reparations and the Human. Duke University Press. doi:10.1215/9781478060840. ISBN 978-1-478-02862-8.
