= Jesse Welles (disambiguation) =

Jesse Welles (born 1992) is an American singer-songwriter and guitarist.

Jesse Welles may also refer to:

- Jesse Welles (actress) (born 1946), American actress
- Jesse Wells, a fictional character in The Flash

== See also ==
- Jess Wells (born 1955), American author
- Jesse Wellens, American YouTuber
