= Victoria Brownworth =

American journalist, writer and editor (1956–2025)

- Born: February 1956
- Died: May 22, 2025 (aged 69); Philadelphia, Pennsylvania, U.S.
- Education: Temple University
- Known for: Journalist, writer, editor

Victoria A. Brownworth (February 1956 – May 22, 2025) was an American journalist, writer and editor. Throughout the 1980s and 1990s, she wrote numerous award-winning articles about AIDS in women, children, and people of color. She was the first person in the United States to write a column about lesbianism in a daily newspaper.

In 1983, Brownworth reported on the "corruption at a Philadelphia based social service agency." She also won the Lambda Literary Award for Lesbian Mystery for her 2016 novel Ordinary Mayhem.

Brownworth used "she" and "they" pronouns.

== Early life ==
Brownworth was born in February 1956. She published her first book of poetry at age 18 and began writing for Philadelphia Gay News when she was 17.

Brownworth studied American studies and women's history at Temple University and represented the university at the first National Women's Studies Association. Near graduation, she became the star witness "in the first federal police brutality trial in Philadelphia." The police were acquitted, and she began her career in advocacy journalism.

== Career ==
In the 1980s and early 1990s, Brownworth worked for the Philadelphia Inquirer and Philadelphia Daily News. She was the first open lesbian to have a daily column, and may have been the first to have a daily column about lesbian issues. Later, she became a host on Amazon Country on WXPN-FM, the first lesbian radio program in the United States.

In 1993, after being diagnosed with multiple sclerosis, Brownworth began focusing primarily on writing books and editing anthologies.

She was also a contributing editor for Curve and Lambda Literary Review and was a regular contributing writer for SheWired, Advocate, The Independent, and HuffPost.

In 2010, Brownworth co-founded Tiny Satchel Press, a publishing company that printed young adult books featuring characters from systemically marginalized populations.

Brownworth won the Society of Professional Journalism Award and the NLGJA Award.

== Personal life and death ==
In her early-to-mid-thirties, Brownworth started experiencing a number of symptoms she chalked up to being overworked (e.g., general malaise and difficulty walking). In one 18-month period, she broke 13 bones due to her symptoms, though she still believed nothing was seriously wrong. However, when she went blind due to optic neuritis, she visited a doctor who diagnosed her with primary progressive multiple sclerosis, a diagnosis she resisted for over a year. In 1994, she began to use a wheelchair, which she used on and off thereafter.

Brownworth also had breast cancer, a damaged heart, and "a spot on [her] lung."

Brownworth lived in Philadelphia. She and her partner, Maddy Gold, met while attending the Philadelphia High School for Girls and dated off and on for years. Brownworth and Gold had been living together for many years when in 2014 Pennsylvania deemed the ban on same-sex marriage to be unconstitutional, and Brownworth immediately proposed. They were married in October of that year on their 15-year anniversary. Gold died of cancer on November 12, 2022. After Gold's death, Brownworth was harassed by anti-vaccine activists following the release of Died Suddenly, an anti-vaccine film. Brownworth died after a long struggle with cancer on May 22, 2025, at the age of 69.

== Awards ==
Awards and honors for Brownworth's writing
Year	Title	Award/Honor	Result	Ref.
1980s		Gay & Lesbian Press Association's Award for Ongoing Coverage of Non-Medical Issues		
1980s		Gay & Lesbian Press Association's Award for Ongoing Coverage Health Coverage		
1980s		Gay & Lesbian Press Association's Award for National News Reporting		
1997	Night Bites	Lambda Literary Award for Nonfiction Anthology	Finalist	
2000	Night Shade: Gothic Tales by Women	Lambda Literary Award for Science Fiction/Fantasy	Finalist	
2001	Coming Out of Cancer	Lambda Literary Award for Nonfiction Anthology	Finalist	
2007	"Our Dirtiest Secret: Domestic Violence in Our Community"	Suburban Newspaper Association's Award for Investigative Reporting	Winner	
2008	The Golden Age of Lesbian Erotica	Lambda Literary Award for Erotica	Finalist	
2008	"Killing Ourselves with Hate: Suicide in the GLBT Community"	NLGJA Excellence in News Writing Award	Second	
2009	"Hiding in Plain Sight"	Society of Professional Journalists's Award for Enterprise Story	Winner	
2011	Day of the Dead	American Library Association's Over the Rainbow Project	Selection	
2012	From Where We Sit	Moonbeam Award for Young Adult Fiction - Historical/Cultural	Silver	
2014	"Trans Sex Workers"	Keystone Press Award for Series	Second	
2014	"Trans Sex Workers"	Society of Professional Journalists's Award for Enterprise Reporting	Winner	
2016	Ordinary Mayhem	Lambda Literary Award for Lesbian Mystery	Winner	
2020	"COVID and the LGBTQ community"	Sigma Delta Chi Award for Newspaper Feature Reporting in a Non-Daily Publication	Winner	

== Publications ==
=== Anthology contributions ===
- Women of Mystery: An Anthology (2006)
- Fantasy: Untrue Stories of Lesbian Passion (2007)
- Wild Nights: (Mostly) True Stories of Women Loving Women (2007)
- Persistence: All Ways Butch and Femme (2011)
- Women of the Mean Streets (2011)
- Night Shadows: Queer Horror (2012)

=== Anthologies edited ===
- Out for Blood (1995)
- Night Bites: Vampire Stories by Women Tales of Blood and Lust (1996)
- Out for More Blood (1996)
- Night Shade: Gothic Tales by Women, with Judith M. Redding (1999)
- Restricted Access: Lesbians on Disability (1999)
- Coming Out of Cancer: Writings from the Lesbian Cancer Epidemic (2000)
- Bed: New Lesbian Erotica (2007)
- The Golden Age of Lesbian Erotica: 1920-1940, with Judith M. Redding (2007)
- From Where We Sit: Black Writers Write Black Youth (2011)
- Ordinary Mayhem (2015)

=== Books written ===
- Film Fatales: Independent Women Directors, with Judith M. Redding (1997)
- Day of the Dead (2009)
- Ordinary Mayhem (2015)
- Erasure (2017)
- Sleep So Deep (2017)

=== Essay collections ===
- Too Queer: Essays from a Radical Life (1996)
