= Carla Trujillo =

American novelist

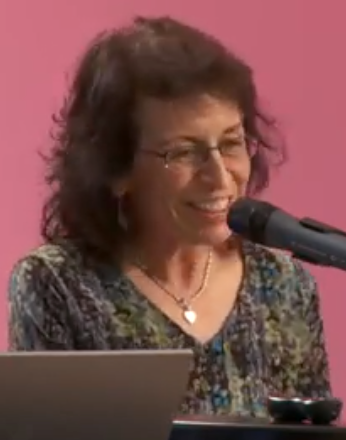
- Reading at the San Francisco Public Library in 2017
- Born: New Mexico
- Education: University of California, Davis; University of Wisconsin–Madison (PhD)
- Writing career
- Notable awards: Lambda Literary Award for Anthology (1991)

Carla (Mari) Trujillo is an American fiction writer, noted for her first novel What Night Brings, about the cultural contradictions of a Chicana lesbian growing up in a Catholic home. She is an administrator at the University of California, Berkeley, and has taught courses in Women's Studies.

== Early life ==
Trujillo was born in New Mexico, and lived there for several years before moving to Northern California. There, her grandmother ran a grocery store in the town of Las Vegas where Trujillo spent many days as a child playing. Trujillo would later use these early memories as inspiration for her works such as Faith and Fat Chances and Dogtown which both carry messages about class struggle and the impact of gentrification. Her grandmother's store was eventually claimed as eminent domain and paved over to make way for a highway, which meant the loss of income she used to support her seven children.

As an adult, Trujillo still prioritizes annual visits to New Mexico; in an interview about her book Faith and Fat Chances, Trujillo observed, "I feel very connected to the land, to the people and the spirit of the country...It's always been a part of my life."

== Career ==
Trujillo studied human development at the University of California, Davis. After earning her Bachelor's degree, she went on to graduate school at the University of Wisconsin, Madison, where she earned her PhD in Education Psychology. It was during her time in graduate school that her writing became an integral part of her daily life. She eventually moved to Berkeley, California, where she is currently an administrator at the University of California, Berkeley. She has lectured on Ethnic Studies, both at U.C. Berkeley and also Mills College in Oakland, California. She has also taught courses in Women's Studies at San Francisco State University. She is the former Director of the Graduate Diversity Program at U.C. Berkeley. In 2003, Trujillo authored her first novel entitled What Night Brings and published it with Curbstone Press. What Night Brings focuses on the Chicana lesbian character, Marci Cruz, and her upbringing in a conservative Catholic home in 1960s Northern California. Through the fictionalized account of Cruz, Trujillo questions issues of patriarchy and homophobia within Chicana/o culture.

== Editorial work ==
In 1991, Trujillo embarked on editing for Chicana Lesbians: The Girls Our Mothers Warned Us About, an anthology of poems, interviews, essays, short stories and personal testimonials written by Chicana lesbian writers and divided into four thematic sections: The life, The desire, The color, and The struggle . Out of the 44 literary pieces within, Trujillo included one of her essays titled Chicana Lesbians: Fear and Loathing in the Chicano Community. Her inspiration for editing Chicana Lesbians came from the work of other anthologies; Trujillo noted that reading Juanita Ramos's Compañeras: Latina Lesbians motivated her to expand upon the knowledge of Chicana Lesbian experiences. As she later explained in the introduction of Chicana Lesbians, she "wanted to see more about the intricacies and specifics of lesbianism and our culture," for her this meant incorporating writings which discussed issues such as racism and familial rejection of identity. Chicana Lesbians would later be awarded with the Lambda Literary Award for Best Lesbian Anthology.

=== Book cover symbolism ===
Both book covers were chosen by Trujillo to represent the point and themes of the anthology. There are two main covers for the book. The first presents Ester Hernández's 1990 La ofrenda, a fine art print that illustrates a brown woman with a buzzed mohawk, a sharp dagger earring, and her body facing away from the viewer to show her Virgen de Guadalupe back tattoo. In the illustration, a similarly brown hand offers a pink rose to the woman. La Virgen de Guadalupe was utilized as a primary symbol of the 1960s-1970s Chicano movement, derived from Mexican-Catholic imagery and championing working-class ethnic-nationalist sentiments. According to Macias and Gonzalez, the choice to use artwork depicting La Virgen as a tattoo on an assumedly Mexican woman breaking traditional gender presentation illustrates the convergence of seemingly divergent identity in the book: "Chicanas could be lesbians; lesbians could be Chicanas." However, the book majorly publicized Hernández's work and she received severe harassment for it, so Hernández requested that any further reprints of the book use a different artist. The second cover for the book, chosen to respect Hernández's wishes, presents Yan María Castro's MIS KA'AN Ú or Clarida den el horizonte cuando empiza a salir la luna. The art print illustrates two women in a golden-amber color scheme with headdresses reminiscent of Mayan head pieces, hands hovering around each other's erogenous zones.

=== Background ===
The publication of Chicana Lesbians was heavily influenced by the Chicana/o studies discourse of the time. In the 1980s-2000s, Chicano ethnic-nationalist movements were widespread, and Chicana feminism was progressing quickly into its own sector of the academic sphere. This resulted in the establishment of academic conferences centered around these movements, one of importance being the National Association for Chicano Studies conference in 1990. The conflict at this conference created the context from which Chicana Lesbians would be published. During the conference, there was a first-of-its-kind panel focusing on sexuality and homophobia, which was reacted to with multilayered hostility. Chicana feminism was already suppressed in Chicano studies spaces for its "disloyalty to Chicano culture," but Chicana lesbianism was especially erased in Chicano studies discourse, and the panel utilized Chicana feminist theory to approach the topic of homosexuality in Mexican American culture. The publication of Chicana Lesbians acted as a vehicle for authentic representations of Mexican American lesbian women to be made visible in academic spaces where they had once been largely erased and suppressed.

In 1997, she edited and published Living Chicana Theory, a collection of works addressing Chicana subjectivity. The variety of works included in the anthology ranged from theoretical to more artistic forms of critique; some notable contributors included Teresa Córdova, Gloria Anzaldúa, and Antonia Castañeda. The anthology interrogates the presence of coloniality in the academy as well as Chicanx culture at large, and explores meanings of identity construction in Chicana lives.

== Awards ==
- Lambda Literary Award for Best Lesbian Anthology for Chicana Lesbians: The Girls Our Mothers Warned Us About (1991, won - editor)
- PEN Bellwether Prize for Faith and Fat Chances (2012 - Finalist)

== Bibliography ==
- What Night Brings (2003)
- Faith and Fat Chances (2015)

=== As editor ===
- Chicana Lesbians: The Girls Our Mothers Warned Us About (1991)
- Living Chicana Theory (1997)
