= Jess Wells =

American author of historical and magical realism fiction

Jess Wells (born 1955) is an American author of modern realism, historical fiction and magical realism. She has blogged on under-represented women in history and feminist topics. Wells participated in the foundational years of lesbian and feminist publishing during the time of second-wave feminism in the 1980s and 1990s.

== Career ==
Wells participated in the foundational years of lesbian and feminist publishing during the time of second-wave feminism in the 1980 and 1990s beginning with an article in Spare Rib magazine on the history of prostitution, which she subsequently published as a book with Shameless Hussy Press in 1982 as A Herstory (sic) of Prostitution in Western Europe. She self-published her short stories under the name of Library B Books until selling her novels to small press publishers.

Her short stories have appeared in more than four dozen anthologies and journals, including those from the University of Wisconsin Press, Alyson Books, Firebrand Books, Arsenal Pulp Press, Simon & Schuster, Papier Mache Press, Harrington Park Press, Wising Up Press New Millennium Writings, Owen Wister Review and Chronicle Books. She is included in the Encyclopedia of Science Fiction, Lesbian Culture: An Anthology, The Encyclopedia of Contemporary LGBT Literature, and All the Rage: The Story of Gay Visibility in America.

Wells edited several anthologies including Lesbians Raising Sons (Alyson Publications, 1997), and HomeFronts: Controversies in the Non-traditional Parenting Community (Alyson Books, 2000), addressing the stereotypes and social pressure on lesbian and gay families, both of which were finalists for the Lambda Literary Award. She also edited several volumes of lesbian erotica, as well as producing her own volume of lesbian erotica, The Price of Passion (Firebrand Books, 1999).

In 2007, Wells produced her first piece of historical fiction, The Mandrake Broom, (Firebrand Books, 2007) which dramatizes the fight to save medical knowledge during the witch-burning times in Europe 1465-1540. This novel imagines a group of women carrying the work of Trotula to midwives and healers throughout Europe and includes as characters the authors of the Malleus Maleficarum and the scientist Paracelsus. It was re-issued as The Mandrake Broom: When the Witches Fought Back, (Mirador Publishing, 2022).

A Slender Tether, (Fireship Press, 2013) imagines the early years of Christine de Pizan, an intellectual of the Middle Ages and arguably Europe’s first feminist. It is a novel in three linked stories and ponders questions of ambition, disillusionment, and identity.

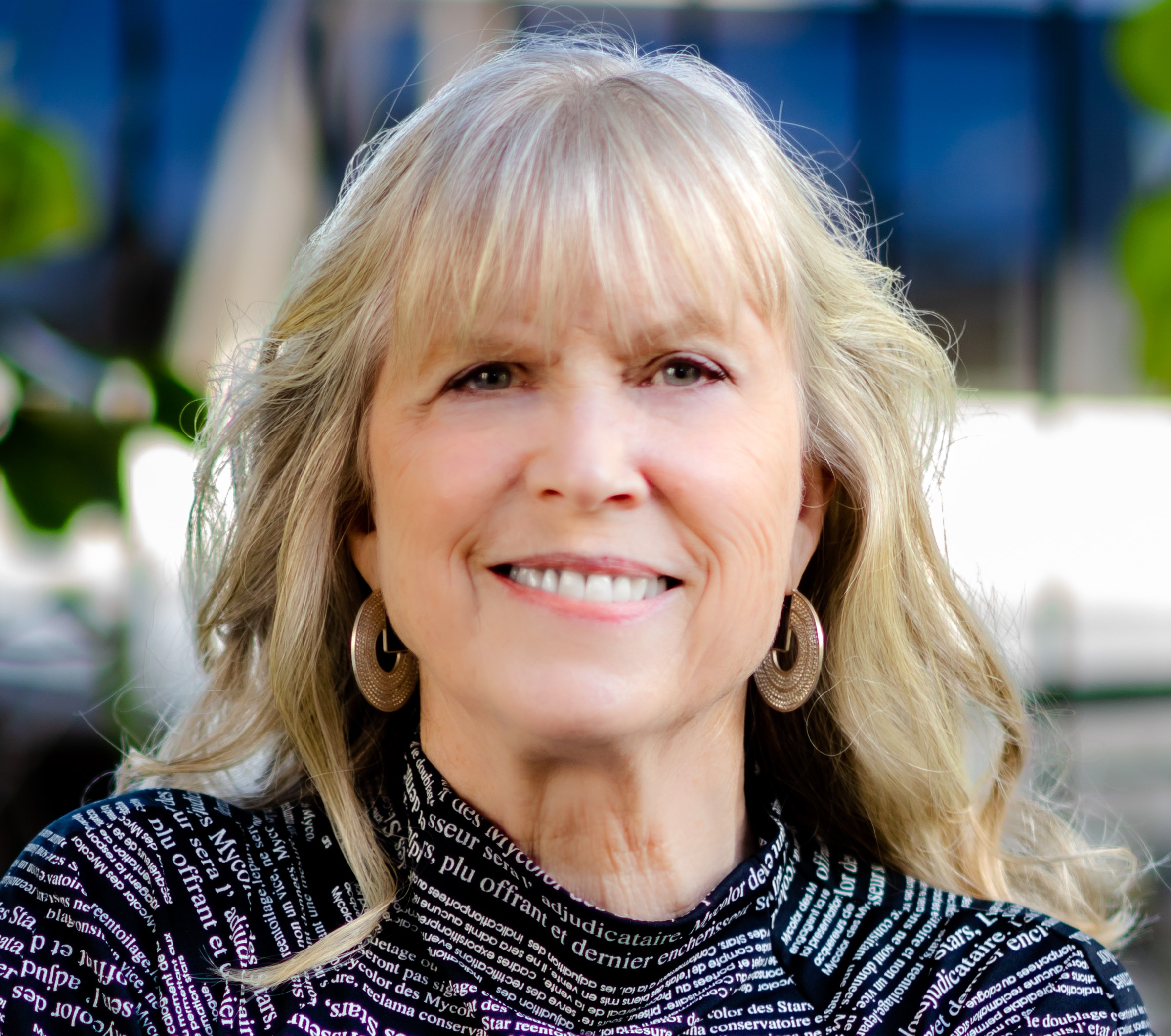
Jess Wells, American author

Straight Uphill: A Tale of Love and Chocolate (Cortero/Fireship Press, 2020), imagines five generations of women chocolatiers in a small Italian village, including their travails WWI and WWII, and the introduction of chocolate into Italy in the 1500s.

Jaguar Paloma and the Caketown Bar (Mirador Publishing, 2021) is a volume of magical realism set in a southern jungle, where a woman who effects the weather and her friend with extraordinary beauty establish a trading post for cast-off women and the dispossessed.

Dancing Through a Deluge (Mirador Publishing, 2024) imagines a post-plague world in England, 1351, when a lapsed nun struggles to free peasants and survive an epic flood.

== Awards and recognition ==
- 2024: Finalist in Historical Fiction for Foreword Reviews INDIES Award.
- 2022: Silver Medal Nautilus Book Award for Small Press Fiction
- 2020: Bronze Winner for Adult Fiction/Romance for Foreword Reviews INDIES Award
- 2009: Saints and Sinners Literary Festival Hall of Fame
- 2008: Finalist for Lambda Literary Award in Women’s Fiction for The Mandrake Broom
- 2007: San Francisco Arts Commission Grant for Literature
- 2001: Finalist for Lambda Literary Award for Love Shook My Heart II
- 2000: Finalist for Lambda Literary Award for Home Fronts: Controversies in the Non-Traditional Parenting Community
- 1997: Finalist for Lambda Literary Award for Lesbians Raising Sons
- 1986: Excellence in Journalism, Lebhar-Friedman Publishing

== Bibliography ==
- Dancing Through a Deluge, (Mirador Publishing, October, 2024)
- The Mandrake Broom: When the Witches Fought Back, (Mirador Publishing, August, 2022)
- Jaguar Paloma and the Caketown Bar, (Mirador Publishing, September 2021)
- Straight Uphill: A Tale of Love and Chocolate, (Cortero/Fireship Press, February 2020)
- The Disappearing Andersons of Loon Lake (Audio book of short stories, Library B Books, June 2017)
- A Slender Tether, (Fireship Press, 2013)
- The Mandrake Broom, (Firebrand Books, 2007)
- The Price of Passion (Firebrand Books, 1999)
- AfterShocks, Triangle Classic (InsightOut Books, 1992)
- AfterShocks, British edition (The Women's Press, London, 1993)
- AfterShocks, (Third Side Press, 1992)
- Two Willow Chairs (Library B Books, 1987)
- The Dress/The Sharda Stories (reprint Library B Books, 1986)
- The Dress, The Cry and a Shirt with No Seams, (Library B Books, 1984)
- The Sharda Stories, (Library B Books, 1982)
- A Herstory of Prostitution in Western Europe, (Shameless Hussy Press, 1982)
- Run, (Library B Books, 1981)
