= Terry Wolverton =

American novelist, memoirist, poet, and editor (born 1954)

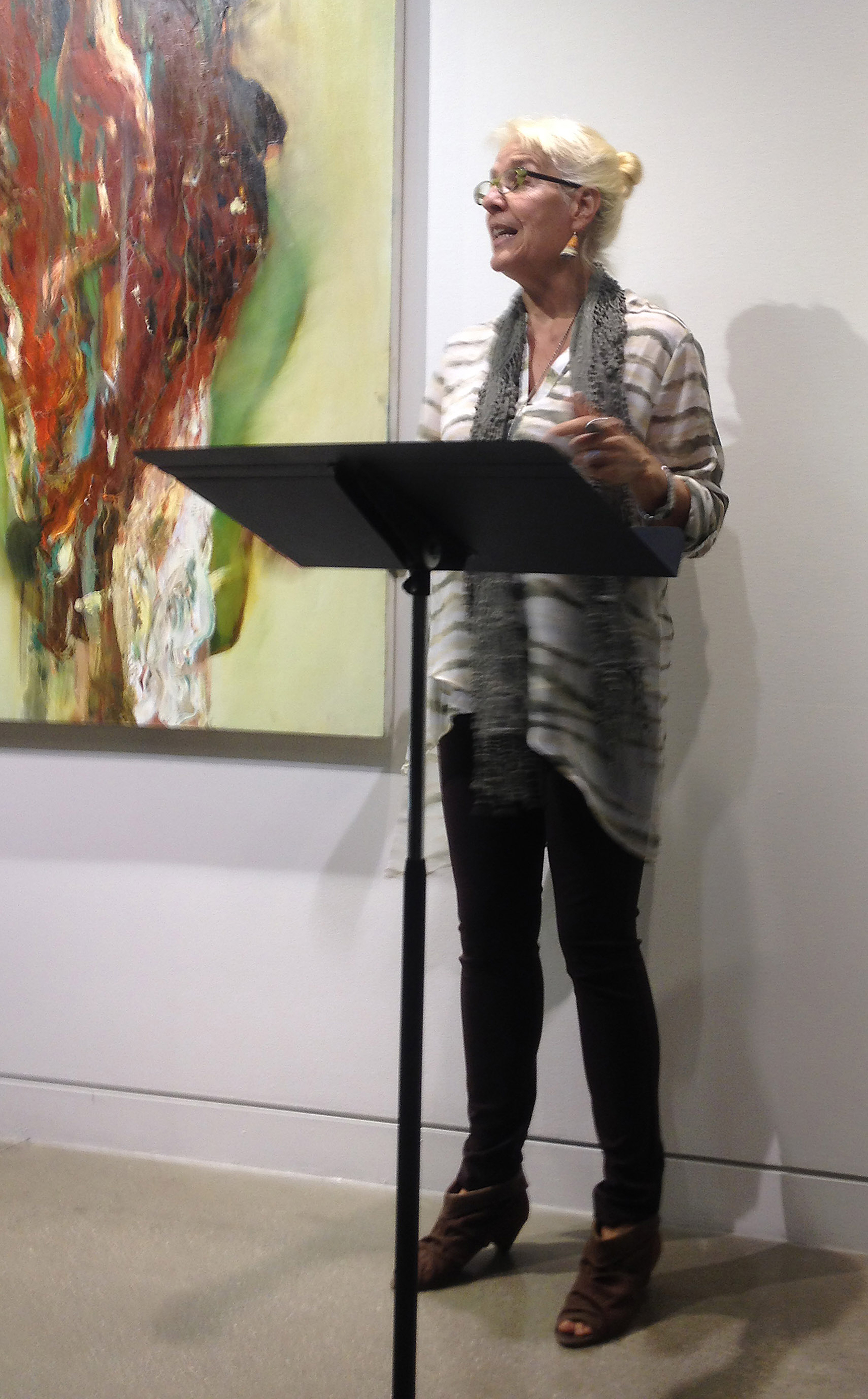
- Terry Wolverton reading with Writers At Work at Art Institute of California, Hollywood, for LitCrawl. Los Angeles, 2016.
- Born: August 23, 1954 (age 72); Cocoa Beach, Florida, U.S.
- Education: University of Detroit; University of Toronto; Thomas Jefferson College
- Occupations: Writer; Editor; Writing instructor
- Spouse: Yvonne M. Estrada
- Writing career
- Genres: Poetry; Fiction; Creative nonfiction
- Notable works: Insurgent Muse: life and art at the Woman’s Building; Embers
- Movements: Feminist, LGBTQ
- Website: terrywolverton.net

Terry Wolverton (born 1954) is an American novelist, memoirist, poet, and editor. Her memoir Insurgent Muse: Life and Art at the Woman's Building, published in 2002 by City Lights Books, was named one of the "Best Books of 2002" by the Los Angeles Times, and was the winner of the 2003 Publishing Triangle Judy Grahn Award, and a finalist for the Lambda Literary Award. Her novel-in-poems Embers was a finalist for the PEN USA Litfest Poetry Award and the Lambda Literary Award.

== Early years ==
Born August 23, 1954, in Cocoa Beach, Florida, Wolverton grew up in Detroit, Michigan. Her grandmother, Elsba Mae Miller, a former English teacher, would often read and recite poetry to her, and Wolverton credits this for inspiring her love of language. Even as a child Wolverton was interested in the arts, especially writing, music, and drama; she graduated from the Performing Arts curriculum of Cass Technical High School in 1972.

== Education ==
Wolverton graduated from the Performing Arts curriculum of Cass Technical High School in 1972, after which she attended the University of Detroit as a student in its Bachelor of Fine Arts Theatre program. In 1973, she transferred to the University of Toronto, majoring in Theatre, Psychology, and Women's Studies. In 1975, Wolverton participated in Sagaris, an independent institute for the study of feminist political theory. She ultimately received a Bachelor of Philosophy degree in Creative Writing and Theater from Thomas Jefferson College, an experimental school based at Grand Valley State Colleges in Western Michigan, where she participated in its feminist Women, World, and Wonder program.

Wolverton also received a certificate from the Feminist Studio Workshop in Los Angeles and is a certified Kundalini yoga and meditation instructor.

== Career ==
Wolverton moved to Los Angeles in 1976, enrolling in the Feminist Studio Workshop at the Woman's Building. She spent the next thirteen years at the Woman's Building where, in addition to writing and performing, she was also instrumental in the Lesbian Art Project, the Incest Awareness Project, the Great American Lesbian Art Show (GALAS), a year-long performance project called "An Oral Herstory of Lesbianism", and a White Women's Anti-Racism Consciousness-Raising Group. From 1987 to 1988, she served as the nonprofit organization's Executive Director.

Wolverton has taught performance skills and creative writing since 1977. In 1986, she developed the Visions and Revisions Writing Program at Connexxus Women's Center/Centro de Mujeres. In 1988, she launched the Perspectives Writing Program at the Los Angeles Gay and Lesbian Center, where she taught until 1997. One notable writer that attended these workshops was Gil Cuadros, a Mexican American poet who was diagnosed with AIDS in 1987. Cuadros started attending her writing workshops for people with HIV. As a result of his participation, Cuadros published his collection of poetry and fiction, City of God(1994).

In 1997, Wolverton founded Writers at Work, a creative writing center where she continues to teach fiction, creative nonfiction, and poetry, and to provide creative consultations to writers.

In 2007, Wolverton co-founded The Future of Publishing Think Tank, which convened writers, publishers, booksellers and publicists to consider new models for reaching readers. The Think Tank held discussions, offered workshops, conducted reader surveys, and compiled an online directory of literary resources in Los Angeles County.

The same year, she became an affiliate faculty member in the Master of Fine Arts writing program at Antioch University, where she currently works.

== Awards ==
Year	Work	Award	Result	Ref.
1992	Indivisible: New Short Fiction by West Coast Gay and Lesbian Writers, with Robert Drake	Lambda Literary Award for Anthology	Finalist	
1993	Black Slip	Lambda Literary Award for Lesbian Poetry	Finalist	
1997	Bailey's Beads	Stonewall Literature Award	Finalist	
1998	His 2, with Robert Drake	Lambda Literary Award for Anthology	Winner	
2000	His 3, with Robert Drake	Lambda Literary Award for Anthology	Finalist	
2000	Hers 3, with Robert Drake	Lambda Literary Award for Anthology	Finalist	
2001	Circa 2000: Lesbian Fiction at the Millenium, with Robert Drake	Lambda Literary Award for Anthology	Finalist	
2003	Insurgent Muse: Life and Art at the Women’s Building	Lambda Literary Award for Lesbian Memoir or Biography	Finalist	
2003	Insurgent Muse: Life and Art at the Women’s Building	Judy Grahn Award for Lesbian Nonfiction	Winner	
2004	Embers	Lambda Literary Award for Lesbian Poetry	Finalist	
2006	Wounded World: lyric essays about our spiritual disquiet	City of Los Angeles (COLA) Artists’ Fellowship, Creative Writing	Winner	
2011	Stealing Angel	Golden Crown Literary Society (Goldie)	Finalist	
2020	"For eradicating homophobia"	Monette-Horwitz Trust Award	Awardee	

== Bibliography ==
Author

- Black Slip, Clothespin Fever Press, 1992, ISBN 1878533053 (poetry)
- Bailey's Beads, Faber & Faber, 1996, ISBN 9780571198917 (novel)
- Mystery Bruise, Red Hen Press, 1999, ISBN 9781888996142 (poetry)
- Insurgent Muse: Life and Art at the Woman's Building, City Lights Books, 2002. ISBN 9780872864030 (memoir)
- Terry Wolverton Greatest Hits., Pudding House Publications, 2002, ISBN 9781589980631 (poetry)
- Embers: A Novel in Poems, Red Hen Press, 2003, ISBN 9781888996722
- Shadow and Praise, Main Street Rag Publishing Company, 2007, ISBN 9781599480572 (poetry)
- The Labrys Reunion, Spinsters Ink, 2009, ISBN 9781935226024 (novel)
- Breath and other stories, Silverton Books, 2012, ISBN 9780962952869(novel)
- Stealing Angel, Spinsters Ink, 2009, ISBN 9781935226451(novel)
- Wounded World: lyric essays about our spiritual disquiet, with photographs by Yvonne M. Estrada, Create Space Independent Publishing, 2013 ISBN 1481027905 (essays)
- Ruin Porn, Finishing Line Press, 2017, ISBN 9781635343625 (poetry)
- Blue Hunger, Finishing Line Press, 2018, ISBN 9781635347548 (poetry)

Editor

- Blood Whispers: L. A. Writers on AIDS, Silverton Books (vol 1, 1991, ISBN 096295280X; vol 2, 1994, ISBN 0962952818)
- Catena: poem series by member of the Women's Poetry Project, Silverton Books, 2003, ISBN 0962952842 (poetry)
- Mischief, Caprice, and Other Poetic Strategies, Red Hen Press, 2004, ISBN 9781888996173(poetry)
- Bird Float, Tree Song: disarticulated poems by Los Angeles poets, Silverton Books, 2017, ISBN 9780997314908 (poetry)

Edited with Benjamin Weissman

- Harbinger, Los Angeles Festival and Beyond Baroque, 1991, ISBN 09627548-0-3 (poetry and fiction)

Edited with Robert Drake

- Indivisible: New Short Fiction by West Coast Gay and Lesbian Writers Plume Books 1991, ISBN 0452266769
- Hers: Brilliant New Fiction by Lesbian Writers Faber & Faber Incorporated, 1995, ISBN 0571198678
- His: Brilliant New Fiction by Gay Writers Faber & Faber Incorporated, 1995, ISBN 057119866X
- Hers 2 and His 2 Faber & Faber, Incorporated, 1997, ISBN 9780571199099
- Hers 3 and His 3 Faber & Faber, Incorporated, 1999, ISBN 9780571199631
- Circa 2000: Gay Fiction at the Millennium Alyson Books, 2000, ISBN 1555835171
- Circa 2000: Lesbian Fiction at the Millennium Alyson Books 2000, ISBN 155583518X

Edited with Sondra Hale

- From Site to Vision: the Woman's Building in Contemporary Culture, Otis College of Art and Design, 2011, ISBN 0930209230

Scripts and Performance Art Texts

- Embers, theatrical adaptation of novel-in-poems, concert reading, Grand Performances, Los Angeles, CA. 2011
- Embers, theatrical adaptation of novel-in-poems, workshop production, Los Angeles Central Library, 2009
- "Cover Story," collaboration with choreographer Heidi Duckler/Collage Dance Theater, 2002
- "After Eden," collaboration with choreographer Heidi Duckler/Collage Dance Theater, 2001
- "Under Eden," collaboration with choreographer Heidi Duckler/Collage Dance Theater, 2001
- "Sub Versions," collaboration with choreographer Heidi Duckler/Collage Dance Theater, 2000
- Treatment for Rapunzel, animated feature film, Walt Disney Company, 1997
- Poetry segments for Destination Anywhere, a short film/music video directed by Mark Pellington, starring Jon Bon Jovi and Demi Moore, Mercury Records, First broadcast on MTV, June 17, 1997.
- Treatment for The Snow Queen, animated feature film, Walt Disney Company, 1993.
- Treatment for Anna, animated feature film, Walt Disney Company. 1993.
- Green, full-length feature film, not produced. 1990.
- "Meditations," text for "Broken," dance performance choreographed by Rose Polsky, premiered Los Angeles Theater Center. 1990.
- A Merry Little Christmas, three-act play, staged reading produced at Celebration Theater. 1987.
- dis-a-buse: to free from a misconception or delusion, performance text co-written with Catherine Stifter, produced at the Woman's Building. 1986.
- Familiar, performance text produced at the Social & Public Art Resource Center, 1984.
- Me and My Shadow, performance text, produced at ABC No Rio; Sushi Gallery, UCLA, the Woman's Building. 1984.
- Medium: Memory/Muse, performance text, produced at Long Beach Museum of Art. 1983.
- "Ya Got Class, Real Class," performance text co-written with Vicki Stolsen, produced at Los Angeles Contemporary Exhibitions, 1980.
- "In Silence Secrets Turn to Lies/Secrets Shared Become Sacred Truth," performance text, produced at the Woman's Building as part of the Incest Awareness Project. 1979.
