= Assotto Saint =

Haitian-born American poet, publisher and performance artist (1957–1994)

- Born: Yves François Lubin; October 2, 1957; Les Cayes, Haiti
- Died: June 29, 1994 (aged 36); New York City
- Occupations: Poet, performance artist
- Spouse: Jan Holmgren
- Writing career
- Period: 1980s

Assotto Saint (October 2, 1957 - June 29, 1994) was a Haitian-born American poet, publisher and performance artist, who was a key figure in LGBT and African-American art and literary culture of the 1980s and early 1990s.

== Background ==
Saint was born in Les Cayes, Haiti, on October 2, 1957, as Yves François Lubin. He moved to New York City in 1970, enrolling briefly in a pre-med program at Queens College, but soon dropped out to pursue his artistic interests. He adopted the name Assotto Saint around this time, choosing Assotto for a ceremonial drum used in Haitian Vodou rituals and Saint for Haitian revolutionary leader Toussaint L'Ouverture.

== Artistic career ==
His early interest in the performative and aesthetic aspects of Catholic mass in his hometown of Les Cayes grew into a love of theater and performance. He participated in school productions at Jamaica High School in Queens, where he graduated in 1974.

He performed from 1973 to 1980 as a dancer with the Martha Graham Dance Company but stopped after an injury prevented his further participation. In November 1980, he met Jan Holmgren, a Swedish-born musician and composer who would become both his life partner and a collaborator in his artistic work.

With Holmgren, Saint founded a theatre company, Metamorphosis Theatre, and an electronic pop music group, Xotika. With Metamorphosis, Saint performed theatrical pieces including Risin' to the Love We Need, New Love Song, Black Fag and Nuclear Lovers. Risin' to the Love We Need won second prize from the Jane Chambers Award for Gay and Lesbian Playwriting in 1980. After becoming a citizen in 1986, Saint wrote in an autobiographical piece, "The Impossible Black Homosexual (OR Fifty Ways to Become One)," that he is the "one who on the day he naturalized as an American citizen sat naked on the current president's picture & after he was finished called the performance 'bushshit'".

During this era, he began publishing poetry in anthologies such as In the Life: A Black Gay Anthology (1986, edited by Joseph Beam) and Gay and Lesbian Poetry in Our Time (1988, edited by Carl Morse and Joan Larkin), and in his own chapbook, Triple Trouble (1987). He was a participant in the black gay writer's collective Other Countries and was also a poetry editor for the anthology Other Countries: Black Gay Voices in 1988, and founded Galiens Press to publish work by black gay poets. Titles published by Galiens included the anthologies The Road Before Us: 100 Gay Black Poets (1991), Here to Dare: A Collection of Ten Gay Black Poets (1992) and Milking Black Bull: 11 Black Gay Poets (1995), as well as Saint's own poetry collections Stations (1989) and Wishing for Wings (1994).

He was also a mentor to other emerging LGBT African American cultural figures of the era, including Essex Hemphill, Marlon Riggs and Melvin Dixon.

He won a Lambda Literary Award in the Gay Poetry category at the 4th Lambda Literary Awards as editor of The Road Before Us. He was also a nominee in the Gay Anthology category at the 5th Lambda Literary Awards for Here to Dare, and in the Gay Poetry category at the 7th Lambda Literary Awards for Wishing for Wings. In 1990 he was awarded a fellowship in poetry from the New York Foundation for the Arts, and received the Black Gay and Lesbian Leadership Forum's James Baldwin Award.

After Saint and Holmgren were diagnosed HIV-positive, Saint became an AIDS activist, including appearing in Riggs' 1993 film No Regrets (Non, Je Regrette Rien). He was one of the first African American activists to publicly disclose his HIV status. Holmgren died on March 29, 1993, and Saint died on June 29, 1994. Holmgren and Saint are buried alongside each other at Cemetery of the Evergreens, Brooklyn, New York.

A posthumous book which blended an autobiography with an anthology of his published writings, Spells of a Voodoo Doll: The Poems, Fiction, Essays and Plays of Assotto Saint, was published in 1996. That book was a Lambda nominee in the Gay Biography or Autobiography category at the 9th Lambda Literary Awards.

Many of Saint's personal papers, including professional and personal correspondence from friends and colleagues, are held by the New York Public Library at the Schomburg Center for Research in Black Culture.

== Works ==
=== as editor ===
- The Road Before Us: 100 Gay Black Poets (1991)
- Here to Dare: 10 Gay Black Poets (1992)
- Milking Black Bull: 11 Gay Black Poets (1995)

=== as writer ===
- Triple Trouble (1987)
- Stations (1989)
- Wishing for Wings (1994)
- Spells of a Voodoo Doll: The Poems, Fiction, Essays and Plays of Assotto Saint (1996)
