= Peter Burton (writer) =

English journalist

Peter William Burton (29 April 1945 – 7 November 2011) was an English journalist, publisher, editor and author, considered "the Godfather of gay journalism".

== Career ==
After dropping out of school at age 15, Burton took a position at the publicity department of Hamish Hamilton.

On 23 September 1965, Burton wrote his first piece of journalism, a review of The Marriage of Mr Mississippi.

From 1966 to 1968, Burton served as a manager at Le Duce in Soho, a basement gay bar that operated despite homosexuality being illegal at the time.

In the late 1960s, Burton wrote and edited British gay news outlets, including Spartacus and Jeremy. He explained that at the time, "[T]here was no gay press and although there were plenty of gay journalists, there was no gay journalism ... Those of us who were involved from the very beginning had to find our material and learn to write about it in a style our readers would not have previously encountered."

In 1968, Burton began working with Robin Maugham, helping him complete a number of books, including Conversations with Willie, which Burton is said to have written in total.

He began writing for Gay News in 1973 and in 1976, became the company's literary editor. During this time, Gay News published James Kirkup's poem "The Love That Dares to Speak Its Name", which led Mary Whitehouse, a social conservative, to sue the newspaper, resulting in the Whitehouse v. Lemon trial for blasphemous libel. Whitehouse won the suit, and Gay News's founding editor, Denis Lemon, "was sentenced to nine months suspended imprisonment and fined £500". Gay News was fined £1,000. Lemon later referred to Burton as "the Godfather of gay journalism".

During the 1970s, Burton worked for Rod Stewart's manager, Billy Gaff, and handled the American Press for Stewart's tour with Faces, after which Burton published his first book, Rod Stewart: A Life on the Town, in 1977.

After Gay News ceased publication in 1983, Burton became the literary and features editor of Gay Times, a position he held until 2003.

In the 2000s, Burton regularly contributed to Brighton-based publications 360 and One80, as well as to the Daily Express, and The Independent. Beginning in 2006, he was also a literary programmer of Brighton's Clifton Montpelier Powis Festival.

== Personal life ==
Burton was born 29 April 1945 in Hackney, London.

In his first memoir, Parallel Lives, published in 1985, Burton wrote, "From about the age of 13, I had two ambitions: to leave school, and to leave home. Both were accomplished before I was 16 – and essentially, since then, I have been master of my own fate. And things have happened."

He was aware he was homosexual in his teens and shortly after began visiting gay pubs in London's West End. Although homosexuality was illegal at the time, Burton said he never worried about whether his sexuality was "'right' or 'wrong' – because it seemed perfectly natural." He continued, noting, "[B]y the time I had become aware of society and the law’s attitudes, it was too late for me to change mine.”

Burton died of a heart attack at age 66 on 7 November 2011 in Brighton. Though Burton's "partner Ian predeceased him", he was "survived by his sister Pamela Hinchcliffe and her sons, [and] his close companion, Torsten Højer".

== Awards ==
Awards and honors for Burton's writing
Year	Title	Award/Honor	Result	Ref.
1998	The Mammoth Book of Gay Short Stories	Lambda Literary Award for Anthology (Fiction)	Finalist	
2003	Bend Sinister: The Gay Times Book of Disturbing Stories	Lambda Literary Award for Anthology (Fiction)	Finalist	
2005	Serendipity: The Gay Times Book of New Stories	Lambda Literary Award for Anthology (Fiction)	Finalist	
2009	A Casualty of War: Gay Short Fiction	Lambda Literary Award for Anthology	Finalist	

== Publications ==
- Rod Stewart: A Life on the Town (1977)
- Parallel Lives (1985)
- Talking To--: Peter Burton in Conversation with ... Writers Writing on Gay Themes (1991)
- Amongst the Aliens: Some Aspects of a Gay Life (1995)
- Somerset Maugham (2000)

=== Anthologies edited ===
- Vale of Tears (1992)
- The Mammoth Book of Gay Short Stories (1997)
- Bend Sinister: The Gay Times Book of Disturbing Stories (2002)
- Death Comes Easy: The Gay Times Book of Murder Stories (2003)
- Serendipity: The Gay Times Book of New Stories (2004)
- A Casualty of War: The Arcadia Book of Gay Short Stories (2008)
- What Love Is: The Second Arcadia Book of Gay Short Stories (2011)

=== Anthology contributions ===
- On the Line: New Gay Fiction, edited by Ian Young (1981)
- Play Hard, Score Big, edited by John Patrick (1999)
