= George Stambolian =

American poet (1938–1991)

- Born: April 10, 1938; Bridgeport, Connecticut, US
- Died: December 22, 1991 (aged 53); New York City, US
- Occupation: Professor of French
- Known for: Editor of the Men on Men anthologies
- Partner: Michael Hampton

George Stambolian (born April 10, 1938 – December 22, 1991, New York City) was an American educator, writer, and editor of Armenian descent. Stambolian was a key figure in the early gay literary movement that came out of New York during the 1960s and 1970s. He was best known as the editor of the Men on Men anthologies of gay fiction.

Stambolian graduated from Dartmouth College and carried out graduate studies at the University of Wisconsin, earning a Ph.D. in 1969 with a dissertation that was subsequently published as Marcel Proust and the Creative Encounter (1972). From 1966 until his retirement in 1991, Stambolian was a professor in the Department of French at Wellesley College, where he taught courses on French language and literature. He wrote and edited Twentieth Century French Fiction: Essays for Germaine Brée (1975) and, with Elaine Marks, Homosexualities and French Literature (1979).

Men on Men: Best New Fiction, edited by Stambolian and including an introduction he wrote, was published by New American Library (Plume) in 1986. The anthology featured the work of some prominent gay authors of that period as well as others less well established. The critical acclaim accorded this volume and its popular success led to the publication of three sequels which Stambolian likewise edited and introduced. He was awarded the 1990 Lambda Literary Award in the category Gay Men's Anthologies for editing Men on Men 3. The fourth of these anthologies was released after his death in December 1991 from complications of AIDS at the age of 53.

Stambolian's parents were Armenian immigrants, and he explored his Armenian heritage in a short story entitled "In My Father's Car" in the third volume of Men on Men. He inspired the gay Armenian American character in Armistead Maupin's Maybe the Moon.
