= Irene Zahava =

Editor

Irene Zahava is known for editing short story collections relating to women and lesbians. Her works have been finalists for the Lambda Literary Award for Anthology three times: Lesbian Love Stories (1990), Speaking Four Ourselves (1991), and Lavender Mansions (1995).

== Books ==
- Zahava, Irene, ed. (1986). Hear the Silence: Stories by Women of Myth, Magic and Renewal. Crossing Press. ISBN 978-0-89594-211-1.
- Zahava, Irene, ed. (1988). Love, Struggle and Change: Stories by Women. Crossing Press. ISBN 978-0-89594-263-0.
- Zahava, Irene, ed. (1988). Through Other Eyes: Animal Stories by Women. Crossing Press. ISBN 978-0-89594-314-9.
- Zahava, Irene, ed. (1988). The WomanSleuth Anthology: Contemporary Mystery Stories by Women. Crossing Press. ISBN 978-0-895-94271-5.
- Zahava, Irene, ed. (1989). Finding Courage: Writings by Women. Crossing Press. ISBN 978-0-89594-378-1.
- Zahava, Irene, ed. (1989). Lesbian Love Stories. Crossing Press. ISBN 978-0-895-94341-5.
- Zahava, Irene, ed. (1989). The Second Womansleuth Anthology: Contemporary Mystery Stories by Women. Crossing Press. ISBN 978-0-895-94368-2.
- Zahava, Irene, ed. (1990). My Father's Daughter: Stories. Crossing Press. ISBN 978-0-89594-424-5.
- Zahava, Irene, ed. (1990). My Mother's Daughter: Stories by Women. Crossing Press. ISBN 978-0-89594-464-1.
- Zahava, Irene, ed. (1990). Speaking for Ourselves: Short Stories by Jewish Lesbians. Crossing Press. ISBN 978-0-89594-428-3.
- Zahava, Irene, ed. (1990). The Third WomanSleuth Anthology: Contemporary Mystery Stories by Women. Crossing Press. ISBN 978-0-895-94413-9.
- Zahava, Irene, ed. (1990). Word of Mouth: 150 Short-Short Stories by 90 Women Writers. Crossing Press. ISBN 978-0-895-94395-8.
- Zahava, Irene, ed. (1991). Lesbian Love Stories. Vol. 2. Crossing Press. ISBN 978-0-89594-462-7.
- Zahava, Irene, ed. (1991). The Fourth Womansleuth Anthology: Contemporary Mystery Stories by Women. Crossing Press. ISBN 978-0-895-94521-1.
- Zahava, Irene, ed. (1992). Quickies: Lesbian Short-Shorts. Violet Ink. ISBN 978-0-963-16561-9.
- Zahava, Irene, ed. (1994). Lavender Mansions: 40 Contemporary Lesbian and Gay Short Stories. Westview Press. ISBN 978-0-813-32031-1.
- Zahava, Irene, ed. (1996). Feminism3: The Third Generation In Fiction. Westview Press. ISBN 978-0-813-32550-7.
- Zahava, Irene, ed. (1997). Love Shook My Heart: New Lesbian Love Stories. Alyson Publications. ISBN 978-1-555-83404-3.
