= Miah Jeffra =

American LGBTQ writer (born 1979)

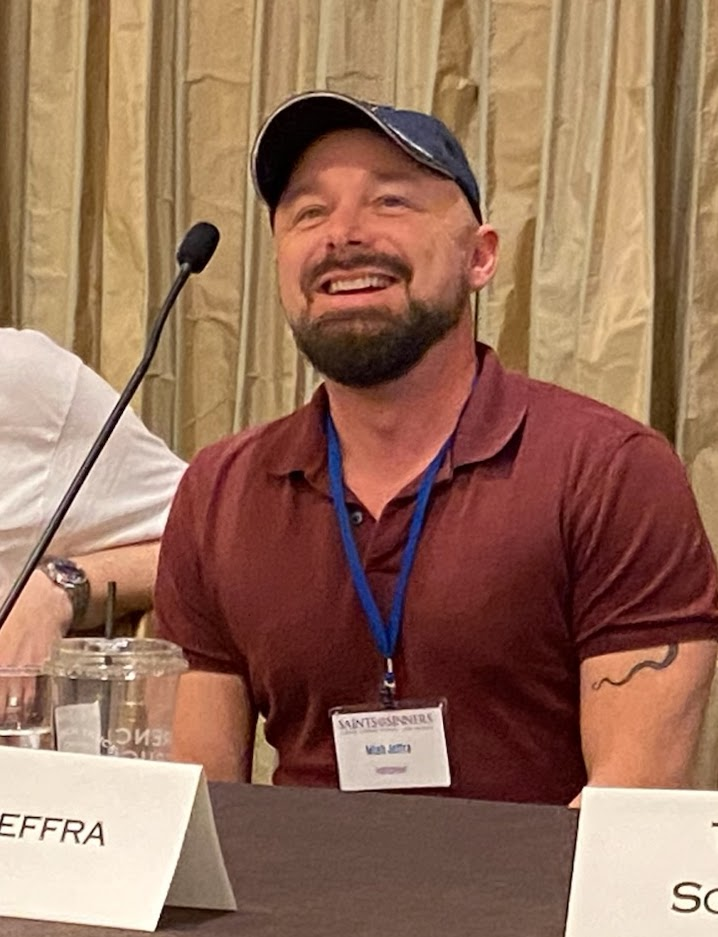
Jeffra at the Saints and Sinners Festival in 2025

Miah Jeffra {born 1979) is an American writer, best known for their novel American Gospel, finalist for the PEN/Hemingway Award, and their Grace Paley Prize-finalist short story collection, The Violence Almanac. Jeffra also is co-founder of Whiting Award-winning LGBTQ+ literary magazine, Foglifter.

== Early life and education ==
Jeffra was born in Oceanside, California, but, as a military brat, moved several times throughout their childhood and attended high school in Baltimore. They studied Humanities, Music, and performance at Oglethorpe University in Atlanta, Georgia, and later studied in the MFA Critical Studies program at the California Institute of the Arts and the MA program in English at San Francisco State University.

== Career ==
Jeffra's first book, a collection of essays, The First Church of What's Happening (Nomadic Press), was published in 2017. Their second book, a memoir in essays, The Fabulous Ekphrastic Fantastic! (Sibling Rivalry Press) released in 2020. In 2021, Jeffra released the story collection The Violence Almanac (Black Lawrence Press). The Violence Almanac received finalist nods for several awards, including the Grace Paley Prize, Robert C. Jones Book Award, Prairie Schooner Book Prize, Many Voices Project Prize, and the Santa Fe Writers Project Prize. Jeffra's debut novel, American Gospel (Black Lawrence Press) released in 2023, and was the finalist for the PEN/Hemingway Award for Debut Novel, as well as the Phillip McMath Award.

Jeffra has published fiction and creative nonfiction in several literary magazines, including StoryQuarterly, Prairie Schooner, North American Review, Epiphany, DIAGRAM and ANMLY. Their book reviews have appeared in San Francisco Chronicle, Tasteful Rude, The Rumpus,and Bay Area Reporter.

Jeffra won the New Millennium Fiction Prize in 2017.

With Chad Koch, Jeffra founded LGBTQ+ literary magazine Foglifter, in 2016. Foglifter has won the Whiting Award, contributors have won Pushcart Prizes, the PEN/Robert J Dau Short Story Prize, and nods for Best American Essays, among other accolades. Under the press imprint of Foglifter, Jeffra co-edited, with Arisa White and Monique Mero, the anthology Home is Where You Queer Your Heart (Foglifter 2021), which featured several acclaimed contemporary queer writers, including Kazim Ali, Alexis Pauline Gumbs, Sam Sax, Donika Kelly and Yanyi.

Jeffra was a principal organizer for the Bay Area segment of Writers Resist, an international network of literary artists and organizations responding to the election of Donald Trump in 2016.

Jeffra has curated art exhibitions, directed theatrical performances, choreographed dance shows, and collaborated on culture jamming projects.

Jeffra is Assistant Professor of English and creative writing at Santa Clara University and teaches in the MFA Writing program at University of San Francisco.

== Personal life ==
Jeffra is openly queer. They currently live in San Francisco with their husband, film producer Mark Milla.

== Books ==
- The First Church of What's Happening (2017)
- The Fabulous Ekphrastic Fantastic! (2020)
- The Violence Almanac (2021)
- Home is Where You Queer Your Heart (2021)
- American Gospel (2023)
