= New Millennium Writings =

American literary magazine

New Millennium Writings is an American literary magazine published in Knoxville, Tennessee. It is the second oldest literary magazine in Tennessee and has the largest circulation of any literary magazine in that state.

== History and profile ==
The magazine was established in 1996 by Don Williams, who is editor-in-chief. The magazine is published annually. It carries fiction, poetry, and creative non-fiction by up-and-coming writers.

The magazine is the recipient of a Golden Press Card Award for Excellence. It carries profiles, interviews and essays on famous writers, such as Cormac McCarthy, Joyce Carol Oates, John Updike, Ken Kesey, Sarah Cornwell and Shozan Jack Haubner. The Writer named New Millennium Writings the "breakthrough journal of the year" in 2008. Work that has appeared in the magazine has been republished in the O. Henry Prize Anthology, Best New Stories from the South and the Pushcart Prize collection.

The magazine hosts semi-annual contests in fiction, very short fiction, creative essays and poetry. Among past winners are Robert Clark Young, Laura S. Distelheim, Morgan McDermott, and Vivian Shipley.
