= Kris Kovick =

American writer, cartoonist and printer

- Born: September 10, 1951
- Died: October 26, 2001 (aged 50)
- Area: Cartoonist

Kris Kovick (September 10, 1951 – October 26, 2001) was an American writer, cartoonist, and printer based in California.

== Early years ==
Kovick was born in Fresno, California and attended California State University in the early 1970s. She moved to Seattle for five years, and then settled in San Francisco in 1980. In San Francisco, she lived in the Bernal Heights neighborhood, where she became known as "The Mayor of Norwich Street", a take-off on San Francisco activist Harvey Milk's nickname "The Mayor of Castro Street". In San Francisco, she worked as an etcher and scanner operator for a printing company—and was the first woman to become a member of the printing trade union in the Pacific Northwest.

== Artistic influences and works ==
Kovick was well known as a cartoonist in lesbian and feminist publications. Her book of essays and cartoons What I Love About Lesbian Politics Is Arguing With People I Agree With was published in 1991 by Alyson Books. Her writings and cartoons were also published in such anthologies as Glibquips: Funny Words by Funny Women, and in LGBT publications such as OUT/LOOK, the San Francisco Bay Times and Gay Comics. Kovick was friends with other writers and cartoonists such as sex columnist Susie Bright, and cartoonist Alison Bechdel, the artist behind the popular "Dykes to Watch Out For" series, who memorialized Kovick in cartoon form in 2008.

Kovick was also known as a writer and performer. She is credited with launching the lesbian spoken-word scene in San Francisco. She hosted a monthly performance night at Red Dora's Bearded Lady Cafe from 1991 to 1993, and continued to perform for years afterwards. In one locally famous performance, she officiated at the mock-wedding of drag performers Elvis Herselvis and Justin Bond.

She toured nationally with Sister Spit, a group of women writers that also included such well-regarded authors as Michelle Tea, Eileen Myles, Lynn Breedlove, Sini Anderson and others. In 2000, she founded a reading series at the Jon Sims Center for the Performing Arts, called "San Francisco in Exile." Selected performances from the San Francisco in Exile series are archived on the internet.

== Death ==
She died of breast cancer at age 50 in 2001.

== Posthumous ==
In 2005, Kovick was the subject of a short documentary by director Silas Howard entitled "What I Love About Dying," which screened at the Sundance Film Festival.
