= Alice Y. Hom =

Asian American LGBTQ community activist and author

Alice Y. Hom (born 1967) is an Asian American LGBTQ community activist and author.

== Education ==
Hom received her B.A from Yale, her M.A. in Asian American Studies from UCLA, and her Ph.D. in history from Claremont Graduate University. Her dissertation was titled “Unifying Differences: Lesbian of Color Community Building in Los Angeles & New York, 1970s-1980s”.

== Activism and career ==
Hom has been the Director of Asian American/Pacific Islanders in Philanthropy's Queer Justice Fund since 2010. She now is the Director of Equity and Social Justice for The Northern California GrantMakers. She also is a host the Historically Queer Podcast. She was previously founding Director of the Intercultural Community Center at Occidental College, worked at the Getty Information Institute and Getty Research Institute. Hom has also served on the boards of the Astraea Lesbian Foundation for Justice, Visual Communications, Great Leap, June Mazer Lesbian Archives, and APAIT.

Hom was an editor on Q&A: Queer in Asian America, an award-winning anthology of essays, personal accounts, fiction, and art on the meaning of being LGBTQ in Asian American communities.

In 2013, Governor Jerry Brown reappointed Hom to another term on the Cal Humanities Board, where she has served since 2012.

== Honors and awards ==
- 1998: Lambda Literary Award for Best Book in Lesbian and Gay Anthologies/Non-Fiction
- 1999: Honorable Mention for Outstanding Books Awards, Gustavus Myers Center for Study of Bigotry and Human Rights in North America
- 2001: Book Award from Association for Asian American Studies

== Published works ==
- Hom, Alice Y.; Eng, David L., eds. (1998). Q&A: Queer in Asian America. Philadelphia: Temple University Press.
- Unifying Differences: Lesbian of Color Community Building in Los Angeles & New York, 1970s-1980s (Claremont Graduate University: 2011)

== Personal life ==
Hom was born and raised in the Los Angeles, California area. She now resides in the Bay Area of California.
