= Odd Girls and Twilight Lovers =

1991 non-fiction book by Lillian Faderman

- Cover
- Author: Lillian Faderman
- Language: English
- Subject: History of lesbianism
- Publisher: Columbia University Press
- Publication date: 1991
- Publication place: United States
- Media type: Print
- Pages: 373 pp.
- ISBN: 978-0-231-07488-9
- OCLC: 22906565

Odd Girls and Twilight Lovers: A History of Lesbian Life in Twentieth-Century America is a non-fiction book by Lillian Faderman chronicling lesbian life in the 20th century. In 1992, it won the Stonewall Book Award for non-fiction and was selected as the "Editor's Choice" at the Lambda Literary Awards. In September 2011, Ms. magazine ranked the book 99th on its list of the top 100 feminist non-fiction books.

== Summary ==
The book describes lesbian history as a pattern of alternately tolerant and intolerant decades for American lesbians between 1900 and 1960, as well as the improvements and adverse developments that the author perceives to have taken place since the 1960s. Faderman wrote that the rises and falls of the social acceptance of lesbianism in the United States coincides with gains and losses in women's economic and political freedom more broadly. She describes the relatively liberated 1920s as a period in which lesbian communities formed and that lesbianism had a certain cachet in some circles. In the 1930s, a social conservatism driven in part by the Great Depression led to a period of greater repression. The 1940s and World War II brought a greater demand for women's skills and talent, which led to a temporary tolerance of female independence and female homosexuality. The post-war period and the McCarthyist conservatism of the 1950s led to mainstream intolerance of homosexuality. McCarthyist purges resulted in lesbians losing their jobs, and raids on their homes and gathering places. One result of this repression was an increase in secrecy in the lesbian community, and Faderman credits this secrecy with the development of multiple lesbian subcultures. By the late 1960s, the stigma associated with lesbianism had lessened. She records the lesbian movements of the 1970s as characterized by separatism and a search for ideal community. The 1980s again saw an increase in acceptance, and more lesbians choosing middle class lifestyles, but also a backlash against homosexuality in the wake of the AIDS crisis as the 1990s dawned (and the book was published).

The material in the book is drawn from a variety of sources, including "memoirs, literary work, personal correspondence, journalism and 186 interviews."

The book looks to the late nineteenth century to examine the roots of lesbian relationships. She explores the romantic friendships of middle-class, college-educated women such as reformer Jane Addams, feminist leader Carrie Chapman Catt, and Bryn Mawr College president M. Carey Thomas, saying that this form of friendship was considered socially acceptable for women of their class at the time. She asserts that these relationships were certainly emotionally intense, and that they may or may not have been sexual. She argues that although the increase in women's sexual freedom since then has benefited lesbians, it has also "undercut" romantic friendship.

== Reception ==
Writing in the Los Angeles Times, novelist Francine Prose described Faderman's book as "full of facts and wonderful details that readers may not have encountered, things that are a pleasure to learn and that seem valuable to know." In The Washington Post, Susan Brownmiller called the book "a remarkable social history" that "attains the depth and evenhandedness of a scholarly classic". Toni McNaron wrote in the Journal of the History of the Behavior Science that "Faderman's ability to paint such a detailed and vivid picture of conditions in lesbian culture makes this book accessible to a general reading audience." Kath Weston says in her Signs review, "I have waited years for a book on lesbians or gay men to devote as much attention to class as Faderman has done in this volume." Leila Rupp says, "Faderman has enriched the story by shining light in corners that had remained stubbornly in the shadows."
