= Robert Drake (editor) =

American editor

- Writing career
- Notable awards: Lambda Literary Award for Anthology (1998)
- Website: karla-jay.com

Robert Drake (born May 14, 1962) is an American editor, most well known for his work editing LGBT writing. His anthology His(2) won the Lambda Literary Award for Anthology in 1998, and another five of his anthologies have been finalists for the award.

== 1999 homophobic attack ==
On January 31, 1999, two men, Glen Mahon and Ian Monaghan, approached him while he sat on his porch in Sligo, Ireland. Drake recognized the men from a bar he had visited earlier in the night and invited them inside. The men proceeded to beat Drake until he was unconscious, claiming he had flirted with them, though those who knew Drake at the time said such an act would be out of character. Drake's partner at the time found him the next morning and brought him to hospital where he spent months in a coma. His friends and family relocated him to Philadelphia, where he began rehabilitation to improve his memory and motor skills to complete everyday tasks.

Mahon and Monaghan "were found guilty in October 1999 of intentionally or recklessly causing serious harm and sentenced to eight years in prison."

Due to his traumatic brain injury, Drake uses a wheelchair and has a speech impediment and motor skill impairments.

The story of the attack and Drake's subsequent recovery became the subject of the 2013 documentary Where I Am.

== Awards and honors ==
Year	Work	Award	Result	Ref.
2001	Circa 2000: Lesbian Fiction at the Millenium	Lambda Literary Award for Anthology	Finalist	
2000	His 3	Lambda Literary Award for Anthology	Finalist	
2000	Hers 3	Lambda Literary Award for Anthology	Finalist	
1998	His 2	Lambda Literary Award for Anthology	Winner	
1996	His	Lambda Literary Award for Anthology	Finalist	
1992	Indivisible: New Short Fiction by West Coast Gay and Lesbian Writers	Lambda Literary Award for Anthology	Finalist	

== Publications ==
=== Works edited ===
- Indivisible: New Short Fiction by West Coast Gay and Lesbian Writers, with Terry Wolverton (1991)
- His (1995)
- His 2, with Terry Wolverton (1997)
- Hers 3, with Terry Wolverton (1999)
- His 3, with Terry Wolverton (1999)
- Circa 2000: Lesbian Fiction at the Millenium, with Terry Wolverton (2000)

=== Works written ===
- The Man: A Hero for Our Time. Book One: Why? (1995)
- The Gay Canon: Great Books Every Gay Man Should Read (1998)
