= Lillian Faderman =

American historian (born 1940)

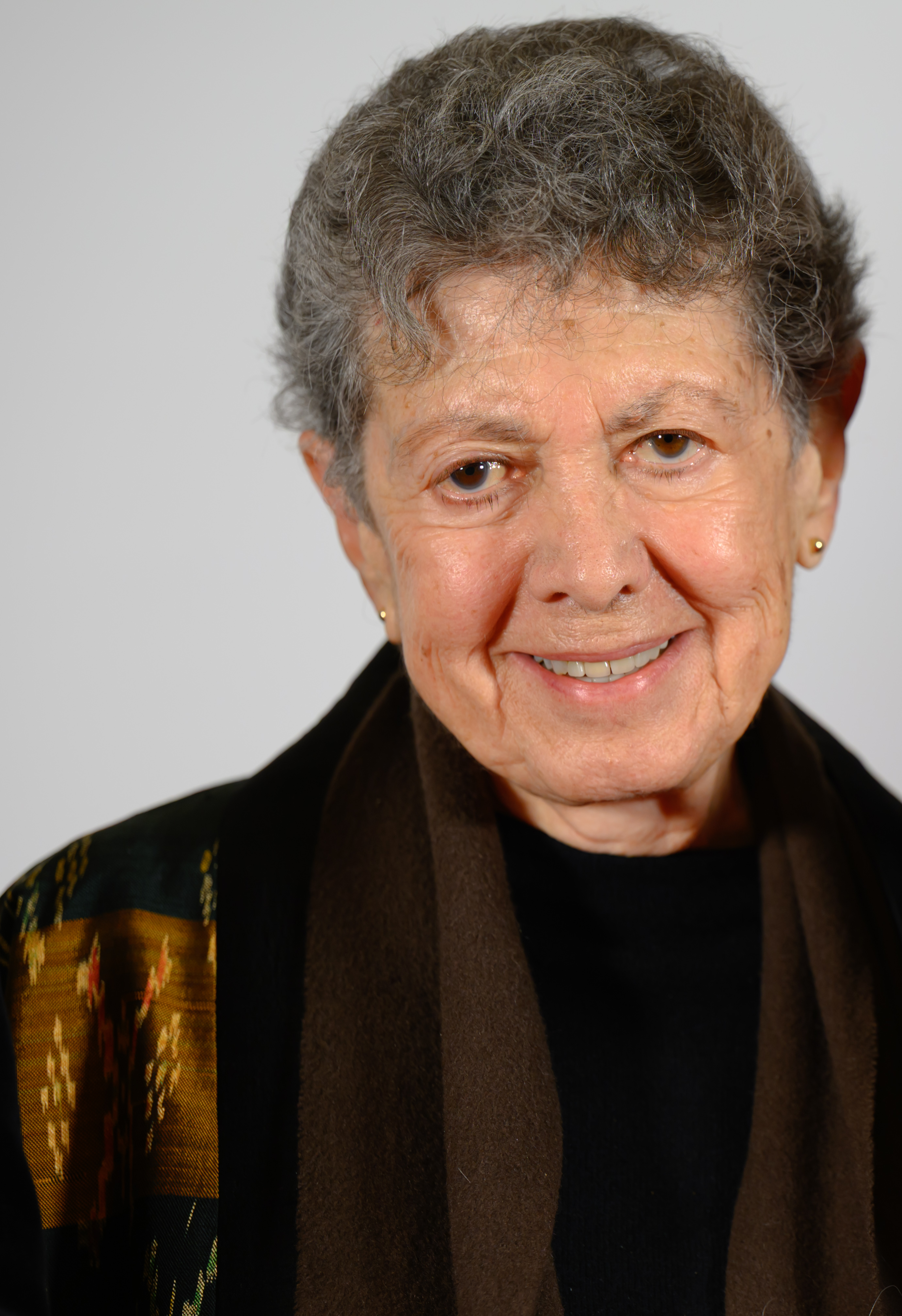
- Faderman in 2026
- Born: July 18, 1940 (age 86); New York City, U.S.
- Education: University of California, Berkeley; University of California, Los Angeles
- Occupations: Writer, historian
- Partner: Phyllis Irwin
- Children: Avrom
- Writing career
- Subjects: Lesbian history, LGBT history

Lillian Faderman's signature (Women's library of Bologna) from the book: "Una storia tutta per noi, un'antologia"

Lillian Faderman (born July 18, 1940) is an American historian whose books on lesbian history and LGBT history have earned critical praise and awards. The New York Times named three of her books on its "Notable Books of the Year" list. In addition, The Guardian named her book, Odd Girls and Twilight Lovers, one of the Top 10 Books of Radical History. She was a professor of English at California State University, Fresno (Fresno State), which bestowed her emeritus status, and a visiting professor at University of California, Los Angeles (UCLA). She was also one of the co-founders responsible for the creation of the Gender Studies Department at Fresno State University. She retired from academe in 2007. Faderman has been referred to as "the mother of lesbian history" for her groundbreaking research and writings on lesbian culture, literature, and history.

== Early life ==
Faderman was born in the Bronx. She was raised by her mother, Mary, and her aunt, Ray. In 1914, her mother emigrated from a shtetl in Latvia to New York City, planning eventually to send for the rest of the family. Her aunt Ray came in 1923, but the rest of the family was killed during Hitler's extermination of European Jews, and Mary blamed herself for not being able to rescue them. Her guilt contributed to a serious mental illness that would profoundly affect her daughter.

Mary and Ray, Faderman's mother and aunt, worked in the garment industry for very little money. Lillian was her mother's third pregnancy; her mother (unmarried) aborted the first two pregnancies at Lillian's biological father's request, but insisted on bearing and raising the third. Mary married when Lillian was a teenager and died in 1979, continuing to have a profound influence on her daughter's life.

Using pseudonyms such as Gigi Frost, Faderman did nude modeling and made softcore nude film loops which paid for her education. She gave her experience in the softcore porn industry in her memoir book Naked in the Promised Land.

== Education ==
Faderman received her BA from University of California, Berkeley and her PhD from University of California, Los Angeles.

== Personal life ==
Her family moved with her to Los Angeles where, with her mother's encouragement, Lillian took acting classes. She began modeling as a teenager, discovered the gay bar scene, and eventually met her first girlfriend. Before she graduated from Hollywood High School, she married a gay man much older than herself—a marriage that lasted less than a year.

Faderman came out as lesbian in the 1950s. She lives with her partner, Phyllis Irwin. She and Phyllis raised one son, Avrom, conceived through artificial insemination by an anonymous Jewish donor.

== Awards and honors ==
- The New York Times (Notable Book of 1981) for Surpassing the Love of Men: Romantic Friendship and Love Between Women from the Renaissance to the Present
- Stonewall Book Award (1982) for Surpassing the Love of Men: Romantic Friendship and Love Between Women from the Renaissance to the Present
- Lambda Literary Award (Editor's Choice Award, 1992) for Odd Girls and Twilight Lovers: A History of Lesbian Life in Twentieth-Century America
- The New York Times (Notable Book of 1992) for Odd Girls and Twilight Lovers: A History of Lesbian Life in Twentieth-Century America
- Stonewall Book Award (Nonfiction, 1992) for Odd Girls and Twilight Lovers: A History of Lesbian Life in Twentieth-Century America
- Lambda Literary Award for Best Non-fiction Book (2000) for To Believe in Women: What Lesbians Have Done For America - A History
- Lambda Literary Award for Best Lesbian/Gay Anthology (2003) for Naked in the Promised Land
- Yale University James Brudner Prize for Exemplary Scholarship in Lesbian/Gay Studies (2001)
- Paul Monette-Roger Horwitz Trust Award (1999)
- Bill Whitehead Award for Lifetime Achievement (Publishing Triangle, 2004) for Naked in the Promised Land
- Judy Grahn Award for Memoir (Publishing Triangle, 2004) for Naked in the Promised Land
- Two Lambda Literary Awards for Best Nonfiction Book & LGBT Arts and Culture Award (2007) both awards for Gay L. A.: A History of Sexual Outlaws, Power Politics and Lipstick Lesbians
- Lambda Literary Award (Pioneer Award, 2013)
- The New York Times (Notable Book of 2015) for The Gay Revolution
- The Washington Post (Notable Nonfiction Book of 2015) for The Gay Revolution
- Anisfield-Wolf Book Award (Nonfiction, 2016) for The Gay Revolution
- Golden Crown Literary Society 2017 Trailblazer Award

== Works ==
- Faderman, Lillian (1981). Surpassing the Love of Men: Romantic Friendship and Love Between Women from the Renaissance to the Present (1st ed.). William Morrow & Company. ISBN 068803733X.
- Faderman, Lillian (1983). Scotch Verdict: Miss Pirie and Miss Woods v. Dame Cumming Gordon (1st ed.). William Morrow & Company. ISBN 068801559X.
- Faderman, Lillian (1991). Odd Girls and Twilight Lovers: A History of Lesbian Life in Twentieth-Century America (1st ed.). Columbia University Press. ISBN 0231074883.
- Faderman, Lillian, ed. (1994). Chloe Plus Olivia: An Anthology of Lesbian and Bisexual Literature from the 17th Century to the Present (1st ed.). Viking Books. ISBN 0670846384.
- Faderman, Lillian; Xiong, Ghia (1998). I Begin My Life All Over: The Hmong and the American Immigrant Experience (1st ed.). Beacon Press. ISBN 0-8070-7234-6.
- Faderman, Lillian (1999). To Believe in Women: What Lesbians Have Done For America – A History (1st ed.). Houghton Mifflin Company. ISBN 039585010X.
- Faderman, Lillian (2003). Naked in the Promised Land: A Memoir (1st ed.). Houghton Mifflin Harcourt. ISBN 0-618-12875-1.
- Faderman, Lillian; Timmons, Stuart (2006). Gay L. A.: A History of Sexual Outlaws, Power Politics, and Lipstick Lesbians (1st ed.). Basic Books. ISBN 978-0465022885.
- Faderman, Lillian (2013). My Mother's Wars (1st ed.). Beacon Press. ISBN 978-0807050521.
- Faderman, Lillian (2015). The Gay Revolution: The Story of the Struggle (1st ed.). Simon & Schuster. ISBN 978-1451694116.
- Faderman, Lillian (2018). Harvey Milk: His Lives and Death (1st ed.). Yale University Press. ISBN 978-0300222616.
- Faderman, Lillian (2022). Woman: The American History of an Idea (1st ed.). Yale University Press. ISBN 978-0300249903.

== Adaptations ==
Filming on an adaption of the book Scotch Verdict by Flora Nicholson and Sophie Heldman took place in 2025, with the title The Education of Jane Cumming. The Education of Jane Cumming premiered at the Berlinale, Berlin's international film festival and won the first place prize at the Ukraine international queer film festival in 2026.The story was also the inspiration for Lillian Hellman's 1934 play The Children's Hour.
