= Lambda Literary Awards =

Annual awards for LGBTQ+ literature

Lambda Literary Award
- Lambda Literary Award Seal
- Location: New York City, U.S.
- Country: United States
- Presented by: Lambda Literary Foundation
- First award: 1989; 37 years ago
- Website: www.lambdaliterary.org/awards

Lambda Literary Awards, also known as the "Lammys", are awarded yearly by Lambda Literary to recognize the role LGBTQ+ writers play in shaping the world. The Lammys celebrate the best in LGBTQ+ literature.

The Lambda Literary Awards are the most comprehensive awards dedicated to LGBTQ literature in the U.S.^{:123} They recognize books published in English, available in the U.S., and covering LGBTQ+ themes in specific subject categories.^{:9} In addition to the primary literary awards, Lambda Literary also presents a number of special awards.

The awards began in 1989 with fourteen awards and prizes dedicated to gay and lesbian literature of different genres and styles. The Lammys have since grown to include bisexual and transgender literature as well as works dealing with themes on the broader LGBTQ+ spectrum. The Lambda Literary Awards are one of a number of LGBTQ literary awards. Other prominent awards include those by Publishing Triangle, the Stonewall Book Awards, and the Gaylactic Spectrum Awards.

== Award categories ==
Lambda Literary Awards are bestowed in a number of categories across genres and identities. Categories change with time, especially via combination or splitting. This is usually based on the foundation's estimate of whether a given category will receive more than 20 submissions for three years in a row. If a category receives less than ten books in a year, it will not compete, and its books may be reassigned. Categories may also be added to recognize works pertaining to more identities along the LGBTQ+ spectrum.

Winners of the Lambda Literary Awards, also known as "Lammy Awards", are announced at an award ceremony, and given trophies but no cash prize. The Lambda Literary Foundation also publishes sponsored Special Prizes, whose winners are announced close to the ceremony and offered cash prizes.

=== Active awards as of 2026 ===
==== Awards ====
- Bisexual Literature, often split into Bisexual Fiction, Bisexual Non-Fiction, Bisexual Poetry. (Note: In both the bisexual and transgender categories, presentation may vary according to the number of eligible titles submitted in any given year. If the number of titles warrants, then separate awards are presented in either two (Fiction and Nonfiction, with the Fiction category inclusive of poetry titles) or three (Fiction, Nonfiction and Poetry) categories, while if a smaller number of titles is deemed eligible, then a merged Literature shortlist is put forward. However, even when the category shortlists have been merged, judges still retain the right to identify a single winner in the unlisted category; for example, at the 25th Lambda Literary Awards in 2013 the judges named both fiction and non-fiction winners in the Bisexual Literature category, and at the 29th Lambda Literary Awards in 2017 the judges picked a title from the Bisexual Fiction shortlist as the winner in Bisexual Poetry despite the lack of an advance poetry shortlist.) (Note: The Transgender Literature and Bisexual Literature categories were combined into one Transgender/Bisexual category for 2002, which was the first explicit representation of a Bisexual category. Bisexual awards returned as their own categories in 2006.)
- Gay Fiction
- Gay Memoir or Biography, previously Gay Biography or Autobiography, and recombined into Biography and Autobiography/Memoir.
- Gay Poetry
- Gay Romance
- Lesbian Fiction
- Lesbian Memoir or Biography, previously Lesbian Biography or Autobiography, and recombined into Biography and Autobiography/Memoir.
- Lesbian Poetry
- Lesbian Romance
- LGBTQ+ Anthology, previously split into Gay Anthology and Lesbian Anthology, and Anthology Fiction and Anthology Nonfiction
- LGBTQ+ Children's, Middle Grade, and/or Young Adult
- LGBTQ+ Comics, previously Graphic Novels
- LGBTQ+ Drama
- LGBTQ+ Mystery, previously split into Gay Mystery and Lesbian Mystery. (Note: Science Fiction and Mystery were categorized as Gay Mystery/Science Fiction and Lesbian Mystery/Science Fiction for the first year of the Lambdas, and separated thereafter.)
- LGBTQ+ Nonfiction, previously split into Gay Nonfiction and Lesbian Nonfiction
- LGBTQ+ Poetry
- LGBTQ+ Romance & Erotica, previously split into Erotica and Romance, with Erotica sometimes split into Gay Erotica and Lesbian Erotica
- Speculative Fiction, previously Science Fiction, Fantasy, and Horror, sometimes split into Gay Science Fiction and Fantasy and Lesbian Science Fiction and Fantasy.
- LGBTQ+ Studies, previously split into Gay Studies and Lesbian Studies
- Transgender Literature, often split into Transgender Fiction, Transgender Non-Fiction, and Transgender Poetry. Previously called Transgender/Genderqueer Literature.

==== Special prizes ====
- Karla Jay Prize for Emerging Writers in Gender and Sexuality Studies
- Denneny Award for Editorial Excellence
- Pat Holt Prize for Critical Arts Writing
- Jeanne Córdova Prize for Lesbian/Queer Nonfiction
- Jim Duggins, PhD Outstanding Mid-Career Novelist Prize
- J. Michael Samuel Prize for Emerging Writers Over 50

=== Discontinued awards since 2026 ===
Awards are often combined with similar ones when there aren't enough recurring submissions to sustain a category, but sometimes awards are discontinued. Some categories are removed for a given year when there are too few submissions. The first Lambda Literary Awards were in twelve categories, predominantly focused on gay and lesbian literature. Many have since grown into broader categories or become inactive. There were two original prizes: Editor's Choice and Publisher Service, which have also ended.

==== Awards ====
- AIDS Literature (1–3)
- Arts and Culture
- Belles Lettres
- Editor's Choice
- Humor
- LGBT Debut Fiction, previously split into Gay Debut Fiction and Lesbian Debut Fiction
- Photography/Visual Arts, previously Visual Arts
- Small Press, previously split into Gay Small Press and Lesbian Small Press
- Spirituality

==== Special prizes ====
- Bridge Builder Award
- Editor's Choice
- Independent Press Award
- Judith A. Markowitz Award for Exceptional New LGBTQ Writers
- Publisher's Service
- Publishing Professional Award
- Randall Kenan Prize for Black LGBTQ Fiction
- Trustee Award
- Visionary Award, previously Pioneer Award

== History ==
L. Page "Deacon" Macubbin started the Lambda Book Report in 1987 to recognize works by LGBTQ writers, but he wanted to establish complementary awards to create further recognition. The first Lambda Literary Awards were held in 1989 for works published in 1988. There were twelve categories based on genre, subject, style, publisher, and identity, and two additional awards.^{:136-137} The initial awards predominantly focused on gay and lesbian literature, with many categories specifically devoted to genre work targeted at either identity.

The awards recognize books published in English and available in the U.S., so almost all finalists have been U.S. or Canadian works.^{:9} The awards have also required submissions to be published as printed books. This made it much less likely that self-published authors, especially those marginalized or excluded from publishing opportunities, could compete.^{:110}

Early categories such as HIV/AIDS literature were dropped as the prominence of the AIDS crisis within the gay community waned, and categories for bisexual and transgender literature were added as the community became more inclusive. The first award for trans literature was in 1997. A bisexual category was first added in 2002 as part of the lone category for trans works, and a bisexual category returned on its own in 2006.

Until 2002, books could be nominated for an award for free, and nomination forms were shared via the Lambda Book Report, via publisher mailing lists, and at gay and lesbian bookstores. Some readers claimed this process was too much of a popularity contest or easily swayed towards works favored by literary elites, with Naiad Press sometimes blamed for having an advantage over smaller independent presses.^{:111-113} Nominations changed in 2003 to require a $15 fee, several book copies, and only allow submissions from publishers, authors, and people associated with a given book.^{:113-114}

Lambda Awards have defined eligible literature as works dealing with themes of an award's identity label, rather than works written by authors whose identities match the award.^{:129-131} They changed this policy from 2009-2012 due to criticism that the awards weren't honoring enough LGBTQ authors, but further controversy led the foundation to revert the change and instead ensure judges identify as LGBTQ, while reserving three special prizes for authors with LGBTQ identities.^{:190} However, the underlying requirements for the new prizes excluded bisexual and trans people. By 2013, the judging panels and leadership of the awards had also grown more diverse, across intersections including gender, race, ability, age, job, and location, than in previous years.

By 2012, submissions had grown to a record of 600 works from 250 publishers. The program grew to 22 awards in 2013, and 26 in 2026. The awards have retained many categories specifically for gay and lesbian literature, but slowly added more categories that are identity-neutral within the bounds of the LGBT, or later LGBTQ and LGBTQ+ spectrums.^{:138} For instance, in 2018, a few awards and prizes specified that they were open to LGBTQ works, while others were listed under LGBT or more specific identities.^{:21} As of 2018 there had been no identity-based award categories involving race, and the only intersectional category was Spirituality.^{:146} A special prize, the Randall Kenan Prize for Black LGBTQ Fiction, was given annually from 2021 to 2025.

Since 2022, submissions for Lambda Awards may be made without supplying paper copies of the work, but the foundation states this may hurt the book's advancement through rounds of judging. However, some books submitted this way have made it to the finalist round.

== Notable winners ==
=== Repeat winners in a category ===
Ellen Hart has won five awards in the Lesbian Mystery category, the most by any single author, and is one of only three writers to have won the award more than once (with three-time winners Katherine V. Forrest and J. M. Redmann). Similarly, Michael Nava has won five awards in the Gay Mystery category, the most by any single author, and is one of only four writers to have won the award more than once (with three-time winner John Morgan Wilson, two-time winner R. D. Zimmerman, and two-time winner Marshall Thornton). Marshall Thornton is the only author in the gay mystery category to have won twice for two different series.

Alison Bechdel has won four awards in the Humor category, the most by any single author, and is one of five writers to have won the award more than once (with Joe Keenan, Michael Thomas Ford, David Sedaris, and David Rakoff). The Humor category has been discontinued.

Nicola Griffith and Melissa Scott have each won four awards in the Scifi/Fantasy/Horror category, and are two of six writers to have won the SFFH award more than once (with Stephen Pagel, Jim Grimsley, and Lee Thomas).

Sarah Waters has won three awards in the Lesbian Fiction category, for Tipping the Velvet (2000), Fingersmith (2002), and The Night Watch in (2007), and is one of only three writers to have won the Lesbian Fiction award more than once (with two-time winners Dorothy Allison and Achy Obejas).

Mark Doty and Adrienne Rich have each won three awards in the Poetry category, and are two of seven poets to have won the award more than once (with two-time winners Joan Larkin, Michael Klein, Marilyn Hacker, Audre Lorde, and J. D. McClatchy)

Richard Labonté, Radclyffe, and Tristan Taormino have each won two awards in the Erotica category, each winning once before the category was split into Gay and Lesbian subdivisions, and each winning their second after the category was split.

Karin Kallmaker and Michael Thomas Ford have each won two awards in the Romance category, each winning one before the category was split into Gay and Lesbian subdivisions – Kallmaker with Maybe Next Time and Ford with Last Summer, but in 2004 – and each winning their second after the category was split – Ford with Changing Tides in 2008 and Kallmaer with The Kiss That Counted in 2009.

Colm Tóibín is the only writer to have won two awards in the Gay Fiction category for The Master in 2004 and for The Empty Family in 2011.

Paul Monette is the only writer to have won two awards in the Gay Non-Fiction category, for Borrowed Time in 1989 and for Becoming a Man in 1993.

=== Repeat winners across categories ===
Lillian Faderman is the only writer to have won awards in seven different categories, having received:

- The Editor's Choice Award for Odd Girls and Twilight Lovers in 1992
- The Fiction Anthology Award for Chloe Plus Olivia in 1995
- The Lesbian Studies Award for To Believe in Women in 2000
- The Autobiography/Memoir Award for Naked in the Promised Land in 2004
- The LGBT Arts & Culture award for Gay L.A.: A History of Sexual Outlaws, Power Politics and Lipstick Lesbians in 2007
- The LGBT Non-Fiction award for Gay L.A.: A History of Sexual Outlaws, Power Politics and Lipstick Lesbians in 2007
- The Pioneer Award in 2013.

Several authors have won awards in three different categories:

- Katherine V. Forrest won the Scifi/Fantasy/Horror award for Daughters of an Emerald Dusk in 2005 and the Pioneer Award in 2013 in addition to her five Lesbian Mystery awards.
- Dorothy Allison received both the Lesbian Small Press and Lesbian Fiction awards for Trash: Short Stories in 1989, and the Lesbian Studies award for Skin in 1995, as well as a second Lesbian Fiction award in 1998 for Cavedweller.
- Edmund White received the Gay Fiction award for The Beautiful Room Is Empty in 1989, the Gay Biography/Autobiography award for Genet in 1993, and the Fiction Anthology award for Fresh Men: New Voices in Gay Fiction in 2005.
- Michael Thomas Ford received the Humor award twice (with Alec Baldwin Doesn't Love Me and Other Trials of My Queer Life in 1999 and That's Mr. Faggot to You in 2000), the Romance award twice (with Last Summer in 2004 and Changing Tides in 2008), the Gay Mystery award (with What We Remember in 2010), and the Jim Duggins Outstanding Mid-Career Novelists' Prize in 2014.
- Eileen Myles received the Small Press award for The New Fuck You in 1996, the Lesbian Poetry award for School of Fish in 1998 and the Lesbian Fiction award for Inferno (A Poet's Novel) in 2010.
- Michael Bronski received the Non-Fiction Anthology award for Taking Liberties in 1997, the Fiction Anthology award for Pulp Friction in 2004, and the LGBT Non-Fiction award for A Queer History of the United States in 2012.

Several other writers have won awards in more than one category in different years and for different works:

- Alison Bechdel won the Lesbian Biography/Autobiography award for The Indelible Alison Bechdel in 1999, the Lesbian Memoir/Biography award for Fun Home: A Family Tragicomic in 2007, and the Trustee Award in 2014 in addition to her four Humor awards.
- Joan Nestle won the Lesbian Studies award for A Fragile Union in 1999 in addition to her four Anthology awards.
- Nicola Griffith won the Lesbian Memoir/Biography award for And Now We Are Going to Have a Party in 2008 and the Jim Duggins Outstanding Mid-Career Novelists' Prize in 2014 in addition to her four Scifi/Fantasy/Horror awards.
- Tristan Taormino won the Transgender Fiction award for Take Me There: Trans and Genderqueer Erotica in 2012.
- Alan Hollinghurst won the Gay Debut Fiction award for The Swimming Pool Library in 1989 and the Gay Fiction award for The Folding Star in 1995.
- Joseph Hansen won the Gay Mystery award for A Country of Old Men in 1991 and the Gay Fiction award for Living Upstairs in 1993.
- Jeanette Winterson won the Lesbian Fiction award for Written on the Body in 1994 and the Lesbian Memoir/Biography award for Why Be Happy When You Could Be Normal? in 2013.
- Judy Grahn won the Lesbian Non-Fiction award for Really Reading Gertrude Stein in 1990 and the Poetry award for love belongs to those who do the feeling in 2009.
- Rafael Campo won the Gay Poetry award for What the Body Told in 1997 and the Gay Biography/Autobiography award for The Poetry of Healing in 1998.
- Devon Carbado and Donald Weise won the Fiction Anthology award for Black Like Us in 2003 and the LGBT Studies award for Time on Two Crosses in 2004. Weise also won the Fiction Anthology award again in 2005.
- Alexis De Veaux won the Biography award for Warrior Poet: A Biography of Audre Lorde in 2005 and the Lesbian Fiction award for Yabo in 2015.
- Vestal McIntyre won the Gay Debut Fiction award for You Are Not Alone in 2006 and the Gay Fiction award for Lake Overturn in 2010.
- Mykola Dementiuk won the Bisexual Fiction award for Holy Communion in 2010 and the Gay Erotica award for The Facialist in 2013.
- Dwight McBride won the Gay Fiction Anthology award for Black Like Us in 2003 and the LGBT Studies award for The Delectable Negro in 2015
- Jeff Mann won the Gay Erotica award in 2007 for A History of Barbed Wire and the Gay Romance award in 2015 for Salvation

=== Winners of multiple awards in a year ===
Several writers have won awards in more than one category in the same year for the same work (note that according to current guidelines a book may only be entered in one category):

- Paul Monette received both Gay Non-Fiction and AIDS Literature awards for Borrowed Time: An AIDS Memoir in 1989.
- Michael Nava received both Gay Mystery/Science Fiction and Gay Small Press awards for Golden Boy in 1989.
- Dorothy Allison received both Lesbian Small Press and Lesbian Fiction awards for Trash: Short Stories in 1989.
- Martin B. Duberman received both Gay Anthology and Lesbian Anthology awards for Hidden from History in 1990.
- Jewelle Gomez received both Lesbian Scifi/Fantasy/Horror and Lesbian Fiction awards for The Gilda Stories in 1992.
- Loren Cameron received both Small Press and Transgender awards for Body Alchemy: Transsexual Portraits in 1997.
- Lisa C. Moore received both Small Press and Lesbian Studies awards for Does Your Mama Know? in 1998.
- James Saslow received both Gay Studies and Visual Arts awards for Pictures and Passions in 2000.
- Noelle Howey and Ellen Samuels received both Anthologies/Non-Fiction and Children's/Young Adult awards for Out of the Ordinary in 2001.
- Lillian Faderman and Stuart Timmons received both LGBT Arts & Culture and LGBT Non-Fiction awards for Gay L.A.: A History of Sexual Outlaws, Power Politics and Lipstick Lesbians in 2007.
- Robert Westfield received both Gay Debut Fiction and Gay Fiction awards for Suspension in 2007.

Several writers have won awards in more than one category in the same year for different works:

- Jacqueline Woodson received the awards for Children/Young Adult (with From the Notebooks of Melanin Sun) and Lesbian Fiction (with Autobiography of a Family Photo) in 1996.
- Radclyffe received the awards for Erotica (with Stolen Moments) and Romance (with Distant Shores, Silent Thunder) in 2006.
- Nicola Griffith received the awards for Lesbian Mystery (with The Blue Place) and Scifi/Fantasy/Horror (with Bending the Landscape: Science Fiction) in 1999.
- Karin Kallmaker received the awards for Erotica (with In Deep Water 2: Cruising the Strip, which she co-authored with Radclyffe) and Lesbian Romance (with The Kiss That Counted) in 2009.
- Benjamin Alire Sáenz received the awards for Gay Fiction (with Everything Begins and Ends at the Kentucky Club) and LGBT Children's/Young Adult (with Aristotle and Dante Discover the Secrets of the Universe) in 2013.

== Adaptations ==
Numerous Lambda Award-winning works have been adapted for film and television:

- Allan Bérubé's 1990 book Coming Out Under Fire, which won the 1991 Gay Non-Fiction Award, was adapted into a 1994 documentary film.
- Tony Kushner's 1993 play Angels in America, which won both the 1994 and 1995 Drama Award, was adapted into a 2003 HBO miniseries, starring Al Pacino and Meryl Streep and directed by Mike Nichols.
- Abraham Verghese's 1994 book My Own Country, which won the 1995 Gay Biography Award, was adapted into a 1998 television movie.
- John Berendt's 1994 novel Midnight in the Garden of Good and Evil, which won the 1995 Gay Mystery Award, was adapted into a 1997 film, starring Kevin Spacey and John Cusack and directed by Clint Eastwood.
- Erica Fischer's 1995 book Aimée & Jaguar, which won the 1996 Lesbian Biography Award, was adapted into a 1999 film, starring Maria Schrader and Juliane Köhler and directed by Max Färberböck.
- Dorothy Allison's 1998 novel Cavedweller, which won the 1999 Lesbian Fiction Award, was adapted into a 2004 film, starring Kyra Sedgwick and Aidan Quinn and directed by Lisa Cholodenko.
- Sarah Waters's 1998 novel Tipping the Velvet, which won the 2000 Lesbian Fiction Award, was adapted into a three-part 2002 BBC miniseries, starring Rachael Stirling and Keeley Hawes and directed by Geoffrey Sax.
- John Cameron Mitchell and Stephen Trask's 1998 play Hedwig and the Angry Inch, which won the 2001 Drama Award, was adapted into a 2001 film, starring Mitchell and Trask and directed by Mitchell.
- Michelle Tea's 2000 novel Valencia, which won the 2001, was adapted into a 2011 arthouse film.
- David Ebershoff's 2000 book The Danish Girl, which won the 2001 Transgender Award, was adapted into a 2015 film, starring Eddie Redmayne and Alicia Vikander and directed by Tom Hooper; Vikander subsequently won several awards for her role, including the Best Supporting Actress Oscar at the 88th Academy Awards, the Best Actress Award at the 21st Empire Awards, the Best Supporting Actress Award at the 20th Satellite Awards, and the Supporting Actress Award at the 22nd Screen Actors Guild Awards.
- Sarah Waters's 2002 novel Fingersmith, which won the 2003 Lesbian Fiction Award, was adapted into a two-part 2005 miniseries, starring Sally Hawkins and Imelda Staunton and directed by Aisling Walsh.
- Alison Bechdel's 2006 memoir Fun Home, which won the 2007 Lesbian Memoir Award, was adapted into a 2013 musical play.
- André Aciman's Call Me by Your Name, which won the 2008 Gay Fiction Award, was adapted in a 2017 film starring Timothée Chalamet and Armie Hammer, receiving critical acclaim and over 200 award nominations, including Best Picture, Best Actor, Best Adapted Screenplay and Best Original Song at the 90th Academy Awards.

== Awards by year ==
The Lambda Literary Awards are presented each year to honor works of literature published in the previous year; accordingly, the first awards ceremony may be described in different sources as either the 1989 awards (for the year of presentation) or the 1988 awards (for the year in which the nominated works were published). Submissions are usually open from September-November for titles published in the same year. Finalists will be announced in the spring; and winners will be announced in the fall. For Special Prizes, submissions have opened in March of the award year, for titles published the year before, but in 2026 submissions ran from January to February.

Ceremony	Year of presentation	Year of publication
1st Lambda Literary Awards	1989	1988
2nd Lambda Literary Awards	1990	1989
3rd Lambda Literary Awards	1991	1990
4th Lambda Literary Awards	1992	1991
5th Lambda Literary Awards	1993	1992
6th Lambda Literary Awards	1994	1993
7th Lambda Literary Awards	1995	1994
8th Lambda Literary Awards	1996	1995
9th Lambda Literary Awards	1997	1996
10th Lambda Literary Awards	1998	1997
11th Lambda Literary Awards	1999	1998
12th Lambda Literary Awards	2000	1999
13th Lambda Literary Awards	2001	2000
14th Lambda Literary Awards	2002	2001
15th Lambda Literary Awards	2003	2002
16th Lambda Literary Awards	2004	2003
17th Lambda Literary Awards	2005	2004
18th Lambda Literary Awards	2006	2005
19th Lambda Literary Awards	2007	2006
20th Lambda Literary Awards	2008	2007
21st Lambda Literary Awards	2009	2008
22nd Lambda Literary Awards	2010	2009
23rd Lambda Literary Awards	2011	2010
24th Lambda Literary Awards	2012	2011
25th Lambda Literary Awards	2013	2012
26th Lambda Literary Awards	2014	2013
27th Lambda Literary Awards	2015	2014
28th Lambda Literary Awards	2016	2015
29th Lambda Literary Awards	2017	2016
30th Lambda Literary Awards	2018	2017
31st Lambda Literary Awards	2019	2018
32nd Lambda Literary Awards	2020	2019
33rd Lambda Literary Awards	2021	2020
34th Lambda Literary Awards	2022	2021
35th Lambda Literary Awards	2023	2022
36th Lambda Literary Awards	2024	2023
37th Lambda Literary Awards	2025	2024
38th Lambda Literary Awards	2026	2025

== Controversies ==
=== Bisexual community and Bi Any Other Name ===
In 1992, despite requests from the bisexual community for a more appropriate and inclusive category, the groundbreaking bisexual anthology Bi Any Other Name: Bisexual People Speak Out by Loraine Hutchins and Lani Kaʻahumanu was forced to compete, and lost, in the category "Lesbian Anthology". Additionally, in 2005, Directed by Desire: Collected Poems, a posthumous collection of the bisexual Jamaican-American writer June Jordan's work, competed (and won) in the category "Lesbian Poetry".

Led by BiNet USA, and assisted by other bisexual organizations including the American Institute of Bisexuality, BiPOL, and Bialogue, the bisexual community launched a multi-year struggle that eventually culminated in 2006 with the addition of a Bisexual category. Sheela Lambert was one of these activists: when the Bisexual category grew, then shrank, by 2012, Lambert launched the Bisexual Book Awards to offer more opportunities for the recognition of bisexual literature.

=== Transgender community and The Man Who Would Be Queen ===
In 2004, the book The Man Who Would Be Queen: The Science of Gender-Bending and Transsexualism by the highly controversial researcher J. Michael Bailey was announced as a finalist in the Transgender category of the 2003 Awards.

Transgender people immediately protested the nomination and gathered thousands of petition signatures in opposition within a few days. After the petition, the Foundation's judges examined the book more closely, decided that they considered it transphobic and removed it from their list of finalists. Within a year the executive director who had initially approved of the book's inclusion resigned. Executive director Charles Flowers later stated that "the Bailey incident revealed flaws in our awards nomination process, which I have completely overhauled since becoming the foundation's executive director in January 2006."

== See also ==
- Gaylactic Spectrum Awards
- Triangle Awards by Publishing Triangle
- Stonewall Book Award
