= Lambda Literary Award for LGBT Debut Fiction =

Discontinued literary award for LGBT fiction

The Lambda Literary Award for Debut Fiction is an annual literary award, presented by the Lambda Literary Foundation to a debut work of fiction on LGBT themes. Formerly presented in two separate categories for gay male and lesbian debut fiction, beginning the 25th Lambda Literary Awards in 2013 a single award, inclusive of both male and female writers, was presented. The award was, however, discontinued after the 28th Lambda Literary Awards in 2016.

The award was presented based on themes in the work, not the sexuality or gender of the writer; heterosexual writers were eligible for the award, and writers could be nominated in the "cross-gender" category based on the work.

== Winners and nominees ==
Lambda Literary Award for Debut Fiction winners and finalists
Year	Category	Author	Title	Result	Ref.
1989	Gay Debut Fiction	Alan Hollinghurst	The Swimming-Pool Library	Winner	
1989	Gay Debut Fiction	Joe Keenan	Blue Heaven	Finalist	
1989	Gay Debut Fiction	Stan Levanthal	Mountain Climbing In Sheridan Square	Finalist	
1989	Gay Debut Fiction	C.F. Borgman	River Road	Finalist	
1989	Gay Debut Fiction	Russell A. Brown	Sherlock Holmes and the Mysterious Friend of O. Wilde	Finalist	
1989	Lesbian Debut Fiction	Madelyn Arnold	Bird-Eyes	Winner	
1989	Lesbian Debut Fiction	Joyce Bright	Sunday’s Child	Finalist	
1989	Lesbian Debut Fiction	Judy Grahn	Mundane’s World	Finalist	
1989	Lesbian Debut Fiction	Denise Ohio	The Finer Grain	Finalist	
1989	Lesbian Debut Fiction	Katherine Sturtevant	A Mistress Moderately Fair	Finalist	
1990	Gay Debut Fiction	John Weir	The Irreversible Decline of Eddie Socket	Winner	
1990	Gay Debut Fiction	Randall Kenan	A Visitation of Spirits	Finalist	
1990	Gay Debut Fiction	Mickey C. Fleming	About Courage	Finalist	
1990	Gay Debut Fiction	David B. Feinberg	Eighty-Sixed	Finalist	
1990	Gay Debut Fiction	M.S. Hunter	The Buccaneer	Finalist	
1990	Gay Debut Fiction	Roz Perry	Rose Penski	Finalist	
1990	Lesbian Debut Fiction	Patricia R. Schwartz	The Names of the Moons of Mars	Winner	
1990	Lesbian Debut Fiction	Nisa Donnelly	The Bar Stories: A Novel After All	Finalist	
1990	Lesbian Debut Fiction	Paula Martinac and Carla Tomaso	Voyages Out	Finalist	
1990	Lesbian Debut Fiction	Roz Perry	Rose Penski	Finalist	
1990	Lesbian Debut Fiction	Ruthann Robson	Eye of a Hurricane	Finalist	
1991	Gay Debut Fiction	Lev Raphael	Dancing On Tisha B’av	Winner	
1991	Gay Debut Fiction	Bo Huston	Horse and Other Stories	Finalist	
1991	Gay Debut Fiction	Matthew Stadler	Landscape: Memory	Finalist	
1991	Gay Debut Fiction	Allen Barnett	The Body and Its Dangers	Finalist	
1991	Gay Debut Fiction	Patrick Moore	This Every Night	Finalist	
1991	Lesbian Debut Fiction	Cherry Muhanji	Her	Winner	
1991	Lesbian Debut Fiction	Patricia R. Schwartz	The Names of the Moons of Mars	Winner	
1991	Lesbian Debut Fiction	Nisa Donnelly	Bar Stories: A Novel After All	Finalist	
1991	Lesbian Debut Fiction	Ruthann Robson	Eye of a Hurricane	Finalist	
1991	Lesbian Debut Fiction	Vickie Sears	Simple Songs	Finalist	
1991	Lesbian Debut Fiction	Renee Hansen	Take Me to the Underground	Finalist	
1991	Lesbian Debut Fiction	Karen Marie Christa Minns	Virago	Finalist	
1991	Lesbian Debut Fiction	Paula Martinac and Carla Tomaso	Voyages Out	Finalist	
1991	Lesbian Debut Fiction	Julie Blackwomon and Nona Caspers	Voyages Out 2	Finalist	
1992-2006	No award presented				
2005	Gay Debut Fiction	Blair Mastbaum	Clay’s Way	Winner	
2005	Gay Debut Fiction	Damian McNicholl	A Son Called Gabriel	Finalist	
2005	Gay Debut Fiction	Aaron Krach	Half-Life	Finalist	
2005	Gay Debut Fiction	Mar Acito	How I Paid for College: A Novel of Sex, Theft, Friendship, and Musical Theater	Finalist	
2005	Gay Debut Fiction	Brian Leung	World Famous Love Acts	Finalist	
2005	Lesbian Debut Fiction	Judith Frank	Crybaby Butch	Winner	
2005	Lesbian Debut Fiction	Mary Vermillion	Death by Discount	Finalist	
2005	Lesbian Debut Fiction	Kristie Helms	Dish It Up, Baby!	Finalist	
2005	Lesbian Debut Fiction	Laurinda D. Brown	Fire & Brimstone	Finalist	
2005	Lesbian Debut Fiction	Bridget Bufford	Minus One: A Twelve-Step Journey	Finalist	
2006	Gay Debut Fiction	Vestal McIntyre	You Are Not the One	Winner	
2006	Gay Debut Fiction	Sulyman X	Bilal’s Bread	Finalist	
2006	Gay Debut Fiction	Richard McCann	Mother of Sorrows	Finalist	
2006	Gay Debut Fiction	Mack Friedman	Setting the Lawn on Fire	Finalist	
2006	Gay Debut Fiction	Barry McCrea	The First Verse	Finalist	
2006	Lesbian Debut Fiction	Ali Leibegott	The Beautifully Worthless	Winner	
2006	Lesbian Debut Fiction	Fiona Zedde	Bliss	Finalist	
2006	Lesbian Debut Fiction	Katia Noyes	Crashing America	Finalist	
2006	Lesbian Debut Fiction	Ronica Black	In Too Deep	Finalist	
2006	Lesbian Debut Fiction	Michelle Embree	Manstealing for Fat Girls	Finalist	
2007	Gay Debut Fiction	Robert Westfield	Suspension	Winner	
2007	Gay Debut Fiction	Timothy Williams	5 Minutes & 42 Seconds	Finalist	
2007	Gay Debut Fiction	Martin Hyatt	A Scarecrow’s Bible	Finalist	
2007	Gay Debut Fiction	Patrick Ryan	Send Me	Finalist	
2007	Gay Debut Fiction	Alex MacLennan	The Zookeeper	Finalist	
2007	Lesbian Debut Fiction	Ellis Avery	The Teahouse Fire	Winner	
2007	Lesbian Debut Fiction	Kirsten Dinnall Hoyte	Black Marks	Finalist	
2007	Lesbian Debut Fiction	Ana-Maurine Lara	Erzulie’s Skirt	Finalist	
2007	Lesbian Debut Fiction	Peggy Munson	Origami Striptease	Finalist	
2007	Lesbian Debut Fiction	Leslie Larson	Slipstream	Finalist	
2008	Gay Debut Fiction	Christopher Kelly	A Push and a Shove	Winner	
2008	Gay Debut Fiction	James St. James	Freak Show	Finalist	
2008	Gay Debut Fiction	Kemble Scott	SoMa	Finalist	
2008	Gay Debut Fiction	James Canon	Tales from the Town of Widows	Finalist	
2008	Gay Debut Fiction	Michael Quadland	That Was Then	Finalist	
2008	Lesbian Debut Fiction	Aoibheann Sweeney	Among Other Things, I’ve Taken Up Smoking	Winner	
2008	Lesbian Debut Fiction	Lu Vickers	Breathing Underwater	Finalist	
2008	Lesbian Debut Fiction	Myriam Gurba	Dahlia Season	Finalist	
2008	Lesbian Debut Fiction	Holly Farris	Lockjaw	Finalist	
2008	Lesbian Debut Fiction	Corrina Wycoff	O Street	Finalist	
2009	Gay Debut Fiction	Shawn Stewart Ruff	Finlater	Winner	
2009	Gay Debut Fiction	Evan Fallenberg	Light Fell	Finalist	
2009	Gay Debut Fiction	Daniel Allen Cox	Shuck	Finalist	
2009	Gay Debut Fiction	Drew Ferguson	The Screwed-Up Life of Charlie The Second	Finalist	
2009	Gay Debut Fiction	Mike Hoolboom	The Steve Machine	Finalist	
2009	Lesbian Debut Fiction	Magdalena Zurawski	The Bruise	Winner	
2009	Lesbian Debut Fiction	Meri Weiss	Closer to Fine	Finalist	
2009	Lesbian Debut Fiction	Chavisa Woods	Love Does Not Make Me Gentle or Kind	Finalist	
2009	Lesbian Debut Fiction	Linda Villarosa	Passing for Black	Finalist	
2009	Lesbian Debut Fiction	Jill Malone	Red Audrey & the Roping	Finalist	
2010	Gay Debut Fiction	Rakesh Satyal	Blue Boy	Winner	
2010	Gay Debut Fiction	James Hannaham	God Says No	Finalist	
2010	Gay Debut Fiction	Lance Reynald	Pop Salvation	Finalist	
2010	Gay Debut Fiction	G. Winston James	Shaming the Devil: Collected Short Stories	Finalist	
2010	Gay Debut Fiction	James Magruder	Sugarless	Finalist	
2010	Lesbian Debut Fiction	Rhiannon Argo	The Creamsickle	Winner	
2010	Lesbian Debut Fiction	Maida Tilchen	Land Beyond Maps	Finalist	
2010	Lesbian Debut Fiction	Barb Johnson	More of This World or Maybe Another	Finalist	
2010	Lesbian Debut Fiction	Lori Ostlund	The Bigness of the World	Finalist	
2010	Lesbian Debut Fiction	Z Egloff	Verge	Finalist	
2011	Gay Debut Fiction	David Pratt	Bob the Book	Winner	
2011	Gay Debut Fiction	Rob Stephenson	Passes Through	Finalist	
2011	Gay Debut Fiction	Tom Mendicino	Probation	Finalist	
2011	Gay Debut Fiction	Tom Schabarum	The Palisades	Finalist	
2011	Gay Debut Fiction	Chris Corkum	XOXO Hayden	Finalist	
2011	Lesbian Debut Fiction	Amber Dawn	Sub Rosa	Winner	
2011	Lesbian Debut Fiction	Katharine Beutner	Alcestis	Finalist	
2011	Lesbian Debut Fiction	Georgeann Packard	Fall Asleep Forgetting	Finalist	
2011	Lesbian Debut Fiction	Lois Walden	One More Stop	Finalist	
2011	Lesbian Debut Fiction	Michael Sledge	The More I Owe You	Finalist	
2012	Gay Debut Fiction	Rahul Mehta	Quarantine: Stories	Winner	
2012	Gay Debut Fiction	Justin Chin	98 Wounds	Finalist	
2012	Gay Debut Fiction	Michael Graves	Dirty One	Finalist	
2012	Gay Debut Fiction	Katherine Scott Nelson	Have You Seen Me	Finalist	
2012	Gay Debut Fiction	Garth Greenwell	Mitko	Finalist	
2012	Lesbian Debut Fiction	Laurie Weeks	Zipper Mouth	Winner	
2012	Lesbian Debut Fiction	Sarah Toshiko Hasu	Megume and the Trees	Finalist	
2012	Lesbian Debut Fiction	Lara Fergus	My Sister Chaos	Finalist	
2012	Lesbian Debut Fiction	Christine Stark	Nickels: A Tale of Dissociation	Finalist	
2012	Lesbian Debut Fiction	Sally Bellerose	The Girls Club	Finalist	
2013	Debut Fiction	Mia McKenzie	The Summer We Got Free	Winner	
2013	Debut Fiction	William Sterling Walker	Desire: Tales of New Orleans	Finalist	
2013	Debut Fiction	Lydia Perovic	Incidental Music	Finalist	
2013	Debut Fiction	E.J. Levy	Love, In Theory: Ten Stories	Finalist	
2013	Debut Fiction	Kristen Ringman	Makara: A novel	Finalist	
2013	Debut Fiction	Lysley Tenorio	Monstress	Finalist	
2013	Debut Fiction	Alex Leslie	People Who Disappear	Finalist	
2013	Debut Fiction	Jeanne Thornton	The Dream of Doctor Bantam	Finalist	
2013	Debut Fiction	Carter Sickels	The Evening Hour	Finalist	
2013	Debut Fiction	Lania Knight	Three Cubic Feet	Finalist	
2014	Debut Fiction	Nik Nicholson	Descendants of Hagar	Winner	
2014	Debut Fiction	Abigail Tarttelin	Golden Boy	Finalist	
2014	Debut Fiction	Derek Palacio	How to Shake the Other Man	Finalist	
2014	Debut Fiction	Jane Hoppen	In Between	Finalist	
2014	Debut Fiction	Charles L. Ross	Inside	Finalist	
2014	Debut Fiction	Andrea Routley	Jane and the Whales	Finalist	
2014	Debut Fiction	Laura Krughoff	My Brother’s Name: A Novel	Finalist	
2014	Debut Fiction	Ronald Palmer	Prick Queasy	Finalist	
2014	Debut Fiction	Amy Grace Loyd	The Affairs of Others: A Novel	Finalist	
2014	Debut Fiction	Guy Mark Foster	The Rest of Us: Stories	Finalist	
2015	Debut Fiction	Abdi Nazemian	The Walk-In Closet	Winner	
2015	Debut Fiction	Elizabeth Earley	A Map of Everything	Finalist	
2015	Debut Fiction	Vinton Rafe McCabe	Death in Venice, California	Finalist	
2015	Debut Fiction	Megan Milks	Kill Marguerite and Other Stories	Finalist	
2015	Debut Fiction	Dia Felix	Nochita	Finalist	
2015	Debut Fiction	Dan Lopez	Part the Hawser, Limn the Sea	Finalist	
2015	Debut Fiction	Bob Sennett	The Music Teacher	Finalist	
2015	Debut Fiction	Alden Jones	Unaccompanied Minors	Finalist	
2016	Debut Fiction	Victor Yates	A Love Like Blood	Winner	
2016	Debut Fiction	Mark S. Luckie	Do U.	Finalist	
2016	Debut Fiction	Paul Brownsey	His Steadfast Love and Other Stories	Finalist	
2016	Debut Fiction	Ioannis Pappos	Hotel Living	Finalist	
2016	Debut Fiction	Meliza Bañales	Life is Wonderful, People are Terrific	Finalist	
2016	Debut Fiction	James Driggers	Lovesick	Finalist	
2016	Debut Fiction	Libby Ware	Lum: A Novel	Finalist	
2016	Debut Fiction	Austin Bunn	The Brink	Finalist	
