= 2nd Lambda Literary Awards =

1990 literary awards ceremony

The 2nd Lambda Literary Awards were held in 1990 to honour works of LGBT literature published in 1989.

== Special awards ==
Category	Winner
Editor's Choice	Gertrude Stein (Rebecca Mark, ed.), Lifting Belly
Publisher's Service	Carol Seajay, Feminist Bookstore News

== Recipients ==
2nd Lambda Literary Awards winners and finalists
Category	Author	Title	Result
AIDS Literature	Larry Kramer	Reports from the Holocaust: The Story of an AIDS Activist	Winner
AIDS Literature	Christopher Bram	In Memory of Angel Clare	Finalist
AIDS Literature	Billy Howard	Epitaphs for the Living	Finalist
AIDS Literature	John Preston	Personal Dispatches	Finalist
AIDS Literature	Susan Sontag	AIDS and Its Metaphors	Finalist
Gay Anthology	Martin B. Duberman	Hidden from History	Winner
Gay Anthology	Christie Balka and Andy Rose	Twice Blessed	Finalist
Gay Anthology	Charles Ludlam	Collected Plays of Charles Ludlam	Finalist
Gay Anthology	Michael Nava	Finale: Stories of Mystery	Finalist
Gay Anthology	John Preston	Personal Dispatches	Finalist
Gay Debut Fiction	John Weir	The Irreversible Decline of Eddie Socket	Winner
Gay Debut Fiction	David B. Feinberg	Eighty-Sixed	Finalist
Gay Debut Fiction	Mickey C. Fleming	About Courage	Finalist
Gay Debut Fiction	M. S. Hunter	The Buccaneer	Finalist
Gay Debut Fiction	Randall Kenan	A Visitation of Spirits	Finalist
Gay Fiction	David B. Feinberg	Eighty-Sixed	Winner
Gay Fiction	Christopher Bram	In Memory of Angel Clare	Finalist
Gay Fiction	Dennis Cooper	Closer	Finalist
Gay Fiction	Kevin Killian	Shy	Finalist
Gay Fiction	Armistead Maupin	Sure of You	Finalist
Gay Mystery	Mark Richard Zubro	Simple Suburban Murder	Winner
Gay Mystery	Stan Leventhal	Faultlines: Stories of Suspense	Finalist
Gay Mystery	Jeffrey N. McMahan	Somewhere in the Night	Finalist
Gay Mystery	Michael Nava	Finale	Finalist
Gay Mystery	Samuel M. Steward	Caravaggio Shawl	Finalist
Gay Non-Fiction	Neil Miller	In Search of Gay America: Women and Men in a Time of Change	Winner
Gay Non-Fiction	Richard A. Isay	Being Homosexual	Finalist
Gay Non-Fiction	Sheppard B. Kominars	Accepting Ourselves	Finalist
Gay Non-Fiction	Harold Norse	Memoirs of a Bastard Angel	Finalist
Gay Non-Fiction	W. J. Weatherby	James Baldwin: Artist on Fire	Finalist
Gay science fiction, fantasy or horror	Jeffrey N. McMahan	Somewhere in the Night	Winner
Gay science fiction, fantasy or horror	William K. Eakins	Key West 2720 AD	Finalist
Gay science fiction, fantasy or horror	Mercedes Lackey	Magic's Pawn	Finalist
Gay science fiction, fantasy or horror	Geoff Mains	Gentle Warriors	Finalist
Gay science fiction, fantasy or horror	Thom Nickels	Walking Water/After All This	Finalist
Humor	Robert Triptow	Gay Comics	Winner
Humor	Elizabeth Dean	Cut-Outs and Cut-Ups	Finalist
Humor	N. Leigh Dunlap	Run That Sucker at Six!!!	Finalist
Humor	Celeste West	Lesbian Love Advisor	Finalist
Humor	T. R. Witomski	Kvetch	Finalist
Lesbian Anthology	Tee Corinne	Intricate Passions	Winner
Lesbian Anthology	Martin B. Duberman	Hidden from History	Winner
Lesbian Anthology	C. McEwen and S. O'Sullivan	Out the Other Side	Winner
Lesbian Anthology	Irene Zahava	Lesbian Love Stories	Finalist
Lesbian Anthology	Terry Woodrow	Lesbian Bedtime Stories	Finalist
Lesbian Debut Fiction	Patricia R. Schwartz	The Names of the Moons of Mars	Winner
Lesbian Debut Fiction	Nisa Donnelly	The Bar Stories: A Novel After All	Finalist
Lesbian Debut Fiction	Paula Martinac and Carla Tomaso	Voyages Out	Finalist
Lesbian Debut Fiction	Roz Perry	Rose Penski	Finalist
Lesbian Debut Fiction	Ruthann Robson	Eye of a Hurricane	Finalist
Lesbian Fiction	Nisa Donnelly	The Bar Stories: A Novel After All	Winner
Lesbian Fiction	Valerie Miner	Trespassing and Other Stories	Finalist
Lesbian Fiction	Jane Rule	After the Fire	Finalist
Lesbian Fiction	May Sarton	Education of Harriet Hatfield	Finalist
Lesbian Fiction	Shay Youngblood	The Big Mama Stories	Finalist
Lesbian Mystery	Katherine V. Forrest	The Beverly Malibu	Winner
Lesbian Mystery	Antoinette Azolakov	The Contactees Die Young	Finalist
Lesbian Mystery	Ellen Hart	Hallowed Murder	Finalist
Lesbian Mystery	Claire McNab	Fatal Reunion	Finalist
Lesbian Mystery	Barbara Wilson	Dog Collar Murders	Finalist
Lesbian Non-Fiction	Judy Grahn	Really Reading Gertrude Stein	Winner
Lesbian Non-Fiction	Christie Balka and Andy Rose	Twice Blessed	Finalist
Lesbian Non-Fiction	Loralee MacPike	There's Something I've Been Meaning to Tell You	Finalist
Lesbian Non-Fiction	Cynthia Rich	Desert Years	Finalist
Lesbian Non-Fiction	Celeste West	Lesbian Love Advisor	Finalist
Lesbian science fiction, fantasy or horror	Jessica Amanda Salmonson	What Did Miss Darrington See?	Winner
Lesbian science fiction, fantasy or horror	Nancy Tyler Glenn	Clicking Stones	Finalist
Lesbian science fiction, fantasy or horror	Lee Lynch	Sue Slate: Private Eye	Finalist
Lesbian science fiction, fantasy or horror	Susanna J. Sturgis	Memories and Visions	Finalist
Lesbian science fiction, fantasy or horror	Lauren Wright Douglas	In the Blood	Finalist
Poetry	Michael Klein	Poets for Life	WInner
Poetry	Cheryl Clarke	Humid Pitch: Narrative Poetry	Finalist
Poetry	Robert Glück	Reader	Finalist
Poetry	Christian McEwen	Naming the Waves	Finalist
Poetry	Adrienne Rich	Time's Power: Poems 1985-1988	Finalist
Small Press	Larry Mitchell	My Life As a Mole	Winner
Small Press	Judy Dahl	River of Promise	Finalist
Small Press	Mike Hippler	Matlovich: The Good Soldier	Finalist
Small Press	Joan Lindau	Letting in the Night	Finalist
Small Press	Vega Studios	Men of Color	Finalist
Young adult/children's	MaryKate Jordan	Losing Uncle Tim	Winner
Young adult/children's	Susan Cohen and Daniel Cohen	When Someone You Know Is Gay	Finalist
Young adult/children's	A.M. Homes	Jack	Finalist
Young adult/children's	Leslea Newman and Diana Souza	Heather Has Two Mommies	Finalist
Young adult/children's	George Shannon	Unlived Affections	Finalist
