= 3rd Lambda Literary Awards =

1991 literary awards ceremony

The 3rd Lambda Literary Awards were held in 1991 to honour works of LGBT literature published in 1990.

== Special awards ==
Category	Winner
Editor's Choice	Wayne Dynes, The Encyclopedia of Homosexuality
Publisher Service	Phil Willkie and Greg Baysans, The James White Review

== Nominees and winners ==
Category	Author	Title	Result
AIDS Literature	Elizabeth Osbourn	The Way We Live Now	Winner
AIDS Literature	ACT UP/New York Women	Women, AIDS & Activism	Finalist
AIDS Literature	Michael Callen	Surviving AIDS	Finalist
AIDS Literature	Douglas Crimp	AIDS Demo Graphics	Finalist
AIDS Literature	Cindy Patton	Inventing AIDS	Finalist
Gay Anthology	George Stambolian	Men on Men 3	Winner
Gay Anthology	Franklin Abbott	Men & Intimacy	Finalist
Gay Anthology	Robert Kus	Gay Men of Alcoholics Anonymous	Finalist
Gay Anthology	Robert Kus	Keys to Caring	Finalist
Gay Anthology	Richard L. Stone, Marsh Cassady, and Richard Stephen Smith	Triple Fiction	Finalist
Gay Debut Fiction	Lev Raphael	Dancing on Tisha B’av	Winner
Gay Debut Fiction	Allen Barnett	The Body and Its Dangers	Finalist
Gay Debut Fiction	Bo Huston	Horse and Other Stories	Finalist
Gay Debut Fiction	Patrick Moore	This Every Night	Finalist
Gay Debut Fiction	Matthew Stadler	Landscape: Memory	Finalist
Gay Fiction	Allen Barnett	The Body and Its Dangers	Winner
Gay Fiction	Michael Cunningham	A Home at the End of the World	Finalist
Gay Fiction	John Gilgun	Music I Never Dreamed Of	Finalist
Gay Fiction	David Leavitt	A Place I’ve Never Been	Finalist
Gay Fiction	Paul Monette	Afterlife	Finalist
Gay Mystery	Michael Nava	Howtown	Winner
Gay Mystery	Joseph Hansen	Boy Who Was Buried This Morning	Finalist
Gay Mystery	Stan Leventhal	Black Marble Pool	Finalist
Gay Mystery	Grant Michaels	Body to Dye For	Finalist
Gay Mystery	Mark Richard Zubro	Why Isn’t Becky Twitchell Dead?	Finalist
Gay Non-Fiction	Allan Bérubé	Coming Out Under Fire	Winner
Gay Non-Fiction	Mike Hippler	So Little Time	Finalist
Gay Non-Fiction	Mary Ann Humphrey	My Country, My Right to Serve	Finalist
Gay Non-Fiction	Dave Pallone	Behind the Mask	Finalist
Gay Non-Fiction	Stuart Timmons	Trouble With Harry Hay	Finalist
Gay Poetry	Michael Lassell	Decade Dance	Winner
Gay Poetry	Francisco X. Alarcón	Body in Flames	Finalist
Gay Poetry	Mark Ameen	Buried Body	Finalist
Gay Poetry	James Broughton	Special Deliveries	Finalist
Gay Poetry	Kenny Fries	Healing Notebooks	Finalist
Gay science fiction, fantasy or horror	Toby Johnson	Secret Matter	Winner
Gay science fiction, fantasy or horror	Mercedes Lackey	Magic's Price	Winner
Gay science fiction, fantasy or horror	Marsh Cassady	Alternate Casts	Finalist
Gay science fiction, fantasy or horror	Storm Constantine	Enchantments of Flesh and Spirit	Finalist
Gay science fiction, fantasy or horror	Scott Edelman	The Gift	Finalist
Gay Small Press	Michael Willhoite	Daddy's Roommate	Winner
Gay Small Press	Robert Chesley	Hard Plays/Stiff Parts	Finalist
Gay Small Press	Kate Dyer	Gays in Uniform	Finalist
Gay Small Press	Jack Fritscher	Some Dance to Remember	Finalist
Gay Small Press	Stuart Timmons	Trouble With Harry Hay	Finalist
Humor	Alison Bechdel	New, Improved Dykes to Watch Out For	Winner
Humor	Susie Bright	Susie Sexpert’s Lesbian Sex World	Finalist
Humor	Andrea Natalie	Stonewall Riots	Finalist
Humor	Gail Sausser	More Lesbian Etiquette	Finalist
Humor	Terry Woodrow	Meatmen Vol. 8	Finalist
Lesbian Anthology	Joan Nestle and Naomi Holoch	Women on Women	Winner
Lesbian Anthology	Jeffner Allen	Lesbian Philosophies and Cultures	Finalist
Lesbian Anthology	Karla Jay and Joanne Glasgow	Lesbian Texts and Contexts	Finalist
Lesbian Anthology	Terry Woodrow	Lesbian Bedtime Stores 2	Finalist
Lesbian Anthology	Irene Zahava	Speaking Four Ourselves	Finalist
Lesbian Debut Fiction	Cherry Muhanji	Her	Winner
Lesbian Debut Fiction	Julie Blackwomon and Nona Caspers	Voyages Out 2	Finalist
Lesbian Debut Fiction	Renee Hansen	Take Me to the Underground	Finalist
Lesbian Debut Fiction	Karen Marie Christa Minns	Virago	Finalist
Lesbian Debut Fiction	Vickie Sears	Simple Songs	Finalist
Lesbian Fiction	Paula Martinac	Out of Time	Winner
Lesbian Fiction	Jane DeLynn	Don Juan in the Village	Finalist
Lesbian Fiction	Melanie Kaye/Kantrowitz	My Jewish Face	Finalist
Lesbian Fiction	Anna Livia	Incidents Involving Mirth	Finalist
Lesbian Fiction	Sarah Schulman	People in Trouble	Finalist
Lesbian Mystery	Lauren Wright Douglas	Ninth Life	Winner
Lesbian Mystery	Barbara Wilson	Gaudi Afternoon	Winner
Lesbian Mystery	Sarah Dreher	A Captive in Time	Finalist
Lesbian Mystery	Camarin Grae	Slick	Finalist
Lesbian Mystery	Claire McNab	Death Down Under	Finalist
Lesbian Non-Fiction	Bonnie Zimmerman	The Safe Sea of Women	Winner
Lesbian Non-Fiction	Susie Bright	Susie Sexpert’s Lesbian Sex World	Finalist
Lesbian Non-Fiction	Becky Butler	Ceremonies of the Heart	Finalist
Lesbian Non-Fiction	Marcia Freedman	Exile in the Promised Land	Finalist
Lesbian Non-Fiction	Kate Millett	Loony-Bin Trip	Finalist
Lesbian Poetry	Marilyn Hacker	Going Back to the River	Winner
Lesbian Poetry	S. Diane Bogus	Chant of the Women of Magdalena	Finalist
Lesbian Poetry	Irena Klepfisz	A Few Words in the Mother Tongue	Finalist
Lesbian Poetry	Minnie Bruce Pratt	Crime Against Nature	Finalist
Lesbian Poetry	Yvonne Zipter	Patience of Metal	Finalist
Lesbian science fiction, fantasy or horror	Gael Baudino	Gossamer Axe	Winner
Lesbian science fiction, fantasy or horror	Pat Califia	Doc and Fluff	Finalist
Lesbian science fiction, fantasy or horror	Lynda Lyons	Priorities	Finalist
Lesbian science fiction, fantasy or horror	Karen Marie Christa Minns	Virago	Finalist
Lesbian science fiction, fantasy or horror	Melissa Scott	Mighty Good Road	Finalist
Lesbian Small Press	Louise Rafkin (ed.)	Different Mothers	Winner
Lesbian Small Press	Gloria E. Anzaldúa	Making Face/Making Soul	Finalist
Lesbian Small Press	Bev Jo, Linda Strega, and Ruston	Dykes-Loving-Dykes	Finalist
Lesbian Small Press	Susan E. Johnson	Staying Power: Long Term Lesbian Couples	Finalist
Lesbian Small Press	Evelyn C. White	Black Women’s Health Book	Finalist
