= Barbara May Cameron =

Native American author, artist, and activist (1954–2002)

- Cameron in 1996
- Born: May 22, 1954; Standing Rock Indian Reservation
- Died: February 12, 2002 (aged 47); San Francisco
- Education: Institute of American Indian Arts, San Francisco Art Institute
- Partner: Linda Boyd

Barbara May Cameron (May 22, 1954 – February 12, 2002) was a Native American photographer, poet, writer, and human rights activist in the fields of lesbian/gay rights, women's rights, and Native American rights.

== Early life ==
Barbara May Cameron was born on May 22, 1954. She was a Hunkpapa Lakota from the Fort Yates band of the Standing Rock Sioux Tribe in Fort Yates, North Dakota. She grew up on the Standing Rock Indian Reservation, North Dakota, raised by her grandparents. Completing her early education and high schooling on the reservation, she went on to further her education in photography and film at the Institute of American Indian Arts in Santa Fe, New Mexico. In 1973, Cameron moved to San Francisco to attend the San Francisco Art Institute.

== Career ==
As a photographer and movie maker, Cameron won media and theater arts awards. Her screenplay "Long Time, No See", remained unfinished at her death.

Cameron co-founded the Gay American Indians (GAI), in 1975 with Randy Burns, a Northern Paiute. GAI was the first gay American Indian liberation organization. The reason for founding GAI, according to Cameron, was that Native American gay people had different needs and struggles than the white gay community. Moreover, there was a general lack of support for people of color within the lesbian and gay community.

In 1978, Cameron contributed to the anthology Our Right to Love: a lesbian resource book.

From 1980 to 1985, Cameron participated in organizing San Francisco's Lesbian Gay Freedom Day Parade and Celebration and contributed in 1981 to This Bridge Called My Back: Writings by Radical Women of Color, edited by Cherríe Moraga and Gloria E. Anzaldúa. Her article Gee, You Don't Seem Like an Indian from the Reservation analyzed topics like racism and homophobia from both inside and outside the Native American community. In 1983, she contributed to the landmark collection A Gathering of Spirit: A Collection of Writing and Art by North American Indian Women. The anthology, edited by Beth Brant, included works by twelve Native lesbians.

In the late 1980s, Cameron was vice president of the Alice B. Toklas LGBT Democratic Club and co-chair for Lesbian Agenda for Action. In 1986, Cameron, together with other women who called themselves Somos Hermanas (We are sisters), went to Nicaragua to study and show solidarity with women there, and to help improve their lives. In 1988, she served as a delegate for Jesse Jackson's Rainbow Coalition to the Democratic National Convention. That same year, she was appointed by Dianne Feinstein, then San Francisco Mayor, to the Citizens Committee on Community Development and the San Francisco Human Rights Commission. She was appointed by Frank Jordan, the next mayor, to serve on the United Nations Commission on the Status of Women.

From 1989 to 1992, Cameron acted as executive director of Community United Against Violence (CUAV), assisting victims of domestic violence and hate crimes. She received the Harvey Milk Award for Community Service in 1992 and the following year, she was the first recipient of the Bay Area Career Women Community Service Award. That same year, she was a participant in the International Indigenous AIDS Network as part of the International Conference on AIDS held in Berlin. She spent 1993 engaged in AIDS education, traveling to various Indian reservations throughout the United States.

Cameron's essay No Apologies: A Lakota Lesbian Perspective was included in New Our Right to Love: A Lesbian Resource Book (1996). She served on the board of directors for both the San Francisco AIDS Foundation and the American Indian AIDS Institute and as a consultant to the Centers for Disease Control and Prevention and the United States Department of Health and Human Services. She was the founder of Institute on Native American Health and Wellness, with her first project publishing the works of Native American women writers.

Barbara Cameron's papers are held by the James Hormel LGBTQIA center at the San Francisco Public Library.

Cameron was honored in a Google Doodle on May 22, 2023.

== Personal life ==
Cameron was in a 21-year relationship with Linda Boyd, with whom she raised a son, Rhys Boyd-Farrell. In an effort to record key figures of the Lesbian and Gay community, Robert Giard created a portrait of Cameron which is now part of the Beinecke Rare Book & Manuscript Library.

== Death ==
Cameron died of natural causes at her home on February 12, 2002, aged 47. Her memorial service was attended by Tom Ammiano, president of the San Francisco Board of Supervisors and Carole Migden, who at the time represented District 13 in the California State Assembly. Cameron was remembered for her advocacy of gay and lesbian Native Americans.

== See also ==
- Native American women in politics
