= Public Books =

American academic book review website

- Available in: English
- Creators: Sharon Marcus and Caitlin Zaloom
- Website: www.publicbooks.org
- Launched: 2012; 14 years ago
- Current status: active

Public Books is an American book review website that publishes accessible reviews written by academics and public intellectuals.

== Overview ==
Founding editors Caitlin Zaloom and Sharon Marcus launched Public Books in mid-2012 to "give scholars a chance to weigh in on contemporary culture at a faster pace than scholarly publishing allows, but with more rigor and more time for reflection than journalism usually permits." The site publishes one essay or interview a day, five times a week.

The first Public Books article was a review of Jeffrey Eugenides's novel The Marriage Plot by founding editor Sharon Marcus. This article and several others were published before the site's first official issue, which went live in June 2012.

Since its founding, Public Books has shown interest in American politics, art, finance, climate change and pop culture (especially television shows and comics). Contributors frequently review books critical of racism or capitalism. Bustle described Public Books as a place to find articles that blend "reading, writing, and art with activism—making space for the diverse voices we need to keep hearing more of." Public Books is one of several new online and print magazines—including Jacobin and n+1—that the Chronicle of Higher Education credits with catalyzing an "intellectual renaissance" in the United States.

Public Books is known for publishing scholarly responses to current events. In June 2016, historians N. D. B. Connolly and Keisha N. Blain published a syllabus at Public Books for a potential course on the political success of Donald Trump in the 2016 American presidential election. The syllabus was so popular in the days after the election that it briefly downed the Public Books website.

== Awards ==
In 2013, The Daily Beast gave Public Books a #BeastBest award for its "meaty book writing."

== Notable Contributors ==
Well-known contributors to Public Books include:

- Judith Butler
- Masha Gessen
- Fredric Jameson
- Gayatri Chakravorty Spivak
- Ellis Avery (editor, Public Streets)
- Camilo José Vergara
