= Sarah Dreher =

American dramatist

- Born: March 26, 1937; Hanover, Pennsylvania
- Died: April 2, 2012 (aged 75); Amherst, Massachusetts
- Occupations: Novelist; playwright; psychologist
- Writing career
- Period: 20th century
- Genre: Mystery
- Notable work: Solitaire and Brahms
- Literary movement: Lesbian literature

Sarah Dreher (born March 26, 1937, Hanover, Pennsylvania – died April 2, 2012, Amherst, Massachusetts) was an American lesbian novelist and playwright, and best known for her award-winning lesbian mystery series featuring amateur sleuth Stoner McTavish.

Her themes include "the anguish of lesbian relationships beginning, ending or mending. Dreher's lesbian protagonists are modern heroes searching for integrity and identity..." In the resolution of her mysteries, solutions other than resorting to traditional justice system intervention are part of the exploration of society outside the existing social paradigm.

Dreher has contributed essays and writings to a number of projects, including Off the Rag: Lesbians Writing about Menopause by Lee Lynch and Akia Woods, "Waiting for Stonewall" in Sexual Practice/Textual Theory: Lesbian Cultural Criticism, and a contributed chapter to They Wrote the Book: Thirteen Women Mystery Writers Tell All.

In addition to writing, Dreher was a clinical psychologist in private practice, graduating first from Wellesley College, then gaining a Ph.D. in psychology from Purdue University.

== Work ==
Books:

- Solitaire and Brahms (1997) [novel]. (New Victoria)
- Stoner McTavish Series, (New Victoria)
  - Stoner McTavish (1985)
  - Something Shady (1986)
  - Gray Magic (1987)
  - A Captive in Time (1990)
  - Otherworld (1993)
  - Bad Company (1995)
  - Shaman's Moon (1998)
  - Love Murders (unpublished)
- Lesbian Stages: Plays by Sarah Dreher. New Victoria. (1988),
  - Contains:
    - Alumnae News: The Doris Day Years = winner of the 1st Jane Chambers National Playwriting Award 1987 for full length play
    - Base Camp
    - Backward, Turn Backward
    - This Brooding Sky
    - Hollandia ’45
- PLACES PLEASE! The First Anthology of Lesbian Plays Aunt Lute publishing Company (1985) included:
  - 8 x 10 Glossy by Sarah Dreher = Winner of the 1st Lesbian Playwrighting Contest, Theatre Rhinocros 1985
  - Ruby Christmas by Sarah Dreher

== Awards ==
- 8 X 10 Glossy, 1985, 1st Lesbian Playwrighting Contest, Theatre Rhinoceros San Francisco CA winner
- Alumnae News: The Doris Day Years, 1987, 1st Jane Chambers National Playwrighting Award—full length play winner
- Shaman's Moon, 1998 Lambda Literary Award for Lesbian Mystery winner
- A Captive in Time, 1990 Lambda Literary Award for Lesbian Mystery finalist
- Medalist, 2005 The Alice B Readers Award

== See also ==
- Markowitz, Judith A, foreword by Katherine V. Forrest. The Gay Detective Novel (MacFarland)
- Munt, Sally. Murder by the Book?: Feminism and the Crime Novel, 1990, (Routledge)
- Zimmerman, Bonnie. The Safe Sea of Women: Lesbian Fiction 1969-1989, 1992 (Beacon)
- Lambda Literary Foundation
- Lesbian literature
- Lesbian Fiction
