= Laurie Weeks =

Laurie Weeks may refer to:

- Laurie Weeks (writer), writer and performer based in New York City
- Laurie Weeks (rugby) (born 1986), Australian rugby union footballer
