= Amber Dawn =

Canadian writer

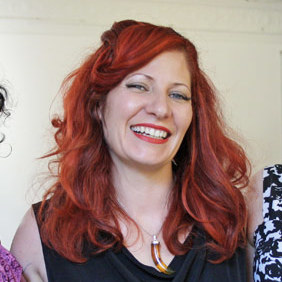
- Born: Fort Erie, Ontario, Canada
- Occupations: Writer; editor; poet
- Writing career
- Period: 2000s–present
- Notable work: Sub Rosa
- Notable awards: 2011 Lambda Literary Award for Lesbian Debut Fiction; 2012 Dayne Ogilvie Prize
- Website: amberdawnwrites.com

Amber Dawn is a Canadian writer. She won the 2012 Dayne Ogilvie Prize, presented by the Writers' Trust of Canada to an emerging LGBTQ writer.

A writer, filmmaker, and performance artist based in Vancouver, British Columbia, Dawn published her debut novel Sub Rosa in 2010. The novel won that year's Lambda Literary Award for Lesbian Debut Fiction. In 2013, she released a book of essays and poems entitled How Poetry Saved My Life: A Hustler's Memoir. The book was shortlisted in the Lesbian Memoir or Biography category at the 26th Lambda Literary Awards, and won the 2013 City of Vancouver Book Award.

Dawn was also an editor of the anthology Fist of the Spider Woman: Tales of Fear and Queer Desire, which a nominee for the Lambda Literary Award for LGBT Sci-Fi/Fantasy/Horror in 2009, and was co-editor with Trish Kelly of With a Rough Tongue: Femmes Write Porn.

Dawn was director of programming for the Vancouver Queer Film Festival for four years, ending in 2012. In 2017, she rejoined the Vancouver Queer Film Festival as co-artistic director with Anoushka Ratnarajah, and left in September 2018.

She served alongside Vivek Shraya and Anne Fleming on the Dayne Ogilvie Prize jury in 2013, selecting C. E. Gatchalian as that year's winner.

Her second novel, Sodom Road Exit, was published in 2018. It was shortlisted for the Lambda Literary Award for Lesbian Fiction at the 31st Lambda Literary Awards in 2019.

In 2020 Dawn and Justin Ducharme received a Lambda Literary Award nomination for Anthology at the 32nd Lambda Literary Awards, as co-editors of Hustling Verse: An Anthology of Sex Workers' Poetry.

In 2021, her poetry collection My Art Is Killing Me was shortlisted for the Jim Deva Prize for Writing that Provokes. In 2026 she won the Dorothy Livesay Poetry Prize for Buzzkill Clamshell.

== Bibliography ==
Published	Title	Type	ISBN	Notes
2005	With a Rough Tongue: Femmes Write Porn	Anthology	ISBN 978-1551521930	editor
2009	Fist of the Spider Woman: Tales of Fear and Queer Desire	Anthology	ISBN 978-1551522517	editor
2010	Sub Rosa	Novel	ISBN 978-1551523613	
2013	How Poetry Saved My Life	Memoir	ISBN 978-1551525006	
2015	Where the Words End and My Body Begins	Poetry collection	ISBN 978-1551525839	
2018	Sodom Road Exit	Novel	ISBN 978-1551527161	
2019	Hustling Verse: An Anthology of Sex Workers' Poetry	Poetry collection	ISBN 978-1551527819	editor
2020	My Art is Killing Me and Other Poems	Poetry collection	ISBN 978-1551527932	
2025	Buzzkill Clamshell	Poetry collection	ISBN 9781551529790	
