= Christopher Kelly (author) =

American writer

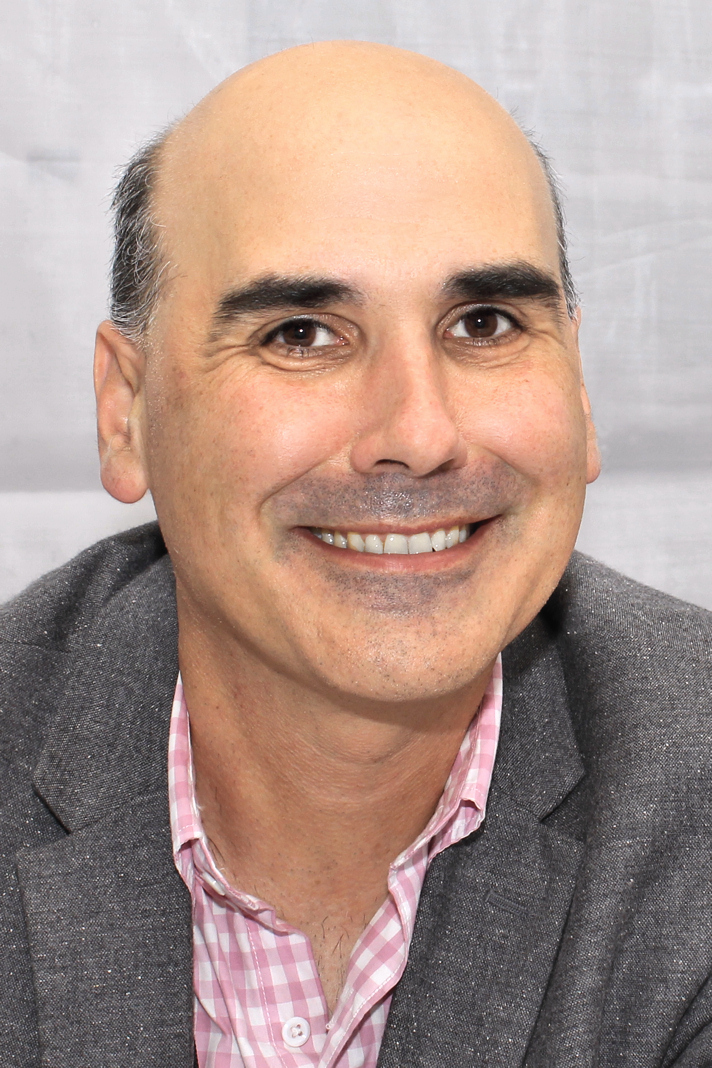
- Kelly at the 2016 Texas Book Festival
- Born: United States
- Education: Dartmouth College
- Occupations: Novelist, journalist
- Writing career
- Period: 2000s–present
- Notable work: A Push and a Shove
- Notable awards: Lambda Literary Award for Gay Debut Fiction
- Website: thepinkomnibus.com

Christopher Kelly is an American writer, who won the Lambda Literary Award for Gay Debut Fiction at the 20th Lambda Literary Awards in 2008 for his debut novel A Push and a Shove.

His second novel, The Pink Bus, was published by Lethe Press in 2016. He is also a journalist and film and theatre critic, whose work has appeared in the Fort Worth Star-Telegram, Texas Monthly, The New York Times, the Newark Star-Ledger, Slate, Salon and The Boston Globe.

A graduate of Dartmouth College, he lives in the New York metropolitan area with his husband.

== Works ==
- A Push and a Shove (2007, ISBN 978-1593500481)
- The Pink Bus (2016, ISBN 978-1590214954)
