= Guy Mark Foster =

American writer and academic

- Education: Brown University (PhD)
- Occupations: short story writer, academic
- Writing career
- Language: English
- Years active: 2010s-present
- Notable work: The Rest of Us
- Website: guymarkfoster.com

Guy Mark Foster is an American writer and academic. His short story collection The Rest of Us was a finalist for the Lambda Literary Award for Debut Fiction at the 26th Lambda Literary Awards in 2014.

A professor of African-American literature and sexuality studies at Bowdoin College, Foster's stories have also appeared in the anthologies Shadows of Love: American Gay Fiction, Brother to Brother: New Writings by Black Gay Men, and Ancestral House: The Black Short Story in the Americas and Europe. He received his Ph.D. from Brown University.
