= John Gilgun =

American writer (1935–2021)

- Born: October 1, 1935; Malden, Massachusetts, U.S.
- Died: April 30, 2021 (aged 85)
- Education: Boston University; University of Iowa
- Occupation: Writer
- Writing career
- Genres: fiction, poetry
- Notable work: Music I Never Dreamed Of

John Gilgun (October 1, 1935 – April 30, 2021) was an American writer. He is best known for his 1989 novel Music I Never Dreamed Of, which was a shortlisted nominee for the Lambda Literary Award for Gay Fiction at the 3rd Lambda Literary Awards in 1990.

Gilgun's other works included Everything That Has Been Shall Be Again: The Reincarnation Fables of John Gilgun (1981); the poetry collections The Dooley Poems (1991), From the Inside Out (1991), In the Zone: The Moby Dick Poems (2002) and The Dailies (2010); and the short story collection Your Buddy Misses You (1994).

A graduate of Boston University and the University of Iowa, Gilgun was a longtime teacher of English and creative writing at Missouri Western State University until his retirement in 2000.

Giglun died on April 30, 2021, at the age of 85.
