= Terri Meyette =

American poet

Terri Meyette is a Yaqui poet known for her anti-colonialist writings. Her work was published in A Gathering of Spirit.
