= Gay American Indians =

Gay rights organization

Gay American Indians (GAI) was a gay rights organization (Note: The one-word unifying term in the 1950s through the early 1980s was gay (see Gay liberation). Later ('70s/80s) this was expanded by many groups to lesbian and gay, then by the '90s and '00s to lesbian, gay, bisexual, transgender (LGBT). It wasn't until the late eighties and early nineties that queer began to be reclaimed as a one-word alternative to the ever-lengthening string of initials, initially used by radical political groups.) founded in San Francisco in 1975 by Randy Burns (Northern Paiute) and Barbara May Cameron (Hunkpapa Lakota). It was notable for being the first association for gay Native Americans in the United States. Although initially a social group, GAI became involved in AIDS activism and the promotion of the Two-Spirit concept and community.

== History ==
The founding of GAI took place in the context of the Red Power and gay liberation movements. Originally, it acted as a gathering space for gay and lesbian Natives from across the Bay Area, who were excluded from the gay bars in the Castro district because of their race. GAI was also intended to serve as a "support group," as gay American Indians were often excluded not only from the majority-white gay community but from modern Indigenous communities as well, which often associated homosexuality with colonization. Within five years of its founding, GAI was 150 strong; it reached 1,000 participants in 1988.

The organization began the GAI History Project in 1984 to collect the oral records and traditions of same-sex relationships as well as gender variance in Indigenous tribes. Subsequently, in 1988, GAI and the History Project, in collaboration with white anthropologist Will Roscoe, published Living the Spirit: A Gay American Indian Anthology. Living the Spirit contained fiction, non-fiction, and poetry, as well as visual art, from gay Native contributors, with a particular focus on Two-Spirits. It also included a list of 133 tribes' different words and identities for Two-Spirit people. Noted Mohawk poet Maurice Kenny, a contributor to the anthology, was connected to GAI, though not a member.

== Activism ==
GAI's work started within the organization, through facilitating mutual aid and creating a network for its members. Once the group became more politically active, GAI members became involved in organizing for prominent Indigenous issues like "land rights, water rights, and fishing rights". One of the group's main causes was fighting the effects of the AIDS pandemic on Native Americans. Many AIDS organizations in the Bay Area served primarily non-Native communities, and there was limited support inside Native communities for those fighting the virus. To fill this vacuum, GAI helped to found both the Indian AIDS Project and the American Indian AIDS Institution to provide resources for gay Natives. Co-founder Randy Burns commented in 2015 that 82 members of GAI had died of AIDS.

A continuation of GAI's work from Living the Spirit was its promotion of the modern neologism, "Two-Spirit", invented in 1990, as an umbrella term to replace the anthropological term "berdache". "Berdache", likely taken from the French for "passive male partner" and used for prostituted boys, was considered by GAI to be colonialist and offensive. At the 1992 Annual Meeting of the American Anthropological Association, members of GAI met with anthropologists from the AAA to advocate for the substitution of "Two-Spirit" for "berdache" in scholarly works. At later conferences, anthropologists began addressing this terminology issue themselves, and the word was disavowed.

== Records ==
Records from GAI are held by the GLBT Historical Society.
