= Ellis Avery =

American writer (1972–2019)

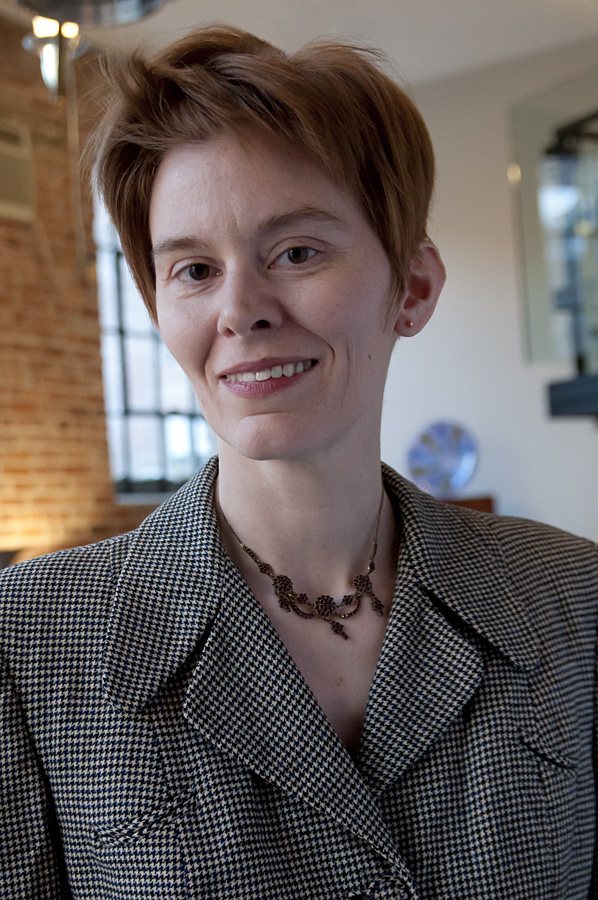
- Avery in 2011
- Born: Elisabeth Atwood; October 25, 1972
- Died: February 15, 2019 (aged 46)
- Education: Bryn Mawr College; Goddard College (MFA)
- Spouse: Sharon Marcus
- Writing career
- Years active: 2003–2019
- Notable works: The Teahouse Fire, The Last Nude, Tree of Cats
- Notable awards: Stonewall Book Award, Lambda Literary Award
- Website: web.archive.org/web/20190219130218/https://www.ellisavery.com/

Ellis Avery (born Elisabeth Atwood; October 25, 1972 – February 15, 2019) was an American writer. She was the only author to win two Stonewall Book Awards, one in 2008 for her debut novel The Teahouse Fire and one in 2013 for her second novel The Last Nude. The Teahouse Fire also won a Lambda Literary Award for Lesbian Debut Fiction and an Ohioana Library Fiction Award in 2007. She self-published her memoir, The Family Tooth, in 2015. Her final book, Tree of Cats, was independently published posthumously.

== Early life ==
Born Elisabeth Atwood, Avery was raised in Columbus, Ohio, and Princeton, New Jersey. She legally changed her name to Ellis Avery when she was 18.

== Education and career ==
As Elisabeth Atwood, Avery attended Columbus School for Girls in Columbus, Ohio, and Princeton Day School in Princeton, New Jersey, from which she graduated a year early, in 1989. While at Princeton Day School, Avery edited and contributed to the literary magazine, Cymbals, sang a cappella in the school's competitive Madrigals group, participated in the drama club, and earned a Merit Scholarship. After Princeton Day School, Avery attended Bryn Mawr College, graduating in 1993 with an independent major in Performance Studies. While at Bryn Mawr, she was an editor of and frequent contributor to The College News. She earned an MFA in Writing from Goddard College's low-residency program. Avery taught creative writing at Columbia University, and previously at the University of California at Berkeley. From September 2017 through December 2018, she pursued a nurse practitioner degree at the MGH Institute of Health Professions and was posthumously inducted into Sigma Theta Tau, the Honor Society of Nursing.

== Daily haiku ==
Beginning in 2000, Avery wrote haiku daily. She published these online, in hard copy in Broken Rooms (2014), in a self-published collection called 365 one-line haiku in 2015, and in haiku-a-day datebooks for the years 2017, 2018, and 2019.

== Personal life ==
An out lesbian, her spouse was Sharon Marcus.

In 2012, Avery was diagnosed with leiomyosarcoma, a rare type of cancer that affects smooth muscle tissue. She died on February 15, 2019.

== Culture ==
Themes of Avery's work include "aesthetically disciplined bodies" and "the will to make beauty that exceeds [pain]" She was interested in the formation of queer identity before queerness was a "social category"; as such, she was at the forefront of a queer historical fiction movement in which the historical setting is, among other things, an allegory for the queer child awakening to her identity in a household that cannot recognize or name her existence. Avery and her spouse, Sharon Marcus, a professor of English and French literature, influenced each other's work through a shared interest in interrogating received social constructs about women's relationships and lesbian identity in historical contexts. In her later work, through her struggles with cancer and reactive arthritis, Avery became interested in medical narratives by both those afflicted with illness and medical professionals, and in 2018 led a narrative medicine storytelling and writing workshop at Harvard Medical School.

== Works ==
- The Smoke Week – Gival Press, (2003)
- The Teahouse Fire (2006)
- The Last Nude (2012)
- Broken Rooms (2014)
- The Family Tooth (2015)
- Editor, "Public Streets" series at Public Books.
- Tree of Cats (2020)

== Awards ==
- American Library Association Stonewall Fiction Award for The Teahouse Fire and The Last Nude
- Lambda Literary Award for Debut Fiction for The Teahouse Fire
- Ohioana Library Fiction Award for The Teahouse Fire
- Kiriyama Prize Notable Book for The Teahouse Fire
- Booklist Top 10 First Novels on Audio for The Teahouse Fire
- Golden Crown Historical Fiction Award for The Last Nude
- Walter Rumsey Marvin Award for Emerging Writers, Ohioana Library Association, for The Smoke Week

== See also ==
- LGBT culture in New York City
- List of LGBT people from New York City
- NYC Pride March
