= A Push and a Shove =

2007 thriller novel by Christopher Kelly

A Push and a Shove: A Novel
- Author: Christopher Kelly
- Language: English
- Publisher: Alyson Books
- Publication date: September 2007
- Publication place: United States
- Media type: Print (paperback)
- Pages: 312
- ISBN: 978-1-59350-048-1
- OCLC: 144596584

A Push and a Shove: A Novel is a 2007 novel in the thriller genre by Christopher Kelly. Kelly, an openly gay man, is a film critic and journalist for Fort Worth Star-Telegram and Texas Monthly. Kelly developed the story over four years and it is "slightly autobiographical [...] with elements of me in both the main characters." Publishers Weekly recommended it as a "combination of revenge and coming-of-age story".

The novel won the Lambda Literary Award for Gay Debut Fiction in 2007. Kelly is working simultaneously on two other novels; one is "another dark thriller" the other is a satire.

== Plot summary ==
Benjamin Reilly, a high school English-teacher in Staten Island, N.Y., witnesses a fight between two students. This brings him back to childhood years of bullying by Terrence O'Connell, a popular jock he had a crush on at the time. Reilly decides to quit his job, track down his bully and wreak revenge on him. He visits his parents in Indiana, where he also engages in unsafe sex with a Hispanic man. In Manhattan, he meets with Terrence and they become friends. While on holiday in Vail, Colorado, he takes an HIV test - by the end of the novel, he learns he doesn't have AIDS. Terrence breaks up with his girlfriend and slowly admits to being gay, though he won't let Benjamin kiss him. Out of anger, Benjamin pushes Terrence down a mountaintop, sending him off to hospital for several weeks. Terrence proves to be understanding, and they both decide they are now even. Benjamin learns about the circumstances surrounding his sister's death and his brother's runaway streak as a teenager. Finally, Benjamin is invited to Terrence's same-sex marriage with an investment banker in Massachusetts.

== Characters ==
- Benjamin Reilly, the protagonist. He works as a school-teacher at Tottenville High School. He grew up on Staten Island.
- Danny, his brother.
- Mary, his sister.
- Tony, his father.
- Terrence O'Connell, the bully. He went to Yale University and now writes for the Village Voice, The New York Times, Rolling Stone and GQ. He lives in New York City.
- Anthony, his first boyfriend, closeted and going out with Alicia, a Connecticut College undergraduate. His next boyfriends were Scott and Brandon.
- Meredith McBern, a co-worker of Benjamin's at Tottenville High School.
- Mario and Elliot, two boys who get into a fight at Tottenville High School.
- Marcus, the principal at Tottenville High School.
- Thomas and Marta O'Connell, Terrence's affluent parents. They live in Indiana.
- David Zimmerman, Joe DeNino, Seth Kern, Evan Sutton, James Lester, fellow-students at Benjamin's high school.
- Alex, a Hispanic man with whom Benjamin has unsafe sex in Indianapolis.
- Lisa, Terrence's girlfriend in Manhattan.
- George Pulaski, a fellow-student of Danny's while he is in high school.
- Sam, the doctor who performs an HIV test on Benjamin in Vail, Colorado.
- Barrett Hogan, Terrence's husband.

== Allusions to other works ==
- As a child, Benjamin liked to read Stephen King books. He would also watch Three's Company, What's Happening!!, Hawaii Five-O, Quincy, M.E., Barney Miller and Good Times.
- In high school, Benjamin studies A Midsummer Night's Dream by William Shakespeare. He will also study a novel by John Steinbeck.
- During a conversation with Terrence, Benjamin sums up the plot of Stephen King's Carrie. In his house, he listens to Depeche Mode and R.E.M.
- Benjamin compares Terrence's life in Manhattan to the television series Sex and the City for its overpriced cocktails and ubiquitous investment bankers.
- Terrence mentions The Vanishing.
- In high school, Danny reads Bleak House by Charles Dickens.
- In an interview with the Dallas Voice, Christopher Kelly compared this novel to The Talented Mr. Ripley by Patricia Highsmith.
