= Paula Martinac =

American writer (born 1954)

- Born: July 30, 1954 (age 72); Pittsburgh, Pennsylvania, U.S.
- Occupation: Writer
- Partner: Katie Hogan
- Writing career
- Genres: fiction, non-fiction
- Notable works: Out of Time, Home Movies

Paula Martinac (born July 30, 1954) is an American writer. She is most noted for her novel Out of Time, which won the Lambda Literary Award for Lesbian Fiction at the 3rd Lambda Literary Awards in 1991. The novel was also a finalist for the ALA Gay and Lesbian Book Award.

== Background ==
Born and raised in Pittsburgh, Pennsylvania, Martinac was educated at Chatham College and the College of William & Mary. She worked for the West Virginia State Museum and Prentice Hall before joining the editorial collective of WomaNews in 1982. She became production director of The Feminist Press in 1985, joined the editorial collective of the feminist literary magazine Conditions in 1988, and became cochair of the board of New York City's Lesbian and Gay Community Services Center in 1990. She was editor in chief of Q Syndicate, an LGBT syndication company, from 2001 to 2009.

== Writing career ==
Her first book, an anthology of short stories shared with Carla Tomaso titled Voyages Out One, was published in 1989. The book was shortlisted for the Lambda Literary Award for Lesbian Debut Fiction at the 2nd Lambda Literary Awards.

Out of Time, her debut novel, followed in 1990. She followed up with the novels Home Movies (1993) and Chicken (1997). Home Movies was a Lambda finalist for Lesbian Fiction at the 6th Lambda Literary Awards.

She published a number of non-fiction works in the 1990s, including a 1996 biography of k.d. lang, The Queerest Places: A National Guide to Gay and Lesbian Historic Sites (1997), and The Lesbian and Gay Book of Love and Marriage: Creating the Stories of Our Lives (1998). From 1997 to 2005 she wrote the biweekly column "Lesbian Notions", which was syndicated to LGBT publications across the United States. She has also written a number of stage plays that were produced in Pittsburgh, New York, and D.C.

In 2014 Martinac moved to Charlotte, North Carolina, where she teaches creative writing at the University of North Carolina at Charlotte. The Ada Decades, her first novel since 1997, was published in 2017 and was a finalist for the Ferro-Grumley Award for LGBT Fiction. Her fifth novel, Clio Rising, was published in April 2019 and won a Gold Medal in the 2020 Independent Publisher Book Awards. Two historical novels followed in 2021: "Testimony" and "Dear Miss Cushman," both published by Bywater Books.

== Works ==
=== Fiction ===
- Voyages Out One (1989)
- Out of Time (1990)
- Home Movies (1993)
- Chicken (1997)
- The Ada Decades (2017)
- Clio Rising (2019)
- Testimony (2021)
- Dear Miss Cushman (2021)

=== Non-fiction ===
- k.d. lang (1996)
- The Queerest Places: A National Guide to Gay and Lesbian Historic Sites (1997)
- The Lesbian and Gay Book of Love and Marriage: Creating the Stories of Our Lives (1998)
