= N. Leigh Dunlap =

American cartoonist and artist (b. 1961)

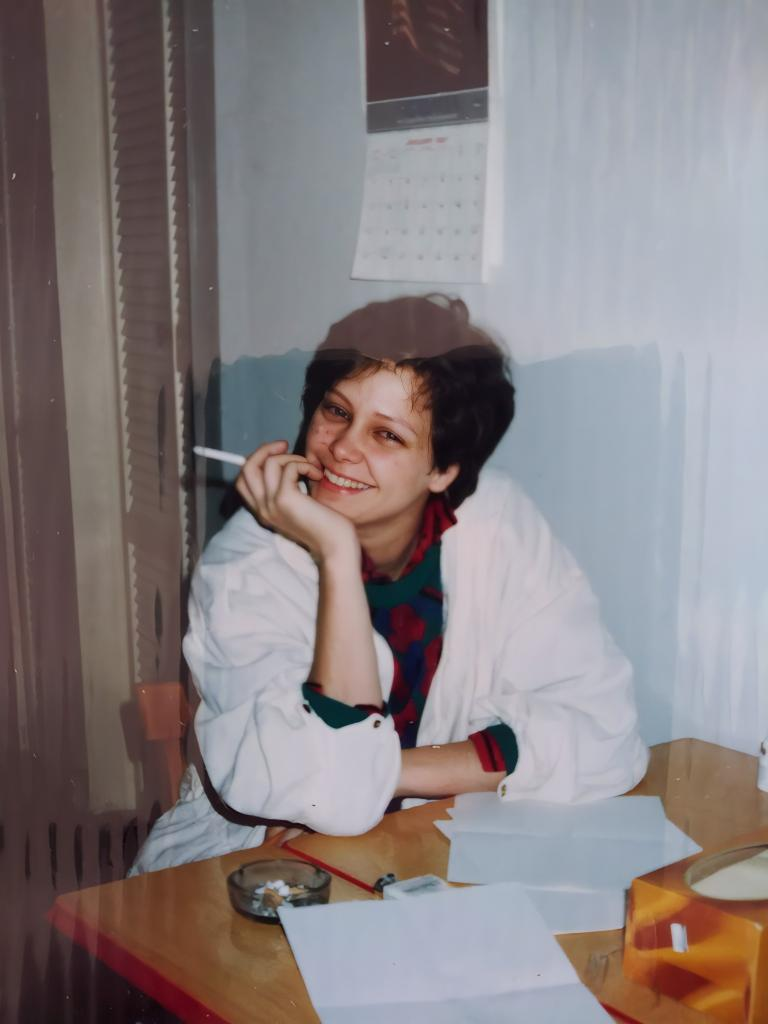
- Dunlap in 1988
- Born: 1961 (age 64–65); Lorraine, OH
- Occupations: Artist, actor
- Years active: 1982–present
- Known for: Cartoon series of Morgan Calabrese
- Children: 2

N. Leigh Dunlap (born 1961) is an American graphic designer, actor, illustrator, cartoonist and copywriter. She is best known for her cartoonist contributions named Morgan Calabrese. Throughout her career, Dunlap has published much material surrounding LGBTQ+ activism and was a winner of the 2nd Lambda Literary Award under the humor category.

== Early life and education ==
Dunlap attended Stephens College on an academic scholarship but never finished. In college, she became involved in acting and participated in some local productions.

== Career ==
=== Cartooning (1985–1995) ===
A majority of Dunlap's publications can be found in The Washington Blade, the oldest LGBTQ+ newspaper in the country. The newspaper chronicles ongoing transformations within the queer community, and Dunlap's comics do no different. She published weekly strips in the newspaper from 1985 to 1995. Dunlap's publications in the newspaper mainly follow the character Morgan Calabrese, a young, hot-tempered lesbian. Dunlap's comics heavily characterize Morgan, and she has even been called the "lesbian hero of the 90s." Some of her featured panels also include other characters, such as Page Turner. Through her publications in the newspaper, Dunlap created characters that resonated with readers while also forcing them to question their own viewpoints on various issues. While Dunlap's primary focused revolved around LGBTQ+ matters, she also dealt with controversies concerning AIDS, women's music festivals, workplace discrimination, and Reagan-era politics.

Again following the character of Morgan Calabrese, Dunlap has published two books that have received acclaim within the community. The first book, titled Morgan Calabrese: The Movie was published in 1987, and the second, Run That Sucker at Six!: the Second Morgan Calabrese Collection, was published in 1989. The first book was published by New Victoria Publishers, whereas the latter was published by St. Martins Press. Switching to St. Martins Press allowed Dunlap to gain more exposure, as New Victoria Publishers was a smaller organization supporting only women. Her books, like the publications in The Washington Blade, align with themes of relationships, life events, and softball.

Dunlap's cartoons are known for their use of humor in addressing potentially sensitive subjects surrounding the LGBTQ+ sphere at the time. Dunlap's works have an important political undertone that is reflective of society's attitudes towards lesbian relationships at the time. She aims to evoke feelings in readers through the clever use of suggestive sketches that are open to varying interpretations. Dunlap's distinctive style implements humor while not undermining the seriousness of issues in the LGBTQ+ sphere at the time. Dunlap's style of cartooning can be described as minimalist, which requires the reader to engage with the text more. Reviews have further labeled Dunlap's work as soft and cutesy, though not in a way that undermines its political undertone. She incorporates elements of queer theory through the main character's attitudes and actions concerning monogamy, lesbianism, feminism, and more. Dunlap and cartoonists similar to her significantly benefitted the visibility and power of the gay community of the time through their newspaper publications. Overcoming publication distribution issues and working within sometimes stringent parameters are just some obstacles Dunlap faced within her cartooning career. Some of Dunlap's main goals through her cartooning involve making lesbians equally visible as gay men, depicting LGBTQ+ relationships as they truly are, and tackling stigma.

Dunlap's cartoons were received well by the public and recognized as playing a role in stimulating social change of the time. Run That Sucker at Six!: the Second Morgan Calabrese Collection was listed as a bestseller in August 1989 by Lambda Rising News.

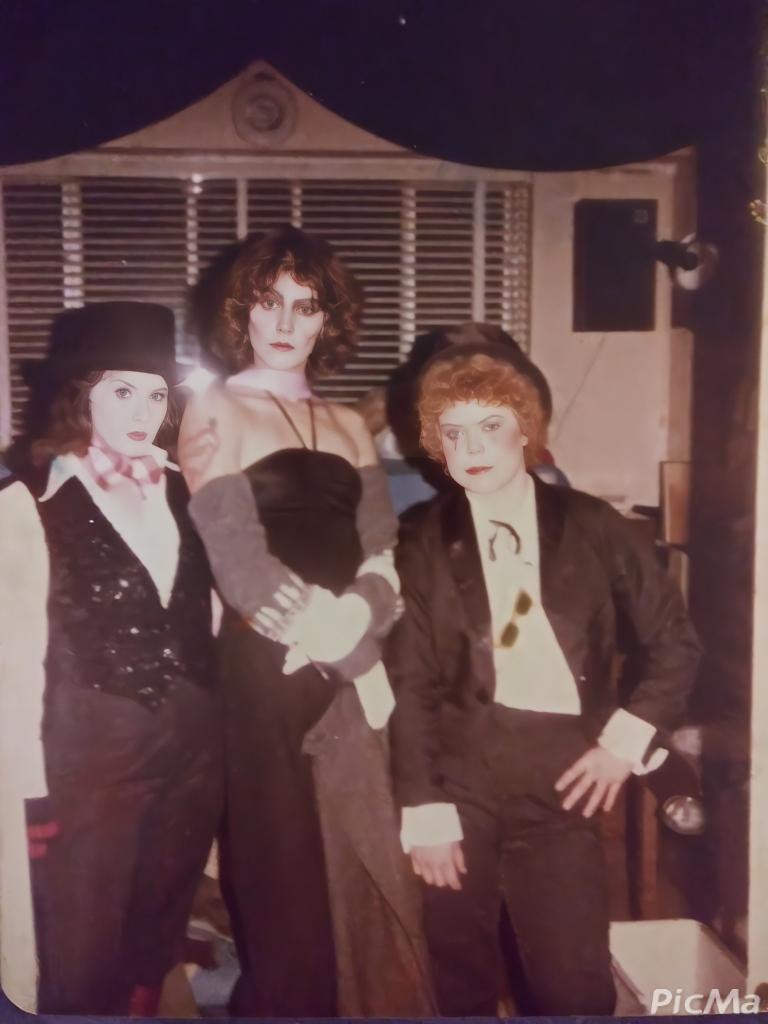
Dunlap in college

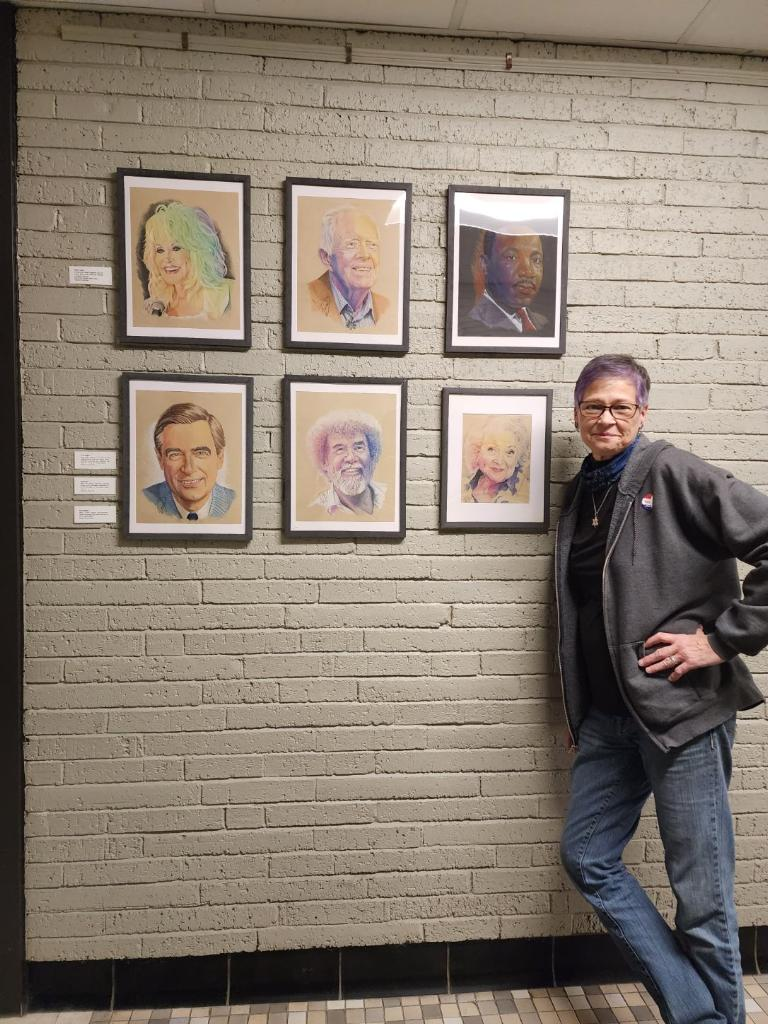
Dunlap at her art show in November 2022

=== Other works (1987–1993) ===
After retiring cartooning, Dunlap switched to other art projects, including Judaica, graphic design, copywriting and theater. She published much of her work on her Lost Tribes website and blog, neither of which she keeps updated at present.

In 1993, Dunlap published a section in a book titled A Certain Terror: Heterosexism, Militarism, Violence & Change. The book addresses a compilation of subjects, and Dunlap's contribution is titled "What exactly is heterosexuality and what causes it?" Like many of Dunlap's other work, the excerpt addresses themes of feminism, homophobia, and heterosexuality/homosexuality.

=== Theater ===
In 1987, Dunlap cofounded a lesbian theater company called "Order Before Midnight" with friend Kate Bornstein, whom she met while pursuing graphic design in Philadelphia. The company created two plays, one called the Last Summer at Bluefish Cove and the other called A Late Snow: A Play in Two Acts. Dunlap and Bornstein were able to get some of the highest profile lesbian activists of the time involved. The play follows the journey of eight women in Bluefish Cove, one of which is played by Dunlap. Dunlap is an actor in the films, playing the character Lil in Last Summer at Bluefish Cove and Pat in A Late Snow: A Play in Two Acts. The play is considered a landmark piece in Lesbian dramatic literature, and is renowned for its humor, three dimensional characters, and sensitivity towards potentially problematic portrayals. The play was shown in many women's music festivals, and the two were invited to a prestigious art festival known as Sister Space Women's Festival. Notably, this was a new kind of play considering it was a live play.

== Selected works ==
- Dunlap, N. Leigh (1987). Morgan Calabrese: The Movie. New Victoria Publishers. ISBN 9780934678148.
- Dunlap, N. Leigh (1989). Run That Sucker at Six!: the Second Morgan Calabrese Collection (1st ed.). St. Martins Press. ISBN 9780312029517.

=== As contributor ===
- Warren, Roz (1991). Women's Glib: A Collection of Women's Humor. Crossing Press. ISBN 978-0895944702.
- Robbins, Trina (1993). A Century of Women Cartoonists. Kitchen Sink Press. ISBN 978-0878162062.

== Personal life ==
Dunlap has been married since 1986, and has two children. Her son was born in 1999, and her daughter was born in 2000.

Though Dunlap has always been interested in multiple areas of art, the thing she enjoys the most is acting. The messages that Dunlap attempts to convey in her work are reflective of the experiences she was undergoing in a harsh political climate combined with the rise of AIDS.
