= Mia McKenzie =

American writer and activist

- Born: Philadelphia, Pennsylvania, U.S.
- Education: University of Pittsburgh
- Occupations: Writer; activist

Mia McKenzie is an American writer, activist, and founder of the blog Black Girl Dangerous (BGD). She grew up in Philadelphia, Pennsylvania, and attended the University of Pittsburgh. McKenzie is a queer Black feminist and writes primarily about LGBTQ people of color. She is a recipient of the Lambda Literary Award for her debut novel, The Summer We Got Free, as well as her 2021 novel, Skye Falling. Her essays and short stories appear regularly on BGD as well as in various publications, such as The Kenyon Review.

McKenzie presents talks that center on the intersections of race, class, queerness, and gender at universities and conferences across the United States. She lives in Massachusetts.

== Personal life and education ==
Mia McKenzie was born and raised in Philadelphia. She grew up in a working-class Christian family. In an interview with Elixher magazine, McKenzie states: "I come from a family of churchgoers and I was raised going to church, and because of that I have a particular interest in and connection to the stories of Black church folk, and especially the ways in which incredible amounts of queerness and equal amounts of homophobia co-exist in Black churches." McKenzie studied writing at the University of Pittsburgh.

== Lectures and appearances ==
McKenzie has visited several universities, colleges, and conferences to speak on race, class, gender, queerness and their intersections. Brown University, UC Santa Barbara, and the University of Oregon are among the institutions where she has presented. In 2013 she gave a keynote address at Harvard University to the Hispanic Black Gay Coalition LGBTQ Youth Empowerment Conference.

== Reception ==
Mia McKenzie's work has been referenced on news sites such as Salon, HuffPost Black Voices, The New Republic, and The Brown Daily Herald. In her interview with Elixher, McKenzie talks about why she started Black Girl Dangerous:

As Black women, we are always so cognizant of people’s perceptions of us, and always having to modify ourselves–our tones of voice, the language we use–to make other people feel less threatened by us. We are expected to accommodate anti-Black racism by not doing or saying anything that will scare white folks. In this way, we are asked to make racism easier for people. I got tired of being expected to do that. I decided that I would, instead, embrace my own dangerousness–remake it and reshape it and retell it–and use it as a tool of self-expression.

== Awards and distinctions ==
- Astraea Lesbian Foundation for Justice Writers Fund Award (2009)
- Leeway Foundation Transformation Award (2011)
- Lambda Literary Award for LGBT Debut Fiction for The Summer We Got Free (2013)
- Lambda Literary Award for Lesbian Fiction for Skye Falling (2021)

== Selected works ==
- The Summer We Got Free. BGD Press. 2012
- "Illegitimate". The Kenyon Review, vol. 35, no. 2. April 2013
- "America only gets enraged about gun violence in white neighborhoods". The Guardian. April 29, 2013
- Black Girl Dangerous: On Race, Queerness, Class, and Gender. BGD Press. 2014
- "Crazy". Timothy McSweeney's Quarterly Concern, no. 51. 2018
- Skye Falling. Random House. 2021
- These Heathens. Random House. 2025
