= John Weir (writer) =

American writer (born 1959)

- Born: February 8, 1959 (age 67); Tarrytown, New York, U.S.
- Occupations: Novelist; journalist; academic
- Writing career
- Language: English
- Years active: 1980s–present
- Notable works: The Irreversible Decline of Eddie Socket and What I Did Wrong
- Notable awards: Lambda Literary Award for Gay Debut Fiction (1990)

John Weir (born 8 February 1959 in Tarrytown, New York) is an American writer. He is the author of two novels, The Irreversible Decline of Eddie Socket (HarperCollins, 1989), which won the Lambda Literary Award for Gay Debut Fiction at the 2nd Lambda Literary Awards in 1990, and for which he received an NEA Fellowship in Fiction in 1991; and What I Did Wrong (Viking, 2006); and the story collection Your Nostalgia Is Killing Me, which won the 2020 AWP Grace Paley Prize for Short Fiction, and was published by Red Hen Press in 2022.

In the early 1990s, he was a Contributing Editor at Details; and he has published nonfiction in The New York Times, Spin, Rolling Stone, and elsewhere. His short fiction has appeared in Green Mountains Review, Gulf Coast, Subtropics, Epiphany, and elsewhere.

In 1991, in conjunction with ACT UP New York's Day of Desperation action to draw attention to government and media neglect of the global AIDS crisis, Weir and several fellow activists interrupted The CBS Evening News with Dan Rather. In 2013, he was involved with Queer Nation in NYC in a series of actions meant to draw attention to Vladimir Putin's attack on LGBTQ+ people in the lead up to the Sochi Olympics.

Weir is associate professor of English at Queens College of the City University of New York, where he has taught English and Creative Writing since 1993, and where he teaches in the MFA Program in Creative Writing and Literary Translation.
