= A Gathering of Spirit =

Anthology by American Indian women

A Gathering of Spirit: A Collection of Writing and Art by North American Indian Women was the first published collection of Indigenous women's writing in North America, as well as the first anthology edited by an aboriginal woman.

The book was edited by Mohawk author and anthologist Beth Brant. It was first published in 1983 as a special issue of the lesbian literary magazine Sinister Wisdom. The collection was subsequently published in 1988 by New York's Firebrand Books, and republished in 1989 by Women's Press in Toronto, Ontario. The anthology featured literary contributions from women aged 21–65, both lesbian and heterosexual, and representing 40 native nations.

Contributing authors included

1. Paula Gunn Allen (Laguna Pueblo descendant)
2. Barbara May Cameron (Hunkpapa)
3. Chrystos (self-identified Menominee ancestry)
4. Janice Gould (Koyangk'auwi Maidu)
5. Joy Harjo (Muscogee)
6. Bea Medicine (Sihasapa and Minneconjou)
7. Terri Meyette (Yaqui)
8. Midnight Sun (Anishnawbe)
9. Mary Moran (Métis)
10. Kateri Sardella (Micmac)
11. Vickie Sears (Cherokee)
12. Anita Valerio (Blood/Chicana)
