= The Last Nude =

2012 novel by Ellis Avery

- Author: Ellis Avery
- Cover artist: Tamara de Lempicka
- Language: English
- Genre: Historical novel
- Publisher: Riverhead Books
- Publication date: 2012
- Publication place: United States
- Media type: Print
- Pages: 320 pp (first edition, hardback)
- ISBN: 978-1594488139 (first edition, hardback)
- OCLC: 883297216

The Last Nude is a work of historical fiction by Ellis Avery published by Riverhead in the US in 2012. Set primarily in 1927 Paris, the book is largely inspired by events in the life of artist Tamara de Lempicka.

== Plot ==
Set primarily in 1920s Paris, The Last Nude is told through two perspectives: a young Italian-American named Rafaela Fano, and the Art Deco painter Tamara de Lempicka.

Rafaela, a 17-year-old runaway, by chance meets the wealthy aspiring painter de Lempicka and agrees to model for her. Rafaela becomes both de Lempicka's muse and lover, inspiring the painter's most esteemed work La Bella Rafaela. As Rafaela's attraction and relations to Tamara grow, she learns the high price of ambition and reality. All but the last 60 pages of the novel are told from Rafaela's point of view, and work as a fictionalised biography of de Lempicka.

The last chapters, told from de Lempicka's perspective, are set in Mexico in 1980. The artist once again takes up her brush and works on her last painting, a copy of the portrait of her long-ago muse.

Avery described why she changed character viewpoints in the latter part of the novel:

"I wrote the entire novel from Rafaela's point of view, and then I was completely taken by surprise by this voice in my head that was louder, stranger, more demanding, more ruthless than Rafaela's voice — it was Tamara's voice. And I had to try writing in it, and it just came out like a roar. Like an aria. And I was excited and scared, and I just let her speak, and ... having done so, realized that something Rafaela took 120 pages to say, Tamara could say in two lines. And that meant that I wound up cutting the book by a full quarter."

== Reception ==
Avery's second novel, The Last Nude was generally well received by critics, who commented on her evocation of 1927 Paris: "a fun and transporting travelogue. The author's effusive enthusiasm for era and place is palpable." "The conversations between Tamara and Rafaela crackle with erotic charge, while the prose, at once elegant and precise, brings scenes to life with vivid force." Several reviewers commented on the obvious passion Avery had for her subject, and The Last Nude was compared to the historical novels of Sarah Waters, and praised as "the kind of offbeat, risky book that’s threatened with extinction by an increasingly risk-averse publishing industry."

There was disagreement over the effectiveness of the second portion of the book, in which an ageing de Lempicka paints her last portrait of Rafaela: "The Last Nude's closing segment goes about elucidating some of the motivations behind the character's behavior, but the cluttered denouement feels imbalanced," although the contrast between "the energetic frenzy of the 1920s and the retrospective and cynical elderly Lempicka provides a successful counterbalance of narrative."

== Awards and nominations ==
- Finalist for the Lesbian Fiction prize at the Lambda Literary Awards
- Winner of the American Library Association Stonewall Book Awards Barbara Gittings Literature Award
