= N. D. B. Connolly =

American historian and professor

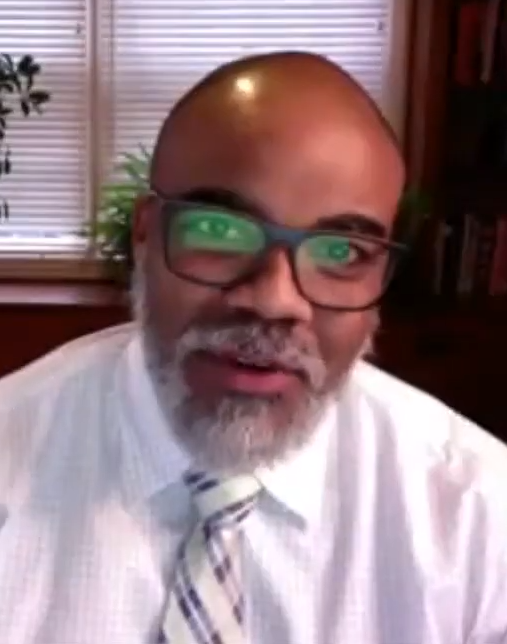
- Connolly in 2021

Personal details
- Born: November 6, 1977 (age 48)
- Education: St. Thomas University (B.A., 1999); University of Chicago (M.A., 2000); University of Michigan
- Profession: Historian and professor

Nathan Daniel Beau Connolly (born Nov. 6, 1977) is an American historian and professor. He is the Herbert Baxter Adams Associate Professor of History at Johns Hopkins University and co-host of the U.S. history podcast BackStory. He is also the author of A World More Concrete: Real Estate and the Remaking of Jim Crow South Florida. A self-professed "desegregationist," Connolly, in 2016, became the first African-American U.S. historian tenured at Johns Hopkins University, and the first African American to win either the Kenneth T. Jackson Book Award from the Urban History Association (2015) or the Bennett H. Wall Award from the Southern Historical Society (2016).

== Career ==
Connolly attended Nova High School and St. Thomas University, graduating magna cum laude in 1999. Following St. Thomas, Connolly earned a master's degree in the University of Chicago's Master of Arts Program in the Social Sciences (2000) and a doctorate in history at the University of Michigan (2008). At Michigan, he helped found the Black Humanities Collective, a graduate programming and mentoring group, in 2004, and eventually won awards for essay writing, teaching, and the best dissertation written in Michigan's Department of History. After three years of coursework, Connolly moved to South Florida and began researching his dissertation, By Eminent Domain: Race and Capital in the Building of an American South Florida. Inspired by work in Atlantic History and new literature on the history of the "Sunbelt," Connolly explored how, in Greater Miami, color-blind forms of racism emerged through political struggles over real estate, worker migration, and tourism. Particularly between the 1930s and 1970s, local politicians, boosters, and activists used housing and land confiscation laws to rewrite the rules of Jim Crow segregation. Over time, their converging and conflicting interests helped transform Miami, once a sleepy Southern town, into what many now consider "The Capital of the Caribbean."

After completing his dissertation, Connolly assumed an assistant professorship in the Department of History at Johns Hopkins University. At Hopkins, Connolly became variously active in the Center for Africana Studies; the Program on Racism, Immigration, and Citizenship (which he co-directed in 2014–2015); and the 21st Century Cities Initiative. Connolly also began advising graduate students, offering graduate seminars in American history, urban history, African American biography, and historians' applications of Critical race theory. During the 2015–2016 academic year, Connolly served as visiting professor of History and Social and Cultural Analysis at New York University. Connolly became the Herbert Baxter Adams Chair and associate professor in history at Johns Hopkins University in 2016. At that time, he also took on affiliations in the Program in Museums and Society; the Alexander Grass Humanities Institute; and the Center for Medical Humanities and Social Medicine.

Connolly joined BackStory, produced by Virginia Humanities, in December 2016. Over the preceding eight years, the program had been a public radio broadcast. Connolly came aboard with the conversion of the show to podcasting and the addition of Joanne Freeman. The show's co-hosts currently include Ed Ayers, Brian Balogh, and Freeman, with Peter Onuf serving as host-emeritus.

== Selected articles and essays ==
Beyond his book, A World More Concrete (ISBN 9780226378428), Connolly's written work reflects his broad interests in history, politics, pop culture and the digital humanities.

- "Mapping Inequality: 'Big Data' Meets Social History in the Story of Redlining," with LaDale Winling, Robert K. Nelson, and Richard Marciano, The Routledge Handbook of Spatial History, Ian Gregory, Don, Lafreniere, Don Debats, eds., (Routledge UK, 2018, 502-524 ISBN 9781138860148)
- "How 'Black Panther' Taps into 500 Years of History," The Hollywood Reporter, Feb. 18, 2018.
- "A White Story," Dissent, Forum on Neoliberalism, Jan. 22, 2018.
- "Charlottesville Showed that Liberalism Can't Defeat White Supremacy. Only Direct Action Can," The Washington Post, August 15, 2017.
- "Black and Woke in Capitalist America: Revisiting Robert Allen's Black Awakening...for New Times' Sake," Items, March 7, 2017.
- "Trump Syllabus 2.0," with Keisha Blain, Public Books, June 28, 2016; Spanish translation, February 22, 2017.
- "A Black Power Method," Public Books, June 15, 2016.
- "How Did African Americans Discover They Were Being 'Redlined'?" Talking Points Memo, "Primary Source," August 9, 2015.
- "Notes on a Desegregated Method: Learning from Michael Katz and Others," Journal of Urban History 41, no. 4 (July 2015): 584–591.
- "The Case For Repair," Parts 1 and 2, The City in History (2014).

== Works in progress ==
- Four Daughters: An American Story
- Black Capitalism: The "Negro Problem" and the American Economy
