= The Safe Sea of Women =

1990 nonfiction book by Bonnie Zimmerman

The Safe Sea of Women: Lesbian Fiction 1969-1989 is a nonfiction book by women's studies professor Bonnie Zimmerman. It was published by Beacon Press in 1990. The book received the Lambda Literary Award for Lesbian Non-Fiction at the 3rd Lambda Literary Awards, and was a 1991 finalist for the Gay and Lesbian Book Award from the American Library Association.

== Reviews ==
Academic journals reviewing The Safe Sea of Women include American Literary History, American Literature, College Literature, Contemporary Literature, Feminist Review, Signs, Women's Review of Books, and Women's Studies Quarterly.
