= Geoffrey Mains =

English cricketer (1934–2021)

Personal information
- Full name: Geoffrey Mains
- Born: 24 January 1934; Mangotsfield, Gloucestershire, England
- Died: 16 April 2021 (aged 87)
- Batting: Right-handed
- Bowling: Right-arm fast-medium

Domestic team information
- Years: Team
- 1951–1954: Gloucestershire

Career statistics
Competition	First-class
Matches	6
Runs scored	19
Batting average	2.11
100s/50s	–/–
Top score	8
Balls bowled	612
Wickets	6
Bowling average	50.83
5 wickets in innings	–
10 wickets in match	–
Best bowling	2/42
Catches/stumpings	2/–
- Source: Cricinfo, 8 July 2012

Geoffrey Mains (24 January 1934 – 16 April 2021) was an English cricketer. Mains was a right-handed batsman who bowled right-arm fast-medium. He was born at Mangotsfield, Gloucestershire.

Mains made his first-class debut for Gloucestershire against the touring South Africans in 1951 at Ashley Down Ground, Bristol. He made five further first-class appearances for the county, the last of which came against Oxford University in 1954 at Ashley Down Ground. In his six first-class matches, took 6 wickets at an average of 50.83, with best figures of 2/42. With the bat, he scored 19 runs at an average of 2.11, with a high score of 8.
