= Vickie Sears =

Cherokee writer

Vickie L. Sears is a Cherokee writer, poet, and psychotherapist. She is known for her volume of short stories titled, Simple Songs: Stories by Vickie Sears which was shortlisted at the Lambda Literary Awards in 1991.

== Early life ==
Sears received her master's degree in Social Work from the University of Washington in 1977, and got enrolled in the Academy of Certified Social Workers (ACSW) in 1980. She has served as the director of the Puyallup Indian National Mental Health Program. She was also a clinical social worker at Seattle's Community Clinic Consortium. From 1974 to 1990, she worked with Friends Service Committees, particularly focusing on lesbian/gay issues and Indian affairs.

== Writing ==
Sears' early writings in short story and poetry were included in, A Gathering of Spirit (1983), Gathering Ground (1984), The Things That Divide Us (1985), Spider Woman's Granddaughters (1989), and Dancing on the Rim of the World (1990).

She published her first book, a volume of short stories, Simple Songs: Stories by Vickie Sears in 1990. It was previously tentatively titled, One of Them Kids. The book is dedicated "to all of the children who ever lived in an orphanage or foster home and had a dream." It consists of 14 stories on themes ranging from foster children, alcoholism, coming out, genocide of indigenous peoples, racism to cultural disintegration. Rhoda Carroll writes in her review, "Sears' particular talent is the evocation of the plight of foster children, the double victims of abandonment and abuse." Carroll further adds that the voice coming from the stories is "honest, courageous, and powerful." Kristin Herzog notes that the stories blend autobiography and fiction. They express "the power of American Indian life to call us back to the sacredness of earth and body." The book was a finalist at the 3rd Lambda Literary Awards in the 'Lesbian Debut Fiction' category.

She continues to write for anthologies, including, Talking Leaves (1991), Images of Women in Literature (1991), and Literature and Language (1994). Sears has also written a series of articles on sexual abuse, lesbian relationship, and ethics. These have featured in several anthologies.

== Personal life ==
Sears is a two-spirit, lesbian woman. She lives in Seattle, Washington state. She practices feminist psychotherapy.

== Selected writings ==
- 1987. Simple Songs: Stories by Vickie Sears. Ithaca, New York: Firebrand.
- 1990. On being an "only" one. In H. Lerman & N. Porter (Eds.), Feminist ethics in psychotherapy (pp. 102–105). Springer.
