= Sub Rosa (novel) =

2010 queer novel by Canadian Amber Dawn

- Cover art for Sub Rosa's First Canadian edition
- Author: Amber Dawn
- Language: English
- Subject: Queer studies, Canadian literature
- Genre: Novel
- Publisher: Arsenal Pulp Press
- Publication date: 2010
- Publication place: Canada
- Media type: Print
- Pages: 320
- Awards: Lambda Literary Award
- ISBN: 1-551-52361-2
- Website: Arsenal Pulp's Book Page

Sub Rosa is a 2010 queer novel by Canadian Amber Dawn published by Vancouver-based Arsenal Pulp Press. The novel was Dawn's debut novel, and is a work of speculative fiction that touches on topics of sex, work, imagination, and survival. It narrates the story of "Little," a teenage girl who cannot remember her real name and ends up involved in the dark world of Sub Rosa, "a fantastical underground community of sex workers", where she enters the company of ghosts, magicians, and magical Glories. Sub Rosa won the Lambda Award for Lesbian Debut Fiction in 2011.

== Plot ==
Little is a homeless teenage runaway. Her luck seems to change when she meets Arsen, a mysterious young man with a nice car and apartment, who soon tempts her into sex. Little meets First and Second, two other “girlfriends” of Arsen, and he brings them all with him into Sub Rosa, a magical world where sex workers are called Glories and wield supernatural powers. Little is initiated into their way of life as a sex worker through several nights in the Dark, where she is repeatedly brutalized. She joins Arsen, First, and Second as the newest member of their “family”, with Arsen as her “Daddy” or pimp, and First and Second as her sister-wives. Continuing to confront the Dark, Little seeks to earn her dowry from male customers to become a full Glory, while battling her repressed memories from the past she left behind.

=== Characters ===
Little: Little is a homeless teenage runaway who is struggling to survive within the confines of an unnamed city. Her only bargaining chip is her virginity, and she is repeatedly objectified by older men. Little is discovered by Arsen, who promises stardom if she follows him to the mysterious underground world of Sub Rosa. At first Little is entranced by Sub Rosa, but she eventually understands that it is deceptive and that she must take control of her own life.

Arsen: A secretive and wealthy young man, Arsen brings Little into Sub Rosa and into his mysterious little family, where he is "Daddy", with his two other "girlfriends" First and Second.

First: A Sub Rosa Glory, First is a member of Arsen's "family".

Second: Also a Sub Rosa Glory, Second is another member of Arsen's "family".

== Critical reception ==
Sub Rosa had a positive reception from literary critics upon its debut. The Globe and Mail’s Jim Bartley remarked on how Dawn manages to subvert expectations in the development of her novel, addressing significant issues revolving around gender, sexuality, and human rights. Later in the year, the novel was also selected by Bartley as one of the “Top 5 Novels of the Year.” Both Bartley and David Chau from The Georgia Straight similarly positively commented on Dawn's approach to imagination and memory as a means of achieving redemption in the novel.

Sarah Pinder from The Broken Pencil magazine stated that despite being non-exhaustive in its representations of sex workers, Sub Rosa "definitely fills a void," as it "highlights sex workers as powerful protagonists, rather than as sideline characters or background images." Jean Roberta from The Gay and Lesbian Review Worldwide likewise noted the novel's treatment of sex workers, commenting on how the novel's genre itself appears unfixed and how it can be perceived as either a utopia or a dystopia.

== Awards ==
Dawn won the Dayne Ogilvie Prize in 2012. The award, presented by the Writers' Trust of Canada, was established in 2007 in the memory of Dayne Ogilvie. It is a $4000 unique prize given to emerging LGBT Canadian writers. The award is presented to the author as a general achievement award rather than for a specific work, but the jury specifically singled out Sub Rosa in their judging, saying, "Amber Dawn is an impressive, heart-stopping talent. Her debut novel, Sub Rosa, is a clear-eyed myth exploring the lives of young women at risk. Both fearless in its narrative and rich in its landscape of metaphor, Sub Rosa is a book that refuses to be overlooked. Dawn’s story is not just an attempt to hold the world’s darkness, but to find it some comfort too."

Sub Rosa was also presented the Lambda Award in 2011, in the “Lesbian Debut Fiction” category. It was the 23rd year of the awards. The Lambda awards are given to a novel that best represents and celebrates the LGBT community in that past year as chosen by a jury. The awards were established in 1989 and are based in the United States. In her acceptance speech, Amber Dawn was quoted as saying, “May magic and a brazen imagination be a way we continue to tell our stories”.

== See also ==
- Canadian Literature
- Prostitution in Canada
- LGBT literature
