= Nisa Donnelly =

American writer (1950–2021)

- Born: Lisa Beck; November 11, 1950; Canton, Illinois, U.S.
- Died: January 30, 2021 (aged 70); Portland, Oregon, U.S.
- Occupation: Writer

Nisa Donnelly (November 11, 1950 – January 30, 2021), born Lisa Beck, was an American writer. She was most noted for her 1989 novel The Bar Stories: A Novel After All, which won the Lambda Literary Award for Lesbian Fiction at the 2nd Lambda Literary Awards in 1990.

== Early life and education ==
Donnelly was born in Canton, Illinois, the daughter of Luther Beck and Virginia Beck. She earned a bachelor's degree in journalism from Southern Illinois University in 1972. She earned a master's degree in public relations from Golden Gate University.

== Career ==
After college, Donnelly worked in public relations for the Illinois Restaurant Association, and as a newspaper reporter in Chicago. She moved to San Francisco in 1978. She worked as an editor and technical writer at Golden Gate University and was communications director at the University of California Office of the President. She contributed columns to the Redding Record Searchlight newspaper.

Donnelly's first published novel The Bar Stories: A Novel After All won the Lambda Literary Award for Lesbian Fiction at the 2nd Lambda Literary Awards in 1990. Her second novel, The Love Songs of Phoenix Bay, was published in 1994.

Donnelly won a second Lambda at the 11th Lambda Literary Awards in the Non-Fiction Anthologies category, as editor of the anthology Mom: Candid Memoirs by Lesbians About the First Woman in Their Life (1998), with contributions from Donna Allegra, Mariana Romo-Carmona, Rebecca Brown, Kitty Tsui, Katherine V. Forrest, Lucy Jane Bledsoe, Judy Grahn, Maureen Brady, Jenni Olson, Aren X. Tulchinsky, and others.

Donnelly spoke at events including San Francisco Pride and the 2017 Women's March in Washington, D.C.

== Personal life ==
Donnelly married Denise Wallace in 2008. The couple operated a vacation rental in Igo, California. Her wife died in April 2020, and Donnelly died on January 30, 2021, at the age of 70, in Portland, Oregon.

== Publications ==
=== Books and articles ===
- "Lesbians and AIDS" (1986)
- The Bar Stories: A Novel After All (1989)
- The Love Songs of Phoenix Bay (1994)
- "Writing for Ourselves and Strangers" (1995)
- Mom: Candid Memoirs by Lesbians About the First Woman in Their Life (1998, editor)

=== Newspaper commentaries ===
- "Growing up in America's 'Tornado Alley'" (2013)
- "Secession, not partition, is best answer" (2014)
- "No, really, what about the children?" (2016)
- "What is this great America Trump wants to bring back?" (2017)
- "Transgenders fought and died—in the Civil War" (2017)
- "Politics rage above storm, but people help anyway" (2017)
- "They're Americans and they need help" (2017)
- "Challenging status quo is anything but 'un-American'" (2018)
- "Current wave of women candidates is rising tide" (2018)
