= Laurie Weeks (writer) =

American writer

- Occupations: Novelist, screenwriter, short fiction writer
- Writing career
- Notable works: Boys Don't Cry; Zipper Mouth (2011)
- Notable awards: Lambda–Lesbian Debut Fiction (2012)

Laurie Weeks is an American writer and performer based in New York City. Her fiction and essays have been published extensively. She is best known as the screenwriter of Boys Don't Cry, and is the Lambda Literary Award-winning author of the novel Zipper Mouth.

== Career ==
Weeks holds a Master of Arts in Performance Studies from New York University and has taught at The New School in New York City in the creative writing program. In 1996, she was awarded a fiction fellowship by the New York Foundation for the Arts.

== Works ==
Weeks' writing has been included in The New Fuck You: Adventures in Lesbian Reading (Semiotext(e), 1995), as well as in Dave Eggers's The Best American Nonrequired Reading 2008.

She was the screenwriter of the cult film Boys Don't Cry (1999), which was a retelling of the Brandon Teena murder.

Her debut novel Zipper Mouth was published by Feminist Press in 2011 and was awarded a Lambda Literary Award for Debut Lesbian Fiction.

== Bibliography ==
- —— (2011). Zipper Mouth (paperback 1st ed.). New York: Feminist Press. ISBN 9781558617483.

== In popular culture ==
Her name appears in the lyrics of the Le Tigre song "Hot Topic".
