= Beth Brant =

Mohawk poet

- Born: May 6, 1941; Detroit, Michigan
- Died: August 6, 2015 (aged 74); Melvindale, Michigan
- Known for: 6 publications based on experience with sexuality, abuse, growing up Native American, and Co-founding Turtle Grandmother manuscript publishing house

Beth E. Brant, Degonwadonti, or Kaieneke'hak (1941–2015) was a Mohawk writer, essayist, and poet of the Mohawks of the Bay of Quinte First Nation from the Tyendinaga Mohawk Territory in Ontario, Canada. She was also a lecturer, editor, and speaker. She wrote based on her deep connection to her people and touched on the infliction of racism and colonization. She brought her writing to life from her personal experiences of being a lesbian, having an abusive spouse, and her mixed heritage from having a Mohawk father and a Scottish-Irish mother.

== Life ==
She was born in Detroit, Michigan on May 6, 1941. Brant grew up off the reservation; however, she maintained a deep link to her Tyendinaga Mohawk heritage with her paternal grandparents where she learned the culture, language, and traditional stories. She was descended from a family of tribal leaders, including Chief Joseph Brant (Thayendanegea) and Molly Brant (Degonwadonti) from Tyendinaga. Her paternal grandparents moved to the Detroit area with the hope their nine children would have more opportunities away from the reservation. Her parents, Joseph and Hazel Brant, and her brother and sister, grew up in her paternal grandparent's Detroit home. Her father worked in an automobile factory, and later as a teacher.

At the age of 17, she left school. She went on to have three children named Kim, Jill, and Jennifer. After leaving her fourteen-year abusive marriage in 1973, Brant became active in the feminist community and came out as lesbian. She met her partner, Denise Dorsz, in 1976. They divided their time between in Michigan and Ontario.

In the initial years following her divorce, Brant worked any unskilled job she could to support her children, including working as a salesclerk, waitress, and cleaner. Her writing came later at the age of forty when she had a monumental experience on a trip through Tyendinaga Mohawk Territory with Dorsz. An eagle flew in front of their car window while she was driving. The eagle landed on a nearby tree and Brant stopped the car to bear witness at the creature. They looked at one another and the nonverbal communication spoke to Brant. The eagle told her to start writing and thus her writing career began. She displayed writing ranges of humorous to aggressive and intense to spiritual writing.

Her later years were spent as a grandmother and great-grandmother to three grandsons Nathaneal, Benjamin, and Zachary, a granddaughter, Olivia, as well as two great-grandchildren, Hazel and Luke. She died on August 6, 2015.

== Career ==
Beth Brant was published the first year she began officially writing. She was recognized by 1983 editors Adrienne Rich and Michelle Cliff from the lesbian periodical Sinister Wisdom, who asked Brant to edit a collection of Indigenous women's writing. This developed into A Gathering of Spirit (1988) where it, at first, was published in 1984 in Sinister Wisdom and then was reissued as a book many times. It was the first anthology of Indigenous women's writing edited by an Indigenous woman.

Her success continued with publication of Mohawk Trail in 1985. This is a collection of short stories, poems, and creative nonfiction. Then, she continued the momentum in 1991 with Food and Spirits. Her fiction embraces the themes of racism, colonialism, abuse, love, community, and what it means to be Native. Writing as Witness: Essays and Talk, Brant's volume of essays, was published in 1994. The essays covered a range of subjects regarding the writer's craft and its meaning. In 2003, Brant continued with her second collection of essays called Testimony from the Faithful.

Brant embraced her connection with other Mohawk people while working on Testimony from the Faithful, and pursued her oral history as well. She edited a series of autobiographical stories told by the elders of the Tyendinaga Mohawk territory. This was called I'll Sing 'Till the Day I Die: Conversations with Tyendinaga Elders and was published in 1995. This made a scholarly contribution to the continued growing of Aboriginal oral history. A year after, Brant and Sandra Laronde published a co-edited issue of the annual journal Native Women in the Arts, called Sweetgrass Grows All Around Her. Brant's writing continued to be published in anthologies and periodicals, particularly focused on Native, feminist, and lesbian perspectives.

== Activism and mentorship ==
Brant played a pivotal role as one of the first lesbian-identifying Native American writers in North America. Her work represents both her Native and lesbian sides. She also valued being a mother and grandmother. She had few role models when she began writing and encouraged Native American women writers who succeeded her. Teaching and mentoring was a significant part in Brant's life, as she taught university classes on topics like colonialism, racism, sexism, homophobia, and the survival of Aboriginal peoples. She lectured at the University of British Columbia in 1989 and 1990 and guest lectured for classes in women's studies and Native American studies at the New College of the University of Toronto. Also, Brant lectured and read at universities and culture centres across North America.

Brant contributed to a number of creative writing workshops, including the Women of Colour Writing Workshop held in Vancouver in 1991, the 1991 Michigan Festival of Writers in East Lansing, the International Feminist Book Fair held in Amsterdam in 1992, and the Flight of the Mind Writing Workshop in Eugene, Oregon in 1992. In addition, she formed creative writing workshops and groups for Native American women, women in prison, and high school students. She has always looked for ways to help others express themselves. Brant participated in a project called Returning the Gift, which was designed to create new opportunities for Native writers to share their work. It included a 1992 meeting of 250 writers in Norman, Oklahoma, including various outreach programs and the formation of an organization called the Native Writers' Circle of the Americas.

In 1982, she and Denise Dorsz founded Turtle Grandmother Books, a clearinghouse for manuscripts by Native American women and a source of information about Native women. It lasted until 1987. She was also an AIDS activist, working with People with AIDS (PWA) and giving AIDS education workshops throughout Native communities.

== Awards ==
- Creative Writing Award from the Michigan Council for the Arts (1984 and 1986)
- National Endowment for the Arts (1991)
- Canada Council Award in Creative Writing (1992)
- Affirmations Community Heritage Awards (1995)

== Memberships ==
- National Writers Union (United States and Canada)
- Native Circle of Writers of the Association
- North American Indian Association
- Lesbians and Gays of the First Nations
- Turtle Clan

== Selected works ==
=== Books ===
- Mohawk Trail. Ithaca, NY: Firebrand Books, 1985.
- Food & Spirits. Ithaca, NY: Firebrand Books, 1991.
- A Generous Spirit: Selected Works by Beth Brant, edited by Janice Gould. Dover, FL: Inanna Publications, 2019.

=== Anthologies ===
- A Gathering of Spirit: A Collection by North American Women. Editor. Ithaca, NY: Firebrand Books, 1988.
- I'll Sing `til the Day I Die: Conversations with Tyendinaga Elders. Toronto: McGilligan Books, 1995.
- Writing as Witness: Essay and Talk. Toronto: Women's Press, 1994.

=== Additional works ===
- "Grandmothers of a New World." Women of Power 16 (Spring 1990): 40-47.
- "Giveaway: Native Lesbian Writers." Signs: Journal of Women in Culture and Society 18 (Summer 1993): 944-947.
- "The Good Red Road." American Indian Culture and Research Journal 21.1 (1997): 193-206.

=== Anthologies where writing appears ===
- Barrington, Judith, ed. An Intimate Wilderness: Lesbian Writers on Sexuality. Portland, OR: Eighth Mountain Press, 1991.
- Bruchac, Joseph, ed. New Voices from the Longhouse: An Anthology of Contemporary Iroquois Writing. Greenfield Center, NY: Greenfield Review Press, 1989.
- Bruchac, Joseph, ed. Songs from This Earth on Turtle's Back: Contemporary American Indian Poetry. Greenfield Center, NY: Greenfield Review Press, 1983.
- Dykewords: An Anthology of Lesbian Writing. Ed. Lesbian Writing and Publishing Collective. Toronto: Women's Press, 1990.
- Piercy, Marge, ed. Early Ripening: Poetry by Women. New York, Pandora Books, 1987.
- Roscoe, Will, ed. Living the Spirit: A Gay American Indian Anthology. New York: St. Martin's Press, 1988.

== Bibliography ==
- "Beth Brant (aka Degonwadonti)" Contemporary American Ethnic Poets. Ed. Linda Cullum. Westport: Greenwood Press, 2004. 42-5. Print.
- Brownlie, Robin Jarvis. "Brant, Beth E." Encyclopedia of Lesbian, Gay, Bisexual and Transgendered History in America. Ed. Marc Stein. Vol. 1. Detroit: Charles Scribner's Sons, 2004. 165-6. Gale Virtual Reference Library. Web. 20 May 2016.
- Douglas, Carol Anne. "Beth Brant: Book & Spirits." Off Our Backs 22.9 (1992): 1. ProQuest. Web. 20 May 2016.
