= Bonnie Zimmerman =

American literary critic and women's studies scholar

- Born: 1947 (age 78–79); Chicago, Illinois
- Title: Professor of Women's Studies; NWSA president 1998–1999
- Awards: Lambda Literary Award; 1991 The Safe Sea of Women

Academic background
- Education: University at Buffalo; Indiana University Bloomington

Academic work
- Discipline: Women’s Studies
- Institutions: San Diego State University

Bonnie Zimmerman is an American literary critic and women's studies scholar. She is the author of books and articles exploring lesbian history and writings, women's literature, women's roles, and feminist theory. She has received numerous prestigious awards.

== Early life and career ==
Born in 1947, Bonnie Zimmerman grew up in a secular Jewish family in the suburbs of Chicago. She became one of the founding members of the Women's Studies College at State University of New York Buffalo in 1970. She was offered a temporary position as a lecturer at San Diego State University (SDSU) in their Women's Studies program (the first in the country) and used this opportunity to begin teaching lesbian literature in 1979. In 1983, she became Professor of Women's Studies at SDSU. She was president of the National Women's Studies Association from 1998 to 1999, and acted as the Women's Studies department chair at SDSU from 1986 to 1992 and again from 1995 to 1997. Stemming from her background, Zimmerman said, "No matter how the social and academic landscape changes, and no matter that I am now a university administrator, I will always be a child of the '60s and '70s: a new-left, radical-feminist, counterculture, dyke intellectual".

She credits her 1981 article "What Has Never Been: An Overview of Lesbian Feminist Literary Criticism" as the primary source that created her reputation as a pre-eminent lesbian and feminist scholar of her day. It was later anthologized in The Norton Anthology of Theory and Criticism.

In "A Lesbian-Feminist Journey Through Queer Nation" (2007) she states, "Although I do not think I will ever publish much queer or gay and lesbian scholarship, I have also been instrumental in beginning LGBT studies on my campus, as I was in beginning Lesbian Studies within Women's Studies during the 1970s."

Zimmerman retired from teaching in 2010.

Zimmerman's papers are held in the Special Collections and University Archives of San Diego State University.

== Education ==
Following high school, she entered the music program at Indiana University Bloomington with a focus on classical voice. However, when she graduated with honors in 1968, it was with a degree in philosophy. Afterwards, she earned her doctorate in English literature at the State University of New York Buffalo, While there, she discovered her feminist politics.

== Personal life ==
Zimmerman is openly lesbian.

== Awards and honors ==
Some of the awards received by Zimmerman include the Lambda Literary Award for Nonfiction in 1990 for The Safe Sea of Women: Lesbian Fiction 1969-1989, the Positive Visibility Award from GLAAD in 1996, the Most Influential Faculty Award in Women's Studies (which she received 3 times in 1985, 1990, and 1999), and the Alumni Association Distinguished Faculty Award in 2004.

== Works ==
=== Books ===
- The Safe Sea of Women: Lesbian Fiction 1969-1989 (1990), Beacon Press, Boston, Massachusetts, ISBN 0807079049. (Examines and analyzes literature specifically through the lens and themes of lesbian experience.)
- Professions of Desire: Lesbian and Gay Studies in Literature (1995), ed., Modern Language Association of America, New York, NY, ISBN 0873525620.
- The New Lesbian Studies: Into the Twenty-First Century (1996), ed., The Feminist Press, New York, New York, ISBN 1558611355.
- Lesbian Histories and Cultures: An Encyclopedia (2000), ed., Garland Publishing, New York, New York, ISBN 0-8153-1920-7.
