= Nona Caspers =

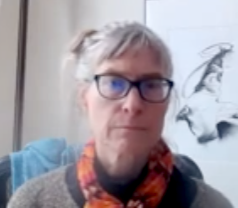
- In an online discussion in 2024
- Born: 1959 (age 65–66); Minnesota, United States
- Education: University of Minnesota
- Occupation(s): Writer, academic
- Website: www.nonacaspers.com

Nona Caspers (born 1959) is an American author and academic based in San Francisco. Her 2006 short story collection Heavier Than Air won the Grace Paley Prize for Short Fiction.

== Early life and education ==
Nona Caspers was born in 1959 in Minnesota, where she grew up in the rural Melrose area. She earned a bachelor's degree from the University of Minnesota in 1985.

Caspers settled in San Francisco in the early 1990s. There, she earned a master of fine arts degree from San Francisco State University in 1995.

== Career ==
Caspers is known as an author of fiction. Voyages Out 2, a short story collection she published jointly with Julie Blackwomon, was released in 1990. It was nominated for a Lambda Literary Award for Lesbian Debut Fiction the following year.

In 1991, Caspers published The Blessed, an adventure novel set in Minnesota. Then, in 2006, she released her debut solo short story collection, Heavier Than Air, which tells the stories of various lesbian couples in a divided America. The book's manuscript had won the previous year's Grace Paley Prize for Short Fiction.

The National Endowment for the Arts issued her a grant in 2008 for prose writing. The following year, she published Little Book of Days, a compilation of vignettes and prose poems.

Her next novel, The Fifth Woman, was published in 2018. It tells the story of a woman in her mid-20s dealing with a sudden loss. The Fifth Woman was nominated for a Lambda Literary Award for Lesbian Fiction.

Caspers has also published stories in several literary magazines, including the Kenyon Review, Iowa Review, and New American Writing, as well as various anthologies. Her work has been described as part of a wave of queer fabulism in contemporary women's writing.

In 2013, she and Joell Hallowell edited Lawfully Wedded Wives: Rethinking Marriage in the 21st Century, which collected the stories of 20 lesbian couples as same-sex marriage became legalized in California.

Caspers has taught creative writing at San Francisco State University since 2002.

== Books ==
- 1990 : Voyages Out 2: Lesbian Short Fiction, anthology edited with Julie Blackwomon (The Seal Press)
- 1991 : The Blessed, novel (Silverleaf Press)
- 2006 : Heavier Than Air, short stories (University of Massachusetts Press)
- 2009 : Little Book of Days, vignettes and prose poems (Spuyten Duyvil)
- 2013 : Lawfully Wedded Wives: Rethinking Marriage in the 21st Century, anthology of testimonies edited with Joell Hallowell (Spuyten Duyvil Triton)
- 2018 : The Fifth Woman, novel in stories (Sarabande Books)
