= Julie Blackwomon =

Julia Carter (born 1943), better known as Julie Blackwomon, is an American writer of poetry and short fiction. She is known for addressing the intersection of the African American and lesbian communities in her work. Her 1990 short story collection Voyages Out 2 was nominated for a Lambda Literary Award for Lesbian Debut Fiction.

== Early life ==
Julia Carter was born in Saluda, Virginia, in 1943. Her family moved to Philadelphia when she was 5 years old. She began writing age 14, and she was encouraged by her high school English teacher.

In 1963, she married and moved to Springfield, Massachusetts. The couple had one daughter, Robin. But the marriage lasted only three years, and by 1973 she had come out as a lesbian. Having returned to Philadelphia, she began pursuing writing there, focusing on poetry and short fiction. To affirm her new identity, she began using the name Julie Blackwomon. She chose the name because she "did not feel at home in either the straight black world or the white lesbian world."

== Career ==
In 1977, Blackwomon gained literary recognition with her poem "Revolutionary Blues," which explored the African American lesbian experience. It was included in her 1984 chapbook "Revolutionary Blues and Other Fevers." She often performed her poetry around Philadelphia and elsewhere, sometimes having it set to music. She supported her family through various other work as well, including a "hardhat job in a Philadelphia refinery."

In 1990, she published Voyages Out 2, a short story collection produced jointly with Nona Caspers. It was nominated for a Lambda Literary Award for Lesbian Debut Fiction the following year.

Her work has appeared in numerous journals, literary magazines, and anthologies, including Lesbian Poetry: An Anthology, Home Girls: A Black Feminist Anthology, and She Who Was Lost Is Remembered, Healing From Incest Through Creativity. Her writing often deals with racial tensions within the lesbian community and homosexuality in the black community.
