= Sharon Marcus =

American academic

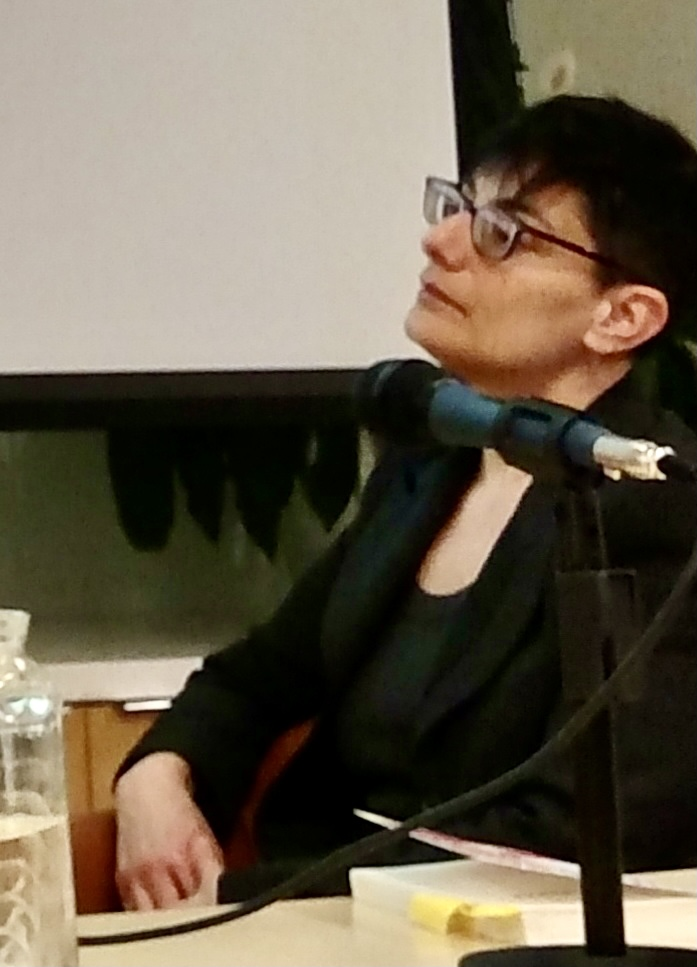
- Born: 19 May 1966 (age 60); New York City
- Occupations: academic, author
- Spouse: Ellis Avery

Academic background
- Education: Brown University; Johns Hopkins University

Sharon Marcus (born 19 May 1966) is an American academic. She is the Orlando Harriman Professor of English and Comparative Literature at Columbia University. She specializes in nineteenth-century British and French literature and culture, and teaches courses on the 19th-century novel in England and France, particularly in relation to the history of urbanism and architecture; gender and sexuality studies; narrative theory; and 19th-century theater and performance. Marcus has received Fulbright, Woodrow Wilson, Guggenheim Fellowship, and ACLS fellowships, and a Gerry Lenfest Distinguished Faculty Award at Columbia.

== Early life and education ==
Marcus was born in 1966 in New York City. She received her B.A. from Brown University and her Ph.D. from the Johns Hopkins University Humanities Center.

== Career ==
Marcus is the author of Apartment Stories: City and Home in Nineteenth-Century Paris and London (University of California Press, 1999), which received an honorable mention for the MLA Scaglione Prize for best book in comparative literature, and Between Women: Friendship, Desire, and Marriage in Victorian England (Princeton: 2007). Between Women has been translated into Spanish and won the Perkins Prize for best study of narrative, the Albion Prize for best book on Britain after 1800, the Alan Bray Memorial Award for best book in queer studies, and a Lambda Literary Awards for best book in LGBT studies. With Stephen Best, she edited a special issue of Representations on "The Way We Read Now" that has been important within the growing field, in literary criticism and cultural studies, of postcritique.

Before joining Columbia in 2003, Marcus taught and received tenure at the University of California, Berkeley.

== Personal life ==
Marcus was married to writer Ellis Avery until the latter's death in 2019.

== Publications ==
=== Books ===
- —— (2019). The Drama of Celebrity. Princeton, NJ: Princeton University Press. ISBN 9780691177595. OCLC 1059270781.
- —— (2007). Between Women: Friendship, Desire, and Marriage in Victorian England. Princeton, NJ: Princeton University Press. ISBN 9780691128207. OCLC 938345371.
- —— (1998). Apartment Stories: City and Home in Nineteenth-Century Paris and London. Berkeley and Los Angeles, Cal.: University of California Press. ISBN 9780520208520. OCLC 1015468475.

=== Articles ===
- "Fighting Bodies, Fighting Words: A Theory and Politics of Rape Prevention" (1992)
