= The Teahouse Fire =

2006 novel by Ellis Avery

- First UK edition cover
- Author: Ellis Avery
- Language: English
- Genre: Historical novel
- Publisher: Vintage, Random House
- Publication date: 2006
- Publication place: United States
- Media type: Print
- Pages: 390 pp (first edition, paperback original)
- ISBN: 978-0-09-951618-7 (first edition, paperback)
- OCLC: 226973148

The Teahouse Fire is a novel by Ellis Avery set in late nineteenth century Japan published by Riverhead in the US in 2006 and to be published by Random House in the UK as a paperback original.

== Plot summary ==
Set in late nineteenth century Japan, The Teahouse Fire is the story of Aurelia, a young French-American girl who, after the death of her mother and her missionary uncle, finds herself lost and alone and in need of a new family. Knowing only a few words of Japanese she hides in a Japanese tea house and is adopted by the family who own it: gradually falling in love with both the Japanese tea ceremony and with her young mistress, Yukako.

As Aurelia grows up she devotes herself to the family and its failing fortunes in the face of civil war and western intervention, and to Yukako's love affairs and subsequent marriage. But her feelings for her mistress seem doomed never to be reciprocated and, as tensions mount in the household, Aurelia begins to realise that to the world around her she will never be anything but an outsider.

== Awards and nominations ==
- Winner of the Ohioana Library Fiction Award
- Winner of the Lesbian Debut Fiction prize at the Lambda Literary Awards
- Winner of the American Library Association Stonewall Book Awards Barbara Gittings Literature Award
