= A Visitation of Spirits =

1989 novel by Randall Kenan

- Author: Randall Kenan
- Language: English
- Publisher: Grove Press
- Publication date: July 1989
- Publication place: United States
- Media type: Print (hardback)
- Pages: 272 p.
- ISBN: 978-0-8021-1118-0
- OCLC: 18681979
- Dewey Decimal: 813/.54 19
- LC Class: PS3561.E4228 V5 1989

A Visitation of Spirits is a 1989 novel by Randall Kenan. The novel centers around the point of view of two related characters, Horace Cross, a gay black teenager from a fictional town in North Carolina, and Horace's cousin, Jimmy Greene, a minister with no true convictions who struggles to know God.

The book was a finalist for the Lambda Literary Award for Gay Debut Fiction.

== Plot summary ==
=== Horace's plot (1984) ===
Horace Cross is a gay black teenager from Tims Creek, a fictionalized rural town set in what is presumably North Carolina. He is fascinated by science and comic books, and his family is convinced that he is going to make them proud. Horace grows up in a fundamentalist Baptist family who condemn homosexuality, forcing Horace to stay in the closet and constantly wrestle with his own identity. The story starts with an internal dialogue about Horace's desire and quest to turn himself into a bird. When his ritual for this transformation fails, he is apparently possessed by a demon.

Armed with his grandfather's gun and almost naked, he walks around his hometown, experiencing flashbacks and revelations which tell the story of his life, his struggles with homosexuality, and the failures of his closest friends and family to save him from his fate. The night ends in a confrontation with his second cousin, James (Jimmy) Greene, at Tims Creek Elementary School. Jimmy attempts to talk Horace out of using the gun, but by then Horace is too far gone and promptly shoots himself before Jimmy's eyes.

=== Jimmy's plot (1985) ===
Mixed into the telling of Horace's journey is "present" and past events which explain more about how Horace's elder cousin, Jimmy Greene, becomes the town's minister and principal of the local high school. Jimmy can't give any real advice of his own, and he has to turn to the Bible when confronted with a problem: he references the Old Testament when Horace comes out to him and, in fact, advises Horace, paradoxically, to "Search your heart. Take it to the Lord. But don't dwell on it too much. You'll be fine. Believe me."

The novel's present timeline revolves around Jimmy driving his great-aunt Ruth and his uncle Ezekiel (Zeke) to see one of their relatives, Asa Cross, in the hospital. Much of the ride involves a mixture of self-reflection on the family's history and its bad-blooded disagreements from the perspective of Jimmy and Zeke. Afterwards Ruth has an argument with Zeke in the nearby diner, and despite being a church minister who is supposed to bring peace, Jimmy is unsuccessful in ending their fighting. At the end of the trip, Zeke tries to teach Jimmy that he can't turn to the Bible to solve all of his problems, reflecting on how the Cross family needs more love instead of discipline from religion.

=== Cross/Greene family ===
The family that comprises most of the novel's characters plays a pivotal role in the novel's plot. Randall Kenan introduces the many members of the novel's fictional Cross and Greene family tree in a non-sequential manner, going back at least four generations of the family's line. A comprehensive table detailing the canonical structure of the Cross and Greene family tree goes as follows:

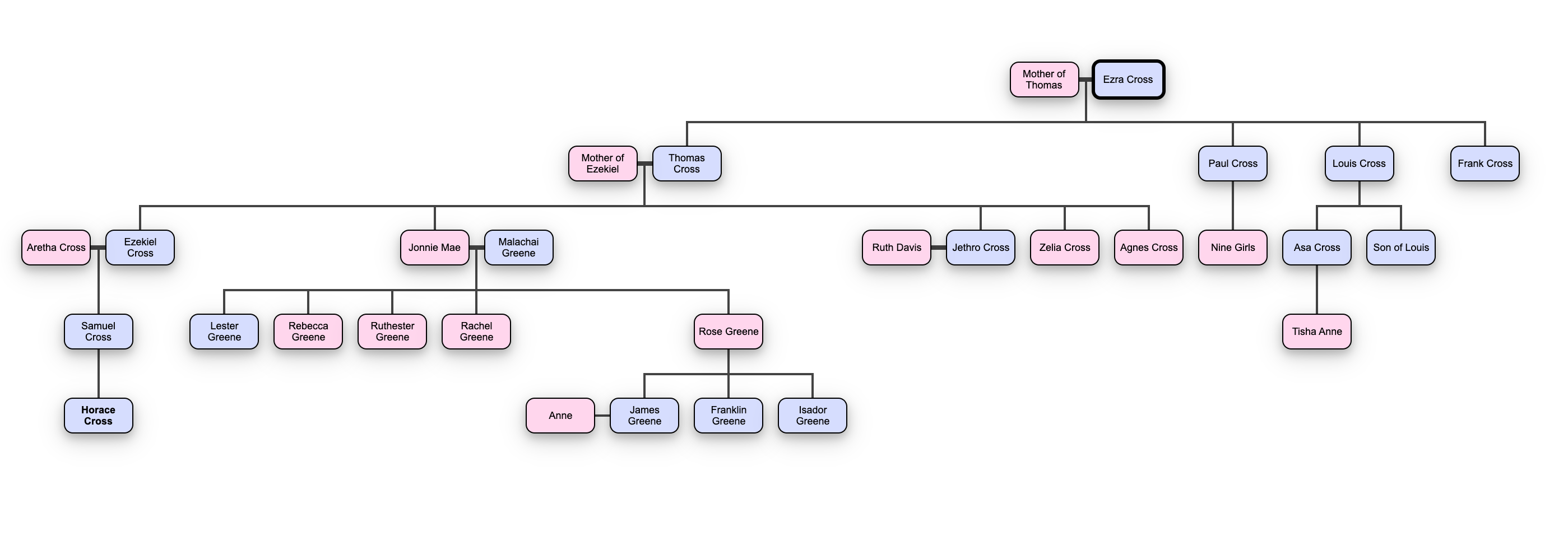
A canonical representation of the Cross and Greene family tree (Male characters are in blue tiles, while female characters are in pink tiles.)

== Storytelling elements ==
=== Plot structure ===
Randall Kenan utilizes a postmodern narrative structure, in which the sequential order of the novel's plot is rearranged, namely in an intertwining of Horace's night of hallucinations and reflections from both Ezekiel and Jimmy approximately a year later.

Horace's storyline takes place over the course of April 29 and April 30, 1984. It begins when he attempts to turn himself into a bird in the backyard of his grandfather Zeke's house, using a satanic and anti-Christian ritual. However, the spell backfires and it is interpreted that a demon begins to coerce and fully control Horace, guiding him through a full night of reflection on his failure to find love and acceptance through his queer identity. Horace is guided to visit the local church, his teacher's house, his high school, the Crosstown Theater, and finally Tims Creek Elementary, where he confronts Jimmy at gunpoint.

Kenan also uses a few unconventional story-telling elements in this story. Three pivotal scenes from Horace's and Jimmy's past are written in a screenplay style of writing. Moreover, the book starts and ends with detailed scenes of community from the past, namely the "hog killing" scene individually titled "Advent (or The Beginning of the End)" at the beginning and the individually titled "Requiem For Tobacco" at the end.

=== Script format ===
Several dialogue-heavy conversations, but not all conversations, are written in a script format. The names of the people speaking are listed, followed by their dialogue, which usually continues for 1-2 pages. Stage directions for movement or gestures, such as "(to Jimmy)," which signifies who the character is talking to, are also apparent in these sections. They normally appear as flashbacks in Horace's chapters.

== Narrative themes and morals ==
=== Queer identity in the rural South ===
The story incorporates themes of queer identity through the sections surrounding Horace Cross. The majority of Horace's nightlong hallucinations tell of the realization of his homosexuality and the subsequent negative backlash he faced in every aspect of his life. Kenan's gothic allusions throughout Horace's sections, such as the dialogue between Horace and the demon who begins to possess his body, are a means of relating the themes of race and sexuality together.

Gideon is another gay male character in the novel that is more openly feminine in school and someone that Horace develops a crush on. However, the lack of reputation in Gideon's impoverished family, coupled with his ability to out-quip any peers who bully him, has made Gideon a character who was able find a successful life outside of Tims Creek. Queer identity in A Visitation of Spirits is linked to the importance placed in approval or disapproval of those who surround the character. Meanwhile, in Horace's case, the mere appearance of ear piercings causes Jonnie Mae to shun him from the family table.

The novel explores queer identity through the lens of a queer transformation, positioning Horace’s desire to become a bird as both a literal and metaphorical escape from the constraints of a conservative, religious, and racially marked environment. The myth of the Flying Africans is recontextualized as a symbolic narrative of longing for freedom and belonging - Horace seeks not exile, but acceptance within his own community. His transformation fantasy is shaped by a mix of folklore, comic books, magical realism, and science fiction, revealing a syncretic imagination that draws from African American culture as well as popular youth media. The demon that haunts him is a manifestation of internalized shame and societal oppression, reflecting how the intersection of queerness and blackness is rendered through both horror and fantasy. His identity crisis is heightened by the community’s rigid moral framework, where homosexuality is viewed as both sin and betrayal, and his failure to conform ultimately leads to a tragic self-destruction.

=== Family history and lineage ===
The background story of the Cross family's history plays an integral part in understanding how reputation and lineage effects the specific values that the Crosses choose to uphold. Through Ezra Cross and his ancestors, the Cross family in the novel is actually derived from the white Cross family to which they owe their name to. Several Tims Creek destinations, such as the Crosstown Theater, are referenced to be the work of the white Cross family whose own wealth and reputation are directly linked to the field work of Ezra and his slave ancestors.

For the African American Cross family derived from Ezra Cross, their multi-generational residency in Tims Creek has created a solidified reputation of historical importance, one that both elevates their name and chains the family members to a certain degree of expected success or dignity. For Horace in particular, being both a straight-"A" student and one of the youngest of the family means the future of the Cross family's reputation will lie in his hands. However, any time Horace attempts to reveal an example of his queer identity, a factor that conflicts with the rural Southern traditions of religion and marriage, his family lashes out at him. There is a notion that a foreign element to the family's homogenous behavior will immediately bring down the reputation of the Cross family in Tims Creek.

The weight of family legacy in the novel is inseparable from historical trauma, as the Crosses navigate life in a community haunted by the memory of slavery and shaped by systemic racism. This legacy forms the moral expectations imposed on Horace, reinforcing rigid gender and sexual roles. His failure to conform is perceived not only as a personal failing but as a threat to the family’s symbolic continuity. Kenan links lineage and morality through the character’s burden of “respectability,” where black identity is monitored and policed through an intergenerational lens. The ghostly presence of ancestral trauma resurfaces in the form of literal and figurative spectres, connecting Horace’s personal crisis to a collective history of repression and survival.

=== Importance of Christianity ===
Because the fictional town of Tims Creek is supposed to specifically resemble a multitude of rural towns in the American deep South, Kenan alludes to and ultimately criticizes a large amount of how Christian values are wrongly applied, namely by members of the Cross family.

As demonstrated in many of the hallucinations Horace undergoes, he desires to be accepted by his family through the lens of a queer identity are promptly shot down and denied. This sense of betrayal is especially devastating when it comes from Jimmy as a minister of the local Baptist church. After Horace attempts to confide in Jimmy that he fantasizes about becoming an openly gay male, Jimmy tries only to assure him that these thoughts are temporary and that he will eventually see the error in his ways. Kenan is criticizing the intolerant and ensnaring tendencies that are brought through a misinterpretation of the Bible, one that overemphasizes any reference to the punishment of homosexuality over the more important ideas of love and family.

Kenan’s critique of Christianity is deeply tied to its colonial and exclusionary legacies. The faith practiced by Horace’s family, while a source of strength and structure, becomes a tool of moral rigidity that excludes queer expressions of identity. In a pivotal scene, the demon that possesses Horace mocks Reverend Jimmy’s religious authority, symbolizing the failure of institutional religion to offer true spiritual refuge to those who deviate from its norms. The biblical references throughout the novel (particularly the echo of the Gerasene demoniac story) function both as intertextual commentary and as an indictment of how religious institutions demonize queerness. Christianity, in this context, is not just a set of beliefs but an inherited system of control that enforces social conformity and suppresses individual difference.
