= Epitaphs for the Living =

1989 book of photographs by Billy Howard

Epitaphs for the Living: Words and Images in the Time of AIDS
- Author: Billy Howard
- Publisher: Southern Methodist University Press
- Publication date: 1989
- Publication place: United States
- Pages: xviii, 68 leaves : chiefly ill.; 37 cm.
- ISBN: 0-87074-289-2

Epitaphs for the Living: Words and Images in the Time of AIDS is a book of photographs by Billy Howard, published in 1989 by Southern Methodist University Press in Dallas. The photographs are mostly portraits and depict persons infected with AIDS. Underneath each picture is a copy of a handwritten message by the subject, either telling an abbreviated version of the story of their illness or expressing thanks to the family and friends who have stood by them. An introduction of printed text analyzes the social issues discussed by the patients and highlights some of their more poetic lines.

== Production ==
DIFFA (Design Industries Foundation for AIDS) granted Howard the money to complete the photographic element and printing of the book; although Howard holds the rights, all proceeds from the book's sale are returned to DIFFA. Howard collaborated with AIDS outreach agencies in order to meet and photograph People With AIDS (PWAs). The patients were mostly combed from clinics and services in Chicago, San Francisco, and Atlanta. After the photography was completed, each subject was asked to send a handwritten note to accompany their picture. In many cases the subject had already died by this time, and the note is written by his or her survivors.

== Plot ==
Each page of the book can be viewed as an independent illness narrative. Howard, in letting his subjects speak for themselves, transcribes their stories in an intensely personal way. The photographs depict patients in their own surroundings, each one a visual narrative of the sick person's daily life. They use their own faces and bodies to convey the turmoil that lies within. Using photography as its principle medium, the book attempts to tell the story of AIDS from the patients' points of view. The introduction, by Lonnie D. Kliever, points out that many of the personal messages written by the portrait subjects indicate where they are on the journey toward accepting their mortality. Many other messages highlight illness as the main focus rather than impending death. A consensus among the patients is that dying from AIDS is bad, but living with AIDS is worse. Whether they last a few words or a long letter, each message represents that patient's personal story.

== Themes ==
Religion/God: Many of the patients reference a spiritual connection to their religion being especially important after their diagnosis. Even though most acknowledge that they are homosexual, they cling to faith. In addition, one man brings up the idea held by some members of the religious community that AIDS is God's punishment to homosexuals. This man goes on to "pray that other AIDS patients will have a strong faith and belief in the forgiving goodness of the Lord. He does not love us any less than before - so REJOICE! GOD LOVES YOU!"

Discrimination: Even the most optimistic AIDS patients write in their messages about the ostracism they have encountered due to the public's prejudices about the disease. In the late 1980s, little was known about the virus other than it was a certain death sentence. Due to its association with the homosexual community and intravenous drug use of others, and its deadly nature, discrimination against those infected with AIDS was very common Hysteria and rumors circulated, spreading paranoia throughout the country. Many patients claim to have been fired from their jobs or cut out of the lives of more conservative friends and relatives. The partner of a man claimed by AIDS says that after his lover's death, he received some consolation and kindness from others "but not enough". This passage highlights the discrimination that gay men faced at this time, especially those affected by AIDS.

Cross-Cultural Issues: Another main point made by the AIDS patients is that although they encounter AIDS discrimination, AIDS itself does not discriminate. Most of the patients featured in Epitaphs are gay white males, but it also depicts women, babies, and heterosexual males, in a range of races and socioeconomic backgrounds.

== Exhibition ==
In 2012, portraits from the book were exhibited at Creativity and Crisis in Washington, DC. Most of the subjects had died by then. A portrait from the book of Tested Positive Awareness of Chicago at the Belmont Rocks, a gathering place for gays and lesbians in Chicago, appears in the closing montage of the film And the Band Played On.
