= Yvonne Zipter =

American writer

Yvonne Zipter is an American writer from Milwaukee.

== Biography ==
Zipter obtained her B.A. from the University of Wisconsin-Milwaukee and an M.F.A. from Vermont College. After working in California and New York, she moved to Chicago in 1981. Zipter worked at Bell Labs as a technical writer and later at the University of Chicago Press as a manuscript editor. She authored the nationally syndicated column, Inside Out, from 1983 to 1993.

In 2014, she married Kathy Forde. They reside in Chicago and have pet greyhounds.

== Bibliography ==
- Kissing the Long Face of the Greyhound
- The Wordless Lullaby of Crickets
