= Randall Kenan =

American author (1963–2020)

- Born: March 12, 1963; Brooklyn, New York, U.S.
- Died: August 28, 2020 (aged 57); Hillsborough, North Carolina, U.S.
- Education: University of North Carolina at Chapel Hill
- Occupation: Writer
- Writing career
- Genres: African-American literature; Gay literature
- Notable works: A Visitation of Spirits (1989); Let the Dead Bury Their Dead (1992)

Randall Kenan - American author (March 12, 1963 – August 28, 2020) best known for his novel A Visitation of Spirits and his collection of stories Let the Dead Bury Their Dead named a New York Times Notable Book in 1992, and The Fire This Time. He was the recipient of a Guggenheim Fellowship, a Whiting Award, and the John Dos Passos Prize.

== Biography ==
=== Early life ===
Randall Kenan was born in Brooklyn, New York, at six weeks old Kenan moved to Duplin County, North Carolina, a small rural community, where he lived with his grandparents in a town named Wallace. Kenan's grandparents ran a dry-cleaning business, and most of the time they were too busy to take care of Kenan themselves, so they hired someone to take care of him. On the weekends, Kenan's great-aunt Mary and great-uncle Redden would take him to their family farm which was located in Chinquapin, North Carolina, only about 15 miles east of Wallace. When Kenan was three years old, his great-uncle Redden died unexpectedly, and Kenan's grandfather suggested to his great-aunt Mary that she keep Kenan because she was alone. Kenan recalled the conversation, after which he remained with his great-aunt Mary for the remainder of his adolescent years.

Kenan's great-aunt Mary, whom he eventually called "Mama", became a mentor for him, and she taught him how to read at the age of four. Mary was a kindergarten teacher, so she heavily supported education and began Kenan's education at a young age. He grew up loving to read everything, ranging from novels to comic books to the Bible, and he eventually developed a love for storytelling.

Kenan attended the University of North Carolina at Chapel Hill, beginning in the fall of 1981 and he graduated in 1985 with degrees in English and creative writing. In his freshman year of college Kenan was pursuing a physics degree, but found himself confused on what to pursue because he was not enjoying his classes. He then decided to enroll in a writing class led by Max Steele, an editor for The Paris Review. Kenan also studied with the author Doris Betts, who tried to get Kenan a job in publishing in New York City. Her efforts were not immediately successful, and it was not until a few months after graduation that Kenan received an offer to work for the book publisher Random House in New York City.

=== Professional life ===
Kenan was hired at Random House originally because the company "had gotten into trouble with the Equal Opportunity Commission" and they wanted to increase the number of minorities they had working at the company. After doing odd jobs at Random House, Kenan was able to secure a job at Alfred A. Knopf as a receptionist, where he had opportunities to study his craft. Kenan worked at Knopf for only two months before he was promoted to assistant to the executive vice president, where he remained in that position for five years. While in the assistant position, until 1989, Kenan had the opportunity to edit dozens of books, which helped him improve in his own craft of storytelling. The experience working at Knopf helped Kenan in finalizing what would become his first published novel, A Visitation of Spirits, in 1989.

After publishing A Visitation of Spirits, Kenan began teaching at three universities part time. He taught at Sarah Lawrence College, Columbia University, and Vassar College once a week each, which gave him plenty of time to work on his own writing. Kenan was a full-time professor of English at the University of North Carolina, Chapel Hill. He also served as a visiting writer or writing in residence at a number of other universities, including the University of Mississippi, the University of Memphis, Duke University, and the University of Nebraska–Lincoln.

=== Writings ===
Kenan's first novel, A Visitation of Spirits, was published in 1989. While a few critics praised the book, it did not receive much attention; however, this situation changed with the publication in 1992 of Kenan's second book, a collection of short stories titled Let the Dead Bury Their Dead. The stories, based in the fictional community of Tims Creek, focused on (among other things) what it meant to be poor, black, and gay in the southern United States. The book was hailed as a revival of classic southern literature and was nominated for the Los Angeles Times Book Award for Fiction, was a finalist for the National Book Critics Circle Award, and was named a New York Times Notable Book. The short-story collection also brought renewed attention to his first novel, which was likewise set in Tims Creek.

Kenan's work is widely recognized for blending elements of Black Southern life with speculative and supernatural motifs. Though he did not become a traditional science fiction or fantasy writer, Kenan was a lifelong fan of those genres. He grew up in Chinquapin, North Carolina, where he was deeply immersed in comic books, fairy tales, and science fiction. As a child, he aspired to emulate authors such as Arthur C. Clarke and Isaac Asimov, and he remained an avid comic book collector throughout his life. His writing reflects these influences through its engagement with Afrofuturism, magical realism, and popular culture.

External videos
- Booknotes interview with Kenan on Walking on Water, April 25, 1999, C-SPAN

Scholars have increasingly read Kenan's fiction through the lens of Black queer studies and Afrofuturist discourse, noting how his use of fantasy, folklore, and biblical allusion interrogates race, sexuality, and southern religious traditions. His work is known for exploring queer transformation, historical trauma, and the supernatural as metaphors for societal alienation and personal identity crises.

In 1993, Kenan published a young adult biography of gay African-American novelist and essayist James Baldwin. Kenan frequently stated that Baldwin was one of his idols. He then spent several years traveling across the United States and Canada collecting oral histories of African Americans, which he published in Walking on Water: Black American Lives at the Turn of the Twenty-first Century (1999).

Kenan won a number of writing awards, including a Guggenheim Fellowship, a Whiting Award, the Sherwood Anderson Award, the John Dos Passos Prize, and the Rome Prize from the American Academy of Arts and Letters.

In 2007, Kenan published The Fire This Time, a non-fiction book whose title references James Baldwin's 1963 The Fire Next Time.

In August 2020, Kenan published If I Had Two Wings, a short-story collection.

In August 2022, Black Folk Could Fly: Selected Writings was published posthumously. The book is a collection of essays written by Kenan, largely published in "magazines and quarterlies."

=== Death ===
Kenan died on August 28, 2020, at his home in Hillsborough, North Carolina, aged 57. At his death, he left an unfinished book titled There's a Man Going 'Round Taking Names.

== Bibliography ==
- A Visitation of Spirits, Grove Press, 1989; Vintage, 2000 (ISBN 0-375-70397-7). Kenan's first novel.
- Let the Dead Bury Their Dead, Harcourt, Brace, 1992 (ISBN 0-15-650515-0). Short story collection.
- James Baldwin: American Writer (Lives of Notable Gay Men & Lesbians), Chelsea House Publications, 1993, 2005 (ISBN 0-7910-8389-6). Young adult biography.
- A Time Not Here: The Mississippi Delta, Twin Palms Publishers, 1997 (ISBN 0-944092-43-8). Kenan wrote the text for this collection of photographs by Norman Mauskoff.
- Walking on Water: Black American Lives at the Turn of the Twenty-First Century, Alfred A. Knopf, 1999; Vintage, 2000 (ISBN 0-679-73788-X). Nominated for the Southern Book Award.
- The Fire This Time, Melville House Publishing, 2007 (ISBN 978-1933633244)
- If I Had Two Wings, W. W. Norton & Company, 2020 (ISBN 978-1-324-00546-9). Longlisted for the National Book Award.
- Black Folk Could Fly: Selected Writings, W. W. Norton & Company, 2022 (ISBN 978-0-393-88216-2). Essay collection, with an introduction by Tayari Jones. Published posthumously.
