= Patricia Roth Schwartz =

American poet, playwright, and editor (born 1946)

Patricia Roth Schwartz (born October 12, 1946) is an American poet, playwright, and editor.

== Biography ==
Born Patricia Roth in West Virginia, she received her B.A. in English literature from Mount Holyoke College in 1968 and her M.A. in English literature from Trinity College. She also has an M.A. in counseling psychology from Antioch College.

She had a private practice as a psychotherapist in Boston before becoming a faculty member, teaching English and psychology, at a community college in upstate New York. She retired from full-time teaching and, from 2001 to 2015, volunteered as a creative writing teacher at Auburn Correctional Facility. She also teaches at the Writers & Books, a literary center in Rochester, New York. Journals that have published her work include Nimrod, The Laurel Review, Blueline, South Carolina Review, Iron Horse, Confluence, Exit-On Line, Litchfield Review, Pinnacle Hill Review, Cape Rock, Poetry Motel, and The Madison Review.

== Selected works ==
=== Books ===
- Soul Knows No Bars: A Writer's Journey Doing Poetry with Inmates (2019, Olive Trees Publishing)
- Know Better: Poems of Resistance (2012, locofo)
- The Crows of Copper John: A History of Auburn Prison in Poems (2012, Olive Trees Publishing; reissued 2017, FootHills Publishing)
- Hungers (1979, Blue Spruce Press)
- Planting Bulbs in a Time of War (2005, FootHills Publishing)
- The Names of the Moons of Mars (1989, New Victoria Publishers)

== Awards and honors ==
- Finalist:Willamette Poetry Contest from The Clackamas Literary Review in 2004
- Finalist: Sow's Ear Poetry Contest, 2004
- June 2002: ImageOut poetry award
