= Allen Barnett (writer) =

American writer (1955–1991)

- Born: May 23, 1955; Joliet, Illinois, U.S.
- Died: August 14, 1991 (aged 36); New York, New York
- Occupations: Short story writer, activist, AIDS educator
- Writing career
- Period: 1980s-1990s
- Notable works: The Body and Its Dangers

Allen Barnett (May 23, 1955 – August 14, 1991) was an American writer. Although he published only one volume of short stories, The Body and Its Dangers, during his lifetime, the book is widely regarded as one of the most artistically significant depictions of gay life at the height of the AIDS crisis.

Born near Joliet, Illinois, Barnett studied theatre at Loyola University Chicago. He later moved to New York City to work as an actor, pursuing further studies at The New School and Columbia University, where he earned his MFA in the Writing Division of the School of the Arts. He was also a cofounder of GLAAD, and an educator with Gay Men's Health Crisis. He worked for Herbert Breslin in the late 1980s, and after Barnett published his first short story, "Succor", in Christopher Street in 1986, Breslin forwarded Barnett's short stories to a friend who worked for St. Martin's Press. The firm placed one of his stories, "Philostorgy, Now Obscure", in The New Yorker, and published The Body and Its Dangers in 1990.

The book won a Ferro-Grumley Award and a Lambda Literary Award for Gay Fiction in 1991. It was also a nominee for the Hemingway Foundation/PEN Award; while it did not win, it was given a special citation as one of the year's best works.

Barnett died on August 14, 1991, of AIDS-related causes.

== Works ==
- The Body and Its Dangers (ISBN 978-0312058241)
