= Lambda Literary Award for Gay Fiction =

Annual literary award

- Description: Annual literary award presented for works of fiction exploring gay male themes
- Country: United States
- Presented by: Lambda Literary Foundation

The Lambda Literary Award for Gay Fiction is an annual literary award, presented by the Lambda Literary Foundation to a work of fiction on gay male themes. As the award is presented based on themes in the work, not the sexuality or gender of the writer, women and heterosexual men may also be nominated for or win the award.

== Recipients ==
Lambda Literary Award for Gay Fiction winners and finalists
Year	Author	Title	Result	Ref.
1989	Edmund White	The Beautiful Room Is Empty	Winner	
1989	Robert Ferro	Second Son	Finalist	
1989	Alan Hollinghurst	The Swimming-Pool Library	Finalist	
1989	Stephen Spender	The Temple	Finalist	
1989	Christopher Davis	Valley of the Shadow	Finalist	
1990	David B. Feinberg	Eighty-Sixed	Winner	
1990	Dennis Cooper	Closer	Finalist	
1990	Christopher Bram	In Memory of Angel Clare	Finalist	
1990	Kevin Killian	Shy	Finalist	
1990	Armistead Maupin	Sure of You	Finalist	
1991	Allen Barnett	The Body and Its Dangers	Winner	
1991	Michael Cunningham	A Home at the End of the World	Finalist	
1991	David Leavitt	A Place I've Never Been	Finalist	
1991	Paul Monette	Afterlife	Finalist	
1991	John Gilgun	Music I Never Dreamed Of	Finalist	
1992	Harlan Greene	What the Dead Remember	Winner	
1992	Dennis Cooper	Frisk	Finalist	
1992	Paul Monette	Halfway Home	Finalist	
1992	Philip Gambone	Language We Use Up Here	Finalist	
1992	Melvin Dixon	Vanishing Rooms	Finalist	
1993	Randall Kenan	Let the Dead Bury Their Dead	Winner	
1993	Christopher Bram	Almost History	Finalist	
1993	Bo Huston	Dream Life	Finalist	
1993	Jaime Manrique	Latin Moon in Manhattan	Finalist	
1993	Lev Raphael	Winter Eyes	Finalist	
1994	Joseph Hansen	Living Upstairs	Winner	
1994	Steven Corbin	Fragments that Remain	Finalist	
1994	Dale Peck	Martin and John	Finalist	
1994	Fenton Johnson	Scissors, Paper, Rock	Finalist	
1994	Bo Huston	The Listener	Finalist	
1995	Alan Hollinghurst	The Folding Star	Winner	
1995	Mark Merlis	American Studies	Finalist	
1995	Norman Wong	Cultural Revolution	Finalist	
1995	Joseph Olshan	Nightswimmer	Finalist	
1995	Douglas Sadownick	Sacred Lips of the Bronx	Finalist	
1996	Michael Cunningham	Flesh and Blood	Winner	
1996	Jim Grimsley	Dream Boy	Finalist	
1996	Christopher Bram	Father of Frankenstein	Finalist	
1996	Felice Picano	Like People in History	Finalist	
1996	Scott Heim	Mysterious Skin	Finalist	
1997	Shyam Selvadurai	Funny Boy	Winner	
1997	Patrick Moore	Iowa	Finalist	
1997	Michael Arditti	Pagan's Father	Finalist	
1997	Andrew Holleran	The Beauty of Men	Finalist	
1997	Dale Peck	The Law of Enclosures	Finalist	
1998	Aryeh Lev Stollman	The Far Euphrates	Winner	
1998	Christopher Bram	Gossip	Finalist	
1998	Allan Gurganus	Plays Well With Others	Finalist	
1998	Edmund White	The Farewell Symphony	Finalist	
1998	Neil Bartlett	The House on Brooke Street	Finalist	
1999	Mark Merlis	An Arrow's Flight	Winner	
1999	Rabih Alameddine	Koolaids: The Art of War	Finalist	
1999	Michael Cunningham	The Hours	Finalist	
1999	Keith Ridgway	The Long Falling	Finalist	
1999	Jameson Currier	Where the Rainbow Ends	Finalist	
2000	Matthew Stadler	Allan Stein	Winner	
2000	Jim Grimsley	Comfort and Joy	Finalist	
2000	Andrew Holleran	In September, the Light Changes	Finalist	
2000	Felice Picano	The Book of Lies	Finalist	
2000	Paul Russell	The Coming Storm	Finalist	
2001	K. M. Soehnlein	The World of Normal Boys	Winner	
2001	Erasmo Guerra	Between Dances	Finalist	
2001	Bernard Cooper	Guess Again	Finalist	
2001	Edmund White	The Married Man	Finalist	
2001	Christopher Bram	The Notorious Dr. August	Finalist	
2002	Allan Gurganus	The Practical Heart	Winner	
2002	Tom Spanbauer	In the City of Shy Hunters	Finalist	
2002	JT LeRoy	The Heart Is Deceitful Above All Things	Finalist	
2002	David Leavitt	The Marble Quilt	Finalist	
2002	David Ebershoff	The Rose City	Finalist	
2003	Jamie O'Neill	At Swim, Two Boys	Winner	
2003	Michael Lowenthal	Avoidance	Finalist	
2003	Jim Grimsley	Boulevard	Finalist	
2003	Noel Alumit	Letters to Montgomery Clift	Finalist	
2003	David Gerrold	The Martian Child	Finalist	
2004	Christopher Bram	Lives of the Circus Animals	Winner	
2004	Philip Gambone	Beijing	Finalist	
2004	Monique Truong	The Book of Salt	Finalist	
2004	Paul Russell	War Against the Animals	Finalist	
2004	William J. Mann	Where the Boys Are	Finalist	
2005	Colm Tóibín	The Master	Winner	
2005	Ted Wojtasik	Collage	Finalist	
2005	Han Ong	The Disinherited	Finalist	
2005	Derek McCormack	The Haunted Hillbilly	Finalist	
2005	Alan Hollinghurst	The Line of Beauty	Finalist	
2006	Dennis Cooper	The Sluts	Winner	
2006	Keith McDermott	Acqua Calda	Finalist	
2006	Aaron Hamburger	Faith for Beginners	Finalist	
2006	Harlan Greene	The German Officer's Boy	Finalist	
2006	Thorn Kief Hillsbery	What We Do Is Secret	Finalist	
2007	Robert Westfield	Suspension	Winner	
2007	Stephen McCauley	Alternatives to Sex	Finalist	
2007	Lisa Carey	Every Visible Thing	Finalist	
2007	Neal Drinnan	Izzy and Eve	Finalist	
2007	Tom Spanbauer	Now Is the Hour	Finalist	
2008	André Aciman	Call Me By Your Name	Winner	
2008	Samuel R. Delany	Dark Reflections	Finalist	
2008	Thomas Mallon	Fellow Travelers	Finalist	
2008	Andrew W. M. Beierle	First Person Plural	Finalist	
2008	Manuel Muñoz	The Faith Healer of Olive Avenue	Finalist	
2009	Scott Heim	We Disappear	Winner	
2009	David Francis	Stray Dog Winter	Finalist	
2009	Jay Quinn	The Boomerang Kid	Finalist	
2009	Joseph Olshan	The Conversion	Finalist	
2009	Thomas Glave	The Torturer's Wife	Finalist	
2010	Vestal McIntyre	Lake Overturn	Winner	
2010	James Morrison	Said and Done	Finalist	
2010	Abdellah Taia	Salvation Army	Finalist	
2010	Peter Gadol	Silver Lake	Finalist	
2010	Matt Dean	The River in Winter	Finalist	
2011	Adam Haslett	Union Atlantic	Winner	
2011	Michael Cunningham	By Nightfall	Finalist	
2011	Max Schaefer	Children of the Sun	Finalist	
2011	Jonathan Strong	Consolation	Finalist	
2011	David McConnell	The Silver Hearted	Finalist	
2012	Colm Tóibín	The Empty Family	Winner	
2012	R. Zamora Linmark	Leche	Finalist	
2012	Chris Adrian	The Great Night	Finalist	
2012	Alan Hollinghurst	The Stranger's Child	Finalist	
2012	Paul Russell	The Unreal Life of Sergey Nabokov	Finalist	
2013	Benjamin Alire Sáenz	Everything Begins and Ends at the Kentucky Club	Winner	
2013	Trebor Healey	A Horse Named Sorrow	Finalist	
2013	Daniel Arsand	Lovers	Finalist	
2013	William Jack Sibley	Sighs Too Deep For Words	Finalist	
2013	Kevin Killian	Spreadeagle	Finalist	
2013	John Boyne	The Absolutist	Finalist	
2013	Barry Webster	The Lava in My Bones	Finalist	
2013	Michael Lowenthal	The Paternity Test	Finalist	
2013	Richard Kramer	These Things Happen	Finalist	
2013	Paul Lisicky	Unbuilt Projects	Finalist	
2014	Luis Negrón with Suzanne Jill Levine (trans.)	Mundo Cruel	Winner	
2014	Glenway Wescott with Jerry Rosco (ed.)	A Visit to Priapus and Other Stories	Finalist	
2014	Rick Whitaker	An Honest Ghost	Finalist	
2014	Jasmine Beach-Ferrara	Damn Love	Finalist	
2014	Jason K. Friedman	Fire Year	Finalist	
2014	Allan Gurganus	Local Souls	Finalist	
2014	Caleb Crain	Necessary Errors	Finalist	
2014	Manil Suri	The City of Devi	Finalist	
2014	Greg Kearney	The Desperates	Finalist	
2014	John Stewart Wynne	The Red Shoes	Finalist	
2015	Tom Spanbauer	I Loved You More	Winner	
2015	Judith Frank	All I Love and Know	Finalist	
2015	Christos Tsiolkas	Barracuda	Finalist	
2015	Tatamkhulu Afrika	Bitter Eden	Finalist	
2015	Michael Carroll	Little Reef and Other Stories	Finalist	
2015	Keith Banner	Next to Nothing	Finalist	
2015	John R. Gordon	Souljah	Finalist	
2015	Michael Nava	The City of Palaces	Finalist	
2016	Hasan Namir	God in Pink	Winner	
2016	Michael Golding	A Poet of the Invisible World	Finalist	
2016	Andy Sinclair	Breathing Lessons	Finalist	
2016	Paul Russell	Immaculate Blue	Finalist	
2016	Mark Merlis	JD	Finalist	
2016	James Sie	Still Life, Las Vegas	Finalist	
2016	Truman Capote	The Early Stories of Truman Capote	Finalist	
2016	John Whittier Treat	The Rise and Fall of the Yellow House	Finalist	
2017	Rabih Alameddine	The Angel of History	Winner	
2017	Darryl Pinckney	Black Deutschland	Finalist	
2017	Matthew Griffin	Hide	Finalist	
2017	Joe Okonkwo	Jazz Moon	Finalist	
2017	Sjón	Moonstone	Finalist	
2017	Sarah Schulman	The Cosmopolitans	Finalist	
2017	Jonathan Corcoran	The Rope Swing	Finalist	
2017	Garth Greenwell	What Belongs to You	Finalist	
2018	John Rechy	After the Blue Hour	Winner	
2018	Nnanna Ikpo	Fimí Sílè Forever	Finalist	
2018	Andrew Sean Greer	Less	Finalist	
2018	Matthew Lansburgh	Outside Is the Ocean	Finalist	
2018	Ahmad Danny Ramadan	The Clothesline Swing	Finalist	
2018	Édouard Louis	The End of Eddy	Finalist	
2018	John Boyne	The Heart's Invisible Furies	Finalist	
2018	Joan Dempsey	This Is How It Begins	Finalist	
2019	Joshua Whitehead	Jonny Appleseed	Winner	
2019	John R. Gordon	Drapetomania, or the Narrative of Cyrus Tyler and Abednego Tyler	Finalist	
2019	Édouard Louis	History of Violence	Finalist	
2019	Martin Duberman	Luminous Traitor: The Just and Daring Life of Roger Casement	Finalist	
2019	Patrick Nathan	Some Hell	Finalist	
2019	Uzodinma Iweala	Speak No Evil	Finalist	
2019	David Jackson Ambrose	State of the Nation	Finalist	
2019	Joseph Cassara	The House of Impossible Beauties	Finalist	
2020	Bryan Washington	Lot	Winner	
2020	Jean-Baptiste Del Amo with Frank Wynne (trans.)	Animalia	Finalist	
2020	De'Shawn Charles Winslow	In West Mills	Finalist	
2020	Jaime Manrique	Like This Afternoon Forever	Finalist	
2020	João Gilberto Noll with Edgar Garbelotto (trans.)	Lord	Finalist	
2020	Will Eaves	Murmur	Finalist	
2020	Ocean Vuong	On Earth We're Briefly Gorgeous	Finalist	
2020	Lindsey Drager	The Archive of Alternate Endings	Finalist	
2021	Joon Oluchi Lee	Neotenica	Winner	
2021	Garth Greenwell	Cleanness	Finalist	
2021	Brandon Taylor	Real Life	Finalist	
2021	Douglas Stuart	Shuggie Bain	Finalist	
2021	Dennis E. Staples	This Town Sleeps	Finalist	
2022	Brontez Purnell	100 Boyfriends	Winner	
2022	Selva Almada	Brickmakers	Finalist	
2022	Jaime Cortez	Gordo	Finalist	
2022	Yang Huang	My Good Son	Finalist	
2022	Paul Mendez	Rainbow Milk	Finalist	
2023	Danny Ramadan	The Foghorn Echoes	Winner	
2023	Marcial Gala, trans. by Anna Kushner	Call Me Cassandra	Finalist	
2023	Arinze Ifeakandu	God's Children Are Little Broken Things	Finalist	
2023	João Gilberto Noll, trans. by Edgar Garbelotto	Hugs and Cuddles	Finalist	
2023	Rasheed Newson	My Government Means To Kill Me	Finalist	
2024	Bryan Washington	Family Meal	Winner	
2024	Patrick E. Horrigan	American Scholar	Finalist	
2024	Justin Torres	Blackouts	Finalist	
2024	Richard Mirabella	Brother & Sister Enter the Forest	Finalist	
2024	Khashayar J. Khabushani	I Will Greet the Sun Again	Finalist	
2025	Allen Bratton	Henry Henry	Winner	
2025	Jiaming Tang	Cinema Love	Finalist	
2025	Thomas Grattan	In Tongues	Finalist	
2025	Pol Guasch; translated by Mara Faye Lethem	Napalm in the Heart	Finalist	
2025	Alan Hollinghurst	Our Evenings	Finalist	
2026	Charlie Porter	Nova Scotia House	Winner	
2026	Adam Haslett	Mothers and Sons	Finalist	
2026	Tash Aw	The South		
2026	Sam Wachman	The Sunflower Boys		
2026	Martin Cloutier	Waiting for Something Else		
