= 15th Lambda Literary Awards =

2003 literary awards ceremony

The 15th Lambda Literary Awards were held in 2003 to honour works of LGBT literature published in 2002.

== Special awards ==
Category	Winner
Bridge Builder Award	Betty DeGeneres
Editor's Choice Award	John D'Emilio, The World Turned
Pioneer Award	Barbara Grier, Judy Shepard
Small Press Award	Kings Crossing Publishing

== Nominees and winners ==
Category	Winner	Nominated
Anthologies/Fiction	Devon Carbado, Dwight McBride and Don Weise, eds., Black Like Us	Peter Burton, Bend Sinister – The Gay Times Book of Disturbing Stories; Michael Rowe, Queer Fear II; Jay Quinn, Rebel Yell 2; Chris Kenry, William J. Mann, Andy Schell and Ben Tyler, Summer Share
Anthologies/Non-Fiction	Bruce Shenitz, The Man I Might Become	Lawrence Schimel, Found Tribe; Benjamin Shepard and Ronald Hayduk, From ACT UP to the WTO; Joan Nestle, Riki Wilchins and Claire Howell, GenderQueer; Analouise Keating and Gloria Anzaldúa, This Bridge We Call Home
Autobiography/Memoir	Betty Berzon, Surviving Madness	Paul Lisicky, Famous Builder; Terry Wolverton, Insurgent Muse; Michelle Tea, The Chelsea Whistle; Kevin Bentley, Wild Animals I Have Known
Biography	David Kaufman, Ridiculous!	Thomas Wirth, Gay Revel of the Harlem Renaissance; Jerry Rosco, Glenway Wescott Personally; Carmen L. Oliveira, Rare and Commonplace Flowers; Suzanne Rodriguez, Wild Heart
Children's/Young Adult	Bonnie Shimko, Letters in the Attic	Leslea Newman, Felicia’s Favorite Story; Linda De Haan and Stern Nijland, King & King; Andrew Calimach, Lovers' Legends: The Gay Greek Myths; Harvey Fierstein, The Sissy Duckling
Erotica	Tristan Taormino, ed., Best Lesbian Erotica 2003	Leslea Newman, Bedroom Eyes; Richard Labonté, Best Gay Erotica 2003; Bob Vickery, Cocksure; Stephen Greco, The Sperm Engine
Gay Fiction	Jamie O'Neill, At Swim, Two Boys	Michael Lowenthal, Avoidance; Jim Grimsley, Boulevard; Noel Alumit, Letters to Montgomery Clift; David Gerrold, The Martian Child
Gay Mystery	Christopher Rice, The Snow Garden	Michael Craft, Hot Spot; Greg Herren, Murder in the Rue Dauphine; Dorien Grey, The Hired Man; Drew Gummerson, The Lodger
Gay Poetry	J. D. McClatchy, Hazmat	Krandall Kraus, The Christmas Poems; Rafael Campo, Landscape with Human Figure; Reginald Harris, Ten Tongues; David Groff, Theory of Devolution
Humor	Dan Savage, Skipping Towards Gomorrah	Donald F. Reuter, Gaydar; Mo Brownsey, Is It a Date or Just Coffee?; Dennis Hensley, Screening Party; Alisa Surkis and Monica Nolan, The Big Book of Lesbian Horse Stories
Lesbian Fiction	Sarah Waters, Fingersmith	Carol Anshaw, Lucky in the Corner; Lynn Breedlove, Godspeed; Nicola Griffith, Stay; Lydia Kwa, This Place Called Absence
Lesbian Mystery	Elizabeth Woodcraft, Good Bad Woman	Claire McNab, Accidental Murder; Lauren Maddison, Death by Prophecy; Ellen Hart, Immaculate Midnight; Heather Dune Macadam, The Weeping Buddha
Lesbian Poetry	Ellen Bass, Mules of Love	C. C. Carter, Body Language; Eloise Klein Healy, Passing; Melanie Braverman, Red; Jenny Factor, Unraveling
LGBT Studies	Neil Miller, Sex-Crime Panic	Craig Rimmerman, From Identity to Politics; Colm Toibin, Love in a Dark Time; Ruth Vanita, Queering India; David Nimmons, Soul Beneath the Skin
Romance	Andrew W. M. Beierle, The Winter of Our Discothèque	Jon Jeffrey, Boyfriend Material; Orland Outland, Different People; Nancy Garden, Nora and Liz; Leslea Newman, She Loves Me, She Loves Me Not
Science fiction, fantasy or horror	Michael Rowe, ed., Queer Fear II	Katherine V. Forrest, Daughters of an Amber Noon; Laura Adams, Seeds of Fire; Randy Boyd, The Devil Inside; Cecilia Tan, ed., Wired Hard 3
Spirituality	Geoffrey Duncan, Courage to Love	Lawrence Schimel, Found Tribe; Andrew Calimach, Lovers' Legends: The Gay Greek Myths; David Shneer and Caryn Aviv, Queer Jews; Robert E. Goss, Queering Christ
Transgender	Noelle Howey, Dress Codes	Chloe Brushwood Rose and Anna Camilleri, Brazen Femme; Joan Nestle, Riki Wilchins and Claire Howell, GenderQueer; Jeffrey Eugenides, Middlesex; T Cooper, Some of the Parts
Visual arts	Dominique Fernandez, A Hidden Love	Tom Bianchi, On the Couch – Volume One; Thomas Waugh, Out/Lines; Richard Meyer, Outlaw Representation; Justin Spring, Paul Cadmus: The Male Nude
