= 6th Lambda Literary Awards =

1994 literary awards ceremony

The 6th Lambda Literary Awards were held in 1994, to honour works of LGBT literature published in 1993.

== Special awards ==
Category	Winner
Editor's Choice	Coleman Dowell, A Star Bright Lie
Publisher Service	Michael Denneny, St. Martin's Press

== Nominees and winners ==
6th Lambda Literary Awards winners and finalists
Category	Author	Title	Result
Anthologies	Henry Abelove, Michele Aina Barale, and David Halperin	Lesbian and Gay Studies Reader	Winner
Anthologies	Raymond Luczak	Eyes of Desire	Finalist
Anthologies	Leslea Newman and Annette Hegel	Saturday is Pattyday	Finalist
Anthologies	Julia Penelope and Susan Wolfe	Lesbian Culture	Finalist
Anthologies	Bennett L. Singer	Growing Up Gay	Finalist
Anthologies	Arlene Stein	Sisters, Sexperts, and Queers	Finalist
Children's/Young Adult	Hilary Mullins	The Cat Came Back	Winner
Children's/Young Adult	Rik Isensee	We’re Not Alone	Finalist
Children's/Young Adult	Christina Salat	Living in Secret	Finalist
Children's/Young Adult	Michael Willhoite	Uncle What-Is-It Is Coming To Visit!!	Finalist
Drama	Tony Kushner	Angels in America: Millennium Approaches	Winner
Drama	Claudia Allen	She’s Always Liked the Girls Best	Finalist
Drama	William Finn	Falsettos	Finalist
Drama	Larry Kramer	The Destiny of Me	Finalist
Drama	Julia Willis	We Oughta Be in Pictures	Finalist
Gay Biography/Autobiography	Edmund White	Genet	Winner
Gay Biography/Autobiography	Reinaldo Arenas	Before Night Falls	Finalist
Gay Biography/Autobiography	James Broughton	Coming Unbuttoned	Finalist
Gay Biography/Autobiography	Lars Eighner	Travels With Lizbeth	Finalist
Gay Biography/Autobiography	Brad Gooch	City Poet	Finalist
Gay Fiction	Joseph Hansen	Living Upstairs	Winner
Gay Fiction	Steven Corbin	Fragments that Remain	Finalist
Gay Fiction	Bo Huston	The Listener	Finalist
Gay Fiction	Fenton Johnson	Scissors, Paper, Rock	Finalist
Gay Fiction	Dale Peck	Martin and John	Finalist
Gay Mystery	Steven Saylor	Catilina's Riddle	Winner
Gay Mystery	George Baxt	Mae West Murder Case	Finalist
Gay Mystery	John Peyton Cooke	Torsos	Finalist
Gay Mystery	Joseph Hansen	Bohannon’s Country	Finalist
Gay Mystery	Grant Michaels	Dead on Your Feet	Finalist
Gay Poetry	Michael Klein	1990	Winner
Gay Poetry	James Schuyler	Collected Poems	Finalist
Gay Poetry	William Bory	Orpheus in his Underwear	Finalist
Gay Poetry	Carl Cook	Tranquil Lake of Love	Finalist
Gay Poetry	Mark Doty	My Alexandria	Finalist
Gay Studies	Randy Shilts	Conduct Unbecoming: Gays and Lesbians in the US Military	Winner
Gay Studies	Martin Duberman	Stonewall	Finalist
Gay Studies	Bruce Bawer	A Place at the Table	Finalist
Gay Studies	Wayne Koestenbaum	The Queen’s Throat	Finalist
Gay Studies	Esther Newman	Cherry Grove/Fire Island	Finalist
Humor	Alison Bechdel	Spawn of Dykes to Watch Out For	Winner
Humor	Charles Busch	Whores of Lost Atlantis	Finalist
Humor	Diane DiMassa	Hothead Paisan	Finalist
Humor	Robert Rodi	Closet Case	Finalist
Humor	Michael Willhoite	Members of the Tribe	Finalist
Lesbian Biography/Autobiography	Josyane Savigneau	Marguerite Yourcenar	Winner
Lesbian Biography/Autobiography	Phyllis Burke	Family Values	Finalist
Lesbian Biography/Autobiography	Rose Gladney	How Am I To Be Heard: Letters of Lillian Smith	Finalist
Lesbian Biography/Autobiography	Jewelle Gomez	Forty-Three Septembers	Finalist
Lesbian Biography/Autobiography	David Sweetman	Mary Renault	Finalist
Lesbian Fiction	Jeanette Winterson	Written on the Body	Winner
Lesbian Fiction	Leslie Feinberg	Stone Butch Blues	Finalist
Lesbian Fiction	Jenifer Levin	Sea of Light	Finalist
Lesbian Fiction	Paula Martinac	Home Movies	Finalist
Lesbian Fiction	Joan Nestle and Naomi Holoch	Women on Women 2	Finalist
Lesbian Mystery	Mary Wings	Divine Victim	Winner
Lesbian Mystery	Nikki Baker	Long Goodbyes	Finalist
Lesbian Mystery	Mabel Maney	Case of the Not-So-Nice Nurse	Finalist
Lesbian Mystery	Sandra Scoppettone	I’ll Be Leaving You Always	Finalist
Lesbian Mystery	Barbara Wilson	Trouble in Transylvania	Finalist
Lesbian Poetry	Audre Lorde	The Marvelous Arithmetics of Distance	Winner
Lesbian Poetry	Cheryl Clarke	Experimental Love Poetry	Finalist
Lesbian Poetry	Cherrie Moraga	The Last Generation	Finalist
Lesbian Poetry	Kate Rushin	The Black Back-Ups	Finalist
Lesbian Poetry	May Sarton	Collected Poems (1930-1993)	Finalist
Lesbian Studies	Elizabeth Lapovsky Kennedy and Madeline Davis	Boots of Leather, Slippers of Gold	Winner
Lesbian Studies	Terry Castle	The Apparitional Lesbian	Finalist
Lesbian Studies	Judy Grahn	Blood, Bread, and Roses	Finalist
Lesbian Studies	Adrienne Rich	What Is Found There	Finalist
Lesbian Studies	Andrea Weiss	Vampires & Violets	Finalist
Science fiction, fantasy or horror	Starhawk	The Fifth Sacred Thing	Winner
Science fiction, fantasy or horror	Poppy Z. Brite	Drawing Blood	Finalist
Science fiction, fantasy or horror	Sybil Claiborne	In the Garden of Dead Cars	Finalist
Science fiction, fantasy or horror	Jay B. Laws	The Unfinished	Finalist
Science fiction, fantasy or horror	Melissa Scott	Burning Bright	Finalist
Small Press	Leslie Feinberg	Stone Butch Blues	Winner
Small Press	Other Countries	Sojourner	Winner
Small Press	Raymond Luczak	Eyes of Desire	Finalist
Small Press	Denise Ohio	Blue	Finalist
Small Press	Ratti Rakesh	Lotus of Another Color	Finalist
