= 1st Lambda Literary Awards =

1989 literary awards ceremony

The 1st Lambda Literary Awards were held in 1989 to honour works of LGBT literature published in 1988.

== Special awards ==
| Category | Winner |
|---|---|
| Editor's Choice | Karen Thompson and Julie Andrzejewski, Why Can’t Sharon Kowalski Come Home? |
| Publisher Service | Sasha Alyson, Alyson Books |

== Nominees and winners ==
| Category | Author | Title | Result |
|---|---|---|---|
| AIDS Literature | Paul Monette | Borrowed Time: An AIDS Memoir | Winner |
| AIDS Literature | Emmanuel Dreuilhe | Mortal Embrace: Living with AIDS | Finalist |
| AIDS Literature | Andrew Holleran | Ground Zero | Finalist |
| AIDS Literature | Ines Rieder and Patricia Ruppelt | AIDS: The Women | Finalist |
| AIDS Literature | Cindy Ruskin , Matt Herron, and Deborah Zemke | The Quilt | Finalist |
| Gay Debut Fiction | Alan Hollinghurst | The Swimming Pool Library | Winner |
| Gay Debut Fiction | C.F. Borgman | River Road | Finalist |
| Gay Debut Fiction | Russell A. Brown | Sherlock Holmes and the Mysterious Friend of Oscar Wilde | Finalist |
| Gay Debut Fiction | Joe Keenan | Blue Heaven | Finalist |
| Gay Debut Fiction | Stan Leventhal | Mountain Climbing in Sheridan Square | Finalist |
| Gay Fiction | Edmund White | The Beautiful Room Is Empty | Winner |
| Gay Fiction | Christopher Davis | Valley of the Shadow | Finalist |
| Gay Fiction | Robert Ferro | Second Son | Finalist |
| Gay Fiction | Alan Hollinghurst | The Swimming Pool Library | Finalist |
| Gay Fiction | Stephen Spender | The Temple | Finalist |
| Gay Mystery/Science Fiction | Michael Nava | Golden Boy | Winner |
| Gay Mystery/Science Fiction | George Baxt | Who’s Next | Finalist |
| Gay Mystery/Science Fiction | Michael Bishop | Unicorn Mountain | Finalist |
| Gay Mystery/Science Fiction | Joseph Hansen | Obedience | Finalist |
| Gay Mystery/Science Fiction | Donald Ward | Death Takes the Stage | Finalist |
| Gay Non-Fiction | Paul Monette | Borrowed Time: An AIDS Memoir | Winner |
| Gay Non-Fiction | Betty Berzon | Permanent Partners | Finalist |
| Gay Non-Fiction | Warren Blumenfeld and Diane Raymond | Looking At Gay and Lesbian Life | Finalist |
| Gay Non-Fiction | Eric Marcus | The Male Couple’s Guide to Living Together | Finalist |
| Gay Non-Fiction | Will Roscoe | Living the Spirit | Finalist |
| Gay Small Press | Ahmad al-Tifashi with Edward A. Lacey (trans.) | The Delight of Hearts, or What You Will Not Find in Any Book | Winner |
| Gay Small Press | Michael Nava | Golden Boy | Winner |
| Gay Small Press | Thomas Cowan | Gay Men & Women Who Enriched the World | Finalist |
| Gay Small Press | Charles Jurrist | Shadows of Love: American Gay Fiction | Finalist |
| Gay Small Press | Leigh W. Rutledge | Unnatural Quotations | Finalist |
| Lesbian Debut Fiction | Madelyn Arnold | Bird-Eyes | Winner |
| Lesbian Debut Fiction | Joyce Bright | Sunday’s Child | Finalist |
| Lesbian Debut Fiction | Judy Grahn | Mundane’s World | Finalist |
| Lesbian Debut Fiction | Denise Ohio | The Finer Grain | Finalist |
| Lesbian Debut Fiction | Katherine Sturtevant | A Mistress Moderately Fair | Finalist |
| Lesbian Fiction | Dorothy Allison | Trash: Short Stories | Winner |
| Lesbian Fiction | Rita Mae Brown | Bingo | Finalist |
| Lesbian Fiction | Jan Clausen | The Prosperine Papers | Finalist |
| Lesbian Fiction | Camarin Grae | The Secret in the Bird | Finalist |
| Lesbian Fiction | Sarah Schulman | After Delores | Finalist |
| Lesbian Mystery/Science Fiction | Antoinette Azolakov | Skiptrace | Winner |
| Lesbian Mystery/Science Fiction | Sandy Bayer | The Crystal Curtain | Finalist |
| Lesbian Mystery/Science Fiction | Judy Grahn | Mundane’s World | Finalist |
| Lesbian Mystery/Science Fiction | Dolores Klaich | Heavy Gilt | Finalist |
| Lesbian Mystery/Science Fiction | Claire McNab | Lessons in Murder | Finalist |
| Lesbian Non-Fiction | Sarah Lucia Hoagland | Lesbian Ethics: Toward New Value | Winner |
| Lesbian Non-Fiction | Betty Berzon | Permanent Partners | Finalist |
| Lesbian Non-Fiction | Karla Jay | The Amazon and the Page: Natalie Clifford Barney and Renee Vivien | Finalist |
| Lesbian Non-Fiction | Audre Lorde | A Burst of Light | Finalist |
| Lesbian Non-Fiction | Karen Thompson and Julie Andrzejewski | Why Can’t Sharon Kowalski Come Home? | Finalist |
| Lesbian Small Press | Dorothy Allison | Trash: Short Stories | Winner |
| Lesbian Small Press | Alison Bechdel | More Dykes to Watch Out For | Finalist |
| Lesbian Small Press | Pat Califia | Macho Sluts | Finalist |
| Lesbian Small Press | Karen Thompson and Julie Andrzejewski | Why Can’t Sharon Kowalski Come Home? | Finalist |
| Lesbian Small Press | Andrea Weiss and Greta Schiller | Before Stonewall | Finalist |
| Poetry | Carl Morse and Joan Larkin (eds.) | Gay & Lesbian Poetry in our Time | Winner |
| Poetry | Josephine Balmer | Sappho: Poems and Fragments | Finalist |
| Poetry | James Merrill | The Inner Room | Finalist |
| Poetry | Paul Monette | Love Alone: Eighteen Elegies for Rog | Finalist |
| Poetry | May Sarton | The Silence Now | Finalist |
