= Scott Heim =

American novelist

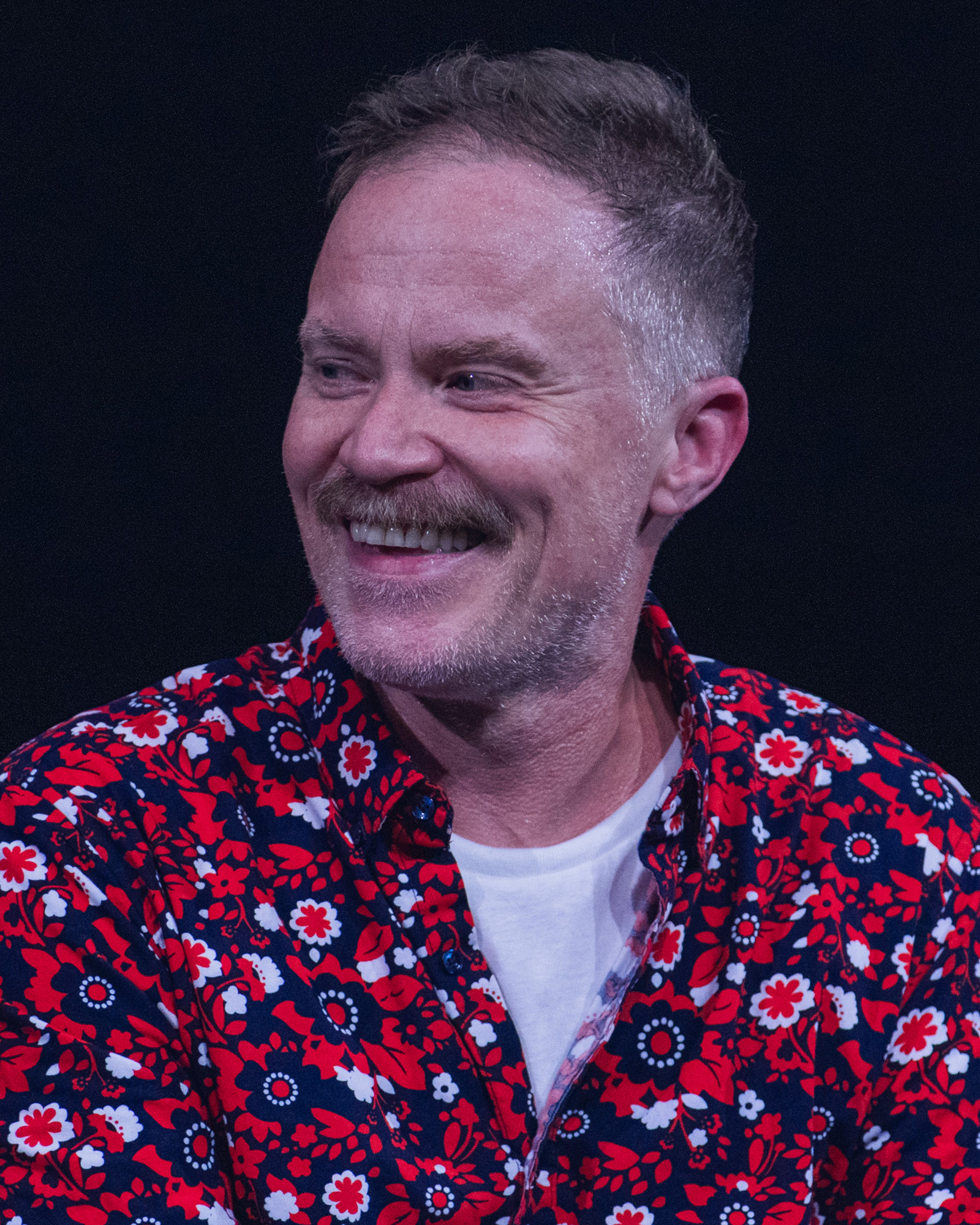
- Heim in 2025
- Born: September 26, 1966 (age 60); Hutchinson, Kansas, U.S.
- Occupations: Novelist; poet; editor
- Partner: Michael Lowenthal
- Writing career
- Period: 1995–present
- Genre: Literary Fiction
- Subjects: Memory, sex, childhood trauma
- Notable works: Mysterious Skin (1995); We Disappear (2008)
- Notable awards: Lambda Literary Award for Fiction, 2009
- Website: scottheim.com

Scott Heim (born September 26, 1966) is an American novelist from Hutchinson, Kansas, currently living in Massachusetts. Heim's first novel, Mysterious Skin, was published in 1995.

== Biography ==
Scott Heim was born in Hutchinson, Kansas, in 1966. He attended the University of Kansas in Lawrence, earning a B.A. in English and art history in 1989 and an M.A. in English literature in 1991. He attended the M.F.A. program in Writing at Columbia University, where he wrote stories that evolved into his first novel, Mysterious Skin. HarperCollins published that book in 1996, and Heim followed it with another novel, In Awe, about a makeshift family of Kansas misfits, in 1997. Kirkus Reviews called it a "disappointing follow-up to Mysterious Skin." In Awe, however, won the 1998 Firecracker Alternative Book Award for Fiction. It was also a finalist for the 1998 Stonewall Book Award in Literature.

In 2008, his novel We Disappear was published. Publishers Weekly described it as "Taut and beautifully clear, the writing at times recalls that of Paul Auster," but added "the plot ends in a place less interesting than where it began."

In 2012, Heim began publishing a series of music-related nonfiction collections called "The First Time I Heard" series, for which he serves as editor. In these books, musicians and writers tell their stories of when they first heard an iconic band or artist.

Heim won fellowships to the London Arts Board as their International Writer-in-Residence, and to the Sundance Screenwriters' Lab for his adaptation of Mysterious Skin. He is also the author of a book of poems, Saved From Drowning (1993).

Mysterious Skin was adapted for the stage by playwright Prince Gomolvilas, premiering in San Francisco. It was subsequently adapted into a film of the same name by director Gregg Araki and Antidote Films. The movie starred Joseph Gordon-Levitt, Brady Corbet, Elisabeth Shue, Michelle Trachtenberg, and Mary Lynn Rajskub.

After living 11 years in New York, Heim relocated to Boston in 2002 with his boyfriend, writer Michael Lowenthal.

== Works ==
=== Novels ===
- Mysterious Skin (1996)
- In Awe (1997)
- We Disappear (2008)

=== Poetry ===
- Saved From Drowning (1993)

=== Editor ===
- The First Time I Heard Joy Division / New Order (2012)
- The First Time I Heard Cocteau Twins (2012)
- The First Time I Heard David Bowie (2012)
- The First Time I Heard The Smiths (2012)
- The First Time I Heard Kate Bush (2012)
- The First Time I Heard My Bloody Valentine (2014)

=== Contributor ===
- Discontents, edited by Dennis Cooper (1994)
- Waves: An Anthology of New Gay Fiction, edited by Ethan Mordden (1994)
- In the Nursery, Scatter (text for compilation CD) (1995)
- Best American Gay Fiction (1996)
- Boys Like Us: Gay Writers Tell Their Coming Out Stories, edited by Patrick Merla (1996)
- Personals: Dreams and Nightmares from the Lives of 20 Young Writers, edited by Thomas Beller (1998)
- Best American Gay Fiction 3 (1998)
- Obsessed: A Flesh and the Word Collection of Erotic Memoirs, edited by Michael Lowenthal (1999)
- Circa 2000: Gay Fiction at the Millennium (1999)
- Something Inside: Conversations With Gay Fiction Writers, edited by Philip Gambone (1999)
- The Hot Spots: The Best Erotic Writing in Modern Fiction (2001)
- The Book of Lists: Horror, edited by Amy Wallace, Del Howison, and Scott Bradley (2008)
- Travels in a Gay Nation: Portraits of LGBTQ Americans (2010)
- David Hilliard: Highway of Thought (exhibition catalogue text for photographer David Hilliard) (2010)
- Hood, Recollected (text for 6-disc compilation box set) (2012)
- epic45, May Your Heart Be the Map (liner notes for album reissue) (2017)

== Filmography ==
- Mysterious Skin (novel basis) (2004)
