= Lambda Literary Foundation =

LGBT literary organization

- Nickname: Lambda Literary
- Established: 1997
- Type: LGBTQ literary organization
- Location: New York, NY
- Services: Lambda Literary Award; Writers' Retreat for Emerging LGBTQ Voices; LGBTQ Writers in Schools
- Executive Director: Jozie Clapp
- Website: lambdaliterary.org

The Lambda Literary Foundation (also known as Lambda Literary) is an American LGBTQ literary organization whose mission is to nurture and advocate for LGBTQ writers, elevating the impact of their words to create community, preserve their legacies, and affirm the value of LGBTQ stories and lives.

== Function ==
Lambda Literary traces its beginnings back to 1987 when L. Page "Deacon" Maccubbin, owner of Lambda Rising Bookstore in Washington, DC, published the first Lambda Book Report, which brought critical attention to LGBTQ books.

The Lambda Literary Awards were born in 1989. At that first gala event, honors went to such distinguished writers as National Book Award finalist Paul Monette (author of Borrowed Time: An AIDS Memoir), Dorothy Allison (Trash), Alan Hollinghurst (The Swimming-Pool Library), and Edmund White (The Beautiful Room is Empty). The awards in the early years aimed to identify and celebrate the best lesbian and gay books in the year of their publication. The awards gave national visibility to literature that had established a firm if nascent beachhead through a network of dynamic lesbian and gay publishers and bookstores springing up across America. Since its inception, the Lambda Literary Awards ceremony has consistently drawn an audience representing every facet of publishing. The awards have ranged over many categories, reflecting the wide spectrum of LGBTQ books, and from the first year, they have stated that lesbian, gay, bisexual, and trans stories are part of the nation's literature. The Lammys' first virtual ceremony, in response to COVID-19, was held in 2021.

Lambda Book Report, meanwhile, grew into a comprehensive review periodical. Together with the Lambda Literary Awards, these programs cemented the reality that distinct, definable LGBT literature existed. Lambda Literary was created in 1997 as a 501(3)(c) corporation; its first Executive Director was Jim Marks.

In 2007, led by board president Katherine V. Forrest and executive director Charles Flowers, Lambda Literary founded its Writers Retreat for Emerging LGBTQ Voices, a residency designed to offer intensive instruction to selected writers over a one-week period. Faculty have included Dorothy Allison, John Rechy, Fenton Johnson, Katherine V. Forrest, Claire McNab, Bernard Cooper, Nicola Griffith, Ellen Bass, Rigoberto Gonzalez, D. A. Powell, Ellery Washington and Eloise Klein Healy. The retreat provides open access to industry professionals and the opportunity for fellows to create for themselves an ongoing community of practice as they advance in their craft and careers.

In early 2010, in an effort led by board member Nicola Griffith, Lambda Literary funded, staffed, and launched an online presence at LambdaLiterary.org, which celebrates, supports, serves, informs, entertains, and connects the whole of the diverse community that creates and supports lesbian, gay, bisexual and trans literature. The website replaced the Lambda Book Report.

In 2012, Lambda Literary launched the LGBTQ Writers in School program, where LGBTQ writers visited K-12 classrooms to discuss LGBTQ literature with young people.
