= Great Night =

Great Night may refer to:

- Great Night of Shiva, festival
- "Great Night", song by William Beckett
- "Great Night", song by Needtobreathe Hard Love
- The Great Night (novel), a 2011 novel by American author Chris Adrian
- The Great Night (film), a 1922 American comedy film
