= Nocturnes for the King of Naples =

1978 novel by Edmund White

- Author: Edmund White
- Publisher: St. Martin's Press
- Publication date: 1978
- Publication place: US
- ISBN: 0-312-57653-6

Nocturnes for the King of Naples is a 1978 novel by Edmund White. The novel is written as a series of letters addressed to a nameless former lover of the anonymous narrator.

The cover of the first paperback edition was illustrated by Mel Odom. It was Odom's first illustration for a book. The original drawing, titled 'Smoke', appeared at auction in June 2019 at Sotheby's for an estimate of $4,000 - $6,000.

White included an excerpt from W. B. Yeats's poem 'Meditations in Times of Civil War' before the first chapter.

== Summary ==
The plot takes the form of an anonymous narrator exchanging letters with a deceased lover, recounting their affair. The narrator remembers the pleasure they shared as well as the sorrows which can no longer be resolved due to his friend's death. Often the book touches on the theme of time and memories and how the narrator attempts to hold on or let go of these aspects of love and relationships.

== Literary significance ==
Stacy D'Erasmo described the setting of the novel as "1970s gay male nightlife at New York’s old rotting piers, a twisted, rusting, metallic ruin of anonymous sex and unexpectedly sublime tableaus."

Writing in The New York Times, John Yohalem described the novel as "a set of delicious, affected prose poems by a writer of great talent and high art."

White explores similar themes in A Boy's Own Story.
