= Our Young Man =

2016 novel by Edmund White

- Author: Edmund White
- Language: English
- Publisher: Bloomsbury
- Publication date: April 5, 2016
- Publication place: United States
- Pages: 304
- ISBN: 978-1-62040-996-1

Our Young Man is a 2016 novel by Edmund White. It is White's 11th novel and was first published by Bloomsbury on April 5, 2016. The plot follows the adventures of Guy, a young man who does not appear to age.

The book received generally positive reviews from critics. Michael Upchurch wrote in The New York Times that it contained "winningly hectic prose", though he felt that it was not as compelling as White's previous work, The Farewell Symphony. In a review for The Guardian, Neel Mukherjee praised White's descriptions and coverage of the emergence of HIV/AIDS in the United States. Eileen Battersby of The Irish Times wrote that "[r]eading this novel is similar to walking a tightrope" and favorably compared it to Oscar Wilde's The Picture of Dorian Gray.
