= Ifesinachi Comedy Nwanyanwu =

Nigerian environmental activist, artist, playwright and poet

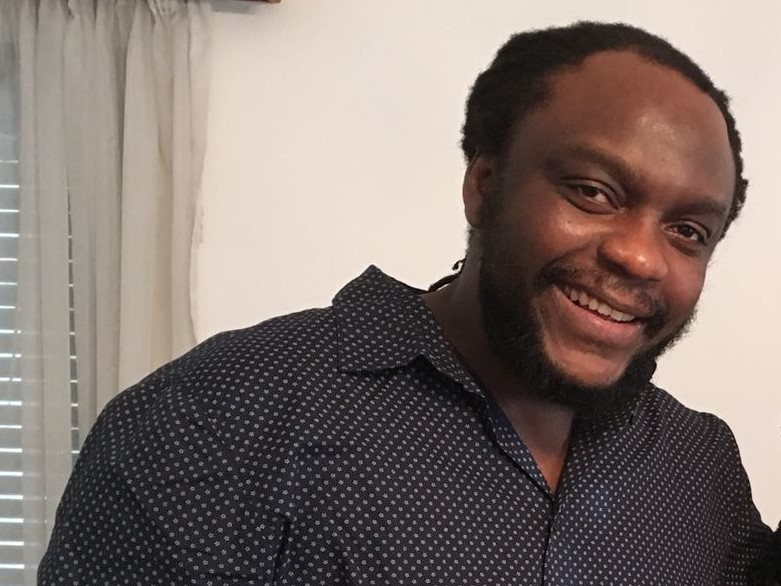
- Born: 2 June 1975 (age 51); Enugu State, Nigeria
- Known for: Visual artist, playwright, poet, environmental activist
- Awards: Nigeria Dream Personality Award

Ifesinachi Comedy Nwanyanwu (born 2 June 1975) is a Nigerian visual artist, playwright, poet and environmental activist. He was born in Nsukka, Nigeria.

He is the Curator of House 33 in Abuja and Founder and executive director of ENACOF. He is committed to the improvement of wastes into art works in a bid to promote a sustainable environment.

Ifesinachi is also a librarian at the British council which was sponsored by Maker Library Network.

Some of his project undergoing execution includes: 5,000 trees planting, cleanups and workshops for children, etc.

== Early life ==
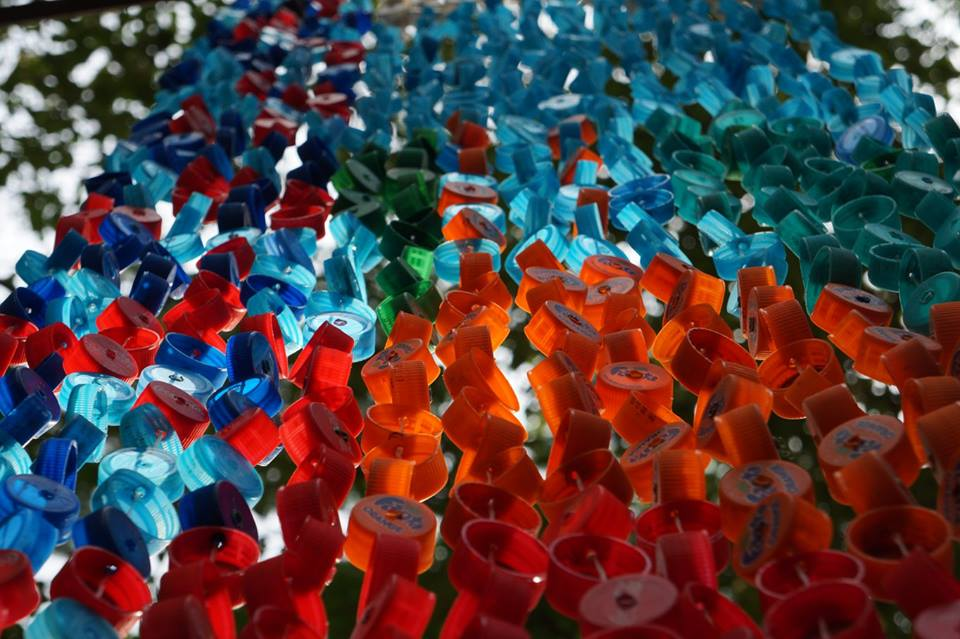
Behind the veil. Material - Plastic Bottle Cap. Year 2014

He was born on 2 June 1975 in Nsukka, Enugu State, Nigeria where he began his formative years. He has a B.Sc. in Crop Production which he obtained from the University of Nigeria, Nsukka. When he came to Abuja in 2000, he found out, how much need to be done on the field of art in the capital city of Nigeria.

== Career ==
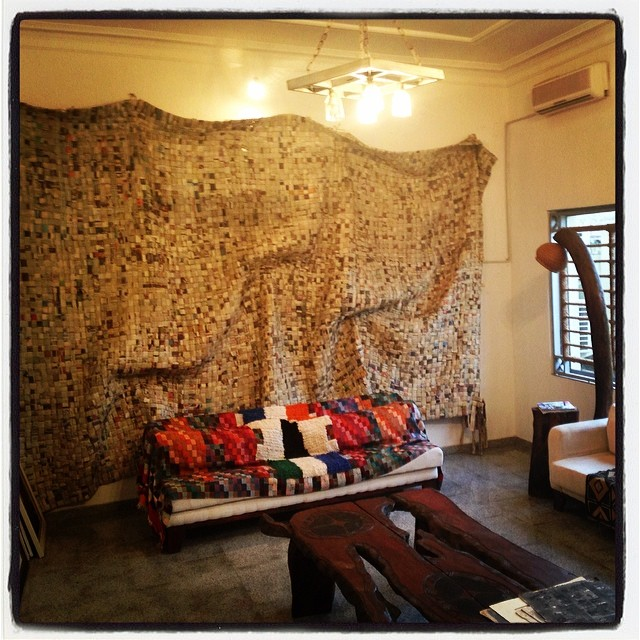
What Happens? Material - News Papers. Place: House 33. Year 2012.

He is the founder and executive director of Environmental Art Collective Foundation (ENACOF), and Curator of “One Environment” platform which successfully organised 2 editions of One Environment Hybrid 2016 and 2017. It involved round tables seminars and art workshops for professionals and kids which focused on environmental issues and many other activities like cleans-up, workshops for kids or planting trees projects. He is a co-founder and curator of private gallery House 33, along with Beasts Of No Nation author, Uzodinma Iweala.

== Awards and works ==
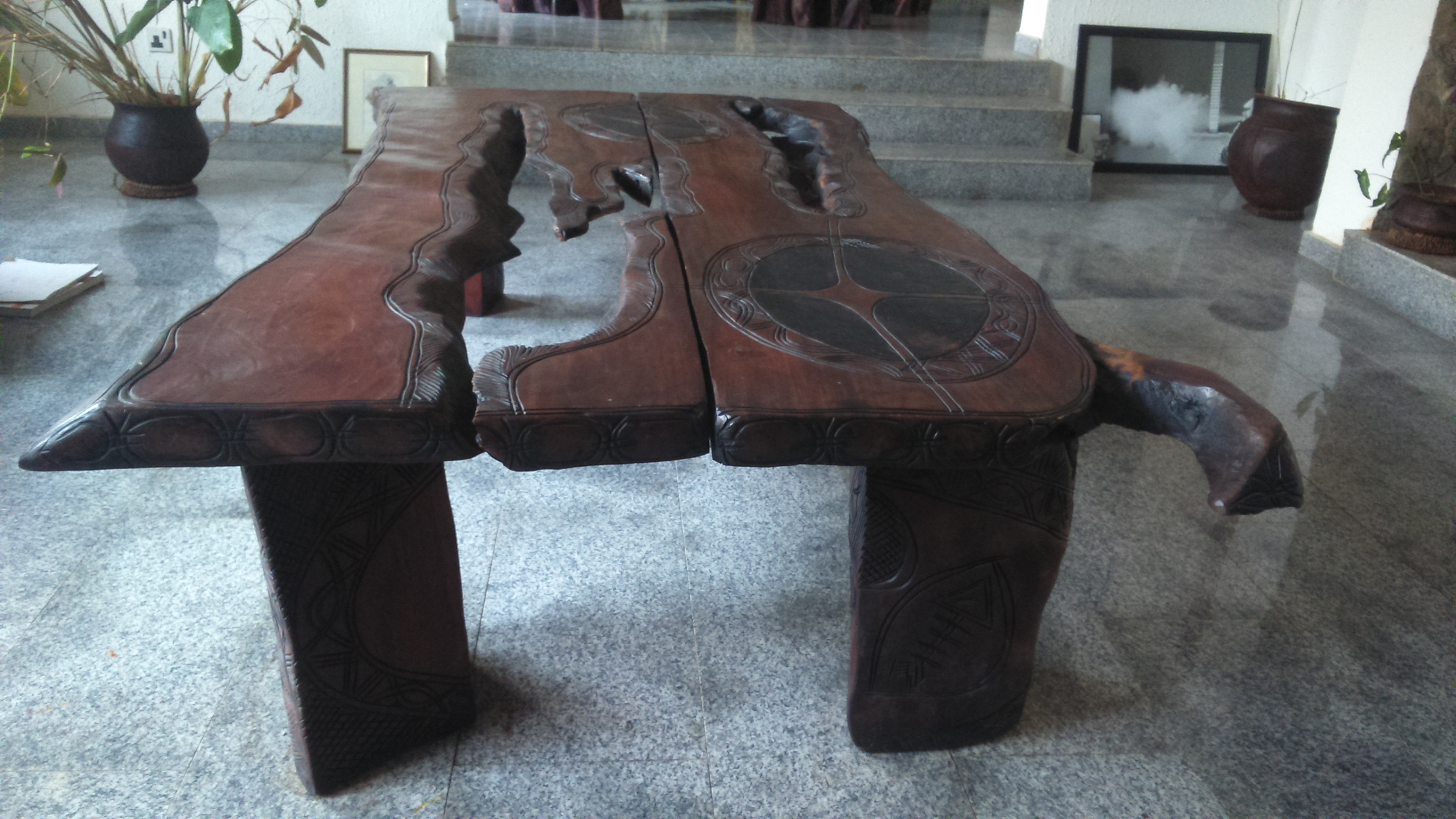
Mushroom Coffee Table. Material - Wood. Year 2012.

A recipient of the prestigious Nigeria Dream Personality Award, and presently the Curator of House 33. He is known to be a creative melting pot for artists and cultural practitioners in Abuja, Nigeria's Capital Territory. He is also the Maker Librarian at the British Council sponsored Maker Library Network.

== Projects ==
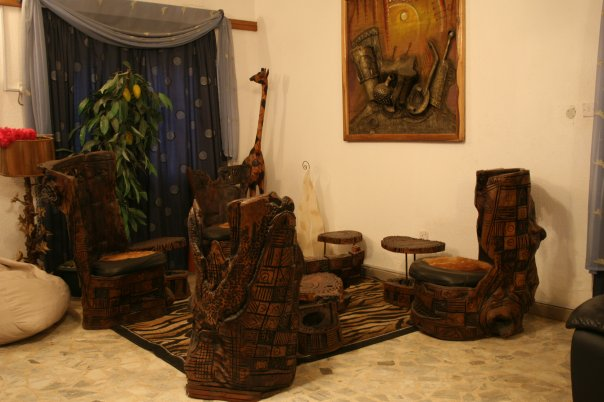
Vintage Living. Material - Wood. Year 2003. Place: House 33.

- Consumption By Moonlight
- One Environment Hybrid
- Environmental Garden
- Radioacustica: Czech radio
- Trashion: Clothes from Dangote Bags
- Women Empowerment: Women Creates from Waste
- 5,000 Trees Planting
- CleanUps
- Grasscutter Farm for IDP Camp in Edo State
- Cowdung Project
- Maker Library Abuja
- Workshops for Children
