= Love Falls On Us =

2019 non-fiction book

Love Falls On Us: A Story of American Ideas and African LGBT Lives
- First edition (US)
- Author: Robbie Corey-Boulet
- Language: English
- Subject: LGBTQ movement in Africa
- Genre: Non-fiction
- Publisher: Zed Books (US); Bloomsbury (UK)
- Publication date: 15 July 2019
- Publication place: United Kingdom
- Pages: 336
- ISBN: 9781786995186

Love Falls On Us: A Story of American Ideas and African LGBT Lives is a 2019 non-fiction book by journalist Robbie Corey-Boulet. The book focuses on the LGBTQ movement in Africa and the impact of American actions in Africa. Author Uzodinma Iweala and Choice Reviews praised the book.

== Synopsis ==
In December 2011 on Human Rights Day, Hillary Clinton said in a United Nations speech in Geneva that "gay rights are human rights, and human rights are gay rights." According to the book by journalist Robbie Corey-Boulet, the speech might have resulted in consequences within Africa for those identifying as LGBTQ. According to the author, the United States has made it difficult for LGBTQ activists and their largely unnoticed life. The book focuses on Cameroon, Ivory Coast, and Liberia to show glimpses of those countries both political and cultural in the context of LGBTQ living. Corey-Boulet argued that well-meaning Westerner activists have not allowed Africans themselves "to discuss the issue on their own terms, but instead to respond to what Westerners were doing and saying." It includes interviews and information from Africa and abroad to show how Africans who are LGBTQ live socially and politically. Subjects include a 2005 police raid in Yaoundé, a man's experience in Ivory Coast, LQBTQ organizations in Ivory Coast, the life of a Cameroon activist, and an H.I.V.-positive LQBTQ man.

== Reception ==
Choice Reviews said that Love Falls On Us is "a valuable addition to the literature on the global LGBT movement". Author Uzodinma Iweala wrote in The New York Times that the book "could be more inclusive" due to the author's tendency "to include more male-identifying voices than female-identifying and lesbian voice", but that "Corey-Boulet’s work more than rises to the challenge by elevating the extraordinary ordinariness of L.G.B.T.Q. Africans who are trying to live full, peaceful and free lives in the places they call home." The author, Neela Ghoshal of Human Rights Watch, and Yoseph Badwaza of Freedom House discussed the book on the Center for Strategic and International Studies podcast Into Africa with the host Judd Devermont.
