= Christopher Bram =

American author (born 1952)

- Born: February 22, 1952 (age 74); Buffalo, New York, U.S.
- Education: College of William & Mary (BA)
- Occupation: Author
- Writing career
- Genre: Fiction

Christopher Bram (born February 22, 1952) is an American author.

== Biography ==
Bram grew up in Virginia Beach, Virginia (outside Norfolk), where he was a paperboy and an Eagle Scout. He graduated from the College of William and Mary in 1974 (B.A. in English). He moved to New York City in 1978.

His nine novels range in subject matter from gay life in the 1970s to the career of a Victorian musical clairvoyant to the frantic world of theater people in contemporary New York. Fellow novelist Philip Gambone wrote of his work, "What is most impressive in Bram's fiction is the psychological and emotional accuracy with which he portrays his characters ... His novels are about ordinary gay people trying to be decent and good in a morally compromised world. He focuses on the often conflicting claims of friendship, family, love and desire; the ways good intentions can become confused and thwarted; and the ways we learn to be vulnerable and human." Bram has written numerous articles and essays (a selection is included in Mapping the Territory). He has also written or co-written several screenplays, including feature documentary and short narrative films directed by his partner, Draper Shreeve.

His 1995 novel Father of Frankenstein, about film director James Whale, was made into the 1998 movie Gods and Monsters starring Ian McKellen, Lynn Redgrave, and Brendan Fraser. The film was written and directed by Bill Condon who won an Academy Award for the adapted screenplay.

Bram was made a Guggenheim Fellow in 2001, and is a multiple nominee for the Lambda Literary Award for Gay Fiction, winning for Lives of the Circus Animals. In May 2003, he received the Bill Whitehead Award for Lifetime Achievement from Publishing Triangle, and in 2013 his book Eminent Outlaws: The Gay Writers Who Changed America won the organization's Randy Shilts Award. He lives in Greenwich Village and teaches at New York University.

== Bibliography ==
=== Novels ===
- Surprising Myself (1987)
- Hold Tight (1988)
- In Memory of Angel Clare (1989)
- Almost History (1992)
- Father of Frankenstein (1995)
- Gossip (1997)
- The Notorious Dr. August: His Real Life and Crimes (2000)
- Lives of the Circus Animals (2003)
- Exiles in America (2006)

=== Non-fiction ===
- Mapping the Territory (2009)
- Eminent Outlaws: The Gay Writers Who Changed America (2012)
- The Art of History: Unlocking the Past in Fiction and Nonfiction (2016)

=== Essays ===
- "Perry Street, West Greenwich Village" in Hometowns: Gay Men Write About Where They Belong edited by John Preston, 1990
- "Slow Learners" in Boys Like Us: Gay Writers Tell Their Coming Out Stories edited by Patrick Merla, 1996
- "A Queer Monster: Henry James and the Sex Question" in James White Review, 2003
- "Delicate Monsters" in I Do, I Don't: Queers on Marriage edited by Greg Wharton and Ian Phillips, 2004
- "Homage to Mr. Jimmy" in Gods and Monsters (new edition of Father of Frankenstein), 2005
- "The Zen of Tolstoy," Commonweal Magazine, March 2016
- "Mr. Smith Goes to Heaven: Remembering Bob Smith," Sessums Magazine, January 2018
- "Pauline at the Buggy Whip Factory: Our Day with Pauline Kael," Sessums Magazine, February 2019
- "A Fan's Notes," introduction to Isherwood in Transit, University of Minnesota Press, 2020
