= Chihominey's Secret =

Novel by Nancy Kim

- Author: Nancy Kim
- Language: English
- Publication date: 1999

Chihominey's Secret is a 1999 novel by Nancy Kim about a Korean American family.

== Plot ==
Chihominey's Secret tells the story of the Choi family, a Korean American family in West Los Angeles living with a haunting prophecy from over 20 years before. Through the family, the novel examines the generational conflict between immigrant parents and their assimilated, Americanized daughters as their Korean grandmother comes to visit. The book's title is an intentional misspelling of the Korean word for "paternal grandmother", chinhalmeoni (친할머니).

== Reception ==
Linda Richards, writing for January Magazine, praised it as "an engaging story, well told".

However, Philip Gambone of The New York Times was more critical, stating that "we're given melodramatic plot twists and scenes that serve no purpose ... and the dialogue often reads like a soap opera".

Chinhominey's Secret was a Booklist Editor's Choice for Best Adult Books for Young Adults for 1999.
