= Michael Carroll (American writer) =

American writer of literary fiction

- Born: 1964 (age 61–62); Memphis, Tennessee, U.S.
- Occupation: Author
- Spouse: Edmund White (m. 2013; died 2025)
- Writing career
- Period: 2010s–present
- Notable work: Little Reef

Michael Carroll (born 1964) is an American writer. He published his debut short story collection, Little Reef, in 2014. The collection, which portrays characters that, according to the UW Press, are "people stunned by the shock of the now, who have forgotten their pasts and can’t envision a future". The book was a shortlisted nominee for the Lambda Literary Award for Gay Fiction at the 27th Lambda Literary Awards and won the Sue Kaufman Prize for First Fiction from the American Academy of Arts and Letters.

His second book, Stella Maris: And Other Key West Stories, was published by Turtle Point Press in 2019.

His short stories have appeared in magazines Ontario Review, Boulevard, Southwest Review, The Yale Review, Open City, Animal Shelter, and anthologies such as Men on Men 7, Boys Like Us, and The New Penguin Book of Gay Short Stories.

Born in Memphis and raised in Jacksonville, Florida, he became the partner of Edmund White in 1995. Carroll and White were married in 2013, and White died in 2025.

== Works ==
- Little Reef (2014)
- Stella Maris: And Other Key West Stories (2019)
