= Christopher Davis (writer) =

American writer

Christopher Davis (born 1953) is an American writer. He is best known for his HIV/AIDS-themed novels Valley of the Shadow (1988), which was a shortlisted nominee for the Lambda Literary Award for Gay Fiction at the 1st Lambda Literary Awards in 1989, and Philadelphia (1994), a novelization of the 1993 drama film Philadelphia.

Davis also published the novel Joseph and the Old Man (1986), and the short story collection The Boys in the Bars (1989).

Davis released little biographical information about himself to the media, and did not publish any further work after Philadelphia.
