= The Children's Hospital (novel) =

Novel by Chris Adrian

- Hardcover edition
- Author: Chris Adrian
- Language: English
- Subject: Morality/Society
- Genre: Apocalyptic and post-apocalyptic fiction
- Publisher: McSweeney's
- Publication date: August 22, 2006
- Publication place: United States
- Media type: Print (hardcover)
- Pages: 615
- ISBN: 978-1932416602
- Followed by: The Great Night

The Children's Hospital is the second novel by Chris Adrian, published on August 22, 2006 by McSweeney's. One critic called it a "dark, hilarious .. epic novel" that "can be gruesome."

== Introduction ==
The Children's Hospital is a long work, with the first edition copies running some 615 pages. The novel starts in the maternity ward of a famous hospital. As a storm rages outside, third-year medical student Jemma Claflin helps deliver another complicated birth. The storm soon floods the rest of the earth beneath seven miles of water. The hospital begins to float and the survivors try to retain a semblance of normal life, combating the illness of their patients and setting up an internal government.

== Plot summary ==
Jemma Claflin is a struggling third-year medical student at a children's hospital. She is teased by the nurses and tormented by her superiors, but she is most crippled by a lack of passion for her profession. A traumatic past also haunts her daily life. Her family and loved ones died in various incidents, leaving Jemma with the belief that she must avoid loving anyone else, lest they also be killed. Jemma is particularly troubled by the loss of her brother, Calvin, who filled her early years with the supernatural and eventually took his own life. Despite her guarded emotions, Jemma enters a relationship with fellow medical student Rob Dickens.

On a particularly stormy night Jemma aides in the birth of a disfigured child, a daughter of a “King of the East” who had come to New Jersey and married. The child is named Brenda and often points at Jemma, to her discomfort. After the birth, Jemma seeks solace in a sexual liaison with Rob in the on-call room. When they emerge, the storm has submerged the entire world beneath a vast ocean, with only the hospital and its inhabitants left floating above. No one finds time to mourn the loss of the world as the condition of the hospital's patients suddenly turns for the worse, and every adult is busy attending to them. The hospital has reconfigured its layout, and an angel begins to speak to them, asking each person to name her so that she can serve them. A man named John Grampus reveals that he is the architect of the hospital, and was contacted by the angel long ago to create the building which would serve as an ark when the Apocalypse came.

Once the patients are stable, life in the hospital returns to a relative state of normalcy. The hospital hierarchy remains intact as medical personnel and parents focus on their sole mission- to make the children well. Everything that could be needed is provided by the angel via replicators, and people may even request items which have never existed before. The daily lives of other medical students are flavored by their own personal problems. Dr. Chandra struggles with his lack of medical aptitude and deepening loneliness. Jemma's best friend, Vivian dates constantly, while secretly obsessing with a long list of reasons leading to the end of the world. Jemma continues to go through the motions during rounds, not really helping any patient but getting to know them and the particulars of their ailments. Jemma develops notable relationships with several children including Pickie Beecher, a mentally disturbed boy who drinks blood, and Jarvis, a boy who was warned of the Apocalypse by John Grampus and stowed away in the hospital on the night of the storm.

One day a surgical lamp hits Rob in the head and causes brain damage. The power of her grief allows Jemma to tap into previously undiscovered healing powers which manifest as green fire. She heals Rob and then proceeds to heal each person in the hospital of whatever medical issues they may have. Following the healing of all the patients, the hospital needs a new sense of purpose. A council is elected (of which Jemma is named the highest title of Universal Friend) and the adults are put in charge of leading classes for the children. The children whose parents died in the flood are adopted to various adults in the hospital, and Jemma and Rob adopt Pickie Beecher.

Things begin to appear in the previously empty ocean. A man is retrieved from the water. He cannot remember anything about himself, and is named Ishmael by the inhabitants of the hospital. Fish and other marine organisms begin to appear, and can be watched from the windows of the hospital. Jemma discovers that she is pregnant and the hospital joyously throws a wedding for her and Rob. One day a ship is spotted in the distance. It is a cruise liner, and Jemma and a few delegates board the ship to explore it. They return with one person, a teenage boy who carries with him a diary detailing his sexual exploits with male and female passengers of the cruise ship, now long gone. He is in a permanent sleep, and can cannot be roused.

After the boy is brought into the hospital, people begin to develop a sickness termed “the Botch.” It manifests differently in each patient. Though Jemma can sense the Botch inside each person, she is unable to use her powers to heal it. Her attempts appear as if she is using her green fire to kill afflicted persons, and she is impeached of her position as Universal Friend. Adult begin to die, turning into greasy ash, while those under the age of 21 slowly fall into deep sleeps. Soon the only people left in the hospital are the sleeping children, heavily pregnant Jemma, Rob, and Ishmael who is delving into insanity. Rob has the Botch, but Jemma's love for him keeps it at bay. Despite this, Rob slowly degrades both physically and mentally. While Ishmael roams the hospital in madness, Rob helps Jemma tend to the sleeping children until he, too, dies.

Jemma begins labor, and climbs to the roof to give birth where she encounters Ishmael. A land mass is visible from the roof and the hospital draws nearer. As the child is born, the children of the hospital wake up. The hospital reaches the land mass and Jemma dies, seeing the children exit the hospital to join the new world. Jemma's adopted son, Pickie Beecher, carries the princess Brenda and Jemma's newborn son with him as he crosses.
