= Steven Corbin =

American writer

- Born: October 3, 1953; Jersey City, New Jersey
- Died: August 31, 1995 (aged 41); New York, New York

Steven Corbin (October 3, 1953 – August 31, 1995) was an American writer. He was known for his novel Fragments That Remain, a Lambda Literary Award nominee for Gay Fiction at the 1994 6th Lambda Literary Awards.

Born in Jersey City, he studied at Essex County College for two years before switching to the University of Southern California to study film. He dropped out of the program, and began to write while working as a secretary and taxi driver. He published his debut novel, No Easy Place to Be, in 1989. He published Fragments That Remain in 1993, A Hundred Days from Now in 1994, and several short stories.

He died on August 31, 1995, of AIDS complications, in New York City. He taught creative writing at the University of California.
