= Camarin Grae =

American psychologist

- Born: Marian Grace; 1941 (age 84–85); Chicago, Illinois
- Occupation: Science fiction novelist
- Writing career
- Period: 1980s–1990s
- Notable works: The Secret in the Bird, Slick, Stranded

Camarin Grae is the pen name of Marian Grace (born 1941), an American writer of lesbian-themed science fiction. She has been a three-time Lambda Literary Award nominee: The Secret in the Bird was a Lambda Literary Award for Lesbian Fiction nominee at the 1st Lambda Literary Awards in 1989, Slick was a nominee for Lesbian Mystery at the 3rd Lambda Literary Awards in 1991, and Stranded was nominated for Lesbian Science Fiction, Fantasy or Horror at the 4th Lambda Literary Awards in 1992.

Originally from Chicago, Illinois, Grace was educated in clinical psychology. She used the pen name, an anagram of her real name, to keep her writing separate from her professional career as a psychologist.

== Works ==
- The Winged Dancer (1983, ISBN 978-0930044886)
- Soul Snatcher (1985, ISBN 978-0913017036)
- Paz (1986, ISBN 978-0930044893)
- The Secret in the Bird (1988, ISBN 978-0941483056)
- Edgewise (1989, ISBN 978-0941483193)
- Slick (1990, ISBN 978-0941483742)
- Stranded (1991, ISBN 978-0941483995)
- Wednesday Nights (1994, ISBN 978-1562800604)
