= Boston University Academy =

Coordinates: 42.3510°N 71.1098°W

- Boston, Massachusetts; United States

Information
- Type: Independent secondary school
- Motto: Learning Without Limits
- Established: 1993
- Head of School: Christos Kolovos
- Staff: 46
- Teaching staff: 24
- Enrollment: 245
- Colors: Scarlet, white and black
- Athletics: New England Preparatory School Athletic Council – Massachusetts Bay Independent League, Girls’ Independent League
- Mascot: Rhett the Boston Terrier
- Nickname: Terriers
- Affiliations: Boston University, The New England Association of Schools and Colleges
- Website: buacademy.org

Boston University Academy (BUA) is a private high school operated by Boston University. Founded in 1993 and located on the Boston University campus, the academy is geared toward college preparatory work. As part of its integration with the university, students are able to take college courses for credit their junior and senior years. Students are guaranteed acceptance to Boston University if they maintain a 3.0 grade point average in Boston University courses and have no history of major disciplinary actions.

BUA's student body is drawn from nearly 50 communities in the greater Boston area: 35% come from public schools, 61% from independent schools, 4% from parochial schools, and <1% are from home-school or international schools; 59% are students of color and 37% of students come from multilingual households (representing 26 languages). BUA provides need-based tuition assistance to 27% of students as of the 2026-2027 academic year.

== Accreditation ==
The academy is accredited by the New England Association of Schools and Colleges and is a member of the Association of Independent Schools of New England.

== History ==
Boston University Academy was proposed and founded in 1993 by Peter Schweich, then the vice president for publications of Boston University, and authorized by John Silber, then the president of Boston University. Peter Schweich was its first headmaster and served in that role until 1999, when he was succeeded by interim head of school Jennifer Bond Hickman. James Tracy replaced Hickman and served until spring 2006, when he was replaced by James Berkman. On August 21, 2014, Berkman announced that he would retire after the 2014–2015 academic year. On November 14, 2014, Provost Jean Morrison announced the appointment of Ari Betof to replace Berkman effective July 1, 2015. Following Betof's departure in 2018, Rosemary White was appointed interim head of school. Dr. White served as interim head of school until Christos J. Kolovos began his tenure in summer 2020.

When Boston University Academy was founded, it covered grades 9–12; an 8th grade of approximately 20 students was added in 1999. The 8th grade was dropped in 2005.

== Notable faculty ==
- Philip Gambone, a published author, primarily taught freshman English during his 13-year tenure from 2004 until his retirement in 2017. Gambone returned for the 2018–2019 academic year after which time he again retired.
- Brett Abigaña, a noted composer and co-founder and associate director of the Boston Composers' Coalition.
