= Harlan Greene =

American writer and historian

- Born: June 19, 1953 (age 73); Charleston, South Carolina, U.S.
- Occupations: Novelist; historian; archivist
- Writing career
- Period: 1980s–present
- Notable works: What the Dead Remember, The German Officer's Boy

Harlan Greene (born June 19, 1953) is an American writer and historian. He has published both fiction and non-fiction works. He won the Lambda Literary Award for Gay Fiction for his 1991 novel What the Dead Remember.

== Early life ==
Born in 1953 in Charleston, South Carolina, Greene's parents were Holocaust survivors who moved to Charleston after World War II.

== Career ==
Greene is an author and historian. He has published both fiction and non-fiction works. He won the Lambda Literary Award for Gay Fiction for his 1991 novel What the Dead Remember, and was nominated for the same award for his 2005 novel The German Officer's Boy.

In addition to his writing, Greene has worked as an archivist for the College of Charleston, including collecting materials relating to Jewish history in the Charleston region.

== Personal life ==
Openly gay, Greene spent several years living in Chapel Hill, North Carolina, in early adulthood, with his then-partner Olin Jolley. Greene and Jolley are featured in the anthology Two Hearts Desire: Gay Couples on their Love, originally published in 1997, and republished in digital format in 2017. Greene now lives in Charleston with his partner Jonathan Ray.

== Works ==
=== Fiction ===
- Why We Never Danced the Charleston (1985, 978–0140082180)
- What the Dead Remember (1991, ISBN 978-0452268654)
- The German Officer's Boy (2005, ISBN 978-0299208103)

=== Non-fiction ===
- Charleston: City of Memory (1987, ISBN 978-0933101111)
- Mr. Skylark: John Bennett and the Charleston Renaissance (2001, ISBN 978-0820322117)
- Renaissance in Charleston: Art and Life in the Carolina Low Country, 1900-1940 (2003, ISBN 978-0820325187)
- Slave Badges and the Slave-Hire System in Charleston, South Carolina, 1783-1865 (2004, ISBN 978-0786417292)
- Cornices of Charleston (2005, ISBN 978-0976717119)
- The Damned Don't Cry -- They Just Disappear: The Life and Works of Harry Hervey (2018, ISBN 9781611178128)
