= States of Desire =

1979 book by Edmund White

- Author: Edmund White
- Language: English
- Publisher: E. P. Dutton
- Publication date: February 1979
- Publication place: United States

States of Desire: Travels in Gay America is a book by American writer Edmund White. Published in early 1979, the book follows the lives of gay men and their communities across several U.S. states.

The book provides several accounts from gay men in multiple American cities and states, such as New Mexico, Cincinnati and Salt Lake. A common theme discusses by them, as well as White himself, was the fear of aging out of the gay sexual market. At the end of the book, he interviews a pedophile who fears he will be imprisoned for his sexual interests, to whom White responds that "while you were talking I kept wishing I'd met you when I was nine and you the age you are now".
