= John Stewart Wynne =

American writer

John Stewart Wynne (a.k.a. John Wynne) is an American author of novels, short stories, and poetry, as well as a Grammy-nominated producer of spoken word recordings.

His writing often depicts characters in extremis, outsiders adrift in a conformist landscape, in plots that juxtapose the surreal and naturalistic.

== Career ==
=== Novels ===
Wynne's first novel Crime Wave (John Calder/Riverrun Press, 1982) details the unexpected love affair between a photojournalist (Jake Adams) and a woman (Renee Cloverman) living in a Manhattan brothel. Jake attempts to make Renee respectable by moving her into the country with his aunt's family where her presence turns out to be a risk not only for her but for them as well. It was praised by author Barbara Trapido in The Spectator as a "disturbing, well-written and impressive work whose genre is Manhattan lumpen Gothic...the book has a terrible and compelling beauty." Author Jenny Uglow in The Times Literary Supplement wrote "Crime Wave is about personal and social sado-masochism. The author's challenging aim is to show there is no such thing as 'mindless violence', whether directed towards the self or towards others. Each aggressive act is the result of a long cycle of action and reaction, continued through generations. Crime Wave is an ambitious first novel."

Magnus Books published Wynne's second novel The Red Shoes in July 2013. "The Red Shoes, set in contemporary New York City, is a beautifully dark queer re-visioning of the Hans Christian Andersen fairy tale of the same title. Wynne immediately engages the reader with finely detailed descriptions, nuanced character development, and an air of mystery that makes the 428-page text read like a novella,” wrote Jamie Jones in Lambda Literary.

Kate Christensen, winner of the PEN/Faulkner Best American Work of Fiction Award for The Great Man, said: "I read this so fast I got blisters turning pages. The Red Shoes is so astonishingly good, original, beautiful and amazing...I love the Gothic feeling of impending doom and the counterbalancing elements of light. Wynne's writing is free of compromise, fear. He has the rare ability to write on a plane floating just above life, or below it. And his voice doesn't sound like anyone else's. I think The Red Shoes is a great work of art." Author and book editor Ben Schrank wrote, "The narrator is as fully realized and endearing a character as I've ever known." Stephen D. Adams, author of The Homosexual as Hero said, "I loved the mysteriousness of everything and everybody in The Red Shoes and the way its preoccupations with loss, danger and safety would loom in and out of view in the surreal fog of drugs, sex and dark humor. I found it quite haunting and didn't want it to end."

In 2014, The Red Shoes was nominated for the Lambda Literary Award in the Gay Fiction category.

In 2026, Tree Line Books published a new edition of The Red Shoes.

=== Short fiction ===
Wynne's first published fiction was the 1978 short story The Sighting (Tree Line Books), where flying saucers and Bela Lugosi rub up against an archetypal 1950s drive-in while counterpointing the blossoming relationship of two teen-age boys. Gordon Montador in The Body Politic enthused: "There is nothing else quite like it, for no other writer has experimented with gay experience in the context of our adolescence in straight America in such a direct, sensual and imaginative manner." The Sighting was further praised by Hubert Selby Jr., 1980 Prix Goncourt winner Yves Navarre, Rita Mae Brown, James Purdy, and Charles Palliser. The story was selected by Ian Young as one of the seminal works of gay literature in his The Male Homosexual in Literature: A Bibliography.

Wynne's short story collection The Other World (City Lights, 1994), peopled with circus performers, sociopaths, cross-dressing teenagers and God-fearing families, was described as "one of the best books of the decade" by The James White Review. Details magazine wrote, "Wynne's prose is chiseled and precise. And in pages that tremble with beauty, Wynne gracefully reveals the darker side of human possibilities." Booklist called it "startling, outrageous, frightening and sometimes even funny." National Book Award-winner Paul Monette wrote, "With so much tepid and sentimental fiction coming out, Wynne's stories are like a plunge in cold water. With a near-Brechtian intensity of focus and an infallible ear for dialogue, Wynne casts a laser eye on the things we say, so different from what we mean. A book to handle with asbestos gloves, but well worth the walk through fire." Lambda Award-winner Rebecca Brown called it "an incredibly powerful book."

Wynne's other short fiction and poetry have appeared in The Paris Review, The American Poetry Review, Christopher Street, and High Risk 2, among other publications.

In 2023, Tree Line Books, the original publisher of The Sighting as a chapbook in 1978, announced in a Twitter post that the imprint had been resurrected specifically to present the work of John Stewart Wynne to a new audience. Under its reborn Tree Line Story Book Series, the publisher brought out several new stories by Wynne in individual ebook only format: Louise, Dont Go, Narcissist, Blonds, A Night in the Pampas, The Needles Highway, and Afternoon. There is also an ebook only edition of The Sighting.

In 2025, Tree Line Books issued new print and ebook editions of The Other World, and in 2026, they debuted a new collection of Wynne's stories titled Consequences of Attraction. It was honored as a 2026 Eric Hoffer Book Award Category Finalist.

=== Spoken word ===
Wynne has also produced and directed over one hundred audio books, including The Phantom of the Opera performed by F. Murray Abraham, William Styron reading his Darkness Visible (memoir), Christopher Reeve performing F. Scott Fitzgerald's The Great Gatsby, and John F. Kennedy Jr. reading his father's Pulitzer Prize-winning book Profiles in Courage. The latter was nominated for the 1991 Grammy Award as Best Spoken Word Album. Wynne himself was nominated for the Grammy Award in 1995 as producer of Best Spoken Word Album for Children for The Magic School Bus: Fun with Sound, featuring Lily Tomlin.

In 1995, Wynne authored the first popular guide to spoken word recordings, The Listener's Guide to Audio Books (Fireside Books/Simon & Schuster).

== Bibliography ==
- Opera in Santa Fe (poem), Concept: An Anthology of Contemporary American Writing, New London Press, 1978
- The Sighting (short story), Tree Line Books, 1978. ISBN 0-931476-00-3
- Two Struggling Actresses (poem), The Paris Review, Issue 76, Fall 1979
- Shoal (poem), The Nantucket Review, Issue 14, 1979
- Moonlight (poem), The American Poetry Review, Vol. 8/No. 6, November/December 1979
- The Sighting (short story) and Nameless Thing (short story), New Writing and Writers 17, John Calder, 1980
- Crime Wave: A Novel (novel), John Calder/Riverrun Press, 1982
- Afternoon (short story), Christopher Street, Issue 87, 1984
- Haiku (poem), Bastard Review, Issue 5/6, 1992
- The Other World: Stories (short story collection), City Lights, 1994. Contents: The Other World, Nameless Thing, Raphael, Lights of Broadway, Halloween Card, and Vulture
- The Other World (short story), High Risk 2, Plume/Penguin Books, 1994
- The Listener's Guide to Audio Books: Reviews, Recommendations, and Listings for More Than 2,000 Titles (non-fiction book), Fireside Books/Simon & Schuster, 1995
- The Needles Highway (short story), Untreed Reads, 2012
- A Night in the Pampas (short story), Year's End, Untreed Reads, 2012
- The Other World: Stories (revised short story collection), Untreed Reads, 2013. Contents: The Other World, Nameless Thing, Raphael, Lights of Broadway, Halloween Card and Vulture
- The Red Shoes (novel), Magnus Books, 2013
- Louise, Don't Go (short story, ebook), Tree Line Books, 2023. ISBN 978-0931476013
- Narcissist (short story, ebook), Tree Line Books, 2023. ISBN 978-0931476020
- Blonds (short story, ebook), Tree Line Books, 2023. ISBN 978-0931476037
- The Sighting (short story, ebook), Tree Line Books, 2023. ISBN 978-0931476044
- A Night in the Pampas (short story, ebook), Tree Line Books, 2024. ISBN 978-0931476051
- The Needles Highway (short story, ebook), Tree Line Books, 2024. ISBN 978-0931476068
- Afternoon (revised short story, ebook), Tree Line Books, 2025. ISBN 978-0931476129
- The Other World: Stories (revised short story collection), Tree Line Books, 2025. Contents: The Other World, Nameless Thing, Raphael, Lights of Broadway, Halloween Card, and Vulture
- Consequences of Attraction (short story collection), Tree Line Books, 2026. Contents: A Killing in East Hampton, Narcissist, We're Going Places, Louise, Don't Go, and Blonds

== Audiography ==
Produced and directed over 100 audio books including:

Fitzgerald, F. Scott. The Great Gatsby, Durkin Hayes, 1992. Performed by Christopher Reeve.

Kennedy, John F. Profiles in Courage, Caedmon, 1990. Read by John F. Kennedy Jr.

Leroux, Gaston. The Phantom of the Opera, Caedmon, 1988. Performed by F. Murray Abraham.

The Magic School Bus: Fun With Sound, TW Kids, 1994.

Styron, William. Darkness Visible: A Memoir of Madness, Random House Audio, 1990. Read by William Styron.

Waters, John. Shock Value, Caedmon, 1989. Performed by John Waters.
