= Ines Rieder =

Austrian author, political scientist and journalist (1954-2015)

Ines Rieder (3 May 1954 – 24 December 2015) was an Austrian author, political scientist and journalist.

== Life ==
Rieder was born in Vienna, Austria, the daughter of Hilda and Walter Rieder. She studied political science and ethnology at the University of Vienna. Her later career would see her travel to California, Brazil and throughout Europe.

From 1976 to 1984 she worked as a journalist and translator in Berkeley, California. She also found work in San Francisco with a media and translation collective. There she helped to produce Newsfront International, and Connexions, an international feminist quarterly. From 1984 to 1986 she was journalist and interpreter in São Paulo, Brazil.

Rieder was editor-at-large for Cleis Press in San Francisco from 1987 to 1994. One of the notable books that she edited in her time there was Aids: The Women (1988), the first book to document the work of women in the early years of the Aids crisis and the solidarity between the lesbian and gay communities in this period. The book was published in the US, Europe and China. In 1994 she published "Wer mit wem?" Berühmte Frauen, ihre Freundinnen, Liebhaberinnen und Lebensgefährtinnen (in translation: Who with whom? Famous women, their friends, lovers and partners), the first of her several studies of the lives of lesbians.

In 2000, Rieder and Diana Voigt completed the biography of Margarethe Trautenegg-Csonka (1900-1999), Sigmund Freud's lesbian patient, who they codenamed as "Sidonie C.", after interviewing her at length towards the end of her life. It was published in four languages and reissued in 2012. Rieder contributed to many anthologies and researched the lives of lesbians in Vienna during and after the second world war. In 2001 she was co-editor of a catalogue for an exhibition project called The Different View, about lesbian and gay life in Austria, and in 2005 was co-curator of (in translation) Secret Life: About gay men and lesbians in 20th-century Vienna.

Rieder joined the women's movement in Brazil, worked on rainwater-harvesting projects and was a proactive supporter of Women on Waves, an international organisation using a Dutch ship to provide abortion and contraception services in countries where these are difficult to obtain or illegal. Most recently she was supporting work with refugees from Syria in Vienna, especially those from the LGBT communities.

== Publications ==
- "Wer mit wem?" Hundert Jahre lesbische Liebe. Berühmte Frauen, ihre Freundinnen, Liebhaberinnen und Lebensgefährtinnen. Wiener Frauenverlag, Wien 1994 Vienna, 1994 ISBN 3-423-36054-2.
- with Diana Voigt: Heimliches Begehren: Die Geschichte der Sidonie C. 2000. (Biography of Sigmund Freud's lesbian Patient Margarethe Trautenegg-Csonka, republished in 2012 under the title Die Geschichte der Sidonie C., Sigmund Freud's berühmte Patientin)
- with Wolfgang Förster and Tobis G. Natter: The Other Look, Queer Lives in Austria. 2001.
- with Andreas Brunner, Nadja Schefzig, Hannes Sulzenbacher und Niko Wahl: Geheimsache: Leben. Schwule und Lesben im Wien des 20. Jahrhunderts. Ausstellungskatalog. 2005.
- Mopsa Sternheim – Ein Leben am Abgrund. Zaglossus, Austria 2015, ISBN 978-3-902902-25-2.
