= Raymond Luczak =

American writer

- Born: Ironwood, Michigan

Raymond Luczak, an American writer, was born in Ironwood, Michigan, located in the Upper Peninsula.

== Career and legacy ==
Luczak was featured on The Deaf Poet Society, a website designed to honor deaf poets. Raymond Luczak has been advocating for the expansion of accessibility to the disability community by transcription and ASL translations. Raymond Luczak also commends other disabled artists over his own work, as the recognition of any creator with a disability who understands how it feels to exist is preferred over poets who use the disability of others as a writing piece, a practice he is working against. Raymond Luczak is currently an editor and transcriber to help spread the use and accessibility of poetry and literary arts to others.
