= Bonnie Shimko =

American author of young adult novels

Bonnie Shimko is an American author of five young adult novels.

== Biography ==
After thirty-three years of teaching second grade, Bonnie Shimko retired and began writing. Her first novel, Letters in the Attic, won a Lambda Literary Award for children's/young adult fiction in 2002. Shimko lives in Plattsburgh, New York.

== Works ==
- Letters in the Attic (2002)
- Kat's Promise (2006)
- The Private Thoughts of Amelia E. Rye (2010)
- You Know What You Have to Do (2013)
- Stony Lonesome Road (2015)
