= A Boy's Own Story =

1982 novel by Edmund White

- Author: Edmund White
- Language: English
- Genre: Autobiographical novel
- Publisher: E. P. Dutton
- Publication date: September 28, 1982
- Publication place: United States
- Media type: Print (hardcover and paperback)
- Pages: 217
- ISBN: 0-525-24128-0
- OCLC: 8493518
- Dewey Decimal: 813/.54 19
- LC Class: PS3573.H463 B6 1982
- Followed by: The Beautiful Room Is Empty

A Boy's Own Story is a 1982 semi-autobiographical novel by American novelist Edmund White.

== Overview ==
A Boy's Own Story is the first of a trilogy of novels, describing a boy's coming of age and documenting a young man's experience of homosexuality in the 1950s in Cincinnati, Chicago and Michigan. The trilogy continued with The Beautiful Room Is Empty (1988) and The Farewell Symphony (1997), which brought the setting up to the 1990s. Although all three share a number of themes and are frequently considered at least partly autobiographical, they do not tell a linear story in the manner of some trilogies.

== Plot ==
The story starts when the narrator, aged 15, experiences the physical side of young love with his 12-year-old friend Kevin O'Brien. Although he is the younger boy, Kevin takes the lead in the sexual activity. The encounters between the two adolescents become infrequent and are pushed to the background as the narrator's soul-searching about his homosexuality continues. The narrator remembers his childhood and his parents' divorce, as well as his older sister's constant teasing. Since a young age, he knew he was attracted to men, but he tried to outgrow it or rationalize it as some kind of passing phase.

During a visit to his father over the summer, the protagonist befriends a man from the town who promises to take him to New York for some money. The man never appears on the day that they were going to leave, so the protagonist understands that he was tricked. The next time he meets him, however, the man takes him to a hustler, with whom the protagonist has his first sexual experience. During a camping trip to which he arrives earlier than the rest of the boys, he gives oral sex to a troubled boy that everyone else avoided.

After experiencing an unrequited crush on his best friend, the protagonist asks his father to send him to an all-male boarding school, convinced that the constant interactions with men would help him leave his homosexuality behind. He also starts seeing a therapist, who tries to convince him that his homosexuality is caused by his attachment to his mother. The protagonist befriends one of his teachers and his wife, with whom he discusses literature and philosophy. He learns that his teacher was also gay, but he declares that his wife and God helped him leave that phase behind. Eventually, a jazz teacher arrives and the protagonist learns that he was selling marijuana, so he decides to tell on him. Before doing that, however, he seduces the jazz teacher and gives him oral sex. The teacher gets fired, and the protagonist tries to rationalize his actions by telling himself that he just wanted to use his teacher but did not want to commit to his homosexuality.

== Critical reception ==
Catherine Stimpson, a reviewer, suggests that A Boy's Own Story combines elements of J. D. Salinger's The Catcher in the Rye and Oscar Wilde's De Profundis. In The Boston Phoenix, Mark Moses wrote: "What charges this book is a confluence: the amazed stare of the gay kid, who's realizing how his gayness has made his world scarily brand new, with the amazed stare behind White's own tooled prose. The two are so mingled that the style nearly defines the story."

Paul Flynn and Matthew Todd called the novel "a touchstone in gay culture just as Christopher Isherwood's Goodbye to Berlin was in the 30s, Larry Kramer's Faggots in the 70s".
