= Speak No Evil (Iweala novel) =

2018 novel by Uzodinma Iweala

Speak No evil
- First edition
- Author: Uzodinma Iweala
- Language: English
- Publisher: John Murray
- Publication date: 2018
- Publication place: Nigeria

Speak No Evil is a 2018 novel by Nigerian American writer Uzodinma Iweala.

In his second novel, Iweala explores the intersections of race, class, gender, sexuality, nationality and the diaspora through the story of Niru, a Nigerian-American high-school senior living in a middle-class suburb of Washington, D.C., who comes out as gay to his white straight friend Meredith. The first two thirds of the book are narrated by Niru while the last third is narrated by Meredith. Niru must learn how to negotiate his many identities: being a Black man in America, being the child of Nigerian immigrants, coming from a middle-class background, as well as being gay. Niru is forced to confront the many ways in which he is privileged, as well as disenfranchised. Iweala also interweaves themes of religion, cultural dislocation, mental health, police brutality, and more, all of which further add to and further complicate Niru's life and identities.

== Plot ==
Niru, a Nigerian-American high-school senior living in a middle-class suburb of Washington, D.C., comes out as gay to his white straight friend Meredith after rejecting her sexual advances. In an attempt to help him, Meredith downloads dating apps such as Tinder and Grindr on Niru's phone and encourages him to set up a date with a man named Ryan. When Niru misplaces his phone, his father discovers it and sees text messages from Ryan, thus outing Niru to his parents. His father responds by beating up Niru and taking him to Nigeria for "spiritual revival", as he calls it. Niru resents his father for this punishment because he hates visiting Nigeria due to how uncomfortable he feels there because of the heat and lack of amenities.

In the second half of Speak No Evil, we continue to see the struggles of intersections that occur with Niru for being a gay, black man in America. Upon Niru's return to America, he and his family attempt to go back to normal, as though nothing happened. Niru's father takes his phone and gives him a Nokia phone that has no access to the internet and that can only be used to call. Niru is required to meet weekly with their church's pastor, Reverend Olumide. Niru goes to a party after his first track meet and gets drunk, getting into a fight with Meredith and eventually being taken care of by a stranger (later revealed to be Damien). He eventually begins to form a romantic relationship with Damien, and tries to find a balance between the various worlds and spaces that he exists in: his home and school lives, where he must hide his sexual identity, and the space in which he exists with Damien. Niru begins to distance himself from everyone, including Meredith. During a somewhat sexual encounter with Damien, Niru pushes him away and leaves, leaving their relationship in a tense place. Shortly after Niru makes up with his friend Meredith. Everything comes to a head after Niru's last track meet of the school year. Niru runs away from his father, and eventually ends up going to a club with Meredith, which ends up with him getting shot by the police and dying. The final third of the novel is then told from the perspective of Meredith, and illustrates her struggles, as well as the struggles of Niru's father, to grapple with and comes to terms with the aftermath of Niru's death.
