= Jenifer Levin =

American fiction writer

- Born: October 31, 1955 (age 71)

Jenifer Levin (born October 31, 1955) is an American fiction writer, noted for her contributions to lesbian fiction. As well as writing fiction, she has contributed to the New York Times and The Washington Post. The Washington Post called her a member of the "lesbian literati". She graduated from the University of Michigan Residential College in 1977.

Levin, herself a former competitive swimmer, has set many of her novels in the world of competitive sport, receiving attention for her coverage of gender, power, and sexuality in that context. Her first novel was Water Dancer, the tale of a long-distance swimmer recovering from a nervous breakdown, whose trainer and his wife both fall in love with her. The New York Times noted that Levin involved her readers successfully in "an odd world", but criticized the characters' depth and the lack of resolution to their difficulties. Levin is Jewish and her third novel, Shimoni's Lover, was set in Israel. In 1993 she produced The Sea of Light, which the Dallas Morning News called "beautiful and probing." The Sea of Light was voted 8th in a Bywater Books (a lesbian publisher) poll of the ten most important lesbian novels of the 20th century. Her fifth published book, Love and Death and Other Disasters, collected stories written over a period between 1977 and 1995.

Levin has two sons, adopted from Cambodia. She has spoken several times of her experiences adopting as a single gay woman, from a country that does not formally allow foreign adoptions, including in a 1995 volume Wanting a Child edited by Jill Bialosky and Helen Shulman.
