= Chris Adrian =

American author (born 1970)

- Born: November 7, 1970 (age 55); Washington, D.C., U.S.
- Occupations: Author; Physician
- Writing career
- Genres: Novel; Short Story

Chris Adrian (born November 7, 1970) is an American author. Adrian's writing styles in short stories vary greatly; from modernist realism to pronounced lyrical allegory. His novels tend toward surrealism, having mostly realistic characters experience fantastic circumstances. He has written four novels: Gob's Grief, The Children's Hospital, The Great Night, and The New World. In 2008, he published A Better Angel, a collection of short stories. His short fiction has also appeared in The Paris Review, Zoetrope, Ploughshares, McSweeney's, The New Yorker, The Best American Short Stories, and Story. He was one of 11 fiction writers to receive a Guggenheim Fellowship in 2009. He lives in San Francisco.

== Early life ==
Chris Adrian was born in Washington, DC. He spent his early years in the Florida cities of Orlando and Miami and draws inspiration from his childhood for his writing. His passion for fiction first arose at age eleven after he had surgery for a testicular torsion. While recovering in the hospital, Adrian read novels and discovered his love for the fiction genre. Although Adrian is no longer religious, as he explained in a 2020 interview, faith played an essential role in his childhood identity. While he no longer practices, his continued interest in religion led him to study at Harvard Divinity School.

== Education ==
Adrian completed his bachelor's degree in English from the University of Florida in 1993. He received his M.D. from Eastern Virginia Medical School in 2001. He completed a pediatric residency at the University of California, San Francisco, was a student at Harvard Divinity School, and a fellow of pediatric hematology/oncology at UCSF in 2011. He is also a graduate of the Iowa Writers' Workshop. Currently, Adrian serves as the Assistant Professor of Pediatrics at Columbia University Medical Center.

== Bibliography ==
=== Novels ===
- Gob's Grief (2001)
- The Children's Hospital (2006)
- The Great Night (2011)
- The New World, with Eli Horowitz (2015)

=== Short story collections ===
- A Better Angel (collection, 2008, FSG) includes:
  - High Speeds (1997) (originally published in Story)
  - The Sum of Our Parts (1999) (originally published in Ploughshares)
  - Stab (2006) (originally published in Zoetrope: All-Story)
  - The Vision of Peter Damien (2007) (originally published in Zoetrope: All-Story)
  - A Better Angel (2006) (originally published in The New Yorker)
  - The Changeling (2007) (originally published in Esquire as "Promise Breaker")
  - A Hero of Chickamauga (1999) (originally published in Story)
  - A Child's Book of Sickness and Death (2004) (originally published in McSweeney's 14)
  - Why Antichrist? (2007) (originally published in Tin House)
- Uncollected
  - You Can Have It (1996) (published in The Paris Review 141)
  - Grief (1997) (published in Story)
  - Every Night for a Thousand Years (1997) (published in The New Yorker)
  - Horse and Horseman (1998) (published in Zoetrope: All-Story) Available online
  - The Glass House (2000) (published in The New Yorker)
  - The Stepfather (2005) (published in McSweeney's 18)
  - A Tiny Feast (2009) (published in The New Yorker)
  - The Black Square (2009) (published in McSweeney's 32)
  - The Warm Fuzzies (2010) (published in The New Yorker)
  - Grand Rounds (2012) (published in Granta 120)
