= Lovers' Legends: The Gay Greek Myths =

2002 book by Andrew Calimach

- Author: Andrew Calimach
- Publication date: 2002
- ISBN: 0-9714686-0-5

Lovers' Legends: The Gay Greek Myths (ISBN 0-9714686-0-5) is a 2002 book by Andrew Calimach about homosexuality and paederasty in Greek myth.

== Lovers' Legends Unbound ==
Lovers' Legends Unbound is a theatrical production directed by Agnes Lev, performed by Timothy Carter, with incidental music composed and performed by Steve Gorn. The work was released by Haiduk Press in 2004 as an audio-CD together with an illustrated libretto.

== Table of Contents ==
- Beloved Charioteers
- Different Loves – Part I
- Tantalus and the Olympians
- Pelops in Pisa
- Laius and Goldenhorse
- Different Loves – Part II
- Zeus and Ganymede
- Hercules and Hylas
- Orpheus
- Different Loves – Part III
- Apollo and Hyacinthus
- Narcissus
- Achilles and Patroclus
- Different Loves – Part IV

Framing the tales is Pseudo-Lucian's "Different Loves".
