= Father of Frankenstein =

1995 novel by Christopher Bram

- Author: Christopher Bram
- Language: English
- Publisher: E. P. Dutton
- Publication date: April 1995
- Media type: Print
- Pages: 288pp
- ISBN: 0-525-93913-X

Father of Frankenstein is a 1995 novel by Christopher Bram that speculates on the last days of the life of film director James Whale. Whale was an openly gay filmmaker and a pioneer in the horror film genre, directing such groundbreaking works as the 1931 Frankenstein and 1933's The Invisible Man.

In 1998, Ian McKellen played Whale in the film adaptation of Bram's book, titled Gods and Monsters. The story has also been turned into a British play of the same title as the film which premiered in London at the Southwark Playhouse in February 2015. Another play version written for France is rather based on the novel and will be released in 2017.

== Synopsis ==
James Whale has just had a stroke. He is convinced that his time has come to die. Increasingly confused and disoriented, his mind is overwhelmed by images of the past – from his working-class childhood in Britain, the trenches of World War I, and the lavish glamour of Hollywood premieres in the 1930s.

Whale asks his new gardener, a Marine veteran named Clayton Boone, to come to his studio for some portrait sittings. Boone is uncomfortable with Whale's homosexuality but also fascinated by the chance to know a famous Hollywood director and so, despite his apprehensions, the relationship continues.

Boone begins to think of Whale as a friend. But one night after they return from a Hollywood garden party, Whale makes an advance at Boone, trying to make him so angry that he will kill Whale. The old man wants to die; he wants his death to have a human face, Boone's face. Boone refuses and is very upset. Whale apologizes–he knows he is going insane. The next morning, Whale understands that he is ready to cross over, alone. He drowns himself in his backyard swimming pool.
