= Avoidance (novel) =

2002 novel by Michael Lowenthal

- Author: Michael Lowenthal
- Language: English
- Genre: Novel
- Publisher: Graywolf Press
- Publication date: 1 November 2002
- Publication place: United States
- Media type: Paperback
- Pages: 272 p. (paperback edition)
- ISBN: 1-55597-367-1 (paperback edition)
- OCLC: 50852516
- Dewey Decimal: 813/.54 22
- LC Class: PS3562.O894 A98 2002

This is an article about a book. For the non-confrontational method of handling conflict, see avoidance (conflict).

Avoidance is a 2002 novel by Michael Lowenthal. It was nominated for a Lambda Literary Award in 2003.

Avoidance explores the topics of child sexual abuse, hebephilia and pederasty. It is also about social conventions and mores, and ways in which they depend on environment and upbringing.

== Plot summary ==
Jeremy is a 28-year-old man working at the summer camp where he spent a childhood summer and where he found a true sense of family after the death of his father. Jeremy now works at the camp as an assistant director.

He becomes infatuated with Max, a disturbed 14-year-old. When Max confides in him that he has been sexually abused by the camp director, who was a victim of sexual abuse himself, Jeremy realizes just how close he came to actually committing the same crime.
