= The Great Night (novel) =

2011 novel by Chris Adrian

- Kindle cover
- Author: Chris Adrian
- Language: English
- Genre: Magical realism
- Publisher: Farrar, Straus and Giroux
- Publication date: April 26, 2011
- Publication place: United States
- Media type: Print (hardcover)
- Pages: 292 pp.
- ISBN: 978-0374166410
- Preceded by: The Children's Hospital

The Great Night is a 2011 novel by American author Chris Adrian. Billed as a retelling of William Shakespeare's A Midsummer Night's Dream, the novel details the interaction on one night between the faerie kingdom about to be destroyed and three mortals heartbroken over lost relationships.

== Plot ==
Henry Blork, Molly and Will enter Buena Vista Park in San Francisco on the way to a party at a house nearby. Each is forlorn over the loss of a relationship: Henry's obsessive–compulsive disorder had driven away his boyfriend Bobby; Will has lost his girlfriend Carolina because of his infidelity; and Molly's boyfriend Ryan has hanged himself.

A hill in the park houses the local faerie kingdom, ruled by Titania and Oberon. Oberon has vanished after their son, whom Oberon had stolen for Titania, died of leukemia. Grieved at the yearlong absence of her husband, Titania releases Puck, a powerful and antagonistic demon, from his thousand-year-old bond, hoping that the ensuing destruction will compel Oberon to return. The spell that unbinds Puck traps everyone in the park, and over the course of the night, Henry, Molly and Will's histories are related by flashbacks.

Henry had no recollection of the years he had been missing as a child. As it happens, he himself was a changeling, stolen by Puck to be his companion. But Henry grew too old and Oberon and Titania banished him. Henry's memory of his captivity was erased and he was expelled into the city, where he was discovered by Mike, who, with Ryan, runs an orphanage of sorts for the many changelings in the city. After one of the other boys makes fun of Henry's homosexuality, Henry leaves the house and, found by a police officer, tells her about the house. The police assume Mike was molesting the children; Mike is killed in a raid in the house, while Ryan escapes and Henry is returned to his family. Several years later, Henry and Bobby fall in love, but Henry's OCD destroys their relationship. Henry moves to San Francisco, where he is one of the doctors who unsuccessfully treats Titania and Oberon's son's leukemia.

Molly grew up in a zealously Christian home. She drops out of seminary because of a crisis of faith and begins working at a flower store where she meets Ryan. They begin dating, and Molly is swiftly and wholly smitten. But the dissatisfaction Molly had sensed in Ryan manifests when he hangs himself in the same house he had shared with the changelings years before. Over the course of the night in the park, Molly learns that Ryan was himself a changeling and realizes that he killed himself because he wanted to return to the world of the faeries but could not.

Will falls in love with Carolina, Ryan's sister, after she hires him to cure the dying tree in her brother's old home, where she now lives. He and she bond over their shared loss of a brother, as Will's brother Sean had died years before as well. But Will slowly grows dissatisfied with their relationship, and takes part in a wild sex romp at the house of a woman whose trees he had cured. Carolina dumps Will, and destroys the tree he had cured for her, after the woman sends pictures of the orgy to their house.

Five homeless people are also trapped in the park. They were rehearsing a musical based on the movie Soylent Green because their leader believes the mayor is trying to solve the homeless problem in the city by kidnapping homeless people and then chopping them up and serving them to other homeless people in a stew.

Henry, Molly and Will, who have been meandering around the park trying to find the party, are shuffled into the faerie kingdom under the hill by well-meaning faeries who hope to delay their inevitable destruction at the hands of Puck. But it is all for naught: having just had a threesome, they are discovered by Puck, who immediately recognizes Henry as the child he had stolen and lost twenty years before. Puck chains the naked Will and Molly to a wagon and plops Henry down on a pillow next to him.

The storylines converge after Puck and the three mortals arrive atop the hill. Puck had magically married the lead homeless person to Titania, forcing her and her faeries to help him with the musical. While watching the musical, Henry realizes what Puck will do if not stopped, and so he allows Titania to kill him. His death allows Titania some measure of vengeance on the doctor who was unable to save her son, and it also aggrieves Puck, who had loved Henry. Weakened by his sadness, Puck is defeated by the faeries and bound again to Titania's power.

In the aftermath, Henry uses the last of the magic left to him from his time in the faerie kingdom to charge a squirrel with telling Bobby what has happened. Molly and Will are told to leave the park, and Henry hopes they will fall in love. The homeless people are sent back to whatever box they were living in. And the faeries leave to find a new home.

== Reception ==
The novel was well received by critics.
