= The Farewell Symphony =

1997 semi-autobiographical novel by Edmund White

- Cover of the first US edition
- Author: Edmund White
- Cover artist: Chip Kidd
- Language: English
- Genre: Autobiographical novel
- Publisher: Alfred A. Knopf
- Publication date: 1997
- Publication place: United States
- Media type: Print (hardback & paperback)
- Pages: 413
- ISBN: 0-679-43477-1
- OCLC: 37538014
- Dewey Decimal: 813/.54 21
- LC Class: PS3573.H463 F37 1997
- Preceded by: The Beautiful Room Is Empty

The Farewell Symphony is a 1997 semi-autobiographical novel by Edmund White.

It is the third of a trilogy of novels, being preceded by A Boy's Own Story (1982) and The Beautiful Room Is Empty (1988). It depicts the later adulthood of its unnamed protagonist and documents his experience of homosexuality from the late 1960s to the 1990s. Each of the three novels in this series assumes a progression in tone and style which may be measured in part by the sexual content, which starts in A Boy's Own Story, expands in The Beautiful Room Is Empty and becomes more detailed in The Farewell Symphony.

While the first two novels in the series are relatively short and come in at around 220 pages, The Farewell Symphony is considerably longer at over 400 pages. Another distinguishing characteristic that sets The Farewell Symphony apart from its predecessors is that the former were largely concerned with struggle, whereas in the third volume, the protagonist encounters gradually increasing professional success and is thus initiated into the American literary elite, whilst continuing to deal with personal struggles as well as the onset of the AIDS epidemic. This changes the tone and flow of The Farewell Symphony in comparison with the previous two installments, with the tone and direction changing on multiple occasions.

== Allusions to other works ==
The title alludes to the "Farewell" Symphony by Joseph Haydn.

== Reception ==
Writing in The Wall Street Journal, the journalist James Wolcott suggested that the book "might have been more honestly titled Hilly Buttocks I Have Known," wherein the author "invites us to join him as he revisits the beloved rear ends of yesteryear. This is not the sort of invitation many people will leap to accept." Wolcott concluded, "Edmund White the writer has given way to Edmund White the trashy raconteur. It's the same fate that befell Truman Capote, and it wasn't pretty then either." Publishers Weekly gave the novel a starred review, praising the "luminous snapshots of New York, Paris and Rome and [...] vital parade of men—dowdy, forbiddingly gorgeous, sylph-like, ephebic, closeted, defiantly and militantly out—that crowd its pages." Katherine Knorr, in a review for The New York Times, applauded The Farewell Symphony for its handling of the AIDS crisis, and noting the novel's "dramatic" nature.
