= Edmund White =

American writer (1940–2025)

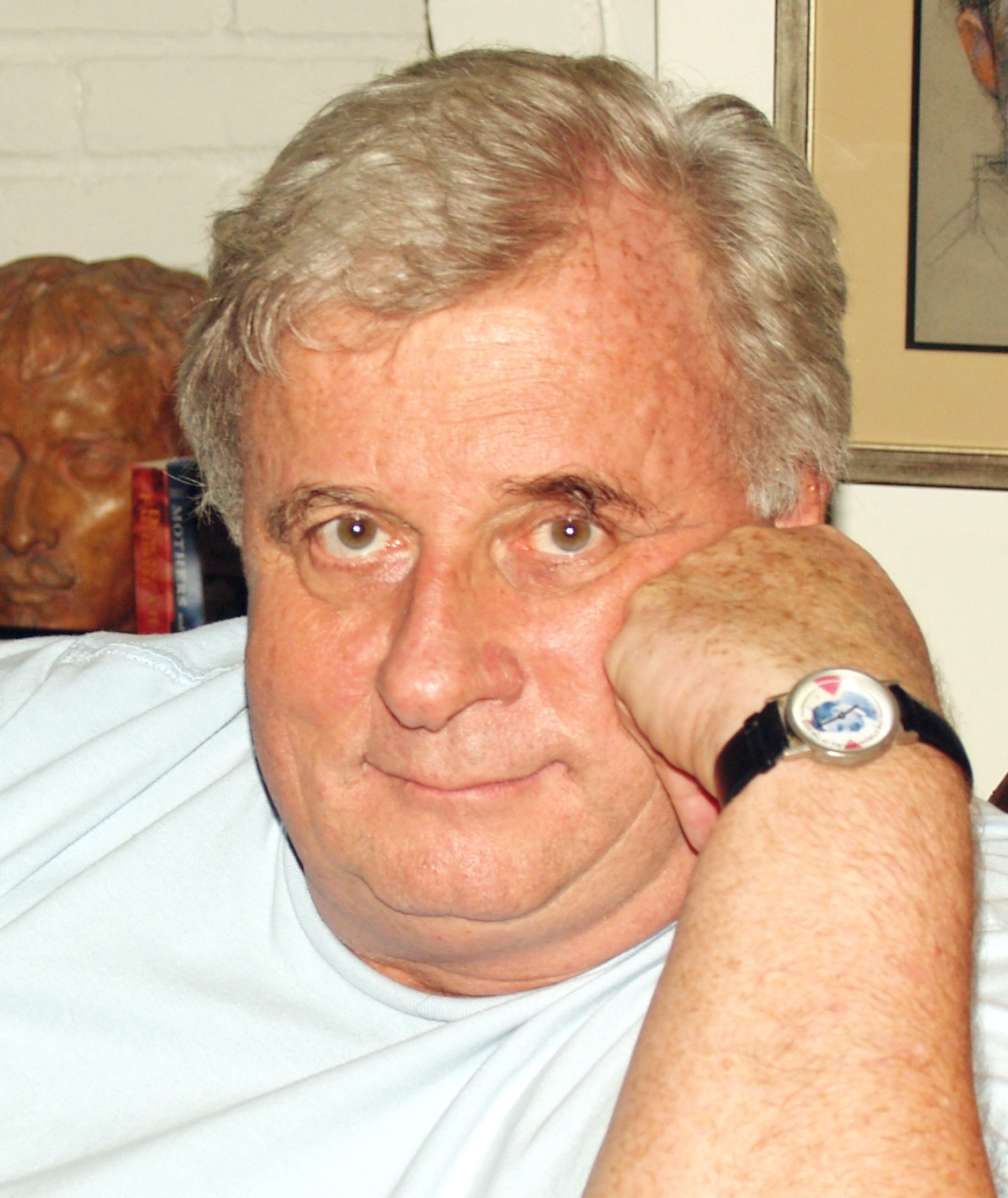
- White in 2007
- Born: Edmund Valentine White III; January 13, 1940; Cincinnati, Ohio, U.S.
- Died: June 3, 2025 (aged 85); New York City, U.S.
- Education: University of Michigan
- Occupations: Novelist; short story writer; non-fiction writer
- Spouse: Michael Carroll (m. 2013)
- Writing career
- Period: 1973–2025
- Notable works: Forgetting Elena (1973); Nocturnes for the King of Naples (1978); States of Desire (1980); A Boy's Own Story (1982); The Beautiful Room Is Empty (1988); The Farewell Symphony (1997)
- Notable awards: Guggenheim Fellowship; 1983; National Book Critics Circle Award for Biography; 1993; Officier de l'Ordre des Arts et des Lettres; 1993; PEN/Saul Bellow Award for Achievement in American Fiction; 2018
- Website: edmundwhite.com (archived)

Edmund Valentine White III (January 13, 1940 – June 3, 2025) was an American novelist, memoirist, playwright, biographer and essayist. A pioneering figure in LGBTQ and especially gay literature after the Stonewall riots, he wrote with rare candor about gay identity, relationships, and sex. His work emerged as part of an increasingly solidified and visible LGBTQ community, helping to reshape public narratives at a time when coming out was still a dangerous, even radical act. His writing, noted for intimate depth and literary elegance, includes the semi-autobiographical trilogy A Boy's Own Story (1982), The Beautiful Room Is Empty (1988), and The Farewell Symphony (1997). He also co-authored The Joy of Gay Sex (1977), promoting sex-positive discourse.

Born in Cincinnati and raised outside Chicago, White studied Chinese at the University of Michigan after initially declining admission to Harvard University in order to adhere to conversion therapy. He later declined Harvard again to follow a lover to New York City, where he worked at Time Life and launched his literary career. His debut, Forgetting Elena (1973), was praised by Vladimir Nabokov. White joined The Violet Quill, a gay writers' group instrumental in the development of contemporary LGBTQ literature, in 1980.

During the 1980s United States AIDS epidemic, he co-founded the Gay Men's Health Crisis and wove themes of illness and resilience into his writing. He spent many of these years in France, forming intellectual and social ties with figures like Michel Foucault. Among the first public figures to speak openly about his HIV-positive status when diagnosed, White remained healthy as a long-term nonprogressor to AIDS. He began a lasting open relationship with his husband, writer Michael Carroll, whom he married in 2013. White became a professor in the 1990s, teaching writing at universities like Brown and Princeton.

Described as the "first major queer novelist to champion a new generation of writers" and the "patron saint of queer literature", White received numerous honors, including the Lambda Literary's Visionary Award, the National Book Foundation's Lifetime Achievement Award, and the PEN/Saul Bellow Award for Achievement in American Fiction. He also wrote biographies of Jean Genet, Marcel Proust, and Arthur Rimbaud, plus memoirs My Lives (2005) and City Boy (2009). France made him Chevalier (1993) and later Officier de l'Ordre des Arts et des Lettres.

== Early life and education ==
Edmund White was born in Cincinnati on January 13, 1940. He was the son of Delilah "Lila Mae" and Edmund White, II, a civil engineer and entrepreneur.

He was raised in Cincinnati and Evanston, Illinois, and spent most of his childhood in the Chicago area. Beginning in the middle of his second year of high school, he attended Cranbrook School in Michigan.

At Cranbrook, he was an honors student and penned two novels, one his first gay novel, and the other a story about a divorced woman that began as a writing assignment for a creative writing class. He graduated from Cranbrook in 1958.

As he recounted in his novel The Beautiful Room Is Empty, White was accepted to Harvard, but chose to stay near his therapist at home, who had assured White he could "cure" his homosexuality through conversion therapy. He majored in Chinese at the University of Michigan.

White declined admission to Harvard University's Chinese doctoral program in favor of following a lover to New York City. There, he freelanced for Newsweek, and spent seven years working as a staffer at Time-Life Books. After briefly relocating to Rome, San Francisco, and then returning to New York, he was briefly employed as an editor for the Saturday Review when the magazine was based in San Francisco in the early 1970s; after the magazine folded in 1973, White returned to New York to edit Horizon (a quarterly cultural journal) and freelance as a writer and editor for entities such as Time-Life and The New Republic.

== Literary career ==
=== Early career ===
White wrote books and plays while a youth, including one unpublished novel titled Mrs Morrigan.

White's debut novel, Forgetting Elena (1973), set on an island, can be read as commenting on gay culture in a coded manner. The Russian-American novelist Vladimir Nabokov called it "a marvelous book".

Written with his psychotherapist Charles Silverstein, The Joy of Gay Sex (1977) made him known to a wider readership. It is celebrated for its sex-positive tone.

His next novel, Nocturnes for the King of Naples (1978) was explicitly gay-themed and drew on his own life.

From 1980 to 1981, White was a member of a gay writers' group, The Violet Quill, which met briefly during that period, and included Andrew Holleran and Felice Picano. White's autobiographic works are frank and unapologetic about his promiscuity and his HIV-positive status.

In 1980, White brought out States of Desire, a survey of some aspects of gay life in America. In 1982, he helped found the group Gay Men's Health Crisis in New York City. In the same year appeared White's best-known work, A Boy's Own Story, the first volume of an autobiographic-fiction series, continuing with The Beautiful Room Is Empty (1988) and The Farewell Symphony (1997), which describes stages in the life of a gay man from boyhood to middle age. Several characters in the latter novel are recognizably based on well-known people from White's New York-centered literary and artistic milieu.

=== Life in France ===
From 1983 to 1990, White lived in France. He moved there initially for one year in 1983 via the Guggenheim Fellowship for writing he had received, but took such a liking to Paris ("with its drizzle, as cool, grey and luxurious as chinchilla" as described in his autobiographical novel The Farewell Symphony) that he stayed there for longer. French philosopher Michel Foucault invited him for dinner several times, dismissing White's concerns about HIV/AIDS as puritanical. They attended the Paris Opera together, including a Regietheater production of an opera by Jean-Philippe Rameau, before Foucault died of the illness in 1984.

After discovering he was HIV-positive around the same time, White joined the French HIV/AIDS organization, AIDES. During this period, he brought out his novel, Caracole (1985), which centers on heterosexual relationships. He maintained a lifelong interest in France and French literature, writing biographies of Jean Genet, Marcel Proust, and Arthur Rimbaud. He published Genet: a biography (1993), Our Paris: sketches from memory (1995), Marcel Proust (1998), The Flaneur: a stroll through the paradoxes of Paris (2000), and Rimbaud: The Double Life of a Rebel (2008). He spent seven years writing the biography of Genet.

=== Return to United States ===
White returned to the United States in 1997. The Married Man, a novel published in 2000, is gay-themed and draws on White's life. Fanny: A Fiction (2003) is a historical novel about novelist Frances Trollope and social reformer Frances Wright in early 19th-century America. White's 2006 play Terre Haute (produced in New York City in 2009) portrays discussions that take place when a prisoner, based on terrorist bomber Timothy McVeigh, is visited by a writer based on Gore Vidal. (In real life McVeigh and Vidal corresponded but did not meet.)

In 2005 White published his autobiography, My Lives—organized by theme rather than chronology—and in 2009 his memoir of New York life in the 1960s and 1970s, City Boy.

White taught at Brown University in the early 1990s, and in 1999 became professor of creative writing in Princeton University's Lewis Center for the Arts.

In 2025, at the age 85, White published a sex memoir, The Loves of My Life, which received a positive review in Publishers Weekly. White died few months later after publication.

== Personal life ==
White, a gay man, was at the Stonewall Inn in 1969 when the riots began as events solidifying a sense of community, making LGBTQ movements in the United States more cohesive and publicly visible in the wake of the civil rights movement. He later wrote, "Ours may have been the first funny revolution." "When someone shouted 'Gay is good' in imitation of 'Black is beautiful', we all laughed ... Then I caught myself foolishly imagining that gays might someday constitute a community rather than a diagnosis". "Up until that moment we had all thought homosexuality was a medical term," he explained. "Suddenly we saw that we could be a minority group—with rights, a culture, an agenda."

Though raised Christian Scientist, White was atheist. He discovered he was HIV-positive in 1985. However, he was a non-progressor, one of the small percentage of cases that have not led to AIDS. He was in a long-term open relationship with the American writer Michael Carroll, living with him from 1995 onward. They married in November 2013.

In June 2012, Carroll reported that White was making a "remarkable" recovery after suffering two strokes in previous months. He also had a heart attack.

In a 2023 interview with Colm Tóibín, White stated that he had previously dated writer Tony Heilbut.

On June 3, 2025, White died at his home in Chelsea, Manhattan, while suffering from an apparent gastroenteritis infection. He was 85. He is survived by his husband, Michael, and his sister, Margaret.

== Legacy and influences ==
White is frequently noted as a major influence on gay American writers and literature. The Publishing Triangle named their award for Début LGBT Fiction the Edmund White Award.

French writer Édouard Louis has said, "In France, White's books are not just considered important on a literary level—they're also a fundamental step in the construction of the gay self." Other writers of note who have cited his influence include Garth Greenwell, Garrard Conley, and Alexander Chee.

In his 2005 memoir My Lives, White cited Jean Genet, Marcel Proust, and André Gide as influences, writing: "they convinced me that homosexuality was crucial to the development of the modern novel because it led to a resurrection of love, a profound skepticism about the naturalness of gender roles and a revival of the classical tradition of same-sex love that dominated Western poetry and prose until the birth of Christ".

His favorite living writers in the early 1970s were Vladimir Nabokov and Christopher Isherwood.

== Awards and honors ==
White received numerous awards and distinctions. He was the recipient of the inaugural Bill Whitehead Award for Lifetime Achievement from Publishing Triangle in 1989. He was also the namesake of the aforementioned organization's Edmund White Award for Debut Fiction.

In 2014, Edmund White was presented with the Bonham Centre Award from the Mark S. Bonham Centre for Sexual Diversity Studies of the University of Toronto, for his contributions to the advancement and education of issues around sexual identification.

- 1983: Guggenheim Fellowship for Creative Arts
- 1988: Lambda Literary Award, for The Beautiful Room Is Empty
- 1989: Bill Whitehead Award for Lifetime Achievement
- 1992: Lambda Literary Award nomination, for Faber Book of Gay Short Fiction
- 1993: David R. Kessler Award in LGBTQ Studies, CLAGS: The Center for LGBTQ Studies
- 1993: National Book Critics Circle Award for Biography, for Genet
- 1993: Chevalier (and later Officier) de l'Ordre des Arts et des Lettres
- 1994: Pulitzer Prize for Biography or Autobiography nomination, for Genet: A Biography
- 1994: Lambda Literary Award, for Genet: A Biography
- 1996: Member, American Academy of Arts and Letters
- 1996: Lambda Literary Award nomination, for Our Paris
- 1998: Lambda Literary Award nomination, for The Farewell Symphony
- 2001: Lambda Literary Award nomination, for The Married Man
- 2002: Stonewall Book Award for Loss Within Loss: Artists in the Age of AIDS
- 2016–2018: New York State Edith Wharton Citation of Merit
- 2018: PEN/Saul Bellow Award for Achievement in American Fiction
- 2019: National Book Foundation, Lifetime Achievement Award

== Works ==
=== Fiction ===
- Forgetting Elena (1973), ISBN 978-0345358622
- Nocturnes for the King of Naples (1978), ISBN 9780312022631, OCLC 17953397
- A Boy's Own Story (1982), ISBN 9781509813865, OCLC 952160890
- Caracole (1985), ISBN 9780679764168, OCLC 490872532
- The Beautiful Room Is Empty (1988), ISBN 9780679755401
- Skinned Alive: Stories (1995), ISBN 9780679754756
- The Farewell Symphony (1997), ISBN 978-0701136215
- The Married Man (2000), ISBN 978-0679781448
- Fanny: A Fiction (2003), ISBN 978-0701169718
- Chaos: A Novella and Stories (2007), ISBN 9780786720057
- Hotel de Dream (2007), ISBN 978-0060852252
- Jack Holmes and His Friend (2012), ISBN 9781608197255, OCLC 877992500
- Our Young Man (2016), ISBN 9781408858967, OCLC 1002723765
- A Saint from Texas (2020), ISBN 9781635572551
- A Previous Life (2022), ISBN 9781526632241
- The Humble Lover (2023), ISBN 9781639730889

=== Plays ===
- Terre Haute (2006), ISBN 978-0713687941

=== Nonfiction ===
- The Joy of Gay Sex, with Charles Silverstein (1977), ISBN 9780517531587
- States of Desire (1980), ISBN 9780525480686
- The Burning Library: Writings on Art, Politics and Sexuality 1969–1993 (1994), ISBN 9780679434757, OCLC 33488913
- The Flâneur: A Stroll Through the Paradoxes of Paris (2000), ISBN 978-0747596875
- Arts and Letters (2004), ISBN 9781573442480, OCLC 69485728
- Sacred Monsters (2011), ISBN 9781936833115

==== Biography ====
- Genet: A Biography (1993), ISBN 9780099450078, OCLC 61423716
- Marcel Proust (1998), ISBN 9780143114987, OCLC 233547908
- Rimbaud: The Double Life of a Rebel (2008), ISBN 9781843549710, OCLC 600721506

==== Memoirs ====
- Our Paris: Sketches from Memory (1995), ISBN 9780060085926
- My Lives (2005), ISBN 978-0066213972
- City Boy (2009), ISBN 9781608192342, OCLC 667235827
- Inside a Pearl: My Years in Paris (2014), ISBN 9781620406335, OCLC 881092866
- The Unpunished Vice: A Life of Reading (2018), ISBN 9781635571172
- The Loves of My Life: A Sex Memoir (2025), ISBN 978-1639733729

==== Anthologies ====
- The Darker Proof: Stories from a Crisis, with Adam Mars-Jones (1988)
- In Another Part of the Forest: An Anthology of Gay Short Fiction (1994), ISBN 978-0517881569
- The Art of the Story (2000), ISBN 978-0140296389
- A Fine Excess: Contemporary Literature at Play (2001), ISBN 9781889330518

== See also ==
- LGBTQ culture in New York City
- List of American novelists
- List of LGBTQ people from New York City
- List of LGBTQ writers
- NYC Pride March
