= Philip Gambone =

American writer (born 1948)

- Born: July 21, 1948 (age 78); Wakefield, Massachusetts, U.S.
- Education: Harvard College (BA); Episcopal Divinity School (MA)
- Occupation: Writer
- Writing career
- Genres: Fiction; non-fiction
- Website: www.philipgambone.com

Philip Gambone (born July 21, 1948) is an American writer who has published both fiction and non-fiction.

== Biography ==
Philip Gambone was born in Wakefield, Massachusetts, on July 21, 1948. He earned a BA from Harvard College and an MA from the Episcopal Divinity School. His writing has covered many genres, including novels and short stories, personal reminiscence, non-fiction, and scholarly essays, as well as book reviews and interviews.

He has published 4 book-length works, beginning with a collection of short stories titled The Language We Use Up Here in 1991. It was nominated for a Lambda Literary Award, and a review in Harvard Magazine called it "quietly inspired". Other short stories have appeared in a wide variety of magazines and anthologies. Something Inside: Conversations with Gay Fiction Writers appeared in 1999. Publishers Weekly said his "carefully probing interviews provide insight into the working methods and aesthetic, personal and social concerns of a varied group" and that his "knowledge of each writer's work and his sensitivity to the craft is impressive". The Montreal Mirror called it "a rich collective portrait of some of the most important and interesting gay writers of the last three decades". Among the 21 included were Joseph Hansen, Edmund White, and David Leavitt.

His first novel, Beijing: A Novel, appeared in 2003. Multicultural Review noted that "What makes the book of special interest to readers of multicultural literature is its portrayal of an honest effort to see, understand, and become emotionally involved in another culture without being patronizing or distant".

Another collection of non-fiction pieces based on interviews appeared in 2010 under the title Travels in a Gay Nation: Portraits of LGBTQ Americans. Andrew Holleran wrote that it was "like going to dinner with people you'd love to know but don't" and called Phil Gambone "the perfect stand-in for the reader: impressively prepared, sympathetic, and smart". He drew his 44 subjects from every corner of the gay community, including, for example, composer Jennifer Higdon, Star Trek's George Takei, and anti-war activist Mandy Carter.

Gambone has also published essays about China and Chinese literature in such publications as the Boston Globe and the New York Times. He has also contributed essays to textbooks about both ancient and modern China.

His many awards include artist's fellowships granted by the Massachusetts Cultural Council, the MacDowell Colony, and the Helene Wurlitzer Foundation, as well as a research fellowship from the Massachusetts Historical Society. Best American Short Stories, 1989 (Houghton Mifflin, 1990) recognized his work as well.

Gambone has taught writing at the University of Massachusetts Boston and Boston College. He has also taught in the expository writing program at Harvard. He teaches in the writing program at the Harvard Extension School, which has twice awarded him Distinguished Teaching Citations.

Gambone served 27 years on the faculty at The Park School in Brookline, Massachusetts, and taught English at Boston University Academy until retiring in 2017. He lives in Boston, Massachusetts.

== Works ==
Nonfiction

- Gambone, Philip (1999). Something inside : conversations with gay fiction writers. Madison, Wisconsin: Univ. of Wisconsin Press. ISBN 978-0-299-16130-9.
- Gambone, Philip (2010). Travels in a gay nation : portraits of LGBTQ Americans. Madison, Wisconsin: University of Wisconsin Press. ISBN 978-0-299-23684-7.
- Gambone, Philip (2020). As Far As I Can Tell: Finding My Father in World War II. Rattling Good Yarns Press. ISBN 978-1734146462.

Fiction

- Gambone, Philip (1991). The language we use up here : and other stories. New York: Dutton. ISBN 978-0-525-93311-3.
- Gambone, Philip (2003). Beijing : a novel. Madison, Wisconsin: University of Wisconsin Press. ISBN 978-0-299-18490-2.

Scholarly articles

- "An Introduction to Sixteenth-Century China"
- "War Continues, 1945-1949"
- "China in the South Seas"
- "Gary Glickman" in Emmanuel Nelson, ed., Contemporary Gay American Novelists (Greenwood, 1993)
- "Frank Kameny" in American National Biography (Oxford University Press, 2014)
