= Fenton Johnson =

American writer and professor of English and LGBT Studies (born 1953)

John Fenton Johnson
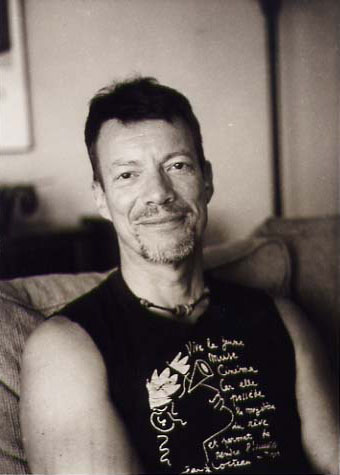
- Born: October 25, 1953 (age 72); Kentucky, United States
- Occupation: Author
- Writing career
- Pen name: Fenton Johnson
- Website: www.fentonjohnson.com

John Fenton Johnson is an American writer and professor of English and LGBT Studies at the University of Arizona.

== Life ==
Johnson was born the youngest of nine children in south-central Kentucky to a father who worked as a distiller. At 17 Jonson won a full scholarship to Stanford University where he graduated in 1975 with a B.A. in English. He would go on to earn an M.F.A in creative writing from the Iowa Writers Workshop.

In February 2016, University Press of Kentucky marked Fenton Johnson's place in the literature of the state, region, and nation by publishing a new novel, The Man Who Loved Birds, at the same time that it reissued his earlier novels Crossing the River and Scissors, Paper, Rock. Johnson is also the author of three cover essays in Harper's Magazine, most recently (April, 2015) Going It Alone: The Dignity and Challenge of Solitude, available for reading through his webpage. Links to his media appearances, on Terry Gross's Fresh Air and on Kentucky Educational Television, may be found on his webpage.

His nonfiction book Keeping Faith: A Skeptic's Journey draws on time spent living as a member of the monastic communities of the Trappist Abbey of Gethsemani in Kentucky and the San Francisco Zen Center as a means to examining what it means to a skeptic to have and keep faith. Keeping Faith weaves frank conversations with Trappist and Buddhist monks with a history of the contemplative life and meditations from Johnson's experience of the virtue we call faith. It received the 2004 Kentucky Literary Award for Nonfiction and the 2004 Lambda Literary Award for best LGBT creative nonfiction.

Johnson is also the author of Geography of the Heart: A Memoir(1996) which received a Lambda Literary Award and the American Library Association Award for best gay/lesbian nonfiction.

Everywhere Home: A Life in Essays, a compilation of Johnson's new and selected essays, was published in 2017.

His most current work, At the Center of All Beauty: The Dignity and Challenge of Solitude, was published March 10, 2020 by W. W. Norton & Company. This extended piece of non-fiction is a book-length meditation based on his 2016 cover essay in Harper's Magazine.

== Awards ==
He has received awards from the Wallace Stegner and James Michener Fellowships in Fiction and National Endowment for the Arts Fellowships in both fiction and creative nonfiction. He has also received a Kentucky Literary Award, two Lambda Literary Awards for best creative nonfiction, as well as the American Library Association's Stonewall Book Award for best gay/lesbian nonfiction. He received a 2007 fellowship from the John Simon Guggenheim Foundation to support completion of his third novel and to begin research and writing on a nonfiction project.

== Bibliography ==
=== Novels ===
- Crossing the river. Birch Lane Press. 1991.
  - Crossing the river. University Press of Kentucky. 2016 [1991].
- Scissors, Paper, Rock (1994), Washington Square Press; (February, 2016) University Press of Kentucky
- The Man Who Loved Birds (February, 2016), University Press of Kentucky

=== Memoirs ===
- Geography of the Heart: A Memoir (1996), Scribner's; (1997) Washington Square Press.

=== Nonfiction ===
- Keeping Faith: A Skeptic's Journey. Houghton Mifflin Harcourt. 2004. ISBN 978-0-618-49237-4.; (2005) Mariner Books.
- Everywhere Home: A Life in Essays, Sarabande Books (2017)
- "The future of queer : a manifesto". Essay. Harper's Magazine. 336 (2012): 27–34. January 2018.
- At the Center of All Beauty: Solitude and the Creative Life. WM Norton. 2020. ISBN 9780393608298.; (2020) WM Norton
