= The Beautiful Room Is Empty =

1988 semi-autobiographical novel by Edmund White

- Cover of the Vintage Books edition
- Author: Edmund White
- Language: English
- Genre: Autobiographical novel
- Publisher: Alfred A. Knopf
- Publication date: 1988
- Publication place: United States
- Media type: Print (hardback & paperback)
- Pages: 227
- ISBN: 0-394-56444-8
- OCLC: 17325874
- Dewey Decimal: 813/.54 19
- LC Class: PS3573.H463 B43 1988
- Preceded by: A Boy's Own Story
- Followed by: The Farewell Symphony

The Beautiful Room Is Empty is a 1988 semi-autobiographical novel by Edmund White.

It is the second of a trilogy of novels, being preceded by A Boy's Own Story (1982) and followed by The Farewell Symphony (1997). It depicts the adolescence and early adulthood of its protagonist, and documents his experience of homosexuality in the 1950s and 1960s, ending with the Stonewall riots of 1969.

== Plot ==
The novel charts a nameless protagonist through his prep school, then on to the University of Michigan, and then to New York as it moves into the social turmoil of the 1960s. He moves from self hatred and disgust at his homosexuality and compulsive sexual behaviour towards a gradual acceptance of himself. He undergoes psychiatric therapy, with the belief that he wants to become heterosexual; however, his psychiatrist Dr. O'Reilly cannot help him, and is himself committed following addiction to drugs and alcohol. The narrator develops friendships and romances with Maria, a lesbian sculptor and Stalinist; Lou, a poet and drug addict; and Sean, a dancer who cannot accept his own homosexuality. The novel ends with a recounting of the events of the Stonewall riots following a police raid.

== Reviews ==
The New York Times wrote that "At first, certain passages are disturbing both because they are repellent and because one isn't certain how Mr. White means us to take them... The effect of this is to maneuver the reader into an unusual position. So powerful are the narrator's descriptions of his urges compared with his tortured attempts to deny them that we begin to side with Dionysus against Apollo. Instead of wanting him to find the "cause" of and the "cure" for his homosexuality, we find ourselves wearying of his search and wishing him simply to accept his desires."

Literary Review wrote that "Every other line of this exquisitely written, cheeringly humane novel conveys its gladdening sentiments, compulsive narrative and precise wit with elegance and virtuosity... [White] answers the possible objection that the supple movement of the book, fox after hare, cannot accommodate profoundly dramatic incident by agreeing that all his plots are scrapbooks, and that a snapshot memory can have the force of event for him. This careful housekeeping on the author’s part, coupled with the elegant stream of ideas produces the smoothness of a knife cutting through butter. Perhaps you would prefer to be thrown about in your seat more, or challenged by the gay causes this book undoubtedly espouses, but if not, prepare to read the first great work of 1988."

Kirkus Reviews gave the book a negative review, giving "praise for restraint, especially for the less lyrical style--but, all in all, these scraps are nothing new."

== Legacy ==
In a retrospective review, critic Mike Cormack said that "It is this underlying convergence – the way sensual detail and symbolic imagery all express the same conflict between being and nothingness – that makes Edmund White, at his best, a novelist of the highest order. Like Forster, he is concerned with the moral reality of personal relations; like Joyce, with the life of consciousness itself; like Nabokov, with the sensuous reality of the moment, and its moral implications. Few postwar writers have attained such subtlety, let alone united thought and sensation with such assurance. The Beautiful Room Is Empty is far from being merely a landmark of gay writing: it is one of the peaks of postwar American literature. One reads it again and again, and each time the story seems to have grown larger, deeper, and more rewarding."
