= Uzodinma Iweala =

Nigerian-American writer

- Born: 5 November 1982 (age 43); Washington, D.C.
- Citizenship: United States, Nigeria
- Occupations: Writer, Sociologist, Physician, Filmmaker

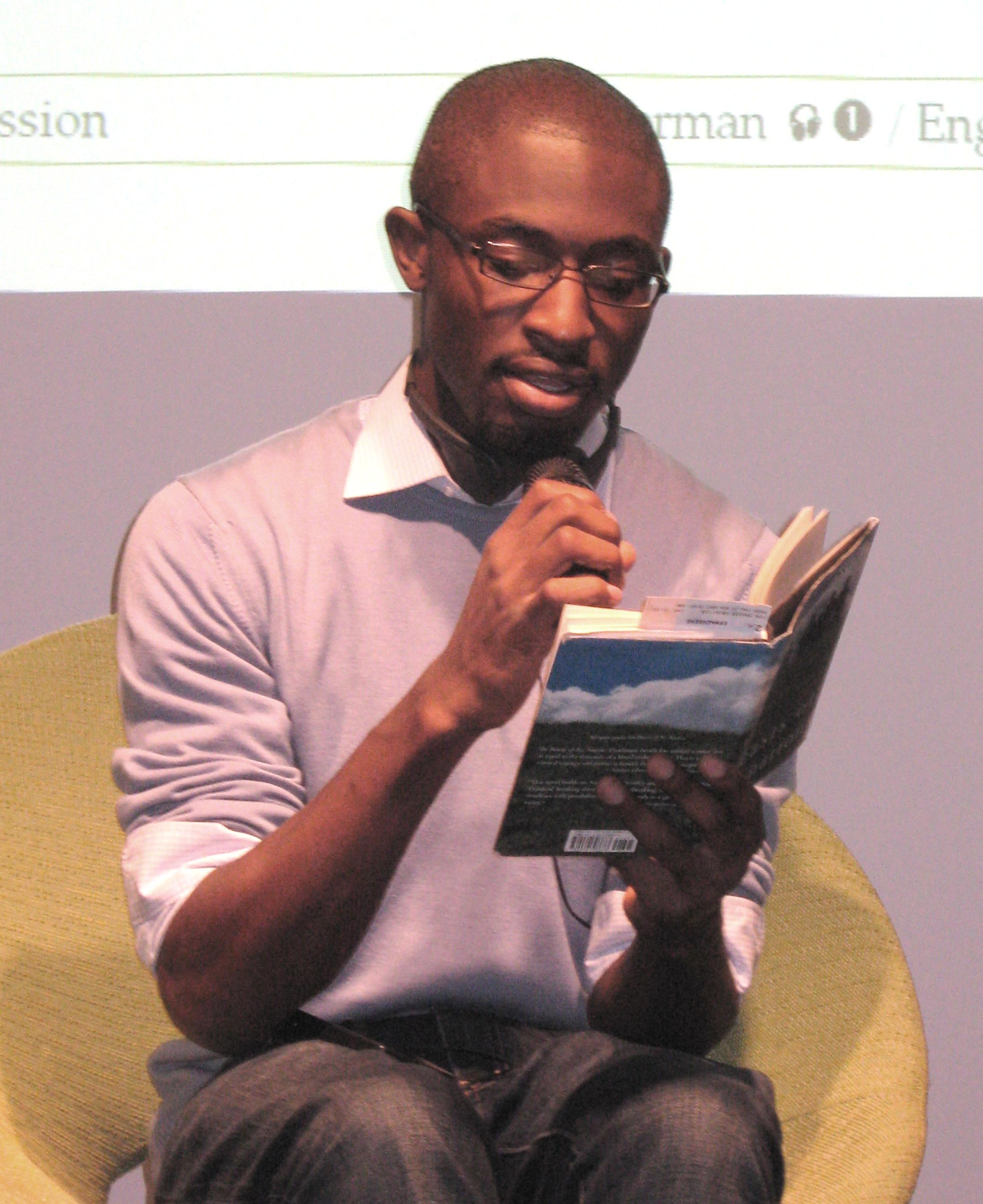
Uzodinma Iweala during a public reading at the Frankfurt Book Fair on October 17, 2008.

Uzodinma Iweala (born November 5, 1982) is a Nigerian-American author and medical doctor. His debut novel, Beasts of No Nation, is a formation of his thesis work (in creative writing) at Harvard. It depicts a child soldier in an unnamed African country. The book, published in 2005 and adapted as an award-winning film in 2015, was mentioned by Time Magazine, The New York Times, Entertainment Weekly, The Times, and Rolling Stone. In 2012, he released the non-fiction book Our Kind of People, about the HIV/AIDS epidemic in Nigeria. He later released a novel titled Speak No Evil, published in 2018, which highlights the life of a gay Nigerian-American boy named Niru.

Iweala is the former CEO of The Africa Center in Harlem, New York. He is currently a fellow at the Katë Hamburger Center for Apocalyptic and Post Apocalyptic Studies at the University of Heidelberg and a Council on Foreign Relations International Affairs Fellow and advisor at UNSECO.

== Family and education ==
Born and raised in the USA, Iweala is the son of Dr. Ngozi Okonjo-Iweala. He attended St. Albans School in Washington, D.C., and later Harvard College, from which he graduated with an A.B., magna cum laude, in English and American Literature and Language, in 2004. His roommate at Harvard was the future mayor of South Bend, Indiana and U.S. transportation secretary Pete Buttigieg. While at Harvard, Iweala earned the Hoopes Prize and Dorothy Hicks Lee Prize for Outstanding Undergraduate Thesis, 2004; Eager Prize for Best Undergraduate Short Story, 2003; and the Horman Prize for Excellence in Creative Writing, 2003. He graduated from Columbia University College of Physicians and Surgeons in 2011 and was a fellow at the Radcliffe Institute for Advanced Study at Harvard University.

== Novels ==
=== Beasts of No Nation (2005) ===
In his first novel, Iweala showcases the journey of a young child soldier named Agu during a war in an unnamed West African country. The book shows the terrible realities and experiences of war and Iweala does not shy away from explicit and visceral detail throughout the book. In 2015 a movie of the same name was released based on the book.

=== Speak No Evil (2018) ===
In his second novel, Iweala explores the intersections of race, class, gender, sexuality, nationality and the diaspora through the story of Niru, a Nigerian-American high-school senior living in a middle-class suburb of Washington, D.C., who comes out as gay to his white straight friend Meredith. The first two thirds of the book are narrated by Niru while the last third is narrated by Meredith. Niru must learn how to negotiate his many identities: being a Black man in America, being the child of Nigerian immigrants, coming from a middle-class background, as well as being gay. Niru is forced to confront the many ways in which he is privileged, as well as disenfranchised. Iweala also interweaves themes of religion, cultural dislocation, mental health, police brutality, and more, all of which further add to and further complicate Niru's life and identities.

== Literary awards ==
In 2006, Iweala won the New York Public Library's Young Lions Fiction Award. In 2007, he was named as one of Granta magazine's 20 best young American novelists.
