= Michael Lowenthal =

American novelist

- Lowenthal at Boston Book Festival in 2026
- Education: Dartmouth College (valedictorian, 1990)
- Occupation: Novelist
- Writing career
- Genre: Fiction
- Notable work: Charity Girl (2007)
- Notable awards: Jim Duggins Outstanding Mid-Career Novelists' Prize (2009)
- Website: michaellowenthal.com

Michael Lowenthal is an American writer and the author of four novels, including Charity Girl (2007) and The Paternity Test (2012). His short stories have appeared in literary journals and magazines including The Kenyon Review, Tin House, and Esquire. For more than twenty years he was a faculty member in the low-residency MFA program at Lesley University in Cambridge, Massachusetts.

== Education ==
Lowenthal grew up near Washington, D.C., a gay Jew from a family of Holocaust refugees.

In 1990, he graduated from Dartmouth College as valedictorian from a class of 987 students. During his speech, he revealed that he was Dartmouth's first openly gay valedictorian and he also, according to The Dartmouth Review, "disregarded the approved text and instead lambasted the College, his classmates, and the alumni. After the speech, many in the crowd credited Lowenthal with effectively ruining commencement." The New York Times, however, reported that Lowenthal's "classmates gave him a standing ovation," and quoted from his remarks:

Through need-blind admissions, coeducation and minority recruitment, our doors have been increasingly open. And today, Dartmouth is "integrated" in a new way, as I am its first openly gay valedictory speaker...[but such students] have too often been viewed as mere add-ons to the existing Dartmouth, rather than as equal participants whose presence necessitates a new, different community.

== Literary career ==
In Lowenthal's first novel, The Same Embrace (1998), identical twins Jacob and Jonathan battle themselves and one another to become individuals even as they are inextricably linked through genes, family, and history. The New York Times Book Review called it "an eloquent exploration of the nature of faith, the consequences of judgment and the stubborn endurance of family ties.”

In Lowenthal's novel Avoidance (2002), a 28-year-old man working at the camp where he spent an idyllic childhood summer becomes infatuated with a disturbed 14-year-old. The book explored the topics of child sexual abuse, hebephilia and pederasty, as well as social conventions and mores and ways in which they depend on environment and upbringing. It was nominated for a Lambda Literary Award in 2003.

In 2007, Lowenthal told The Boston Globe that he wrote his novel Charity Girl because, reading Susan Sontag's book AIDS and Its Metaphors, he was intrigued by a reference to the quarantining during WWI of American women diagnosed with venereal diseases. He discovered that 15,000 young women had been summarily sent to detention centers for the duration, and wrote his first historical novel about such a girl. Charity Girl was a New York Times Book Review "Editors’ Choice" and a Washington Post "Top Fiction of 2007" pick.

In The Paternity Test (2012), two gay men wanting a child enlist a surrogate mother. David Levithan in The Washington Post wrote, "Credit Lowenthal for taking what could have been a safe, sweet story and turning it into something knotted and barbed...It's a lesson both straights and gays would do well to heed: Just because you can have children doesn't mean you should."

== Fellowships and honors ==
Lowenthal has been the recipient of fellowships from the Bread Loaf and Wesleyan writers' conferences, the Massachusetts Cultural Council, the New Hampshire State Council on the Arts, and the Hawthornden International Retreat for Writers.

He was awarded the Jim Duggins Outstanding Mid-Career Novelists' Prize by the Saints and Sinners Literary Festival in 2009. In 2014/15 he was a Picador Guest Professor for Literature at the University of Leipzig's Institute for American Studies in Leipzig, Germany.

== Books ==
- The Same Embrace (novel, Dutton, 1998)
- Avoidance (novel, Graywolf Press, 2002)
- Charity Girl (novel, Houghton Mifflin, 2007)
- The Paternity Test (novel, University of Wisconsin Press, 2012)
- Sex with Strangers (short story collection, University of Wisconsin Pres, 2021)
- Place Envy: Essays in Search of Orientation (essays, University of Ohio Press, 2026)
