= 9th Lambda Literary Awards =

1997 literary awards ceremony

The 9th Lambda Literary Awards were held in 1997 to honour works of LGBT literature published in 1996.

== Special awards ==
Category	Winner
Editor's Choice	Donald Windham, Tennessee Williams’ Letters to Donald Windham, 1940-1965
Pioneer Award	Helaine Harris, Daedalus Books
Publishers Service Award	Norman Laurila, A Different Light

== Nominees and winners ==
9th Lambda Literary Awards winners and finalists
Category	Author/Editor	Title	Result
Anthologies (Fiction)	Joan Nestle and Naomi Holoch (eds.)	Women on Women 3	Winner
Anthologies (Fiction)	David Bergman (ed.)	Men on Men 6	Finalist
Anthologies (Fiction)	Victoria Brownworth	Night Bites	Finalist
Anthologies (Fiction)	Bruce Morrow and Charles H. Rowell (eds.)	Shade	Finalist
Anthologies (Fiction)	Shawn Stewart Ruff (ed.)	Go the Way Your Blood Beats	Finalist
Anthologies (Nonfiction Fiction)	Michael Bronski (ed.)	Taking Liberties: Gay Men's Essays on Politics, Culture, & Sex	Winner
Anthologies (Nonfiction Fiction)	Bruce Bawer (ed.)	Beyond Queer	Finalist
Anthologies (Nonfiction Fiction)	Robin Bernstein and Seth Clark Silberman (eds.)	Generation Q	Finalist
Anthologies (Nonfiction Fiction)	Lee Lynch and Akia Woods (eds.)	Off the Rag	Finalist
Anthologies (Nonfiction Fiction)	Patrick Merla (ed.)	Boys Like Us	Finalist
Children's and Young Adult	Nancy Garden	Good Moon Rising	Winner
Children's and Young Adult	Earl Alexander, Sheila Rudin, and Pam Sejkora	My Dad Has HIV	Finalist
Children's and Young Adult	Ellen Bass and Kate Kaufman	Free Your Mind	Finalist
Children's and Young Adult	Michael Thomas Ford	The World Out There	Finalist
Children's and Young Adult	Michael Willhoite	Daddy’s Wedding	Finalist
Drama	Sue-Ellen Case	Split Britches	Winner
Drama	Mart Crowley	Three Plays by Crowley	Finalist
Drama	Rosemary Keefe Curb	Amazon All-Stars	Finalist
Drama	Holly Hughes	Clit Notes	Finalist
Drama	Michael Kearns	Acting=Life	Finalist
Gay Biography and Autobiography	Fenton Johnson	Geography of the Heart	Winner
Gay Biography and Autobiography	Bernard Cooper	Truth Serum	Finalist
Gay Biography and Autobiography	Mark Doty	Heaven’s Coast	Finalist
Gay Biography and Autobiography	David Hajdu	Lush Life: A Biography of Billy Strayhorn	Finalist
Gay Biography and Autobiography	Assotto Saint	Spells of a Voodoo Doll	Finalist
Gay Fiction	Shyam Selvadurai	Funny Boy	Winner
Gay Fiction	Michael Arditti	Pagan’s Father	Finalist
Gay Fiction	Andrew Holleran	The Beauty of Men	Finalist
Gay Fiction	Patrick Moore	Iowa	Finalist
Gay Fiction	Dale Peck	The Law of Enclosures	Finalist
Lambda Literary Award for Gay Mystery	Michael Nava	The Death of Friends	Winner
Lambda Literary Award for Gay Mystery	Grant Michaels	Time to Check Out	Finalist
Lambda Literary Award for Gay Mystery	Steven Saylor	Murder on the Appian Way	Finalist
Lambda Literary Award for Gay Mystery	John Morgan Wilson	Simple Justice	Finalist
Lambda Literary Award for Gay Mystery	R. D. Zimmerman	Tribe	Finalist
Gay Poetry	Rafael Campo	What the Body Told	Winner
Gay Poetry	Kenny Fries	Anesthesia	Finalist
Gay Poetry	Michael Lassell	Eros in Boystown	Finalist
Gay Poetry	Jaime Manrique	My Night With Federico Garcia Lorca	Finalist
Gay Poetry	Reginald Shepherd	Angel, Interrupted	Finalist
Gay Studies	Patrick Merla (ed.)	Boys Like Us	Winner
Gay Studies	Keith Boykin	One More River to Cross	Finalist
Gay Studies	Will Fellows	Farm Boys	Finalist
Gay Studies	Harry Hay and Will Roscoe	Radically Gay	Finalist
Gay Studies	David Tuller	Cracks in the Iron Closet	Finalist
Humor	Judy Carter	The Homo Handbook	Winner
Humor	Tim Barela	Kurt Cobain & Mozart Are Both Dead	Finalist
Humor	Mary Dugger	History of Lesbian Hair	Finalist
Humor	Helen Eisenbach	Lesbianism Made Easy	Finalist
Humor	Liz Tracey and Sydney Pokorny	So You Want to Be a Lesbian?	Finalist
Lesbian Memoir or Biography	Doris Grumbach	Life in a Day	Winner
Lesbian Memoir or Biography	Candace Gingrich	Accidental Activist	Finalist
Lesbian Memoir or Biography	Honor Moore	The White Blackbird	Finalist
Lesbian Memoir or Biography	Torie Osborn	Coming Home to America	Finalist
Lesbian Memoir or Biography	Helen Sheehy	Eva Le Gallienne	Finalist
Lesbian Fiction	Achy Obejas	Memory Mambo	Winner
Lesbian Fiction	Carol Anshaw	Seven Moves	Finalist
Lesbian Fiction	Rebecca Brown	What Keeps Me Here	Finalist
Lesbian Fiction	Sarah Van Arsdale	Toward Amnesia	Finalist
Lesbian Fiction	Barbara Wilson	If You Had a Family	Finalist
Lesbian Mystery	Ellen Hart	Robber's Wine	Winner
Lesbian Mystery	Katherine V. Forrest	Liberty Square	Finalist
Lesbian Mystery	Jaye Maiman	Baby, It’s Cold	Finalist
Lesbian Mystery	Jackie Manthorne	Final Take	Finalist
Lesbian Mystery	Claire McNab	Inner Circle	Finalist
Lesbian Poetry	Robin Becker	All-American Girl	Winner
Lesbian Poetry	Maureen Seaton	Furious Cooking	Winner
Lesbian Poetry	Clare Coss	Arc of Love	Finalist
Lesbian Poetry	Jeredith Merrin	Shift	Finalist
Lesbian Poetry	Linda Smukler	Home in Three Days. Don’t Wash.	Finalist
Lesbian Studies	Bernadette J. Brooten	Love Between Women	Winner
Lesbian Studies	Victoria Brownworth	Too Queer	Finalist
Lesbian Studies	Meg Daly	Surface Tension	Finalist
Lesbian Studies	Lindsay Van Gelder and Pamela Brandt	Girls Next Door	Finalist
Lesbian Studies	Ruth Vanita	Sappho and the Virgin Mary	Finalist
Photography and Visual Arts	Susie Bright and Jill Posener	Nothing But the Girl	Winner
Photography and Visual Arts	Persimmon Blackbridge	Sunnybrook	Finalist
Photography and Visual Arts	Loren Cameron	Body Alchemy: Transsexual Portraits	Finalist
Photography and Visual Arts	Derek Jarman	Derek Jarman’s Garden	Finalist
Photography and Visual Arts	Susan Stryker and Jim Van Buskirk	Gay by the Bay	Finalist
Science fiction, fantasy or horror	Clive Barker	Sacrament	Winner
Science fiction, fantasy or horror	Eric Garber and Jewelle Gomez	Swords of the Rainbow	Finalist
Science fiction, fantasy or horror	Pam Keesey	Women Who Run With Werewolves	Finalist
Science fiction, fantasy or horror	Rachel Pollack	Godmother Night	Finalist
Science fiction, fantasy or horror	Michael Rowe and Thomas S. Roche	Sons of Darkness	Finalist
Small Press	Loren Cameron	Body Alchemy: Transsexual Portraits	Winner
Small Press	Victoria Brownworth	Too Queer	Finalist
Small Press	Diamanda Galas	Shit of God	Finalist
Small Press	Bernard Welt	Mythomania	Finalist
Small Press	Celeste West	Lesbian Polyfidelity	Finalist
Spirituality	Peter Gomes	The Good Book	Winner
Spirituality	Marc Adams	The Preacher’s Son	Finalist
Spirituality	Marilyn Alexander and James Preston	We Were Baptized Too	Finalist
Spirituality	Keith Hartman	Congregations in Conflict	Finalist
Spirituality	Lev Raphael	Journeys & Arrivals	Finalist
Transgender	Loren Cameron	Body Alchemy: Transsexual Portraits	Winner
Transgender	Phyllis Burke	Gender Shock: Exploding the Myths of Male and Female	Finalist
Transgender	Catalina de Erauso	Lieutenant Nun	Finalist
Transgender	Leslie Feinberg	Transgender Warriors	Finalist
Transgender	Leon E. Pettiway	Honey, Honey Miss Thang	Finalist
