= Nat Zilkha =

American music industry executive and entrepreneur

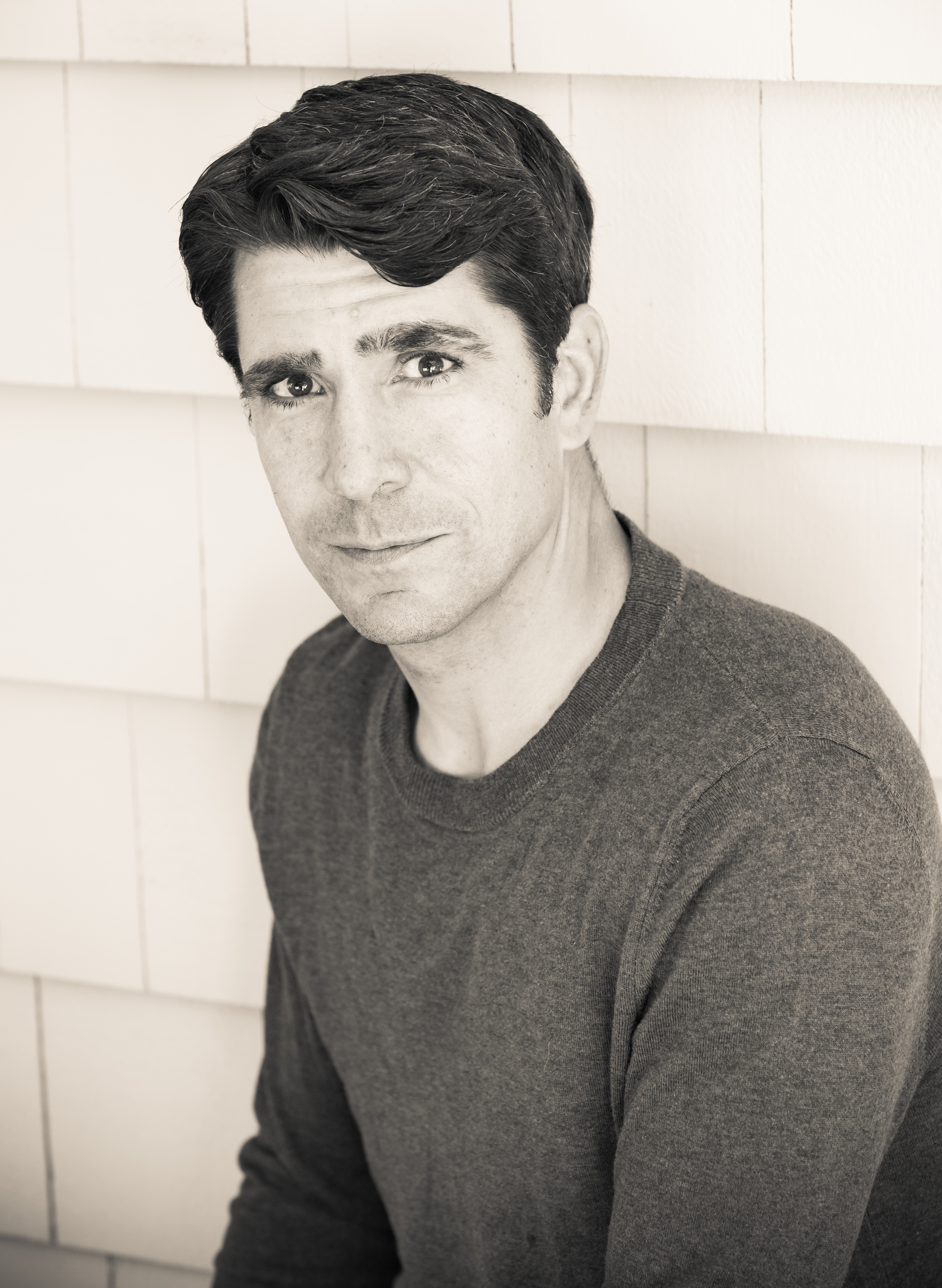
- Born: Nathaniel Zilkha; 1975 (age 50–51)
- Education: Princeton University
- Title: Chairman, Gibson; Co-founder and executive chairman, Firebird Music Holdings
- Board member of: Save the Music Foundation Apollo Theater
- Relatives: Abdullah Zilkha (grandfather); Khedouri Zilkha (great-grandfather); Ezra Zilkha (great uncle); Selim Zilkha (great uncle)
- Awards: Billboard Power 100 (2024, 2025,2026)

Nathaniel (“Nat”) Zilkha (born 1975) is an American businessman. He is the co-founder and executive chairman of Firebird Music Holdings and the chairman of Gibson.

== Early life and education ==
Zilkha was born in New York and raised in Portland, Maine. He graduated from Princeton University in 1999 with an AB in politics.

== Career ==
=== Red Rooster, Goldman Sachs ===
In 1998, Zilkha—a guitarist since grade school—founded Red Rooster with Jay Erickson, a Princeton classmate and childhood friend. Their first gig was at an open mic night in New York.

Red Rooster, initially a folk group playing at venues like the Back Fence and other small bars in down town NYC, became an eight-piece jam band that merged folk with blues, alt-country, indie rock, jazz, and electronica. Eventually, Erickson and Zilkha co-wrote the band's songs; Zilkha played lead guitar and dobro. At most live shows, the Red Rooster lineup featured a revolving crew of additional performers, including deejays, horn players, and, on at least one occasion, a full choir.

Red Rooster released three albums: Porch Songs (2002), Dose (2005), and Walk (2009). They toured throughout the US and in 2008 performed at the Newport Folk Festival. Zilkha left the band in 2009 to focus on his career in finance, which began a decade earlier at Goldman Sachs.

=== KKR, Gibson, music industry investments ===
Zilkha was promoted to vice president at Goldman Sachs in 2006 and joined KKR in 2007. In 2010, he was appointed head of the company's asset management arm and global special situations businesses, including distressed debt and rescue financing. In 2013 -- by then a partner -- he became head of KKR Credit, KKR's global credit investing arm. He also oversaw KKR's public equity and music industry investments.

In 2018, KKR acquired a majority stake in Gibson Brands, which was then in bankruptcy; serving as chairman of Gibson's board, Zilkha oversaw a reorganization that returned the company to solvency. In an interview with Bloomberg, he said as a guitarist he felt that "bringing Gibson back to what it was supposed to be was almost a responsibility."

Zilkha actively pursued investments in music intellectual property at KKR. In 2021, KKR launched Chord Music, a music rights-focused investment fund ultimately sold to Universal Music; completed the $1.1 bn acquisition of Kobalt song rights; and oversaw the creation of a $1bn partnership with BMG to jointly acquire music copyrights. Zilkha also led a negotiation that brought KKR a majority stake in Ryan Tedder's catalog, which included songs recorded by OneRepublic, Beyoncé, and Adele. Catalogs by artists including John Legend and ZZ Top were also acquired.

== Firebird Music Holdings, TVG Hospitality ==
In 2021, Zilkha transitioned to senior advisor at KKR and left the company to start Firebird Music with his college friend, former Ticketmaster CEO Nathan Hubbard. A multi-sector platform, Zilkha said in a June 2023 interview with Billboard that he and Hubbard were responding to changes in the music industry by creating partnerships that allowed artists to achieve greater independence and operate their businesses more holistically.

With access to $1bn in capital, Firebird has invested in, acquired, founded, or partnered with companies including Coran Capshaw's Red Light Management (which represents Dave Matthews Band, Chris Stapleton, Mumford & Sons, and Lainey Wilson, among others); Defected Records, Transgressive Records and Mick Management, who work with artists including Maggie Rogers and Leon Bridges. Firebird also created DamGood with social media-reality TV stars the D'Amelio family and launched Leo33, a country music label.

Separately, Zilkha led a $50 million funding round for TVG Hospitality, an owner and operator of music venues founded by Ben Lovett of Mumford & Sons.

== Boards and affiliations ==
Zilkha has served on the board of directors of several public and private companies, including Amedisys, Jazz Pharmaceuticals, Oriental Brewery, Harden Healthcare, and Cengage Learning. He also serves on the Save the Music Foundation and the Apollo Theater boards.
