= Zilkha (surname) =

Zilkha is a surname. Notable people with the surname include:

- Donald Zilkha (born 1951), American financier, son of Ezra
- Ezra Zilkha (1925–2019), American financier
- Khedouri Zilkha (1884–1956), Iraqi banker
- Maurice Zilkha (1918–1964), Iraqi banker
- Michael Zilkha (born 1954), British-born entrepreneur, son of Selim
- Selim Zilkha (1927–2022), Iraqi businessman
