= Daedalus Books =

Daedalus Books may refer to

- Daedalus Books (Ohio), bookstore established in 1980, based in Ohio, United States
- Daedalus Books (Virginia), bookstore established in 1975, based in Charlottesville, United States
- Dedalus Books, publisher established in 1983, based in England
- Dedalus Press, publisher established in 1985, based in Ireland
