= Abraham Udovitch =

American historian specialized in Islamic economic history

- Born: 31 May 1933 (age 92); Winnipeg, Manitoba
- Education: Columbia University; Yale University
- Occupation(s): university professor, Middle East historian, journal editor

Abraham Labe Udovitch (born 31 May 1933) is Khedouri A. Zilkha Professor of Jewish Civilization in the Near East, Emeritus, and Professor of Near Eastern Studies, Emeritus, both at Princeton University.

== Early life ==
Abraham Labe Udovitch was born in Winnipeg, Manitoba, Canada, in 1933. He received his B.S. from Columbia University in 1958 and his M.A. in 1959. He received his Ph.D. from Yale University in 1965.

== Career ==
Udovitch taught at Brandeis University and at Cornell University before joining Princeton University in 1968. He is Khedouri A. Zilkha Professor of Jewish Civilization, in the Near East, Emeritus, and Professor of Near Eastern Studies, Emeritus, both at Princeton. The former chair is funded by the Khedouri Zilkha Fund for the Study of the History of Jewish Civilization in the Near East established by Ezra Zilkha in memory of his father Khedouri Zilkha.

He is co-editor of the journal Studia Islamica and was associate editor of the Dictionary of the Middle Ages, prepared for the American Council of Learned Societies. Since 1978, he has been a member of the Executive Committee of the Encyclopaedia of Islam.

Udovitch is a member of the World Executive Committee of the International Center for Peace in the Middle East.

In 2010, Brill published Histories of the Middle East: Studies in Middle Eastern society, economy and law in honor of A.L. Udovitch, edited by Roxani Eleni Margariti, Adam Sabra, and Petra M. Sijpesteijn.

== Selected publications ==
- Partnership and profit in medieval Islam. Princeton, 1970.
- The Middle East: Oil, conflict and hope. Lexington, 1976. (Editor)
- The Islamic middle east, 700-1900: Studies in economic and social history. Princeton, 1981. (Editor)
- The last Arab Jews: The communities of Jerba, Tunisia. New York, 1984. (Editor with Lucette Valensi)
- The Islamic world from classical to modern times: Essays in honor of Bernard Lewis. Princeton, 1988. (Editor)
