= Daedalus (disambiguation) =

Daedalus was a figure in Greek mythology.

Daedalus, Daedelus, Daidalos or Dedale may also refer to:

== Literature ==
- Stephen Dedalus or Daedalus, the hero of James Joyce's A Portrait of the Artist as a Young Man and a character in Ulysses
- Daedalus (novel), a 2003 Star Trek: Enterprise novel
- Daedalus; or, Science and the Future, a book by J. B. S. Haldane, 1924

== Entertainment ==
- Daedalus (band), an Italian progressive metal band
- Daedelus (musician) (Alfred Weisberg-Roberts, born 1977), American musician and producer
- Daedalus (sculpture), public art work by Charles Ginnever
- Daedalus (Stargate), a spacecraft in Stargate SG-1
- "Daedalus" (Star Trek: Enterprise), an episode of the TV series
- Daedalus (Deus Ex character), in the video game
- Daedalus (fictional inventor), created by New Scientist columnist David E. H. Jones
- Dr. Daedalus, a scientist employed by Dr. Claw and the antagonist of "Did You Myth Me?", season 1, episode 48 of Inspector Gadget (1983)

== Science ==
- Daedalus (crater), on the far side of the Moon
- Daedalus (journal), of the American Academy of Arts and Sciences
- Daedalus (trace fossil)
- 1864 Daedalus, an asteroid
- Project Daedalus, an interstellar probe design

== Transportation ==
- Daedalus (yacht)
- HMS Daedalus, the name of several ships and shore establishments
- USS Daedalus (ARL-35), an American landing craft repair ship
- Daedalus, a merchant ship that took part in the Vancouver Expedition (1791–1795)
- Daedalus Flight Pack, a British jet pack
- MIT Daedalus, an American human-powered aircraft

== Other ==
- Daedalus (horse), winner of the 1794 Epsom Derby
- Daedalus Books (Ohio), an American book seller
- Daedalus Books (Virginia), an American book seller
- Daedalus Reef
- Daedalus (song), written by American band Thrice

== See also ==
- Dedalus (disambiguation)
- Daedalus Project (disambiguation)
