= Firebird Music =

American music holding company

Firebird Music Holdings
- Company type: Privately held company
- Industry: Music
- Founded: 2022
- Founder: Nat Zilkha and Nathan Hubbard
- Website: https://firebirdmusic.com/

Firebird Music Holdings, often referred to as Firebird Music, is a music company that includes data analytics offerings, record labels and talent management companies to provide career and brand guidance to musical artists.

== History ==
Firebird was founded in 2022, by KKR senior advisor and chairman of Gibson Brands, Nat Zilkha, and former Ticketmaster CEO, Nathan Hubbard. The company was created to provide data analytics, access to capital and traditional artist management to help musicians build their brands and maximize their revenues through recorded music, concerts and other live events, film and television, video games, apparel, beauty, food and beverage.

Since its launch, Firebird has invested several hundred million dollars in recording labels and music companies and maintains access to over $1 billion in capital. The company has acquired stakes in companies and labels, including Red Light Management, Mick Management, Transgressive Records, Defected Records, Tape Room, One Two Many Music, Ntertain, EasierSaid and Leo33. Through these stakes, Firebird's roster includes Mumford & Sons, Maggie Rogers, Chris Stapleton, Dave Matthews Band, Phish, and Leon Bridges, among others.

As of June 2024, the company investors include The Raine Group, KKR, and Goldman Sachs.

In June 2023, Firebird partnered with TikTok stars the D'Amelios, including Charli D'Amelio and her sister Dixie D'Amelio, to launch talent management company DamGood Mgmt. Firebird became the primary investor in the All Things Go Music Festival in 2024.
