= Stuart Ross (music industry) =

American music manager and festival producer

- Occupations: Artist manager; tour manager and director; festival and conference producer
- Years active: 1970-present
- Organizations: Co-founder, Event Safety Alliance; The Conference at Lilitz
- Awards: Personal Managers Hall of Fame (2025)

Stuart Ross is an American music and comedy talent manager and tour manager. He also produces and directs festivals and conferences.

Ross has managed, tour managed, and/or worked with artists including Puddles Pity Party; Eric Idle; George Michael; Metallica; Weezer, Matt Franco;Maynard Ferguson; The Church; Warren ZevonLeon Redbone, Journey, Heart, and Spinal Tap. He has represented Tom Waits since 1987. He roadied for artists including The Doors as a teenager and later did sound at the Agora Theatre and Ballroom in his hometown of Cleveland.

Ross was an originator of Lollapalooza and was its tour director from 1991 to 1997. For approximately 10 years, he oversaw touring and festivals at Red Light Management. He also was COO for Goldenvoice/AEG's festival division, where he produced festivals including Coachella and Stagecoach.

Ross taught courses on the concert industry at UCLA as an adjunct professor. He is a founding member of the Event Safety Alliance, and a co-founder of Live at Lititz, a 3-day conference for the "next generation in live-music production."
