= Michael Zilkha =

British entrepreneur (born 1954)

- Born: 1954 (age 71–72)
- Education: Lincoln College, Oxford
- Occupation: Entrepreneur
- Known for: Co-founder, ZE Records
- Spouses: Cristina Monet-Palaci (m. 1983; div. 1990): Cornelia "Nina" O'Leary
- Children: 1
- Parent(s): Selim Zilkha; Diane Bashi
- Relatives: Khedouri Zilkha (grandfather); Ezra Zilkha (uncle); Harold Lever, Baron Lever of Manchester (stepfather)

Michael Zilkha (born 1954) is a British-born entrepreneur, the co-founder of ZE Records.

== Early life ==
He was born in 1954, the son of Selim Zilkha, the founder of Mothercare, one of the UK's largest retail chains (and the grandson of Khedouri Zilkha, a Jewish banker) and Diane Bashi. His parents had divorced by 1962, when his mother married the British politician Harold Lever (later Harold Lever, Baron Lever of Manchester). He was educated at Westminster School and Lincoln College, Oxford.

== Career ==
In 1978, he co-founded ZE Records with Michel Esteban, which he co-owned until 1986. From 1986 to 1998, he was co-owner and executive vice president of Zilkha Energy, and from 1998 to 2005 president and co-owner of Zilkha Renewable Energy, until it was bought by Goldman Sachs in July 2005 and renamed Horizon Wind Energy, and co-owner of Zilkha Biomass Energy.

In 1998, Zilkha and his father sold the Houston-based Zilkha Energy to Sonat for $1 billion, which in turn was later acquired by El Paso Corporation, of which the Zilkhas became major shareholders.

In 2019, Zilkha inaugurated Ze Books, described as a new small press that will publish "literary mix-tapes from visionary writers, artists, and musicians". Inaugural authors included Glenn O'Brien, Jonathan Wells and Mary Gaitskill.

== Personal life ==
In 1983, Zilkha married the singer Cristina Monet-Palaci. They divorced in 1990.

He is married to Cornelia "Nina" O'Leary, a descendant of Hugh Roy Cullen, and they have a son.
