= Dedalus =

Dedalus may refer to:

- Dedalus (band), an Italian jazz-rock band
- Dedalus Books, a British publishing company
- Dedalus Diggle, a Harry Potter character
- Dedalus (medical software company), a provider of healthcare information systems
- Dedalus Poppy, a single seat ultralight aircraft
- Dedalus Press, a publisher of contemporary poetry in Ireland
- Dedalus-Preis für Neue Literatur, a German literary prize
- Stephen Dedalus, James Joyce's literary alter ego

== See also ==
- Daedalus (disambiguation)
- Daedelus (musician), American musician and producer
