= David Bergman =

David Bergman may refer to:

- David Bergman (journalist) (born 1965), British journalist based in Bangladesh
- David Bergman (American writer) (born 1950), American writer and English professor
- David Bergman (baseball) (born 1981), Dutch baseball player
