= Marina Rustow =

American historian

Marina Rustow is an American historian and the Khedouri A. Zilkha Professor of Jewish Civilization in the Near East at Princeton University. She is a 2015 MacArthur Fellow. Her work focuses on the study of Judeo-Arabic documents found in the Cairo geniza and the history of Jews in the Fatimid Caliphate.

== Education and career ==
A New York native, Rustow received a B.A. from Yale University in 1990, and two master's degrees from Columbia University in 1998 and 1999. She received a Ph.D. from Columbia in 2004, where she studied under Yosef Hayim Yerushalmi. She taught at Emory University from 2003 to 2010. In 2007, she was a fellow at the American Academy in Rome, where she developed an appreciation for Italian cuisine. She taught at Johns Hopkins University from 2010 to 2015, when she became a full professor at Princeton. In 2014, she won a Guggenheim Fellowship. She is a resident of New York City.

Rustow is currently the director of the Geniza Lab, an institute within Princeton University's Department of Near Eastern Studies devoted to the study of documentary sources from the Cairo Geniza. The Geniza Lab's work is largely within the digital humanities space, and includes under its auspices initiatives such as the Handwritten Text Recognition project and the Princeton Geniza Project database.

== MacArthur Fellowship ==
In its 2015 announcement, the MacArthur Foundation said that she had been given the US$625,000 prize for "deploying her considerable prowess in languages, social history, and papyrology", and that Rustow is "rewriting our understanding of medieval Jewish life and transforming the historical study of the Fatimid empire".

Rustow said that "The award is going to permit me to work in a way that I haven't really been able to work before," and "to dig a little bit deeper".

== Academic research ==
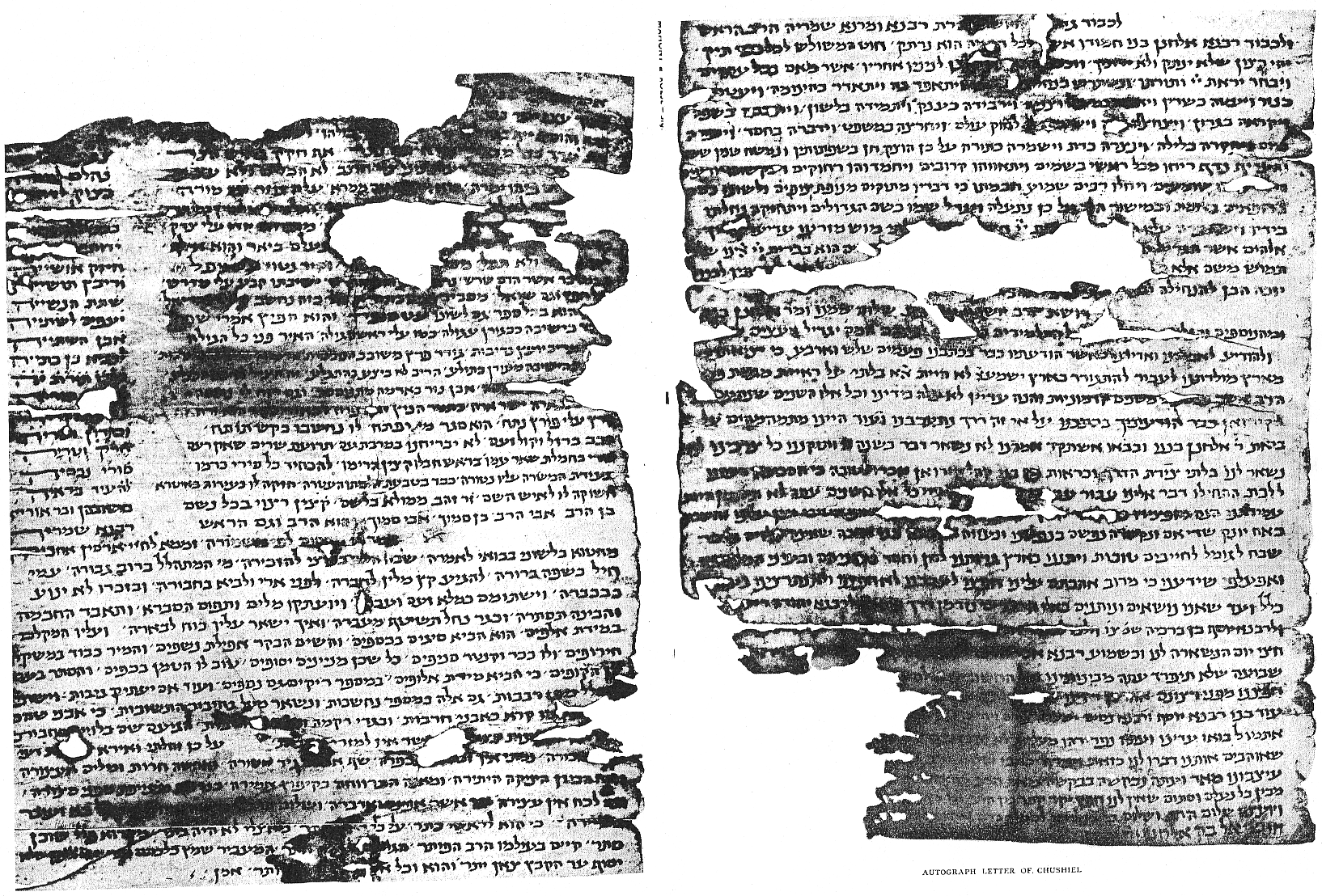
A 10th century C.E. letter by Chushiel ben Elchanan found in the Cairo geniza

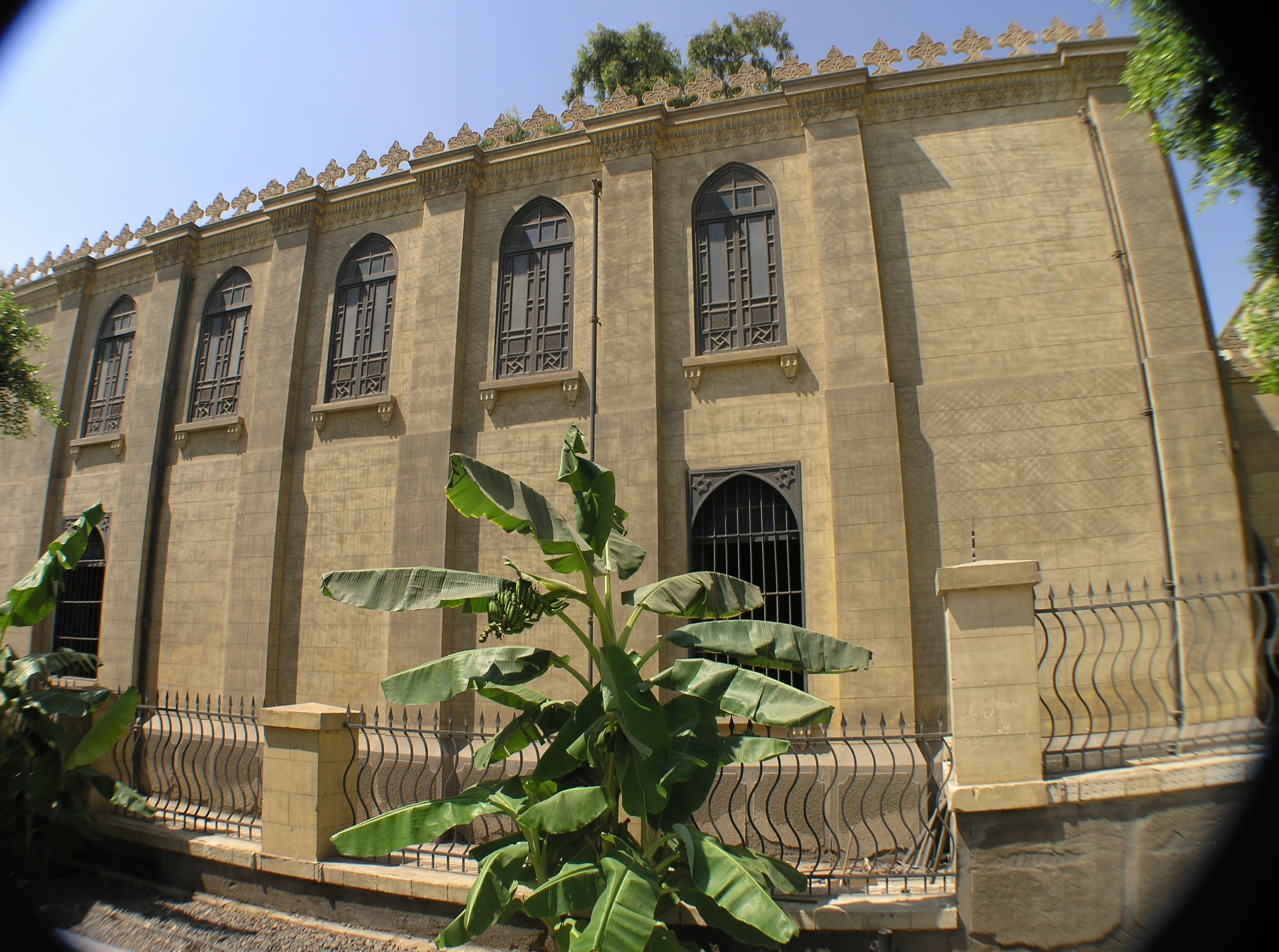
Ben Ezra Synagogue, original location of the Cairo geniza

In her 2008 book Heresy and the Politics of Community: The Jews of the Fatimid Caliphate, Rustow challenged conventional wisdom about the relationships between two rival Jewish communities living under the Fatimid Caliphate from 909 to 1171 C.E. They were the mainstream Rabbanites and the Karaites, who reject the authority of the Talmud and rely only on the Hebrew Bible. Most previous historians had described them as "factions bitterly divided by theological difference, the latter branded as heretics and marginalized." Rustow studied everyday documents that were part of a massive archive at the Ben Ezra Synagogue in Old Cairo. These documents, such as contracts, letters and government decrees and petitions, showed "a wealth of social, economic, and political transactions between the two groups". Her book calls into question "the depth of the religious schism, suggesting a higher level of tolerance and cooperation than had been assumed".

Previous scholars of documents found in the Cairo geniza had concentrated on texts written in Hebrew and Aramaic. Rustow chose to study those written in Arabic, which often appear "in the margins and on the backs of such documents." Her studies with colleagues have led to insights about the everyday lives of the Jews of Cairo, such as that they "imported sheep cheese from Sicily—it was deemed kosher—and filled containers at the bazaar with warm food in an early version of takeout." There was a triangular Mediterranean trade route between Egypt, Tunisia and Sicily in the 11th century, and flax used to make linen fabric, and soap, were the main commodities. "Everyone wore linen all the time," according to Rustow.

She is studying the usage of the Arabic language by the Jews of Sicily in years following the expulsion of Muslims·from Sicily in the 13th century C.E. The Muslims had previously ruled Sicily from the 9th century to the 11th century.

In collaboration with Sacha Stern, she has also done research on the Jewish calendar, focusing on the 10th century C.E. dispute between Jewish authorities Aaron ben Meïr and Saadia Gaon about the calendar.
