= Rockwell Church =

American folk-rock band

Rockwell Church is a folk-rock band composed of Joti Rockwell and Nathan Church Hubbard. After being nominated for seven Washington Area Music Awards and having a song placed on Aware Records's Aware 3 compilation, the band signed to Compass Records. The band toured nationally opening for Marc Cohn and Taj Mahal, and built a solid following playing the college circuit, including sold-out shows in Boston.

Joti Rockwell is currently a professor of music theory at Pomona College, while Nathan Church Hubbard is the Head of Commerce at Twitter, following his previous position as the CEO of Ticketmaster.

They still play occasional shows in the DC area and released some new recordings via Nathan's SoundCloud page in 2013.

== Discography ==
- Inches from the Ground (Homey Records, 1995)
- Through the Fall (Compass Records, 1997)
- Warm up the Gong (1998)
- Superego (2000)
- Antidote (Homey Records, 2003)
