= Daedalus Project =

Daedalus Project may refer to:

- Project Daedalus, a 1973–1978 uncrewed spacecraft project
- Daedalus Project (skydiving), a brand of high performance parachutes
- Daedalus Project, research into the psychology and sociology of MMORPGs by Nick Yee

== See also ==
- Daedalus (disambiguation)
