= Musictoday =

Entertainment marketing company

MusicToday is an entertainment marketing company located in Crozet, Virginia, near Charlottesville. The company sells presale concert tickets through fan clubs for different artists. It was founded and run by Coran Capshaw, the manager of the Dave Matthews Band and CEO of Red Light Management. Its first fan club was Dave Matthews Band's Warehouse Fan Association.

== Business model ==
Capshaw's business model is that of bands like the Grateful Dead and Phish, who ran mail-order presales of their concert tickets to their biggest fans. Most mail orders involved fans mailing in forms, money orders, and return postage in the event the order could not be filled. In 2005, Musictoday became the official in-arena merchandise vendor for Madison Square Garden. On August 1, 2006, it was announced that MusicToday was sold to major concert promoter Live Nation. MusicToday became a division of Live Nation subsidiary Ticketmaster until 2014, when the merchandise e-commerce division was sold to Delivery Agent, a multi-channel e-commerce provider focused on television. In 2017, founder Coran Capshaw re-acquired MusicToday following the bankruptcy of Delivery Agent.
