= Dewberry Hotel =

- The Dewberry in 2021
- Interactive map of the Dewberry Hotel area
- Former names: Landmark Hotel

General information
- Type: hotel
- Location: 201 E. Water St; Charlottesville, Virginia, U.S.
- Coordinates: 38.0301°N 78.4808°W
- Construction started: 2008

The Dewberry Hotel is the steel frame of an unfinished building in the Downtown Mall of Charlottesville, Virginia. The construction of the building began and ended in 2008. In 2009, a writer for the newspaper C-ville Weekly described the project as an abandoned tragedy being reclaimed by nature.

In August 2026, the Charlottesville city attorney described the building in the Code of Virginia's terms for urban decay and building abandonment, and demanded that owner John Dewberry describe what they intend to do with it.

== Description ==
The structure is an 11-story building frame in Charlottesville's Downtown Mall. There are no walls, but the bottom two floors are boarded up, and the nine floors above are exposed to nature. Previously, the Central Fidelity Bank was at the site, and its granite facade remains as the permanently closed entrance to the Dewberry. Neighbors have remarked on the overgrown space being home to rats. The City of Charlottesville has a structural assessment of the building from 2017, and as of 2026 is planning another one.

The original plan was for the building to be a boutique hotel with 101 rooms and a rooftop bar.

== History ==
In 2000, investor Lee Danielson purchased the Central Fidelity Bank for $1.8 million, with this being the site of the project. From 2000-2007, he and a mix of other investors bought and sold land around this site, with intent to develop it into a hotel. In 2007, Danielson partnered with another investor, Halsey Minor, and in March 2008, they did groundbreaking for the hotel, then called the Landmark Hotel. Construction proceeded until November 2008, at which time it ended due to lack of money. Construction officially ended in 2009 and has never restarted. The halting of construction included legal disputes between Danielson and Minor.

In 2012 John Dewberry purchased the building for $6.25 million, at which time the project was renamed to the Dewberry Hotel. In 2017, Dewberry proposed to expand the project into an even bigger hotel. In 2019, Dewberry proposed to convert the project into a residential apartment building.

In 2022, the building was the subject of a trademark legal case over the name "Dewberry".

In 2024 the buildings owners put the Dewberry up for sale.

== Reactions ==
One writer for C-Ville Weekly described the building as a tragedy, while another one said that it was holding the Charlottesville downtown mall hostage. Writers from The Cavalier Daily described it as an eyesore and a hazard. The Charlottesville city manager described the building as a scar.

The building was covered with graffiti in 2013, and people complained about it being ugly.
