= Somebody's Daughter (film) =

- Genre: Crime; Drama
- Written by: Lauren Currier
- Directed by: Joseph Sargent
- Starring: Nicollette Sheridan; Nick Mancuso; Elliott Gould
- Theme music composer: Charles Bernstein
- Country of origin: United States
- Original language: English

Production
- Executive producer: Karen Danaher-Dorr
- Producer: Joseph Sargent
- Cinematography: Kees Van Oostrum
- Editor: Wende Phifer Mate
- Running time: 96 minutes
- Production companies: Karen Danaher-Door Productions; Republic Television

Original release
- Network: ABC
- Release: September 20, 1992

Somebody's Daughter is a 1992 American crime drama television film starring Nicollette Sheridan, Nick Mancuso, Boyd Kestner, Michael Cavanaugh, Max Gail, Richard Lineback and Elliott Gould. It was directed by Joseph Sargent and written by Lauren Currier.

== Plot ==
Sara, a Hollywood dancer and stripper, finds herself repeatedly in danger after witnessing a murder.

== Cast ==
- Nicollette Sheridan as Sara
- Nick Mancuso as Noah Canaan
- Boyd Kestner as Toby
- Michael Cavanaugh as Aarons
- Max Gail as Harry
- Richard Lineback as Fielder
- Micole Mercurio as Mrs. Calder
- Elliott Gould as Hindeman
- Lenore Kasdorf as Sydney
- Don Matheson as Wilkie
- Lia Sargent as Dance Teacher
- Cameron as Crystal
