= Nathan Hubbard =

American business and music executive

- Education: Princeton University (BA); Stanford Graduate School of Business (MBA)
- Occupations: businessman; music executive; podcaster
- Relatives: Mark Hubbard (brother)

Nathan Hubbard is an American business and music executive, and the founder of Firebird, a music startup, and Rival, a ticketing startup that was acquired by Ticketmaster.

== Early life and education ==
Hubbard graduated summa cum laude from Princeton University in 1997, receiving a bachelor's degree in politics. Hubbard received an MBA from Stanford Graduate School of Business in 2004. He is the older brother of PGA Tour player Mark Hubbard.

== Career ==
Hubbard began his career in the entertainment industry as a touring and recording singer/songwriter with the group Rockwell Church. The band released five albums.

Hubbard served as CEO of Musictoday until 2006, when the company was merged with Live Nation Entertainment. Hubbard then joined Live Nation, where he was the CEO of Live Nation Ticketing. After Live Nation merged with Ticketmaster in 2010, Hubbard served as CEO of Ticketmaster at Live Nation Entertainment until 2013. Hubbard oversaw the e-commerce division of Live Nation, working on ticketing and online sales. During his time at Ticketmaster, Hubbard brought a "tech-focused and data-driven" strategy to the company and attempted to improve public perception of Ticketmaster. In 2013, Hubbard left Ticketmaster. Theories proposed for his departure included tensions with Michael Rapino, the CEO of Live Nation, over differences of opinion in product launch strategies, Ticketmaster's direction, and Hubbard's fan-friendly initiatives. While Hubbard was CEO, Ticketmaster started providing mobile tickets and launched a live analytics data service and a database marketing platform. From 2009 to 2013, Hubbard's term, Ticketmaster showed growth in ticket sales each year.

A few days after leaving Ticketmaster, Hubbard joined Twitter as the company's first vice president of commerce and the interim head of global media and commerce, where he remained from August 2013 to 2016. Hubbard was hired to work with retailers on making sales from their tweets through a "buy button." He left after Twitter disbanded its commerce team, stating that commuting from Los Angeles to San Francisco had been difficult for his family.

Following his time at Twitter, Hubbard founded ticketing company Rival in 2018 as challenger to Ticketmaster and served as the company's CEO. Rival had a contract with Kroenke Sports & Entertainment and teams from sports league in the US and the English Premier League and raised $33 million in investment from Andreessen Horowitz, Upfront Ventures, and payment company Stripe founders Patrick and John Collison. In July 2019, Ticketmaster began negotiations to acquire Rival and, in March 2020, the Department of Justice approved Ticketmaster's acquisition of Rival and Hubbard sold the company.

In 2022, Hubbard partnered with college roommate and chairman of Gibson Brands, Nat Zilkha, to start Firebird Music Holdings, a music company that provides career and brand guidance to artists. The company's investors include The Raine Group, Kohlberg Kravis Roberts and Goldman Sachs Asset Management and includes artists such as Maggie Rogers, Chris Stapleton, Mumford & Sons, Dave Matthews Band, Phish and Leon Bridges. In 2023, Firebird partnered with TikTok stars the D'Amelio's DamGood Mgmt.

Hubbard works for The Ringer, where he hosts the podcast Every Single Album alongside reporter Nora Princiotti, where the two discuss the discographies and business impact of musical artists. He also hosts a golf podcast called Fairway Rollin' with Joe House.

Hubbard is on the board for Gibson.
