= Cameron (actress) =

American actress and model

- Born: 1953 (age 72–73)
- Other names: Cameron Oppenheim, Bobby Cameron, Bobbi Venus, Roberta Jean Oppenheimer
- Occupations: Model, actress
- Notable work: The Holy Mountain; Star Trek: TNG
- Relatives: Marjorie Cameron (aunt) Loren Cameron (brother)
- Website: web.archive.org/web/20010413230313/http://home.earthlink.net/~cameronshow/index.html

Cameron (born 1953) is a mononym of Cameron Oppenheim, an American actress, model and The Cockettes member who was also known as Bobby/Bobbi Cameron/Venus, Cameron Oppenheimer and Roberta Jean Oppenheimer.

== Biography ==
Cameron was born in 1953. Her aunt was the occultist Marjorie Cameron, who also professionally used the mononym Cameron, and her brother, Loren Cameron, was a trans man who became a photographer.

Cameron was assigned male at birth. According to her later friend Judy Carne, she was kept from school at home due to gender nonconformity, until running away at age 16, circa 1969 (the year her mother died, and her brother Loren moved to their father to Dover, Arkansas). Carne also claimed to have taught adult Cameron literacy.

After moving to the city, young Cameron joined The Cockettes, an avant-garde drag theater group formed in San Francisco. She played in two movies of the group: a short Tricia’s Wedding, (1971), and Elevator Girls in Bondage (1972). In 1972 she was also the assistant and troupe member of Carne, causing a scandal when she replaced injured Carne as Sally Bowles and sang the part in a low register.

She was then scouted by Alejandro Jodorowsky to act in his 1973 The Holy Mountain as a factory girl seduced by Juan Ferrara's Fon.

After leaving the Cockettes, Cameron finished her surgical transition and lived stealth. She moved to Las Vegas, married a man, and became the leading Tropicana's Moulin Rouge showgirl.

In the 1990s she emerged as a Hollywood model and actress. Her most notable productions include Pulp Fiction, where she was one of the robbed patrons in the diner, and Star Trek: The Next Generation, where she had a frequently recurring background role of Ensign Kellogg.

In 2003 Cameron created the burlesque show "Cameron's Bump and Grind". She was the writer, producer, director, seamstress, set painter, carpenter and lead actress, with the other cast and crew members being her old friends, including The Next Generation alumni.

== Selected filmography ==
- Tricia's Wedding (1971, short): Patricia Nixon (credited as Miss Cameron)
- Elevator Girls in Bondage (1972): Cynthia Bandier (credited as Bobby Cameron)
- The Holy Mountain (1973): Fon's Working Girl (credited as Bobby Cameron)
- Columbo Cries Wolf (1990, TV film): Nymph
- Star Trek: The Next Generation (1990–1994, TV series): Ensign Kellogg / Cardassian Officer / Prytt Guard (uncredited)
- Samurai Cop (1991): Henchwoman
- Out for Justice (1991): Go Go Dancer
- Somebody's Daughter (1992, TV film): Crystal
- Sunset Strip (1992): Crystal
- Star Trek Generations (1994): Ensign Kellogg (uncredited)
- Galaxy Beat (1994, TV film): First Dispatcher
- Pulp Fiction (1994): Diner patron, stunt double (uncredited)
- Star Trek: First Contact (1996): Ensign Kellogg (uncredited)
- The Tomorrow Man (1996, TV film): Marta 7
- Star Trek: Voyager (1997, TV series): Command Division Officer / Holographic Klingon Warrioress (uncredited)
- Star Trek: The Experience: The Klingon Encounter (1998, short): Ensign Kellogg (uncredited)
