= Shawn Stewart Ruff =

American novelist and editor (born 1959)

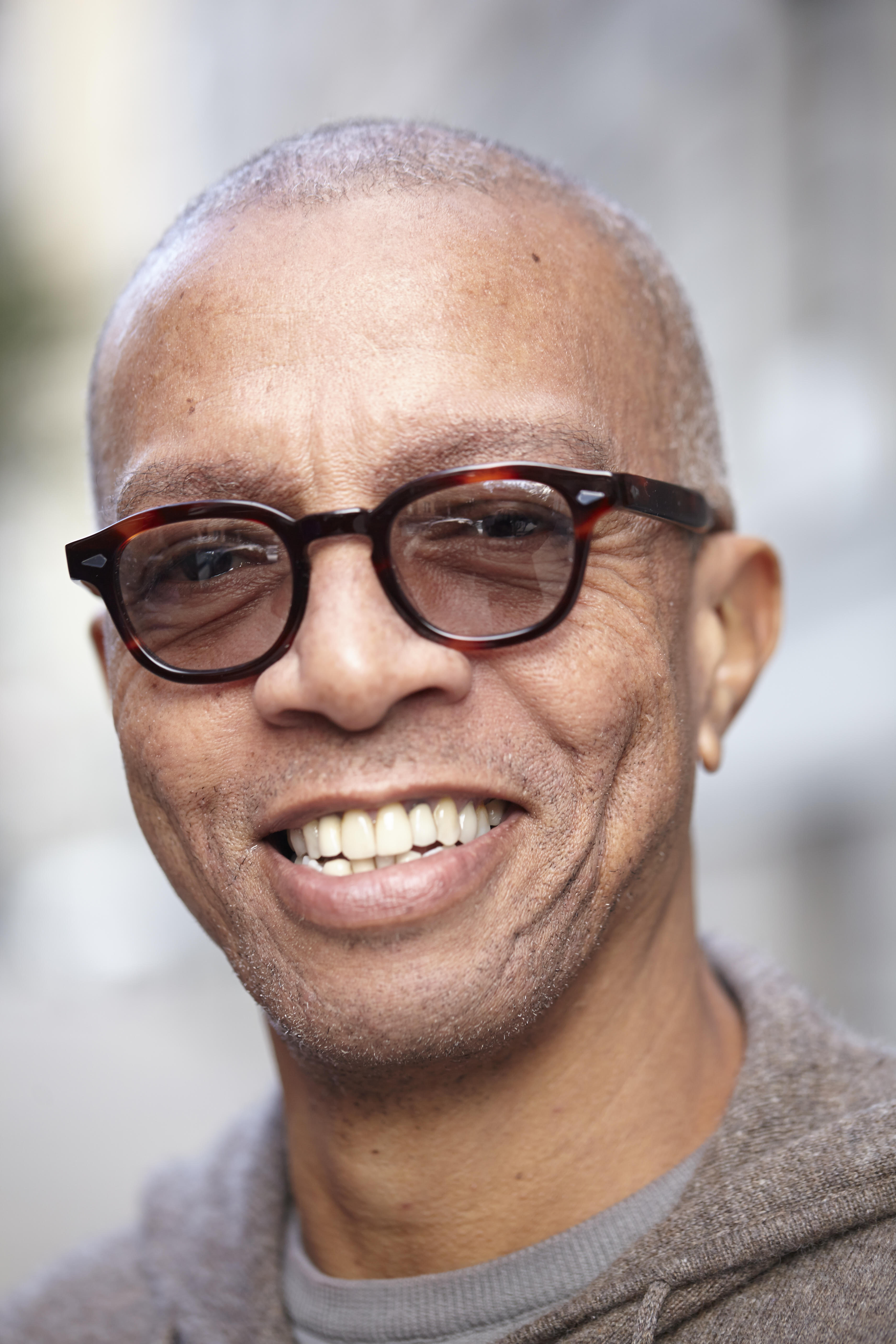
- Born: July 19, 1959 (age 67); Cincinnati, Ohio, U.S.
- Education: University of Cincinnati
- Occupations: Novelist, editor
- Writing career
- Period: 1990s-present
- Notable work: Finlater
- Notable awards: Lambda Literary Award for Debut Fiction, 2008
- Website: shawnstewartruff.com

Shawn Stewart Ruff (born July 19, 1959) is an American novelist and editor, who won the Lambda Literary Award for Gay Debut Fiction at the 21st Lambda Literary Awards in 2008 for his debut novel Finlater. He has since published the novels Toss and Whirl and Pass (2010) GJS II (2016), Days Running (2025), and the novella One/10th (2013).

He was previously editor of the anthology Go the Way Your Blood Beats: An Anthology of Lesbian and Gay Fiction by African-American Writers (1996), which was a shortlisted nominee for the Lambda Literary Award for Fiction Anthologies at the 9th Lambda Literary Awards in 1997.

A native of Cincinnati, Ohio, he studied English literature at the University of Cincinnati. He is currently based in New York City.

He is also an established beauty, fashion and lifestyle copywriter, having worked for brands as Chanel, Estee Lauder and Bergdorf Goodman.

== Works ==
=== Novels ===
- Finlater (Quote Editions, 2008) ISBN 978-0-9819420-1-8
- Toss and Whirl and Pass (Quote Editions, 2010) ISBN 978-0-9819420-5-6
- ONE/10TH (Quote Editions, 2013) ISBN 978-0-9819420-4-9
- GJS II (Quote Editions, 2016) ISBN 978-0-9819420-6-3
- Days Running (DOPAMINE/Semiotext(e), 2025) ISBN 978-1-6359022-3-5

=== Anthologies ===
- Go the Way Your Blood Beats: An Anthology of An Anthology of Lesbian and Gay Fiction by African-American Writers (Henry Holt, Owl Books, 1996) ISBN 978-0805044379
