= Donald Zilkha =

American financier and businessman (born 1951)

- Born: Donald Elias Zilkha; April 8, 1951 (age 75); New York City, US
- Education: Wesleyan University
- Occupation: financier
- Spouse(s): Valerie Kleinprintz (divorced); Ingrid Virginia Urrutia Soler
- Children: 3
- Parent(s): Ezra Zilkha; Cecile Iny
- Relatives: Khedouri Zilkha (grandfather)

Donald Elias Zilkha (born April 8, 1951) is an American financier and businessman. He was born in New York and was a graduate of Wesleyan University He founded Zilkha & Company (1987) and Zilkha Venture Partners (1999) and Zilkha Partners (2008).

== Early life ==
He is the son of Ezra Zilkha. The Zilkha family were bankers from the Middle East. The patriarch Khedouri Zilkha established the bank in 1899. The family was nationalized in three countries, from 1950 to 1956 (Iraq, Syria and Egypt) and had to rebuild in the US and Europe. Zilkha attended Lycee Francais de New York before attending high school at The Hill School. He entered Wesleyan University, where he graduated from the College of Social Studies in 1973.

== Career ==
Zilkha joined J.P. Morgan in 1973 and worked for the bank in positions of increasing responsibility in tax incentivized transactions, restructuring and mergers & acquisitions. In 1982, he joined James D. Wolfensohn & Company where he had responsibility in mergers & acquisitions and venture capital. In 1987, Zilkha formed his own investment advisory boutique, Zilkha & Company, focused on strategic development and mergers & acquisition transaction for blue chip Australian and European companies. By 1994, Zilkha assumed a principal role in the acquisition of Colt's Manufacturing Company, the historic American firearms manufacturer. The company had struggled in Chapter 11 for four years and Zilkha bought 95% of the business which he restructured over 19 years. Subsequently, Zilkha and his firm became involved in several other private equity transactions. In 1999, Zilkha established Zilkha Venture Partners. In 2001, Zilkha became associated with Yale's Sachem Ventures. In 2008, Zilkha formed Zilkha Partners L.P. which has a concentrated portfolio of investments in US publicly traded small capitalization companies.

Zilkha has been chairman of Colt’s Manufacturing Co LLC, and a director of Fluid-Screen, Inc and LV Investors LLC.

== Personal life ==
Zilkha is married to Ingrid Virginia Urrutia Soler and they have three children. His prior marriage to Valerie Kleinprintz ended in divorce (2003).

Zilkha is a trustee emeritus of Wesleyan University. He is a member of The Council on Foreign Relations and on the Business Council of the Metropolitan Museum of Art in New York

Zilkha is involved in various wine and food groups. He was Maitre of the Commanderie de Bordeaux (2012-2017), a founder of the Commanderie des Costes du Rhone (2008) and is responsible for Lex XXVI.
