= Coran Capshaw =

American music industry executive and entrepreneur

- Born: May 28, 1958 (age 68)
- Education: University of Virginia
- Occupation: Music industry executive
- Years active: 1991-present
- Known for: Founder of Red Light Management
- Spouse: Parke Capshaw (m. 2013)
- Website: redlightmanagement.com

Coran Capshaw is an American music industry executive, entrepreneur and founder of Red Light Management, a company that represents recording artists.

He is a band manager, a concert promoter, independent record label owner, merchandiser and real estate developer. The bands he manages include Dave Matthews Band, Phish, Chris Stapleton and The Strokes.

Capshaw's career in the music industry began in 1991 when he was the owner of the Trax nightclub, where he approved Dave Matthews Band's first successful weekly gig. Capshaw began managing the band in amphitheaters and stadiums.

== Red Light Management ==
Capshaw founded Red Light Management in 1991 while managing Dave Matthews Band in Charlottesville, Virginia. The company represents over 400 artists.

As of 2022, the company had over 70 managers and hundreds of support staff, with offices in Nashville, London, Los Angeles, Seattle, New York and Charlottesville. Red Light Management's annual ticket sales from acts is about $500 million.

== Musictoday ==
In 2000, Capshaw founded e-commerce company Musictoday to generate direct-to-fan e-commerce tools for the artists he managed to sell their merchandise, tickets, and other fan-related products directly to their audiences, bypassing traditional retail channels. By 2005 the company's roster had more than 500 clients and gross sales exceeding $100 million.

In 2006 Live Nation Entertainment acquired a minority stake in the company and eventually purchased the company outright.

In 2014, after making Musictoday's ticket-sales operation, Ticketstoday, a division of its Ticketmaster division, Live Nation sold the remainder of the company to Delivery Agent, an interactive-commerce company that specialized in digital transaction platforms for TV networks and sports partners. Delivery Agent filed for Chapter 11 bankruptcy in September 2016.

In 2017, Capshaw reacquired Musictoday. As of 2017 the company employed approximately 140 people.

== Concert venues and festivals ==
=== Starr Hill Presents ===
Capshaw founded Starr Hill Presents to promote live music on a regional and national level. The company has held an equity position in large-scale music festivals including Bonnaroo Music and Arts Festival, Outside Lands, Lollapalooza, South by Southwest, and Pilgrimage Music & Cultural Festival, Iron Blossom Festival and Railbird Festival.

==== Brooklyn Bowl ====
Brooklyn Bowl is a multi-city brand of music venues, bowling alleys and restaurants with locations in Brooklyn, NY, Nashville, TN, Las Vegas, NV and Philadelphia, PA. Capshaw became a partner in the company in 2017.

==== Allianz Amphitheater at Riverfront ====
Capshaw's Red Light Management developed a 7,500-capacity amphitheater in Richmond, Virginia through a partnership with Live Nation Entertainment. The $30 million venue held its first concert on June 7, 2025. The amphitheater welcomed nearly 200,000 fans across more than 30 shows during its inaugural 2025 season, which featured performances by Dave Matthews Band, Alison Krauss, and Mumford & Sons, among others.

=== Venues in Charlottesville, Virginia ===
==== Ting Pavilion ====
Ting Pavilion is a covered amphitheater located on Charlottesville's Downtown Mall. The venue was built in 2005, as a joint endeavor between the City of Charlottesville and Capshaw.

Ting Pavilion has hosted concerts by Earth Wind and Fire, Jack White, James Brown, Alabama Shakes, Alanis Morissette, Snoop Dogg, Loretta Lynn, Arcade Fire, Vampire Weekend, and Trey Anastasio among others. In addition to concerts, the Pavilion has hosted appearances by Barack Obama, the Dalai Lama, and Bruce Springsteen.

==== The Jefferson Theater ====
Capshaw owns The Jefferson Theater, a historic theater-turned concert venue on Charlottesville's Downtown Mall. The venue reopened on November 27, 2009, after a comprehensive restoration. Since re-opening, the venue has hosted performances from hundreds of artists including FUN., A$AP Rocky, Luke Bryan and St. Vincent.

The theater was built in 1912 and originally played host to silent movies, vaudeville acts and live performers, including Harry Houdini and The Three Stooges.

==== The Southern Cafe & Music Hall ====
Located on Charlottesville's Downtown Mall, The Southern Cafe & Music Hall is a music venue with a capacity of 300 people. The venue has hosted concerts by Maggie Rogers, Future Islands, Shakey Graves and ODESZA among others.

== Awards and philanthropy ==
Capshaw has won the Pollstar Magazine's "Manager of the Year" award seven times in 1998, 2003, 2010, 2018, 2019, 2025, 2026. He has been nominated for the award more than twenty times.

In 2011, Capshaw became the first artist manager to receive Billboard's Humanitarian Award in recognition of his commitment to local, national, and international community efforts and philanthropy.

In 2017, Capshaw was the recipient of the City of Hope Spirit of Life Award and helped to raise $4.8 million for cancer research.

In 2018, Capshaw along with Dave Matthews Band announced a $5 million donation toward the renovation and/or replacement of all of the city’s public housing and the construction of additional affordable housing on underutilized land. The Charlottesville Redevelopment and Housing Authority (CRHA) and the Public Housing Association of Residents (PHAR) are partnering with Red Light Management, the Bama Works Fund of Dave Matthews Band, Riverbend Development, Castle Development Partners and the Virginia Community Development Corporation to rebuild affordable homes in Charlottesville.

The group has raised a total of $25M towards a goal of $30M. This private philanthropy helps leverage federal, state and local funding to help build what will ultimately be approximately $200M worth of new, affordable housing.
