= Every Single Album =

Music and pop culture podcast

- Genre: pop culture, music

Cast and voices
- Hosted by: Nathan Hubbard and Nora Princiotti

Production
- Editing: Kaya McMullen

Publication
- Original release: March 7, 2021
- Provider: The Ringer

Every Single Album is a music and pop culture podcast hosted by Nathan Hubbard and Nora Princiotti and distributed by The Ringer. The podcast began by covering the discography of Taylor Swift in chronological order, but later moved on to cover other artists such as Adele, One Direction, and Miley Cyrus, as well as major events in the music industry. The podcast debuted on March 7, 2021.

== History ==
Nathan Hubbard and Nora Princiotti were both longtime fans of Taylor Swift prior to creating Every Single Album. Princiotti was in middle school when Swift's 2006 debut album was released, while Hubbard was working in the music industry as the CEO of Ticketmaster. Early in her journalism career, Princiotti worked at The Boston Globe, primarily covering the New England Patriots and occasionally writing articles about Swift. In 2019, Princiotti was listening to an episode of The Bill Simmons Podcast which featured Hubbard discussing Swift's music. Shortly thereafter, Princiotti left The Globe and began working at Bill Simmons' website, The Ringer. She was then introduced to Hubbard by Simmons after he discovered that they were both swifties. At the time, Hubbard was a contributing writer for The Ringer website, and Princiotti was a staff writer primarily covering the NFL. The two began discussing Swift's music via text, and later Simmons asked them to create a podcast covering Swift's albums in chronological order as well as the release of Swift's re-recordings. The first episode was released on March 7, 2021. At the time, Hubbard and Princiotti had never met in person.

After covering Swift's discography to-date, Princiotti and Hubbard briefly covered Olivia Rodrigo, since Swift was a major inspiration for Rodrigo's music. The duo then began covering the discography of Adele, releasing the first Adele episode on November 20, 2021. In 2022, the podcast covered the discography of the boy band One Direction as well as the solo albums of its members, releasing the first episode on April 1, 2022. Later in 2022, the podcast began covering The Eras Tour. In March 2024, the podcast had a series titled "Pop Girl Spring", which covered new releases from many pop artists, including Beyoncé, Dua Lipa, Billie Eilish, Ariana Grande, and Gracie Abrams. In April 2025, the podcast began covering the discography of Miley Cyrus, including the Hannah Montana discography. Cyrus appeared as a guest on an episode of the podcast, released on June 5, 2025.

== Reception ==
The podcast was well-received and has consistently ranked among Spotify's top music podcasts. On July 1, 2022, the podcast was ranked in the music commentary category as 32nd in the United States, 58th in Canada, 6th in Germany, and 36th in Mexico. In October 2023, the podcast was ranked 9th in the United States in Spotify's music category and 51st in Apple Podcasts in the United States. In Canada, the podcast was ranked 50th in the music category. On November 11, 2024, the podcast was ranked 49th on Spotify for music podcasts in the United States and 20th on Apple Podcasts for the music category in the United States. For music podcasts in other countries, the show was ranked 37th in Canada, 24th in Indonesia, and 55th in Israel. In the music commentary category, the podcast was ranked 3rd in the United States, 7th in Indonesia and Israel, 8th in Canada, and 10th in Austria. In May 2025, the podcast was ranked 13th on Spotify in the United States music category and 67th on Apple Podcasts. It was ranked 34th in the Spotify music category for the United Kingdom and 33rd in the Australia music category.

During The Eras Tour, Princiotti and Hubbard were often featured as Taylor Swift "experts" in news articles. As of May 2025, PodcastDb estimated Every Single Album had an audience of 10,575 listeners per episode.
