= The Homo Handbook =

1996 book by Judy Carter

The Homo Handbook: Getting in Touch with Your Inner Homo: A Survival Guide for Lesbians and Gay Men
- Author: Judy Carter
- Language: English
- Genre: Self help, non-fiction
- Publisher: Simon & Schuster
- Publication date: October 7, 1996
- Publication place: United States
- Media type: Print (hardback and paperback)
- ISBN: 0-68481-358-0
- Preceded by: Stand-up Comedy: The Book
- Followed by: The Comedy Bible

The Homo Handbook: Getting in Touch with Your Inner Homo: A Survival Guide for Lesbians and Gay Men was published in 1996 by Simon & Schuster's Fireside Books imprint. Written by comedian Judy Carter, the self-help book for the LGBTQ community won the Lambda Literary Award for Best Humor Book at the 9th Lambda Literary Awards. The book is a comedic guidebook that addresses issues such as coming out, dating, and dealing with discrimination.

== Composition ==
Carter divides the book into steps, one per chapter. These are intended to help someone come out, find others and deal with discrimination. The author discusses her experiences and then asks readers to reflect on them using a series of workshops and writing prompts.

- Buy This Book—What does coming out mean? What are the top excuses for not coming out?
- Come Out To Yourself—Internal aspects of dealing with homosexuality. It discusses fears, homophobia, and "don't ask, don't tell".
- Find Another Homo—The pros and cons of the bar and club scene, as well as how to write and respond to a personal ad.
- Get Laid—Best and worst pick-up lines as well as tips on how to break the ice, and tips on connecting with others.
- Get Intimate—Long term dating.
- Tell Your Straight Friends—Common excuses and reasons for not coming out with tips on when and how to come out. Offers comebacks to ignorant comments.
- Come Out To Your Family—Dealing with family, and top reasons to come out and not to come out to family members, as well as how and when to tell them.
- Come Out at Work—Coming out to bosses and co-workers. Employment rights.
- Become a Bigot Basher—Responding to homophobic comments and stereotypes.
- Become an Activist—Origins of the LGBT rights movement, and why it's important for someone who identifies as LGBTQ to be an activist.

== Publication ==
The Homo Handbook was published on October 7, 1996 by the Fireside division of Simon & Schuster.

== Controversy ==
In 2005, Fayetteville, Arkansas resident Laurie Taylor named the book in a complaint against the local school board, as one of 70 titles about homosexuality that were accessible in the system's libraries. Taylor accused the school library, school board, and others of promoting a "homosexual agenda".

== Critical reception ==
- 1996 Lambda Literary Award Best Humor Book
