= Jefferson Theater (Virginia) =

Theater and movie theater in Charlottesville, Virginia, United States

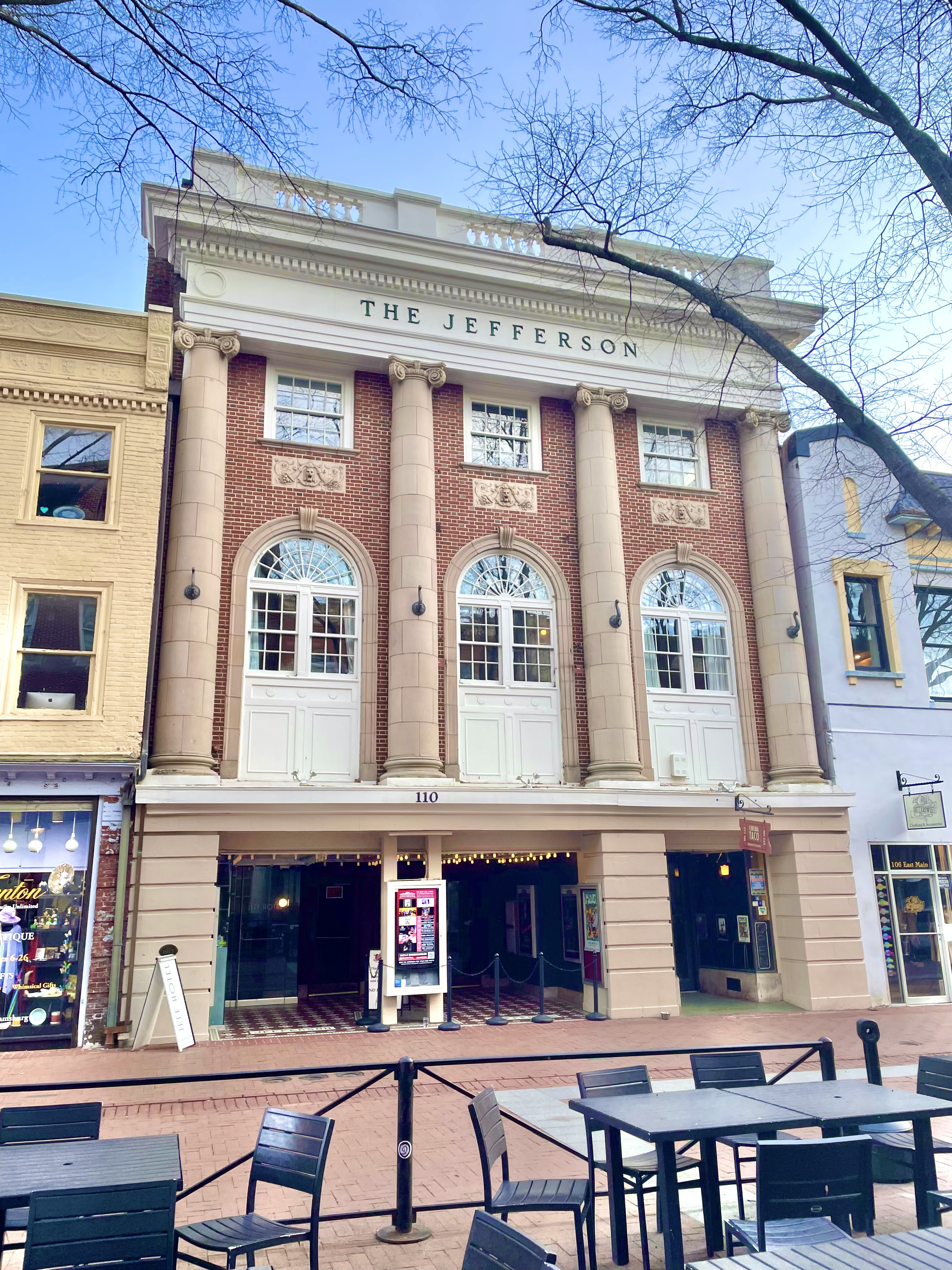
- Interactive map of Jefferson Theater
- Address: 110 East Main St. Charlottesville, Virginia; United States
- Coordinates: 38°1′50″N 78°28′52.5″W
- Owner: Starr Hill Presents
- Capacity: 750
- Type: Theater
- Current use: music venue

Construction
- Opened: 1912
- Reopened: 2009
- Architect: C.K. Howell

Tenant
- Starr Hill Presents

Website
- www.jeffersontheater.com

The Jefferson Theater, a former movie palace, is a performing arts venue located at 110 East Main Street in Charlottesville, Virginia, and is the centerpiece of the Historic Downtown Mall.

Built in 1912, this combination vaudeville house/cinema is one of the major performing venues in Charlottesville. Operated most recently as one of the dollar theaters, it is currently owned by Coran Capshaw, who oversaw restoration which commenced in the spring of 2006. The theater reopened in November 2009.

It was designed by architect C.K. Howell, who also designed the November Theatre in nearby Richmond, Virginia. It has a total capacity of 750 seats.
