= David Bergman (American writer) =

American writer and English professor

David Bergman (born 1950) is an American writer and English professor at Towson University, in Towson, Maryland part of the University System of Maryland. He was born in Fitchburg, Massachusetts, grew up in Laurelton, New York, and graduated from Kenyon College (1972) and earned a Ph.D. from Johns Hopkins University (1978).

He received the George Elliston Poetry Prize for his work Cracking the Code. With Karl Woelz, he won a Lambda Book Award for editing Men on Men 2000. He is openly gay and Jewish.

== Works ==
- " The Poetry of Disturbance: The Discomforts of Postwar American Poetry," University of Cambridge Press, 2015
- "You've Got to Hide it from the Kids" The Gay & Lesbian Review/Worldwide, 2013.
- Cracking the Code Ohio State University Press, 1985
- Heroic Measures Ohio State University Press, 1998
- Gaiety Transfigured: Gay Self-Representation in American Literature University of Wisconsin Press, 1991
- (ed.) Men on Men 2000: Best New Gay Fiction for the Millennium Plume, 2000
- (essay in) Queer 13: Lesbian And Gay Writers Recall Seventh Grade
- The Violet Hour: The Violet Quill and the Making of Gay Culture, Columbia University Press, 2004
- (ed.) Camp Grounds: Style and Homosexuality University of Massachusetts Press, 1993
- (ed.) The Burning Library: Essays (by Edmund White) Knopf, 1994
- (ed.) Reported Sightings: Art Chronicles 1957-87 (by John Ashbery) Knopf, 1989
- (Foreword in) Gay Fiction Speaks: Conversations with Gay Novelists
- (essay in) Boys Like Us: Gay Writers Tell Their Coming Out Stories, Patrick Merla (ed.) Avon, 1996
