= Lucette Valensi =

French historian née in Tunis (born 1936)

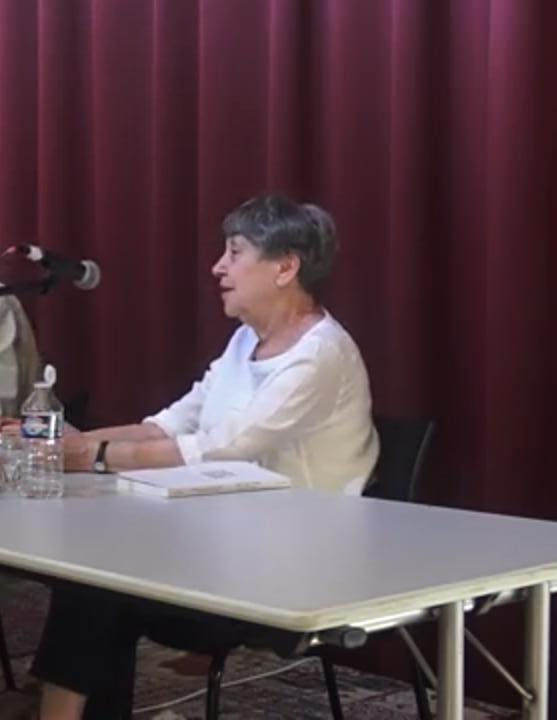

Lucette Valensi (born 1936) is a French historian née Lucette Chemla in Tunis.

== Biography ==
After obtaining her bachelor's degree in history from the Sorbonne in 1958, she became a history and geography agrégée in 1963 then docteur d'État in early modern period in 1974. She joined the French Communist Party for a while, then became involved in the anticolonialism that had moved her from support to the Algerian National Liberation Front to that of the Comité Vietnam national. She began her teaching and research career in Tunisia between 1960 and 1965. After this North African experience, she was successively maître de conférences at the Paris 8 University between 1969 and 1978, then Director of Studies at the École des hautes études en sciences sociales (Paris), where she directed the Centre de recherches historiques from 1992 to 1996 before creating and directing the Institut d'études de l'islam et des sociétés du monde musulman from 2000 to 2002. She also remains an associate member of the Centre de recherches historiques.

In February 1979, she was one of 34 signatories of the declaration written by Léon Poliakov and Pierre Vidal-Naquet to dismantle Robert Faurisson's negationist rhetoric.

She has a daughter, Jeanne, and two grandsons: Elie Ruderman and Gabriel Ruderman, also known as Edi Rudo, a magician and mime.

== Awards ==
- Chevalier of the Légion d'honneur
- Commandeur of the Ordre des Palmes académiques
- Officier of the Ordre tunisien du Mérite culturel.

== Publications ==
- Le Maghreb avant la prise d'Alger, Paris, Éditions Flammarion, 1969.
- Fellahs tunisiens: l'économie rurale et la vie des campagnes aux 18e et 19e siècles, Paris, Mouton, 1977.
- On the Eve of Colonialism: North Africa Before the French Conquest, London, Africa publications, 1982
- The Last Arab Jews. The communities of Djerba, Tunisia, Harmond Academic Publishers, 1984 ("The last Arab Jews"), translated under the title Juifs en terre d'Islam. Les communautés de Djerba, Éditions des Archives contemporaines, 1985, in collaboration with Abraham L. Udovitch.
- Mémoires Juives (with Nathan Wachtel), Paris, Éditions Gallimard, 1986
- Fables de la mémoire la glorieuse bataille des trois rois, Paris, Éditions du Seuil, 1992
- La Fuite en Égypte : Histoires d'Orient & d'Occident, Paris, Seuil, 2002
- L'Islam en dissidence, genèse d'un affrontement. Univers historique. Paris: éditions du Seuil. 2004. p. 236.
- L'Islam, l'islamisme et l'Occident : Genèse d'un affrontement (with Gabriel Martinez-Gros), Paris, Seuil, 2004
- Venise et la Sublime Porte : La naissance du despote, Hachette, 2005
- Mardochée Naggiar : Enquête sur un inconnu, Paris, Stock, 2008.
- Ces étrangers familiers, Paris, Payot, 2012
- Juifs et musulmans en Algérie, Paris, Tallandier, 2016
