= Meg Daly =

American evolutionary biologist

Marymegan Daly is an American evolutionary biologist and academic administrator who is the associate dean of undergraduate education at the Ohio State University College of Arts and Sciences. She is a professor in the department of evolution, ecology, and organismal biology.

== Life ==
Daly earned a B.S. (1995) and a Ph.D. (2000) from George Washington University.

Daly joined the Ohio State University College of Arts and Sciences in 2004 and is a professor in the department of evolution, ecology, and organismal biology. She specializes in animal systematics and ecology. On December 20, 2018, she became the associate dean of undergraduate education. In 2023, she was elected a fellow of the American Association for the Advancement of Science.
