= Gender Shock: Exploding the Myths of Male and Female =

1996 book by Phyllis Burke

- Author: Phyllis Burke
- Subject: Gender studies
- Publisher: Anchor Books
- Publication date: June 1, 1996
- ISBN: 978-0385477178

Gender Shock: Exploding the Myths of Male and Female is a nonfiction book written by Phyllis Burke and published in 1996 by Anchor Books.

== Background ==
After Burke adopted the son of her lesbian partner, she began to conduct research about gender and the relationship of gender role behavior and biologic sex. In 1993, she had published Family Values: Two Moms and Their Son, a memoir about the adoption process. Her own experience as a parent led to a research focus for Gender Shock on gender issues related to raising children.

== Synopsis ==
The book begins with a section titled Behavior that addresses treatments by psychologists and psychiatrists for what was then described as gender identity disorder by the DSM-IV. Treatments reviewed in the book include attempts at behavior modification, psychiatric medication, psychotherapy, and psychiatric hospitalization. The other sections of the book are titled Appearance, Science, and Gender Independence. In the Science section, the impact of physical differences is addressed. Based on her research, Burke asserted "gender is a social construct rather than a natural characteristic" and called for the elimination of the gender identity disorder diagnosis.

== Critical reception ==
In Psychiatric Services, Dr. Margery Sved describes the book as "a well-researched and well-documented study of the socialization along gender roles that children still experience in the United States in the 1990s" and states the book "should be read by any individual wondering about 'gender identity' and by any mental health professional treating 'gender identity disorder' or 'gender atypical behavior.'" According to psychotherapist and writer Wayne Scott in Harvard Gay & Lesbian Review, "Burke provides an exhaustive summary of psychological research on gender construction and the mistakes made in the guise of helping children." Kirkus Reviews says Burke "relies more on anecdote and example than on theory and sustained argument, thereby giving current discussions on gender a human face—and a wider audience" and describes the book as "Thought-provoking reading on the creation of gender identity for anyone who has a child or has ever been one."

In a review for The Los Angeles Times, Robert Dawidoff writes, "Public discourse is rife with calls to return to traditional family values" and "such groups as the Promise Keepers, the Nation of Islam and the Christian Right and such New Age gurus as Marianne Williamson and Robert Bly call for a return to a social order that consistently reflects an absolute biological distinction between male and female", and also states, "Burke's indispensable, smart and lucid Gender Shock presents a radically sensible alternative to these sexual reactionaries." A review in Library Journal recommends the book for academic and public libraries.
