= Judy Carter =

American comedian, magician, motivational speaker, and author

- Born: January, 3rd, 1950; Los Angeles, California, US
- Notable work: The Comedy Bible, The Homo Handbook, Stand-up Comedy: The Book, The Message of You, The New Comedy Bible
- Spouse: Gina Rubinstein

Comedy career
- Years active: 1980–present
- Medium: Stand-up, public speaking
- Genres: Motivational speaking, observational comedy, improvisational comedy
- Subjects: Humor, storytelling, stress reduction, self-help
- Website: www.JudyCarter.com

Judy Carter is an American comedian, magician, motivational speaker and author of five books on comedy and self-improvement.

== Career ==
=== Early life ===
Judy Carter was born in Los Angeles, California, the second daughter of Esther Silverman Carter, an entrepreneur and owner of a Beverly Hills dress boutique "My Flair Lady", and Sidney Alan Carter, a mechanical engineer for LA Water & Power.

Judy was born with a speech impediment and her older sister, Marsha, was born with serious health problems. In order to better communicate with her sister and to make her laugh, Judy, then eight years old, began checking books on magic tricks out of the public library and would purchase magic tricks from Joe Berg's Magic Store on Hollywood Blvd. The tricks came with a suggested patter. Carter attributes practicing the patter to helping her overcome her speech impediment.

=== Magica The Magician ===
While still in elementary school, Carter began performing at children's birthday parties as "Magica the Magician" with her assistant PG Rogow. She performed three or four shows a weekend and eventually added an accordion to her act. In September 1961, the Los Angeles Times profiled Carter and PG when their backyard benefit for Cedars-Sinai hospital raised over $500.

Carter continued performing her magic for birthday parties through high school, and then her parents paid for two years of college at Cal State Northridge. Judy continued performing magic acts at birthday parties and fraternity houses. She graduated with a BA in Theatrical Arts from the University of Southern California.

By this time, Carter was performing as "Judiwitch" and was invited to perform on a local television show which aired on KCET. After doing her act, she was asked by the interviewer if she experienced discrimination being a female magician. She joked that she was often asked, "to see your bottom deal." KCET refused to air the interview, and the controversy surrounding their decision made the CBS Evening News. As a result of the media attention, Carter was contacted by Gene Murrow, who invited her to run the theater and television department for the Harvard School for Boys.

In the early 1970s, Carter began performing at The Magic Castle in West Hollywood. There Ricky Jay and Johnny Thompson advised her to study sleight of hand with Dai Vernon. As a student of Vernon, Carter formed an act with mime Tina Lenert. The owner of the Magic Castle, Milt Larson, invited Carter to perform in the Close-Up Gallery at The Magic Castle. She was the first woman ever invited to do so.

Judy is divorced from Gina Rubinstein.

=== Comedy career ===
Carter switched to stand-up comedy in 1979. In 1984, Carter formed Comedy Workshop Productions, the first comedy classes ever offered in Los Angeles at Igby's Comedy Cabaret. In 1989, Carter started focusing on corporate events such as conventions and training for office-appropriate humor.

Carter has also produced the California Comedy Conference in Palm Springs.

=== Books ===
In 1989, Judy wrote Standup Comedy: The Book (Dell Books).

In 1996, she wrote The Homo Handbook, a comedic self-help guide for the LGBT community. The book won the 1997 Lambda Literary Award for best humor book.

In 2001, she wrote another book on stand-up comedy, The Comedy Bible (Simon & Schuster) The book describes different aspects of working as a stand-up comedian. In 2020, she wrote The New Comedy Bible that was put out by International Indies Publishing.

=== Motivational speaking ===
Carter also works as a motivational humorist and has held workshops for other comics to learn how to adapt their stand-up acts for a corporate audience. In 2013, she wrote The Message of You (St. Martin’s Press) about motivational speaking as a career.

She has also contributed to National Public Radio’s "All Things Considered" with a radio program that explored how comedy has changed over the years.

== Bibliography ==
- Stand-up Comedy: The Book (1989, Dell, ISBN 0-44050-243-8)
- The Homo Handbook (1996, Fireside), ISBN 0-68481-358-0)
- The Comedy Bible (2001, Touchstone, ISBN 0-74320-125-6)
- The Message of You (2013, St. Martin's Press, ISBN 1-25000-710-0)
