= Loren Cameron =

American photographer (1959–2022)

- Born: March 13, 1959; Pasadena, California, U.S.
- Died: November 18, 2022 (aged 63); Berkeley, California, U.S.
- Occupations: Photographer, author, visual artist
- Notable work: Body Alchemy
- Relatives: Marjorie Cameron (aunt) Cameron Oppenheim (sister)

Loren Rex Cameron (March 13, 1959 – November 18, 2022) was an American photographer, author and transgender activist. His work includes portraits and self-portraits consisting of transgender bodies, particularly trans men, in both clothed and nude form.

== Biography ==
Loren Rex Cameron was born in Pasadena, California, on March 13, 1959. His aunt was the occultist Marjorie Cameron, and one of his sisters, Cameron Oppenheim, became a model and actress known mononymously as Cameron.

In 1969, after his mother's death, he moved to Dover, Arkansas, where he lived as a self-described tomboy on his father's farm. By the age of 16, Cameron identified as a lesbian and encountered homophobia in the small town where he lived. At this time, Cameron quit school and left home to seek work as a construction worker and other blue collar employment.

In 1979, he moved to the San Francisco Bay Area where he identified socially with the lesbian community until the age of 26, when he confronted his dissatisfaction with his body and was excluded from the lesbian community. Cameron's interest in photography coincided with the beginning of his transition from female to male, which he documented photographically. In 1993, Cameron began studying the basics of photography and started photographing the transgender community. He gave lectures on his work at universities, educational conferences and art institutes. By 1995, Cameron's photographs had been shown in solo exhibitions in San Francisco, Minneapolis, and Los Angeles.

Cameron died by suicide at his home in Berkeley, California, on November 18, 2022, at the age of 63. He had been in poor health due to congestive heart failure and prior motorcycle accident, and his sister told The New York Times that he had become withdrawn from family and friends. His death was not publicly reported until February 2023.

== Photography ==
Critics praised Cameron's photographs as compelling and informative, while his work also drew backlash as being sexually explicit.

Cameron's work was first shown as part of a 1994 exhibit in San Francisco. His images have also been exhibited in Los Angeles, Minneapolis, in Santiago, Chile, Buenos Aires, Argentina, Sao Paulo, Brazil, and in Mexico City. They have been published in numerous books such as Constructing Masculinity: Discussions in Contemporary Culture and Leslie Feinberg's Transgender Warriors. He also posed for photographers such as Daniel Nicoletta and Howard Shatz.

In many of his self portraits, Cameron included the shutter-release bulb that he used to take the photograph. In a 2016 article, Cathy Hannabach said that his choice to work alone and feature the bulb serves as a commentary on the self-made aspect of being transsexual. Hannabach wrote that Cameron's photography invoked issues of queer bioethics, and was intended to remove the clinical view of transsexual bodies and redefine them as not in need of a cure.

His photography and writing was first published by Cleis Press in 1996. His first published works (Body Alchemy: Transsexual Portraits and Man Tool: The Nuts and Bolts of Female-to-Male Surgery) consist largely of self-portraits, and portraits of other female to male transsexuals. Body Alchemy documented Cameron's personal experience of transition from female to male, his life as a man, and the everyday lives of trans men he knew. The nude figures' poses in the artist's photography often portray moments of action and performance. Body Alchemy became a double 1996 Lambda Literary Award winner, and was described by The New York Times as "a revelation". It became his most well-known work.

Cameron lectured at universities across the United States, including Smith College, Harvard, Cornell, Brown, the University of California at Berkeley, Penn State, and the School of the Art Institute of Chicago. In 2012, The University of Minnesota-Duluth invited Loren Cameron to campus to present his photography. The University paid Cameron $4,000 from student services to cover his speaker's fee and travel expenses. This decision was met with a backlash, due to him and his subjects' identity as transsexual individuals, as well as the nudity in Cameron's work. Despite the objections, Cameron delivered his presentation on September 26, 2012.

In May 2008, Cameron presented his work at the Palais de Tokyo in Paris. He was profiled on the Discovery Health Channel's LGBT-themed special Sex Change: Him to Her, and on the National Geographic Channel's Taboo "Sexual Identity" series. He was also interviewed in The New Yorker magazine.

== Books ==
- Body Alchemy: Transsexual Portraits. 1996, Cleis Press. ISBN 978-1-57344-062-2.
- Cuerpos fotografiados por Cameron: fotografías. Volume 1. 2009, Taller Experimental Cuerpos Pintados. ISBN 978-9-56295-058-9.
- Cuerpos fotografiados por Cameron: fotografías. Volume 2. 2009, Taller Experimental Cuerpos Pintados. ISBN 978-9-56295-063-3.

== Awards and recognition ==
- Lambda Literary Award, Inaugural Transgender Category, 1997
- Lambda Literary Award, Small Press Category, 1997
- Lambda Literary Award Nominee, Best Photography Category, 1997
- 1997 FTM International Pride Award
