= Maurice Zilkha =

Iraqi banker

- Born: Maurice Khedouri Zilkha; 1918; Baghdad, Iraq
- Died: 1964 (aged 45–46); New York City, U.S.
- Citizenship: Italian
- Occupation: banker
- Spouse: Helene Paraskeviadias Zilkha
- Children: Doris and Philippe
- Parent: Khedouri Zilkha
- Relatives: Selim Zilkha (brother); Ezra Zilkha (brother); Abdullah Zilkha (brother)

Maurice K. Zilkha (1918-1964) was an Iraqi banker.

== Early life ==
Maurice Zilkha was born in Baghdad, Iraq, the son of Khedouri Zilkha and Louise (Bashi) Zilkha.

== Career ==
He was managing director of Banque Zilkha in Egypt until the family's Egyptian assets were confiscated in 1956 by Gamel Abdel Nasser's government.

In 1956, Zilkha left from Egypt and became an Italian citizen. He died in 1964 at the Carlyle Hotel in New York City after a short illness.

== Personal life ==
He was survived by his wife Helene Paraskeviadias Zilkha, their daughter Doris of Paris, France and Mont-sur-Rolle, Switzerland; their son, Philippe; as well as his three brothers and two sisters, Mrs. Helen Simon and Mrs. Hanina Shasha (wife of Alfred Aboud Shasha), both of New York.
