= Abdullah Zilkha =

Swiss investment banker (1913-2000)

- Born: Abdullah Khedouri Zilkha; 1913; Baghdad, Ottoman Empire (now Iraq)
- Died: 2000 (aged 86–87)
- Citizenship: Swiss
- Occupation: Banker
- Parent: Khedouri Zilkha
- Relatives: Selim Zilkha (brother); Ezra Zilkha (brother); Maurice Zilkha (brother)

Abdullah K. Zilkha (1913–2000) was a Swiss investment banker.

== Early life ==
Abdullah Zilkha was born in Baghdad, Ottoman Empire the son of Khedouri Zilkha and Louise (Bashi) Zilkha.

== Career ==
He was a member of the Zilkha Iraqi-Jewish banking family. Three of his seven siblings were also prominent in banking and finance: Selim Zilkha, Maurice Zilkha and Ezra Zilkha.

In the early 1970s, Zilkha's investment banking firm Ufitec, S.A., was a central player in the saving of the Penn Central from bankruptcy. At the direction of Lloyd Cutler, the Washington, D.C. attorney, Zilkha met with Donald Prell, an executive with Union Bank Corp., in Zürich in late December 1971, to facilitate gaining consent of all bondholders to a refinancing so the U.S. railroad's assets could be preserved.

== Personal life ==
He married Zmira (Mani) Zilkha, of the well-known Mani family of Hebron, great-granddaughter of the revered Kabbalist Rabbi Eliyahu Mani. She and her family survived the 1929 Hebron massacre. They had a son, Daniel A. Zilkha, born October 1, 1942, who became a New York City-based executive and philanthropist.
