= Body Alchemy =

1996 book by Loren Cameron

Body Alchemy: Transsexual Portraits
- Author: Loren Cameron
- Cover artist: Loren Cameron and Bernie Schimbke
- Language: English
- Genre: Autobiography, photography
- Publisher: Cleis Press
- Publication date: 1996
- Publication place: United States
- Pages: 110
- ISBN: 978-1-57344-062-2
- OCLC: 34850194
- Dewey Decimal: 305.3 20
- LC Class: HQ77.95.U6 C36 1996

Body Alchemy: Transsexual Portraits is a 1996 book collecting photographs and writing of Loren Cameron. It documents the process of transition and everyday lives of the author and other trans men.

== Background and production ==
Cameron emerged as a transgender photographer in the 1990s. He used photography to document his own transition and then expanded to photographing others. Early in his transition, Cameron sent self-portraits to friends and family members. He realized that this helped them understand his journey as a trans man, which made him want to photograph other trans people. He received public notice for his work: in 1994, for example, his photographs of transgender people were exhibited at a San Francisco gallery.

In many of the self-portraits, the shutter-release bulb is visible. Cameron used a shutter-release bulb because he typically worked alone. He did not attempt to conceal the bulb. In the introduction to Body Alchemy, Cameron explains that he sees the bulb as a metaphor: "I am creating my own image alone, an act that reflects the transsexual experience as well."

== Summary ==
Body Alchemy depicts transition and the everyday lives of transgender men through photographs. In the introduction, Loren Cameron describes his working-class upbringing, his passion for photography, and his transition.

The first half of the book is mostly full of self-portraits. The "Self-Portraits" section includes portraits of Cameron in a variety of poses and outfits: carrying a flag, breaking a glass bottle against a fence, holding a gun to his head. Each photograph is accompanied by a few paragraphs of Cameron's writing, typically either a relevant anecdote or reflection. "God's Will" contains photographs of a nude Cameron posing like a bodybuilder. In one photo, he injects testosterone into his buttock. In "Distortions," photographs of a shirtless Cameron are framed by transphobic statements. On these pages, Cameron's image is boxed in by phrases such as "My attraction to you doesn't mean I'm gay: You're really a woman" and "You must be some kind of freak".

In the second half of the book, Loren Cameron also includes the photographs and stories of other trans people. In "The New Man Series," Cameron photographs everyday transgender men. Each man also provides a short anecdote about his transition related to the picture. For example, a man named Matt Rice describes his experience working at a gay biker bar; he poses with a motorcycle for his photograph. The section "Our Bodies" depicts anonymous photographs of transgender men's genitalia and chests. Two subjects have undergone metoidoplasty, while a third has undergone phalloplasty. Another man photographed has not pursued bottom surgery; instead, he uses genital piercings to restructure his genitalia. This section also includes two photographs of men who have pursued top surgery with different surgical techniques. In "Fellas," Loren Cameron interviews his subjects about their jobs and hobbies. Men photographed include an electrician, a police officer, and a professor. The section "Emergence" also contains text from interviews with trans men. Each describes his transition and his sexuality. The text is paired with a photo of each man before and after his transition. The final section, "Duo," contains photos of Loren Cameron and Kayt, his partner at the time. Photographs are accompanied by statements from each person about gender, sexuality, and their relationship. In the book, Kayt describes herself as "FTM-identified" (Note: FTM stands for "female-to-male") and also as a member of the lesbian community.

== Reception and impact ==
Body Alchemy received generally positive reviews from LGBTQ and feminist journals. It was not widely reported in the mainstream press.

Body Alchemy received two Lambda Literary Awards in 1996. The Lambda Literary Awards, or "Lammys," are an American award for literary works about LGBTQ+ topics. Body Alchemy won the Small Press Award and the Transgender Award. It was also shortlisted for the Photography/Visual Arts Award.

Scholar Caio Jade Puosso Cardoso Gouveia Costa closely analyzed the nude self-portraits in the section "God's Will." In each photo, Cameron holds a different object—a syringe, a scalpel, and a dumbbell. Costa interprets these to represent hormone replacement therapy, gender-affirming surgery, and bodybuilding respectively. Each plays a key role in Cameron's transformation. He also compares transgender people to alchemists, who were also involved in processes of transformation and often lived outside the laws of society.

Historian Susan Stryker argued that Body Alchemy helped to make transgender men more visible in American culture during the 1990s. Author Kate Bornstein also credited Cameron with making transgender men more visible, no longer "relegated to the backseat of the transgender minority."

== Bibliography ==
- Cameron, Loren (1996). Body Alchemy: Transsexual Portraits. Cleis Press. ISBN 978-1-57344-062-2.
- Costa, Caio Jade Puosso Cardoso Gouveia (2020). "Retratos masculinos: Sobre Loren Cameron, Yukio Mishima e Johnny vai à guerra" [Masculine Portraits: About Loren Cameron, Yukio Mishima, and Johnny Goes to War]. Periódicus (in Portuguese). 1 (13): 115–130. doi:10.9771/peri.v1i13.35694. ISSN 2358-0844.
