= Sydney Pokorny =

American lesbian writer, editor, columnist and activist (1965 – 2008)

- Sydney Pokorny
- Born: December 23, 1965
- Died: September 1, 2008 (aged 42); Park Ridge, New Jersey
- Occupations: author, writer, activist
- Writing career
- Genres: sociology, LGBT
- Notable work: So You Want to be a Lesbian?

Sydney Pokorny (23 December 1965 – 1 September 2008) was an American lesbian writer, art critic, editor, columnist and activist based in New York. She graduated from Vassar College in 1988 with a degree in art history. The author of numerous articles on topics ranging from "Madonna Studies" to art criticism and the AIDS epidemic; she also cowrote the Lambda Literary Award nominated So You Want to be a Lesbian? with Liz Tracey.

== ACT-UP and the Women's Caucus ==
In 1989, she joined the newly formed Women's Caucus of ACT-UP after nearly a year in the group protesting housing issues, governmental policy, and lack of action by city and state agencies. As part of the Women's Caucus of ACT-UP she and other Caucus members put together a "teach-in" on the politics and problems faced by women with AIDS. This was the first public forum to specifically address the spectrum of issues faced by women living with AIDS. Her contribution, an essay on the epidemiological differences observed by researchers studying the presenting symptoms and progression of AIDS in men and women was included in the Women and AIDS Handbook that documented the teach-in. The Handbook was, until the early 90s, the only document to focus on all the issues faced by the growing number of women infected with HIV and living with AIDS. The Handbook was translated into nearly 90 different languages. Later published in a revised and expanded form as Women, Aids & Activism by South End Press in 1990, Pokorny's essay provided the impetus for a lengthier treatise on the subject of epidemiological issues and her essay, while not appearing in the book provided the research for the expanded and revised essay on the issue that did appear. She was given credit in the book's introduction.

== "Obsess Yourself" ==
Pokorny published numerous articles in Boston's Gay Community News. One of her contributions, cultural criticism on Madonna and "the lesbian gaze" called "Obsess Yourself" was published in the Gay Community News in 1989. It became an oft-cited work in the then growing field of "Madonna Studies." "Obsess Yourself" attempted to blend autobiography, cultural studies, minority cultures, issues of identity and Madonna. Quotations from "Obsess Yourself" may be found in essay collections as diverse as: AIDS and the National Body by Thomas E. Yingling and Robyn Wiegman, Acting Out: Lesbian Performances by Lynda Hart and Peggy Phelan, The Madonna Connection: Representational Politics, Subcultural Identities, and Cultural Theory, edited by Cathy Schwichtenberg and I Dream of Madonna, edited by Kay Turner. Arlene Stein references the article in her book Sisters, Sexperts, Queers: Beyond the Lesbian Nation, noting Pokorny's observance that Madonna was both "[c]lothed in the language of heterosexuality" but "soliciting a lesbian gaze." It was also part of the syllabus used in the University of Liverpool's course on Voice, Fragmentation, and Subjectivity in Popular Music.

== Collaborations with Liz Tracey, Outweek and So You Want to be a Lesbian ==
Following her contributions to the Gay Community News, Pokorny began contributing articles on gay and lesbian culture to the fledgling publication, Outweek. There she wrote humorous articles about everything from her passion for Coco Chanel to her admiration for drag queens Eventually, she teamed up with writer Liz Tracey to contribute a weekly nightlife column called "Out on the Town."

In 1995, Pokorny and Tracey published So You Want to be a Lesbian? (St.Martin's/Griffin), a tongue-in-cheek guide to late 1990s lesbian culture. The book was heralded in an article in Publishers Weekly as the beginning of a trend in humorous "how-to" books that included Lesbianism Made Easy by Helen Eisenbach, The History of Lesbian Hair by Mary Dugger, and The Homo Handbook by Judy Carter. So You Want be a Lesbian was nominated for a Lambda Literary Award the year it was released, losing out to The History of Lesbian Hair. So You Want to be a Lesbian? reached the number 2 spot in The Advocate magazine's best seller list on gay women in 1997, two years after its publication.

== Dead Jackie Susann Quarterly ==
When Outweek ceased publication, Tracey and Pokorny continued their writing collaboration and produced a self-published zine called "Dead Jackie Susann Quarterly" which was heavily influenced by the house balls and the way that fame and celebrity was lived out in the ball rituals. Dedicated to Jacqueline Susann, whom Pokorny called "a prophet of pop culture," two issues of the zine were produced by Pokorny and Tracey in 1992-93 and two more were published by Pokorny and other collaborators online. Pokorny's work in the publication was cited in The New York Times in 1997. One issue of the zine is also in New York University's Fales Collection of Papers by Contemporary writers. The issue is contained in a collection of papers donated by Dennis Cooper. The zine gathered press attention for its humor and wit which was aimed at everything from pop culture to the election of Bill Clinton. The zine was mentioned in the Village Voice, was selected as an editor's choice in the 'zine guide Factsheet Five, and written up in People magazine.

== Artforum, Bookforum, and later art and cultural criticism and editorial work ==
She has contributed art reviews, topical essays, film reviews and record reviews for numerous publications such as the British art journal Frieze, the Boston Phoenix, Artforum, Bookforum, Time Out NY, LGNY, and ROCKRGRL. Her review of Lisa Yuskavage's work in 1996 was cited in a critical work by Maria Elena Buszek on feminism and sexuality in pop culture. Pokorny also worked for Artforum as an associate editor in charge of coordinating book reviews, during which time she edited writers such as Greil Marcus and Thomas E. Crow and as editorial coordinator of the magazine's spin-off publication, a quarterly review of books related to art and culture, called Bookforum.

== Other work ==
Pokorny worked as a production assistant on the film "Paris is Burning" and is credited as "Sydney Pokorney." Through her work on the film, she became interested in some of the ideas raised in the film and attempted to work them out in her writing.

Sydney Pokorny died on 1 September 2008 in Park Ridge, NJ. She is survived by her mother.
