= Downtown Mall =

Shopping area in Charlottesville, Virginia

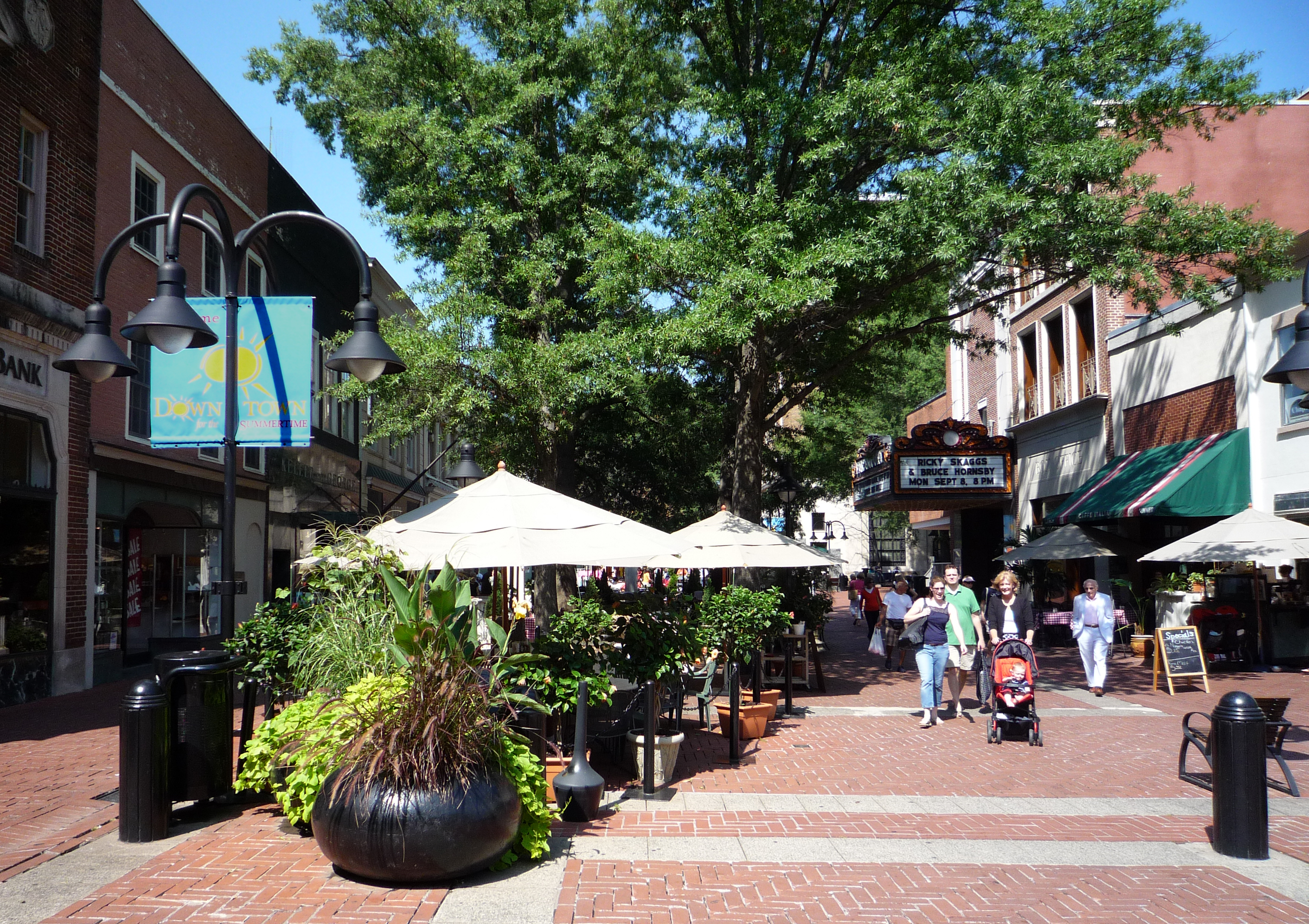
- The Downtown Mall with Paramount Theater in the background.
- Location: Charlottesville, Virginia
- Coordinates: 38°01′49″N 78°28′48″W
- Address: East Main Street
- Opened: 1978
- Architect: Lawrence Halprin
- Num. of stores: 40
- Website: friendsofcville.org

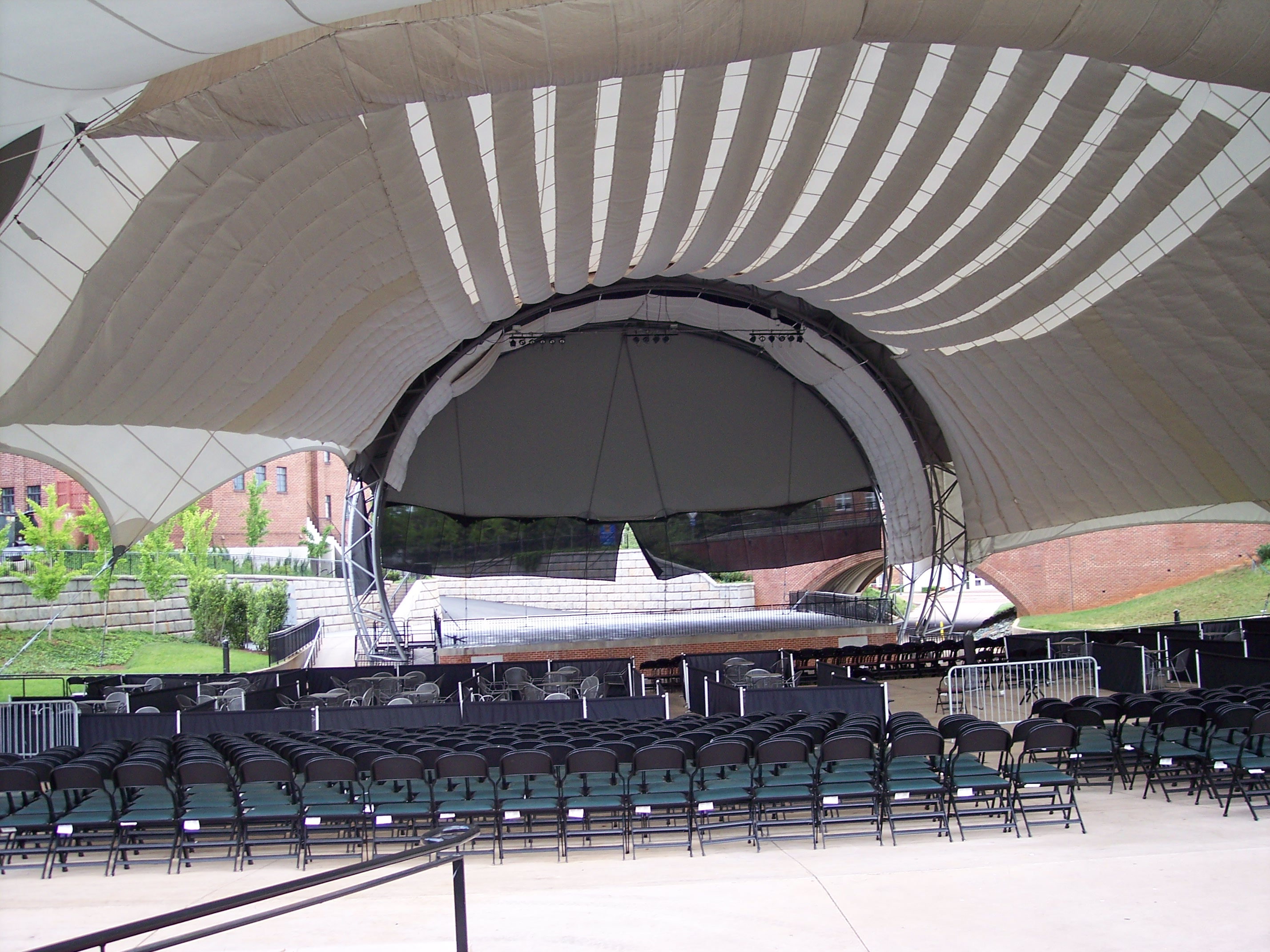
The Ting Pavilion at the east end of the mall.

The Downtown Mall in Charlottesville, Virginia, is one of the longest pedestrian malls in the United States. Located on Main Street, it runs from 6th St. N.E. to Old Preston Ave., where it extends to Water St., for total length of eight blocks. It is laid with brick and concrete, and home to an array of restaurants, shops, offices and art galleries. On Fridays in the spring, summer and fall, the Downtown Mall is host to Fridays After Five, a weekly concert series. Several side streets are also paved in brick and likewise closed to traffic. On the east, the Mall ends at the Ting Pavilion, an outdoor concert venue, while the west end of the Mall features an Omni Hotel. It is also home to the Paramount Theater and the historic Jefferson Theater.

== History ==
In 1976, East Main Street was converted into a pedestrian mall designed by landscape architect Lawrence Halprin. In 2007, Charlottesville planned a comprehensive rehabilitation and renovation of the Downtown Mall. Construction on the Mall Renovation began on Sunday, January 7, 2009 and was completed that summer. The 2017 Charlottesville car attack, in which a car was deliberately rammed into a crowd during a peaceful protest, occurred on Market Street, only one block away from the Downtown Mall. Portions of the Mall and adjacent streets were listed on the National Register of Historic Places as the Charlottesville Downtown Mall Historic District in 2024.

== Features ==
- Daedalus Books (Virginia)
- Dewberry Hotel
- Jefferson Theater (Virginia)
- Paramount Theater (Charlottesville, Virginia)
