= Dedalus Poppy =

Poppy

General information
- Type: Single seat sport homebuilt aircraft
- National origin: Italy
- Manufacturer: Dedalus srl, Milan

History
- First flight: May 1984

The Dedalus Poppy is a homebuilt, single engine, single seat ultralight aircraft flown in Italy in the 1980s. Several were built and flown; at least one remains on the Italian civil register in 2010.

== Design and development ==
The Poppy is a conventionally laid out, single engine, high wing ultralight. Its wings have constant chord and are braced with aluminium V struts attached to the lower fuselage longerons. The tailplane is mounted on top of the extreme rear of the tapered fuselage, with the elevators hinged beyond. The fin is broad and straight tapered, carrying a straight edged rudder which ends above the tailplane. The Poppy has a geodetic structure of Sitka spruce, covered with Dacron fabric apart from a glass fibre engine cowling.

The Poppy is powered by an 18.6 kW (25 hp) KFM 107E flat twin two-stroke engine. Its single-seat cabin is under the wings. It has a fixed, conventional undercarriage with mainwheels on cantilever legs attached to the lower fuselage.

The first flight was in May 1984.

== Operational history ==
The Poppy was a homebuilt aircraft, with kits available. Build time was about 300 hrs. In 1992 "many" Poppys were flying, though by mid-2010 only one remained on the registers of European countries west of Russia.

== Specifications ==
Data from Jane's All the World's Aircraft 1992-93

General characteristics

- Capacity: 1
- Length: 10.60 m (34 ft 9 in)
- Wingspan: 5.90 m (19 ft 4 in)
- Height: 1.40 m (4 ft 7 in)
- Wing area: 15.00 m^{2} (161.5 sq ft)
- Airfoil: Rhode St Genese 34
- Empty weight: 114 kg (251 lb)
- Max takeoff weight: 210 kg (463 lb)
- Fuel capacity: 20 L (4.4 Imp gal, 18.5 US gal)
- Powerplant: 1 × KFM 107E flat twin two-stroke, 19 kW (25 hp)
- Propellers: 2-bladed, 1.4 m (4 ft 7 in) diameter

Performance

- Maximum speed: 100 km/h (62 mph, 54 kn)
- Cruise speed: 80 km/h (50 mph, 43 kn) economical
- Stall speed: 40 km/h (25 mph, 22 kn)
- Range: 200 km (120 mi, 110 nmi)
- Rate of climb: 3.05 m/s (600 ft/min)
