= Bernadette Brooten =

American religious scholar

- Awards: MacArthur Fellowship

Academic background
- Education: University of Portland; Harvard University

Academic work
- Discipline: Religious scholar
- Institutions: Claremont Graduate University; University of Tübingen; Harvard Divinity School; Brandeis University
- Main interests: New Testament, feminism

Bernadette J. Brooten is an American religious scholar and Kraft-Hiatt Professor of Christian Studies at Brandeis University.

== Biography ==
Brooten graduated from University of Portland with a B.A., and Harvard University with a Ph.D. in 1982. Her doctoral thesis was entitled Inscriptional Evidence for Women as Leaders in the Ancient Synagogue. Brooten studied theology at the University of Tübingen and at Hebrew University. She taught at the Claremont Graduate School, the University of Tübingen, Harvard Divinity School, and the University of Oslo with a 1998 Fulbright Fellowship. She served on the Advisory Committee for the Women's Studies in Religion Program at Harvard Divinity School from 1997 to 2008. She is also a linguist with eight languages besides English to her credit.

Brooten is the founder and director of the Feminist Sexual Ethics Project at Brandeis.

Her work is located primarily within the New Testament, post-biblical Judaism, early literature and history, women and religion, and feminist sexual ethics (with a particular focus on law and sexuality).

She is currently writing a book on early Christian women who were enslaved or who owned enslaved laborers.

== Awards ==
- 1998 MacArthur Fellows Program
- National Endowment for the Humanities Fellowship

== Selected works ==
- "The modern face of slavery", The Boston Globe, November 19, 2006
- Beyond Slavery: Overcoming Its Religious and Sexual Legacies, Palgrave-MacMillan, 2010, ISBN 978-0-230-10017-6
- Women Leaders in The Ancient Synagogue: Inscriptional Evidence and Background Issues, Scholars Press, 1982, ISBN 978-0-89130-587-3
- Love Between Women: Early Christian Responses to Female Homoeroticism, University of Chicago Press, 1996, ISBN 978-0-226-07592-1
- "Female Homoeroticism", Immaculate & powerful: the female in sacred image and social reality, Editors Clarissa W. Atkinson, Constance H. Buchanan, Margaret Ruth Miles, Beacon Press, 1985, ISBN 978-0-8070-1004-4
- "Acts of the Apostles", Women priests: a Catholic commentary on the Vatican declaration, Editors Leonard J. Swidler, Arlene Swidler, Paulist Press, 1977, ISBN 978-0-8091-2062-8
- Frauen in der Männerkirche, Editors Bernadette Brooten, Norbert Greinacher, Kaiser, 1982, ISBN 978-3-459-01424-8
