= Patrick Merla =

Gay American literary agent and editor

Patrick Merla is an American "literary agent, editor and prominent figure in gay publishing."

Born in New York City. Patrick Merla edited three of the most well-known gay publications in the United States: Christopher Street, The New York Native and the James White Review. His literary essays, interviews, and film, theatre and book reviews have appeared in Saturday Review, New York Newsday, Out, Christopher Street, New York Native, Interview, Theatre Week, and House Beautiful.

Reviewing his book Boys Like Us, the Library Journal said, "Aside from the sheer literary quality, this book is an important step in providing role models to ease the pain of young gay people as they approach their own self-identity. Highly recommended for all public libraries and especially for gay/lesbian collections."

Merla was the recipient of the 2016 Publishing Triangle Leadership Award, along with fellow editors Charles Ortleb and Tom Steele and advisor Michael Denneny, on behalf of Christopher Street, for its "invaluable contribution to our community and culture."

== Works ==
- Tales of Patrick Merla Ballantine Books, New York. 1985. ISBN 0-345-32252-5
- Boys like us : gay writers tell their coming out stories / edited by Patrick Merla. 1st ed. New York : Avon Books, 1996. xviii, 365 p. : ill. ; 25 cm. ISBN 0-380-97340-5 (hardcover)
- "A Normal Heart," a biography of Larry Kramer, in: We Must Love One Another or Die: The Life and Legacies of Larry Kramer, Festschrift compiled by Lawrence Mass (St. Martin's and Cassell, London, 1998) ISBN 0312177046
- "'What Is Real?' Asked the Rabbit One Day" in: Only Connect: Readings in Children's Literature, 2nd ed., compiled by Sheila Egoff (Oxford University Press, 1980).
- The touch : what you don't know can kill you, with Stephen Altman. ibooks, New York, Simon & Schuster London, 2000 ISBN 0-7434-0715-6
