= Selim Zilkha =

Iraqi-born British entrepreneur (born 1927)

- Born: Selim Khedouri Zilkha; 7 April 1927; Baghdad, Iraq
- Died: September 16, 2022 (aged 95); Bel Air, California, U.S.
- Education: Williams College
- Occupation: Entrepreneur
- Known for: Founder of Mothercare
- Spouse: Diane Bashi (divorced)
- Children: 2, including Michael Zilkha
- Parent: Khedouri Zilkha
- Relatives: Ezra Zilkha (brother); Abdullah Zilkha (brother); Maurice Zilkha (brother)

Selim Khedouri Zilkha (7 April 1927 – 16 September 2022) was an Iraqi-born British entrepreneur, who founded Mothercare, one of the UK's largest retail chains until it was put into administration in 2019.

== Early life ==
Zilkha was born in 1927 in Baghdad to an Iraqi Jewish family, the son of the banker Khedouri Zilkha, and raised in Lebanon, Egypt and the United States. He was educated at the Horace Mann School in New York City and Williams College in Williamstown, Massachusetts. He was in the US Army during the Second World War.

== Career ==
Zilkha worked in finance in the family firm, Zilkha & Sons, from 1947 to 1960.

Zilkha then moved to the UK, where he, together with Clinical Industries Limited, bought dispensing chemist Lewis & Burrows from Mappin and Webb. In 1961, he bought the 50-store W.J. Harris nursery furniture chain, which he renamed Mothercare, and expanded it until it had over 400 stores. He sold his interest in Mothercare in 1981 and moved back to the United States.

In 1982, he invested $28 million in Towner Petroleum and, in 1998, he sold his investment for $1 billion.

In 2001, his net worth was estimated at US$700 million.

In 2002, he donated $20 million to complete a Neurogenetic Institute in Los Angeles.

In 2010, he became the co-owner of Zilkha Biomass Energy, which owns timberland and which makes pellet biofuel in Texas.

In 2016, he received an honorary doctorate from the University of Southern California.

He was also the co-owner of Laetitia Vineyard & Winery, Inc. in San Luis Obispo, California, until 2019.

== Personal life ==
He married Diane Bashi, the daughter of a wealthy Lebanese banker. They had divorced by 1962, before she was 25, and she married the British politician Harold Lever (later Harold Lever, Baron Lever of Manchester).

They had a son, Michael Zilkha, the co-founder of ZE Records, and a daughter, Nadia Zilkha.

Zilkha died on 16 September 2022.
