= Daedalus Books (Virginia) =

Independent book store in Charlottesville, Virginia

Coordinates: 38.0308°N 78.4790°W

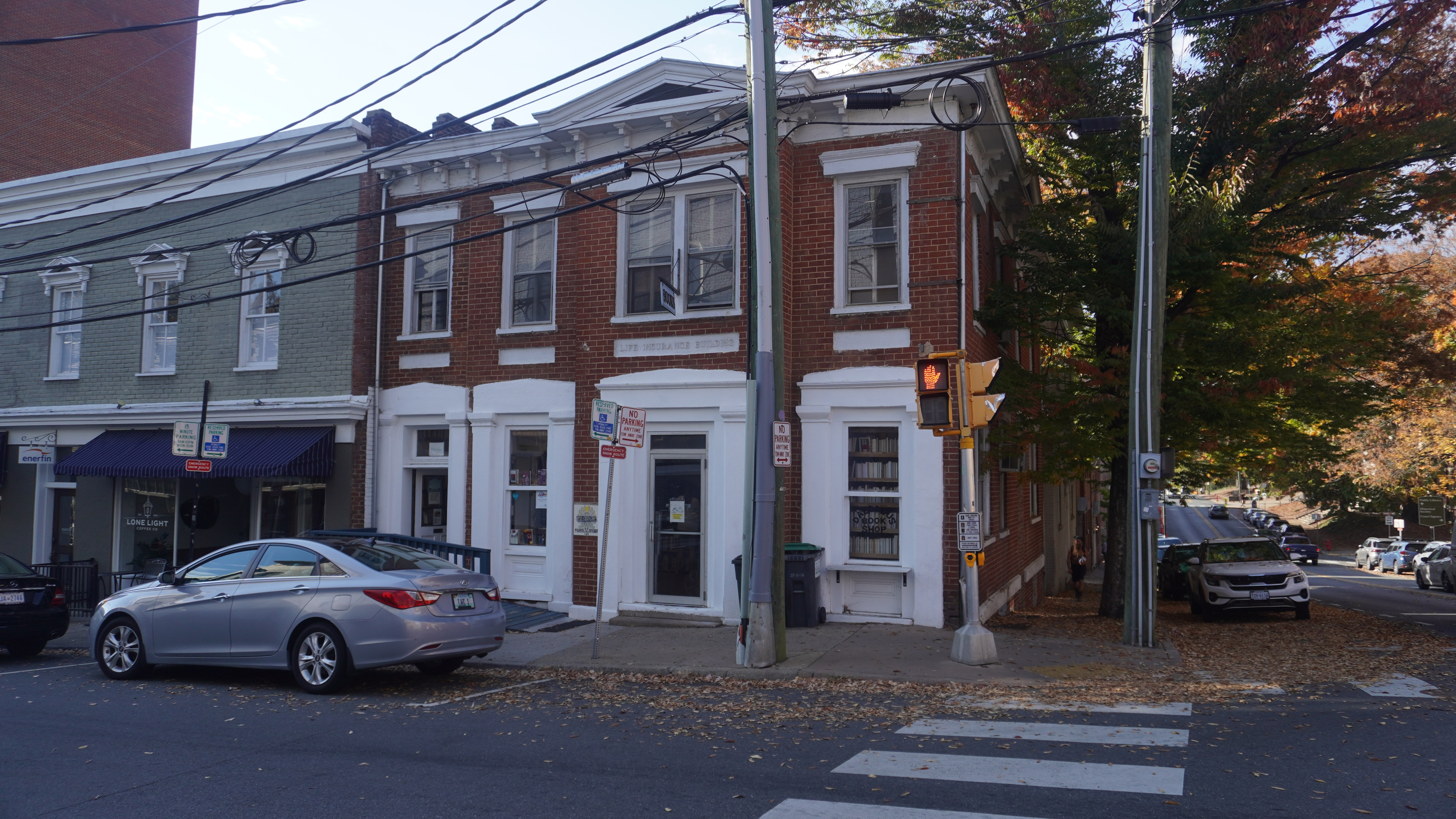
- Industry: Bookseller
- Founded: 1975
- Founder: Sandy McAdams
- Headquarters: Charlottesville, Virginia, United States
- Area served: Charlottesville, Virginia metropolitan area
- Products: Used book
- Owner: Jackson Landers

Daedalus Books is a used bookstore based in the Downtown Mall of Charlottesville, Virginia. It was established in 1975. It contains more than 100,000 books and is a quirky institution in the city. A reviewer for The Washington Post described Daedalus as the best bookstore south of the Strand Bookstore in Greenwich Village.

== Description ==
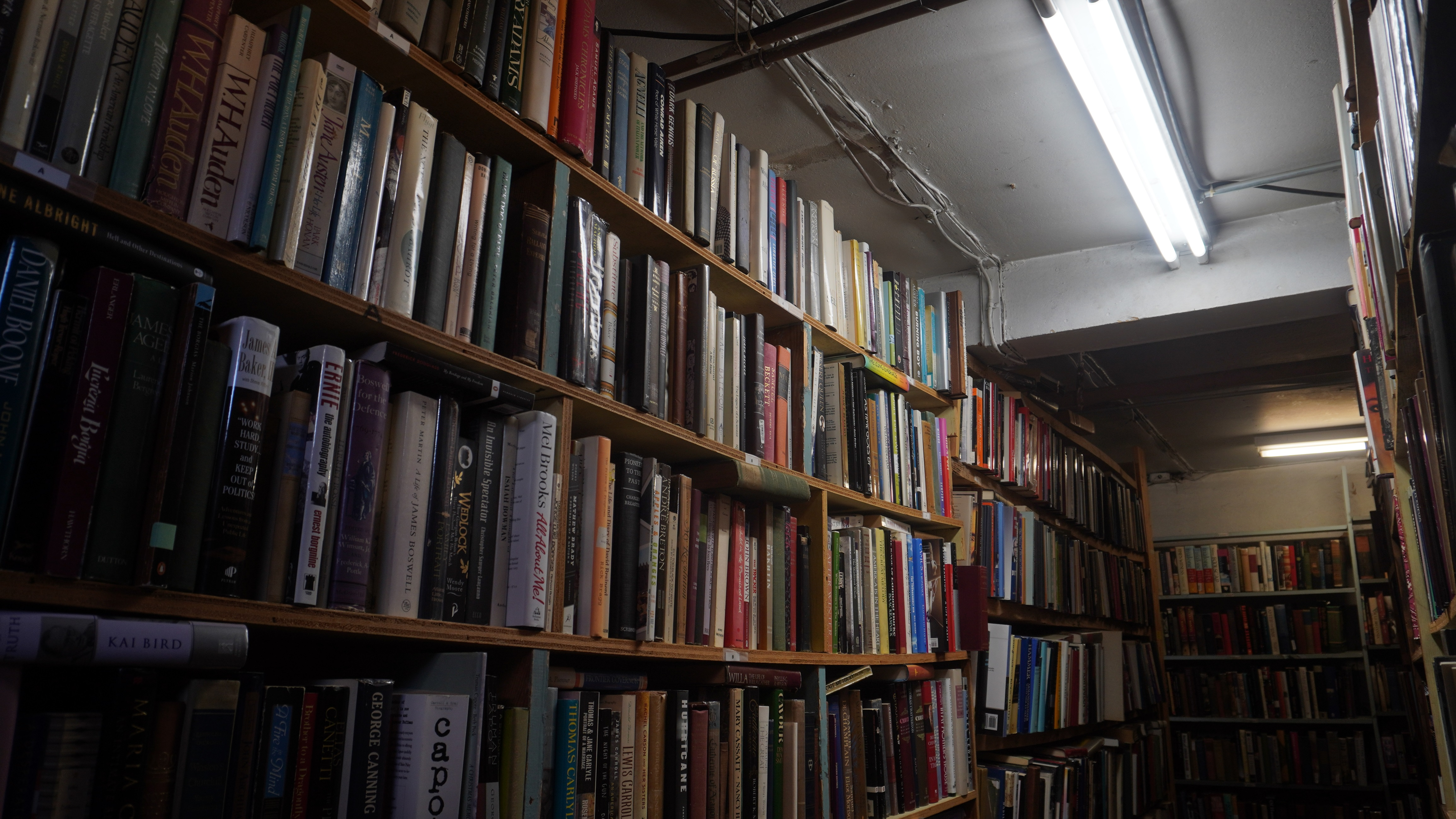
People describe Daedalus Books as a labyrinth.

The bookstore has been in the same location for more than 50 years, and its building is more than 100 years old. It keeps more than 100,000 books. The store issues hand-written receipts. The poetry room at Daedalus attracts particular attention. Poetry attractions include the death mask of John Keats.

Charlottesville's Downtown Mall is a destination for those visiting bookstores including Daedalus. It is also part of a network of other unconventional Charlottesville business. Various reviewers list Daedalus among Charlottesville's top attractions. Reviewers describe the store as cozy, a place to get lost, bewildering, and a three-story temple of secondhand literature. The name of the store refers to Daedalus because the bookshelves create a Labyrinth in which people become lost.

Author Rita Mae Brown said that Daedalus and McAdams delighted her. Poet Lawrence Ferlinghetti said that his visit to Daedalus was an honor for him.

== People ==
Sandy McAdams (1942-2024) established the store and managed it. One reviewer said that McAdams and the bookstore looked like each other. McAdams also started a restaurant near the bookstore, and is credited with developing Charlottesville's Downtown Mall, as a place for food and browsing books. After owning the shop for 30 years, Sandy McAdams committed to only read novels in an effort to gain wisdom rather than read nonfiction and only learn facts. McAdams was diagnosed with multiple sclerosis in 2000 and managed the store while using a wheelchair from 2008. McAdams sold the shop in 2023 and died in 2024.

Jackson Landers purchased the bookstore from McAdams in 2023. McAdams wanted to pass the store to someone who could maintain it as a Charlottesville institution. Jackson himself is a journalist and author.

== Further consideration ==
Allard, Terri (April 9, 2016). "Daedalus Bookshop". Charlottesville Inside-Out. Season 9. Charlottesville, Virginia: PBS. VPM Media Corporation.
