= Daedalus Books (Ohio) =

American bookseller

Coordinates: 39.1734°N 76.8462°W

- Founded: 1980; 46 years ago
- Founder: Robert (Robin) Moody
- Defunct: 2024
- Headquarters: Hudson, Ohio, U.S.
- Products: Books; music; video
- Website: daedalusbooks.com

Daedalus Books was a seller of books, music, and video founded in 1980. and closed in 2024. It sold new titles, but the Daedalus Books' specialty was the remaindered book. Its philosophy was to keep bestsellers, classics, and overlooked gems available to the reading public via catalogs and a website.

Although initially a wholesale endeavor, the company over the years grew a retail division that ultimately brought in roughly 60% of annual revenue. In 2018, upon the retirement of Daedalus' founder, Robert (Robin) Moody, the wholesale division of the company shut down. In February of that year, the company sold its retail catalog and online operations to Universal Screen Arts.

Daedalus Books had an outlet store at the front of its 120,000-square-foot (11,000 m^{2}) warehouse located in Columbia, Maryland, both of which closed in 2018. In 2006, it opened a store in Belvedere Square, Baltimore. However, in 2011, this branch also closed.

Daedalus went into involuntary bankruptcy in November of 2024.
