= Ezra Zilkha =

American financier (1925 - 2019)

- Born: Ezra Khedouri Zilkha; July 31, 1925; Baghdad, Iraq
- Died: October 2, 2019 (aged 94); New York City, U.S.
- Occupations: Financier, philanthropist
- Spouse: Cecile Iny
- Children: 3, including Donald Zilkha
- Parent: Khedouri Zilkha
- Relatives: Selim Zilkha (brother); Abdullah Zilkha (brother); Maurice Zilkha (brother)

Ezra Khedouri Zilkha (July 31, 1925 – October 2, 2019) was an American financier and philanthropist.

== Early life ==
Ezra Zilkha was born on July 31, 1925, in Baghdad, the son of the banker Khedouri Zilkha. He grew up in Baghdad, Beirut, Cairo, and New York City.

== Career ==
Zilkha worked for the family's banking businesses in Hong Kong, London, Amsterdam, the Netherlands, and Paris, before working for various companies in the US, In 1985, his net worth was estimated at US$150 million. and Zilkha was in the Forbes 400 list of richest Americans.

He was president of Zilkha & Sons from 1956, president of Intermediate Corporation from 1991.

== Philanthropy ==
His philanthropy especially in education, the arts and for the disabled, was "formidable". He was a trustee of the International Center for the Disabled and The American Society of the French Legion of Honor, a trustee emeritus of Wesleyan University, and an honorary trustee of the Brookings Institution.

== Personal life ==
In February 1950, he married Cecile Iny, and they had three children, Donald, Donna, and Bettina.

Zilkha died at his home on October 2, 2019.
