= Khedouri Zilkha =

Iraqi-Jewish banker (1884–1956)

- Born: 1884; Baghdad, Iraq
- Died: 1956 (aged 71–72); New York City, U.S.
- Occupation: Banker
- Spouse: Louise (Bashi) Zilkha
- Children: 7, including: Ezra Zilkha; Selim Zilkha; Maurice Zilkha; Abdullah Zilkha

Khedouri Aboody Zilkha (1884–1956) was an Iraqi-Jewish banker.

== Early life ==
Khedouri Zilkha was born in Baghdad in 1884 (or 1886), the only son of the textile merchant Aboudi Zilkha (1862–1904).

== Career ==
He started as a banker in Baghdad in 1902, founding Zilkha Bank, and gradually expanded to Beirut (Banque Zilkha), Damascus, Cairo, Alexandria, Geneva, New York, Paris and the Far East.

In 1941 or 1942, he emigrated to New York and died there in 1956.

== Personal life ==
He married Louise (Bashi) Zilkha and had four sons and three daughters:

- Ezra Zilkha
- Selim Zilkha
- Maurice Zilkha
- Abdullah Zilkha
- Helene Zilkha
- Hanina Zilkha
- Bertie Zilkha

His son Ezra was an American financier and philanthropist. His son Selim was a British entrepreneur who founded the large Mothercare chain. His son Abdullah ran an investment bank in Zurich named Ufitec. His son Maurice was an Egyptian banker.

== Legacy ==
His son Ezra established in his father's memory the Khedouri Zilkha Fund for the Study of the History of Jewish Civilization in the Near East at Princeton University. The fund supports a professorship, the current holder of which is Marina Rustow and past holders Mark R. Cohen and Abraham Udovitch.
