= Red Light Management =

American entertainment company

- Industry: Entertainment
- Founded: January 19, 1991; 35 years ago
- Headquarters: United States
- Area served: Worldwide
- Key people: Coran Capshaw
- Website: redlightmanagement.com

Red Light Management is an international, independent music management company founded by Coran Capshaw.

Coran Capshaw founded Red Light Management in 1991 in Charlottesville, VA, shortly before taking on the management of the Dave Matthews Band during its breakout period from local band to international touring group. Red Light has since developed global reach, with offices in London and multiple cities in the United States, managing artists such as Phish, Chris Stapleton, The Strokes, and Enrique Iglesias. The management group has been noted for its ability to navigate the changing landscape of concert tour promotion and other facets of the music management business since its founding.
