= Echosmith discography =

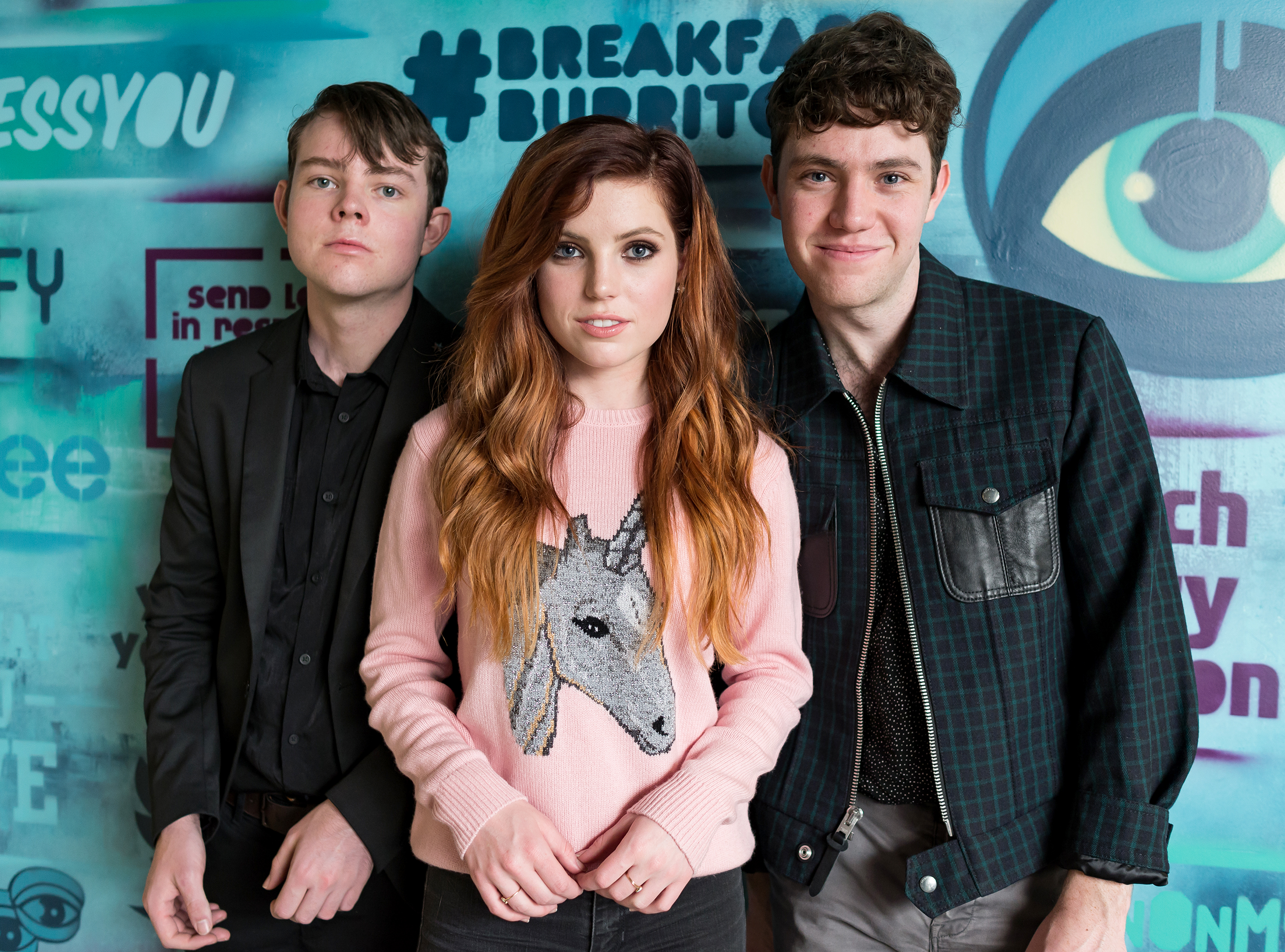
- Echosmith as a trio in 2017. From left to right: Graham Sierota, Sydney Sierota and Noah Sierota.
- Studio albums: 3
- EPs: 5
- Singles: 14

The discography of American indie pop band Echosmith. Talking Dreams, the band's debut studio album, was released in October 2013, the album peaked at number 38 on the Billboard 200. The album includes the singles "Cool Kids", "Bright" and "Let's Love". "Cool Kids" reached number 13 on the Billboard Hot 100 and was certified triple platinum by the RIAA with over 1,200,000 sales in the United States and also double platinum by ARIA in Australia. The song was Warner Bros. Records' fifth-biggest-selling-digital song of 2014, with 1.3 million downloads sold. Lonely Generation, the band's second studio album, was released in January 2020. The album includes the singles "Lonely Generation" and "Shut Up and Kiss Me".

== Studio albums ==
Title	Details	Peak chart positions										Certifications
Title	Details	US	AUS	AUT	BEL	DEN	GER	NL	SWE	SWI	UK	Certifications
Talking Dreams	Released: October 1, 2013; Label: Warner Bros.; Formats: CD, LP, download	38	45	39	85	23	47	46	56	35	151	RIAA: Gold; RMNZ: Gold
Lonely Generation	Released: January 10, 2020; Label: Echosmith Music LLC; Format: CD, LP, download	— (Note: Lonely Generation did not enter the US Billboard 200 chart, but peaked at number 61 on the US Album Sales chart.)	—	—	—	—	—	—	—	—	—	
Echosmith	Released: July 28, 2023; Label: Echosmith Music LLC	—	—	—	—	—	—	—	—	—	—	
"—" denotes a recording that did not chart or was not released in that territory.

== Extended plays ==
Title	Details	Peak chart positions
Title	Details	US Heat
Summer Sampler	Released: June 11, 2013; Label: Warner Bros.; Formats: CD, Digital download	—
Acoustic Dreams	Released: June 10, 2014; Label: Warner Bros.; Formats: CD, LP, Digital download	34
Spotify Sessions	Released: February 24, 2015; Label: Warner Bros.; Formats: Streaming	—
Inside a Dream	Released: September 29, 2017; Label: Warner Bros.; Formats: Digital download, streaming	—
An Echosmith Christmas	Released: November 10, 2017; Label: Warner Bros.; Formats: Digital download, streaming	—
"—" denotes a recording that did not chart or was not released in that territory.

== Singles ==
=== As lead artist ===
List of singles, with selected chart positions and certifications, showing year released and album name
Title	Year	Peak chart positions										Certifications	Album
Title	Year	US	AUS	AUT	BEL	CAN	DEN	GER	NZ	SWI	UK	Certifications	Album
"Cool Kids"	2013	13	6	5	36	25	6	8	13	9	17	RIAA: 4× Platinum; ARIA: 2× Platinum; BPI: Platinum; BVMI: Gold; IFPI DEN: Platinum; IFPI SWI: Gold; MC: Platinum; RMNZ: 2× Platinum	Talking Dreams
"Come Together"	2013	—	—	—	— (Note: "Come Together" did not enter the Flanders Ultratop 50, but peaked at number 50 on the Ultratip chart.)	—	—	—	—	— (Note: "Come Together" did not enter the Swiss Singles chart, but charted at number 97 on the Swiss Airplay chart.)	—		Talking Dreams
"Bright"	2015	40	—	—	— (Note: "Bright" did not enter the Flanders Ultratop 50, but peaked at number 17 on the Ultratip chart.)	81	—	—	—	—	—	RIAA: Platinum	Talking Dreams
"Let's Love"	2015	—	—	—	—	—	—	—	—	—	—		Talking Dreams
"Over My Head"	2018	—	—	—	—	—	—	—	—	—	—		Non-album single
"Favorite Sound" (with Audien)	2019	—	—	—	—	—	—	—	—	—	—		Escapism
"God Only Knows" (Timbaland Remix) (with For King & Country)	2019	—	—	—	—	—	—	—	—	—	—		Burn the Ships (Deluxe Edition: Remixes & Collaborations)
"Lonely Generation"	2019	—	—	—	—	—	—	—	—	—	—		Lonely Generation
"Shut Up and Kiss Me"	2019	—	—	—	—	—	—	—	—	—	—		Lonely Generation
"Hang Around"	2022	—	—	—	—	—	—	—	—	—	—		Echosmith
"Gelato"	2022	—	—	—	—	—	—	—	—	—	—		Echosmith
"Hindsight"	2023	—	—	—	—	—	—	—	—	—	—		Echosmith
"Sour"	2023	—	—	—	—	—	—	—	—	—	—		Echosmith
"Feminine Rage" / "Jaded"	2024	—	—	—	—	—	—	—	—	—	—		Non-album single
"—" denotes a recording that did not chart or was not released in that territory.

=== Promotional singles ===
Title	Year	Album
"Tonight We're Making History"	2012	Non-album single
"I Heard the Bells on Christmas Day"	2013	An Echosmith Christmas
"Goodbye"	2017	Inside a Dream
"Future Me"	2017	Inside a Dream
"Dear World"	2017	Inside a Dream
"Get Into My Car"	2017	Inside a Dream
"This Must Be the Place (Naïve Melody)"	2019	Non-album singles
"Reflektor"	2019	Non-album singles

- With You (2021): Pokemon Journeys Season 1 Theme Song
