= Young Summer =

American singer/songwriter

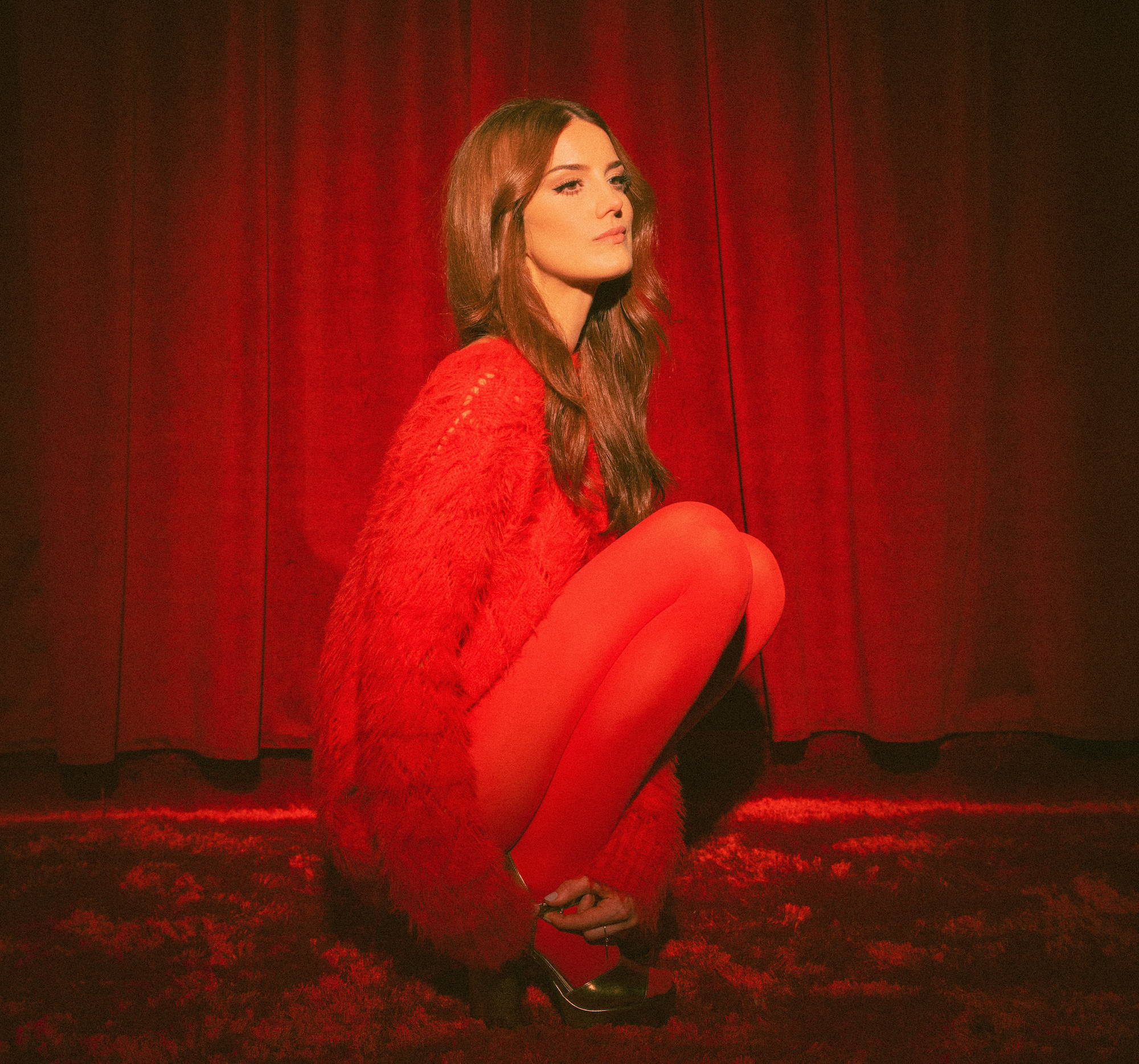
- Young Summer in 2023

Background information
- Born: Barbara Allen
- Origin: Washington D.C., United States
- Genre: Indie pop
- Occupations: Singer; songwriter
- Instruments: Vocals, guitar, piano
- Years active: 2013–present
- Labels: Ready Set Music, Dead Spirit Animal
- Website: youngsummermusic.com

Bobbie Allen, known professionally as Young Summer, is an American singer, songwriter based out of Nashville, Tennessee. Her first studio album, Siren, was released in August 2014. The first single "Alright" from her second EP, You Would Have Loved It Here, was released in June 2016 to positive reviews. She released her second full-length record in October 2023 and it was named one of the best album's of 2023 by SPIN magazine.

Allen co-wrote Echosmith's song "Goodbye", the lead single from their EP Inside a Dream.

In 2019, Allen covered "Take Me Out" by Franz Ferdinand. Her version appears on the soundtrack for the Hulu TV series, Looking for Alaska, which is based on the 2005 novel by John Green.

In May 2023, Allen began promoting her self-titled second full-length album. It was named one of the best albums of 2023 by Spin. The first single "Make Waves" of which the video has been watched over 400,000 times as of July 2023. Her self-titled full-length album was released on October 13, 2023.

On September 6, 2024, A deluxe edition of Allen's self-titled record, Young Summer, was released. It added the songs “Undone” and “Closer to You,” along with stripped-down versions of “Burning Down Paradise” and “My My.”

The trailer for the fourth season trailer The Morning Show featured Allen’s cover of the song, “Just My Imagination". The show also used her song “If the World Falls to Pieces” during the final moments and end credits of the season’s third episode.

== Discography ==
Studio albums

- Siren (2014)
- Young Summer (2023)
- Young Summer (Deluxe) (2024)

Extended plays

- Fever Dream (2013)
- You Would Have Loved It Here (2017)

Singles

- "Fever Dream" (2013)
- "Why Try" (2013)
- "Taken" (2014)
- "Alright" (2016)
- "Paused Parade" (2016)
- "Fallout" (2016)
- "Echo" (2016)
- "Old Chunk of Coal" (2016)
- "If the World Falls to Pieces" (September 25, 2020)
- "The Emperor" (October 23, 2020)
- "Make Waves" (May 5, 2023)
- "My My" (June 16, 2023)
- "Just My Imagination" (June 26, 2025)

== Songwriting credits ==
List of songwriting credits
Title	Year	Artist	Album	Co-written with
Build Me A Dream	2026	Alicia Witt	Between Heaven and Earth	Alicia Witt, Ruslan Odnoralov
One Becoming Two	2025	Sontalk	One Becoming Two	Sontalk, Bill Reynolds (Band of Horses)
I'm Coming Over	2024	Sontalk	I'm Coming Over	Sontalk, FEMKE
Lovesong	2024	Baker Grace	It Ends With Me	Baker Grace, BOSKI
Butterflies	2024	Baker Grace	It Ends With Me	Baker Grace, BOSKI
Wasn't You	2024	Housewife	Divorce	Housewife, Carrie K
Party Tricks	2024	Lippy	Party Tricks	Matt Lipkins, Sammy Martin
Stand Still	2023	Gatlin	I Sleep Fine Now	Gatlin, Carrie K
Too Sensitive	2023	Brye	Too Sensitive	Brye, Ruslan Odnoralov
My Apartment	2023	James Droll	My Apartment	James Droll, Caro Bae
Stop Looking Over The Edge	2022	James Droll	Stop Looking Over The Edge	James Droll, Reed Berin
Fly On	2022	Karen Elson	The Birdsong Project	Karen Elson, Konrad Snyder
Shapeshifter	2022	Brye	Shapeshifter	Brye, Nick Lobel
Rage	2021	Madi Diaz	History Of A Feeling	Madi Diaz, Konrad Snyder
Slow Motion Doves	2021	Shadowboxers	Slow Motion Doves	Matt Lipkins, Adam Hoffman, Sammy Martin, Tyler Schwartz
Need You Now	2021	William Black	Pieces	Forester, William Black
Automatic World	2020	The Brummies	Automatic World	John Davidson, Jacob Bryant
Being Alone	2020	Gatlin	Sugarcoated	Gatlin, Konrad Snyder
Summer Coat	2020	Gatlin	Sugarcoated	Gatlin, Nick Lobel
Don't Know What You Have	2020	Desert Noises	Everything Always	Kyle Henderson, Bill Reynolds
Skywriter	2019	Copeland	Blushing	Aaron Marsh
Goodbye	2017	Echosmith	Inside a Dream	
