= Summer Sampler =

Summer Sampler may refer to:

- Summer Sampler (See You Next Tuesday EP), 2005
- Summer Sampler (Echosmith EP), 2013
