= Miss Meteor =

2020 novel by Tehlor Kay Mejia and Anna-Marie McLemore

- Author: Tehlor Kay Mejia and Anna-Marie McLemore
- Genre: Young adult, fantasy, magical realism
- Publisher: HarperTeen
- Publication date: September 22, 2020
- ISBN: 9780062869913

Miss Meteor is a 2020 young adult fantasy novel by Tehlor Kay Mejia and Anna-Marie McLemore.

== Reception ==
Kirkus Reviews called Miss Meteor "a love letter to misfits who have been scared to let their stardust shine," noting that "extended metaphors of stardust and space magic could grow tired in less capable hands, but they work powerfully in Mejia and McLemore's descriptions of teenage emotional urgency when courage can be as a fleeting as a shooting star"

Shelf Awareness's Shelley Diaz noted that "the insidious effect of microaggressions and thinly veiled racism is [...] woven throughout, giving this seemingly light novel an added layer of empowerment". Despite the deep themes, Diaz said the novel "is filled with humor and fresh dialogue".

Alex Brown, writing for Tor.com, noted that "each antagonist represents a different side of the patriarchy: those who dominate and the people who prop them up and protect them." Brown further wrote,

This novel is the perfect blend of Tehlor Kay Mejia's brazen and daring adventures and Anna-Marie McLemore's quiet explorations of identity, friendships, and social expectations. The book is sweet and charming with the a cast of characters that will tug at your heartstrings. But there's a heat, too, of fiery personalities and passionate relationships. Rich with magical realism and dazzling prose, Miss Meteor checks every box. I can't wait for teens grappling with gender identity and expression to find this novel and see themselves reflected.

Also touching on some of the themes in the novel, Publishers Weekly wrote hat he "casual, genuine pansexual and trans representation, along with a racially diverse cast, adds nuance," calling Miss Meteor "an inclusive story brimming with tenderness for its characters while championing love and self-acceptance".

On behalf of Booklist, Maggie Reagan wrote, "Together, McLemore and Mejia tell a warmly inclusive story rooted in the bonds of family and in female friendship. For anyone who's ever felt like an outsider, this joyful #OwnVoices tale will fill a void."

Kiri Palm, writing for The Bulletin of the Center for Children's Books, wrote, "This complex tale packs a lot into its space, and while the novel is sure to resonate with any kid who feels like an outcast [...], it's especially salient for those in the Latinx, queer, and economically disadvantaged communities."

Booklist's Sonja Cole also reviewed the audiobook, saying narrators Kyla Garcia and Almarie Guerra "bring to life the dual perspectives [...] The vibrant energy of both narrators gives expression to the humor and hope in this heartfelt story about self-acceptance."

== Awards and honors ==
In 2020, Miss Meteor was a Tor.com Reviewers' Choice book and was included on their "Best Young Adult Science Fiction, Fantasy, and Horror of 2020" list.

The American Library Association included it on their 2021 Rainbow List and their list of the "Best Fiction for Young Adults."
