= Anna-Marie McLemore =

Mexican-American author

- Writing career
- Language: English
- Years active: 2011–present
- Genres: Young adult, magical realism
- Notable works: When the Moon Was Ours, The Weight of Feathers, Wild Beauty
- Notable awards: Stonewall Book Award, James Tiptree Jr. Award
- Website: author.annamariemclemore.com

Anna-Marie McLemore is a Mexican-American author of young adult fiction magical realism, best known for their Stonewall Honor-winning novel When the Moon Was Ours, Wild Beauty, and The Weight of Feathers.

== Personal life ==
McLemore is a queer Latine, which they cite as one of the reasons why they write inclusive, queer, Latinx casts. Their husband is transgender. McLemore themself is nonbinary and bigender, using singular they pronouns.

McLemore describes their work as inspired by the fairytales and stories they grew up with and their own background, which is why many of their novels feature magical-realist themes, queer characters, and Spanish and French language. They cite Laura Esquivel's novel Like Water for Chocolate as one of the reasons they started writing and name Carla Trujillo, Malinda Lo, Isabel Allende, and Federico García Lorca as some of their influences.

== Career ==
McLemore was named a Lambda Literary Emerging Writer Fellow in 2011.

Their debut young adult novel, The Weight of Feathers, was published in 2015 by Thomas Dunne Books. It deals with themes of discrimination and marginalization in a magical-realist story about black magic, and includes a generational feud between Mexican-American and Romani rival families. Their debut was chosen as a William C. Morris Debut Award Finalist in 2016 and received a starred review from Bulletin of the Center for Children's Books. It also was chosen for YALSA's 2016 Top Ten Best Fiction for Young Adults list.

Their second novel, When the Moon Was Ours, a magical-realist fairytale about a transgender Pakistani-American boy and a cisgender queer Latina falling in love, was published in 2016 by Thomas Dunne Books. It won the James Tiptree Jr. Award in 2016 and the Stonewall Honor Award in 2017. It was also named a Best Book of the Year by Kirkus Reviews and Booklist. When the Moon Was Ours received starred reviews from Kirkus Reviews, School Library Journal, and Booklist.

McLemore's third novel, Wild Beauty, about a family of cursed women and magical gardens, was published in 2017 by Feiwel and Friends. It again received three starred reviews from Kirkus Reviews, School Library Journal, and Booklist, and was also named a Best Book of the Year by Kirkus Reviews and Booklist. Wild Beauty was nominated for a Northern California Book Award in 2018.

Their fourth novel, Blanca & Roja, is a Latinx retelling of Swan Lake and Snow White and Rose Red, about two sisters who fall in love with a boy who can turn into a bear and a non-binary teen who can turn into a cygnet (a baby swan). It was published by Feiwel and Friends in 2018. Blanca & Roja received starred reviews from Kirkus Reviews, School Library Journal, and Booklist as well. School Library Journal named Blanca & Roja a best book of 2018.

Their fifth novel, Dark and Deepest Red, is a split-timeline story based on The Red Shoes, set in 1518 Strasbourg and 2018. The book was published in early 2020.

Their sixth novel, Miss Meteor, is about two girls attempting to change their town's future while they participate in a talent competition. It is their first co-written novel, together with author Tehlor Kay Mejia, and was published by HarperCollins in 2020.

McLemore's seventh novel, The Mirror Season, was published in March 2021 by Feiwel & Friends. It received a starred review from Kirkus.

Their eighth novel, Lakelore, was published in March 2022. Lakelore follows Lore, who has dyslexia, and Bastian, who has ADHD, as they navigate the waters of being teenagers who are trans, nonbinary, and Mexican American. It received a starred review from Kirkus.

Self-Made Boys: A Great Gatsby Remix, is McLemore's ninth novel, published in September 2022 by Feiwel & Friends. It is the fifth book in the young adult series Remixed Classics, which features authors of diverse backgrounds reinterpreting literary classics through their own unique lenses. Centering on 17-year-old Latinx, gay, and transgender boy Nicholás Caraveo, the novel reimagines The Great Gatsby to explore not just the deceptive decadence of New York, but the struggle to find where one fits in, representing themes such as the racism and queer lives of the 1920s.

Venom and Vow is their tenth novel, published in May 2023.

Their novels have been translated into Turkish, Italian, and Spanish.

They have also written several short stories and non-fiction essays for anthologies that were published with Ambush Books, Harlequin Teen, Candlewick, Simon Pulse, Soho Teen, and Algonquin Young Readers.

In 2024, an anthology of short stories McLemore contributed to, The Collectors: Stories, won the Michael L. Printz Award.

== Bibliography ==
=== Young adult novels ===
- The Weight of Feathers (Thomas Dunne Books, 2015)
- When the Moon Was Ours (Thomas Dunne Books, 2016)
- Wild Beauty (Feiwel and Friends, 2017)
- Blanca & Roja (Feiwel and Friends, 2018)
- Miss Meteor (co-written with Tehlor Kay Mejia) (HarperCollins, 2020)
- Dark and Deepest Red (Feiwel & Friends, 2020)
- The Mirror Season (Feiwel & Friends, 2021)
- Lakelore (Feiwel & Friends, 2022)
- Self-Made Boys: A Great Gatsby Remix (Feiwel & Friends, 2022)
- Venom & Vow (Feiwel & Friends, 2023)
- Flawless Girls (Feiwel & Friends, 2024)
- We Could Be Anyone (Feiwel & Friends, 2026)

=== Adult Novels ===
- The Influencers (Random House Publishing Group, 2025)

=== Short stories and essays ===
- Magical Mayhem, edited by Douglas Rees (Ambush Books, 2012)
- "Roja" in All Out: The No-Longer-Secret Stories of Queer Teens throughout the Ages, edited by Saundra Mitchell (Harlequin Teen, 2018)
- "Love Spell" in Toil & Trouble: 15 Tales of Women & Witchcraft, edited by Jessica Spotswood and Tess Sharpe (Harlequin Teen, 2018)
- "Glamour" in The Radical Element, edited by Jessica Spotswood (Candlewick, 2018)
- "Her Hair Was Not of Gold" in Our Stories, Our Voices: 21 YA Authors Get Real About Injustice, Empowerment, and Growing Up Female in America, edited by Amy Reed (Simon Pulse, 2018)
- "Panadería ~ Pastelería" in Hungry Hearts: 13 Tales of Food Love, edited by Elsie Chapman and Caroline Tung Richmond (Simon Pulse, 2019)
- "Umbra" on Issue 7 of Foreshadow: A Serial YA Anthology (2019)
- "Turn the Sky to Petals" in Color Outside the Lines, edited by Sangu Mandanna (Soho Teen, 2019)
- "The Blood on Their Hands" in Body Talk, edited by Kelly Jensen (Algonquin Young Readers, 2020)
- "Cristal y Ceniza" in A Universe of Wishes, edited by Dhonielle Clayton (Random House Children's Books, 2020)
- "King of the Fairies" in That Way Madness Lies, edited by Dahlia Adler (Flatiron Books, 2021)
- "Sugarplum" in At Midnight, edited by Dahlia Adler (Flatiron Books, 2022)
- "Blue Amber" in Faeries Never Lie: Tales to Revel In, edited by Zoraida Córdova and Natalie C. Parker (Feiwel & Friends, 2024)

== Awards and nominations ==
Year	Award	Work	Category	Result	Ref
2016	James Tiptree Jr. Award	When the Moon Was Ours	Best Book	Won	
2016	William C. Morris Debut Award	The Weight of Feathers	Best Young Adult Debut	Nominated (finalist)	
2016	National Book Award	When the Moon Was Ours	National Book Award for Young People's Literature	Nominated (Longlisted)	
2017	Stonewall Honor Award	When the Moon Was Ours	Children's and Young Adult Literature	Won	
2018	Northern California Book Award	Wild Beauty	Best Book, Children's Literature, Older Readers	Nominated (finalist)	
2022	National Book Award	Self-Made Boys: A Great Gatsby Remix	National Book Award for Young People's Literature	Nominated (Longlisted)	
2024	Michael L. Printz Award	The Collectors: Stories		Won	
