= We Unleash the Merciless Storm =

2020 young adult fantasy novel by Tehlor Kay Mejia

- Author: Tehlor Kay Mejia
- Genre: Young adult, fantasy, dystopian fiction, romance
- Publisher: Katherine Tegen Books
- Publication date: February 25, 2020
- ISBN: 9780062691347
- Preceded by: We Set the Dark on Fire

We Unleash the Merciless Storm is a 2020 young adult fantasy novel by Tehlor Kay Mejia. It is preceded by We Set the Dark on Fire.

== Reception ==
We Unleash the Merciless Storm was well-received, including starred reviews from Booklist and Kirkus Reviews, who called the novel "thrilling, timely, and terrific."

Maggie Reagan, writing for Booklist, noted, "Modern political issues are woven into the story, never didactically but with an urgency that lends substantial weight." On behalf of Shelf Awareness, Clarissa Hadge also highlighted how "the plot [is] full of arresting events that mirror current political and racial divides".

Several reviewers compared We Unleash the Merciless Storm and the first novel in the duology, We Se the Dark on Fire. Kirkus said the sequel "not only surpasses the accomplishments of its celebrated predecessor, but takes it to a higher, brighter level". Booklist's Reagan wrote, "Where the first volume was subtlety and shadows, this is emotion and adrenaline, and it will carry readers through to an ending that feels entirely earned." Alex Brown, writing for Tor.com noted that "at first, We Unleash the Merciless Storm felt wholly different from We Set the Dark on Fire. The pacing is slower and the tone harder, much of that due to the shift in character POV." With time, however, Brown realized "the more the parallels between the two novels became more evident". Shelf Awareness's Clarissa Hadge also noted that "Mejia writes an utterly captivating and thoroughly satisfying ending for the two young women, while leaving the world of Medio open for a potential return."

Tor.com's Brown also highlighted that with the second book in the series, the connections to Margaret Atwood's The Handmaid's Tale became less clear. Although they often refer to We Set the Dark on Fire as a "better and more queer" Handmaid's Tale, Brown notes that with We Unleash the Merciless Storm, it's clear that "Tehlor Kay Mejia is interested in bigger, more intersectional issues than Margaret Atwood ever was. The two novels together force readers to confront our expectations for the world and what we’ll do to secure them. She’s written a powerful series that defies the tropes of dystopian young adult fiction."

Booklist's Terry Hong also reviewed the audiobook, which was narrated by Kyla García. Hong noted that "García’s rhythmic narration is an instant draw, mirroring Carmen’s vigilant calculations. Her voice grows urgently charged at just the right moments [...] never giving in to melodramatic unrestraint."
