= Ahmad Nivins =

American basketball player (born 1987)

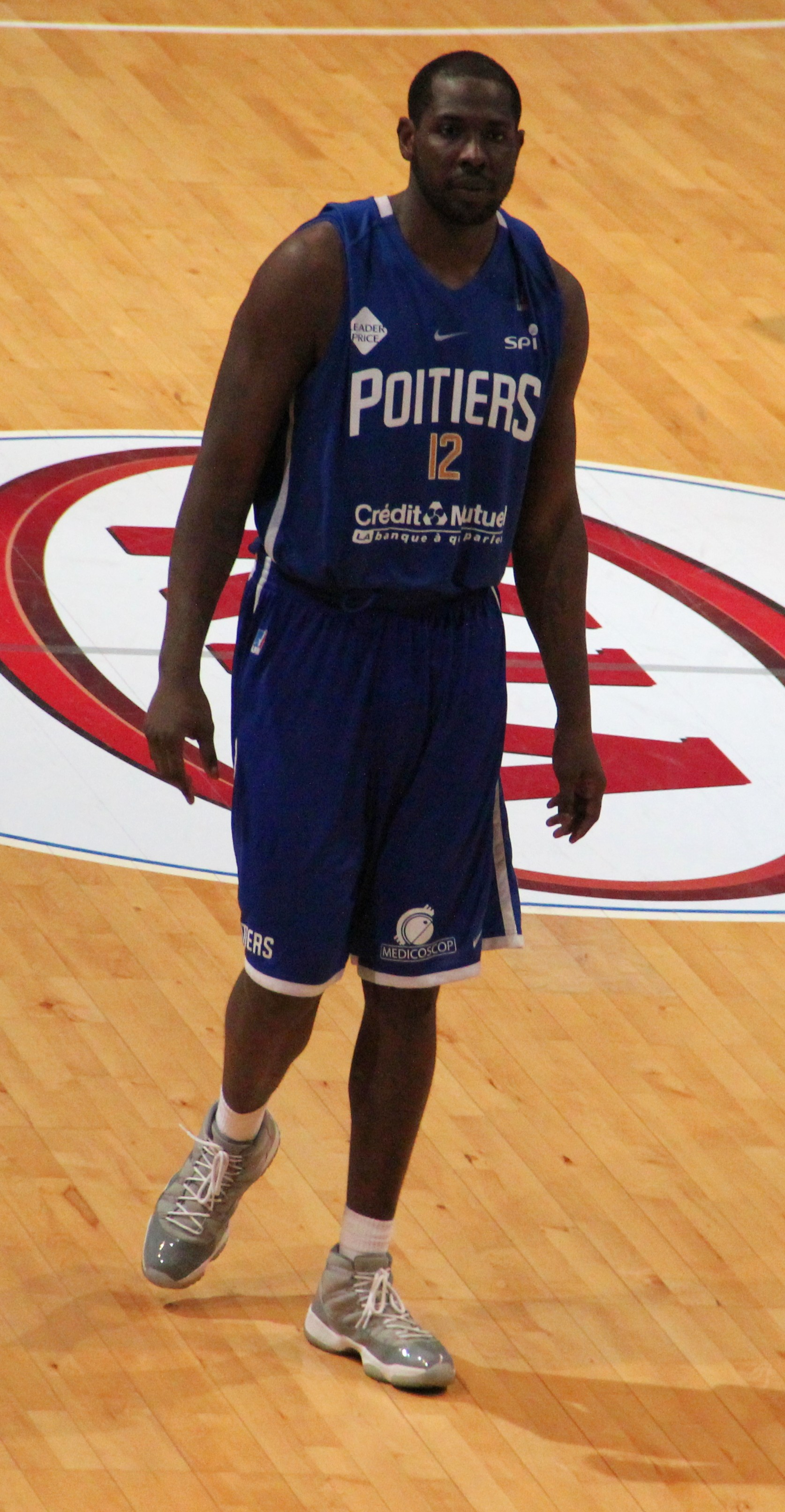
- Nivins with Poitiers Basket 86 in 2012

Personal information
- Born: February 10, 1987 (age 39) Jersey City, New Jersey, U.S.
- Listed height: 6 ft 9 in (2.06 m)
- Listed weight: 242 lb (110 kg)

Career information
- High school: County Prep (Jersey City, New Jersey); St. Anthony (Jersey City, New Jersey)
- College: Saint Joseph's (2005–2009)
- NBA draft: 2009: 2nd round, 56th overall pick
- Drafted by: Dallas Mavericks
- Playing career: 2009–2017
- Position: Power forward
- Number: 12
- Coaching career: 2019–2023

Career history

Playing
- 2009–2010: Bàsquet Manresa
- 2010–2012: Dexia Mons-Hainaut
- 2012–2013: Poitiers Basket 86
- 2013–2014: Élan Béarnais Pau-Orthez
- 2014–2016: ASVEL Basket
- 2016–2017: Orléans Loiret Basket

Coaching
- 2019–2020: Maine Red Claws (assistant)
- 2021–2024: Lakeland / Osceola Magic (assistant)

Career highlights
- Philadelphia Big 5 Hall of Fame Inductee (2022); French Pro A All-Star (2012); Atlantic 10 Player of the Year (2009); AP Honorable Mention All-American (2009); First-team All-Atlantic 10 (2009); Robert V. Geasey Trophy winner (2009)
- Stats at Basketball Reference

Ahmad Naadir Nivins (born February 10, 1987) is an American professional basketball coach and former player. He played college basketball for Saint Joseph's.

== Early life ==
Nivins attended County Prep High School in Jersey City, New Jersey, where he began as a baseball player before switching to basketball in his freshman year. In his junior year he transferred to St. Anthony High School, which is also in Jersey City. As a senior, he averaged 15 points, 10 rebounds and five blocks and helped the team to a 30–0 record and the school's ninth Tournament of Champions title in 2003–04.

== College career ==
Nivins attended Saint Joseph's University. He is the school's leader in career field goal percentage (63.4%) and also one of 26 Hawks to record 1,000 points and 500 rebounds in his career. Nivins is fifth on the team's all-time list with 110 blocks.

As a senior, he averaged a double-double (19.2 points, 11.8 rebounds) and nationally, he ranked fourth in rebounds per game behind John Bryant, Blake Griffin and Kenneth Faried.

Nivins was the 2009 Atlantic-10 Player of the Year and 2009 Big 5 Player of the Year.

In 2018, he was enshrined in the Saint Joseph's University Basketball Hall of Fame.

In 2022, Nivins was inducted into the Philadelphia Big 5 Hall of Fame.

== Professional career ==
After being selected by the Dallas Mavericks with the 56th overall pick of the 2009 NBA draft, on August 6, 2009, he signed for Bàsquet Manresa in the Spanish ACB.

On January 4, 2011, he signed with Belgian team Dexia Mons-Hainaut. On December 10, his draft rights were traded to the New York Knicks, along with the draft rights to Giorgos Printezis and Tyson Chandler in a three-way trade. The Mavericks received Andy Rautins from the Knicks and a second round pick from the Washington Wizards. The Wizards received Ronny Turiaf from the Knicks in addition to a Dallas 2012 second round pick, and 2013 Knicks second round pick, and cash considerations.

On August 20, 2012, Nivins moved to the French league, signing with Poitiers Basket 86 after averaging 10.4 points and 4.7 rebounds in 2011–12 in Belgium.

On June 21, 2013, Nivins signed with Élan Béarnais Pau-Orthez after averaging 14.4 points and 6.2 rebounds per game with Poitiers.

On June 3, 2014, Nivins signed with ASVEL Basket after averaging 15.5 points and 6.3 rebounds with Pau-Orthez.

On June 14, 2016, Nivins signed with Orléans Loiret Basket. On March 20, 2017, he parted ways with Orléans.

On November 11, 2017, Nivins signed with the Israeli team Hapoel Tel Aviv for the 2017–18 season. However, on November 17, 2017, Nivins was released by Hapoel before appearing in a game for them.

== College statistics ==
Year	Team	GP	GS	MPG	FG%	3P%	FT%	RPG	APG	SPG	BPG	PPG
2005–06	Saint Joseph's	30	12	22.7	.613	.000	.706	4.97	0.27	0.40	1.30	6.13
2006–07	Saint Joseph's	31	31	34.9	.630	.000	.678	7.58	0.35	1.03	1.03	16.65
2007–08	Saint Joseph's	33	33	33.7	.647	.000	.741	5.85	0.48	0.67	1.18	14.42
2008–09	Saint Joseph's	32	32	39.3	.612	.000	.787	11.81	1.00	0.81	1.75	19.16

== Personal life ==
Nivins majored in sociology. Nivins' father, Larry, played basketball at Slippery Rock University.

He currently resides in Central Florida with his partner and together they have 3 children.
