= High Tech High School =

Magnet high school in Hudson County, New Jersey, US

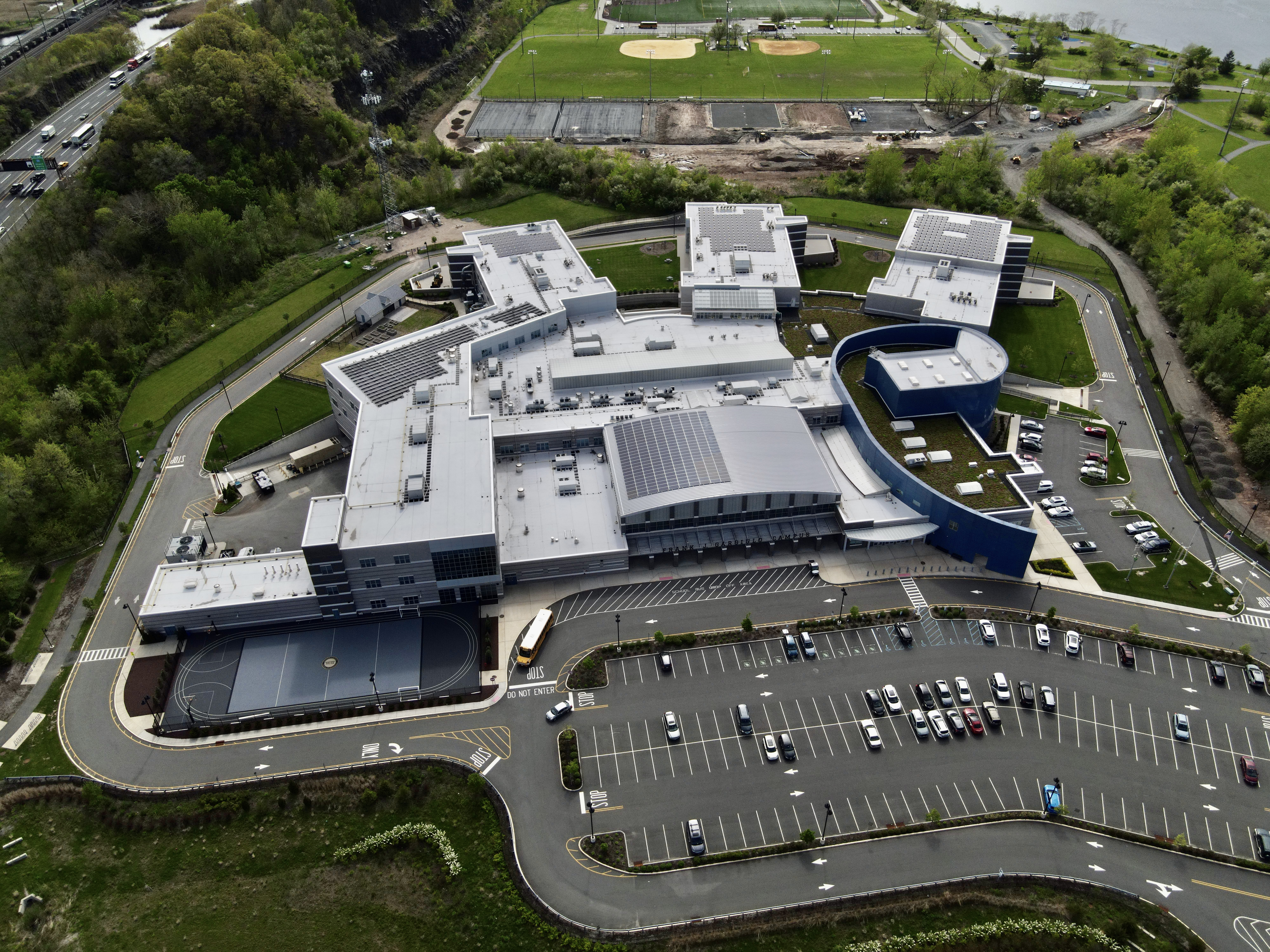
- An aerial picture of the High Tech High School building in May 2022

Location
- 1 High Tech Way; Secaucus, New Jersey, (Hudson County) 07094; United States; 40.7609°N 74.0834°W

Information
- Type: Magnet public high school
- Established: 1991
- NCES School ID: 340757002766
- Principal: Kathy Young
- Faculty: 91.1 FTEs
- Enrollment: 790 (as of 2024–25)
- Student to teacher ratio: 8.7:1
- Colors: Black and Gold
- Team name: Lazercats
- Website: hths.hcstonline.org

High Tech High School is a full-time public magnet high school serving students in ninth through twelfth grades in Secaucus, in Hudson County, in the U.S. state of New Jersey, operating as part of the Hudson County Schools of Technology. Since its establishment in 1991, High Tech High School has been named a Top Ten High School, a Governor's School of Excellence, a New Jersey Star School (twice) and has been cited by New Jersey Monthly magazine as one of the state's great public high schools. The school is noted for success in the sciences and in the performing arts, winning several awards in both fields.

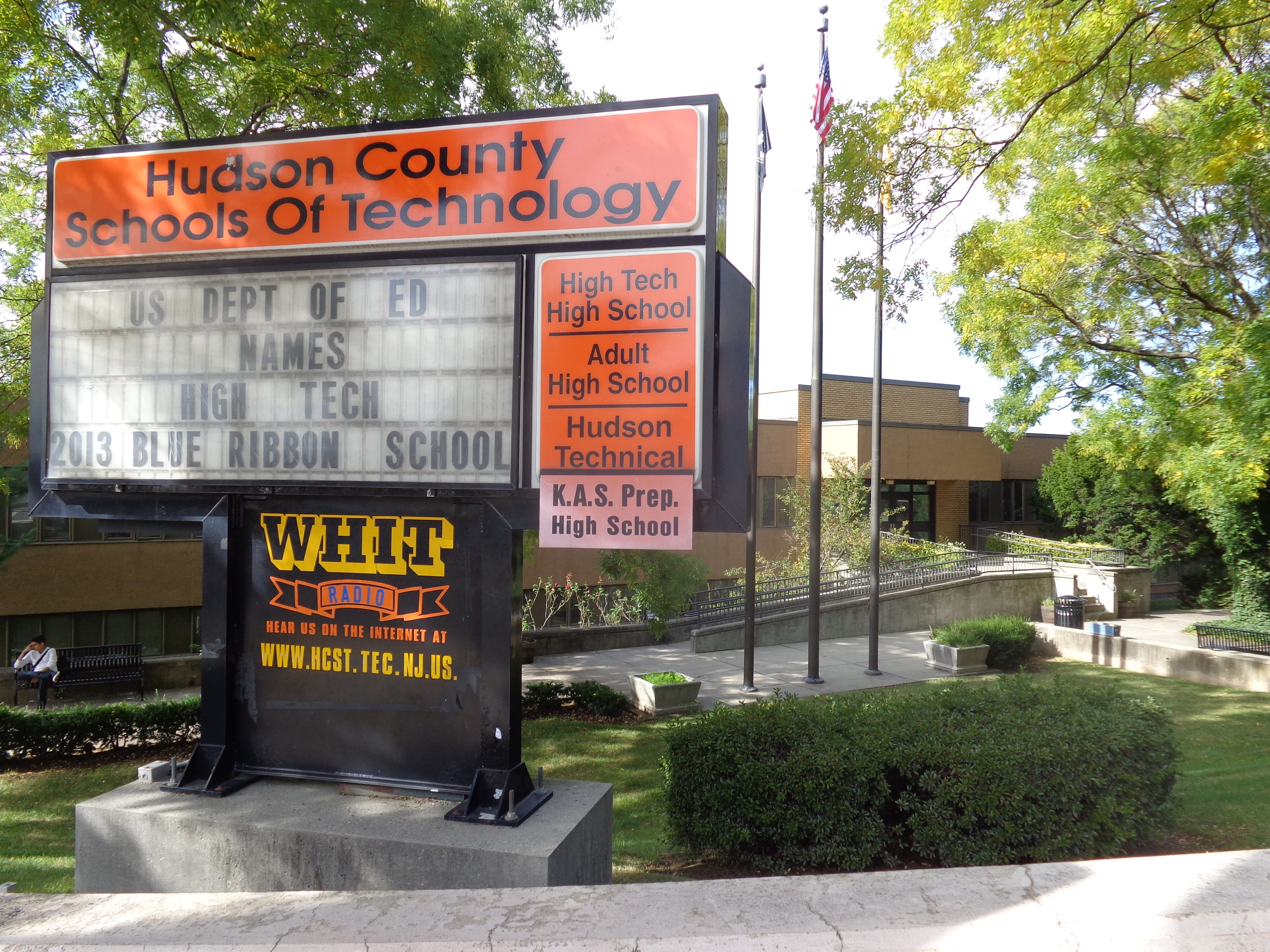
The exterior of the previous building in North Bergen

As of the 2024–25 school year, the school had an enrollment of 790 students and 91.1 classroom teachers (on an FTE basis), for a student–teacher ratio of 8.7:1. There were 222 students (28.1% of enrollment) eligible for free lunch and 64 (8.1% of students) eligible for reduced-cost lunch.

== History ==
High Tech High School was founded in 1991 by the Hudson County Schools of Technology school district to provide Hudson County residents with a quality public education in a technology-based environment, beginning with a class of 30 students when it opened. The school has grown to more than 1,000 students and has been able to maintain a student-to-faculty ratio of 12 to 1.

In September 2018, the school moved from its previous location in North Bergen to a newly built 350,000-square-foot (33,000 m^{2}) school building constructed at a cost of $160 million on a 22-acre (8.9 ha) site in Secaucus. The former building was sold to North Bergen school district to become the new home of North Bergen High School.

== Awards, recognition and rankings ==
Awards received by High Tech High School include:

- In May 2025, students from the school placed 1st in the nation for the high school eSports Super Smash Bros. Ultimate Crews, Solos, and Consolation bracket by, The Electronic Gaming Federation, earning a 3rd win respectively for the school. The Smash team has also won the Garden State eSports Smash Crews.
- In June 2024, students from the school placed 1st in the nation for the high school eSports Super Smash Bros. Ultimate Crews and Solos by, The Electronic Gaming Federation, earning a 2nd win respectively for the school.
- In November 2023, the school won the NBC "Star Choir" competition, and performed at the Rockefeller Center Christmas Tree lighting.
- In June 2023, students from the school placed 1st, 7th, and 14th in the nation for high school eSports Super Smash Bros. Ultimate by, The Electronic Gaming Federation.
- Business Insider, using data from the 2015 Niche rankings, ranked High Tech High School 21st on its 2014 list of the "25 best public high school in the United States".
- In September 2013, the school was one of 15 in New Jersey to be recognized by the United States Department of Education as part of the National Blue Ribbon Schools Program, an award called the "most prestigious honor in the United States' education system" and which Education Secretary Arne Duncan described as schools that "represent examples of educational excellence".
- In its 2013 report on "America's Best High Schools", The Daily Beast ranked the school 436th in the nation among participating public high schools and 36th among schools in New Jersey.
- Schooldigger.com ranked the school tied for 29th out of 381 public high schools statewide in its 2011 rankings (a decrease of 10 positions from the 2010 ranking) which were based on the combined percentage of students classified as proficient or above proficient on the mathematics (92.3%) and language arts literacy (100.0%) components of the High School Proficiency Assessment (HSPA).
- In the 2011 "Ranking America's High Schools" issue by The Washington Post, the school was ranked 49th in New Jersey and 1,516th nationwide.
- 2003 Governor's School of Excellence
- 2002 School Leader Award, NJ School Boards Association
- 2001 Best High School Musical, Director, Costumes - Paper Mill Playhouse
- 2000 2000 National Student Community Service Award - SkillsUSA
- 1999 100 Top Wired Schools in the US by FamilyPC Magazine
- 1998 New Jersey Star School by NJ Department of Education.
- 1997 Flagship School for Exemplary Video Journalism by Channel One
- 1996 Best Practices in World Languages by the New Jersey Department of Education
- 1995 New Jersey Star School by New Jersey Department of Education.
- 1995 10 Best Overall Schools in New Jersey by New Jersey Monthly Magazine
- 1994 Philanthropic Corporate Award by Panasonic, Matsushita
- 1993 Outstanding Program Award by NJASCD
- 1992 School Leadership Exemplary Program Award by NJSBA
- 1992 NJ State National Blue Ribbon Nominee, New Jersey Department of Education
- 1992 School Leader Award Competition, NJ School Boards' Association
- 1991 Model Parental Involvement Program Award by NJSBA

== Demographics ==
Hudson County is the smallest of New Jersey's 21 counties. Highly urbanized and densely populated, the 2000 census ranked this area as fourth in the nation on the ethnicity index. As a regional magnet school, High Tech draws on its diverse student population from the 12 towns and cities within the county. The average expenditure per student is $14,760 and is derived from federal, state, and county aid. High Tech High School is accredited by the New Jersey Department of Education. 43% of the student body is Hispanic, 32% is Caucasian, 16% is Asian/Pacific Islander, and 9% is African American.

== Sports ==
The High Tech Lasercats had competed in the Hudson County Interscholastic Athletic Association (HCIAA), which includes public and private high schools in Hudson County. The league operates under the supervision of the New Jersey State Interscholastic Athletic Association (NJSIAA).

High Tech had few sports teams, including girls' and boys' tennis, bowling, a judo club and basketball. Their best was their soccer team, which had a five-year run of county championships (2004-2008).

The girls' softball team won the 2008 North I, Group II state sectional championship, defeating Hoboken High School 3–1 in the tournament final. The team won the first round of the Group I state championship with a 4–2 win over Pompton Lakes High School 4–2, before falling to Pennsville Memorial High School by a score of 8–2 in the final game.

In March 2010, mayors from all 12 municipalities in Hudson County signed a petition stating that High Tech High School and County Prep High School should eliminate their sports programs because of budget cuts. On April 22, 2010; it was revealed in the new budget that sports were cut from both schools for the 2010–11 school year. The students attending High Tech High School at the time that the petition was signed (graduating classes 2010 to 2014) demonstrated their deep disapproval towards Hudson County's decision during the spring of 2010. Many seniors of the Class of 2010 risked their ability to graduate in order to participate in the walk-out that occurred.

== Majors ==
At High Tech, Juniors are required to have 80 minutes of a major per day, and Seniors are required to have 120 minutes (2 hours) of a major per day.

Majors include:

Design and Fabrication (DFAB)

- Architecture
- Industrial Design and Animation
- Computer-Aided Design and Analysis (CADA)
- Engineering Technology
- Wood Technology

Performing Arts

- Musical Theatre
- Dance Performance
- Dance Choreography
- Drama

Media & Visual Arts

- Interactive Media
- Broadcasting
- TV Production
- Graphic Design

Environmental Science

Culinary

== Student Council ==
The Student Council at High Tech is divided into four smaller student governments, one for each respective class. At the end of each school year (beginning of the year for the incoming-Freshman class), elections are held to determine the following year's class officers. The entire class votes, and a simple majority is required to win a position.

Each council consists of elected officials, including the President, Vice President, Secretary, and Treasurer. The President is responsible for organizing fundraisers and activities to be conducted by the student council. The Vice President is responsible for assisting the President in fulfilling any and all of their responsibilities, and verifying that class officers stay on task. The Secretary is responsible for logistics, record keeping, and internal affairs. The Treasurer is responsible for monitoring all financial activities by the council, and working with the Secretary to keep accurate and available records.

There are two general advisers of the overarching Student Council, and typically two advisers for each individual class government. There are also a number of student individuals appointed to the council, known as "Liaisons". These Liaisons are usually evenly distributed throughout academies and majors, and are responsible for delivering information to each of their assigned homerooms and helping execute successful council events and fundraisers.

== Notable alumni ==
- Kyla Garcia, stage, film, and television actress and audiobook narrator
- Baker Grace, musician and songwriter
