= Paola Santiago and the Forest of Nightmares =

2021 middle grade fantasy novel by Tehlor Kay Mejia

- Author: Tehlor Kay Mejia
- Genre: Middle grade fiction, fantasy, paranormal
- Publisher: Rick Riordan Presents
- Publication date: August 3, 2021
- ISBN: 9781368049344
- Preceded by: Paola Santiago and the River of Tears
- Followed by: Paola Santiago and the Sanctuary of Shadows

Paola Santiago and the Forest of Nightmares is a 2021 middle grade fantasy novel by Tehlor Kay Mejia. It is the second novel in the Paola Santiago series, preceded by Paola Santiago and the River of Tears (2020) and followed by Paola Santiago and the Sanctuary of Shadows (2022).

The series follows Paola Santiago, a space-obsessed nerd whose friend disappears after walking by a forbidden river. Paola, along with her other friend Dante, must venture there to find her, and meet the Niños de la Luz, a group of children who have gone missing.

== Plot ==
Paola Santiago is struggling with major changes in her personal life while also dealing with supernatural dangers. She reluctantly joins her mother, Maria, and her mother’s new boyfriend Aaron for a dinner date, where she feels increasingly uncomfortable and worries that her relationship with her mother is changing. She also notices that she and Emma have grown apart since their previous adventures. Meanwhile, Dante begins acting distant and angry toward Paola, eventually revealing that he is worried about his grandmother, Carmela. Paola discovers that Carmela has been behaving strangely, repeatedly calling her “Maria” and warning her about someone named Beto. Carmela eventually collapses and is taken to the hospital, where doctors discover that although her body is healthy, there is no brain activity. Paola becomes convinced that the strange events are connected to her father, César, and a mysterious connection between the names César and Beto. Believing that finding her father in Oregon could help save Carmela and explain what is happening, Paola decides to travel north, even though Emma warns her not to act without finding a logical explanation first.

At the hospital, supernatural creatures attack, confirming that Paola’s suspicions are not unfounded. Dante and Paola fight the spirits, and one of them specifically calls Paola by name and tells her to seek it out for answers. Dante reluctantly agrees to travel with Paola, but their friendship becomes increasingly strained. While they hide at the abandoned Niños de la Luz camp, Dante accuses Paola of causing his grandmother’s condition and putting everyone in danger. Paola feels that Dante is unfairly blaming her, especially because she has been trying to save him and his family. Naomi eventually finds them and agrees to help them travel north, although Dante distrusts her because of her past involvement with the Niños. During their journey through California, Paola encounters increasingly strange supernatural events, including a mysterious Hitchhiker, green lights, and terrifying cadejo. She also discovers that her magical abilities are developing, and she obtains her own Arma del Alma in the form of a magical spear. Her dreams become more disturbing and begin revealing connections between her father, Dante’s childhood, and La Llorona’s family. Eventually, Paola and Naomi reach the Niños, who are investigating a mysterious anomaly in Oregon. Paola realizes the anomaly may be connected to her father and the strange forces surrounding her.

The greatest revelation comes when Paola finally finds her father, who is living in a trailer filled with scientific equipment. At first, she believes she has finally found the person who can explain her dreams, but she soon discovers that her father has been manipulated and partially possessed by another supernatural being. He explains that Paola’s dreams are actually allowing her to travel through time and that she unknowingly traveled into the past to save Dante when he was a child. He also reveals that Carmela had used similar powers to travel through time and protect Dante. Most importantly, Paola learns that her father is connected to La Llorona as one of her sons and that another soul, Joaquín, has been using his body. Joaquín manipulated Dante and used him to lure Paola to Oregon because Paola’s bloodline gives her the power needed to open a supernatural void. Paola realizes that the strange anomaly the Niños were investigating is actually her father’s attempt to open this void. With Emma’s help, Paola manages to separate Joaquín from her father, although doing so nearly kills him. Instead of giving in to hatred, Paola forgives Joaquín after learning about the suffering he endured and helps him finally move on. Her father survives, but Dante has been trapped inside the void, leaving Paola determined to rescue him.

After the confrontation, Paola, Emma, her parents, Bruto, and the Niños return to Silver Springs. Maria ends her relationship with Aaron, showing that she is choosing to focus on rebuilding her family and supporting Paola. The Niños lose their original camp when the protective force field disappears, so they move into a warehouse, with Paola’s father providing his trailer as part of their new home. Carmela eventually recovers, allowing Paola and Emma to visit her and explain what happened to Dante. Although Carmela is devastated, she does not blame Paola for her grandson’s fate. The story ends with Paola separated from Dante but determined to bring him back from the void. Emma promises to help her, demonstrating that their friendship is beginning to heal after the distance between them earlier in the story. Paola is therefore left facing another dangerous journey: she has uncovered important truths about her family, her supernatural heritage, and her dreams, but she still has one major goal ahead of her—finding Dante and bringing him home.

== Reception ==
Kirkus Reviews highlighted how the novel "is peppered with conversations about and instances demonstrating the vulnerability of minority populations around police and in health care," providing examples of different characters' new connections to various social justice issues. Kirkus Reviews also said, "An interesting twist uplifts the ending of this second series entry".

Samantha Zaboski, writing for Shelf Awareness, noted, "Tehlor Kay Mejia impresses with this moving middle-grade fantasy deeply rooted in Mexican American culture. Her Latinx cast criticizes racism and police bias [...] while Mejia incorporates myth [...] and magic [...]. Pao's beautiful problem-solving mind and personal growth [...] shine, and her tension-relieving quips [...] temper heartbreaking moments." Zaboski concluded by saying, "Paola Santiago and the Forest of Nightmares is a satisfying follow-up, full of heart and humor that celebrates Mexican heritage, family and forgiveness."

Booklist also reviewed the novel and the audiobook.

== Television adaptation ==
A live action Disney+ series was announced on February 8, 2022.
