= Hudson County Schools of Technology =

Vocational district in Hudson County, New Jersey, US

Address
- 8511 Tonnelle Avenue North Bergen, Hudson County, New Jersey, 07047; United States
- Coordinates: 40.809848°N 74.014074°W

District information
- Grades: Vocational
- Superintendent: Thomas Macagnano
- Business administrator: Nicholas Fargo
- Schools: 6

Students and staff
- Enrollment: 2,332 (as of 2024–25)
- Faculty: 208.9 FTEs
- Student–teacher ratio: 11.2:1

Other information
- Website: www.hcstonline.org
| Ind. | Per pupil | District spending | Rank (*) | Vocational average | %± vs. average |
|---|---|---|---|---|---|
| 1A | Total Spending | $23,126 | 11 | $18,891 | 22.4% |
| 1 | Budgetary Cost | 15,890 | 8 | 17,296 | −8.1% |
| 2 | Classroom Instruction | 7,413 | 5 | 9,045 | −18.0% |
| 6 | Support Services | 2,304 | 14 | 2,269 | 1.5% |
| 8 | Administrative Cost | 1,976 | 8 | 2,353 | −16.0% |
| 10 | Operations & Maintenance | 2,472 | 6 | 3,014 | −18.0% |
| 13 | Extracurricular Activities | 230 | 7 | 464 | −50.4% |
| 16 | Median Teacher Salary | 61,630 | 12 | 65,035 |
Data from NJDoE 2014 Taxpayers' Guide to Education Spending. *Of Vocational districts with any number of students. Lowest spending=1; Highest=21

The Hudson County Schools of Technology is a public school district based in North Bergen that offers career and vocational education for public middle school and high school students in sixth through twelfth grades, and for adult students throughout Hudson County, in the U.S. state of New Jersey.

As of the 2024–25 school year, the district, comprised of six schools, had an enrollment of 2,332 students and 208.9 classroom teachers (on an FTE basis), for a student–teacher ratio of 11.2:1.

== Awards and recognition ==
In September 2013, High Tech High School was one of 15 in New Jersey to be recognized by the United States Department of Education as part of the National Blue Ribbon Schools Program, an award described by the superintendent of the Bergen County Technical Schools as the "most prestigious honor in the United States' education system". Education Secretary Arne Duncan described these schools as schools that "represent examples of educational excellence".

County Prep High School was one of nine schools in New Jersey honored in 2020 by the National Blue Ribbon Schools Program, which recognizes high student achievement.

High Tech High School was named as a "Star School" by the New Jersey Department of Education, the highest honor that a New Jersey school can achieve, in the 1994–95 school year.

== Schools ==
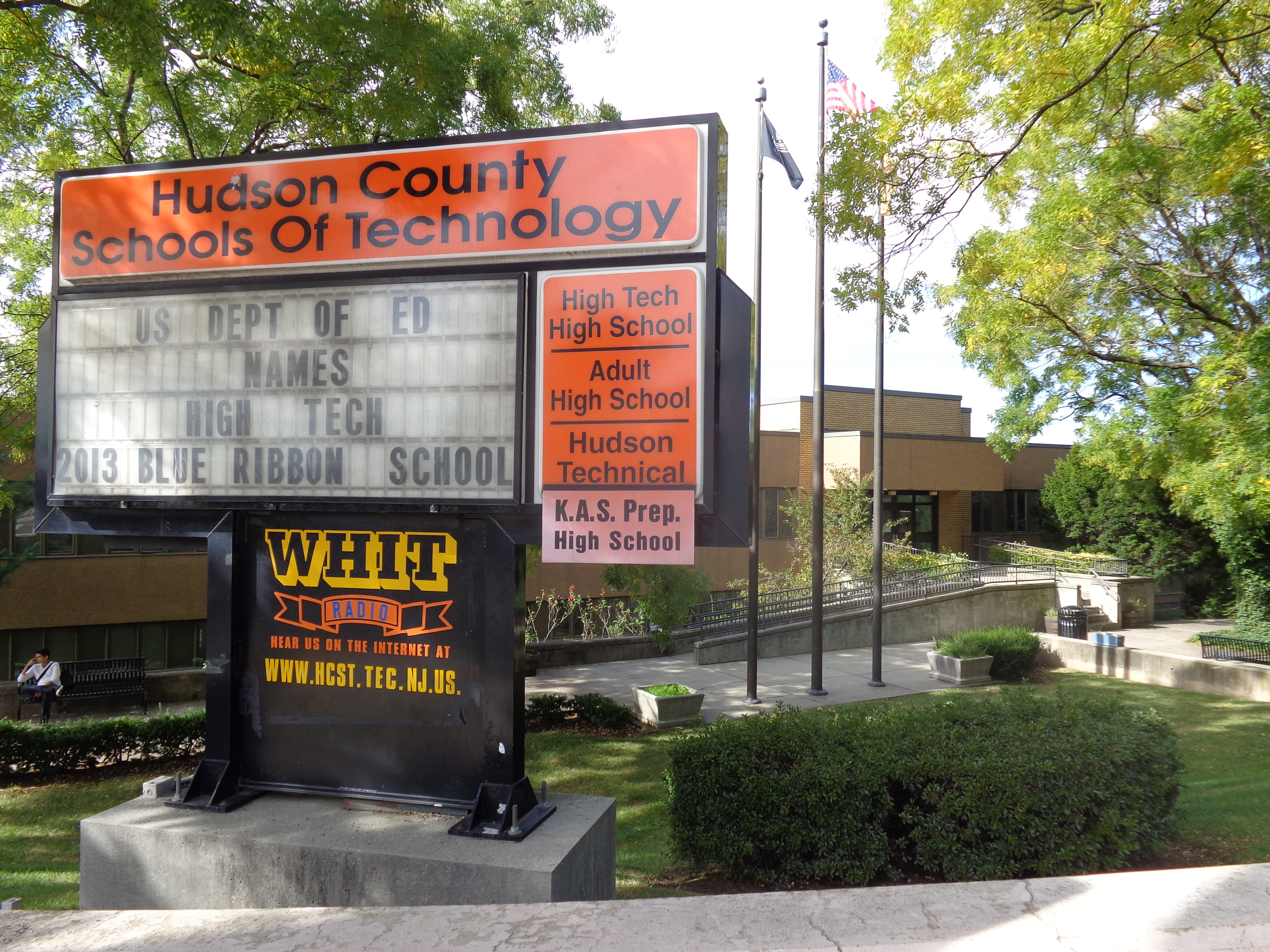
North Bergen campus

Programs administered by the Hudson County Schools of Technology (with 2024–25 enrollment data from the National Center for Education Statistics) include:

Middle school

- Explore Middle School located in Jersey City (163 students; grades 6–8)

High schools

- Academy of Career and Technical Education (246 students; grades 9–12)
- Academy of Technology Design located in Jersey City (235 students; in grades 9–12)
- Bayonne Academy located in North Bergen (NA; grades 9–12)
- County Prep High School located in Jersey City (892 students; grades 9–12)
- High Tech High School located in Secaucus, New Jersey (790 students; grades 9–12)

== Administration ==
Core members of the district's administration are:

- Thomas Macagnano, superintendent
- Nicholas Fargo, business administrator and board secretary

== Board of education ==
The district's board of education, comprised of nine members, sets policy and oversees the fiscal and educational operation of the district through its administration. As a Type I school district, the board's trustees are appointed to serve three-year terms of office on a staggered basis, with three seats up for appointment each year. The board appoints a superintendent to oversee the district's day-to-day operations and a business administrator to supervise the business functions of the district.
