= We Set the Dark on Fire =

2019 young adult fantasy novel by Tehlor Kay Mejia

- Author: Tehlor Kay Mejia
- Genre: Young adult fiction, dystopian, fantasy, romance
- Publisher: Katherine Tegen Books
- Publication date: February 26, 2019
- ISBN: 9780062691330
- Followed by: We Unleash the Merciless Storm

We Set the Dark on Fire is a 2019 young adult fantasy novel by Tehlor Kay Mejia.

== Plot ==
Daniela is a standout graduate of the Medio School for Girls, an institution dedicated to training girls to become future wives. Here, they are categorized into two distinct groups: Primeras, prized for their abilities as life-partners, and Segundas, who are valued primarily for their physical beauty and are expected to bear children. Daniela is selected as a Primera for the son of Medio's chief military strategist, a position her family has worked tirelessly to secure. However, hidden beneath her poised exterior is a well-guarded secret: she was born on the wrong side of the wall that divides Medio from the impoverished and marginalized population. She was smuggled across as a child, saved from exposure by a clandestine resistance group that now seeks to employ her as a spy on her new husband.

Daniela grapples with a profound internal conflict. On one hand, she yearns to secure a comfortable future for her family. On the other, she feels a growing conviction that spying for the resistance might be the morally just path to take. Her life becomes exponentially more complex when her former rival, Carmen, is designated as her Segunda. Despite their history of animosity, their relationship deepens into a forbidden love. As Daniela attempts to navigate these conflicting allegiances, she is confronted with difficult decisions about the sacrifices she's willing to make to safeguard her unexpected and illicit love.

== Reception ==
We Set the Dark on Fire was well received by critics, including starred reviews from Booklist, Kirkus Reviews, Publishers Weekly, and Shelf Awareness.

Reviewers praised the varied commentaries We Set the Dark on Fire offers. Booklist's Reagan said the novel provides an "incisive examination of power structures," as well as a "timely examination of how women move through the world" that is "potent and precise". Kirkus Reviews called the novel "thrilling and timely", noting that "power, truth, and lies intertwine dangerously" throughout the novel "that reflects themes in our own difficult world, namely privilege, immigration, and individualism versus the common good". Publishers Weekly called We Set the Dark on Fire "a complicated tale of love, intrigue, moral compromise, and action, with a prescient sensibility that echoes current headlines and political issues", as well as a "fierce, feminist novel". NPR's Caitlyn Paxson wrote, "We Set the Dark on Fire is a book so timely it hurts", noting that "Mejia manages to walk a very tight line in evoking some of the injustices that are currently happening in America without being heavy-handed".

Multiple reviewers highlighted how well-crafted the novel is. On behalf of Booklist, Maggie Reagan highlighted how "Mejia’s world is carefully built," calling We Set the Dark on Fire "a masterfully constructed novel". Kirkus Reviews also called the novel "well-crafted". Part of this crafting included the world-building, character development, and dialogue. Kirkus Reviews and Shelf Awareness both noted Mejia's "lush" descriptions. Clarissa Hadge, writing for Shelf Awareness, also highlighted the beauty of the "Latinx-inspired world featuring complex female characters". However, Kate Quealy-Gainer, writing for The Bulletin of the Center for Children's Books, said the "characters are lacking in depth".

School Library Journal's Selenia Paz called the novel "a must-have fantasy filled with action and political intrigue". Paz also noted that "readers will find themselves drawn to a richly constructed world full of fantasy and diversity, with a mystery that will keep them guessing until the very end."

Although We Set the Dark on Fire does not employ magical realism, NPR's Paxson compared the novel to "the work of Isabel Allende [...], especially The House of the Spirits". Paxson also compared the novel to The Handmaid's Tale, noting that "We Set the Dark on Fire is definitely written for young adults in a way that The Handmaid's Tale is not, resulting in a book that feels less cynical". Tor.com's Alex Brown also compared We Set the Dark on Fire to The Handmaid's Tale, as well as Nineteen Eighty-Four. Brown concluded their review by writing, "We Set the Dark on Fire is dystopian YA as you’ve only dreamed it could be. Tehlor Kay Mejia’s story is specific yet universal, intricate and vast; it’s fire and smoke and the phoenix rising from the ashes. This is a powerful, personal novel, and Mejia is a fierce writer with a sharp eye for subtlety."

The audiobook, narrated by Kyla Garcia, also received a starred review from Booklist, whose Terry Hong said, "Garcia establishes an immediate rhythm to her performance [...] She embodies Dani as resilient and grounded; Carmen wavering between shrewd and frivolous; and Mateo cold, close to threatening. She’s most affecting when revealing emotional vulnerabilities—a rewarding development that clearly demands a Garcia-articulated sequel to come."

== Awards and honors ==
In 2019, Booklist included We Set the Dark on Fire on their "Booklist Editors' Choice: Youth Audio", "Booklist Editors' Choice: Books for Youth," and "Top 10 SF/Fantasy & Horror Audiobooks for Youth" lists. It was also a 2019 Tor.com Reviewers' Choice selection and was included on their list of the year's best science fiction, fantasy and horror novels.

The following year, the American Library Association selected it for their Amazing Audiobooks for Young Adults, Best Fiction for Young Adults, ALA Rainbow Book List, and Rise: A Feminist Book Project lists.

We Set the Dark on Fire was also shortlisted for the Neukom Institute's 2020 Literary Arts Award for Debut.
