= Lucha of the Night Forest =

2023 young adult fantasy novel by Tehlor Kay Mejia

- Author: Tehlor Kay Mejia
- Publisher: Make Me A World
- Publication date: March 21, 2023
- ISBN: 9780593378366

Lucha of the Night Forest is a 2023 young adult fantasy novel by Tehlor Kay Mejia.

== Reception ==
Lucha of the Night Forest was well received by critics, including a starred review from Shelf Awareness, whose Samantha Zaboski called the novel "immersive and lush". Zaboski praised the novel's plotting, as well as the "exquisite examination of power structures [...] and unhealthy family dynamics".

Kirkus Reviews called the novel "spellbinding", noting that it "features the author’s hallmark lush prose and rich fantasy trappings as it tells a captivating story in a Latin American–coded world. While some elements of the worldbuilding could have been more fully fleshed out, this story is inspiring and empowering, existing in the intersections between destiny and choice, history and myth, with strong roots in family bonds as well as a budding queer romance between Lucha and Paz."

Booklist's Allie Stevens called the novel "thought provoking and immersive", referring to the novel's setting "lushly described, dark, [and] gritty" and the plot "adventurous" and "fast-paced".

Publishers Weekly wrote, "Lyrical prose and fiercely characterized protagonists make up the heart of this propulsive fantasy adventure." They mentioned that the worldbuilding is limited, and the pacing is uneven, though this is "balanced out by high stakes, a lushly described Latin America–inspired setting teeming with dark atmospherics, and an unforgettable queer romance."

Tor.com's Alex Brown noted that Lucha of the Night Forest is "heavy" with "death, murder, drug addiction, child abuse, implied sexual assault, child abandonment, and, um, fungus consuming people alive." This breadth of heavy themes results in some complications, according to Brown: "Structurally, there’s a little too much plot happening a little too quickly. The story jumps around from trope to trope, all-encompassing subplot to all-encompassing subplot. The plot wasn’t difficult to follow; if the point was to leave the reader on edge then Mejia succeeded. The worldbuilding and magic system were fascinating and well-done, although a few aspects could have been fleshed out more given their importance to the story." Despite this, Brown said, "Hope runs through this novel."

School Library Journal also reviewed the novel.
