= Paola Santiago and the River of Tears =

2020 middle grade fantasy novel by Tehlor Kay Mejia

- Author: Tehlor Kay Mejia
- Genre: Middle grade fiction, fantasy, paranormal
- Publisher: Rick Riordan Presents
- Publication date: August 4, 2020
- ISBN: 9781368049177
- OCLC: 1119979671
- Followed by: Paola Santiago and the Forest of Nightmares

Paola Santiago and the River of Tears is a 2020 middle grade fantasy novel by Tehlor Kay Mejia. It is the first novel in the Paola Santiago series, followed by Paola Santiago and the Forest of Nightmares (2021) and Paola Santiago and the Sanctuary of Shadows (2022).

The series follows Paola Santiago, a space-obsessed nerd whose friend disappears after walking by a forbidden river. Paola, along with her other friend Dante, must venture there to find her, and meet the Niños de la Luz, a group of children who have gone missing.

== Plot ==
Paola Santiago spends time with her friends, Emma Lockwood and Dante Mata, near the Gila River in Silver Springs, Arizona. The river is associated with tragedy because their former classmate Marisa Martínez disappeared the previous year and presumably drowned there, leading to a strict curfew. That night, Paola has a disturbing version of a recurring dream in which a mysterious hand with purple nails and a ruby ring pulls her underwater. Soon afterward, Emma disappears while she and Paola are supposed to meet at the river, and the police initially dismiss Paola and Dante’s concerns because of their belief in supernatural explanations. Paola begins having dreams that seem to predict events, including Emma’s disappearance and the kidnappings occurring nearby. With the help of Dante’s grandmother, Carmela, who understands supernatural forces, Paola learns that she is a “dreamer” and that something dangerous is specifically targeting her. Carmela gives Paola and Dante magical objects and warns them that they have only a few days before the Summer Solstice, when the boundary between the human world and a supernatural realm called the Rift will become especially weak.

As Paola and Dante investigate, they encounter dangerous creatures and eventually meet the Niños de la Luz, a group of young people who protect their community from monsters emerging from the Rift. Led by Marisa, who Paola believed was dead, the group explains that supernatural creatures called ahogadas can drag children into the river and that the upcoming alignment of the Summer Solstice and the third-quarter moon will make the supernatural threat much stronger. Paola discovers that Marisa was once a student at her school but has lost many of her memories after becoming the leader of the Niños. She also learns that the previous leader, Franco, disappeared while attempting to enter the Rift and destroy the dark forces within it. Although Paola initially distrusts the Niños because they collect jewelry from girls who have been taken by the ahogadas, she eventually agrees to stay and fight alongside them because they may be able to help her rescue Emma. During an attack on the camp by supernatural creatures, Paola discovers that her father’s old toy flashlight is actually a powerful magical key. Its light can repel evil, but using it drains her life force, leaving a white streak in her hair. When Dante is captured and the Niños attempt to keep the flashlight from her, Paola escapes with help from Sal, a younger member of the group, and decides to enter the Rift herself to rescue her friends.

Inside the Rift, Paola encounters even more terrifying creatures and eventually reunites with Dante. She also learns the truth about Ondina, the mysterious girl who has appeared repeatedly in her dreams. Ondina is actually the daughter of La Llorona, the supernatural figure responsible for kidnapping children and attempting to restore her own dead children to life. La Llorona has captured Emma, Dante, and Franco because she needs their souls for her resurrection ritual, but Paola’s powerful emotions make her the ideal person to use in the ritual. Paola confronts La Llorona and discovers that the weeping woman’s tragedy began when she drowned her own children, believing she was saving them from a life of suffering and shame. Ondina eventually turns against her mother and tries to stop the ritual. With the help of Bruto, a young chupacabra that becomes Paola’s companion, Paola fights to save her friends and destroy the source of La Llorona’s power. She ultimately chooses her friends and family over a vision of a successful future for herself, demonstrating her courage and willingness to sacrifice. The magical orb powering La Llorona becomes useless, and after Ondina convinces her mother to finally let go, La Llorona and Ondina pass on, causing the Rift to begin collapsing.

After escaping the collapsing Rift, Paola, Emma, Dante, and Franco return to the surface of the Gila River. Emma explains that she had actually met Ondina before her disappearance and had been pulled into the river while showing her their secret meeting place. Franco is welcomed back by the Niños de la Luz, while Paola realizes that many mysteries remain, especially concerning Carmela’s connection to the organization. Carmela reveals that she was once a leader of the Niños and warns that what happened is only the beginning. Paola and Emma are reunited with their mothers, and Paola is allowed to keep Bruto, who has become her loyal companion. Their families create a cover story to explain their disappearance, and the three friends are kept home for several days before being allowed to reunite. At the end, they watch a SpaceX launch together, but the news reminds them that other children, including Naomi and Marisa, are still missing. Paola lights a candle for them while holding Emma and sitting beside Dante, reflecting on everything that happened and realizing that her future will likely involve more supernatural challenges.

== Reception ==
Paola Santiago and the River of Tears was well-received by critics, including starred reviews from Booklist, Kirkus Reviews, Publishers Weekly, and School Library Journal.

Booklist's Selenia Paz wrote, "This fast-paced journey into Latinx folklore, with its clever protagonist, is sure to keep readers turning pages into the night."

Kirkus said the novel is a "fantastic and fantastical debut," writing, "Mejia’s writing is fast-paced and engaging, as the colorful imagery places readers in Southwestern cacti fields and in the tumultuous mindset of an insecure 12-year-old. For all its exploration of Pao’s internal landscape, there is action aplenty".

Multiple reviewers commented on Mejia's inclusion of "realistic plot points" in this fantastical novel, including "socioeconomic and immigration concerns, the tension between science and superstition".

Publishers Weekly also highlighted how the author "draws upon [their] Latinx heritage to conjure creatures from folklore, such as chupacabras, La Llorona", "wailing ghost woman, and other dark creatures". Shelf Awareness's Shelley Diaz also praised how Mejia "adeptly showcases [...] details about Mexican American culture".

Reviewers also mentioned the novel's character development. Publishers Weekly wrote, "Complicated emotional development is a particular strength—Paola wrestles with issues of anger and forgiveness, mother-daughter strife, and the new 'boy-girl weirdness' between her and Dante en route to becoming a reluctant hero". Shelley Diaz, writing for Shelf Awareness, noted how Paola helped "[imbue the] middle-grade debut with vulnerability and fierceness".

Diaz also commented on how "clever chapter headings add humor in between harrowing scenes, and duplicitous characters will keep readers guessing whom to trust".

== Television adaptation ==
A live action Disney+ series was announced on February 8, 2022.
