= Acoustic Dreams =

EP by Echosmith
- Released: June 10, 2014
- Genre: Indie pop, indie rock
- Length: 20:12
- Label: Warner Bros.
- Producer: Jeffery David

Echosmith chronology
Talking Dreams (2013)	Acoustic Dreams (2014)	Spotify Sessions (2015)

Professional ratings
Review scores
Source	Rating
AllMusic	3.5/5 stars

Acoustic Dreams is the second extended play by indie pop band Echosmith released June 10, 2014, on LP, CD, and digital download. It includes acoustic versions of four tracks from Talking Dreams, as well as one exclusive track, "Terminal."

== Reception ==
Tina Roumelioti of Buzznet gave the EP a positive review, saying, "My only wish is that this album were longer, but good things come in small packages. Take a moment out of your day to pick up Acoustic Dreams, lie on your bedroom floor with a pair of headphones and start dreaming."

Matt Collar of AllMusic gave a brief, indifferent review, noting, "...Acoustic Dreams, finds the California-based pop/rock outfit taking several tracks from its 2013 full-length album, Talking Dreams, and reworking them in an acoustic style. Featured here are such Echosmith fan favorites as "Let's Love," "Cool Kids," "Tell Her You Love Her," and "Talking Dreams." Also included is one new, never-before-released cut, "Terminal.""

Music blog It's All Dead, in a review of the album's vinyl LP release, noted, "Overall, Acoustic Dreams is a great collection of songs, but the label did the band no favors with the release’s lack of extras. Regardless, it’s a fun release for fans of the band..."

== Format availability ==
While given a standard wide release on vinyl LP and digital download, the CD version was only available for purchase on Warped Tour 2014.

== Track listing ==
All tracks were written by Jeffery David and Echosmith, except where noted.

No.	Title	Writer(s)	Length
1.	"Let's Love (Acoustic)"	Echosmith; Jeffery David	3:19
2.	"Cool Kids (Acoustic)"	Echosmith; Jeffery David; Jesiah Dzwonek	3:56
3.	"Tell Her You Love Her (Acoustic)"	Echosmith; Jeffery David	4:19
4.	"Talking Dreams (Acoustic)"	Echosmith; Jeffery David	2:58
5.	"Terminal (Acoustic)"	Echosmith; Jeffery David	5:40
Total length:			20:12

== Personnel ==
=== Echosmith ===
- Sydney Sierota – Lead vocals, guitar
- Noah Sierota – Bass guitar, vocals
- Jamie Sierota – Lead guitar, vocals
- Graham Sieorta – Drums

=== Additional musicians ===
- John Catchings - Cello

== Charts ==
Chart (2014)	Peak position
US Heatseekers Albums (Billboard)	34
