= New Jersey Core Curriculum Content Standards =

The New Jersey Core Curriculum Content Standards were created by the New Jersey State Board of Education in 1996 as the framework for education in New Jersey's public schools and clearly define what all students should know and be able to accomplish at the end of thirteen years of public education. Each subject is broken down for each of the grade levels. These subjects include visual and performing arts, comprehensive health and physical education, language arts literacy, mathematics, science, social studies, world languages, technological literacy, and career education and consumer, family, and life skills.

The standards are updated and revised as necessary every five years. In 2016, the Core Curriculum Content Standards were combined with a revised version of the Common Core State Standards and renamed the New Jersey Student Learning Standards.

== Sources ==
- https://www.state.nj.us/education/cccs/
