= Over My Head (Echosmith song) =

Single by Echosmith
- Released: March 16, 2018
- Genre: Synth-pop
- Length: 3:28
- Label: Warner Bros.
- Songwriter(s): Leroy Clampitt; Jeffery David; Cara Salimando; Paul Guy Shelton; Graham Sierota; Noah Sierota; Sydney Sierota
- Producer(s): Big Taste

Echosmith singles chronology
"Let's Love" (2015)	"Over My Head" (2018)	"Favorite Sound" (2019)

Music video
- "Over My Head" on YouTube

"Over My Head" is a song recorded by American indie pop band Echosmith. The Sierota siblings co-wrote the song with Leroy Clampitt, Jeffrey David, Cara Salimando, and Paul Guy Shelton. Following the release of the EP Inside a Dream, "Over My Head" was released digitally on March 16, 2018, through Warner Bros. Records as the intended lead single of the band's second studio album, however it was eventually scrapped from the album. It impacted hot adult contemporary radio on March 19, 2018.

== Composition ==
"Over My Head" is composed of a synth-heavy chorus, an "addicting" melody, and a pronounced drum beat. Critics noted the song's sound is more "evolved" and mature than previous releases.

The song is written in the key of F♯ minor, and follows a chord progression of D-Bm-F♯m (VI-iv-i). The tempo of the song is 105 beats per minute.

== Critical reception ==
Markos Papadatos of Digital Journal wrote that the song is delightful and "displays [the band's] growth and maturity." He gave the song an A rating.

== Chart performance ==
"Over My Head" entered the Billboard Adult Pop Songs chart dated April 7, 2018 at number 35 and was the week's highest-debuting single.

== Music video ==
A lyric video premiered accompanying the song's digital release on March 16, 2018. A collaboration with latte artist Melannie Aquino and Lavazza, the clip features the song's lyrics depicted in espresso foam.

The official music video for the song was directed by Sophia Muller and premiered March 20, 2018. The video features the black turtleneck outfits worn on the single cover and the block letter lights spelling Echosmith that the band use on tour.

== Credits and personnel ==
Adapted from single credits on AllMusic.

Echosmith

- Graham Sierota – drums
- Noah Sierota – bass, guitar, programming, vocals
- Sydney Sierota – vocals

Other personnel

- Sergio Chavez – engineering
- Todd Copper – engineering
- Chris Gehringer – mastering
- Serban Ghenea – mixing
- John Hanes – mix engineering
- Cara Salimando – backing vocals
- Paul "Phamous" Guy Shelton – backing vocals
- Leroy Clampitt – drum programming, engineering, production, synthesizer programming, backing vocals

== Charts ==
Chart (2018)	Peak position
US Adult Pop Airplay (Billboard)	23
US Pop Airplay (Billboard)	40

== Release history ==
Country	Date	Format	Label	Ref.
Worldwide	March 16, 2018	Digital download	Parlophone; Warner Bros.	
United States	March 19, 2018	Hot adult contemporary	Warner Bros.	
United States	March 20, 2018	Contemporary hit radio	Warner Bros.	
