= Baker Grace =

American singer

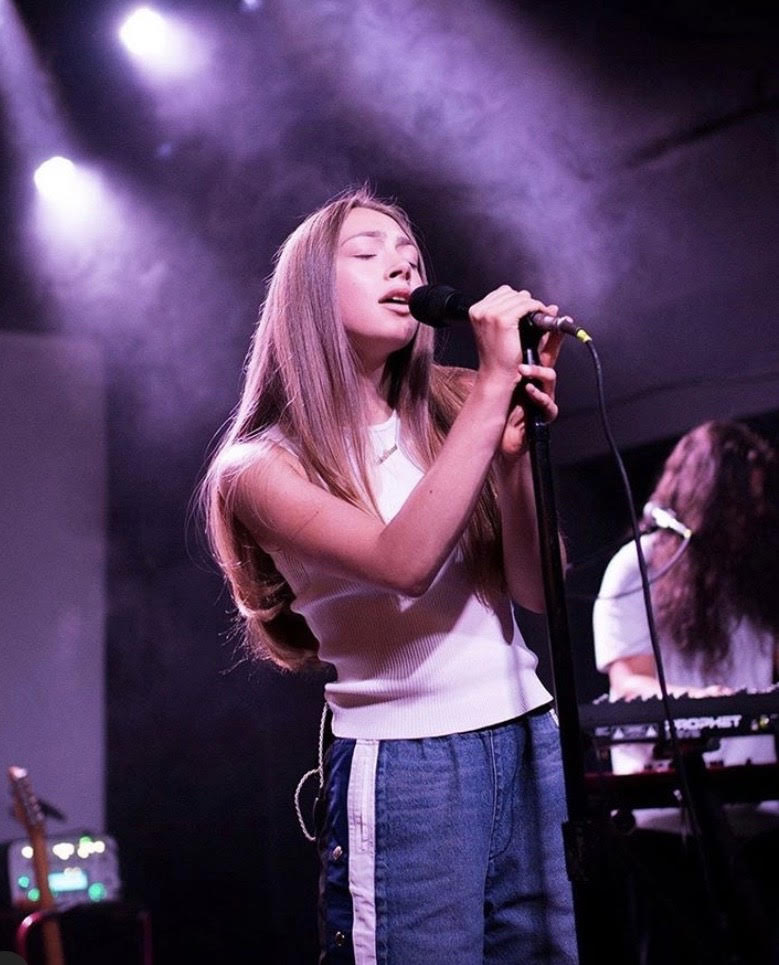

Background information
- Born: Chloe Baker; Weehawken, New Jersey, U.S.
- Occupation: Singer

Chloe Baker, also known as Baker Grace, is an American musician and songwriter.

== Early life and education ==
Baker Grace grew up in Weehawken, New Jersey, where she learned as a child to sing in part because of her musician father, producer and multi-instrumentalist Michael Baker. She also learned piano, guitar and songwriting. She attended High Tech High School in North Bergen, New Jersey, where she studied musical theater.

== Career ==
Grace released an album in 2015 titled Bitter’s Kiss, which she recorded in 2014 in her father's recording studio. After the release of the eight-track album, producer Scott Harris picked her up, after which Grace created “Am I Talking to You?” and “Day I Die” for Republic Records.

Her debut EP Girl, I Know was released in 2019. She collaborated with producers Dan Nigro and Andy Seltzer. This EP featured the track “Wrong Kind of People,” which received praise from Clash for being emotional and “striking.” She also created the EP Yourz Truly, which takes inspiration from letter writing. She wrote all of the songs on Yourz Truly. Other individuals involved in the production of Yourz Truly include musician Cautious Clay and producers Stefan Accardo and Scott Effman. Grace stated that she wished to tie the release of Yourz Truly into her charity work. She collaborated with producer Ayokay on the single "Too Young."
