= Christodora =

2016 novel by Tim Murphy

First edition

Christodora is a novel by New York City–based journalist Tim Murphy, first published on August 2, 2016 by Grove Press.

== Plot ==
In Christodora, Tim Murphy tells the story of diverse characters living in an iconic building in Manhattan's East Village, the Christodora.

Milly and Jared, with their adopted son Mateo, live unexpected experiences with their neighbor Hector, a former AIDS activist and a current addict.

There are radical changes that occur in their personal lives and community: first, the 2000s hipsters rising after the 1980s junkies and protesters, then the emergence of the wealthy residents of the 2020s.

This time-travelling novel illustrates the human experiences behind AIDS and puts the destructive power of hard drugs under the spotlight.

== Tim Murphy ==
Tim Murphy is a journalist, who for two decades worked on reporting LGBT-related topics (culture, politics, movements) through his publication in several magazines such as POZ Magazine (as an editor and staff writer), Out, The Advocate, and New York Magazine.

He got nominated for GLAAD Media Award for Outstanding Magazine Journalism for his coverage on the HIV-prevention pill regimen PrEP.

He is also a contributor in The New York Times and Condé Nast Traveler.

He lives in Brooklyn and the Hudson Valley.

== Awards ==
- 2017 : Andrew Carnegie Medal Nominee for Fiction

== TV adaptation ==
Paramount Television has optioned the novel for a limited TV series. Ira Sachs and Mauricio Zacharias will write the adaptation, with Sachs to direct. It will be produced by Cary Fukunaga with his production company Parliament of Owls.
