= Tehlor Kay Mejia =

American author

- Writing career
- Notable works: We Set the Dark on Fire (2019); We Unleash the Merciless Storm (2020); Miss Meteor (2020); Paola Santiago and the River of Tears (2020); Paola Santiago and the Forest of Nightmares (2021); Lucha of the Night Forest (2023)
- Website: tehlorkaymejia.com

Tehlor Kay Mejia is an American author. He is best known for his novels We Set the Dark on Fire (2019), We Unleash the Merciless Storm (2020), Miss Meteor (2020), and Lucha of the Night Forest (2023).

== Personal life ==
Mejia is a third-generation Mexican-American and grew up in Oregon. He did not attend post-secondary education.

Mejia was previously married and has a child. He lives in Oregon with his partner and child. Mejia is queer, Latinx, and transgender.

== Themes ==
Mejia's books often include Latinx and queer representation. He has indicated in interviews that this is because he did not see or read books about people like himself growing up. In a 2021 interview with Disney, Mejia said,

Not to be dramatic, but I feel like representation can literally be life or death. When we don’t have representation, it is so much easier to dehumanize people who are different from us because we don’t see them as real, complex, nuanced people. For so long, we’ve been seeing these two-dimensional, stereotypical forms of representation for marginalized communities, if we see them at all. This actually makes it harder for people to believe in themselves, and for people outside those cultures to see them as uniquely human. This can lead to issues like crisis of confidence or inequality and can even lead to violence being perpetrated in those communities. On top of that, being able to see yourself as the hero of a story is an experience that every kid deserves.

== Awards and honors ==
=== We Set the Dark on Fire ===
In 2019, Booklist included We Set the Dark on Fire on their "Booklist Editors' Choice: Youth Audio" and "Top 10 SF/Fantasy & Horror Audiobooks for Youth" lists. It was also a 2019 Tor.com Reviewers' Choice selection and was included on their list of the year's best science fiction, fantasy and horror novels.

The following year, the American Library Association selected it for their Amazing Audiobooks for Young Adults, Best Fiction for Young Adults, Rainbow List, and Rise: A Feminist Book Project lists.

We Set the Dark on Fire was also shortlisted for the Neukom Institute's 2020 Literary Arts Award for Debut.

=== Miss Meteor ===
In 2020, Miss Meteor was a Tor.com Reviewers’ Choice book and was included on their "Best Young Adult Science Fiction, Fantasy, and Horror of 2020" list.

The American Library Association included it on their 2021 Rainbow List and their list of the "Best Fiction for Young Adults."

== Publications ==
=== Adult novels ===
- Sammy Espinoza's Last Review. Dell Publishing. 2023. ISBN 9780593598771.
- Cash Delgado is Living the Dream. Dell Publishing. 2024. ISBN 978-0-593-59879-5.

=== Middle grade novels ===
- The Witch's Wings and Other Terrifying Tales. Illus. by Junyi Wu, Alexis Hernandez, Justin Hernandez, and Kaylee Rowena. Amulet Books. 2023. ISBN 9781419763564.
- It Happened to Anna. Delacorte Press. 2024. ISBN 978-0-593-64703-5

==== Paola Santiago series ====
- Paola Santiago and the River of Tears. Rick Riordan Presents. 2020. ISBN 9781368049177.
- Paola Santiago and the Forest of Nightmares. Rick Riordan Presents. 2021. ISBN 9781368049344.
- Paola Santiago and the Sanctuary of Shadows. Rick Riordan Presents. 2022. ISBN 9781368076876.

=== Young adult novels ===
- Lucha of the Night Forest. Make Me A World. 2023. ISBN 9780593378366.
- McLemore, Anna-Marie (2020). Miss Meteor. HarperTeen. ISBN 9780062869913.

==== We Set the Dark on Fire series ====
- We Set the Dark on Fire. Katherine Tegen Books. 2019. ISBN 9780062691316.
- We Unleash the Merciless Storm. Katherine Tegen Books. 2020. ISBN 9780062691347.

=== Anthology contributions ===
- Mitchell, Saundra, ed. (2018). All Out: The No-Longer-Secret Stories of Queer Teens throughout the Ages. Harlequin Teen. ISBN 9781335470454.
- Spotswood, Jessica; Sharpe, Tess, eds. (2018). "Starsong". Toil & Trouble: 15 Tales of Women & Witchcraft. Harlequin Teen. ISBN 9781335016270.
- The Cursed Carnival and Other Calamities: New Stories about Mythic Heroes. Rick Riordan Presents. 2021. ISBN 9781368070836.
- davis, g. haron; Montgomery, Cam; White, Adrianne, eds. (2022). "Doublespeak". All Signs Point to Yes. Inkyard Press. ISBN 9781335418623.
- Alkaf, Hanna; Owen, Margaret, eds. (2023). "3:00 P.M.: Delores 'Lola' Cortez". The Grimoire of Grave Fates. Delacorte Press. ISBN 9780593427453.
