= Bright (song) =

Single by Echosmith

from the album Talking Dreams
- Released: 2 February 2015
- Recorded: 2013
- Genre: Folk-pop
- Length: 3:42
- Label: Warner Bros.
- Songwriter(s): Sydney Sierota; Noah Sierota; Graham Sierota; Jamie Sierota; Jeffery David; Maureen McDonald
- Producer(s): Mike Elizondo

Echosmith singles chronology
"Cool Kids" (2014)	"Bright" (2015)	"Let's Love" (2015)

Music video
- "Bright" on YouTube

"Bright" is a song by American indie pop band Echosmith. It was released to American radio on February 2, 2015 by Warner Bros. Records as the second single from their debut studio album, Talking Dreams (2013). The song became the group's second top 40 hit on the Billboard Hot 100 and their second top-ten hit on the Adult Top 40 chart.

== Composition ==
"Bright" is written in the key of G♭ Major, and follows a chord progression of Gb-E♭m-Cb-Db (I-vi-IV-V). The tempo of the song is 90 beats per minute.

== Music video ==
A music video to accompany the release of "Bright" was first released onto YouTube on February 12, 2015 at a total length of three minutes and 37 seconds. Sydney, Jamie, Noah and Graham are shown packing up for a camping trip. They arrived to see their friends and hiked up to their campsite. The group is excited to see the night sky. Nearing the end, at nightfall, they hiked up to see a meteor shower. The video ends with the word "bright" being shown as a constellation.

== Track listing ==
Digital download
No.	Title	Length
1.	"Bright"	3:41

== Charts and certifications ==
=== Weekly charts ===
Chart (2015)	Peak position
Belgium (Ultratip Bubbling Under Flanders)	17
Belgium (Ultratip Bubbling Under Wallonia)	24
Canada (Canadian Hot 100)	81
Canada AC (Billboard)	39
Canada Hot AC (Billboard)	38
US Billboard Hot 100	40
US Adult Contemporary (Billboard)	16
US Adult Pop Airplay (Billboard)	9
US Pop Airplay (Billboard)	16

=== Year-end charts ===
Chart (2015)	Position
US Adult Contemporary (Billboard)	41
US Adult Top 40 (Billboard)	31

=== Certifications ===
Region	Certification	Certified units/sales
United States (RIAA)	Platinum	1,000,000^{‡}
^{‡} Sales+streaming figures based on certification alone.

== Release history ==
Region	Date	Format	Label
United States	February 2, 2015	Hot adult contemporary	Warner Bros.
United States	February 2, 2015	Adult album alternative	Warner Bros.
United States	February 3, 2015	Contemporary hit radio	Warner Bros.
