= Kyla Garcia =

American actress

Kyla Tucaya Garcia is an American stage, film, and television actress and audiobook narrator. As an audiobook narrator, she has received 14 Earphone Awards and has been a finalist for four Audie Awards.

== Biography ==
Garcia was born and raised in Hoboken, New Jersey and attended High Tech High School. She began acting at age 8 and at age 15, played Dorothy in an Off-Broadway production of Oz: A Twisted Musical. Shortly after, she began attending Mason Gross School of the Arts. She received a Bachelor of Fine Arts degree from Rutgers University.

As of 2022, Garcia lives in Los Angeles.

== Awards and honors ==
=== Awards ===
Year	Title	Award/Honor	Result	Ref.
2015	Gabi, A Girl in Pieces by Isabel Quintero	Earphone Award	Winner	
2015	The Mare by Mary Gaitskill	Earphone Award	Winner	
2016	Christodora by Tim Murphy	Earphone Award	Winner	
2016	Gabi, A Girl in Pieces by Isabel Quintero	Amazing Audiobooks for Young Adults	Top 10	
2016	A Manual for Cleaning Women: Selected Stories, edited by Lucia Berlin and Stephen Emerson	Earphone Award	Winner	
2018	Hope Nation (2018), edited by Rose Brock	Earphone Award	Winner	
2018	Love Sugar Magic: A Dash of Trouble by Anna Meriano	Earphone Award	Winner	
2018	Puddin' by Julie Murphy	Earphone Award	Winner	
2018	Refugee by Alan Gratz	Audie Award for Middle Grade Title	Finalist	
2019	Sabrina & Corina: Stories by Kali Fajardo-Anstine	Earphone Award	Winner	
2019	Suggested Reading by Dave Connis	Earphone Award	Winner	
2019	There There by Tommy Orange	Audie Award for Multi-Voiced Performance	Finalist	
2019	We Set the Dark on Fire by Tehlor Kay Mejia	Earphone Award	Winner	
2021	How Moon Fuentez Fell in Love with the Universe by Raquel Vasquez Gilliland	Earphone Award	Winner	
2021	Killers of the Flower Moon: Adapted for Young Readers by David Grann	Earphone Award	Winner	
2021	Together We Will Go by J. Michael Straczynski	Earphone Award	Winner	
2022	How Moon Fuentez Fell in Love with the Universe by Raquel Vasquez Gilliland	Amazing Audiobooks for Young Adults	Top 10	
2022	Class Act by Jerry Craft	Audie Award for Middle Grade Title	Finalist	
2022	Class Act by Jerry Craft	Audie Award for Multi-Voiced Performance	Finalist	
2022	You Have a Friend in 10A: Stories by Maggie Shipstead	Earphone Award	Winner	

=== "Best of" lists ===
Year	Title	List	Ref.
2017	The Red Umbrella by Christina Diaz Gonzalez	Amazing Audiobooks for Young Adults	
2017	Refugee by Alan Gratz	Booklist's Audio Stars for Youth	
2017	Refugee by Alan Gratz	Booklist's Best Youth Historical Fiction on Audio	
2017	Refugee by Alan Gratz	Booklist Editors' Choice: Audio for Youth	
2017	Refugee by Alan Gratz	Publishers Weekly Best Children's/YA Audiobook	
2018	Hope Nation (2018), edited by Rose Brock	AudioFile Best of Young Adult	
2020	We Set the Dark on Fire by Tehlor Kay Mejia	Amazing Audiobooks for Young Adults	
2022	Class Act by Jerry Craft	Amazing Audiobooks for Young Adults	

== Filmography ==
Garcia's film and television credits
Media	Year	Title	Role(s)	Note
Film	1998	The Object of My Affection	Chorus Singer	Uncredited
Film	1999	Just Looking	Student	Uncredited
Film	2013	Shotgun Wedding	Reporter Pamela White	
Film	2018	To Each, Her Own (English)	Additional voices	
Film	2018	Yucatán (English edition)	Veronica	
Short	2010	The Bare Nekked Chef	Kyla Fiber	
Short	2011	Heavy	Mara	
Short	2012	Here Today	Woman	
Short	2012	Limits	Nurse	
Short	2012	Make Believe	Lily	
Short	2012	Sweet Tooth	Lunch Lady	
Short	2013	Sink	Woman	
Short	2014	Chatty Cathy Goes to Yoga	Yogi	
Short	2015	Time Capsule	Claire Rodriguez	
Short	2018	Bday Bail	Annette	
Short	2020	Crystal	Crystal	
Short	2020	The Exchange	Kwanita	
Short	2020	An Unkindness of Ravens	Dr. Emily Parker	
Short	2021	Waking Up 80	Nurse	
Short		Herstory 101: John Smith was a F*ckboy	Dagmar Rodriguez	
TV series	2012	Inside Room 334	Patricia	1 episode
TV series	2014	Agents of S.H.I.E.L.D.	Mrs. Zeller	"Beginning of the End"
TV series	2018	The Incredible Life of Darrell	Reporter	1 episode
TV series	2019	Blackwater	Birdie Blackwater	
TV series	2017-2020	Cable Girls (English)	Lidia Aguilar	42 episodes
TV series	2021	New Amsterdam	Teri	1 episode
TV series	2022	The Wright Turn	Detective Warren	2 episodes
TV series	2024	Spirit Rangers	Łmłaná	1 episode
TV series		Olga Dies Dreaming	Mom in love with Prieto	1 episode
Video game	2018	Dynasty Warriors 9 (English)	Bao Sanniang; Zhang Chunhua	
