= Talking Dreams =

Studio album by Echosmith
- Released: October 1, 2013
- Studio: Can Am, Tarzana, California
- Genre: Dance-rock; indie pop
- Length: 45:56
- Label: Warner Bros.
- Producer: Mike Elizondo

Echosmith chronology
Summer Sampler (2013)	Talking Dreams (2013)	Acoustic Dreams (2014)

Singles from Talking Dreams
- 1. "Cool Kids" Released: May 31, 2013; 2. "Bright" Released: February 2, 2015; 3. "Let's Love" Released: August 11, 2015

Alternate cover
- Cover art for 2014 re-release

Talking Dreams is the debut studio album by American indie pop band Echosmith. The album was released on October 1, 2013, through Warner Bros. Records. All songs on the album were co-written by the four Sierota siblings and their father, Jeffery David.

== Reception ==
Professional ratings
Review scores
Source	Rating
AllMusic	3.5/5 stars
The Guardian	2/5 stars

Matt Collar of AllMusic gave a positive review saying "Echosmith's 2013 debut album, Talking Dreams, introduces a group with an unabashedly youthful take on dance-rock — even though their style pays celebratory tribute to '80s pop music. A band composed of the four Sierota siblings, the California-based Echosmith includes co-lead singer Sydney, guitarist/co-lead singer Jamie, bassist/vocalist Noah, and drummer Graham. Working with producer Mike Elizondo and songwriter Jeffery David, the band's freshman effort is impressively filled out with radio-ready songs that combine U2's chiming guitars, Fleetwood Mac's harmonies, and Killers-style neo-new wave production. In that sense, Echosmith will also draw favorable comparisons to such similarly inclined acts as Paramore, Kitten, and Ireland's Two Door Cinema Club. Cuts like the romantic title track, the sparkling "Let's Love", and the bubbly "Come with Me" are all infectious and smartly produced, and tend to stick in your head long after the album ends. There is a brilliant lightness to these songs — nothing ever feels too thought-out. While this doesn't lend a ton of depth to the album, with the members of Echosmith barely in their twenties and lead singer Sydney just sixteen, it only seems logical to assume that there's room for growth. And based on Talking Dreams, that growth will be a pleasure to witness."

By contrast, Daniel Bromfield of the Daily Emerald criticized both the album and the band itself as lacking originality, declaring that they were the point where the phrase "indie" was "another meaningless marketing word like "all natural"". While he admitted that "the formula the band works under can be done right", he remarked that they showed "exactly zero qualities that elevate them above the rest of the pack" and that their lyrics were subpar, saying that most of the songs incorporated overused imagery, while some "are just plain awful." He notes that "Cool Kids" would have been the best track of the album were it not for "its cringe-worthy chorus of "I wish that I could be like the cool kids/Because all the cool kids seem to fit in.", saying that the line was "terribly ironic" because "the cool kids are the ones that came before them, and Echosmith merely follow in their wake, trying to look and talk and think exactly like them."

Michael Cragg of The Guardian also criticized the album as "catchy but characterless". He notes that the band makes "the kind of polished, laser-guided indie pop that sounds all too familiar", saying that "March Into the Sun", "Bright", and "Come Together" are inspired by other artists, "while the rest congeals into a primary-coloured clump of advert-friendly, frustratingly anonymous background music". "Cool Kids", however, was noted as "the obvious standout". He wrote that the song's "gold-plated chorus is good enough to make you ignore the clunky, straight-to-DVD teen film lyrics".

== Track listing ==
All tracks are written by Echosmith and Jeffery David, except where noted.

No.	Title	Writer(s)	Length
1.	"Come Together"		4:40
2.	"Let's Love"		3:03
3.	"Cool Kids"	Echosmith; David; Jesiah Dzwonek	3:57
4.	"March into the Sun"	Echosmith; David; Tom Leonard	3:22
5.	"Come with Me"		4:12
6.	"Bright"	Echosmith; David; Maureen "Mozella" McDonald	3:42
7.	"Talking Dreams"	Echosmith; David; Leonard	3:09
8.	"Tell Her You Love Her"		4:07
9.	"Ran Off in the Night"		4:24
10.	"Nothing's Wrong"		3:34
11.	"Safest Place"	Echosmith; David; Leonard	4:16
12.	"Surround You"		3:30
Total length:			45:56

Deluxe edition bonus tracks
No.	Title	Length
13.	"Up to You"	3:48
14.	"We're Not Alone"	4:07
Total length:		53:51

- The album was re-released on October 8, 2014, with the radio edit of "Cool Kids" (3:35 min.) replacing the original-release album version.

== Personnel ==
Echosmith

- Sydney Sierota – lead and backing vocals
- Noah Sierota – bass guitar, percussion, vocals
- Jamie Sierota – lead and backing vocals, lead guitar, keyboards, percussion, programming
- Graham Sierota – drums, vocals

Additional musicians

- Jeffery David – percussion
- Mike Elizondo – keyboards, percussion, programming, vocals

== Charts ==
=== Weekly charts ===
Chart (2013–15)	Peak position
Australian Albums (ARIA)	45
Austrian Albums (Ö3 Austria)	39
Belgian Albums (Ultratop Flanders)	85
Belgian Albums (Ultratop Wallonia)	102
Danish Albums (Hitlisten)	23
Dutch Albums (Album Top 100)	46
German Albums (Offizielle Top 100)	47
Swedish Albums (Sverigetopplistan)	56
Swiss Albums (Schweizer Hitparade)	35
US Billboard 200	38
US Heatseekers Albums (Billboard)	1
US Top Rock Albums (Billboard)	48

=== Year-end charts ===
Chart (2015)	Position
US Billboard 200	124

== Certifications ==
Region	Certification	Certified units/sales
New Zealand (RMNZ)	Gold	7,500^{‡}
United States (RIAA)	Gold	500,000^{‡}
^{‡} Sales+streaming figures based on certification alone.
