= Summer Sampler (Echosmith EP) =

EP by Echosmith
- Released: June 11, 2013
- Genre: Indie pop, indie rock
- Length: 11:51
- Label: Warner Bros.
- Producer: Jeffery David

Echosmith chronology
Summer Sampler (2013)	Talking Dreams (2013)

Summer Sampler is the debut EP by American indie pop band Echosmith on Warner Bros. Records. The 3-track sampler was made available for free download via Echosmith’s website, for digital download, and streaming, on June 11, 2013. A CD version was also released during Warped Tour 2013. As part of the staggered release of the free downloads, from May 29, 2013, to June 11, 2013, one single per week was posted to the band's website as part of the sampler.

== Music videos ==
Around the time of release for the sampler, a music video for each corresponding track was posted to the band's YouTube account. Beginning with "Come Together" on May 30, 2013, "Cool Kids" on June 21, 2013, and concluding with "Talking Dreams" on July 24, 2013, to coincide with an announcement for their debut album, Talking Dreams. Of note, with regard to "Cool Kids", the original video released by the band during the sampler push was later replaced by a new version on September 11, 2014.

== Track listing ==
All tracks were written by Jeffery David and Echosmith, except where noted.

No.	Title	Writer(s)	Length
1.	"Come Together"	Echosmith; Jeffery David	4:42
2.	"Cool Kids"	Echosmith; Jeffery David; Jesiah Dzwonek	3:59
3.	"Talking Dreams"	Echosmith; Jeffery David; Tom Leonard	3:10
Total length:			11:51

== Alternate version of Cool Kids ==
While the official version of "Cool Kids" on the sampler runs 3 minutes 59 seconds and concludes with a fade-out, the version originally posted for download on the band's website as well as the individual audio posted to YouTube had a runtime of 4 minutes 9 seconds and lacked the fade-out. The former version eventually made it onto the October 2013 release of Talking Dreams.
