= County Prep High School =

High school in Hudson County, New Jersey, US

Location
- 525 Montgomery Street; Jersey City, Hudson County, New Jersey 07302; United States; 40.7213°N 74.0589°W

Information
- Type: Magnet public high school
- NCES School ID: 340757005906
- Principal: Barbara Mendolla
- Faculty: 91.8 FTEs
- Grades: 9-12
- Enrollment: 892 (as of 2024–25)
- Student to teacher ratio: 9.7:1
- Colors: Black and Gold
- Team name: Panthers
- Website: cphs.hcstonline.org

County Prep High School is a full-time public magnet high school for students in ninth through twelfth grades, located in Jersey City in Hudson County, in the U.S. state of New Jersey, operating as part of the Hudson County Schools of Technology.

As of the 2024–25 school year, the school had an enrollment of 892 students and 91.8 classroom teachers (on an FTE basis), for a student–teacher ratio of 9.7:1. There were 421 students (47.2% of enrollment) eligible for free lunch and 88 (9.9% of students) eligible for reduced-cost lunch.

== Awards, recognition and rankings ==
Schooldigger.com ranked the school for 40th out of 434th for public high schools statewide as of 2026. The school over the pass 10 years ranked between 40th to 124th out of over 400 schools and only improving. In 2024-2025 school year, the 9th grade students had a average proficiency of 91% in its English Language Arts compared to the state average of 49.9.

== Awards and recognition ==
The school was one of nine schools in New Jersey, and the only high school, honored in 2020 by the National Blue Ribbon Schools Program, which recognizes high student achievement.

== Academics ==
Academic courses are aligned to the New Jersey Core Curriculum Content Standards. Career clusters include Communications, Medicine and Science, Business, Information Technology, Arts, and a conjoined special program called JC Arts. Students are involved in the plan and design of their learning path promoting a desire to explore, to be creative, and to succeed.

Program choices ensure that all students participate in internships, work/study programs, and community service before graduation.

== Majors ==
As of the 2026-2027 school year, County Prep offers the following twelve majors;

- Kinesiology and Exercise Science
- Medical Science
- Business
- Childcare and Human Development
- Cosmetology
- Culinary Arts
- Fashion Design
- Audio/Visual Production
- Graphic Technology
- Music Technology
- Networking and Cyber Security/A+ PC Technician
- Photography

== Sports ==
Starting in the 2010-11 school year, County Prep no longer offers sports to their students due to budget cuts. District officials noted that students would remain eligible to compete on behalf of their home school districts.

The 2010 boys' track team became Tri-County Champions defeating McNair Academy and Hoboken High School.

The County Prep Hurricanes girls' tennis team completed its fifth straight Seglio Division season undefeated by beating Marist 5-0 in Bayonne. The Team had won 70 consecutive Seglio Division matches.

The 2007 girls' tennis team won the North II, Group I state sectional championship with a 3-2 win over Glen Ridge High School in the tournament final.

The boys' baseball team won the 2009 North II Group I NJSIAA State Sectional Title, advancing to the Group I tournament where they lost to Park Ridge High School 10–0 in the semi-final round.

== Administration ==
The school's principal is Barbara Mendolla. Her administration team includes the assistant principal.

== Alternative schools ==
County Prep High School also provides alternative schools located in the same building. Career Academy is an alternative High School. School begins after 3:00 pm and students are provided with dinner. The principal for Career Academy is John Holoduek.

Besides Career Academy, another alternative high school is the Adult High School (AHS). AHS begins at 6:30 pm to 8:30 pm and classes are in session from Monday to Thursday. Students must graduate with at least 110 credits and pass the High School Proficiency Assessment (HSPA) or be SRA. Students can take up to 20 credits per semester and can finish high school in three years.

Course programs towards earning a GED at County Prep High School are offered after 4:00 pm.
