= Cool Kids (song) =

Single by Echosmith

from the album Talking Dreams
- Released: May 31, 2013
- Recorded: 2012
- Genre: Indie pop; pop rock
- Length: 3:58
- Label: Warner Bros.
- Songwriters: Jeffery David; Jesiah Dzwonek; Sydney Sierota; Noah Sierota; Graham Sierota; Jamie Sierota
- Producers: Mike Elizondo; Rob Cavallo

Echosmith singles chronology
"Cool Kids" (2013)	"Bright" (2015)

Music video
- "Cool Kids" on YouTube

"Cool Kids" is the debut single by American indie pop band Echosmith from their debut studio album, Talking Dreams (2013). The song was written by Echosmith, Jeffery David, and Jesiah Dzwonek. It was produced by Mike Elizondo, with additional production on the radio edit by Rob Cavallo. "Cool Kids" was originally released on May 31, 2013, as the iTunes Store Single of the Week and officially impacted United States radio the following year. The song subsequently became a sleeper hit, peaking at number 13 on the Billboard Hot 100 and receiving airplay on US modern rock, hot adult contemporary, and contemporary hit radio stations. It also reached the top 10 in seven countries.

== Background ==
The song describes a boy and a girl who both desire to be noticed. In an interview, guitarist Jamie Sierota discussed the song's background, saying: "This cry to be like the cool kids… it's something that everyone kind of goes through whether you want to act like it or not... There's always somebody out there that you kind of wish, 'If only I could do this, or do that.' I think that's why it connects with people so well."

== Composition ==
"Cool Kids" is written in the key of A♭ major, and follows a chord progression of Fm–D♭–A♭–E♭ (vi–IV–I–V). The tempo of the song is 130 beats per minute.

== Music video ==
The song's official music video was filmed in Los Angeles, California and directed by Gus Black. It was released on June 21, 2013, on Echosmith's official YouTube channel. After the original video passed one million views, Echosmith released an acoustic version of the song. The band also released a new music video for "Cool Kids" on September 12, 2014, directed by Mark Pellington.

== Commercial performance ==
"Cool Kids" debuted at number 87 on the Billboard Hot 100 for the issue dated July 26, 2014 and peaked at number 13. The song also reached the top ten of the Billboard Mainstream Top 40 and Adult Top 40 charts, peaking at numbers 9 and 5 respectively. It was certified gold by the Recording Industry Association of America on October 4, 2014, and passed the one million sales mark later on in the same month. As of December 2014, it has sold over 1.1 million copies in the United States. "Cool Kids" also peaked at number 6 on the Australian singles chart and was certified double platinum in the country.

== Other versions ==
In September 2022, the group released a new version of the song, labelled as "our version". The version was nominated for Self-Released Record of the Year at the 2023 Libera Awards.

== Track listing ==
Digital download
No.	Title	Length
1.	"Cool Kids" (Radio Edit)	3:35

Digital download – remix
No.	Title	Length
1.	"Cool Kids" (RAC mix)	4:19

British digital download
No.	Title	Length
1.	"Cool Kids" (Radio Edit)	3:35
2.	"Cool Kids" (Acoustic)	3:56
3.	"Cool Kids" (RAC mix)	4:19

CD single
No.	Title	Length
1.	"Cool Kids" (Radio Edit)	3:37
2.	"Cool Kids" (Acoustic)	3:56

== Charts ==
=== Weekly charts ===
Chart (2013–15)	Peak position
Australia (ARIA)	6
Austria (Ö3 Austria Top 40)	5
Belgium (Ultratop 50 Flanders)	36
Belgium (Ultratop 50 Wallonia)	34
Brazil (Billboard Hot 100)	74
Canada Hot 100 (Billboard)	25
Canada AC (Billboard)	39
Canada CHR/Top 40 (Billboard)	24
Canada Hot AC (Billboard)	25
Czech Republic Airplay (ČNS IFPI)	43
Czech Republic Singles Digital (ČNS IFPI)	8
Denmark (Tracklisten)	6
Denmark Airplay (Tracklisten)	1
Finland (Suomen virallinen radiolista)	20
France (SNEP)	82
Germany (GfK)	8
Hungary (Stream Top 40)	18
Ireland (IRMA)	8
Italy (FIMI)	18
Netherlands (Dutch Top 40)	10
Netherlands (Single Top 100)	19
New Zealand (Recorded Music NZ)	13
Norway (VG-lista)	17
Poland Airplay (ZPAV)	6
Poland (Polish TV Airplay Chart)	1
Poland Dance (ZPAV)	46
Scottish Singles Sales (Official Charts)	17
Slovakia Airplay (ČNS IFPI)	52
Slovakia Singles Digital (ČNS IFPI)	11
Slovenia (SloTop50)	4
Spain (Promusicae)	15
Sweden (Sverigetopplistan)	23
Switzerland (Schweizer Hitparade)	9
UK Singles (Official Charts)	17
US Billboard Hot 100	13
US Adult Contemporary (Billboard)	11
US Adult Pop Airplay (Billboard)	5
US Alternative Airplay (Billboard)	34
US Pop Airplay (Billboard)	9
US Rock & Alternative Airplay (Billboard)	49

=== Year-end charts ===
Chart (2014)	Position
Australia (ARIA)	50
Netherlands (Dutch Top 40)	61
Netherlands (Single Top 100)	79
Sweden (Sverigetopplistan)	96
US Billboard Hot 100	59
US Adult Top 40 (Billboard)	25
US Mainstream Top 40 (Billboard)	45
Chart (2015)	Position
Austria (Ö3 Austria Top 40)	62
Denmark (Tracklisten)	100
Germany (Official German Charts)	63
Netherlands (Dutch Top 40)	94
Netherlands (NPO 3FM)	84
Slovenia (SloTop50)	14
Switzerland (Schweizer Hitparade)	65
US Adult Contemporary (Billboard)	32

== Certifications ==
Region	Certification	Certified units/sales
Australia (ARIA)	2× Platinum	140,000^{^}
Canada (Music Canada)	Platinum	80,000^{*}
Denmark (IFPI Danmark)	Platinum	60,000^{^}
Germany (BVMI)	Gold	200,000^{‡}
Italy (FIMI)	Platinum	30,000^{‡}
New Zealand (RMNZ)	2× Platinum	60,000^{‡}
Norway (IFPI Norway)	2× Platinum	20,000^{‡}
Spain (Promusicae)	Gold	20,000^{‡}
Sweden (GLF)	Platinum	40,000^{‡}
Switzerland (IFPI Switzerland)	Gold	15,000^{‡}
United Kingdom (BPI)	Platinum	600,000^{‡}
United States (RIAA)	4× Platinum	4,000,000^{‡}
^{*} Sales figures based on certification alone.^{^} Shipments figures based on certification alone.^{‡} Sales+streaming figures based on certification alone.

== Release history ==
Region	Date	Format	Label
United States	May 31, 2013	Digital download	Warner Bros.
United States	June 3, 2014	Mainstream airplay	Warner Bros.
