= Inside a Dream (EP) =

EP by Echosmith
- Released: September 29, 2017
- Genre: Synth-pop, indie pop
- Length: 24:15
- Label: Warner Bros.
- Producer: Jeffery David, Dan Muckala (add.)

Echosmith chronology
Spotify Sessions (2015)	Inside a Dream (2017)	An Echosmith Christmas (2017)

Professional ratings
Review scores
Source	Rating
AllMusic	4.5/5 stars

Inside a Dream is the third EP by indie pop band Echosmith, and was released on September 29, 2017, as the first release since guitarist Jamie Sierota left the band to take care of his newborn son. The band originally intended to release their second album on this date, but pushed its release back.

== Reception ==
Neil Z. Yeung of AllMusic gave a positive review, saying, "After delaying their anticipated sophomore LP -- which was expected in late 2017 -- American pop trio Echosmith instead released the EP Inside a Dream. Issued as an appetizer to tide over their fans, the seven-song release is an interesting, though not entirely surprising, departure from the early, more guitar-based style found on their debut, Talking Dreams. Here, the Sierota siblings -- Sydney, Noah, and Graham -- push synth-pop to the fore, creating a blend that sounds like 1989-era Taylor Swift fronting the 2017 incarnations of PVRIS or MisterWives. ... As a preview of potential things to come, Inside a Dream offers just the right amount to satisfy and to build anticipation for a full-length effort that should mark a new and refreshing direction for the group."

Variety writer Taryn Nobil said the EP's music "sticks to the band's catchy pop pastiche while highlighting a shiny layer of dance-ability."

OrbitPop raised the question of what the band was actually doing, saying, "For one, the EP is far longer than most EPs at seven songs and in the EP Echosmith celebrates their ability to create a cohesive album, proving that the art of the album is not dead quite yet. There has been speculation that singles will overtake the popularity of creating an album that tells a cohesive story, but in listening to 'Inside a Dream' it’s clear that it’s not a lost art at all."

== EP announcement ==
Originally, Echosmith's then-upcoming sophomore album was set to be released on this date, but the band announced over their social media networks that the full-length album's release would be pushed to spring 2018. Instead, they would release a 7-song EP in its stead, stating, "... we've been overrun with inspiration lately and have more we would like to add to the album." They also postponed the Inside a Dream Tour to coincide with the full album's - at the time - tentative release date of March 30, 2018. However, that release never materialized.

== Track listing ==
All tracks were written by Jeffery David and Echosmith, except where noted.

No.	Title	Writer(s)	Producer(s)	Length
1.	"Lessons"	Echosmith; Jeffery David; Daniel John Muckala; Phil Bentley	David	4:15
2.	"Get Into My Car"	Echosmith; David; Leah Haywood	David	3:45
3.	"18"	Echosmith; David; Mareen McDonald	David	3:02
4.	"Future Me"	Echosmith; David; Muckala; Thomas Kipp Williams; Breanna Kennedy	David; Dan Muckala (add.)	3:25
5.	"Goodbye"	Echosmith; David; Muckala; Williams; Bobbie Allen	David; Muckala (add.)	3:29
6.	"Hungry"	Echosmith; David; Muckala; Williams; Kennedy	David; Muckala (add.)	3:21
7.	"Dear World"	Echosmith; David; Jonathan Mark Foreman	David	2:59

== Promotional singles/music videos ==
- "Goodbye"
- "Future Me"
- "Dear World"
- "Get Into My Car"

== Personnel ==
=== Echosmith ===
- Sydney Sierota – lead vocals
- Noah Sierota – guitar, bass, vocals
- Graham Sieorta – drums, percussion, vocals

=== Additional musicians ===
- Jamie Sierota – acoustic guitars and vocals on "Dear World"
- Micah Kuiper – guitar, keyboards, vocals
- Adam Lester – guitar
- Dan Muckala – keyboards, programming, vocals
- Brandon Paddock – keyboards, programming
- Tim Pierce – guitar
