= Echosmith =

American rock and indie pop band

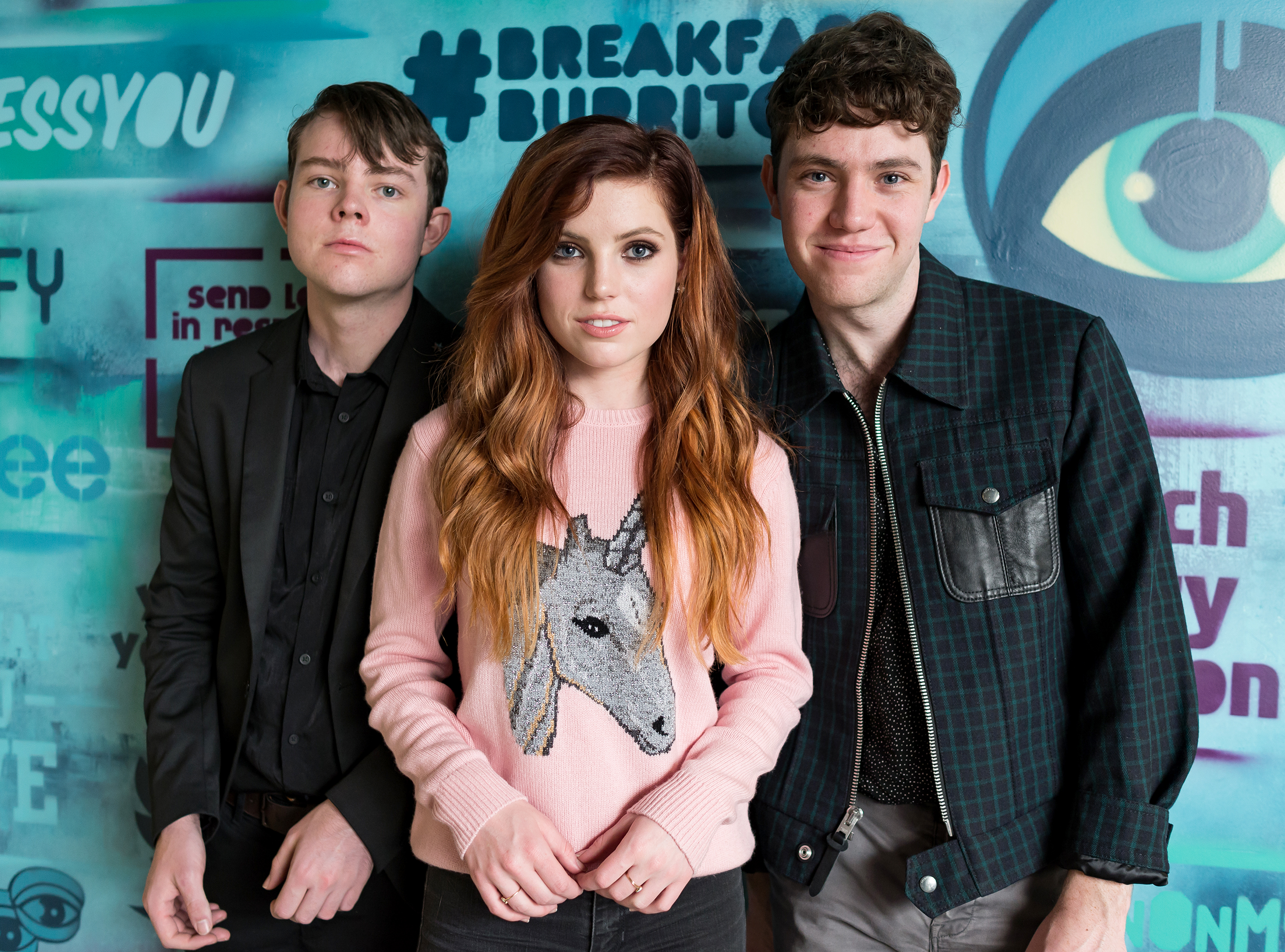
- Echosmith as a trio in 2017. From left to right: Graham Sierota, Sydney Quiseng and Noah Sierota.

Background information
- Origin: Chino, California, U.S.
- Genres: Rock; dance-rock; indie pop; indie rock
- Years active: 2006–present
- Labels: Warner Bros.; Because
- Members: Sydney Quiseng; Noah Sierota; Graham Sierota
- Past members: Jamie Sierota
- Website: echosmith.com

Echosmith is an American indie pop band formed in February 2006 in Chino, California. Originally formed as a quartet of siblings, the band currently consists of Sydney, Noah, and Graham Sierota, following the departure of oldest sibling Jamie in 2016. Echosmith started first as Ready Set Go! until signing with Warner Bros. Records in May 2012. They are best known for their 2013 single "Cool Kids", which peaked at number 13 on the Billboard Hot 100 and received quadruple platinum certification by the Recording Industry Association of America (RIAA). The song was also Warner Bros. Records' fifth-biggest-selling-digital song of 2014—with 1.3 million downloads sold—and preceded the band's debut studio album, Talking Dreams (2013), which moderately entered the Billboard 200 and spawned the top 40 single "Bright".

== Early life ==
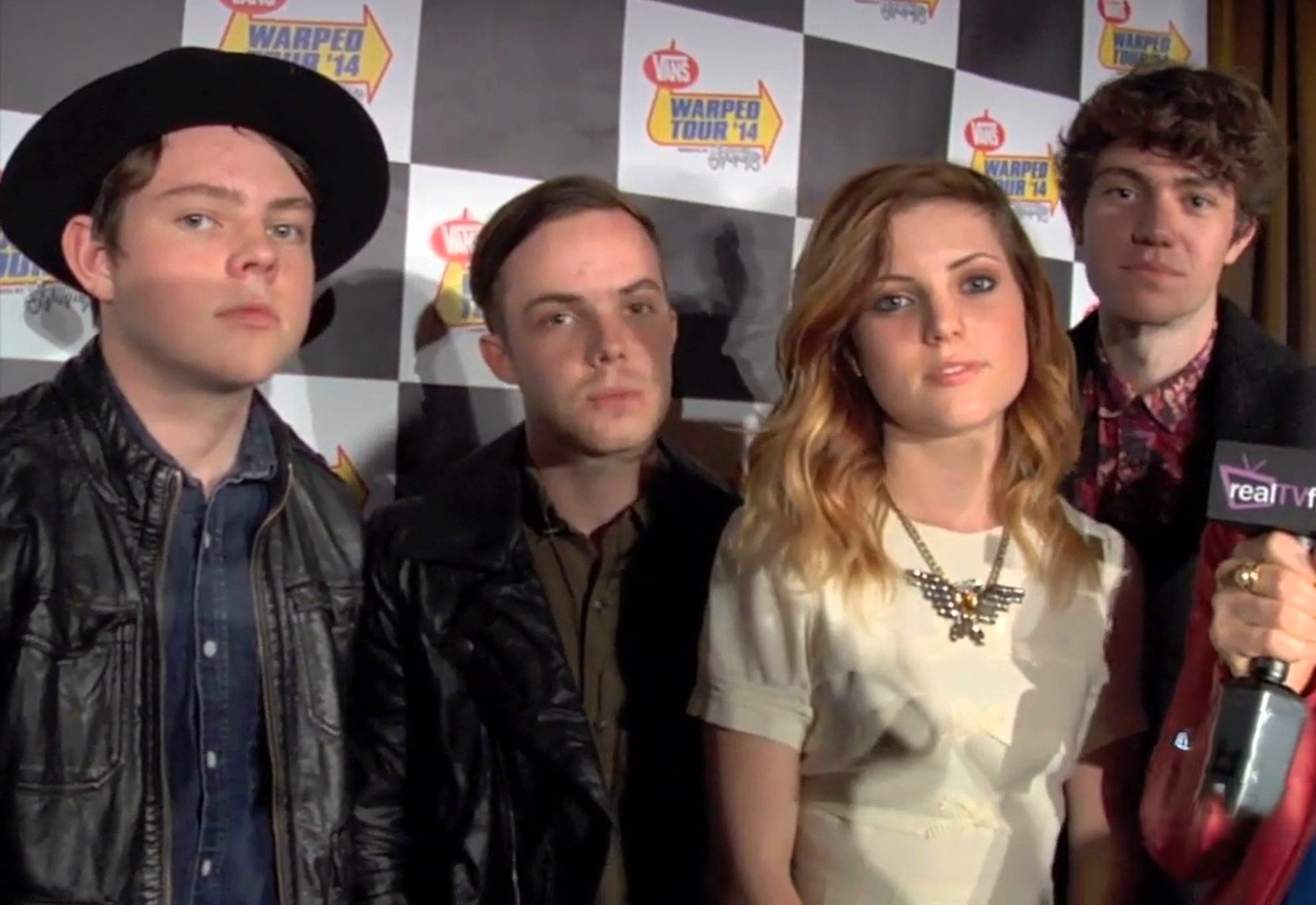
Left to right: Graham, Jamie, Sydney, and Noah Sierota in 2014

The group grew up in a musical household playing multiple instruments throughout their childhood. The band has mentioned that numerous rock artists, including Coldplay, Echo & the Bunnymen, the Smiths, the Killers, U2, Joy Division, and Fleetwood Mac influenced them while growing up and encouraged them to make music together. The youngest sibling, Graham, plays drums. The only female sibling, Sydney, is co-lead vocalist for the band, often contributing on tambourine and keyboard. Noah plays bass and sings back-up vocals for the band. Jamie was co-lead singer and played guitar before leaving the band. Graham is diagnosed with autism.

== Career ==
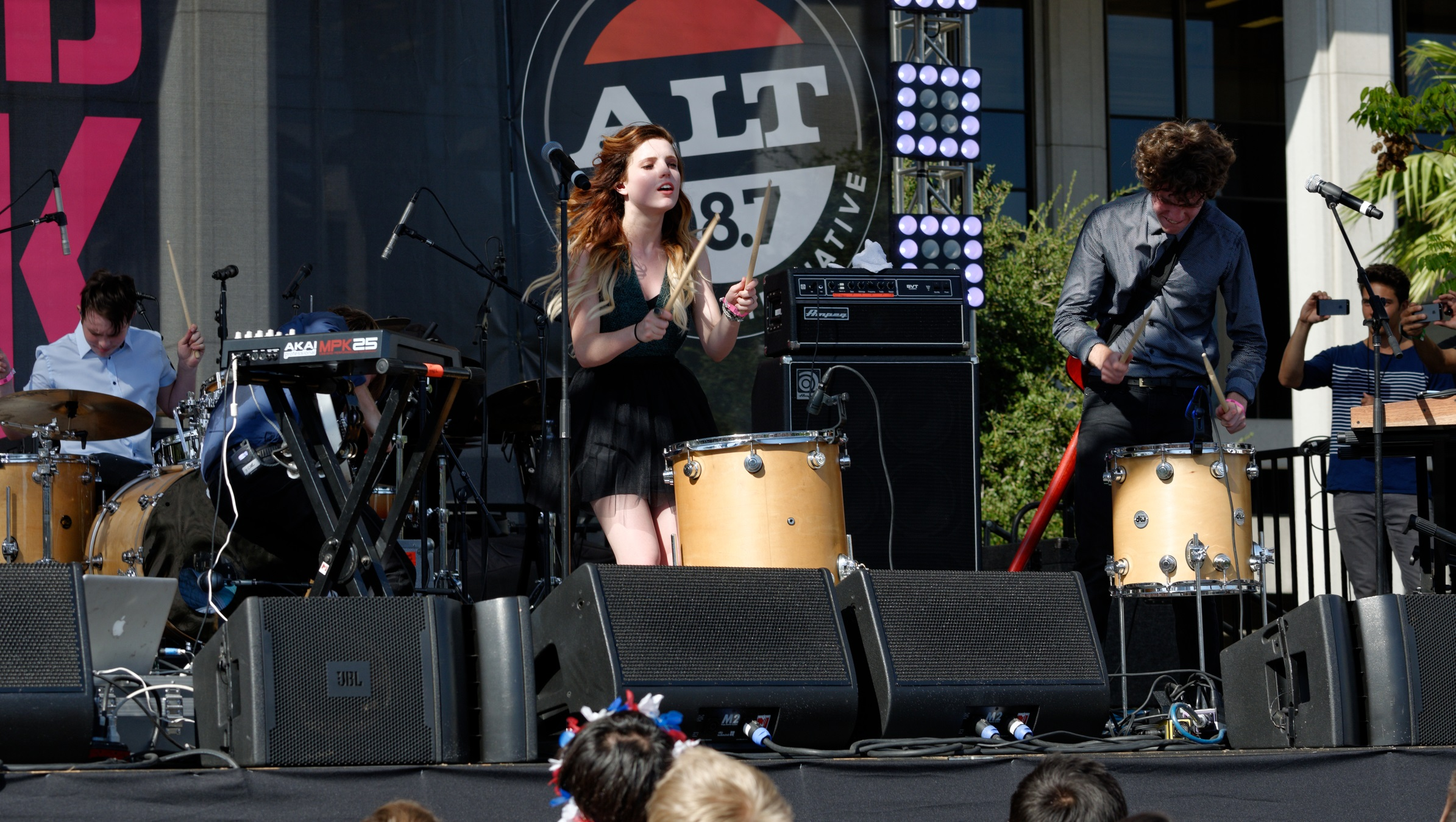
Echosmith performing in July 2014

Echosmith has also released an array of covers of songs such as "I Will Wait" by Mumford & Sons, "Lights" by Ellie Goulding, "Set Fire to the Rain" by Adele, and "Princess of China" by Coldplay and Rihanna. The band is currently managed by their father, producer and songwriter Jeffery David, who helped develop the band as well as co-writing the majority of the band's debut album. In April 2013, Echosmith was named one of the "100 Bands You Need To Know" by Alternative Press. On May 31, 2013, Echosmith released their new single on YouTube, "Come Together". The video was directed by Justin Coloma and filmed in Los Angeles, CA. Echosmith launched a Summer Sampler free download promo on their website, with the songs "Cool Kids", "Come Together", and "Talking Dreams".

On June 7, 2013, the band performed a free concert at Warner Bros. Records in Burbank, CA, with simultaneous streaming through Echosmith's YouTube channel. Echosmith was featured on ESPN's June programming. The featured songs consisted of "Come Together", "Let's Love", and "March Into The Sun." Echosmith also performed on the entire 2013 Vans Warped Tour. The band toured the United States and Canada as the opening act for Owl City on his 2013 Midsummer Station tour. The band's debut album, Talking Dreams, was released on October 8, 2013. Echosmith released a holiday track "I Heard the Bells on Christmas Day" on December 3, 2013. It was available to download for free on their website through the month of December. The band performed the song "Cool Kids" on December 31, 2013, during the Teen Nick top 10: New Year's Eve Countdown, hosted by Nick Cannon. Echosmith was selected as MTV's 2014 Artists To Watch. The band's song, "Surround You" was featured in the soundtrack for the film Endless Love.

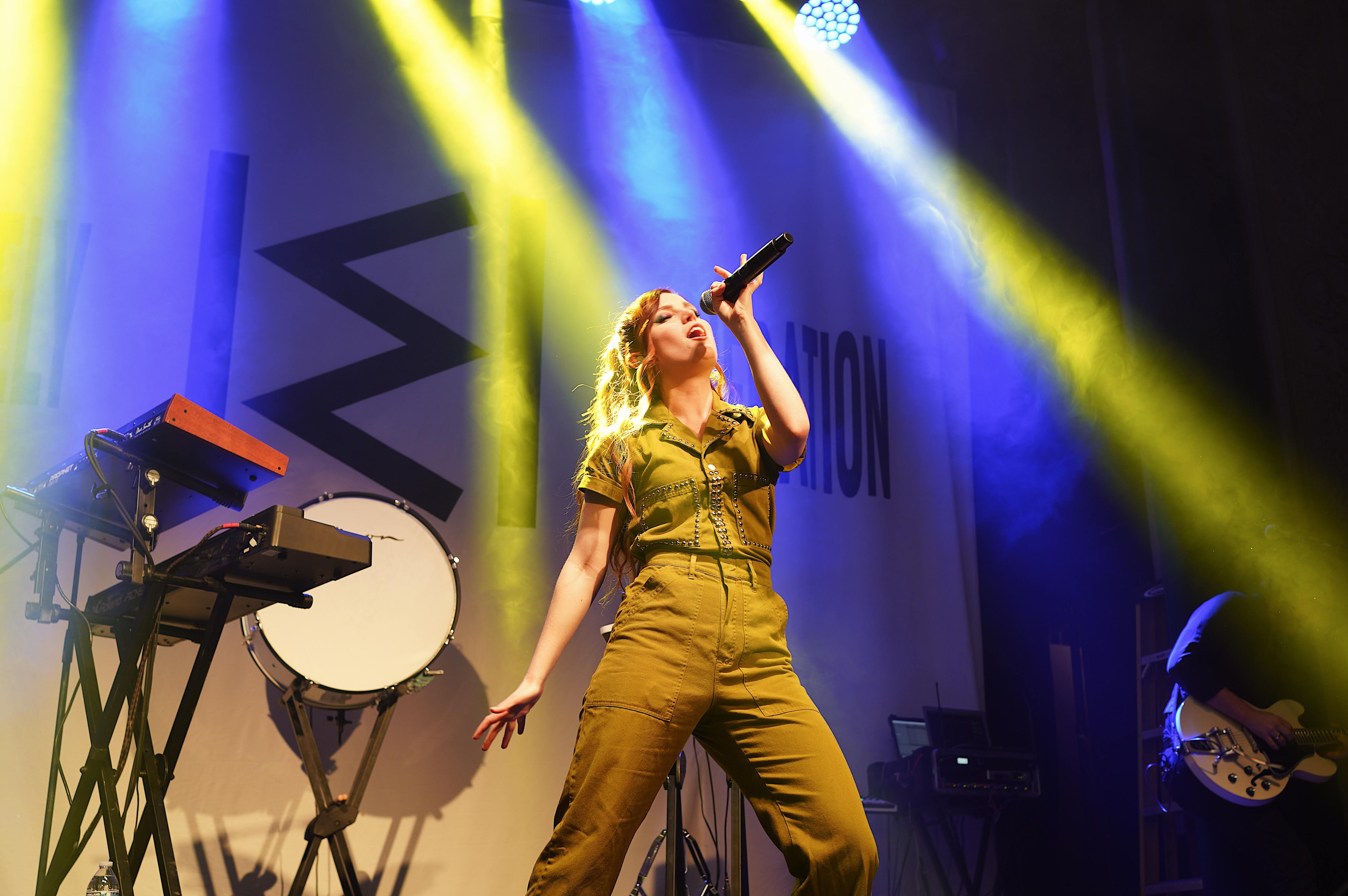
Echosmith performing in San Francisco, March 2020

Echosmith played on the Vans Warped Tour in 2014 for the second year in a row. Echosmith made their late night TV premiere in June 2014, performing "Cool Kids" on Conan and the Teen Wolf after-show, Wolf Watch. In 2015, Echosmith supported Twenty One Pilots on their national tour. On June 10, Echosmith released an acoustic EP, titled Acoustic Dreams, which features acoustic versions of four tracks off Talking Dreams, in addition to one new track titled "Terminal". Leading up to the release, the acoustic version of "Cool Kids" was premiered on the group's YouTube channel on June 3. Echosmith was the MTV Push Artist of the Month for November 2014. The band had a headline tour with The Colourist as their supporting act in February 2015. In 2015, Echosmith provided the vocals for Russian-German DJ and musician Zedd's track "Illusion", featured on his second studio album titled True Colors. In August, the band announced that Jamie Sierota would be taking a break from the band in preparation for fatherhood; session musician Josh Murty filled in on guitar for the band's tour dates. The band made a guest appearance in The Muppets episode "Single All the Way" (S1:E10), which originally aired December 8, 2015. In 2016 Sydney announced a collaboration with Hollister for a fashion line. In November 2016, the band announced via Twitter, Facebook and mail newsletter that Jamie will no longer be part of the band so that he can take care of his baby. They also stated they will continue as a trio. Also in 2016, Sydney collaborated with The Goo Goo Dolls on their song, "Flood", which can be found on their album Boxes.

Leading up to what was supposed to be the release of the band's sophomore album and corresponding tour, "Goodbye" was released as the lead single on July 14, 2017. One week later, the band performed their new single live for the first time at the 2017 MTV Fandom Awards during San Diego Comic-Con. Over the summer, two additional singles, "Future Me" and "Dear World," were also released. After a prior announcement delaying the album and tour until Spring 2018, the Inside a Dream EP was released in its stead on September 29, 2017. With this release, "Get Into My Car" was featured as a promotional single with a corresponding music video. In March 2018, the band released a new lead single, "Over My Head," pushing the album to summer, and subsequently delaying it indefinitely. Later that summer, the band opened for Pentatonix on their tour and rounded out the year with a Christmas show in San Diego on December 8, 2018. On March 8, 2019, Echosmith released their single "Favorite Sound," as a collaboration with musician Audien, as well as a cover of "Reflektor" by Arcade Fire, originally from 2013. Later that year, Echosmith and for KING & COUNTRY worked on a remix cover of "God Only Knows." Echosmith performed during the Magnificent Mile Lights Festival on November 23, 2019, in Chicago; the event was broadcast nationally. The band's second studio album, Lonely Generation, was released on January 10, 2020, via their Echosmith Music label under Warner Music Group. On May 28, 2022, Echosmith performed the English opening song of the 25th season of Pokémon the Series, "With You."

On July 28, 2023, the band released their third album, Echosmith. The album was preceded by four singles in the year leading up to its release: "Hang Around", "Gelato", "Hindsight" and "Sour".

On August 26, 2024, Sydney changed her professional name to Sydney Quiseng, adopting the last name of her husband Cameron Quiseng, and began hinting on social media that she would be starting a solo career. Her debut single as a solo artist, "Wonder", was released on September 13, 2024. Over the next eight months, she released the singles "Guilty", "Phases", "I Need Findin'" and "Leftover Coffee", all of which appeared on her debut EP Phases, released on June 20, 2025. Her sophomore EP, That's My Baby!, was released on February 20, 2026, and was written during her pregnancy with her first child.

== Awards and nominations ==
Award	Year	Nominee(s)	Category	Result	Ref.
MTV Europe Music Awards	2015	Echosmith	Best New Act	Nominated	
MTV Europe Music Awards	2015	Echosmith	Best Push Act	Nominated	
Teen Choice Awards	2015	Echosmith	Choice Music: Summer Group	Nominated	
Teen Choice Awards	2015	"Cool Kids"	Choice Music Single: Group	Nominated	

== Band members ==
Current

- Sydney Grace Ann Sierota Quiseng – lead and backing vocals, rhythm guitar, piano, keyboards (2006–present)
- Graham Jeffery David Sierota – drums, percussion (2006–present)
- Noah Jeffery David Joseph Sierota – bass, lead and backing vocals, synthesizer, programming (2006–present)

Former

- Jamie Jeffery David Harry Sierota – lead guitar, keyboards, synthesizer, programming, lead and backing vocals (2006–2016)

Touring

- Josh Murty – guitar, backing vocals (2015–2017, 2019–present)
- Breanne Düren – keyboards, vocals (2017–present)
- Jacob Evergreen – guitar, backing vocals (2018–present)

Timeline

== Influences ==
Echosmith is described as an indie rock and 1980s dance-rock-influenced band. The band has cited Coldplay, U2, the Killers and the Smiths as influences. American Christian rock band Switchfoot has also been a big influence for the band and the reason they started making music.

== Discography ==
Studio albums

- Talking Dreams (2013)
- Lonely Generation (2020)
- Echosmith (2023)

== Concert tours ==
Headlining

- Talking Dreams Tour (2014–2016)
- Inside a Dream Tour (2018)
- The Lonely Generation Tour (2020)
- The Hang Around Tour (2022)
- Cool Kids: The Decade Tour (2024)

Co-headlining

- The Midsummer Station (2013) (with various artists)
- Vans Warped Tour (2013–2014) (with various artists)
- Life is Beautiful (2014) (with various artists)
- American Authors (2014) (with various artists)

Opening act

- The Other Side Tour (2013) (Tonight Alive)
- Neon Trees Fall Tour (2014) (Neon Trees)
- Lindsey Stirling 2014/2015 Tour (2015) (Lindsey Stirling)
- Blurryface Tour (2015) (Twenty One Pilots)
- PTX Presents Tour (2018) (Pentatonix)
