= 38th Lambda Literary Awards =

2026 awards ceremony for LGBTQ+ literature

37th Lambda Literary Awards
- Awarded for: Works of LGBTQ+ literature
- Country: United States
- Presented by: Lambda Literary Foundation
- Eligibility: LGBTQ+ storytelling, published in the US in 2025
- Website: lambdaliterary.org/awards

The 38th Lambda Literary Awards honor works of LGBTQ+ literature published in 2025. Finalists were announced on March 18, 2026, and winners were announced on June 12, 2026.

== Nominees ==
Award winners and finalists
Category	Author	Title	Publisher	Result	Ref.
Bisexual Fiction	Demree McGhee	Sympathy for Wild Girls	Feminist Press	Winner	
Bisexual Fiction	Kerry Cullen	House of Beth	Simon & Schuster	Finalist	
Bisexual Fiction	Melissa Lozada-Oliva	Beyond All Reasonable Doubt, Jesus Is Alive!: Stories	Astra House	Finalist	
Bisexual Fiction	Anbara Salam	The Salvage	Zando/Tin House	Finalist	
Bisexual Fiction	A. M. Sosa	And I'll Take Out Your Eyes	Algonquin Books	Finalist	
Bisexual Nonfiction	Lidia Yuknavitch	Reading the Waves	Riverhead	Winner	
Bisexual Nonfiction	Gabrielle Drolet	Look Ma, No Hands	McClelland & Stewart	Finalist	
Bisexual Nonfiction	Catherine Lacey	The Möbius Book	Farrar, Straus & Giroux	Finalist	
Bisexual Nonfiction	Lee Horikoshi Roripaugh	unMothered, unTongued	University of Georgia Press	Finalist	
Bisexual Nonfiction	Wayne Scott	The Maps They Gave Us: One Marriage, Reimagined	Black Lawrence Press	Finalist	
Bisexual Poetry	Anna Swanson	The Garbage Poems	Brick Books	Winner	
Bisexual Poetry	Clayre Benzadón, edited by Sara Wagner	Moon as Salted Lemon	Driftwood	Finalist	
Bisexual Poetry	Liza Flum	Hover	Omnidawn Publishing	Finalist	
Bisexual Poetry	Rebecca Salazar	antibody	McClelland & Stewart	Finalist	
Bisexual Poetry	Chet'la Sebree	Blue Opening	Zando/Tin House	Finalist	
Gay Fiction	Charlie Porter	Nova Scotia House	Nightboat Books	Winner	
Gay Fiction	Tash Aw	The South	Farrar, Straus, and Giroux	Finalist	
Gay Fiction	Martin Cloutier	Waiting for Something Else	Heliotrope Books	Finalist	
Gay Fiction	Adam Haslett	Mothers and Sons	Little, Brown	Finalist	
Gay Fiction	Sam Wachman	The Sunflower Boys	HarperCollins	Finalist	
Gay Memoir/ Biography	Thomas Dai	TAKE MY NAME BUT SAY IT SLOW: ESSAYS	W. W. Norton	Winner	
Gay Memoir/ Biography	Daniel Brook	The Einstein of Sex: Dr. Magnus Hirschfeld, Visionary of Weimar Berlin	W. W. Norton	Finalist	
Gay Memoir/ Biography	Edgar Gomez	Alligator Tears	Crown	Finalist	
Gay Memoir/ Biography	Jeremy Atherton Lin	Deep House: The Gayest Love Story Ever Told	Little, Brown, and Company	Finalist	
Gay Memoir/ Biography	Martin Sherman	On the Boardwalk	Inkandescent	Finalist	
Gay Poetry	Ben Kline	It Was Never Supposed To Be	Variant Literature	Winner	
Gay Poetry	Gustavo Hernandez	Bachelor	FlowerSong Press	Finalist	
Gay Poetry	W. J. Lofton	boy maybe: poems	Beacon Press	Finalist	
Gay Poetry	Rajiv Mohabir	Seabeast	Four Way Books	Finalist	
Gay Poetry	Pádraig Ó Tuama	Kitchen Hymns	Copper Canyon Press	Finalist	
Gay Romance	Timothy Janovsky	A Mannequin for Christmas	St. Martin's Griffin	Winner	
Gay Romance	Erin Dunn	He's to Die For	Minotaur Books	Finalist	
Gay Romance	Blair Fell	Disco Witches of Fire Island	Alcove Press	Finalist	
Gay Romance	Carey Sass	Good Boy	Self-published	Finalist	
Gay Romance	Derek Sowers	A Bridge in Glass	Dreamsprinner Press	Finalist	
Lesbian Fiction	Kat Dunn	Hungerstone	Zando	Winner	
Lesbian Fiction	Shoshana von Blanckensee	Girls Girls Girls	G.P. Putnam's Sons	Finalist	
Lesbian Fiction	Jaime Burnet	milktooth	Vagrant Press	Finalist	
Lesbian Fiction	Marisa Crane	A Sharp Endless Need	Dial Press	Finalist	
Lesbian Fiction	Dylin Hardcastle	A Language of Limbs	Dutton	Finalist	
Lesbian Memoir/ Biography	Mary Frances Phillips	Black Panther Woman: The Political and Spiritual Life of Ericka Huggins	New York University Press	Winner	
Lesbian Memoir/ Biography	Melissa Febos	The Dry Season	Alfred A. Knopf	Finalist	
Lesbian Memoir/ Biography	Lana Lin	The Autobiography of H. Lan Thao Lam	Dorothy, a publishing project	Finalist	
Lesbian Memoir/ Biography	Francesca Wade	Gertrude Stein	Scribner	Finalist	
Lesbian Memoir/ Biography	Michelle Young	The Art Spy: The Extraordinary Untold Tale of WWII Resistance Hero Rose Valland	HarperOne	Finalist	
Lesbian Poetry	Bianca Rae Messinger	Pleasureis Amiracle	Nightboat	Winner	
Lesbian Poetry	Sophia Dahlin	Glove Money	Nightboat Books	Finalist	
Lesbian Poetry	Donika Kelly	The Natural Order of Things	Graywolf Press	Finalist	
Lesbian Poetry	Roya Marsh	savings time	MCD	Finalist	
Lesbian Poetry	Judite Teixeira, translated by Samantha Pious	Cactus Flowers: Selected Poems	Headmistress Press	Finalist	
Lesbian Romance	Alexandra Vasti	Ladies in Hating	St. Martin's Griffin	Winner	
Lesbian Romance	Susie Dumond	Bed and Breakup	Dial Press	Finalist	
Lesbian Romance	Harley Laroux	House of Rayne	Kensington Publishing Corporation	Finalist	
Lesbian Romance	Evie Marque	Hot Tea & Bird Calls	Self-published	Finalist	
Lesbian Romance	Roslyn Sinclair	The Woman from the Waves	Self-published	Finalist	
LGBTQ Anthology	Paul Martineau and Ryan Linkof (eds.)	Queer Lens: A History of Photography	J. Paul Getty Museum	Winner	
LGBTQ Anthology	Sarah Fonseca and Octavia Saenz	The New Lesbian Pulp	Feminist Press	Finalist	
LGBTQ Anthology	Alden Jones (ed.)	Edge of the World: An Anthology of Queer Travel Writing	Blair	Finalist	
LGBTQ Anthology	Meghan Kemp-Gee and Megan Praz	Come Out and Play: The Queer Sports Project	Stacked Deck Press	Finalist	
LGBTQ Anthology	Alex D. Ketchum and Megan J. Elias (eds.)	Queers at the Table: An Illustrated Guide to Queer Food (with Recipes)	Arsenal Pulp Press	Finalist	
LGBTQ Children's	Jerrold Connors	JIM! Six True Stories about One Great Artist: James Marshall	Dial Books for Young Readers	Winner	
LGBTQ Children's	Simon James Green	A Year of Pride and Joy	Magic Cat	Finalist	
LGBTQ Children's	A. J. Irving with Cynthia Alonso (ill.)	The Bi Book	Alfred A. Knopf Books for Young Readers	Finalist	
LGBTQ Children's	Vincent X. Kirsch	O.K. Is Gay	Abrams Books for Young Readers	Finalist	
LGBTQ Children's	Alana Tyson with Ebony Glenn (ill.)	Devin's Gift	Philomel	Finalist	
LGBTQ Children's	Pete Jordi Wood	Tales from Beyond the Rainbow	Penguin Young Readers	Finalist	
LGBTQ Comics	Mike Curato	Gaysians	Algonquin Books	Winner	
LGBTQ Comics	Askel Aden	Love, Misha	First Second	Finalist	
LGBTQ Comics	Alison Bechdel	Spent	Mariner Books	Finalist	
LGBTQ Comics	Kayla E.	Precious Rubbish	Fantagraphics	Finalist	
LGBTQ Comics	Bread Tarleton	Soften the Blow	Fieldmouse Press	Finalist	
LGBTQ Drama	Jordan E. Cooper	Ain't No Mo'	Theatre Communications Group	Winner	
LGBTQ Drama	LM Feldman, translated by MoMo Holt	Another Kind of Silence	City Theatre Company	Finalist	
LGBTQ Drama	Gina Femia	Mercutio Loves Romeo Loves Juliet Loves	Original Works	Finalist	
LGBTQ Drama	Jordan Tannahill	Prince Faggot	Playwrights Canada Press	Finalist	
LGBTQ Drama	Sarah Waisvisz	Heartlines: A Love Story	Talonbooks	Finalist	
LGBTQ Romance and Erotica	TJ Alexander	A Gentleman's Gentleman	Vintage Books	Winner	
LGBTQ Romance and Erotica	J. E. Birk	Fanboy in the Falls	Maple Mountains	Finalist	
LGBTQ Romance and Erotica	Adib Khorram	It Had to Be Him	Forever	Finalist	
LGBTQ Romance and Erotica	Tara Tai	Single Player	Alcove Press	Finalist	
LGBTQ Romance and Erotica	Aj Writer	Strip Me Down	Self under FWDIO Studios	Finalist	
LGBTQ Middle Grade	Rainie Oet	Glitch Girl!	Penguin Young Readers	Winner	
LGBTQ Middle Grade	Andrea Beatriz Arango	It's All or Nothing, Vale	Random House Books for Young Readers	Finalist	
LGBTQ Middle Grade	Kyle Casey Chu	The Queen Bees of Tybee County	HarperCollins – Quill Tree Books		
LGBTQ Middle Grade	K. O'Neill	A Song for You and I	Random House Graphic		
LGBTQ Middle Grade	Taylor Tracy	Pasta Girls	HarperCollins – Quill Tree Books		
LGBTQ Mystery	Robert Holtom	A Queer Case	Titan Books	Winner	
LGBTQ Mystery	Samantha Crewson	Every Sweet Thing Is Bitter	Crooked Lane Books	Finalist	
LGBTQ Mystery	Rob Osler	The Case of the Missing Maid	Kensington Publishing Corporation	Finalist	
LGBTQ Mystery	Lev A. C. Rosen	Mirage City	Minotaur Books	Finalist	
LGBTQ Mystery	Hayley Scrivenor	Girl Falling	Flatiron Books	Finalist	
LGBTQ Nonfiction	Gaar Adams	Guest Privileges: Queer Lives and Finding Home in the Middle East	Dzanc Books	Winner	
LGBTQ Nonfiction	Sarah Aziza	The Hollow Half: A Memoir of Bodies and Borders	Catapult	Finalist	
LGBTQ Nonfiction	Nicholas Boggs	Baldwin: A Love Story	Farrar, Straus and Giroux	Finalist	
LGBTQ Nonfiction	Anthony Delaney	Queer Enlightenments: A Hidden History of Lovers, Lawbreakers, and Homemakers	Grove Atlantic	Finalist	
LGBTQ Nonfiction	Elizabeth Lovatt	Thank You for Calling the Lesbian Line	Legacy Lit	Finalist	
LGBTQ Poetry	jason b. crawford	Yeet!	Omnidawn	Winner	
LGBTQ Poetry	Eli Clare	Unfurl: Survivals, Sorrows, and Dreaming	Duke University Press	Finalist	
LGBTQ Poetry	Qurat Dar	Non-Prophet	icehouse poetry	Finalist	
LGBTQ Poetry	heidi andrea restrepo rhodes	Wayward Creatures	Host Publications	Finalist	
LGBTQ Poetry	Stacey Waite	A Real Man Would Have a Gun: Poems	University of New Mexico Press	Finalist	
LGBTQ Speculative Fiction	Ilana Masad	Beings	Bloomsbury Publishing	Winner	
LGBTQ Speculative Fiction	Seth Haddon	Volatile Memory	Tordotcom	Finalist	
LGBTQ Speculative Fiction	Elaine Ho	Cry, Voidbringer	Left Unread	Finalist	
LGBTQ Speculative Fiction	Cory O'Brien	Two Truths and a Lie	Pantheon Books	Finalist	
LGBTQ Speculative Fiction	Johanna van Veen	Blood on Her Tongue	Sourcebooks, Poisoned Pen Press	Finalist	
LGBTQ Studies	Sarah Ensor	Queer Lasting: Ecologies of Care for a Dying World	New York University Press	Winner	
LGBTQ Studies	Joseph J. Fischel	Sodomy's Solicitations: A Right to Queerness	Temple University Press	Finalist	
LGBTQ Studies	Kareem Khubchandani, with LaWhore Vagistan	Lessons in Drag: A Queer Manual for Academics, Artists, and Aunties	Brandeis University Press	Finalist	
LGBTQ Studies	Eithne Luibhéid	Abolitionist Intimacies: Queer and Trans Migrants against the Deportation State	Duke University Press	Finalist	
LGBTQ Studies	Iain Morland	Intersex: A Manifesto Against Medicalization	Columbia University Press	Finalist	
LGBTQ Young Adult	Riley Redgate	Come Home to My Heart	Union Square & Co.	Winner	
LGBTQ Young Adult	Rob Costello	An Ugly World for Beautiful Boys	Lethe Press	Finalist	
LGBTQ Young Adult	Logan-Ashley Kisner	The Transition	Delacorte Press	Finalist	
LGBTQ Young Adult	Corey Liu	He's So Possessed with Me	Little, Brown Books for Young Readers	Finalist	
LGBTQ Young Adult	Miriam Zoila Pérez	Camila Núñez's Year of Disasters	Page Street Publishing	Finalist	
Transgender Fiction	Milo Todd	The Lilac People	Counterpoint Press	Winner	
Transgender Fiction	Zee Carlstrom	Make Sure You Die Screaming	Flatiron Books	Finalist	
Transgender Fiction	Haden Cross	The Uncontinented Stars	Self-published	Finalist	
Transgender Fiction	Emily St. James	Woodworking	Crooked Media Reads	Finalist	
Transgender Fiction	Mattilda Bernstein Sycamore	Terry Dactyl	Coffee House Press	Finalist	
Transgender Nonfiction	Jennifer Finney Boylan	Cleavage: Men, Women, and the Space Between Us	Celadon	Winner	
Transgender Nonfiction	Zefyr Lisowski	Uncanny Valley Girls	Harper Perennial	Finalist	
Transgender Nonfiction	Mirha-Soleil Ross	Gendertrash From Hell: The First Print Collection of the Zine That Changed Everything	LittlePuss Press	Finalist	
Transgender Nonfiction	Denne Michele Norris with Electric Literature	Both/And	HarperOne	Finalist	
Transgender Nonfiction	Tourmaline	Marsha: The Joy and Defiance of Marsha P. Johnson	Tiny Reparations Press	Finalist	
Transgender Poetry	Roque Raquel Salas Rivera	Algarabía – The Song of Cenex, Natural Son of the Isle Alarabíyya	Graywolf	Winner	
Transgender Poetry	Golden	Reprise: Poems and Photographs	Haymarket Books	Finalist	
Transgender Poetry	Jzl Jmz	Local Woman	Nightboat Books	Finalist	
Transgender Poetry	Rickey Laurentiis	Death of the First Idea: Poems	Alfred A. Knopf	Finalist	
Transgender Poetry	jaye simpson	a body more tolerable	Arsenal Pulp	Finalist	
