= Lambda Literary Award for Children's and Young Adult Literature =

American literary award for LGBT children's books

The Lambda Literary Awards (also known as the "Lammys") are awarded yearly by the US-based Lambda Literary Foundation to published works that celebrate or explore LGBT (lesbian, gay, bisexual, transgender) themes. The organization is considered to be one of the main promoters of new and emerging LGBT writers.

The Lambda Literary Award for Children's and Young Adult Literature, one of the Lammys 25 awards, was introduced during the 2nd Lambda Literary Awards, when it was called "Young Adult/Children's Book Award". After not being present in the 1991 ceremonies, the award returned in the 4th edition under the name "Children's/Young Adult Literature". Starting in 2007, it has been known as the "LGBTQ Children's/Young Adult" award.

The 25th Lambda Literary Awards had a record number of submissions at the time. Due to the increased number of books submitted for evaluation, the judges of every category were encouraged to submit more finalists. After that, and since the 26th edition, if the number of submissions is high enough, the Children's/Young Adult category is divided in two subcategories, "Children's/Middle Grade" and "Young Adult", which happened in the 2020 and 2021 editions.

== Recipients ==
David Levithan has won the award a total of three times, in 2004, 2007 and 2014, and was nominated another three times. Jacqueline Woodson has been awarded two Lammys in this category, in 1996 and 1998. As of 2020, Kacen Callender, which published This is Kind of an Epic Love Story and Hurricane Child both in 2018, is the only author to have two nominations for the same year. Hurricane Child was also the winner on that same year.

Key
C	"Children's/Middle Grade" nominee/winner	M	"Middle Grade" nominee/winner	YA	"Young Adult" nominee/winner
ill.	Illustrator	ed.	Editor		
	Winner				

Lambda Literary Award for Children's and Young Adult Literature winners and finalists
Year	Contributor(s)	Title	Publisher	Result	Ref.
1990	MaryKate Jordan	Losing Uncle Tim	Albert Whitman & Co.	Winner	
1990	Lesléa Newman with Diane Souza (ill.)	Heather Has Two Mommies	In Other Words Press	Finalist	
1990	A. M. Homes	Jack	Macmillan	Finalist	
1990	George Shannon	Unlived Affections	Harper & Row Juvenile	Finalist	
1990	Susan and Daniel Cohen	When Someone You Know Is Gay	Evans	Finalist	
1992	Johnny Valentine with Lynette Schmidt (ill.)	The Duke Who Outlawed Jelly Beans: and Other Stories	Alyson Wonderland	Winner	
1992	Lesléa Newman with Russel Crocker (ill.)	Gloria Goes to Gay Pride	Alyson Wonderland	Finalist	
1992	Ann Heron and Meredith Maran with Kris Kovick (ill.)	How Would You Feel if Your Dad was Gay?	Alyson Wonderland	Finalist	
1992	Nancy Garden	Lark in the Morning	Farrar Straus Giroux	Finalist	
1992	Aaron and Walter Frickle	Sudden Strangers	St. Martin's Press	Finalist	
1993	Penny Raife Durant	When Heroes Die	Atheneum	Winner	
1993	Joan Alden with Catherine Hopkins (ill.)	A Boy's Best Friend	Alyson Wonderland	Finalist	
1993	Joan Alden with Catherine Hopkins (ill.)	Day They Put a Tax on Rainbows	Alyson Wonderland	Finalist	
1993	Bette Greene	Drowning of Stephan Jones	Bantam Books	Finalist	
1993	Johnny Valentine with Lynette Schmidt (ill.)	The Daddy Machine	Alyson Wonderland	Finalist	
1994	Hilary Mullins	The Cat Came Back	Naiad Press	Winner	
1994	Christina Salat	Living In Secret	Bantam Books	Finalist	
1994	Lesléa Newman with Annete Hegel (ill.)	Saturday is Pattyday	New Victoria	Finalist	
1994	Michael Willhoite	Uncle What-Is-It Is Coming To Visit	Alyson Wonderland	Finalist	
1994	Rik Isensee	We're Not Alone	Lavender Press	Finalist	
1995	Marion Dane Bauer (ed.)	Am I Blue?	Harper Children's	Winner	
1995	Ann Heron (ed.)	2 Teenagers In 20	Alyson Books	Finalist	
1995	Stacey Donovan	Dive	Dutton Children's Books	Finalist	
1995	Scott Nunokawa	Oscar Wilde	Chelsea House / Infobase Publishing	Finalist	
1995	Patricia Quinlan	Tiger Flowers	Dial Press	Finalist	
1996	Jacqueline Woodson	From the Notebooks of Melanin Sun	Blue Sky Press	Winner	
1996	Francesca Lia Block	Baby Be-Bop	HarperCollins	Finalist	
1996	Judith Vinga	My Two Uncles	Albert Whitman & Co.	Finalist	
1996	Kust Chandler	Passage of Pride	Times Books	Finalist	
1996	Daniel Vilmure	Toby's Lie	Simon & Schuster	Finalist	
1997	Nancy Garden	Good Moon Rising	Farrar Straus Giroux	Winner	
1997	Michael Willhoite	Daddy's Wedding	Alyson Books	Finalist	
1997	Elle Bass and Kate Kaufman	Free Your Mind	Harper Perennial	Finalist	
1997	Earl Alexander	My Dad Has HIV	Fairview Press	Finalist	
1997	Michael Thomas Ford	The World Out There	The New Press	Finalist	
1998	Jacqueline Woodson	The House You Pass On the Way	Delacorte Press / Dell Publishing	Winner	
1998	Jeanne Arnold	Amy Asks a Question: Grandma, What's a Lesbian?	Mother Courage	Finalist	
1998	Liza Ketchum	Blue Coyote	Simon & Schuster	Finalist	
1998	Paul Monette	Sanctuary: a Tale of Life in the Woods	Scribner	Finalist	
1998	Adam Mastoon	The Shared Heart	William Morrow and Company	Finalist	
1999	Kevin Jennings	Telling Tales Out of School	Alyson Books	Winner	
1999	Francesca Lia Block	I Was a Teenage Fairy	HarperCollins	Finalist	
1999	Joseph Kennedy with John Canemaker (ill.)	Lucy Goes to the Country	Alyson Books	Finalist	
1999	Michael Thomas Ford	Outspoken	Morrow Junior Books	Finalist	
1999	Clifford Chase	Queer 13	Weisbach	Finalist	
2000	Ellen Wittlinger	Hard Love	Simon & Schuster	Winner	
2000	Paula Boock	Dare Truth or Promise		Finalist	
2000	Lois-Ann Yamanaka	Name Me Nobody		Finalist	
2000	William Taylor	The Blue Lawn		Finalist	
2000	Nancy Garden	The Year They Burned the Books		Finalist	
2001	Noelle Howey and Ellen Samuels (eds.)	Out of the Ordinary	St. Martin's Press	Winner	
2001	Jean Ferris	Eight Seconds	Harcourt	Finalist	
2001	Nancy Garden	Holly's Secret	Farrar Straus Giroux	Finalist	
2001	Amy Sonnie (ed.)	Revolutionary Voices	Alyson Books	Finalist	
2001	Benjie Nycum	The XY Survival Guide	XY	Finalist	
2002	Julia Watts	Finding H.F.	Alyson Books	Winner	
2002	Sara Ryan	Empress of the World	Viking Press	Finalist	
2002	Marilyn Reynolds	Love Rules	Morning Glory	Finalist	
2002	Alex Sánchez	Rainbow Boys	Simon & Schuster	Finalist	
2002	Todd Turtle	Spot	Window	Finalist	
2003	Bonnie Shimko	Letters in the Attic	Academy Chicago Press	Winner	
2003	Lesléa Newman	Felicia's Favorite Story	Two Lives Publishing	Finalist	
2003	Linda de Haan and Stern Nijland	King & King	Ten Speed Press	Finalist	
2003	Andrew Calimach	Lover's Legends: The Gay Greek Myths	Simon & Schuster	Finalist	
2003	Harvey Fierstein	The Sissy Duckling	Simon & Schuster	Finalist	
2004	David Levithan	Boy Meets Boy	Knopf Books for Young Readers	Winner	
2004	Brent Hartinger	Geography Club	HarperTempest	Finalist	
2004	Tea Benduhn	Gravel Queen	Simon & Schuster	Finalist	
2004	Julie Anne Peters	Keeping You a Secret	Little, Brown and Company	Finalist	
2004	Alex Sánchez	Rainbow High	Simon & Schuster	Finalist	
2005	Alex Sánchez	So Hard to Say	Simon & Schuster	Winner	
2005	Julie Anne Peters	Luna	Little, Brown and Company	Finalist	
2005	Sharon Dennis Wyeth	Orphea Proud	Delacorte Press / Dell Publishing	Finalist	
2005	Judy MacLean	Rosemary and Juliet	Alice Street Editions	Finalist	
2005	David Levithan	The Realm of Possibility	Knopf Books for Young Readers	Finalist	
2006	Shyam Selvadurai	Swimming in the Monsoon Sea	Tundra Publishing	Winner	
2006	Peter Parnell and Justin Richardson	And Tango Makes Three	Simon & Schuster	Finalist	
2006	Rigoberto González	Antonio's Card/La Tarjeta de Antonio	Lee & Low Books	Finalist	
2006	Alex Sánchez	Rainbow Road	Simon & Schuster	Finalist	
2006	James Howe	Totally Joe	Simon & Schuster	Finalist	
2007	David Levithan and Billy Merrell (eds.)	The Full Spectrum	Random House Children's Books	Winner	
2007	Julie Anne Peters	Between Mom & Jo	Little, Brown and Company	Finalist	
2007	Kim Wallace	Erik & Isabelle's Junior Year at Foresthill High	Foglight Press	Finalist	
2007	Brian Sloan	Tale of Two Summers	Simon & Schuster	Finalist	
2007	Christian Burch	The Manny Files	Simon & Schuster	Finalist	
2008	Perry Moore	Hero	Hyperion Books	Winner	
2008	James St. James	Freak Show	Dutton Children's Books	Finalist	
2008	Ellen Wittlinger	Parrotfish	Simon & Schuster	Finalist	
2008	Patrick Ryan	Saints of Augustine	HarperTeen	Finalist	
2008	Peter Cameron	Someday This Pain Will Be Useful to You	Farrar Straus Giroux	Finalist	
2009	Bill Konigsberg	Out of the Pocket	Dutton Children's Books	Winner	
2009	Christian Burch	Hit the Road, Manny: A Manny Files Novel	Simon & Schuster	Finalist	
2009	David Levithan	How They Met & Other Stories	Knopf Children's Books	Finalist	
2009	Ellen Wittlinger	Love & Lies: Marisol's Story	Simon & Schuster	Finalist	
2009	Pat Schmatz	Mousetraps	Carolrhoda Books / Lerner Publishing Group	Finalist	
2009	Martin Wilson	What They Always Tell Us	Random House Children's Books	Finalist	
2010	Dale Peck	Sprout	Bloomsbury Publishing	Winner	
2010	Malinda Lo	Ash	Little, Brown and Company	Finalist	
2010	Michael Cart (ed.)	How Beautiful the Ordinary	HarperCollins	Finalist	
2010	Patrick Ryan	In Mike We Trust	HarperCollins	Finalist	
2010	Nick Burd	The Vast Fields of Ordinary	Penguin Books	Finalist	
2011	Jane Eagland	Wildthorn	Houghton Mifflin Harcourt	Winner	
2011	Justin Richardson and Peter Parnell with Amy June Bates (ill.)	Christian, the Hugging Lion	Simon & Schuster	Finalist	
2011	Vivek Shraya with Juliana Neufeld (ill.)	God Loves Hair	Vivek Shraya	Finalist	
2011	Catherine Ryan Hyde	Jumpstart the World	Random House Books for Children	Finalist	
2011	James Klise	Love Drugged	Flux Books / Llewellyn Worldwide	Finalist	
2012	Bil Wright	Putting Makeup on the Fat Boy	Simon & Schuster	Winner	
2012	Patrick Ryan	Gemini Bites	Scholastic	Finalist	
2012	Malinda Lo	Huntress	Little, Brown Books for Young Readers	Finalist	
2012	Cris Beam	I am J	Little, Brown Books for Young Readers	Finalist	
2012	Lili Wilkinson	PINK	HarperCollins	Finalist	
2013	Benjamin Alire Saenz	Aristotle and Dante Discover the Secrets of the Universe	Simon & Schuster	Winner	
2013	Malinda Lo	Adaptation	Little, Brown Books for Young Readers	Finalist	
2013	A. S. King	Ask the Passengers	Little, Brown Books for Young Readers	Finalist	
2013	Kirstin Cronn-Mills	Beautiful Music for Ugly Children	Flux Books / Llewellyn Worldwide	Finalist	
2013	David Levithan	Every Day	Knopf Books for Young Readers	Finalist	
2013	Elissa Janine Hoole	Kiss the Morning Star	Amazon Children's Publishing	Finalist	
2013	E. M. Kokie	Personal Effects	Candlewick Press	Finalist	
2013	Molly Beth Griffin	Silhouette of a Sparrow	Milkweed Editions	Finalist	
2013	S. Bear Bergman and Suzy Malik	The Adventure of Tulip, Birthday Wish Fairy	Flamingo Rampant	Finalist	
2013	Emily M. Danforth	The Miseducation of Cameron Post	Balzer + Bray / HarperCollins	Finalist	
2014	Sara Farizan	If You Could Be Mine	Algonquin Books / Workman Publishing Company	Winner	
2014	David Levithan	Two Boys Kissing	Knopf Books for Young Readers	Winner	
2014	Tim Federle	Better Nate Than Ever	Simon & Schuster	Finalist	
2014	Christopher R. Michael	Boy In Box	Hubbub Publishing	Finalist	
2014	Rhiannon Argo	Girls I've Run Away With	Moonshine Press	Finalist	
2014	Bill Konigsberg	Openly Straight	Arthur A. Levine Books / Scholastic Corporation	Finalist	
2014	Stewart Lewis with Rebecca Short (ed.)	The Secret Ingredient	Delacorte Press / Dell Publishing	Finalist	
2014	Alaya Dawn Johnson	The Summer Prince	Arthur A. Levine Books / Scholastic	Finalist	
2014	Cory Silverberg with Fiona Smyth (ill.)	What Makes a Baby	Triangle Square / Seven Stories Press	Finalist	
2015	Tim Federle	Five, Six, Seven, Nate!	Simon & Schuster	Winner	
2015	Susan Kuklin	Beyond Magenta: Transgender Teens Speak Out	Candlewick Press	Finalist	
2015	Bridget Birdsall	Double Exposure	Skyhorse Publishing	Finalist	
2015	Karelia Stetz-Waters	Forgive Me If I've Told You This Before	Ooligan Press	Finalist	
2015	Robin Talley	Lies We Tell Ourselves	Harlequin Teen	Finalist	
2015	Jay Jordan Hawke	Pukawiss the Outcast	Harmony Ink Press /Dreamspinner Press	Finalist	
2015	Suki Fleet	This is Not a Love Story	Harmony Ink Press /Dreamspinner Press	Finalist	
2015	Raziel Reid	When Everything Feels Like the Movies	Arsenal Pulp Press	Finalist	
2016	Alex Gino	Melissa	Scholastic	Winner	
2016	Sarah McCarry	About a Girl: A Novel	St. Martin's Griffin	Finalist	
2016	Will Walton	Anything Could Happen	Push	Finalist	
2016	Jerome Pohlen	Gay and Lesbian History for Kids: The Century-Long Struggle for LGBT Rights	Chicago Review Press	Finalist	
2016	Adam Silvera	More Happy Than Not	Soho Press	Finalist	
2016	I. W. Gregorio	None of the Above	Balzer + Bray / HarperCollins	Finalist	
2016	Becky Albertalli	Simon vs. the Homo Sapiens Agenda	Balzer + Bray / HarperCollins	Finalist	
2016	Brian Selznick	The Marvels	Scholastic	Finalist	
2017	M-E Girard	Girl Mans Up	HarperTeen	Winner	
2017	Brie Spangler	Beast	Alfred A. Knopf	Finalist	
2017	Juliann Rich	Gravity	Bold Stroke Books	Finalist	
2017	John Corey Whaley	Highly Illogical Behavior	Dial Press	Finalist	
2017	C. B. Lee	Not Your Sidekick	Novelstream	Finalist	
2017	Krystal Sutherland	Our Chemical Hearts	G.P. Putnam's Sons Books for Young Readers	Finalist	
2017	Jeff Garvin	Symptoms of Being Human	Balzer + Bray / HarperCollins	Finalist	
2017	Marie Lu	The Midnight Star	G.P. Putnam's Sons Books for Young Readers	Finalist	
2018	Rebecca Podos	Like Water	Balzer + Bray / HarperCollins	Winner	
2018	Sarah Dooley	Ashes to Asheville	Putnam	Finalist	
2018	Christina Lauren	Autoboyography	Simon & Schuster	Finalist	
2018	April Daniels	Dreadnought: Nemesis	Diversion Books	Finalist	
2018	Nina Packebush	Girls Like Me	Bedazzled Ink	Finalist	
2018	Kay Haring with Robert Neubecker (ill.)	Keith Haring: The Boy Who Just Kept Drawing	Dial Press	Finalist	
2018	Will Kostakis	The Sidekicks	Harlequin Teen	Finalist	
2018	Martin Wilson	We Now Return to Regular Life	Dial Press	Finalist	
2019	Kacen Callender	Hurricane Child	Scholastic	Winner	
2019	Mark Oshiro	Anger Is a Gift	Tor Teen / Tor Books	Finalist	
2019	Adib Khorram	Darius the Great Is Not Okay	Dial Press	Finalist	
2019	Ashley Herring Blake	Girl Made of Stars	Houghton Mifflin Harcourt	Finalist	
2019	Claire Legrand	Sawkill Girls	Katherine Tegen Books	Finalist	
2019	Angelo Surmelis	The Dangerous Art of Blending In	Balzer + Bray / HarperCollins	Finalist	
2019	Elizabeth Acevedo	The Poet X	HarperTeen	Finalist	
2019	Kacen Callender	This Is Kind of an Epic Love Story	Balzer + Bray / HarperCollins	Finalist	
2020	Lisa Jenn Bigelow	Hazel's Theory of Evolution	HarperCollins	Winner (C)	
2020	Alexandra Villasante	The Grief Keeper	G.P. Putnam's Sons Books for Young Readers	Winner (Y)	
2020	Saundra Mitchell	All the Things We Do in the Dark	HarperTeen	Finalist	
2020	Nicole Melleby	Hurricane Season	Algonquin Young Readers	Finalist	
2020	Akwaeke Emezi	Pet	Make Me a World / Random House	Finalist	
2020	Robin Stevenson	Pride Colors	Orca Book Publishers	Finalist	
2020	Jaye Robin Brown	The Meaning of Birds	HarperTeen	Finalist	
2020	Rory Power	Wilder Girls	Delacorte Press	Finalist	
2021	Kacen Callender	King and the Dragonflies	Scholastic	Winner (C)	
2021	Mike Curato	Flamer	Henry Holt Books for Young Readers	Winner (Y)	
2021	Phil Bildner	A High Five for Glenn Burke	Farrar, Straus and Giroux Books for Young Readers	Finalist	
2021	Lev A. C. Rosen	Camp	Little, Brown Books for Young Readers	Finalist	
2021	Vincent Kirsch	From Archie to Zack	Abrams Books for Young Readers	Finalist	
2021	Peter Mercurio and Leo Espinosa	Our Subway Baby	Dial Press	Finalist	
2021	Agnes Borinsky	Sasha Masha	Farrar, Straus and Giroux Books for Young Readers	Finalist	
2021	Niki Smith	The Deep & Dark Blue	Little, Brown Books for Young Readers	Finalist	
2021	Trung Le Nguyen	The Magic Fish	Random House Graphic	Finalist	
2021	Leah Johnson	You Should See Me in a Crown	Scholastic	Finalist	
2022	JR Ford and Vanessa Ford	Calvin	G.P. Putnam's Sons Books for Young Readers	Winner (C)	
2022	Ashley Herring Blake	Hazel Bly and the Deep Blue Sea	Little, Brown Books for Young Readers	Finalist (C)	
2022	Charlotte Sullivan Wild with Charlene Chua (illus.)	Love, Violet	Farrar, Straus and Giroux	Finalist (C)	
2022	Rob Sanders	Stitch by Stitch: Cleve Jones and the AIDS Memorial Quilt	APA Magination Press	Finalist (C)	
2022	Basil Sylvester and Kevin Sylvester	The Fabulous Zed Watson!	HarperCollins Publishers	Finalist (C)	
2022	A. R. Capetta	The Heartbreak Bakery	Candlewick Press	Winner (Y)	
2022	Adiba Jaigirdar	Hani and Ishu's Guide to Fake Dating	Page Street Kids	Finalist (Y)	
2022	Aden Polydoros	The City Beautiful	Harlequin Trade Publishing/Inkyard	Finalist (Y)	
2022	Isaac Fitzsimons	The Passing Playbook	Dial Books for Young Readers	Finalist (Y)	
2022	Linsey Miller	What We Devour	Sourcebooks Fire	Finalist (Y)	
2023	Wallace West	Mighty Red Riding Hood	Little, Brown Books for Young Readers	Winner (C)	
2023	Carole Boston Weatherford and Rob Sanders with Byron McCray (ill.)	A Song for the Unsung: Bayard Rustin	Henry Holt Books for Young Readers	Finalist (C)	
2023	Hinaleimoana Wong-Kalu, Dean Hamer, and Joe Wilson, illus. by Daniel Sousa	Kapaemahu	Kokila	Finalist (C)	
2023	Nina LaCour	Mama and Mommy and Me in the Middle	Candlewick Press	Finalist (C)	
2023	Robb Pearlman, illus. by Dani Jones	The Sublime Ms. Stacks	Bloomsbury Publishing	Finalist (C)	
2023	Maulik Pancholy	Nikhil Out Loud	HarperCollins/Balzer + Bray	Winner (M)	
2023	David Levithan	Answers In the Pages	Alfred A. Knopf Books for Young Readers	Finalist (M)	
2023	Kyle Lukoff	Different Kinds of Fruit	Dial Books for Young Readers	Finalist (M)	
2023	Maggie Horne	Hazel Hill Is Gonna Win This One	HarperCollins/Clarion Books	Finalist (M)	
2023	Michael Leali	The Civil War of Amos Abernathy	HarperCollins	Finalist (M)	
2023	Sonora Reyes	The Lesbiana's Guide to Catholic School	Balzer + Bray/HarperCollins	Winner (Y)	
2023	Vincent Tirado	Burn Down, Rise Up	Sourcebooks	Finalist (Y)	
2023	Angeline Jackson with Susan McClelland	Funny Gyal: My Fight Against Homophobia in Jamaica	Dundurn Press	Finalist (Y)	
2023	Anna-Marie McLemore	Lakelore	Feiwel & Friends	Finalist (Y)	
2023	Jen Ferguson	The Summer of Bitter and Sweet	Heartdrum/HarperCollins	Finalist (Y)	
2024	Nina LaCour, with Sonia Albert (ill.)	The Apartment House on Poppy Hill	Chronicle Books	Winner (C)	
2024	Meeg Pincus and Meridth Mckean Gimbel	Door by Door	Crown Books for Young Readers	Finalist (C)	
2024	Andy Passchier	Gender Identity for Kids	Little, Brown Books for Young Readers	Finalist (C)	
2024	Harry Woodgate	Grandad's Pride	Little Bee Books	Finalist (C)	
2024	A. J. Irving with Kip Alizadeh (ill.)	The Wishing Flower	Knopf Books for Young Readers	Finalist (C)	
2024	Robin Gow	Dear Mothman	Amulet Books	Winner (M)	
2024	Leah Johnson	Ellie Engle Saves Herself	Disney Hyperion	Finalist (M)	
2024	Karen Wilfrid	Just Lizzie	HarperCollins / Clarion Books	Finalist (M)	
2024	Michael Leali	Matteo	HarperCollins	Finalist (M)	
2024	Alder Van Otterloo	The Beautiful Something Else	Scholastic Press	Finalist (M)	
2024	Abdi Nazemian	Only This Beautiful Moment	HarperCollins / Balzer + Bray	Winner (Y)	
2024	Maxine Rae	Cold Girls	Flux Books	Finalist (Y)	
2024	Keith F. Miller, Jr.	Pritty	HarperCollins / HarperTeen	Finalist (Y)	
2024	Brittany N. Williams	That Self-Same Metal	Amulet Books	Finalist (Y)	
2024	Gabe Cole Novoa	The Wicked Bargain	Random House Books for Young Readers	Finalist (Y)	
2025	Phil Bildner with Daniel J. O'Brien (ill.)	Glenn Burke, Game Changer: The Man Who Invented the High Five	Farrar, Straus and Giroux Books for Young Readers	Winner (C)	
2025	Seamus Kirst	Harper Becomes a Big Sister	American Psychological Association Magination Press	Finalist (C)	
2025	Sarah Hoffman and Ian Hoffman	Jacob's Missing Book	American Psychological Association Magination Press	Finalist (C)	
2025	Molly Beth Griffin with Anait Semirdzhyan (ill.)	Just Us	Charlesbridge	Finalist (C)	
2025	Lee Wind with Jieting Chen (ill.)	Love of the Half-Eaten Peach	Reycraft	Finalist (C)	
2025	Elisa Stone Leahy	Mallory in Full Color	Quill Tree Books | HarperCollins	Winner (M)	
2025	Taylor Tracy	Murray Out of Water	HarperCollins	Finalist (M)	
2025	Maggie Horne	Noah Frye Gets Crushed	HarperCollins	Finalist (M)	
2025	Marieke Nijkamp	Splinter & Ash	Greenwillow Books | HarperCollins	Finalist (M)	
2025	Justine Pucella Winans	Wishbone	Bloomsbury	Finalist (M)	
2025	K. Ancrum	Icarus	HarperCollins	Winner (Y)	
2025	Logan-Ashley Kisner	Old Wounds	Random House Children's Books	Finalist (Y)	
2025	Kamilah Cole	So Let Them Burn	Little, Brown Books for Young Readers	Finalist (Y)	
2025	H. A. Clarke	The Feast Makers	Erewhon Books	Finalist (Y)	
2025	Chatham Greenfield	Time and Time Again	Bloomsbury	Finalist (Y)	
2026	Jerrold Connors	JIM! Six True Stories about One Great Artist: James Marshall	Dial Books for Young Readers	Winner (C)	
2026	Simon James Green	A Year of Pride and Joy	Magic Cat	Finalist (C)	
2026	Alana Tyson with Ebony Glenn (ill.)	Devin's Gift	Philomel	Finalist (C)	
2026	Vincent X. Kirsch	O.K. Is Gay	Abrams Books for Young Readers	Finalist (C)	
2026	Pete Jordi Wood	Tales from Beyond the Rainbow	Penguin Young Readers	Finalist (C)	
2026	A. J. Irving with Cynthia Alonso (ill.)	The Bi Book	Alfred A. Knopf Books for Young Readers	Finalist (C)	
2026	Rainie Oet	Glitch Girl!	Penguin Young Readers	Winner (M)	
2026	K. O'Neill	A Song for You and I	Random House Graphic	Finalist (M)	
2026	Andrea Beatriz Arango	It's All or Nothing, Vale	Random House Books for Young Readers	Finalist (M)	
2026	Taylor Tracy	Pasta Girls	HarperCollins – Quill Tree Books	Finalist (M)	
2026	Kyle Casey Chu	The Queen Bees of Tybee County	HarperCollins – Quill Tree Books	Finalist (M)	
2026	Riley Redgate	Come Home to My Heart	Union Square & Co.	Winner (Y)	
2026	Rob Costello	An Ugly World for Beautiful Boys	Lethe Press	Finalist (Y)	
2026	Miriam Zoila Pérez	Camila Núñez's Year of Disasters	Page Street Publishing	Finalist (Y)	
2026	Corey Liu	He's So Possessed with Me	Little, Brown Books for Young Readers	Finalist (Y)	
2026	Logan-Ashley Kisner	The Transition	Delacorte Press	Finalist (Y)	
