= 25th Lambda Literary Awards =

2013 literary awards ceremony

The 25th Lambda Literary Awards were held on June 3, 2013, to honor works of LGBT literature published in 2012.

Yolanda Wallace became the first African-American writer to win the Lesbian Romance category with her win for Month of Sundays. Tom Léger and Riley MacLeod, co-editors of the anthology The Collection: Short Fiction from the Transgender Vanguard, were the first transgender authors to win the Transgender Fiction award. 2013 was also the first year in the history of the awards that the Transgender Fiction award was both presented by and accepted by trans authors.

== Special awards ==
| Category | Winner |
|---|---|
| Bridge Builder Award | John Irving |
| Pioneer Award | Cherrie Moraga, Malcolm Boyd, Lillian Faderman, Katherine V. Forrest, John Rechy, Patricia Nell Warren |
| Trustee Award | Augusten Burroughs |
| Betty Berzon Emerging Writer Award | Carter Sickels, Sassafras Lowrey |
| Jim Duggins Outstanding Mid-Career Novelists' Prize | Trebor Healey, Nicola Griffith |

== Nominees and winners ==
| Category | Winner | Nominated |
|---|---|---|
| Bisexual Literature | Cheryl Burke, My Awesome Place: The Autobiography of Cheryl B John Irving, In One Person | Janet W. Hardy, Girlfag: A Life Told in Sex and Musicals; Richard Mason, History of a Pleasure Seeker; Scotty-Miguel Sandoe, Axel Hooley’s Death Watch List |
| Gay Erotica | Mykola Dementiuk, The Facialist | Todd Gregory, ed. Raising Hell: Demonic Gay Erotica; Lukas Hand, Coming To: A Collection of Erotic and Other Epiphanies; William Holden, Secret Societies; Jerry L. Wheeler, Strawberries and Other Erotic Fruits |
| Gay Fiction | Benjamin Alire Sáenz, Everything Begins and Ends at the Kentucky Club | Daniel Arsand, Lovers; John Boyne, The Absolutist; Trebor Healey, A Horse Named Sorrow; Kevin Killian, Spreadeagle; Richard Kramer, These Things Happen; Paul Lisicky, Unbuilt Projects; Michael Lowenthal, The Paternity Test; William Jack Sibley, Sighs Too Deep For Words; Barry Webster, The Lava in My Bones |
| Gay Memoir/Biography | Cynthia Carr, Fire in the Belly: The Life and Times of David Wojnarowicz | Charles Rowan Beye, My Husband and My Wives: A Gay Man’s Odyssey; Ron Padgett, ed., The Collected Writings of Joe Brainard; Reynolds Price, Midstream: An Unfinished Memoir; Kamal Al-Solaylee, Intolerable: A Memoir of Extremes; Mutsuo Takahashi (tr. Jeffrey Angles), Twelve Views from the Distance |
| Gay Mystery | Jeffrey Round, Lake on the Mountain | Anthony Bidulka, Dos Equis; Steve Neil Johnson, The Yellow Canary; Janice Law, Fires of London; Rod Shelton, Bokassa’s Last Apostle |
| Gay Poetry | Stephen S. Mills, He Do the Gay Man in Different Voices | Richard Blanco, Looking for the Gulf Motel; Eduardo C. Corral, Slow Lightning; Patrick Donnelly, Nocturnes of the Brothel of Ruin; Aaron Smith, Appetite |
| Gay Romance | Jay Bell, Kamikaze Boys | Brad Boney, The Nothingness of Ben; Barry Brennessel, The Celestial; William Masswa, Toughskins; J. H. Trumble, Don’t Let Me Go |
| Lesbian Erotica | D. L. King, The Harder She Comes: Butch/Femme Erotica | Ily Goyanes, ed., Girls Who Score: Hot Lesbian Erotica; Catt Kingsgrave, One Saved to the Sea |
| Lesbian Fiction | Thrity Umrigar, The World We Found | Carol Anshaw, Carry the One; Ellis Avery, The Last Nude; Jesse Blackadder, The Raven’s Heart; Catherine Jones, Wonder Girls; B. K. Loren, Theft |
| Lesbian Memoir/Biography | Jeanette Winterson, Why Be Happy When You Could Be Normal? | Alison Bechdel, Are You My Mother?; Lisa Cohen, All We Know: Three Lives; Judy Grahn, A Simple Revolution: The Making of an Activist Poet; Luisita Lopez Torregrosa, Before the Rain; Sarah Schulman, The Gentrification of the Mind: Witness to a Lost Imagination |
| Lesbian Mystery | J. M. Redmann, Ill Will | Ellen Hart, Rest for the Wicked; C. P. Rowlands, Jacob’s War; Robin Silverman, Lemon Reef |
| Lesbian Poetry | Etel Adnan, Sea and Fog | Julia Bloch, Letters to Kelly Clarkson; Marty McConnell, wine for a shotgun; Eileen Myles, snowflake/different streets; Kathryn L. Pringle, fault tree |
| Lesbian Romance | Yolanda Wallace, Month of Sundays | Lesley Davis, Dark Wings Descending; Trin Denise, She Left Me Breathless; Yvonne Heidt, Sometime Yesterday; Q. Kelly, Third; Anne Laughlin, Runaway; Lynette Mae, Tactical Pursuit; Chris Paynter, Survived by Her Longtime Companion; Ali Vali, Love Match; Kieran York, Appointment with a Smile |
| LGBT Anthology | Justin Hall, No Straight Lines: Four Decades of Queer Comics | Audrey Bilger and Michele Kort, Here Come the Brides!: Reflections on Lesbian Love and Marriage; Keith Boykin, For Colored Boys Who Have Considered Suicide When The Rainbow Is Still Not Enough; Mattilda Bernstein Sycamore, Why Are Faggots So Afraid of Faggots? Flaming Challenges to Masculinity, Objectification, and the Desire to Conform |
| LGBT Children's/Young Adult | Benjamin Alire Sáenz, Aristotle and Dante Discover the Secrets of the Universe | S. Bear Bergman and Suzy Malik, The Adventure of Tulip, Birthday Wish Fairy; Kirstin Cronn-Mills, Beautiful Music for Ugly Children; Emily M. Danforth, The Miseducation of Cameron Post; Molly Beth Griffin, Silhouette of a Sparrow; Elissa Janine Hoole, Kiss the Morning Star; A.S. King, Ask the Passengers; E. M. Kokie, Personal Effects; David Levithan, Every Day; Malinda Lo, Adaptation |
| LGBT Debut Fiction | Mia McKenzie, The Summer We Got Free | Lania Knight, Three Cubic Feet; Alex Leslie, People Who Disappear; E. J. Levy, Love, In Theory; Lydia Perovic, Incidental Music; Kristen Ringman, Makara; Carter Sickels, The Evening Hour; Lysley Tenorio, Monstress; Jeanne Thornton, The Dream of Doctor Bantam; William Sterling Walker, Desire: Tales of New Orleans |
| LGBT Drama | David Greenspan, The Myopia and Other Plays | C. E. Gatchalian, Falling in Time; Jon Marans, A Strange and Separate People; A. Rey Pamatmat, Edith Can Shoot Things and Hit Them; A. Rey Pamatmat, Thunder Above, Deeps Below |
| LGBT Non-Fiction | Dale Carpenter, Flagrant Conduct: The Story of Lawrence v. Texas | Christopher Bram, Eminent Outlaws: The Gay Writers Who Changed America; Stacy Braukman, Communists and Perverts under the Palms: The Johns Committee in Florida, 1956-1965; T Cooper, Real Man Adventures; Michael G. Long, ed., I Must Resist: Bayard Rustin’s Life in Letters; Sarah Schulman, Israel/Palestine and the Queer International; Jeffrey Schwarz, Mark Thompson and Bo Young, Out Spoken: A Vito Russo Reader Reel One and Reel Two; Andrew Solomon, Far From the Tree: Parents, Children and the Search for Identity |
| LGBT Science Fiction/Fantasy/Horror | Tom Cardamone, Green Thumb | Sean Eads, The Survivors; Greg Herren and J.M. Redmann, Night Shadows: Queer Horror; H. B. Kurtzwilde, Chocolatiers of the High Winds; Lee Mandelo, Beyond Binary: Genderqueer and Sexually Fluid Speculative Fiction; Kelly Sinclair, In the Now; Connie Wilkins and Steve Berman, Heiresses of Russ 2012: the Year’s Best Lesbian Speculative Fiction |
| LGBT Studies | Ramón H. Rivera-Servera, Performing Queer Latinidad: Dance, Sexuality, Politics | Tracy Baim, Gay Press, Gay Power: The Growth of LGBT Community Newspapers in America; Bernadette C. Barton, Pray the Gay Away: The Extraordinary Lives of Bible Belt Gays; Ashley Currier, Out in Africa: LGBT Organizing in Namibia and South Africa; Ann Cvetkovich, Depression: A Public Feeling; David M. Halperin, How to Be Gay; Ernesto Javier Martínez, On Making Sense: Queer Race Narratives of Intelligibility; Brenna M. Munro, South Africa and the Dream of Love to Come: Queer Sexuality and the Struggle for Freedom; Louis-Georges Tin, The Invention of Heterosexual Culture; Sara Warner, Acts of Gaiety: LGBT Performance and the Politics of Pleasure |
| Transgender Fiction | Tom Léger and Riley MacLeod, eds., The Collection: Short Fiction from the Transgender Vanguard | Rachel Gold, Being Emily; Roz Kaveney, Dialectic of the Flesh; Michael Quadland, Offspring; Rae Spoon, First Spring Grass Fire |
| Transgender Non-Fiction | Anne Enke, Transfeminist Perspectives in and beyond Transgender and Gender Studies | Ryka Aoki, Seasonal Velocities; Dylan Edwards, Transposes; Matt Kailey, Teeny Weenies and Other Short Subjects |
