= Leali =

Leali is an Italian surname. Notable people with the surname include:

- Bruno Leali (born 1958), Italian cyclist
- Fausto Leali (born 1944), Italian singer
- Michael Leali, American writer and educator
- Nicola Leali (born 1993), Italian footballer
