= Lisa Jenn Bigelow =

American writer of children's books and young adult fiction

- Education: Carnegie Mellon University; University of Illinois Urbana-Champaign
- Occupation: Writer
- Writing career
- Genres: Children's books and young adult fiction

Lisa Jenn Bigelow is an American writer of children's books and young adult fiction. Her middle-grade novel Hazel's Theory of Evolution won the 2020 Lambda Literary Award for Children's and Young Adult Literature.

== Personal life ==
Bigelow was raised in Kalamazoo, Michigan. She currently lives near Chicago. She can play piano, guitar, and harmonica. Bigelow graduated from Carnegie Mellon University and the University of Illinois Urbana-Champaign.

== Career ==
While she's not writing, Bigelow works as a youth librarian in the Chicago metropolitan area.

=== Publications ===
- Starting from Here (September 2012)
- Drum Roll, Please (June 2018)
- Hazel’s Theory of Evolution (October 2019)
- This Is Our Rainbow (October 2021)

=== Awards and honors ===
Drum Roll, Please is a Junior Library Guild selection.

Awards and honors for Bigelow's writing
| Year | Title | Award/Honor | Result | Ref. |
|---|---|---|---|---|
| 2019 | Drum Roll, Please | American Library Association Rainbow List | Selection | |
| 2020 | Hazel’s Theory of Evolution | Lambda Literary Award for Children's and Young Adult Literature | Winner | |
| 2020 | Hazel’s Theory of Evolution | American Library Association Rainbow List | Selection | |
| 2020 | Hazel’s Theory of Evolution | AudioFile Earphones Award Winner | Winner | |
| 2013 | Starting from Here | American Library Association Rainbow List | Top 10 | |
