= Hazel's Theory of Evolution =

2019 novel by Lisa Jenn Bigelow

- First edition cover
- Author: Lisa Jenn Bigelow
- Language: English
- Genre: Young adult novel
- Publisher: HarperCollins
- Publication date: 2019
- Awards: Lambda Literary Award
- ISBN: 978-0-0627-9117-7

Hazel's Theory of Evolution is a young adult novel by Lisa Jenn Bigelow. In 2019 HarperCollins published the book, which received the Lambda Literary Award in 2020.

The novel tells the story of a middle school girl who struggles with adapting to many changes in her life, including her mother's pregnancy after many miscarriages and making new friends after switching schools. Bigelow tackles issues of change, identity, and family within the framework of the novel.

== Plot ==
The novel tells the story of Hazel Brownlee-Wellington, a thirteen-year-old girl who has just entered the eighth grade in a new school in Michigan. In the novel, she is well-versed in information about animals and she lived on a goat farm. Becca, Hazel's best friend, has distanced herself after she became a cheerleader, and Hazel has found it difficult to make new friends. After a while of being at a new school, she starts to hang out with Carina, a transgender girl, and Yosh, a wheelchair-using boy who is recognizable for his green mohawk. She later learns that one of her mothers is pregnant, but she is not hopeful because of two previous miscarriages. She hopes that a book called On the Origin of Species by Charles Darwin can help her make sense of her life, but she still struggles with many of her problems.

== Reception ==
Kirkus Reviews praised the diversity present in the book's cast. They also said that "[h]er first-person narration is insightful" and the main character is "highly likable." Publishers Weekly also praised the varied cast in Bigelow's book, as well as her "relatable first-person narrative", which the author uses to address universal conflicts.

Writing for the School Library Journal, Lisa Gieskes recommended the book, saying that "readers will find [Hazel's] sensitive, reflective nature heartening." Carolyn Phelan, for Booklist, called it "[a] heartfelt novel of family, friends, and change." Phelan also noted the author's skill at building up towards the climax, as well as her portrayal of empathetic characters.

Hazel's Theory of Evolution won the 2020 Lambda Literary Award in the "Children's/Middle Grade" category.
