= Putting Makeup on the Fat Boy =

2011 novel by Bil Wright

- Front cover
- Author: Bil Wright
- Language: English
- Genre: Young adult novel
- Publisher: Simon and Schuster
- Publication date: July 26, 2011
- Pages: 240
- Awards: Lambda Literary Award; Stonewall Book Award
- ISBN: 978-1-4169-3996-2

Putting Makeup on the Fat Boy is a 2011 young adult novel written by Bil Wright and published by Simon and Schuster. The book tells the story of Carlos Duarte, a gay teenager who dreams of becoming a famous makeup artist.

== Reception ==
A review for Publishers Weekly commended the protagonist Wright developed, saying "[he] gives voice, complexity, and heart to the kind of character often relegated to a cliché sidekick role." They also note the resilience of Carlos Duarte throughout the book serve as example to teenagers. Kirkus Reviews praised the author's treatment "of a gay, Latino teen" in Carlos Duarte, but criticized the way one of the characters, Angie, who is fat, was treated in the book.

The School Library Journal was mostly positive about the main character, calling him a "fascinating character", but also mentioning he could "overwhelm the plot and the other characters" at times, making them seem flat in comparison. The SLJ review also appreciated Duarte's narration due to it being "honest about the vagaries of real life and fabulousness."

Putting Makeup on the Fat Boy was the recipient of the Lambda Literary Award for Children's and Young Adult Literature and the Stonewall Book Award, both in 2012.
