= Maggie Horne =

Canadian author of children's literature

Maggie Horne is a Canadian author of children's literature. She is the author of Hazel Hill Is Gonna Win This One (2022), Don't Let It Break Your Heart (2024), Noah Frye Gets Crushed (2024), and Freddie and Stella Got Hot (2026).

In 2023, Hazel Hill Is Gonna Win This One was a finalist for the Lambda Literary Award for Middle Grade. Noah Frye Gets Crushed was a finalist for the same award in 2025.

Horne grew up near Toronto. As of January 2026, she lived in the United Kingdom with her wife and children.

== Publications ==
- Hazel Hill Is Gonna Win This One. Clarion. 2022. ISBN 978-0-358-66470-3.
- Don’t Let It Break Your Heart. Feiwel and Friends. 2024. ISBN 978-1-250-89497-7.
- Noah Frye Gets Crushed. Harper. 2024. ISBN 978-0-063-28519-4.
- Freddie and Stella Got Hot. Feiwel and Friends. 2026. ISBN 978-1-250-37737-1.
