= Tiger Flowers (book) =

1994 picture book

- Author: Patricia Quinlan
- Illustrator: Janet Wilson
- Publisher: Dial Books for Young Readers
- Publication date: May 1, 1994
- ISBN: 978-0-8037-1408-3

Tiger Flowers is a 1994 picture book written by Patricia Quinlan and illustrated by Janet Wilson. It tells the story of a young boy who reflects on his memories of his uncle who has recently died from AIDS. It was published by Dial Books for Young Readers on May 1, 1994. Critics generally praised the book for presenting the difficult topics of AIDS and death to a younger audience, as well as Wilson's illustrations. It was a finalist for the Lambda Literary Award for Children's and Young Adult Literature in 1995.

== Synopsis ==
Joel, a young boy, is grieving after the death of his uncle Michael from AIDS-related complications. As he explains the death to his younger sister Tara, he remembers the things he and Michael did together: building a tree house, planting tiger lilies in the garden, and attending a baseball game with Peter, Michael's companion. Michael had moved in with Joel's family after Peter died from AIDS. Joel is comforted by his mother, who tells him that the grief will fade with time. Unable to sleep one night, he visits the tree house and watches the sun rise on the tiger lilies. He picks one for Tara, telling her that the "tiger flowers" were Michael's favorite and will always be his favorite as well.

== Background and publication ==
Quinlan wrote Tiger Flowers to help children understand grief. She chose to focus on AIDS, rather than cancer or a death by natural causes, because there were relatively fewer children's books about the topic. The phrase "a dark place", describing Joel's grief, was changed to "a cold place" on the insistence of Quinlan's editor, who felt that the original phrase and Wilson's illustration of a silhouetted tree could potentially seem racially insensitive. Quinlan initially argued against the change but eventually agreed so that the book could be published, and Wilson modified the accompanying illustration. The book's illustrations are primarily in shades of green, yellow, and orange.

The book was published by Dial Books for Young Readers on May 1, 1994.

== Reception ==
Tiger Flowers was a finalist for the Lambda Literary Award for Children's and Young Adult Literature in 1995. It received mostly positive reviews from critics, who praised its attempts to present difficult topics, including AIDS and death, to children. Janice Del Negro of Booklist observed at the time that it was "one of a very few titles to address this very real issue for today's children". In a review for Canadian Literature, J. R. Wytenbroek agreed that the book would be a helpful resource for grieving children and described it as "sensitive and timely", though she felt that some parts of the story were too obvious. A reviewer for Publishers Weekly criticized the book for not placing a stronger focus on AIDS and homosexuality, noting that the disease is only mentioned twice. Wilson's illustrations received praise, with a reviewer for Quill & Quire writing that the bright colours and her "familiar style of high realism" helped to offset the book's dark subject material.

In 1999, the parent of a student in Bear Creek Elementary School in Euless, Texas, complained that her daughter's school library should not have Tiger Flowers in its collection, protesting the book's subject matter. The parent was counseled by the conservative American Center for Law & Justice and sought to have the book kept in the school counselor's office instead of the library. A district committee voted in support of the library's decision to keep the book, stating that it would be a beneficial resource for children about topics they may not otherwise feel comfortable discussing with adults. The district's school board trustees later found the book to be "educationally suitable" and upheld the committee's decision in a 3–1 vote. One trustee described Tiger Flowers as "one of the most innocuous books I have ever read".
