= Rory Power =

Speculative fiction author

- Education: Middlebury College (BA); University of East Anglia (MA)
- Writing career
- Genre: Speculative fiction
- Notable work: Wilder Girls (2019)

Rory Power is an American author of speculative fiction and horror novels for adult and young adult audience. Her debut novel, Wilder Girls (2019) was a New York Times Best Seller. She is also the author of the young adult novels Burn Our Bodies Down (2020) and Kill Creatures (2025), as well as the adult fantasy duology, The Wind-Up Garden, consisting of In a Garden Burning Gold (2022) and In an Orchard Grown from Ash (2024).

After growing up in Boston, Power received a bachelor's degree from Middlebury College, then a Master of Arts in prose fiction from the University of East Anglia. As of 2025, she lives in Providence, Rhode Island.

== Books ==
=== Wilder Girls (2019) ===
Power's debut, Wilder Girls, is a young adult horror novel published by Delacorte Books on July 9, 2019. According to reviewers, it explores themes related to feminism, friendship, survival, and environmentalism. Kirkus Reviews specifically referred to it as "part survival thriller, part post-apocalyptic romance, and part ecocritical feminist manifesto".

The novel centers on Hetty, Byatt and Reese, three teenage girls attending the Raxter School for Girls. At the time of the novel, a mysterious illness called the Tox has overtaken the island upon which the school rests, manifesting in unusual features among the flora, fauna, and girls. Due to the Tox, all post-pubescent girls have experienced difficult flare-ups that result in odd features, such as a second spine, glowing hair, or scaled skin. The school has been quarantined, receiving regular supplies from the United States Navy, though the supplies are barely enough to keep the girls alive. The novel focuses on the school's survival, the rules they must follow, and what happens when changes occur with supplies.

Wilder Girls was a New York Times Best Seller, and was well received by critics overall, including starred reviews from Booklist, Kirkus Reviews, Publishers Weekly, and Shelf Awareness. The Chicago Public Library and Kirkus Reviews included Wilder Girls on their list of the best books of 2019. The following year, Booklist included it on their top ten lists for "Mysteries for Youth" and "YA Mysteries for Adult Readers".

=== Burn Our Bodies Down (2020) ===
Burn Our Bodies Down is a young adult mystery and thriller, speculative fiction novel published by Delacorte Books on July 7, 2020. The story explores themes related to relationships and generational abuse.

The novel centers Margot and her family, including her mother, Jo, with whom she shares an unusual resemblance. The mother and daughter have a strained relationship, with Jo holding back many secrets, including about their past. When Margot stumbles upon a connection to their past, she calls her grandmother and travels to Phalene, where her mother grew up. As she arrives, however, she learns of a fire that burned down the family farm and finds a dead girl who looks exactly like her.

Burn Our Bodies Down was mostly well received by critics, including starred reviews from Booklist, Publishers Weekly, and Shelf Awareness. Shelf Awareness's Lynn Becker found that the novel contained "strong, suspenseful writing and pitch-perfect touches of horror", with Booklist's Maggie Reagan and School Library Journal's Talea Anderson recommending the novel for those who enjoy character-driven stories. Kirkus Reviews provided a less positive review, stating that it "falters under the weight of an unwieldy plot".

The Young Adult Library Services Association included Burn Our Bodies Down on their 2021 list of the Best Fiction for Young Adults.

=== The Wind-Up Garden duology ===
The Wind-Up Garden is an epic fantasy duology published by Del Rey Books. It Power's first novel series, as well as her first novels published for adult readers.

==== In a Garden Burning Gold (2022) ====
In a Garden Burning Gold was published in May 2023. The novel centers magical twins Rhea and Alexandros (Lexos) Argyros, who help run their family's kingdom of Thyzakos, including natural phenomena. Over the past century, their father has become tyrannical, and the twins have bonded together. Although the twins and their siblings fear their father, they are also fiercely loyal to him. Amidst the grueling day-to-day, they learn of unrest within the kingdom, forcing the twins to separate. Throughout their respective journeys, they begin to question their loyalties.

Writing for Paste, Lacy Baugher Milas discussed how "Power weaves the specter of intergenerational trauma into her rich fantasy landscape and an almost Shakespearean feel to the tragedy that unfolds". Amid an overall positive review, Baugher Milas noted that Power "spends an awful lot more time telling us about how toxic the heart of this family is rather than showing us". Publishers Weekly also compared the novel to a "Shakespearean tragedy", while describing "the characters as frustratingly passive"; however, they praised the novel's "distinctive magic system" and "complex geopolitical intrigue", which result in "a fascinating, lived-in world".

==== In an Orchard Grown from Ash (2024) ====
In an Orchard Grown from Ash was published in May 2023. The novel follows the events in the previous book, with twins Rhea and Lexos combatting their father's abusive control. Now, distrust grows among the remaining family members. Lexos and Rhea are separated, with Lexos losing magical powers to the Domina while Rhea's power grows. With the upset, the kingdom is stuck in an extended winter, and Rhea sends her younger sister, Chrysanthi, off to find their brother, Nitsos, who is responsible for the death of Rhea's husband. Meanwhile, Nitsos searches for the graves of the saints, where great power supposedly exists. All four siblings find themselves at the graves.

In an Orchard Grown from Ash was well received by critics, including starred reviews from Booklist and Library Journal. Reviewers discussed the potential redemption arks for "flawed characters" within a "raw, emotional journey". According to Publishers Weekly, the novel "probes even deeper into her series’ exploration of power and corruption, but adds a hopeful note".

=== Kill Creatures (2025) ===
Kill Creatures is a young adult mystery and thriller novel published by Delacorte Books on June 3, 2025.

Told in two timelines, the novel takes place in Utah one year after three local teenage girls have gone missing, and 17-year-old Nan is certain she killed them. At a commemorative vigil, one of the girls mysteriously appears, without remembering what has happened. As police try to figure out what has happened, Nan questions her memory and what she knows about her life.

Kill Creatures was generally well received by critics, including starred reviews from Booklist and School Library Journal. Reviewers described the novel as "unique", "unputdownable", "gripping", and "smartly plotted".School Library Journal's Amanda Mastrull highlighted how "Power masterfully seeds Nan’s narrative with subtle clues to [the main character's] unreliability". Kirkus Reviews described Power's writing as "dark, flowing prose", while Publishers Weekly stated that "frantic pacing catapults readers past occasional plotting pitfalls while fostering anxiety and unease".

== Awards and honors ==
In 2019, the Chicago Public Library and Kirkus Reviews included Wilder Girls in their list of the best books of the year. The Chicago Public Library also named the novel in its list of the year's best book covers. The following year, Booklist included it on their top ten lists for "Mysteries for Youth" and "YA Mysteries for Adult Readers", and the Young Adult Library Services Association (YALSA) included it on their Teens' Top Ten list.

In 2021, YALSA included Burn Our Bodies Down on their 2021 list of the Best Fiction for Young Adults.

Awards for Power's writing
Title	Year	Award	Result	Ref.
Wilder Girls	2019	Goodreads Choice Award for Young Adult Fantasy & Science Fiction	Nominee	
Wilder Girls	2019	Ladies of Horror Fiction Award for Best Young Adult	Winner	
Wilder Girls	2019	New England Book Award for Young Adult	Finalist	
Wilder Girls	2020	Lambda Literary Award for Children's and Young Adult Literature	Finalist	
Wilder Girls	2020	Pennsylvania Keystone State Reading Association Book Award	Nominee	
Burn Our Bodies Down	2020	New England Book Award for Young Adult	Finalist	

== Publications ==
=== The Wind-Up Garden duology ===
- In a Garden Burning Gold. Del Rey Books. 2022. ISBN 978-0-593-35497-1.
- In an Orchard Grown from Ash. Del Rey Books. 2024. ISBN 978-0-593-35500-8.

=== Standalone novels ===
- Wilder Girls. Delacorte Books. 2019. ISBN 978-0-525-64558-0.
- Burn Our Bodies Down. Delacorte Books. 2020. ISBN 978-0-525-64562-7.
- Kill Creatures. Delacorte Books. 2025. ISBN 978-0-593-30231-6.
