= Losing Uncle Tim =

1989 book by MaryKate Jordan

- Author: MaryKate Jordan
- Illustrator: Judith Friedman
- Language: English
- Genre: Children's book
- Publisher: Albert Whitman & Co.
- Publication date: 1989
- Publication place: United States
- Awards: Lambda Literary Award
- ISBN: 978-0-8075-4758-8

Losing Uncle Tim is a children's book written by MaryKate Jordan with illustrations by Judith Friedman. The book was published in 1989 by Albert Whitman & Co., and tells the story of a boy dealing with the death of his uncle due to AIDS. The book was criticized by parents at the time due to its overly realistic take on adult themes in a children's book.

== Plot ==
Tim is Daniel's uncle and favorite person to spend time with and play games. As time goes on, though, Tim starts going out of his home less and less, eventually stopping completely. Daniel learns that his uncle has AIDS, and that's the reason he feels sick all the time. Daniel and his parents take care of uncle Tim, but he eventually dies from his condition.

== Reception ==
Losing Uncle Tim was classified by librarians at the time as a bibliotherapy book, and, although children's books have had adult themes present in them for the past couple decades, it was seen as a shift to a more realistic approach to those themes. Books like Losing Uncle Tim received pushback from parents, who were worried the realism in those stories could be traumatizing to kids.

The book received the Lambda Literary Award for Children's/Young Adult Fiction in 1990.
