= Sharon Dennis Wyeth =

American author of children's books

- Education: Harvard University (BA); Hunter College (MFA)
- Occupations: Children's Author; Creative Writing Professor
- Writing career
- Genres: Children's Fiction and Non-fiction, Poetry
- Notable works: Evette: The River and Me; Orphea Proud; Something Beautiful; Always My Dad
- Website: sharondenniswyeth.com

Sharon Dennis Wyeth is an American poet and author of numerous children's books. She is best known for Evette: The River and Me, which tells the story of a young girl, Evette, who is inspired to clean up the polluted tributary her grandmother once swam in. Wyeth's fiction was the basis for the first biracial American Girl doll, part of its World By Us collection. Evette: The River and Me was derived from Wyeth's childhood in Washington, D.C., where she grew up swimming in the Anacostia River, in part, because Black Washingtonians were harassed when they attempted to access desegregated community pools.

== Early life ==
Wyeth was raised in Washington, D.C. and graduated from Anacostia High School in 1966. She then attended Harvard University, earning her B.A. in a combined discipline of sociology, psychology and anthropology. Later, Wyeth worked as a family counselor in New York City. It was there that she started a theater company and began writing romance novels before focusing on books for young readers.

== Career ==
Wyeth's children's book, Boys Wanted, the first in her Pen Pal's series, was published in 1989. During the 1990s, she wrote several books to include Once on This River, The World of Daughter McGuire, Always My Dad, and The Winning Stroke.

In 2004, Wyeth published Orphea Proud, which is narrated by seventeen-year-old Orphea. It's set on a New York City stage, where Orphea performs a monologue that describes the early loss of her parents, how she fell in love with her best friend, Lissa, and the fallout related to Lissa's tragic car accident and Orphea's homophobic brother.

Orphea Proud is one of the many books written by authors who are LGBTQ, women, or people of color to be challenged by local school districts as being inappropriate and considered for banning.

In 2022, Wyeth published Juneteenth: Our Day of Freedom, non-fiction for children about Emancipation Day, 1865. Wyeth's other children's books include: Something Beautiful, A Piece of Heaven, and The Granddaughter Necklace.

Wyeth is a visiting associate professor at Hollins University in Roanoke, Virginia.

== Recognition ==
Wyeth is a member of the Cave Canem fellowship of African American poets. Her picture book, Something Beautiful, was named a Children's Book Council Notable Book and a Parents Magazine Best Book of the Year.

In 2005, Wyeth was a Lambda Literary Award for Children's and Young Adult Literature finalist for her book, Orphea Proud.

Her book, Evette: The River and Me, won a 2021 Good Housekeeping Best Toy Award along with the accompanying American Girl doll, Evette Peeters.
