= Blair Fell =

- Education: B.A., University of Hawaiʻi at Mānoa; M.F.A., City College of New York (City University of New York)
- Occupations: Writer; actor; sign language interpreter
- Writing career
- Period: 1990s–present
- Genres: Queer fiction; Literary fiction; Historical fiction; Fantasy; Theater; Television
- Website: blairfell.com

Blair Fell is an American writer, actor, and American Sign Language interpreter based in New York City. He is the author of three novels: The Sign for Home (2022), Disco Witches of Fire Island (2025), and The Two Wills (2026). His fiction is known for its queer themes, humor, and emotionally resonant storytelling. Fell has also written for television and theater, performed as an actor on stage and screen, and has worked as an ASL interpreter since 1993.

== Early life and education ==
Blair Fell lives and works in New York City. He earned his undergraduate degree from the University of Hawaiʻi at Mānoa and also attended Gallaudet College as a special student. In 2020, he earned a Master of Fine Arts in creative writing from City College of New York, part of the City University of New York system, where he was a two-time recipient of the Doris Lippman Prize in Creative Writing—once for an early draft of his debut novel, and again for Disco Witches of Fire Island.

== Career ==
Fell began his creative career as a playwright and actor in New York City, where he wrote plays performed in downtown NYC venues and in productions across the United States and internationally. His plays include Naked Will in 1999, based on Oscar Wilde's short story The Portrait of Mr. W. H., exploring the queer love story embedded in Shakespeare's sonnets. The play was nominated for a GLAAD Media Award. Burning Habits was a 1998 cult theatrical work that received coverage in The New York Times, which wrote that audiences with "a childlike glee in seeing authority figures ridiculed" and "a thorough distaste for sexual hypocrisy" would "get a major kick out of Burning Habits." The Tragic and Horrible Life of the Singing Nun was reviewed in The New York Times in 1998, which found within it "the troubled, oddly compassionate soul that was always at the core of the work of such first-rate camp artists as Charles Ludlam," and wrote that "in dressing up despair in barbed frivolity, Mr. Fell provides his own skewed equivalent of tragic catharsis." Madame Fury was reviewed in The New York Times Critic's Notebook column in 1998 as "wildly amusing," with the paper singling out Fell's dialogue for a tyrannical ballet master character based on George Balanchine.

Beauty was a one-act play included in the anthology production Happy Endings in 2008. The New York Times called it one of the best pieces in the program, describing it as "Blair Fell's ode to longing with a Proustian punch line." Fell's theater work earned him seven Dramalogue Awards, the HX Camp Comedy Award, and the Robbie Award.

=== Television and film ===
Fell's film and television credits include Queer as Folk, where he contributed teleplay and story to the American version of the LGBTQ-themed drama series (2002). He won the Shine Award for his work on the show.

Fell wrote for the public television series California Connected and received a Golden Mic Award for his segment.

Fell appeared as an actor in CBS Summer Playhouse on CBS in 1989. In 2017, Fell served in the camera and electrical department on Surviving Home.

== Writing ==
Fell has written personal essays and journalism that have appeared in Out magazine, the New York Daily News, HuffPost, and Fiction Southeast.

Fell's debut novel, The Sign for Home, was published in April 2022 by Atria/Emily Bestler Books (Simon & Schuster). The novel follows Arlo Dilly, a 23-year-old DeafBlind Jehovah's Witness living in Poughkeepsie, New York, whose sheltered life is upended when a new ASL interpreter opens him up to a wider world and the possibility of finding a lost love. The novel drew on Fell's experience as an ASL interpreter working with Deaf and DeafBlind individuals. The New York Times featured the novel in a "By the Book" interview with novelist James Hannaham, who praised it as "a hilarious, peculiar and very touching story about a deaf, blind Jehovah's Witness boy and his gay interpreter." The book was selected as both an American Booksellers Association "Indies Introduce" selection and an "Indie Next" pick for Spring 2022, and was longlisted for the Center for Fiction First Novel Prize.

Fell's second novel, Disco Witches of Fire Island, was published in 2025 by Alcove Press and distributed by Penguin Random House. Set in 1989 on Fire Island Pines, the novel follows a young gay man grieving the death of his boyfriend from AIDS who becomes entwined with a coven of queer disco witches during a summer of magic, romance, and community. The New York Times called it "heartfelt," writing that it "perfectly makes a case for the necessity of hope, no matter how bleak the world may feel." The novel was named a finalist for the Lambda Literary Award in Gay Romance at the 38th Lambda Literary Awards ceremony (2026).

Fell's third novel, The Two Wills, is a queer historical fiction reimagining of William Shakespeare's life and the possible inspiration behind his sonnets. The novel was published in 2026 by Alcove Press and distributed by Penguin Random House.

== Personal life ==
Fell was previously married to Colin Lentz; the two have since divorced.

== Awards and recognition ==
Award	Work	Year
Doris Lippman Prize in Creative Writing (×2)	The Sign for Home (draft); Disco Witches of Fire Island	Multiple
Shine Award	Queer as Folk (TV)	—
Golden Mic Award	California Connected (TV)	—
HX Camp Comedy Award	Theater	—
Seven Dramalogue Awards	Theater	—
The Robbie Award	Theater	—
GLAAD Media Award nomination	Naked Will (play)	—
Lambda Literary Award finalist (Gay Romance)	Disco Witches of Fire Island	2026
Center for Fiction First Novel Prize longlist	The Sign for Home	2022
Indies Introduce Selection (ABA)	The Sign for Home	2022
Indie Next Pick (ABA)	The Sign for Home	Spring 2022

== Selected publications ==
=== Novels ===
- The Sign for Home (Atria/Emily Bestler Books, 2022) ISBN 978-1982175955
- Disco Witches of Fire Island (Alcove Press, 2025)
- The Two Wills (Alcove Press, 2026)

=== Plays ===
- Naked Will
- The Tragic and Horrible Life of the Singing Nun
- Burning Habits
- Madame Fury
- Beauty

=== Television ===
- Queer as Folk (Showtime, 2000–2005) – writer (teleplay and story, 2002)
- California Connected (Public television) – writer
