= Wilder Girls =

2019 novel by Rory Power

- Author: Rory Power
- Language: English
- Genre: Young adult; Horror; Science fiction; Mystery
- Publisher: Delacorte Press
- Publication date: July 9, 2019
- Media type: Print
- ISBN: 9780525645603

Wilder Girls is a young adult horror novel by Rory Power, published July 9, 2019 by Delacorte Press. The book is a New York Times best seller.

== Plot ==
Wilder Girls centers on Hetty, Byatt and Reese, three teenage girls attending the Raxter School for Girls. At the time of the novel, a mysterious illness called the Tox has overtaken the island upon which the school rests, manifesting in unusual features among the flora, fauna, and girls. Due to the Tox, all post-pubescent girls have experienced difficult flare-ups that result in odd features, such as a second spine, glowing hair, or scaled skin. The school has been quarantined, receiving regular supplies from the United States Navy, though the supplies are barely enough to keep the girls alive. The novel focuses on the school's survival, the rules they must follow, and what happens when changes occur with supplies.

== Themes ==
Wilder Girls explores themes related to feminism, friendship, survival, and environmentalism.

== Reception ==
=== Reviews ===
Wilder Girls is a New York Times best seller and was well received by critics, including starred reviews from Booklist, Kirkus Reviews, Publishers Weekly, and Shelf Awareness, as well as positive reviews from NPR and School Library Journal.

NPR's Caitlyn Paxson compared Wilder Girls to a combination of Jeff VanderMeer's "creeping biological corruption" and Nova Ren Suma's "angry, intense teen girl relationships".

Multiple reviewers discussed how the novel forgoes common tropes. Shelf Awareness's Lana Barnes applauded the novel for how it portrayed the girls at the school, focusing on "female bonds" without "pit[ting] the girls against each other" or describing them" as weak females waiting to be rescued". Paxson pointed out how the novel betrays the moralistic trope where "suffering makes our characters better people"; rather, through the suffering, the characters becoming "more intensely themselves".

While discussing the writing, Publishers Weekly highlighted the novel's "electric prose" and "visceral horror", while Kirkus Reviews praised the "expertly crafted, slow-burn reveal of the deadly consequences of climate change". However, Publishers Weekly noted that "abrupt perspective shifts sometimes disrupt the action, and the finer details of the Tox are left a bit vague". Booklist's Mahjabeen Syed similarly noted that the "tangled backstory and foreshadowing device are left tantalizingly dangling".

=== Awards and honors ===
The Chicago Public Library and Kirkus Reviews included Wilder Girls in their list of the best books of 2019. The Chicago Public Library also named the novel in its list of the year's best book covers. The following year, Booklist included it on their top ten lists for "Mysteries for Youth" and "YA Mysteries for Adult Readers".

Awards for Wilder Girls
| Year | Award | Result | Ref. |
|---|---|---|---|
| 2019 | Goodreads Choice Award for Young Adult Fantasy & Science Fiction | Nominee | |
| 2019 | Ladies of Horror Fiction Award for Best Young Adult | Winner | |
| 2019 | New England Book Award for Young Adult | Finalist | |
| 2020 | Lambda Literary Award for Children's and Young Adult Literature | Finalist | |
| 2020 | YALSA's Teens' Top Ten | Top Ten | |
| 2020 | Pennsylvania Keystone State Reading Association Book Award | Nominee | |
