= From Archie to Zack =

2020 children's picture book by Vincent Kirsch

- Author: Vincent X. Kirsch
- Illustrator: Vincent X. Kirsch
- Language: English
- Genre: Picture book
- Publisher: Abrams Books
- Publication date: December 29, 2020
- Publication place: United States
- Pages: 40
- ISBN: 978-1-4197-4367-2
- OCLC: 1203045084

From Archie to Zack is a children's picture book written and illustrated by Vincent X. Kirsch. It tells the story of two boys who have a crush on each other but don't have the courage to admit it. The book was published on December 29, 2020, by Abrams Books and received positive reviews, but some of its aspects were criticized. From Archie to Zack was a finalist on the 2021 Lambda Literary Award, in the Children's and Young Adult category.

== Background ==
Vincent X. Kirsch, who was raised in New York, studied advertising and filmmaking at Syracuse University. After school, he struggled to find opportunities as a picture-book artist until twenty-four years later, an editor, impressed with his art, offered him the opportunity. He has created illustrations for books written by other authors, in addition to having published several of his own.

== Summary ==
From Archie to Zack tells the story of two little boys, Archie and Zack, who are scared to express their feelings towards each other. While everyone around them clearly sees that they love each other, the two boys struggle to convey their emotions. To confront his feelings, Archie writes notes for Zack, which he hides. Their classmates find these notes and give them to Zack, who is scared to return a note to Archie.

== Reception ==
Writing for the School Library Journal, Rachel Mulligan gave From Archie to Zack a starred review and called it "one of the most heartfelt books of the season". Mulligan praised the story as an example to parents on how to deal with queer relationships between children. They also praised the illustrations by Kirsch, calling them "delightful". A review published by the Booklist called the book a "heartwarming, sweet-spirited story of friendship and more".

Publishers Weekly commented on the book's illustration, noting its "uncanny bent, with goggle-eyed, noodle-limbed children", and criticizing the author's choice to draw the eyes of "presumably East Asian characters" as lines and the "seemingly South Asian child with a bindi are puzzlingly diamond-shaped." The reviewer ended on a positive note, saying the "queer interracial love story will appeal."

Kirkus Reviews criticized the overall story presented in the book, noting there is no apparent conflict and no reason given for the boys to not admit their love for one another, saying "it’s unclear where the tension is coming from". They also note the actions carried out by the boys' friends can be seen as a sort of forced outing. Although the reviewer finds the illustrations to be "goofy and energetic", they criticize the same aspects as the Publishers Weekly's review: "two children, likely intended as East Asian, are depicted with stereotypically slanted eyes."

From Archie to Zack was a finalist in the 2021 Lambda Literary Award for Children's and Young Adult Literature.
