= Joan Alden =

American writer (1944–2024)

- Born: Joan Margaret Lindow; June 1, 1944; Detroit, Michigan, U.S.
- Died: February 17, 2024 (aged 79)
- Other name: Joan Lindau
- Occupation: Writer

Joan Alden (June 1, 1944 – February 17, 2024), born Joan Margaret Lindow, was an American writer. Books by Alden were twice finalists for the Lambda Literary Awards, in 1990 (as Joan Lindau) and 1993.

== Early life and education ==
Alden was born in Detroit, Michigan, and raised in Ohio, the daughter of Elwood Raymond Lindow and Margaret Garred Lindow. Her father was an executive at Ford Motor Company. She attended Rocky River High School in Ohio, and trained to be a dental hygienist. She earned degrees in education (bachelor's and master's) at Ohio State University. She also studied at the Stella Adler Studio of Acting in New York City.

== Career ==
Alden worked as a dental hygienist as a young woman, in Ohio and California. She participated in the first New York City Pride March in 1970, with her partner. She published her first novel, Mrs. Cooper's Boarding House, in 1980; one reviewer described the novel as "nostalgic, compassionate, and endearing." She taught writing at Dutchess Community College from 1999 to 2002, and at the Citadel Military College in South Carolina from 2003 to 2008. She attended the 2017 Women's March in Washington, D.C.

Alden wrote several novels, two memoirs, one children's book, and a play, After the Dance. Her second novel, Letting in the Night (1989), was nominated for a Lambda Literary Award in the small press category. In 1993 she received a second Lambda nomination, in the category of children's literature, for A Boy's Best Friend (1992). Her final book, a memoir of grief called Her Widow (2018), won honorable mention for creative non-fiction in the North Street Book Prize competition that year. Kirkus Reviews recommended Her Widow as "tender, realistic snapshots of life during bereavement."

== Publications ==
=== Novels ===
- Mrs. Cooper's Boarding House (1980)
- Letting in the Night (1989)
- Before Our Eyes (1993)

=== Children's books ===
- A Boy's Best Friend (1992, children's book, illustrated by Catherine J. Hopkins)

=== Memoir ===
- When I First Knew (2016, fiction and memoir)
- Her Widow (2019)

== Personal life ==
Alden was in a ten-year partnership with Allyson L. Layne, from the late 1960s into the 1970s. From 1979 to 1996, she was with photographer Catherine J. Hopkins; they married in a home ceremony with a Presbyterian officiant in 1991, and lived together in the Catskills from 1985 until Hopkins died from ovarian cancer in 1996. Alden lived in Charleston, South Carolina, from 2003 to 2013, and then moved to Florida. Alden was diagnosed with multiple sclerosis in her thirties. She died in 2024, at the age of 79.
