= Iveliz Explains It All =

2022 children's verse novel by Andrea Beatriz Arango

- Author: Andrea Beatriz Arango
- Illustrator: Alyssa Bermudez
- Language: English; Spanish
- Genre: Children's fiction
- Published: September 22, 2022
- Publisher: Random House (English); Vintage Español (Spanish)
- Publication place: United States
- Pages: 272
- ISBN: 978-0-593-56397-7

Iveliz Explains It All (Spanish: Iveliz lo explica todo) is a 2022 novel-in-verse written by Andrea Beatriz Arango and illustrated by Alyssa Bermudez. The novel follows 12-year-old Iveliz, a Latina girl, as she navigates starting junior high and mental-health issues. Published to highly positive reviews, it was the recipient of a Newbery Honor in 2023.

== Synopsis ==
12-year-old Iveliz has anxiety about middle school. She is known as a troublemaker who frequently gets into fights and has been suspended before. She feels unable to describe her mental health situation and has trouble speaking up for herself. Her grandmother, an Alzheimer's patient who moves in with Iveliz and her mother after Hurricane Maria ravages her home in Puerto Rico, only worsens the situation by criticizing Iveliz's depression medication.

The novel is told in diary format and follows Iveliz throughout her 7th grade year; a mental-health resource supplement is provided after the story.

== Release and reception ==
Iveliz was published on September 22, 2022 by Random House; its Spanish edition, Iveliz lo explica todo, was released the following February. The book won a Newbery Honor in 2023, part of the second such roster in which only authors of color won.

Reviews for Iveliz were highly positive. Booklist's Kristina Pino wrote, "Even though the story is mostly about Ive's spiraling, it beautifully illustrates the power of compassion and truth telling, how meaningful friendships are supposed to look, and the ways that loved ones might try to help." The Horn Book commented that Iveliz "deals convincingly with grief, mental health, and middle-school bullies" amid the title character's "relatable and strong" voice, while Kirkus Reviews found it "superbly woven" in a pre-release starred review. Reviewing the Spanish edition, Selenia Paz of the School Library Journal said, "This heartfelt book... is a necessary and important choice for middle grade Spanish collections."

== See also ==
- Latino children's literature
