= Alyssa Bermudez =

Illustrator, teacher, and author

Alyssa Bermudez is an American-born illustrator, teacher, and author who currently resides in Tasmania, Australia. She uses watercolor, acrylic paints, and photoshop to create her art. Bermudez was born in New York City to Puerto Rican parents. She attended the Fashion Institute of Technology, where she received her bachelor's and master's in illustration and animation.

== Notable works ==
=== The Mindful Fairies (2017) ===
The Mindful Fairies (2017) written by Jenny Fitzgibbon and illustrated by Alyssa Bermudez. The book is about a child that has a bond with fairies who live under her grandparents’ garden. The child's perspective of this new realm is greatly detailed in the book.

=== Lucia the Luchadora and the Million Masks (2017) ===
Lucia the Luchadora and the Million Masks (2017) was written by Cynthia Leonor Garza and illustrated by Alyssa Bermudez. The protagonist Lucia wears a cape around the playground but encounters gendered stereotypes implying that girls aren't superheroes. Lucia learns that she has an ancestral lineage of luchadoras in her family which provides her strength about her identity and countering criticism.

=== My Singing Nana (2019) ===
My Singing Nana (2019) is a picture book written by Pat Mora and illustrated by Alyssa Bermudez. The book centers on a family member with Alzheimer's disease demonstrates the importance of family relationships.

=== Amelia Chamelia and the Birthday Party (2019) ===
Amelia Chamelia and the Birthday Party (2019) is the first book of a series written by Laura Sieveking and illustrated by Alyssa Bermudez. The book is about the protagonist, Amelia, who turns eight years old and discovers she has magical powers. The question lingers if she will be able to control her powers at a party.

=== Amelia Chamelia and the Gelato Surprise (2019) ===
Amelia Chamelia and the Gelato Surprise (2019) is the second book of a series written by Laura Sieveking and illustrated by Alyssa Bermudez. Amelia has chameleon powers, when she gets angry she turns red. In Amelia's class they are learning Italian and will host a gelato event in school. However, someone is vandalizing the school with graffiti and the class's gelato event is at risk of cancellation. Determined, Amelia makes an effort to catch the bandit.

=== Amelia Chamelia and the School Play (2019) ===
Amelia Chamelia and the School Play (2019) is the third book of a series written by Laura Sieveking and illustrated by Alyssa Bermudez. Amelia's class will be hosting a Snow White play to the school. However, Amelia does not like attention and is nervous that her chameleon powers will be exposed.

=== Amelia Chamelia and the Farm Adventure (2019) ===
Amelia Chamelia and the Farm Adventure (2019) is the fourth book of a series written by Laura Sieveking and illustrated by Alyssa Bermudez. Amelia and her family go to a farm for the holidays and she reveals her chameleon powers to Willow but it doesn't go as planned. The book follows Amelia in an attempt to convince Willow about her powers.

=== Goodnight ‘70s (2019) ===
Goodnight ‘70s (2019) written by Peter Stein and illustrated by Alyssa Bermudez. The book centers on reviving the 70s aesthetic to provide nostalgia.

=== Becoming Beatriz (2019) ===
Becoming Beatriz (2019) was written by Tami Charles and illustrated by Alyssa Bermudez. After Beatriz's quinceañera goes wrong she loses hope gaining dance fame. She sets aside her dreams to take care of her grieving mother and leads her brother's gang after his death. Beatriz's spark comes back when the new kid invites her to a dance competition. The book focuses on Beatriz navigating her identity as an Afro Latina.

=== Big Apple Diaries (2021) ===
Big Apple Diaries (2021) was illustrated and written by Alyssa Bermudez. The comic style novel is based on her diaries when at age twelve, she experienced September 11 or 911 as a New York resident. As a child, Bermudez could not bring herself to write about 911 in her entries. Bermudez kept this silence within Big Apple Diaries to represent the confusion and utter shock a child experiences. Bermudez was in 8th grade. That day, her mother was working at a law firm new the twin towers, and her father was working in New Jersey. Bermudez remembers the smell of ashes after the towers collapsed and the shift of perspective on everyday issues. The book was written with the intention to represent the growth and change one experiences as a child after the September 11, 2001, attacks, such as putting a bigger effort in overcoming everyday issues.

=== We Laugh Alike / Juntos Nos Reímos (2021) ===
We Laugh Alike / Juntos Nos Reímos (2021) was written by Carmen T. Bernier-Grand and illustrated by Alyssa Bermudez. It is a book about two monolingual friend groups who speak English and Spanish encounter each other at a park. The book depicts how friendships can arise despite language barriers.

=== Iveliz Explains It All (2022) ===
Iveliz Explains It All (2022) is a novel written by Andrea Beatriz Arango and illustrated by Alyssa Bermudez. The book is about a 12-year-old Latina girl named Iveliz dealing with anxiety. Iveliz is known for getting into fights that have led to suspensions before. The book takes place when Hurricane Maria devastates Puerto Rico. Ivelia's grandmother, who has Alzheimer's, moves in again. With the overwhelming atmosphere, Ivelia's mental health worsens.

== Awards ==
- The Comic Awards of Australia: 2022
