= The Grief Keeper =

2019 novel by Alexandra Villasante

- First edition
- Author: Alexandra Villasante
- Language: English
- Genre: Young adult novel, science fiction
- Publisher: Putnam
- Publication date: 2019
- Awards: Lambda Literary Award
- ISBN: 978-0-525-51402-2

The Grief Keeper is a science fiction novel for young adults written by Alexandra Villasante. The book was published in 2019 by Putnam and received the Lambda Literary Award in the following year.

The book tells the story of two sisters from El Salvador, Marisol and Gabi, who flee from an immigrant detention center on the American border, with the older sister, Marisol, being forced to participate in an experimental procedure or risk being deported.

== Analysis ==
The English Journal wrote that this book was used in an AP class to familiarize high school students on gender identity, sexuality, and race.

== Reception ==
Villasante's debut novel received mixed reviews. Yvette Garcia, for The Booklist, praised the author's depiction of first love between the characters Marisol and Rey, but said "the final chapters feel disappointingly rushed". A review published in the School Library Journal called it a "hauntingly beautiful story" and also praised how the topics of lesbianism and immigration policies were "tastefully handled and woven into the story."

Kirkus Reviews highlighted the author's focus on social issues such as "anti-LGBTQ environment" and "internalized racism in immigrants", and how those are captured by Villasante's writing, but ended on a somewhat negative note, saying that "shifting the focus from loss and the complexities of immigration to the romantic relationship risks implying that relationships can remove grief."

Writing for The Catholic Library World, Annette Fisher criticized the book for its portrayal of the main character, Marisol, calling it "uneven and confusing" due to conflicting personalities. Fisher also noted the various themes that play a part in the book, from sisterly love to wealth disparity, and said none of them are "fully explained or developed", and that "they remain vague and unsatisfying much like the book's ending."

The Grief Keeper won the Lambda Literary Award in 2020, in the Young Adult category.
