= Logan-Ashley Kisner =

American author

- Education: University of Nevada, Las Vegas (BA)
- Occupation: Author
- Writing career
- Genres: Horror; Speculative fiction; Young adult
- Website: loganashleykisner.com

Logan-Ashley Kisner is an American author of young adult horror novels. His works include Old Wounds (2024) and The Transition (2025). Kisner received a Bachelor of Arts in creative writing from the University of Nevada, Las Vegas. As of 2026, he lives in Las Vegas with his partner, Alex. Kisner describes himself as "trans+queer".

== Old Wounds (2024) ==
Old Wounds was published by Delacorte Books in September 2024. The book follows two transgender teenagers, Erin and Max, as they attempt to travel from Columbus, Ohio to Berkeley, California, leaving behind difficult family situations. After a car troubles leave them stranded in Lebanon Junction, Kentucky, the teens find themselves in a difficult situation as the locals need a female sacrifice for Bullitt Beast, a monster living in the woods. The story is told from Erin's and Max's alternating perspectives.

Kirkus Reviews referred to Old Wounds as "an ode to the strength of trans kids, in the face of all kinds of terror". Publishers Weekly commended Kisner for writing "two complex, believably flawed protagonists without demonizing nor glossing over their mistakes as they navigate their trauma". While discussing this aspect, Meredith Stafford, writing for Southern Review of Books, found that "the novel succeeds [...] in showing us why each of the two behaves the way that they do and that the answer lies in their disparate experiences of trans adolescence". Kirkus added that while the novel is "violent and spine-tinglingly creepy on the surface, Kisner's debut is also a hopeful story of connection and community, and a fiery ode to the trans youth who must fight for survival in a society set against them".

Old Wounds is a Junior Library Guild book. In 2024, The Bulletin of the Center for Children's Books named it one of the year's best children's books. The following year, it was a finalist for the Lambda Literary Award for Young Adult Literature, and the Young Adult Library Services Association included it on their list of Best Fiction for Young Adults.

== The Transition (2025) ==
The Transition was published by Delacorte Books in September 2025. The book follows Hunter, a 17-year-old transgender teenager, who is recovering from top surgery when he is attacked by a wild animal in his backyard in a Chicago suburb. His wounds heal quickly, and his period returns, despite having disappeared when he started testosterone. Unable to reach his father, Hunter turns to his best friends, Gabe and Mars, who suspect Hunter has been attacked by a werewolf. While Gabe and Mars try to hunt down the creature, Hunter begins to hear it speaking to him, inviting him to join its pack.

The Transition received a starred review from Publishers Weekly, who described the novel as "a thrilling, provocative parable about body dysmorphia and transformation both earthly and mythical". In a less positive review, Kirkus referred to The Transition as "a grim and brooding story weakened by inconsistent worldbuilding". They specifically noted that "the conflict and resolution lose emotional impact due to the haphazard construction of the lore around the rules for werewolves, which undermines the characters' choices".

Locus included The Transition on their 2025 list of recommended reading for young adults. The novel is a finalist for the 2026 Lambda Literary Award for Young Adult Literature and the Ignyte Award for Outstanding Novel – Young Adult.

== Publications ==
- Kisner, Logan-Ashley (2024). Old Wounds. Delacorte Books. ISBN 978-0-5938-1474-1.
- Kisner, Logan-Ashley (2025). The Transition. Delacorte Books. ISBN 978-0-593-81478-9.
