= Sarah Dooley =

American singer

Sarah Dooley is an American comedian, singer, songwriter, and performer located in New York City.

She is a 2011 graduate of Barnard College, where she received attention across the Columbia University campus both for her musical performances as well as her comedy Web series called "And Sarah". It was this web series that brought broader attention to her work when Ian Ayres wrote about it on his blog Freakonomics.

Her album Stupid Things was released in February 2014. She places artists like Fiona Apple and Regina Spektor as inspirations, stating in an interview for American Songwriter that, “Regina Spektor and Fiona Apple were the reasons that I started writing music. Fiona Apple specifically––I think I saw a video of her playing (the song) “Parting Gifts” and I don’t think I’d ever seen a woman so comfortable with being emotional and, that inspired me more than anything else because, up until then, I was just privately emotional and I didn’t realize that it was like okay to be a woman and not worry about being sexy or like, worried that I was being too angry or too upset or emotional in general.”

Her cover of the George Gershwin song, "But Not for Me", was featured in the first episode of the second season of the CBS All Access show, The Good Fight.

Her debut book, Are You My Uber?, a parody of P.D. Eastman's Are You My Mother?, was published on October 29, 2019, by Running Press.

Her sophomore record, “Is This Heartbreak?”, released on October 23, 2020, to moderate acclaim. American Songwriter praised it, claiming, “Much like the unforeseen of heartbreak itself, Dooley keeps the musicality of her new songs fresh and unpredictable all the way through.”
