= Daniel Brook =

American writer

Daniel Brook (born Brooklyn) is an American urbanist, historian, journalist and author. His articles have appeared in Harper's, The Nation, The New York Times Magazine, and Slate.

== Works ==
=== The Trap ===
Published in 2007, The Trap: Selling Out to Stay Afloat in Winner-Take-All America, argues that increasing income gap puts pressure on educated young Americans to choose between following their interests and dreams or working for a large salary. According to one review, "although once-idealistic college graduates have taken private sector gigs for decades, Brook shows in his new book...that it has now become a financial necessity."

=== A History of Future Cities ===
Published in 2013, the book A History of Future Cities sets out to show that an understanding of the historic development of "instant cities" like St. Petersburg, Mumbai and Shanghai, equips us to understand ongoing developments in modern cities like Dubai. For example, "(a)ll of the questions St. Petersburg raises are still with us: Which way should a city face: outward to the globe, or inward to the nation? What is global and what is local? Is cosmopolitanism a threat to native ways and self-sufficiency or a necessary condition of progress? What does modernity look like, separate from its Western conception?"

According to the author, "We need to understand (these cities) because they’re the places that matter today. I describe them as 'dress rehearsals for the 21st century.' People used to be fascinated with them because they were so unusual. Now, we need to be fascinated with them because the project for which they stand — urbanization/modernization of less developed regions — is the project of our time."

A History of Future Cities was a Publishers Weekly Best New Book of the Week and one of the Washington Post''s ten "Favorite Books of 2013."

== Bibliography ==
=== Books ===
- Brook, Daniel (2007). The Trap: Selling Out to Stay Afloat in Winner-Take-All America. New York: Times Books. ISBN 978-0-8050-8065-0.
- — (2013). A History of Future Cities. New York, NY: W. W. Norton & Company. ISBN 978-0-393-08924-0.
- — (2019). The Accident of Color: a Story of Race in Reconstruction. New York, NY: W. W. Norton & Company. ISBN 978-0-393-24744-2.
- — (2025). The Einstein of Sex: Dr. Magnus Hirschfeld, Visionary of Weimar Berlin. New York, NY: W. W. Norton & Company. ISBN 978-1-324-00724-1.

=== Essays and reporting ===
- Brook, Daniel (November 2012). "New Hampshire Goddam: The past and future of the Voting Rights Act". Annotation. Harper's Magazine. Vol. 325, no. 1950. pp. 68–69.
