= Francesca Wade =

British biographer

Francesca Wade (born 1989) is a British biographer and literary critic.

She was Evelyn Green Davis Fellow at the Harvard Radcliffe Institute, Jean Strouse Fellow at the Dorothy and Lewis B. Cullman Center for Scholars and Writers at the New York Public Library, and Donald C. Gallup Fellow in American Literature at the Beinecke Rare Books and Manuscript Library. Her debut book Square Haunting was longlisted for the Baillie Gifford Prize.

Her work has appeared in the Apollo Magazine, The New York Times, New York Review of Books, London Review of Books, Paris Review, and Granta.

== Early life and education ==
Francesca Wade was born in 1989 and is from North London. Wade attended North London Collegiate School, completing her A Levels in 2008. She went on to study classics at Brasenose College, Oxford.

== Works ==
- Square Haunting: Five Women, Freedom and London Between the Wars (2020)
- Gertrude Stein: an Afterlife (2025).
