= Molly Beth Griffin =

American author

Molly Beth Griffin is an American author of children's and young adult books.

Griffin received a Master of Fine Arts from Hamline University. She teaches writing at The Loft Literary Center.

Griffin's first young adult novel, Silhouette of a Sparrow, was published by Milkweed Editions in 2013. The novel was a finalist for the Lambda Literary Award for Young Adult Literature, and the American Library Association included it on its 2013 Amelia Bloomer Book List.

In 2022, the Association for Library Service to Children named Ten Beautiful Things among its annual list of Notable Children's Books.

Two of Griffin's books are Junior Library Guild selections: Ten Beautiful Things (2021) and Just Us (2024).

== Publications ==
=== Picture books ===
- Griffin, Molly Beth (2011). Loon Baby. Illustrated by Anne Hunter. HMH Books for Young Readers. ISBN 978-0-547-25487-6.
- Griffin, Molly Beth (2014). Rhoda's Rock Hunt. Illustrated by Jennifer A. Bell. Minnesota Historical Society Press. ISBN 0873519507.
- Griffin, Molly Beth (2021). Ten Beautiful Things. Illustrated by Maribel LeChuga. Charlesbridge. ISBN 978-1-580-89936-9.
- Griffin, Molly Beth (2022). The Big Leaf Leap. Illustrated by Meleck Davis. Minnesota Historical Society Press. ISBN 978-1-681-34203-0.
- Griffin, Molly Beth (2024). Just Us. Illustrated by Anait Semirdzhyan. Charlesbridge. ISBN 978-1-62354-443-0.
- Griffin, Molly Beth (2025). Far, Far Away. Illustrated by Bao Luu. Charlesbridge. ISBN 978-1-62354-363-1.
- Griffin, Molly Beth (2025). Rings of Heartwood: Poems on Growing. Illustrated by Claudia McGehee. Minnesota Historical Society Press. ISBN 978-1-681-34232-0.

=== Beginning readers ===
==== School Sidekicks Series ====
- Griffin, Molly Beth (2019). Field Day Fun. Illustrated by Mike Deas. Picture Window Books. ISBN 978-1-515-84418-1.
- Griffin, Molly Beth (2019). Field Trip Trouble. Illustrated by Mike Deas. Picture Window Books. ISBN 978-1-515-84416-7.
- Griffin, Molly Beth (2019). Friends All Day. Illustrated by Colin Jack. Picture Window Books. ISBN 978-1-515-83887-6.
- Griffin, Molly Beth (2019). Hard Hat Heroes. Illustrated by Mike Deas. Picture Window Books. ISBN 978-1-515-84417-4.
- Griffin, Molly Beth (2019). A New Year. Illustrated by Colin Jack. Picture Window Books. ISBN 978-1-515-83890-6.
- Griffin, Molly Beth (2019). Party Time. Illustrated by Colin Jack. Picture Window Books. ISBN 978-1-515-83889-0.
- Griffin, Molly Beth (2019). Plans Gone Wrong. Illustrated by Colin Jack. Picture Window Books. ISBN 978-1-515-83888-3.
- Griffin, Molly Beth (2019). Test Stress. Illustrated by Mike Deas. Picture Window Books. ISBN 978-1-515-84419-8.

=== Poetry ===
- Griffin, Molly Beth (2018). All the Hollow Places. Finishing Line Press. ISBN 978-1-635-34808-8.
- Griffin, Molly Beth (2018). Under Our Feet. Finishing Line Press. ISBN 978-1-635-34429-5.

=== Young adult ===
- Griffin, Molly Beth (2013). Silhouette of a Sparrow. Milkweed Editions. ISBN 978-1-57131-701-8.

== Externals links ==
- Official website
