= Vincent Kirsch =

Children's books writer and illustrator

- Alma mater: Syracuse University
- Writing career
- Notable work: From Archie to Zack (2020)
- Website: vincentxkirsch.com

Vincent Xavier Kirsch is a writer and illustrator of children's books.

Kirsch was raised in New York and studied advertising and filmmaking at Syracuse University. He did not find success as a picture book artist until an editor noticed his work 24 years later.As of 2026, he has published eleven books as author and illustrator, as well as four books as illustrator alone.

As of 2026, Kirsch is pursuing a Master of Fine Arts in writing for children ad young adults at Hamline University.

== Select works ==
=== Two Little Boys from Toolittle Toys (2010) ===
Two Little Boys from Toolittle Toys is a picture book published by Bloomsbury Publishing on August 1, 2010. The story centers Rudy and Ridley Toolittle, who test toys at the Toolittle Toy Company. When Rudy starts getting older and loses interest in playing with the toys, Ridley must find new ways to engage him.

Kirkus Reviews praised the book's "watercolor, graphite and colored-pencil illustrations" that "children will pore over". School Library Journal's Heather Acerro similarly discussed how "Kirsch has created a magical world that any child would long to get lost in". Beyond the illustrations, Kirkus Reviews discussed "the book’s more complicated, and rather adult, theme: what it means to make work play and what happens when you turn play into work". Publishers Weekly also discussed this theme, calling the main idea "a cumbersome story", while stating that "the plot doesn't always make logical sense".

=== Forsythia & Me (2011) ===
Forsythia & Me: A Book About Two Amazing Friends is a picture book published by Farrar, Straus and Giroux in January 2011. The book centers Chester and his best friend, Forsythia, who is seemingly good at everything, which makes Chester happy and proud. However, when Forsythia gets sick, Chester develops his own talents to help her feel better. Forsythia & Me features "spindly ink drawings and lavish detailing", which Publishers Weekly found "evince an appealingly batty aesthetic".

=== The Chandeliers (2012) ===
The Chandeliers is a picture book published by Farrar, Straus and Giroux on August 7, 2012. The story centers the a family of giraffes with the surname Chandelier who perform theatrically. Although young Rufus is too young to perform, he helps his family as a stagehand.

Reviewers appreciated Kirsch's illustrations, with Publishers Weekly describing them as "bubbly" and "exuberant". Kirkus Reviews added that "there are humorous visual details in the bustling watercolor-and-line compositions, and children will enjoy searching for the tiny mouse wearing a giraffe costume in every scene". While Publishers Weekly found that the story provides "a delightful turn on the theme of the quiet child who becomes a hero", Kirkus felt that "the narrative loses steam".

=== Freddie and Gingersnap series ===
Freddie and Gingersnap is a picture book published by Disney-Hyperion on January 14, 2014. The story centers Freddie, a green dinosaur, and Gingersnap, a purple dragon. Although the species have historically stayed apart, Freddie and Gingersnap develop a friendship through their mutual interests, despite their initial attempts to fight. The book includes many "lively onomatopoeic action words", with " fluid watercolor and ink illustrations".

Kirkus Reviews called Freddie and Gingersnap "a light look at childhood friendship and the complicated, primitive feelings that often accompany any relationship". Publishers Weekly was less impressed with the story, writing that it "is hard to track [...], and its lackadaisical use of sound cues and repetition [...] comes across more like an attempt to cover up a lack of story than a means to draw readers in". However, they applauded the illustrations, noting that "Kirsch’s naïf drawing style gives the spreads a kooky 1960s feel", with the characters' depictions being "undeniably adorable".

Freddie and Gingersnap was followed by Freddie & Gingersnap Find a Cloud to Keep, a picture book published by Disney-Hyperion on January 6, 2015. The book continues Freddie and Gingersnap's friendship as Freddie looks for a cloud to keep, despite Gingersnap's reminders that clouds cannot be kept. The duo soon discover a hot air balloon with people inside it, which Freddie and Gingersnap mistake for a cloud.

Publishers Weekly called "Freddie and Gingersnap’s world [...] a trippy, nonsensical one, where just about anything can happen". The book includes "black outlines and intense colors" that Kirkus Reviews thought "show up well against the mostly blue backgrounds, while the textures of paper and paint add visual interest". Kirkus concluded that "though the story is simply told, the overall effect is somewhat cryptic, making it a challenge to connect with these characters and their quest".

=== Gingerbread for Liberty! (2015) ===
Gingerbread for Liberty! How a German Baker Helped Win the American Revolution, written by Mara Rockliff, was published by Houghton Mifflin Harcourt on January 13, 2015.

=== The Hole Story of the Doughnut (2016) ===
The Hole Story of the Doughnut, written by Pat Miller, was published by Houghton Mifflin Harcourt on May 3, 2016.

The Hole Story of the Doughnut was a finalist for the 2017 Children’s and Teen Choice Book Award for Third to Fourth Grade.

=== Can You Find Pup? series ===
Can You Find Pup? was published by Holiday House on October 23, 2018.

Can You Find Pup? is a Junior Library Guild book.

Can You Find Pup? was followed by Can Pup Find the Pups?, published by Holiday House on January 11, 2022.

=== From Archie to Zack (2020) ===
From Archie to Zack was published by Abrams Books for Young Readers on December 29, 2020. From Archie to Zack received a starred review from School Library Journal.

In 2021, From Archie to Zack was a finalist for the Golden Kite Award for Nonfiction Text for Younger Readers, and the Lambda Literary Award for Children's and Young Adult Literature.

=== O.K. Is Gay (2025) ===
O.K. Is Gay was published by Abrams Books for Young Readers on May 6, 2025.

O.K. Is Gay was a finalist for the 2026 Lambda Literary Award for Children's Literature.

== Awards and honors ==
Awards for Kirsch's work
Year	Title	Award	Result	Ref.
2017	The Hole Story of the Doughnut	Children’s and Teen Choice Book Award for Third to Fourth Grade	Finalist	
2021	From Archie to Zack	Golden Kite Award for Nonfiction Text for Younger Readers	Finalist	
2021	From Archie to Zack	Lambda Literary Award for Children's and Young Adult Literature	Finalist	
2026	O.K. Is Gay	Lambda Literary Award for Children's Literature	Finalist	

== Publications ==
=== As author ===
- Kirsch, Vincent X. (2008). Natalie & Naughtily. New York: Bloomsbury Children's Books. ISBN 978-1-59990-269-2.
- Kirsch, Vincent X. (2010). Two Little Boys from Toolittle Toys. Bloomsbury. ISBN 978-1-599-90428-3.
- Kirsch, Vincent X. (2011). Forsythia & Me: A Book About Two Amazing Friends. Farrar, Strauss, & Giroux. ISBN 978-0-374-32438-4.
- Kirsch, Vincent X. (2012). The Chandeliers. New York: Farrar Straus Giroux. ISBN 978-0-374-39898-9.
- Kirsch, Vincent X. (2013). Freddie & Gingersnap. New York: Disney Hyperion Books. ISBN 978-1-4231-5958-2.
- Kirsch, Vincent X. (2015). Freddie & Gingersnap Find a Cloud to Keep. New York: Disney-Hyperion. ISBN 978-1-4231-5976-6.
- Kirsch, Vincent X. (2018). Can You Find Pup?. New York: Holiday House. ISBN 978-0-8234-3940-9.
- Kirsch, Vincent X. (2019). How I Learned to Fall Out of Trees. New York: Abrams Books for Young Readers. ISBN 978-1-4197-3413-7.
- Kirsch, Vincent X. (2020). From Archie to Zack. New York: Abrams Books for Young Readers. ISBN 978-1-4197-4367-2.
- Kirsch, Vincent X. (2022). Can Pup Find the Pups?. New York: Holiday House. ISBN 978-0-8234-4605-6.
- Kirsch, Vincent X. (2025). O.K. is Gay. New York: Abrams Books for Young Readers. ISBN 978-1-419-77079-1.

=== As illustrator ===
- Ferris, Jeri (2012). Noah Webster and His Words. Houghton Mifflin Books for children. Illustrated by Vincent X. Kirsch. Boston: Houghton Mifflin Harcourt. ISBN 978-0-547-39055-0.
- Rockliff, Mara (2015). Gingerbread for Liberty! How a German Baker Helped Win the American Revolution. Illustrated by Vincent Xavier Kirsch. Boston New York: Houghton Mifflin Harcourt. ISBN 978-0-544-13001-2.
- Miller, Pat (2016). The Hole Story of the Doughnut. Illustrated by Vincent X. Kirsch. Boston, MA: Houghton Mifflin Harcourt. ISBN 978-0-544-31961-5.
- LaReau, Kara (2022). Extra Ezra Makes an Extra-Special Friend. Illustrated by Vincent X. Kirsch. New York: Harper. ISBN 978-0-062-96565-3.
