= Rainie Oet =

Novelist and poet

- Education: Syracuse University (MFA)
- Writing career
- Notable awards: Lambda Literary Award for Middle Grade Literature (2026)
- Website: rainieoet.com

Rainie Oet is a novelist and poet. She is the author of the poetry collections No Mark Spiral (2018), Porcupine in Freefall (2019), Inside Ball Lightning (2020), and Glorious Veils of Diane (2021); the picture books Monster Seek and Robin's Worlds (2024); and the middle grade novel Glitch Girl! (2025). Glitch Girl! won the 2026 Lambda Literary Award for Middle Grade Literature.

Oet earned a Master of Fine Arts in poetry from Syracuse University.

She is transgender. As of 2025, she lived in Los Angeles.

== Writing ==
=== Robin's Worlds (2024) ===
Robin's World, illustrated by Mathias Ball, is a picture book published by Astra Young Readers in 2024. The book centers Robin as they celebrate their eighth birthday alone. The celebration begins ordinarily as they eat dinner with their cat Skipper while their guardian, Uncle Miles, is out. Before their Uncle Miles arrives home, the Cat-Headed Wanderer takes Robin to a fantastical event.

Robin's Worlds received mixed reviews, with reviewers primarily criticizing the text. Kirkus Reviews stated that "an uneven plot leaves this tale without much sparkle", while Publishers Weekly described the text as "lengthy and "affecting" as it "explores layers of grief and joy". School Library Journal's Terry Hong noted that the text includes "narrative hiccups". Discussing the illustrations, Publishers Weekly highlighted how the "vibrant hues and detailed character designs [...] breathe life into each dreamlike scene as the evening tenderly paves the way for a solitary child to find connection in the real world". Kirkus Reviews also noted that "Ball’s swirling comic images set an enchanting tone".

=== Glitch Girl! (2025) ===
Glitch Girl! is a middle-grade novel-in-verse, published by Kokila in March 2025. Inspired by Oet's life, the novel follows J-- from fifth to seventh grade in the mid-2000s. The child of Russian Jewish immigrants, J-- is an ADHD and nonbinary trans girl who uses she/they pronouns. (Note: This summary uses she/her pronouns for consistency.) Although J-- desires to be good, she feels as though she isn't accepted by most others in her life, including her parents, teachers, classmates, and guests in the roller coaster simulator she plays, Coaster Boss. Upon meeting Junie at the beginning of fifth grade, J-- develops a crush on her alongside their blooming friendship; overtime, the crush becomes obsessive, even as their friendship dissolves. When J-- joins a fencing team, she finally begins to build healthy connections. The novel explores themes related to trauma, abuse, romantic obsession, neurodivergence, and gender identity.

Instead of utilizing the protagonist's deadname, the novel stylistically refers to her as J--.

Stylistically, Glitch Girl! is "written in spare, direct verse". According to Shelf Awareness's Kieran Slattery, "The medium echoes the turmoil with punchy, blunt poems that give way to longer, lyrical passages rich with metaphor." Slatterly also discussed how "Oet masterfully uses the game as an allegory for J--'s struggle to accept her intersecting identities".

Glitch Girl! won the 2026 Lambda Literary Award for Middle Grade Literature.

== Publications ==
=== Children's books ===
- Monster Seek. Astra Young Readers. ISBN 978-1-662-62015-7.
- Robin's Worlds. Illustrated by Mathias Ball. Astra Young Readers. 2024. ISBN 978-1-662-62002-7.
- Glitch Girl!. Kokila. 2025. ISBN 978-0-593-69651-4.

=== Poetry collections ===
- No Mark Spiral. CutBank Books. 2018. ISBN 978-1-939-71723-8.
- Porcupine in Freefall. Bright Hill Press. 2019. ISBN 978-1-892-47102-4.
- Inside Ball Lightning. Southeast Missouri State University Press. 2020. ISBN 978-1-732-03995-7.
- Glorious Veils of Diane. Carnegie Mellon University Press. 2021. ISBN 978-0-887-48669-2.
