= Jerrold Connors =

Children's book author and illustrator

- Born: United States
- Notable awards: Lambda Literary Award for Children's Literature (2026)

Website
- jerroldconnors.com

Jerrold Connors is a children's book author and illustrator. He is the author of Jim! (2025) and Stampede (2026). In 2026, Jim! won the Lambda Literary Award for Children's Literature.

Connors was born in the United States, then grew up in Indonesia and Canada. As of 2026, he lives in the San Francisco Bay Area.

== Writing ==
=== Jim! (2025) ===
Connors's debut book, JIM! Six True Stories about One Great Artist: James Marshall, is a biographical picture book published by The Dial Press in May 2025. Using six stories, akin to Marshall's own work, Jim! introduces children to American children's books author and illustrator James Marshall (1942–1992), including stories about how he became an artist, relationships with American illustrator and writers Arnold Lobel (1933–1987) and Maurice Sendak (1928–2012), a school visit that tells the origin of the Viola Swamp character, and Marshall's death from AIDS in 1992. The book's illustrations have also been called reminiscent of Marshall's artistic style. Jim! includes an author's note with more information about Marshall's life, including age appropriate information about AIDS.

Jim! was well received by critics, including starred reviews from Booklist and Kirkus Reviews, with Kirkus calling the book "charming, funny, strange, and sad". April Spisak, writing for The Bulletin of the Center for Children's Books, described the book as "extraordinarily tender and clever".

The book won the 2026 Lambda Literary Award for Children's Literature, and the Association for Library Service to Children named it among their Notable Children's Books of 2026.

=== Stampede (2026) ===
Stampede is a children's picture book published by Union Square Kids in August 2026. The book centers two cows, Jasper and Cleo, who are feeling restless, a feeling that is relieved when another cow in the herd accidentally starts a stampede, resulting in cows running through various areas, including a farmer's market, a movie theater, the rain forest, and under the sea. A map of locations visited is included at the end of the book.

Stampede was well received by critics, including a starred review from Kirkus Reviews and School Library Journal, with Kirkus stating that the book's humor is reminiscent of Looney Tunes.

== Publications ==
- JIM! Six True Stories about One Great Artist: James Marshall. Dial. 2025. ISBN 978-0-5938-5934-6.
- Stampede!. Union Square. 2026. ISBN 978-1-4549-5922-9.
