= A. J. Irving =

American children's book author

- Occupation: Children's book author
- Education: University of Oregon (BA)

Website
- ajirving.com

A. J. Irving is an American children's book author. She is the author of Dance Like a Leaf (2020), The Wishing Flower (2023), and The Bi Book (2025).

Irving grew up in Boise, Idaho. She received a Bachelor of Arts in journalism and women's and gender studies from the University of Oregon. As of 2026, she lives in Salt Lake City, Utah with her husband and two children.

== Dance Like a Leaf (2020) ==
Dance Like a Leaf, illustrated by Claudia Navarro, was published by Barefoot Books in 2020. The book focuses on a young girl and her grandmother as the grandmother's health declines and the girl is eventually left sitting on a bed alone. It has been translated into Spanish as Baila como una hoja by María A. Pérez and into French as Danser comme une feuille by Jennifer Couëlle.

Dance Like a Leaf received a starred review from School Library Journal, whose Robbin E. Friedman wrote that the "evocative pairing of story and art creates a tone poem and lesson, a lovely reflection on the seasons of life, and a gentle lead-in to discussion of death and renewal". Speaking directly to the book's illustrations, Friedman added that "the emotional weight of the impending loss emerges clearly in the two characters' body language".

Bank Street College of Education named Dance Like a Leaf a book of "outstanding merit" for children ages five to nine. The Chicago Public Library included Baila como una hoja on their list of the best picture books of 2020.

== The Wishing Flower (2023) ==
The Wishing Flower, illustrated by Kip Alizadeh, was published by Alfred A. Knopf in 2023. The book focuses on two girls: Birdie and Sunny. Birdie is pale-skinned and has short, curly red hair, while Sunny has beige skin and long, dark hair. Birdie enjoys making wishes on dandelions but does not have friends until Sunny arrives at school, at which point Birdie feels like "two dragonflies played tag in Birdie's tummy" and her "heart fluttered as fast as a hummingbird's wings".

The book was well received by critics, including starred reviews from Kirkus Reviews School Library Journal. Kirkus described the book as "an expertly drawn and composed introduction to self-discovery". Speaking to the book's writing, School Library Journal's Danielle Schwessinger highlighted how "the use of imagery [...] bring the girls to life", as well as how "the alliteration creates a strong read-aloud flow to the story and emphasizes the focus on nature." Publishers Weekly noted how, between the text and illustrations, "the vibe turns lyrical and impressionistic after the two girls connect [...] showing exactly how it feels to be seen and understood as never before". Regarding Alizadeh's illustrations, Kirkus Reviews discussed how the "loose lines and vibrant springtime hues of deep green, blue, and purple lend a playful aura to the girls' interactions, at times even seeming ethereal and otherworldly." They added that the "smaller vignettes pair well with larger spreads that alternate close-up and distant perspectives, drawing readers into the drama of new friendships and Birdie's social-emotional development."

The Wishing Flower was a finalist for the 2024 Lambda Literary Award for Children's and Young Adult Literature.

== The Bi Book (2025) ==
The Bi Book, illustrated by Cynthia Alonso, was published by Alfred A. Knopf in 2025. The book focuses on two girls at the beach and includes words that use the prefix bi, including bicycle, bivalvle, biracial, and bisexual, the latter of which Irving notes can mean "more than two".

The Bi Book was well received by critics, including a starred review from Booklist, who described the book as "a sweet, loving lesson in language and love, on a subject rarely covered." Reviewers spoke to the book's writing, illustrations, and message about inclusion. In regards to the writing, Kirkus Reviews noted that "some of the concepts will be a bit abstract for young readers", though this is supported through a "much-needed glossary". Reviewers praised Alonso's illustrations, "done using dry pastels, wax crayons, and colored pencils", which "rely heavily on the iconic pink, purple, and blue of the bi flag, particularly in the final spread". Booklist's Ronny Khuri argued that the "artwork brings an undeniable exuberance to the proceedings, setting it all on a softly etched, brightly colored beach setting populated by smiling people".

According to Publishers Weekly, "the creators straightforwardly establish bisexuality as another part of a wide world full of words—and worthy of the same understanding". Khuri noted that the writing and illustrations provide "a simple approach that bridges an understanding of language to an expression of identity, infusing it all with an appropriate sense of peace, pride, and community".

The Bi Book is a finalist for the 2026 Lambda Literary Award for Children's and Young Adult Literature.

== Publications ==
- Dance Like a Leaf. Illustrated by Claudia Navarro. Barefoot Books. 2020.
  - Baila como una hoja. Illustrated by Claudia Navarro and translated by María A. Pérez. Barefoot Books. 2020.
  - Danser comme une feuille. Illustrated by Claudia Navarro and translated by Jennifer Couëlle. Barefoot Books. 2020.
- The Wishing Flower. Illustrated by Kip Alizadeh. Alfred A. Knopf. 2023.
- The Bi Book. Illustrated by Cynthia Alonso. Alfred A. Knopf. 2025.
