= Taylor Tracy =

American uthor of middle-grade novels

- Occupation: Children's book author
- Genre: Middle grade fiction

Website
- taylorismyfirstname.com

Taylor Tracy is an American author of middle grade fiction. Her publications include Murray Out of Water (2024) and Pasta Girls (2025). As of 2026, she lives in New Jersey.

== Murray Out of Water (2024) ==
Murray Out of Water is a middle grade verse novel published by Quill Tree Books in 2024. The novel centers Murray O'Shea, a 12-year-old living in New Jersey with a deep and magical connection to the ocean. After a hurricane destroys their home, Murray and her sister move to upstate New York to live with their aunt and uncle. In New York, Murray senses a loss of her connection to the ocean, though she connects with her non-binary cousin Blake, gay estranged older brother Patrick, and new friend Dylan, who is bullied for being gay. While settling into her new environment and attempting to recover her magical connection to the ocean, Murray questions her gender identity and sexual orientation.

Kirkus Reviews referred to Murray Out of Water as "a heartfelt examination of queer identity through the lens of one lovable kid", while highlighting how the "novel in verse combines beautiful language [...] with emotional honesty to create a resonant story of identity and growing up". Kate Quealy-Gainer, writing for The Bulletin of the Center for Children's Books, had a less positive review. Quealy-Gainer argued that the plot is "is disjointed and unfocused, with threads left hanging and little thematic continuity, and the magical realism element proves especially baffling when Dylan also turns out to have a power with music that is neither explained well nor successfully used as part of his character development". Quealy-Gainer added that "the unmetered verse adds to the scattered feeling, but the imagery is sensory and engaging while Murray's voice is accessible in her awkward fumbling toward agency and identity".

School Library Journal named Murray Out of Water one of the best middle grade books of 2024. The following year, the novel was a finalist for the Lambda Literary Award for Middle Grade Literature, and was named an honor book for the Stonewall Book Award. The Bank Street College of Education named it one of the year's best novels for children ages 12 to 14. The American Library Association included it on their 2025 Rainbow List, and the Association for Library Service to Children named it a 2025 Notable Children's Book.

== Pasta Girls (2025) ==
Pasta Girls is a middle grade novel published by Quill Tree Books in 2025. A reimagining of Romeo and Juliet, the book centers two neurodivergent girls. Julianna "Jules" Cangelosi, an anxious, autistic 13-year-old, decides to attend the San Gennaro festival in Little Italy, Manhattan, where she meets Romea "Ro" Marino, a 14-year-old Eagle Scout with ADHD. Although their families own rival restaurants, the girls develop a friendship and eventually, a romance.

Kirkus Reviews referred to Pasta Girls as "an inclusive, well-characterized reimagining of a classic". While noting that "the earnest leads' sweetly satisfying romance eschews tragic Shakespearean conventions", Publishers Weekly praised the "mouthwatering descriptions of food [that] handily conjure the atmosphere of the festival season". Kirkus noted that the narrators feel "introspective" and "fully fleshed-out ", though the shared narrative sometimes feels "unnecessarily repetitive and detailed".

Pasta Girls is a finalist for the 2026 Lambda Literary Award for Middle Grade Literature.

== Publications ==
- Murray Out of Water. Quill Tree Books. 2024.
- Pasta Girls. Quill Tree Books. 2025. ISBN 978-0-06-332686-6.
