= S. Bear Bergman =

American transgender man, author, poet, playwright, and theater artist

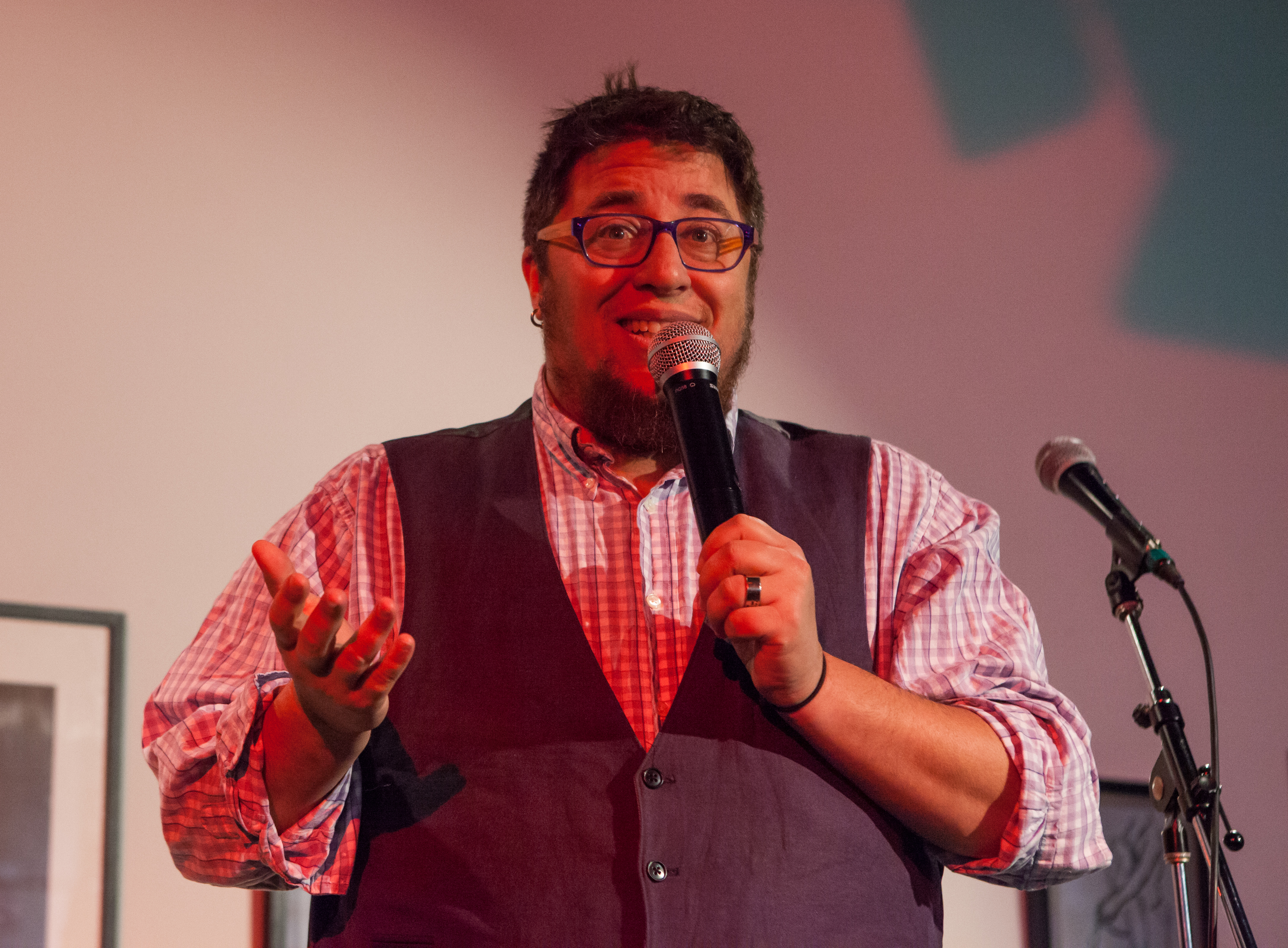
- Bergman at the Center for Sex and Culture, San Francisco
- Born: September 22, 1974 (age 51); United States
- Occupations: Writer, theater artist
- Spouse: j. wallace skelton
- Writing career
- Language: English
- Period: 2002–present
- Subject: LGBT
- Notable work: Butch Is A Noun
- Website: www.sbearbergman.com

S. Bear Bergman (born September 22, 1974) is an American author, poet, playwright, and theater artist. He is a trans man, and his gender identity is a main focus of his artwork.

== Early life and education ==
Bergman, who was educated at Concord Academy, was one of the founders of the first Gay–straight alliance and a member of the Governor of Massachusetts' Safe Schools Commission for LGBT youth. He received a Bachelor of Fine Arts degree from Hampshire College in 1996.

== Career ==
Bergman's first book, Butch Is A Noun, was released in September 2006 by Suspect Thoughts Press and was nominated for a Lambda Literary Award in the LGBT Nonfiction category. A new edition was published by Arsenal Pulp Press in 2010. Bergman's second book, The Nearest Exit May Be Behind You, was released by Arsenal Pulp Press in the fall of 2009 and was a finalist for the Lambda Literary Award for Transgender Literature.

With genderqueer author Kate Bornstein, Bergman co-edited Gender Outlaws: The Next Generation. It won a 2011 Lambda Literary Award in the LGBT Anthology category and a special Judges Award from the Publishing Triangle.

Bergman is also the author of four books for children (one of which, The Adventures of Tulip, Birthday Wish Fairy, was a 2013 Lambda Literary Award finalist in the LGBT Children's/Young Adult category). He initially wrote The Adventures of Tulip and Backwards Day upon the request of a friend who ran the Gender Spectrum conference in the 2000s. They wanted affirming children's stories with diverse examples of gender and sexuality to read to kids at the conference, and could not find any before asking Bergman to create some. The stories were very popular with parents at the conference, inspiring Bergman to publish the books and later create the Flamingo Rampant children's press.

Bergman's sixth book, titled Blood, Marriage, Wine & Glitter, was published September 23, 2013 from Arsenal Pulp Press. This book was a finalist for the 2014 Lambda Literary Award for Transgender Nonfiction.

In addition, Bergman continues to lecture and perform at universities, festivals and theatres throughout the United States, Canada, and the United Kingdom.

=== Flamingo Rampant ===
Bergman is the founder and publisher of Flamingo Rampant, a micropress focused on making celebratory, inclusive picture books for LGBT2Q+ children and families. Some of the values the press wants to promote include racial justice and disability pride.

Bergman was inspired to create the press after failing to find joyful LGBTQ children's literature for his children, instead finding that most works on queer families centered on experiences of bullying and harassment. He and his husband launched a Kickstarter campaign to fund their new press, and they began publishing children's literature in 2014. They wanted the books to be accessible to students at schools and libraries, but found it was difficult for those institutions to order their books without using a large distribution company. Instead, they relied on personal outreach and donated books to each school in the Toronto District School Board. Later they prioritized getting books to regions that censored this genre of books, focusing on distribution to Alabama, Florida, and Texas.

As of 2022, Flamingo Rampant had published 20 books.

=== Columnist ===
Bergman also writes the popular advice column Asking Bear, which ran on the Bitch Media platform from 2015 to 2017 and is now an independent column.

== Personal life ==
Bergman lives in Regina, Saskatchewan, and is married to educator j wallace skelton. They have three children. Bergman has openly discussed his polyamorous orientation in his essays.

== Awards ==
Bergman's written work has been nominated for multiple Lambda Literary Awards, and Gender Outlaws: The Next Generation, edited with Kate Bornstein, won the 2011 Lambda Literary Award for LGBT Anthology as well as a special Judges Award from the Publishing Triangle.

Bergman's performances have received judges' awards at each of the last three biennial National Gay & Lesbian Theatre Festival in Columbus, Ohio, including Best of the Festival and Best New Work. In 2005, Bergman was awarded a Massachusetts Cultural Council grant for playwriting, as well as a Millay Colony for the Arts Fellowship award. He has also been given an assortment of honors for service to the transgender community, including The Spirit of Stonewall Award, the Trans 100 has been selected to the Toronto Arts Council Leaders Lab for his work in equity in the arts, and similar.

== Books ==
- Special Topics in Being a Parent: A Queer and Tender Guide to Things I've Learned about Parenting, Mostly The Hard Way 2024, Arsenal Pulp Press, ISBN 9781551529394
- Special Topics in Being a Human: A Queer and Tender Guide to Things I've Learned the Hard Way about Caring For People, Including Myself 2021, Arsenal Pulp Press, ISBN 978-1551528540
- Blood, Marriage, Wine & Glitter 2013, Arsenal Pulp Press, ISBN 978-1-55152-511-2
- The Adventures of Tulip, Birthday Wish Fairy 2012, Flamingo Rampant, ISBN 978-0987976307
- Backwards Day 2012, Flamingo Rampant, ISBN 978-0987976314
- Gender Outlaws: The Next Generation co-edited with Kate Bornstein. 2010, Seal Press ISBN 978-1-58005-308-2
- The Nearest Exit May Be Behind You 2009, Arsenal Pulp Press, ISBN 978-1-55152-264-7
- Butch Is A Noun 2006, reissued 2010, Arsenal Pulp Press, ISBN 978-1-55152-369-9

== Theater and performance ==
- Gender Reveal Party
- Machatunim
- The Virginity Lost & Found
- Monday Night in Westerbork
- Clearly Marked
- You'll Never Piss In This Town Again
- Ex Post Papa
- The First Jew in Canada: A Trans Tale
