= Riley Redgate =

American author of young adult fiction

- Born: Ríoghnach Robinson
- Education: Kenyon College (BA, 2016)
- Occupation: Author
- Writing career
- Period: 2016–present
- Genre: Young adult fiction
- Notable awards: Lambda Literary Award for Young Adult Literature (2026)
- Website: rileyredgate.com

Riley Redgate is the pen name of Ríoghnach Robinson (/ˈriːənɒk/), an American author of young adult fiction.

== Biography ==
Robinson was raised in Winston-Salem, North Carolina. She attended Richard J. Reynolds High School, where she began her first novel, Seven Ways We Lie. She is an alumna of Kenyon College in Gambier, Ohio, where she majored in economics, graduating in 2016. Her debut novel was published before she graduated. While at Kenyon, Robinson won the college's James E. Michael Playwriting Award for her play Mourning Sickness.

Robinson worked from Chicago as writing apprentice for the satirical media outlet The Onion. Her novels include Seven Ways We Lie (2016), Noteworthy (2017), Final Draft (2018), and Look No Further (2023), all published by Amulet, an imprint of Abrams Books; Alone Out Here (2022), published by Disney-Hyperion; Come Home to My Heart (2026), published by Union Square & Co., and Bad Words (2026), her adult debut published by St. Martin's Press. Come Home to My Heart won the 2026 Lambda Literary Award for Young Adult Literature.

Robinson is bisexual and of half-Irish and half-Chinese descent.

== Pen name ==
Robinson choose the pseudonym Riley Redgate when she was 16 years old, brainstorming it with the help of other members of a writers' forum. Her composition criteria consisted of three things: something with her real initials, something gender neutral, and something easily pronounceable.

== Works ==
- Seven Ways We Lie (2016)
- Noteworthy (2017)
- Final Draft (2018)
- Alone Out Here (2022)
- Look No Further (2023) (as Ríoghnach Robinson, with Siofra Robinson)
- Come Home to My Heart (2026)
- Bad Words (2026) (as Ríoghnach Robinson)

== Discography ==
=== As Ríoghnach Robinson ===
- Tattoos (2013)
- Somebody Say Something (2014)
- two-quarter songs (2014)
- Noteworthy OST (2016)
- goodnight goodbye (2016)
- quarantine music (2020)

=== As Catholique ===
- Season's Feelings (2022)
