= Michael Leali =

American writer and educator

Michael Leali is an American writer and educator. His debut novel, The Civil War of Amos Abernathy, won the 2023 Golden Kite Award. His first and second novels were finalists for the Lambda Literary Award for Middle Grade Literature.

== Early life and education ==
Leali was born and raised outside of Chicago.

He received a bachelor's degree in English secondary education and music from the University of Iowa in 2013, followed by a Master of Fine Arts in children's and young adult literature from Vermont College of Fine Arts.

== Career ==
Leali began his career working in marketing for the Oswegoland Park District; he was also the administrative director for the Limelight Theatre Company. He eventually was hired to teach English-related courses at Oswego High School. After teaching there for a few years, he changed positions regularly, including working with independent bookshops. During the COVID-19 pandemic, Leali returned to teaching at Oswego High School.

Leali published his debut novel, The Civil War of Amos Abernathy, with HarperCollins in 2022. The following year, the book won the Golden Kite Award, and was a finalist for the Lambda Literary Award for Middle Grade Literature. Leali's sophomore novel, Matteo, was published by HarperCollins in 2023. It was a finalist for the 2024 Lambda Literary Award for Middle Grade Literature. Leli's third novel, The Truth About Triangles was published by HarperCollins in 2024.

== Awards and honors ==
In 2022, Booklist included The Civil War of Amos Abernathy on their list of the "Top 10 First Novels for Youth"; they also included it on their 2023 Rainbow List.

Awards for Leali's writing
Year	Title	Award	Result	Ref.
2023	The Civil War of Amos Abernathy	Golden Kite Award	Won	
2023	The Civil War of Amos Abernathy	Lambda Literary Award for Middle Grade Literature	Finalist	
2024	Matteo	Lambda Literary Award for Middle Grade Literature	Finalist	

== Personal life ==
Leali lives in San Francisco.

== Publications ==
- The Civil War of Amos Abernathy. HarperCollins Children’s. 2022. ISBN 978-0-06-311986-4.
- Matteo. HarperCollins Children’s. 2023. ISBN 978-0-06-311991-8.
- The Truth About Triangles. HarperCollins Children’s. 2024. ISBN 978-0-06-311986-4.
