= Michelle Young =

Michelle Young may refer to:

- Michelle Young (musician), American musician
- Michelle Young (television personality) (born 1993), American television personality
