= Andrea Beatriz Arango =

Puerto Rican writer of children's fiction

Andrea Beatriz Arango is a Puerto Rican children's book author of four novels: Iveliz Explains It All (2022), Something Like Home (2023), It's All or Nothing, Vale (2025), and No Place on Earth (2026). Arango's books discuss themes such as mental health (Iveliz Explains It All), racism (Iveliz Explains It All), xenophobia (Iveliz Explains It All), and acquired disability (It's All or Nothing, Vale).

In 2023, Iveliz Explains It All was named an honor book for the Newbery Medal and Golden Kite Award for Middle Grade Fiction. The following year, Something Like Home earned a Pura Belpré Honor and was named a Notable Children's Book by the Association for Library Service to Children. In 2025, It's All or Nothing, Vale was named one of Booklist's top ten novels-in-verse and top ten sports books for youth.

== Publications ==
- Iveliz Explains It All. Illustrated by Alyssa Bermudez. Random. 2022. ISBN 978-0-593-56397-7.
- Something Like Home. Random. 2023. ISBN 978-0-593-56618-3.
- It's All or Nothing, Vale. Random. 2025. ISBN 978-0-593-81092-7.
- No Place on Earth. Random. 2026. ISBN 979-8-217-11943-1.
