= Simon James Green =

English author, screenwriter and director (born 1984/1985)

- Born: 1984/1985; Nottingham, England
- Education: Queens' College, Cambridge
- Occupation: Writer
- Writing career
- Genre: YA fiction
- Subject: LGBT
- Website: simonjamesgreen.com

Simon James Green (born 1984/1985) is an English author, screenwriter and director. He is best known for his comedic novels in the LGBT Young Adult genre.

== Early life and education ==
Green was born in Nottingham and grew up in Market Rasen, Lincolnshire. He wrote his first story on his grandmother's typewriter, aged 12. He studied law at Queens' College, Cambridge.

== Career ==
Green worked as a director in the West End and on tour, involved in shows including The Rocky Horror Show, West Side Story, End of the Rainbow and Blues Brothers. He also worked in television, directing Hollyoaks.

Green wrote a feature-length musical romcom for the BBC called Rules of Love.

In 2017 his first Young Adult novel Noah Can't Even was published by Scholastic. The book follows the adventures of an awkward gay teenager and it was written intentionally to "be funny" and "for British schoolkids to have their British experience reflected in books". This was followed by its sequel, Noah Could Never, in 2018.

Green's 2019 YA novel Alex in Wonderland is about a teenager who gets a job working at a run-down arcade in a seaside town and was nominated for the Carnegie Medal in 2020 and featured in The Guardian's 2019 Top 100 Holiday Reads. It was also named one of Attitude Magazine's "20 best LGBTQ reads of 2019".

In 2020 Green released his fourth YA novel, Heartbreak Boys, which follows two teenage boys who fake a relationship in order to simultaneously get back to their exes. The book was named one of Gay's the Word booksellers' Best Books of the Year.

Green's 2022 YA novel Gay Club! about a school's contentious LGBTQ+ Society election, received a Kirkus Starred Review.

In 2023 Green's YA novel Boy Like Me was released. Set in 1994 the protagonist is aided by a school librarian in discovering his sexuality, despite the active Section 28 law that said local authorities "shall not intentionally promote homosexuality or publish material with the intention of promoting homosexuality" or "promote the teaching in any maintained school of the acceptability of homosexuality as a pretended family relationship". The book was motivated in part by his cancelled school visit to a Catholic school in 2022.

Green branched out from YA fiction into middle-grade and picture book formats in 2020. He worked his first picture book with illustrator Garry Parsons on Llama Glamarama and his debut middle grade novel was Life of Riley: Beginner's Luck. In 2024 Green collaborated with Olympic diver Tom Daley on Daley's first middle grade book, Jack Splash.

Other awards for which Green has been nominated include the Branford Boase Award (Noah Can't Even) and was a finalist for the Blue Peter Book Award (Life of Riley). He won the Bristol Teen Book Award in 2021 for You're The One That I Want.

== Personal life ==
Green lives in South London with his dogs, Beau, Dolly, and Betty. He enjoys cooking. The author is openly gay.

== Works ==
=== Young Adult ===
- Noah Can't Even (2017)
- Noah Could Never (2018)
- Alex in Wonderland (2019)
- Heartbreak Boys (2020)
- You're The One That I Want (2021)
- Gay Club! (2022)
- Boy Like Me (2024)
- The Big Ask (2024)

=== Middle Grade ===
- Life of Riley: Beginner's Luck (2020)
- Sleep-Over Take-Over (2022)
- Finn Jones Was Here (2023)
- The Double Life of Ted Amos (2024)
- Jack Splash (2024) (collaboration with Olympic diver Tom Daley)

=== Picture Books ===
- Llama Glamarama (2020)
- Fabulous Frankie (2021)
