= American Library Association Rainbow Book List =

Annual list of youth books with LGBT content

The ALA Rainbow Book List is an annual list of "books with significant gay, lesbian, bisexual, or transgender content, and which are aimed at youth, birth through age 18" produced by the American Library Association's (ALA's) Rainbow Project, which is run by the ALA's Rainbow Round Table and Social Responsibilities Round Table.

== History ==
When the Gay Liberation Task Force formed in 1970 as part of the Social Responsibilities Round Table of the ALA, it was the first professional organization in the U.S. for gay people. In response to a lack of positive representation of gay people in literature, they created the Stonewall Book Award in 1971 and a bibliography of 48 gay books, freely requestable by mail. The task force later created other bibliographies concerning LGBTQ literature and adjusted their initial list over time. The group eventually became known as the Rainbow Round Table.

The Rainbow Book List evolved from these bibliographies. It began in 2008, as a joint endeavor between the Rainbow Round Table and the Social Responsibilities Round Table. Its goal is to recommend a bibliography of books with "significant and authentic LGBTQIA+ content" for readers up to 18 years old. The Rainbow Book List inspired a new list for readers over 18, the Over the Rainbow Book List. It was proposed in 2010 and the first list began in 2011, with a focus on providing a cross-section of each year's new high-quality LGBTQIA+ literature.

== LGBTQ bibliographies for libraries ==
Although roughly 4.5 percent of the U.S. population identifies as LGBT, "the vast majority of libraries lack high-quality, comprehensive LGBT collections" and "satisfaction among LGBT patrons is low." To ensure libraries have adequate LGBT books for readers of all ages, librarians should rely on resources such as the ALA's Rainbow List and the Lambda Literary Foundation. Library Journal recommends stocking the winners and finalists of LGBTQ literary awards, like the above or the ALA's Stonewall Book Awards, Publishing Triangle's awards, and Gaylactic Spectrum Awards. They also recommend adding books sold in LGBT bookstores or from LGBT-focused publishers. To make it easier and safer to check out these books, they recommend creating guides to find LGBT books without requiring the help of a librarian, like by creating book displays and lists.

== Honorees ==
Top Choices Per Year
| Year | Category | Title | Contributors |
|---|---|---|---|
| 2008 | Young Adult Fiction | Someday This Pain Will Be Useful to You | Peter Cameron |
| 2008 | Young Adult Fiction | grl2grl | Julie Anne Peters |
| 2008 | Young Adult Fiction | Freak Show | James St. James |
| 2008 | Young Adult Fiction | Breathing Underwater | Lu Vickers |
| 2009 | Picture Books | 10,000 Dresses | Marcus Ewert |
| 2009 | Young Adult Fiction | Down to the Bone | Mayra Lazara Dole |
| 2009 | Young Adult Fiction | Last Exit to Normal | Michael Harmon |
| 2009 | Young Adult Fiction | Skim | Mariko Tamaki and Jillian Tamaki |
| 2010 | Picture Books | Daddy, Papa, and Me | Lesléa Newman |
| 2010 | Fiction | How Beautiful the Ordinary | Michael Cart (ed.) |
| 2010 | Fiction | Ash | Malinda Lo |
| 2010 | Fiction | Into the Beautiful North | Luis Alberto Urrea |
| 2011 | Picture Books | Dogs Don't Do Ballet | Anna Kemp |
| 2011 | Juvenile Fiction | The Accidental Adventures of India McAllister | Charlotte Agell |
| 2011 | Juvenile Fiction | The Popularity Papers: Research for the Social Improvement and General Betterment of Lydia Goldblatt and Julie Graham-Chang | Amy Ignatow |
| 2011 | Juvenile Fiction | The Death-Defying Pepper Roux | Geraldine McCaughrean |
| 2011 | Young Adult/Crossover Fiction | Wildthorn | Jane Eagland |
| 2011 | Young Adult/Crossover Fiction | Will Grayson, Will Grayson | John Green and David Levithan |
| 2011 | Young Adult/Crossover Fiction | A Love Story Starring My Dead Best Friend | Emily Horner |
| 2011 | Young Adult/Crossover Nonfiction | Kicked Out | Sassafras Lowrey |
| 2011 | Young Adult/Crossover Nonfiction | Don't Ask. Don't Tell | Jeff Sheng |
| 2011 | Young Adult/Crossover Nonfiction | The Gallup's Modern Guide to Gay, Lesbian & Transgender Life (Series, 15 titles) | Various |
| 2012 | Picture Books | Donovan's Big Day | Leslea Newman with Mike Dutton (Illus.) |
| 2012 | Middle Grade/Early Young Adult Fiction | Huntress | Malinda Lo |
| 2012 | Middle Grade/Early Young Adult Fiction | Putting Makeup on the Fat Boy | Bil Wright |
| 2012 | Young Adult Fiction | I Am J | Cris Beam |
| 2012 | Young Adult Fiction | Beauty Queens | Libba Bray |
| 2012 | Young Adult Fiction | Brooklyn Burning | Steve Brezenoff |
| 2012 | Young Adult Fiction | Sister Mischief | Laura Goode |
| 2012 | Young Adult Fiction | Shine | Lauren Myracle |
| 2012 | Young Adult Fiction | She Loves You. She Loves You Not | Julie Anne Peters |
| 2012 | Young Adult Fiction | Gemini Bites | Patrick Ryan |
| 2013 | Middle/Early Young Adult Fiction | Beautiful Music for Ugly Children | Kirstin Cronn-Mills |
| 2013 | Middle/Early Young Adult Fiction | Drama | Raina Telgemeier |
| 2013 | Middle/Early Young Adult Nonfiction | The Letter Q: Queer Writers Notes to Their Younger Selves | Sarah Moon (Ed.) |
| 2013 | Young Adult/Crossover Fiction | Starting From Here | Lisa Jenn Bigelow |
| 2013 | Young Adult/Crossover Fiction | The Miseducation of Cameron Post | Emily M. Danforth |
| 2013 | Young Adult/Crossover Fiction | Ask the Passengers | A. S. King |
| 2013 | Young Adult/Crossover Fiction | Adaptation | Malinda Lo |
| 2013 | Young Adult/Crossover Fiction | The Song of Achilles | Madeline Miller |
| 2013 | Young Adult/Crossover Fiction | Chulito: a Novel | Charles Rice-González |
| 2013 | Young Adult/Crossover Fiction | Aristotle and Dante Discover the Secrets of the Universe | Benjamin Alire Saenz |
| 2014 | Juvenile Fiction | Better Nate than Ever | Tim Federle |
| 2014 | Teen Nonfiction | My New Gender Workbook: A Step-by-Step Guide to Achieving World Peace Through Gender Anarchy and Sex Positivity | Kate Bornstein |
| 2014 | Teen Nonfiction | Branded by the Pink Triangle | Ken Setterington |
| 2014 | Teen Fiction | Love in the Time of Global Warming | Francesca Lia Block |
| 2014 | Teen Fiction | Freakboy | Kristin Elizabeth Clark |
| 2014 | Teen Fiction | The Culling | Steven Dos Santos |
| 2014 | Teen Fiction | Leap | Z Egloff |
| 2014 | Teen Fiction | If You Could Be Mine | Sara Farizan |
| 2014 | Teen Fiction | The Summer Prince | Alaya Dawn Johnson |
| 2014 | Teen Fiction | Pantomime | Laura Lam |
| 2015 | Picture Books | Not Every Princess | Jeffrey Bone and Lisa Bone |
| 2015 | Picture Books | This Day in June | Gayle E. Pitman with Kristyna Litten (Illus.) |
| 2015 | Young Adult Fiction | Cinnamon Toast and the End of the World | Janet E. Cameron |
| 2015 | Young Adult Fiction | Tell Me Again How a Crush Should Feel | Sara Farizan |
| 2015 | Young Adult Fiction | I'll Give You the Sun | Jandy Nelson |
| 2015 | Young Adult Fiction | Far from You | Tess Sharpe |
| 2015 | Young Adult Fiction | Grasshopper Jungle | Andrew Smith |
| 2015 | Young Adult Fiction | Secret City | Julia Watts |
| 2015 | Young Adult Nonfiction | Sweet Tooth | Tim Anderson |
| 2015 | Young Adult Nonfiction | We Are the Youth: Sharing the Stories of LGBT Youth in the United States | Laurel Golio and Diana Scholl |
| 2016 | Graphic Novels | SuperMutant Magic Academy | Jillian Tamaki |
| 2016 | Juvenile Fiction | Gracefully Grayson | Ami Polonsky |
| 2016 | Juvenile Fiction | The Marvels | Brian Selznick |
| 2016 | Juvenile Nonfiction | Sex is a Funny Word: A Book about Bodies, Feelings, and YOU | Cory Silverberg with Fiona Smyth (Illus.) |
| 2016 | Young Adult Fiction | Simon vs. the Homo Sapiens Agenda | Becky Albertalli |
| 2016 | Young Adult Fiction | Cut Both Ways | Carrie Mesrobian |
| 2016 | Young Adult Fiction | When Everything Feels Like the Movies | Raziel Reid |
| 2016 | Young Adult Fiction | Fans of the Impossible Life | Kate Scelsa |
| 2016 | Young Adult Fiction | Forgive Me If I've Told You This Before | Karelia Stetz-Waters |
| 2016 | Young Adult Nonfiction | Breakthrough | Jack Andraka with Matthew Lysiak |
| 2017 | Graphic Novels | Princess Princess Ever After | Kay O'Neill |
| 2017 | Picture Books | I'm a Girl | Yasmeen Ismail |
| 2017 | Picture Books | Introducing Teddy: A Gentle Story About Gender and Friendship | Jessica Walton |
| 2017 | Young Adult Fiction | How Many Letters are in Goodbye? | Yvonne Cassidy |
| 2017 | Young Adult Fiction | We Are the Ants | Shaun David Hutchinson |
| 2017 | Young Adult Fiction | Every Heart a Doorway | Seanan McGuire |
| 2017 | Young Adult Fiction | When the Moon Was Ours | Anna-Marie McLemore |
| 2017 | Young Adult Fiction | This Song Is (Not) for You | Laura Nowlin |
| 2017 | Young Adult Fiction | The Root | Na’amen Gobert Tilahun |
| 2017 | Young Adult Fiction | And I Darken | Kiersten White |
| 2018 | Board Books | Baby's First Words | Stella Blackstone and Sunny Scribens with Christiane Engel (Illus.) |
| 2018 | Middle Grade Fiction | Felix Yz | Lisa Bunker |
| 2018 | Middle Grade Fiction | Star-Crossed | Barbara Dee |
| 2018 | Young Adult Nonfiction | The ABCs of LGBT+ | Ash Hardell (Note: Credited as Ashely Mardell; The ABCs of LGBT+ was released before Hardell came out as transgender and married their spouse.) |
| 2018 | Young Adult Nonfiction | The 57 Bus | Dashka Slater |
| 2018 | Young Adult Fiction | We Are Okay | Nina LaCour |
| 2018 | Young Adult Fiction | Ramona Blue | Julie Murphy |
| 2018 | Young Adult Fiction | They Both Die at the End | Adam Silvera |
| 2018 | Young Adult Fiction | Dress Codes for Small Towns | Courtney Stevens |
| 2018 | Young Adult Fiction | The Backstagers Vol. 1 | James Tynion IV and Rian Sygh |
| 2019 | Picture Books Fiction | Prince & Knight | Daniel Haack and Stevie Lewis |
| 2019 | Picture Books Fiction | Sewing the Rainbow | Gayle E. Pitman |
| 2019 | Middle Grade Fiction | Hurricane Child | Kacen Callender |
| 2019 | Young Adult Fiction | Girl Made of Stars | Ashley Herring Blake |
| 2019 | Young Adult Fiction | Let's Talk About Love | Claire Kann |
| 2019 | Young Adult Fiction | Darius the Great Is Not Okay | Adib Khorram |
| 2019 | Young Adult Fiction | Girls of Paper and Fire | Natasha Ngan |
| 2019 | Young Adult Fiction | Jack of Hearts (and Other Parts) | Lev A. C. Rosen |
| 2019 | Young Adult Fiction | Odd One Out | Nic Stone |
| 2019 | Young Adult Fiction | DeadEndia: The Watcher's Test | Hamish Steele |
| 2020 | Picture Books Nonfiction | Stonewall: A Building. An Uprising. A Revolution. | Rob Sanders and Jamey Christoph |
| 2020 | Picture Books Fiction | When Aidan Became a Brother | Kyle Lukoff and Kaylani Juanita |
| 2020 | Picture Books Fiction | A Plan for Pops | Heather Smith and Brooke Kerrigan |
| 2020 | Young Adult Nonfiction | Brave Face | Shaun David Hutchinson |
| 2020 | Young Adult Fiction | Pet | Akwaeke Emezi |
| 2020 | Young Adult Fiction | The Love & Lies of Rukhsana Ali | Sabina Khan |
| 2020 | Young Adult Fiction | The Music of What Happens | Bill Konigsberg |
| 2020 | Young Adult Fiction | We Set the Dark on Fire | Tehlor Kay Mejia |
| 2020 | Young Adult Fiction | On a Sunbeam | Tillie Walden |
| 2020 | Young Adult Fiction | Mooncakes | Suzanne Walker and Wendy Xu |
| 2021 | Early Readers Nonfiction | Drawing on Walls: A Story of Keith Haring | Matthew Burgess and Josh Cochran (Illus.) |
| 2021 | Early Readers Nonfiction | Our Subway Baby | Peter Mercurio and Leo Espinosa (Illus.) |
| 2021 | Juvenile Fiction | My Rainbow | DeShanna Neal, Trinity Neal, and Art Twink (Illus.) |
| 2021 | Juvenile Fiction | My Maddy | Gayle E. Pitman and Violet Tobacco (Illus.) |
| 2021 | Juvenile Fiction | The Every Body Book: LGBTQ+ Inclusive Guide for Kids about Sex, Gender, Bodies, and Families | Rachel Simon and Noah Grigni (Illus.) |
| 2021 | Middle Grade Fiction | King and the Dragonflies | Kacen Callender |
| 2021 | Middle Grade Fiction | Ana on the Edge | A. J. Sass |
| 2021 | Young Adult Nonfiction | All Boys Aren't Blue: A Memoir-Manifesto | George Matthew Johnson |
| 2021 | Young Adult Fiction | Circus Rose | Betsy Cornwell |
| 2021 | Young Adult Fiction | When We Were Magic | Sarah Gailey |
| 2021 | Young Adult Fiction | You Should See Me in a Crown | Leah Johnson |
| 2021 | Young Adult Fiction | I'll Be the One | Lyla Lee |
| 2021 | Young Adult Fiction | Elatsoe | Darcie Little Badger and Rovina Cai (Illus.) |
| 2021 | Young Adult Fiction | Miss Meteor | Tehlor Kay Mejia and Anna-Marie McLemore |
| 2021 | Young Adult Fiction | War Girls | Tochi Onyebuchi |
| 2021 | Young Adult Fiction | Camp | Lev A. C. Rosen |
| 2021 | Young Adult Fiction | Cemetery Boys | Aiden Thomas |
| 2021 | Young Adult Fiction | Snapdragon | Kat Leyh |
| 2021 | Young Adult Fiction | The Magic Fish | Trung Le Nguyen |
| 2021 | Young Adult Fiction | The Deep & Dark Blue | Niki Smith |
| 2022 | Picture Books Fiction | Bodies Are Cool | Tyler Feder |
| 2022 | Picture Books Fiction | Calvin | Vanessa Ford and JR |
| 2022 | Picture Books Fiction | Grandad's Camper | Harry Woodgate |
| 2022 | Picture Books Fiction | What Are Your Words: A Book About Pronouns | Katherine Locke |
| 2022 | Juvenile Fiction | Both Can Be True | Jules Machais |
| 2022 | Juvenile Fiction | The Deepest Breath | Meg Grehan |
| 2022 | Juvenile Fiction | Frankie & Bug | Gayle Forman |
| 2022 | Juvenile Fiction | Too Bright to See | Kyle Lukoff |
| 2022 | Middle Grade Fiction | The Insiders | Mark Oshiro |
| 2022 | Middle Grade Fiction | Thanks a Lot, Universe | Chad Lucas |
| 2022 | Young Adult Fiction | Ace of Spades | Faridah Àbíké-Íyímídé |
| 2022 | Young Adult Fiction | The Darkness Outside Us | Eliot Schrefer |
| 2022 | Young Adult Fiction | Each of Us a Desert | Mark Oshiro |
| 2022 | Young Adult Fiction | Hani and Ishu's Guide to Fake Dating | Adiba Jaigirdar |
| 2022 | Young Adult Fiction | Last Night at the Telegraph | Malinda Lo |
| 2022 | Young Adult Fiction | Legendborn | Tracy Deonn |
| 2022 | Young Adult Fiction | The Passing Playbook | Isaac Fitzsimons |
| 2022 | Young Adult Fiction | This Poison Heart | Kalynn Bayron |
| 2022 | Graphic Fiction | The Girl from the Sea | Lee Knox Ostertag |
| 2022 | Manga | Boys Run the Riot, vol 1-3 | Keito Gaku |
| 2023 | Picture Books Fiction | Bathe the Cat | Alice B. McGinty and David Roberts (illus.) |
| 2023 | Picture Books Fiction | Mama and Mommy and Me in the Middle | Nina LaCour and Kaylani Juanita (illus.) |
| 2023 | Picture Books Nonfiction | A Song for the Unsung: Bayard Rustin, the Man Behind the 1963 March on Washington | Carole Boston Weatherford, Rob Sanders, and Byron McCray |
| 2023 | Upper Elementary Fiction | Moonflower | Kacen Callender |
| 2023 | Upper Elementary Fiction | The Civil War of Amos Abernathy | Michael Leali |
| 2023 | Upper Elementary Fiction | Tiger Honor | Yoon Lee |
| 2023 | Upper Elementary Fiction | You Only Live Once, David Bravo | Mark Oshiro |
| 2023 | Upper Elementary Fiction | Ellen Outside the Lines | A.J. Sass |
| 2023 | Middle School Fiction | Different Kinds of Fruit | Kyle Lukoff |
| 2023 | Middle School Graphic Fiction | Artie and the Wolf Moon | Olivia Stephens |
| 2023 | Young Adult Nonfiction | Queer Ducks (and Other Animals): The Natural World of Animal Sexuality | Eliot Schrefer and Jules Zuckerberg (illus.) |
| 2023 | Young Adult Fiction | The Summer of Bitter and Sweet | Jen Ferguson |
| 2023 | Young Adult Fiction | The Honeys | Ryan La Sala |
| 2023 | Young Adult Fiction | The Many Half-Lived Lives of Sam Sylvester | Maya MacGregor |
| 2023 | Young Adult Fiction | Loveless | Alice Oseman |
| 2023 | Young Adult Fiction | The City Beautiful | Aden Polydoros |
| 2023 | Young Adult Fiction | Just Ash | Sol Santana |
| 2023 | Young Adult Fiction | When You Call My Name | Tucker Shaw |
| 2023 | Young Adult Fiction | The Sunbearer Trials | Aiden Thomas |
| 2023 | Young Adult Novel in Verse Fiction | Nothing Burns as Bright as You | Ashley Woodfolk |
| 2024 | Picture Books Fiction | My Mommies Built a Treehouse | Gareth Peter and Izzy Evans (illus.) |
| 2024 | Picture Books Fiction | Grandad's Pride | Harry Woodgate |
| 2024 | Upper Elementary Nonfiction | A Child's Introduction to Pride: The Inspirational History and Culture of LGBTQIA+ Community | Sarah Prager and Caitlin O'Dwyer (illus.) |
| 2024 | Upper Elementary Fiction | Ellie Engle Saves Herself | Leah Johnson |
| 2024 | Upper Elementary Fiction | Camp QUILTBAG | Nicole Melleby and A.J. Sass |
| 2024 | Upper Elementary Fiction | Nikhil Out Loud | Maulik Pancholy |
| 2024 | Upper Elementary Fiction | Jude Saves the World | Ronnie Riley |
| 2024 | Upper Elementary Fiction | Joy to the World | Kai Shappley and Lisa Bunker |
| 2024 | Upper Elementary Fiction | Sir Callie and the Champions of Helston | Esme Symes-Smith |
| 2024 | Upper Elementary Fiction | The Year My Life Went Down the Toilet | Jake Maia Arlow |
| 2024 | Young Adult Fiction | The Long Run | James Acker |
| 2024 | Young Adult Fiction | Imogen, Obviously | Becky Albertalli |
| 2024 | Young Adult Fiction | Ander & Santi Were Here: a Novel | Jonny Garza Villa |
| 2024 | Young Adult Fiction | We Deserve Monuments | Jas Hammonds |
| 2024 | Young Adult Fiction | Self-Made Boys: A Great Gatsby Remix | Anna-Marie McLemore |
| 2024 | Young Adult Fiction | Beating Heart Baby | Lio Min |
| 2024 | Young Adult Fiction | The Wicked Bargain | Gabe Cole Novoa |
| 2024 | Young Adult Fiction | She Is a Haunting | Trang Thanh Tran |
| 2024 | Young Adult Graphic Fiction | Northranger | Rey Terciero and Bre Indigo (illus.) |
| 2024 | Young Adult Manga Fiction | Is Love the Answer? | Uta Isaki |
| 2025 | Picture Books Fiction | Marley's Pride | Joëlle Retener and DeAnn Wiley (illus.) |
| 2025 | Picture Books Fiction | How Are You, Verity? | Meghan Wilson Duff and Taylor Barron (illus.) |
| 2025 | Picture Books Nonfiction | Jimmy's Rhythm & Blues: The Extraordinary Life of James Baldwin | Michelle Meadows and Jamiel Law (illus.) |
| 2025 | Upper Elementary Fiction | The Curse of Eelgrass Bog | Mary Averling |
| 2025 | Upper Elementary Fiction | Noah Frye Gets Crushed | Maggie Horne |
| 2025 | Upper Elementary Fiction | Linus and Etta Could Use a Win | Caroline Huntoon |
| 2025 | Upper Elementary Fiction | Murray Out of Water | Taylor Tracy |
| 2025 | Upper Elementary Fiction | Just Lizzie | Karen Wilfrid |
| 2025 | Upper Elementary Fiction | Lunar Boy | Jes Wibowo and Cin Wibowo |
| 2025 | Young Adult Fiction | Icarus | K. Ancrum |
| 2025 | Young Adult Fiction | Kindling | Traci Chee |
| 2025 | Young Adult Fiction | Ariel Crashes a Train | Olivia A. Cole |
| 2025 | Young Adult Fiction | Rana Joon and the One and Only Now | Shideh Etaat |
| 2025 | Young Adult Fiction | Canto Contigo | Jonny Garza Villa |
| 2025 | Young Adult Fiction | Flyboy | Kasey LeBlanc |
| 2025 | Young Adult Fiction | The Borrow a Boyfriend Club | Page Powars |
| 2025 | Young Adult Fiction | Dear Wendy | Ann Zhao |
| 2025 | Young Adult Nonfiction | How the Boogeyman Became a Poet | Tony Keith Jr. |
| 2025 | Young Adult Graphic Novel Nonfiction | Breathe: Journeys to Healthy Binding | Maia Kobabe and Dr. Sarah Peitzmeier |
| 2026 | Picture Book- Fiction | Menudo Sunday: A Spanglish Counting Book | María Dolores Águila and Erika Meza |
| 2026 | Picture Book- Fiction | The Gathering Table | Antwan Eady and London Ladd |
| 2026 | Picture Book - Non-Fiction | My Little Golden Book About Pride | Kyle Lukoff and Michelle Jing Chang |
| 2026 | Picture Book - Non-Fiction | Outside in and Inside Out: A Story About Arnold Lobel | Emmy Kastner |
| 2026 | Upper Elementary Fiction | Witchycakes #1: Sweet Magic and Witchycakes #2: Changing Magic | Kara LaReau and Ariane Moreira |
| 2026 | Upper Elementary Fiction | The Flicker | H. E. Edgmon |
| 2026 | Upper Elementary Fiction | Ice Apprentices | Jacob North |
| 2026 | Upper Elementary Fiction | Glitch Girl! | Rainie Oet |
| 2026 | Upper Elementary Fiction | Tales from Beyond the Rainbow: Ten LGBTQ+ Fairy Tales Proudly Reclaimed | Pete Jordi Wood |
| 2026 | Young Adult - Fiction | Ollie In Between | Jess Callans |
| 2026 | Young Adult - Fiction | Under the Same Stars | Libba Bray |
| 2026 | Young Adult - Fiction | The Good Vampire's Guide to Blood and Boyfriends | Jamie D'Amato |
| 2026 | Young Adult - Fiction | Thanks for Listening | Molly Horan |
| 2026 | Young Adult - Fiction | These Vengeful Gods | Gabe Cole Novoa |
| 2026 | Young Adult - Fiction | Come Home to My Heart | Riley Redgate |
| 2026 | Young Adult - Fiction | Compound Fracture | Andrew Joseph White |
| 2026 | Young Adult - Fiction | I Shall Never Fall in Love | Hari Conner |
| 2026 | Young Adult - Fiction | Leaving Room | Amber McBride |
| 2026 | Young Adult - Non-fiction | Trans History: A Graphic Novel: From Ancient Times to the Present Day | Alex L. Combs and Andrew Eakett |
| 2026 | Young Adult - Non-fiction | Hick: The Trailblazing Journalist Who Captured Eleanor Roosevelt's Heart | Sarah Miller |

== See also ==
- Stonewall Awards
