= LGBTQ+ Athletes Claim the Field =

2016 book by Kirstin Cronn-Mills

LGBTQ+ Athletes Claim the Field: Striving for Equality
- Author: Kirstin Cronn-Mills
- Language: English
- Subject: Gay athletes, Transgender athletes
- Genre: Nonfiction
- Publisher: Twenty-First Century Books
- Publication date: August 1, 2016
- Publication place: United States
- Media type: Print
- Pages: 104
- ISBN: 9781467780124
- Dewey Decimal: 796.086/64

LGBTQ+ Athletes Claim the Field: Striving for Equality, written by Kirstin Cronn-Mills and published August 1, 2016 by Twenty-First Century Books, is a nonfiction book about queer athletes and how their status has changed—and still needs to change.

== Reception ==
LGBTQ+ Athletes Claim the Field received a starred review from Booklist, who highlighted how, Cronn-Mills "humanizes" homophobic and transphobic prejudice and discrimination "with her numerous profiles of LGBTQ+ athletes. Though succinct ..., hers is an important contribution to the blossoming field of LGBTQ+ literature."

Kirkus Reviews indicated that the book has "high appeal for both athletes and those who support LGBTQ rights" and that Cronn-Mills uses "clear, readable text" to discuss the prejudices against LGBT+ athletes. School Library Journal recommended the book for "libraries with strong interest in sports history or LGBTQIA topics" and wrote, "While all of the stories of these athletes are individually compelling, a few organizational stumbles interrupt the flow. The connections between sidebars and the larger text are not always clear and can often be quite tenuous." They further highlighted that "the detailed time line in the back matter ... effectively communicates a narrative of major events and progress over time. Crisp color photographs, usually of athletes on or off the field, enhance the text throughout and visually reinforce the message that athletics are for everyone."

LGBTQ+ Athletes Claim the Field is a Junior Library Guild book.

Accolades for LGBTQ+ Athletes Claim the Field
Year	Accolade	Result	Ref.
2017	American Library Association Rainbow List	Selection	
2017	Young Adult Library Services Association's Quick Picks for Reluctant Young Adult Readers	Nominee	
2017	Minnesota Book Award for Young Adult Literature	Finalist	
2017	Booklist's Books for Youth: Diverse Young Adult Nonfiction	Top Ten	
