= We Are the Youth =

We Are the Youth may refer to:

- We Are the Youth (art project), an American LGBT youth photography project
- "We Are the Youth" (song), a 2021 single by Jack River

== See also ==
- "We Are the Young", a 1984 song by Dan Hartman
