= Survivor's Guilt (disambiguation) =

Survivor's Guilt is a mental condition that affects people who survived an event where others died.

Survivor's Guilt or Survivors Guilt may also refer to:

== Music ==
- Survivors Guilt: The Mixtape, a 2021 mixtape by KennyHoopla and Travis Barker
- Survivor's Guilt (album), a 2022 album by Mozzy
- Survivor's Guilt, an album by Merkules
- "Survivor's Guilt", a song by Haley Blais from Wisecrack
- "Survivor's Guilt", a song by Dave from We're All Alone in This Together
- "Survivor's Guilt", a song by Saba from Few Good Things
- "Survivor's Guilt", a song by Underoath from The Place After This One
- "Survivor's Guilt", a song by Gigi Perez from At the Beach, in Every Life
- "Survivor's Guilt", a song by Alexisonfire from Otherness
- "Pray Everyday (Survivor's Guilt)", a song by GoldLink from At What Cost
- "Survivors Guilt", a song by Joey Badass from 2000

== Other uses ==
- "Survivor's Guilt" (Law & Order: UK), a television episode
- Survivor's Guilt, a film directed by Caleb Femi
- Survivor's Guilt, a novel by Robyn Gigl
