= Our Subway Baby =

2020 picture book

- Author: Peter Mercurio
- Illustrators: Leo Espinosa
- Language: English
- Subject: LGBT adoption
- Genre: Children's literature, Memoir
- Publisher: Dial Press
- Publication date: September 15, 2020
- Publication place: United States
- Media type: Print
- Pages: 40
- ISBN: 9780525427544
- OCLC: 1132238174

Our Subway Baby is a picture book written by Peter Mercurio, illustrated by Leo Espinosa, and published September 15, 2020 by Dial Press. The book tells the true story of how Pete and his husband, Danny, found and eventually adopted their son, Kevin.

== Background ==
Based on a true story, Our Subway Baby illustrates how author Peter Mercurio and his husband Danny Stewart saved an infant child in New York City’s Union Square Subway station. At the station, Danny Stewart momentarily glanced at the floor and saw what he initially believed was a baby doll wrapped in a sweatshirt. However, he soon realized the baby was a living infant and promptly called 911. After retrieving the child, the authorities named him Daniel “ACE” Doe in honor of Stewart and the A/C/E subway line. The discovery occurred in August 2000 and the baby was later adopted in December 2002. Mercurio is a New York-based author who, in addition to writing this book, has also written a handful of plays, as well as founded Other Side Productions, a nonprofit theatre company. As of 2020, Mercurio's son Kevin is 20 years old and a math and computer science major in college.

== Style ==
The book contains digital mixed media art illustrations throughout, and also includes pictures of the author, his partner, and their son many years after the events depicted in the book.

== Summary ==
The book follows the two fathers as they navigate the court system in their journey to adopt Kevin. The narrative covers their initial discovery of the baby in the subway, their contact with authorities, and the finalization of the adoption process. The book illuminates the importance of family support as their extended families come together to help the new fathers.

== Analysis ==
Kirkus Reviews claims that this book appeals to young audiences as it discusses financial difficulties in terms of “piggy banks,” which helps children make more sense of these problems. Peter mentions that he and Danny had “empty” piggy banks and lived in a small NYC apartment. Kirkus Reviews also applauds the illustrator, Leo Espinosa, for correctly portraying the characters' races: Peter and Danny are white men, and their child, Kevin, has light brown skin.

== Reception ==
Our Subway Baby received positive reviews from Kirkus, who called the book "[a] delightful story of love and hope," School Library Journal, and the American Library Association (ALA).

The book is a Junior Library Guild selection and received the following accolades:

- American Library Association's Rainbow List top ten (2021)
- Lambda Literary Award for Children's and Young Adult Literature finalist (2021)
- ALA Reference and User Services Association (RUSA) included Our Subway Baby in their top-25 list of books.
- September's Most Anticipated LGBTQ Books from the Lambda Literary Review (2020)
