= Mary Averling =

British-Canadian novelist

- Mary Averling at Queen's University, 2024
- Born: 1998 (age 27–28); Huntingdon, United Kingdom
- Education: University of Victoria (BA) Lucy Cavendish College, Cambridge (MPhil) Queen's University at Kingston (PhD)
- Occupation: Novelist
- Notable work: The Curse of Eelgrass Bog

Mary Averling (born 1998) is a British-Canadian children's novelist and academic, best known for her Bram Stoker Award-nominated debut, The Curse of Eelgrass Bog.

== Biography ==
Mary was born in Cambridgeshire and moved frequently as a child, living in Wiltshire, Ontario, and British Columbia before studying her BA in English and Creative Writing at the University of Victoria. She returned to England for her master's degree, which she completed at the University of Cambridge during the height of the COVID-19 pandemic. While at Cambridge, Mary started writing The Curse of Eelgrass Bog and won Lucy Cavendish College, Cambridge's Florence Staniforth Fiction Prize. She received her doctorate from Queen's University at Kingston and is currently an English lecturer at Thompson Rivers University. Her research focuses on horror, Victorian fiction, ecocriticsm, and girlhood, with articles published by Brill Publishers, Routledge, and Peter Lang (publisher).

== Career ==
Mary is signed with the Andrea Brown Literary Agency. The Curse of Eelgrass Bog sold at auction to G. P. Putnam's Sons children's imprint, and became a Junior Library Guild Gold Standard Selection, a Target Book Club Pick, an Amazon Editors Pick, and an honoree on the American Library Association Rainbow Book List. It received a starred review from BookPage and was chosen as one of the publication's Best Books of 2024. The novel follows 12-year old Kess Pedrock and her sidekick, Shrunken Jim, as they search a witch-haunted bog for artifacts to save her family's Unnatural History Museum.

Mary's second novel, The Ghosts of Bitterfly Bay, released from Putnam in 2025. It was a finalist in the Manitoba Young Readers Choice Awards and is currently a 2027 Forest of Reading Silver Birch Award nominee. A third novel, The Burn Beast, released in September 2026 and was named one of New York Public Library and Chicago Public Library's Best Books of 2026. In a starred review, Kirkus Reviews called it "A quintessential thriller that burns like wildfire."

== Personal life ==
Mary lives in Kamloops, British Columbia.

== Publications ==
- The Curse of Eelgrass Bog (2024)
- The Ghosts of Bitterfly Bay (2025)
- The Burn Beast (2026)
