= Ash Hardell =

American YouTuber and activist

- Occupations: Author; YouTube personality; vlogger

YouTube information
- Channels: Ash Hardell; More Ash and Gray
- Years active: 2009–present
- Subscribers: 738 thousand (combined)
- Views: 65.1 million (combined)
- Last updated: 13 April 2024
- Website: www.hardellmedia.com

Ash Hardell (born Mardell) is an American author and YouTuber. (Note: Hardell uses any and all pronouns. This article uses they/them for consistency.)

They focus on being a voice for the LGBTQIA+ community and creating education content about sexual and gender diversity.

== Career ==
=== YouTube ===
Hardell started video blogging in 2009. Their videos focus on their own experience in the LGBTQ+ community, as well as educational content on different identities and orientations of the gender, romantic and sexual spectrum.

In 2017, YouTube came under scrutiny for censoring LGBTQ content. After wide criticism, YouTube apologized for mistakes in their censorship of restricted mode that mistakenly censored LGBTQ content and mentioned Hardell's channel as one of the examples where their algorithm mistakenly classified their content as restricted.

In 2019, YouTube came under further scrutiny for their weak response to harassment of LGBTQ content creators. Hardell was quoted in The Guardian that they received little support from the company despite years of harassment. Hardell talked about hoping that YouTube revamps their harassment policy and more specifically lays out their rules.

Hardell took a break from posting videos at the end of 2019 and returned to posting content in 2022 after a two and a half-year break in their video titled Trauma. Transphobia. And the Internet. (why I left for 2.5 years) in which they talk about the extensive harassment they received from social media audiences as well as other transphobic content creators and their followers.

==== Second YouTube channel ====
They also sometimes post on their second YouTube channel titled More Ash and Gray that focuses on more personal content, alongside their partner Gray.

=== Book ===
Hardell published the book ABC's of LGBT+ in 2016, which has been widely cited for its in-depth definitions of LGBT+ terms. The book was a No. 1 best seller on Amazon. The book was based on a videos series of the same name that Hardell created on their YouTube channel in 2014.

In November 2017, they published a free accompaniment to the book, titled The GayBC's of LGBTQ+.

In 2022, Hardell published a Companion Guide to the book, titled ABCs of LGBT+ Guided Journal: A Companion Guide to Ash Hardell's The ABC's of LBGT (Teen & Young Adult Social Issues, LGBTQ+, Gender Expression).

== Media and events ==
- In February 2017, they appeared as guest star on the online radio show The Hannah Witton Show with British personality Hannah Witton.
- In June 2017, Hardell appeared as a guest on the Podcast Transmission with author and content creator Jackson Bird during an appearance at VidCon.
- In 2019, Hardell was a panelist at the 7th annual Buffer Festival in Toronto.

== Awards and recognitions ==
In 2017, Hardell was nominated for a Shorty Award in the LGBTQ+ YouTube Channel category.

The book "ABC's of LGBT+" was recognized in 2018 in the ALA Rainbow Book List in the Young Adult Nonfiction category.

== Bibliography ==
- The ABC's of LGBT+ (Mango Media, 2016, ISBN 9781633534094)

== Personal life ==
Hardell is originally from Minneapolis, Minnesota. They are non-binary, transgender, and pansexual. Hardell is married to their spouse Grayson Hardell.
