= Felix Ever After =

2020 novel by Kacen Callender

- Author: Kacen Callender
- Language: English
- Genre: Young adult novel
- Publisher: Balzer + Bray
- Publication date: May 12, 2020
- Publication place: United States
- Pages: 368
- ISBN: 978-0-06-282025-9

Felix Ever After is a young adult novel written by Kacen Callender and published in 2020 by Balzer + Bray. The story is narrated by a Black trans teen as he grapples "with identity and self-discovery while falling in love for the first time". Felix Ever After was a 2021 Stonewall Honor Book and one of Time's "100 Best YA Books of All Time".

== Summary ==
Felix Ever After follows Felix Love, a seventeen-year-old Black trans boy who attends the competitive Brooklyn art school, St. Catherine's, on a scholarship. He has been out for a few years and has queer friends, of various racial backgrounds and from very wealthy families. Felix's mom left when he was 10. His dad supports Felix's top surgery and hormone therapy but deadnames him.

Felix is a painter and creates acrylic portraits in the book. He hopes to get an art scholarship to Brown University and competes for the single spot with Declan, who is the ex of Felix's best friend, Ezra. Ezra begins to grow distant from Felix when dating Austin. Felix is a hopeless romantic but unsure if he'll find someone who loves him for himself, including his intersecting identities.

An anonymous student hacks into Felix's Instagram account and posts his pre-transition photos and dead name in the school's art gallery, followed by a barrage of transphobic messages. Felix deals with the trauma of these attacks, and he grapples with his identity, friendships, and relationship to love in their aftermath. He guesses Declan is behind them and seeks revenge by catfishing him on Instagram, while trying to determine whether Declan or someone else was responsible.

Felix's plan results in a love triangle when he learns more about Declan and his feelings for Felix. Felix also faces the prejudice of his ex Marisol, who says that Felix is anti-woman because he has transitioned. He faces transphobia from other people throughout the book as well, including from queer people who he thought were his friends. Eventually, Felix learns more about love, including how to love himself and face his fears around being worthy of love.

== Development ==
Callender said that they were inspired to write the book because of a lack of representation in books and other media of characters who shared their identity. They wanted to center a "Black, queer, trans masculine person who identifies as a demiboy." Callender wrote in the book's foreword that the first transgender character they saw in media, Adam from Degrassi: The Next Generation, changed their life, and they hoped protagonists like Felix could help other readers find representation.

Callender also wanted to represent a character that knew they were trans, but started to re-question their identity, because Callender found this was a common experience for many queer people. They wanted to make a trans story that was romantic and fun, rather than focused only on their gender identity. Finally, Callender wanted to emphasize that Black and brown queer people like Felix and themselves, are worthy of love.

In a 2020 interview, Callender was concerned by the lack of support for Black queer stories even as queer stories received more recognition and support. They said this neglect was a form of invisible racism that is easy to dismiss and hard to prove, and hoped that Felix Ever After and similar works could erode that prejudice so that more works and representation could follow.

== Reception ==
Time named Felix Ever After one of "The 100 Best YA Books of All Time" alongside Catcher in the Rye, The Outsiders, and others.

=== Reviews ===
The book was generally well-received, including starred reviews from Booklist, Publishers Weekly, and School Library Journal.

Booklist's Kaitlin Connor noted, "Felix's hard-fought and dramatic journey toward self-discovery will resonate with teens looking for narratives about diverse LGBTQIA characters learning to love themselves." Amanda MacGregor, writing for the School Library Journal, praised the book's diverse cast of characters and the protagonist MacGregor calls "achingly relatable". The Publishers Weekly said Callender created "an exhilarating cast of queer characters, many of whom are people of color, who are as relatable as they are realistic." The magazine also praised the whodunit plot and all its twists, concluding the review with an overall praise of the main character and the story.

Reviewing for The Horn Book, Luann Toth mentioned the "sound information and responsible psychological guidance" present in the novel without detracting from the overall experience. Shelf Awareness's Kieran Slattery, noted, "Callender ... adeptly weaves a poignant bildungsroman that builds suspense as, layer by layer, new dimensions of Felix's identity are unmasked with each failed attempt to identify his tormentor." Slattery continued, stating, "In a society where the lines between in-person and social media interactions blur, Callender believably captures this interconnectivity with teenagers whose identities are shaped, dismantled and reconfigured by their social media use."

Kirkus Reviews offered a negative review, calling it "an exhausting read" due to the complicated story and the "devastating episodes of self-doubt and anxiety" Felix goes through. The reviewer concluded Felix Ever After is a "trauma- and drama-filled demiboy's story that's not for the faint of heart."

==== Response to Kirkus review ====
Callender condemned the Kirkus review in a Medium post titled "re: Kirkus", calling it offensive and transphobic. Ray Stoeve, writing for Autostraddle, likewise described the review as transphobic. Rachel Charlene Lewis, interviewing Callender for Bitch, compared their frustrations towards reviewers who misunderstand trans identities with Mason Deaver's experiences with reader misgendering following I Wish You All the Best. She asked Callender what they would want readers to understand about trans characters and authors: they responded that the relevant issues were diverse, contrasting the ease of addressing misgendering with the layered transphobia of the Kirkus review.

=== Banning ===
In 2023, the book was challenged but kept at Old Rochester Regional High School. In 2024, the book was banned in Beaufort County, South Carolina.

=== Awards and honors ===
Year	Award/honor	Category	Result	Ref.
2020	Booklist Editors' Choice	Books for Youth	Selection	
2020	Goodreads Choice Award	Young Adult Fiction	Nominee	
2021	ALA Best Fiction for Young Adults	—	Top 10	
2021	Stonewall Book Award	Children's & Young Adult	Honor	
2021	YALSA Quick Picks for Reluctant Young Adult Readers	—	Selection	
