= Hick: The Trailblazing Journalist Who Captured Eleanor Roosevelt's Heart =

2025 non-fiction book by Sarah Miller

- Author: Sarah Miller
- Genre: Biography
- Publisher: Random House Studio
- Publication date: May 27, 2025
- Pages: 384
- ISBN: 9780593649091

Hick: The Trailblazing Journalist Who Captured Eleanor Roosevelt's Heart is a non-fiction book by Sarah Miller. It is a biography of Lorena "Hick" Hickok (1893–1968), an Associated Press reporter who had a deep and suspected romantic relationship with Eleanor Roosevelt.

== Development ==
Miller was inspired to write Hick after learning about arguments over the nature of Hickok's and Roosevelt's relationship. She read approximately 3500 historical letters Hickok and Roosevelt sent each other when preparing the book. She also desired to explore Hickok's life beyond her connection to Roosevelt.

Miller's account concludes that the women's relationship was romantic, while also emphasizing the importance of their friendship.

== Reception ==
Hick received starred reviews from School Library Journal and the Horn Book. The Horn Book noted how the book showed how Hick's abusive childhood affected her later in life, and how Miller directly addressed Hickok's queerness while simultaneously acknowledging the ambiguous elements of her and Roosevelt's relationship. The book was also reviewed Kirkus Reviews, which concluded that it was a "substantial biography of a noteworthy figure".

The book was included in the American Library Association Rainbow Book List's Non-fiction Top Ten of 2026, as well as School Library Journal's Best Non-fiction Middle to High School Books of 2025.
