= Lev A. C. Rosen =

American author

Lev A. C. Rosen, also known as L. C. Rosen, is an American author.

== Life and education ==
Rosen was raised in Manhattan, New York, where he lived with his husband as of June, 2020.

He attended a private high school and came out as gay when he was around 13 years old. In 2006, Rosen received a Master of Fine Arts degree in fiction from Sarah Lawrence College.

When he was younger, Rosen attended a Jewish summer camp in Connecticut for several years, the physical layout of which is represented in his novel Camp. Later, he was a counsellor at the camp. He tried to discuss his sexuality with the children, but was forbidden by superiors from doing so.

== Career ==
=== Jack of Hearts (2018) ===
'His book Jack of Hearts (and Other Parts) is a young adult novel published October 30, 2018 by Little, Brown Books for Young Readers. The book follows Jack, a gay teenager who is the center of gossip at his high school. After he starts writing an advice column in his friend's blog, he begins receiving messages from a stalker, making his life worse.

The book was generally well received by critics, with Gay Times saying it "might be the most important queer novel of the decade." Kirkus Reviews called the book a "sex-positive and thoughtful romp with humor and heart." Booklist referred to it as "[f]resh, sex-positive, and unabashedly entertaining." The Guardian wrote: "Part thriller, part down-to-earth guide, this is humane, sex-positive writing of the funniest, filthiest and most heartening kind." School Library Journal said the book is an “essential addition to library collections that serve teens."

Although the book wasn't explicitly banned in the United States, Rosen has stated it was "silent[ly] banned" because teachers, schools, and library did not place the book on shelves. On November 4, 2021, the book was removed from circulation from Texas's Keller Independent School District. On November 15, a parent from Texas's Katy Independent School District used the book as an example to highlight the "vulgarity" of books available in the district's libraries. The district removed Jack of Hearts from shelves the following day. Rosen has responded to the book challenges, saying the passages used to justify the bans were taken out of context. He stated that "[a]ll of the questions answered in Jack’s advice column were submitted by real students" and he "consulted with sex education experts to write Jack’s responses, with the goal of providing LGBTQ teens with practical information that’s often omitted from sex ed classes."

=== Camp (2020) ===
Camp is a young adult novel published by May 26, 2020, by Little, Brown Books for Young Readers. The book tells the story of Randall Kapplehoff, a gay teen who goes every year to a queer summer camp and is finally ready to start a relationship with his crush.

Publishers Weekly called the book a "fun, inclusive story that's sex-, romance-, and LGBTQ-positive." Kirkus Reviews said: "This novel has the appeal of a rom-com movie-makeover but with more substantive explorations." Booklist noted Rosen's attempt to tackle issues present in the LGBTQ community, such as internal biases and prejudices, and said the book was "[a]n essential pick for teens figuring out who and how to love."

As of 2021, the book is being adapted into a film directed by and starring Billy Porter.

== Recognition ==
The Guardian named Jack of Hearts (and Other Parts) one of the Best Books of the Year.

In 2020, Camp was named one of the best young adult books of the year by Hey Alma, Booklist, Elle, The Guardian, Today, and School Library Journal.

Year	Title	Award	Result	Ref.
2011	All Men of Genius	James Tiptree Jr. Award	Longlist	
2013	All Men of Genius	Audie Award for Fantasy	Finalist	
2016	Depth	Shamus Award for Best First Private Eye Novel	Finalist	
2019	Jack of Hearts (and Other Parts)	American Library Association Rainbow Book List	Top 10	
2020	Camp	Booklist Best Romance Fiction for Youth	Top 10	
2020	Camp	Booklist Editors' Choice Books for Youth	Selection	
2021	Camp	American Library Association Rainbow Book List	Top 10	
2021	Camp	Lambda Literary Award for LGBTQ Young Adult	Finalist	
2022	Lavender House	BuzzFeed Best Book of the Year, Historical	Top 2	
2022	Lavender House	Bookpage: Best Mystery and Suspense	Top 10	
2022	Lavender House	Amazon Best Mystery and Suspense	Top 20	
2023	Lavender House	Macavity Awards Sue Feder Memorial Award for Historical Mystery	Winner	
2023	Lavender House	Anthony Award for Best Historical Mystery	Finalist	
2023	Lavender House	Lambda Literary Award for Mystery	Finalist	
2023	The Bell in the Fog	Crimereads Best Historical Fiction	Top 10	
2023	The Bell in the Fog	Amazon Best Mystery and Suspense – New and Continuing Series	Top 20	
2023	Lion's Legacy	New York Public Library Best Books for Teens	Top 50	
2023	Lion's Legacy	Booklist Editors' Choice Books for Youth	Selection	
2023	Emmett	Kirkus Best Young Adult Books of the Year	Selection	
2023	Emmett	Amazon Best Teen and Young Adult Books	Top 20	
2024	Lion's Legacy	Mythopoeic Award for Young Adult Fantasy	Finalist	
2024	Rough Pages	Autostraddle Best Mystery/Thriller of the Year	Selection	
2025	Rough Pages	Lambda Literary Award for Mystery	Finalist	
2025	Rough Pages	Audie Award for Mystery	Finalist	
2025	Rough Pages	Joseph Hansen Award	Finalist	

== Publications ==
=== Novels ===
==== Adult ====
- All Men of Genius (2011)
- Depth (2015)
- Lavender House (2022) (Evander Mills #1)
- The Bell in The Fog (2023) (Evander Mills #2)
- Rough Pages (2024) (Evander Mills #3)
- Mirage City (2025) (Evander Mills #4)

==== Middle grade ====
- Woundabout, illustrated by Ellis Rosen (2015)
- The Memory Wall (2016)

==== Young adult ====
- Jack of Hearts (and Other Parts) (2018)
- Camp (2020)
- Lion's Legacy (2023) (Tennessee Russo #1)
- Emmett (2023)
- King's Legacy (2025) (Tennessee Russo #2)
- You've Goth My Heart (2025)

=== Short stories ===
- “Another Word: It Gets Better with SFF (but SFF has to Get Better, Too)” in Clarkesworld Magazine, Issue 74 (2012)

=== Forthcoming ===
- The Disaster Gay Detective Agency (June 2026)
