= Camp (novel) =

2020 book by L. C. Rosen

- Author: Lev A. C. Rosen
- Language: English
- Genre: Young adult fiction
- Publisher: Little, Brown and Company
- Publication date: May 26, 2020
- Pages: 384
- ISBN: 978-0-316-53775-9

Camp is a young adult fiction novel written by Lev A. C. Rosen and published in 2020 by Little, Brown. The book tells the story of Randall Kapplehoff, a gay teen who goes every year to a queer summer camp and is finally ready to start a relationship with his crush.

== Plot ==
Camp follows Randall Kapplehoff, a gay teen who goes to Camp Outland, a queer summer camp, every year. Randall is interested in musical theatre but rebrands himself as Del and makes himself more masculine to impress his crush, Hudson, a "masculine 'straight-acting' muscled deity."

Throughout the book, readers receive lessons about the LGBT community and its history, including definitions of genders and sexualities readers may be unfamiliar with, what happened before Stonewall, the Mattachine Society, and more. Further, the book tackles both societal and internalized homophobia.

== Background ==
Although Rosen did not attend a summer camp for queer kids, the physical layout of Camp Outland is based on a Jewish summer camp Rosen attended and worked at for several years. Rosen's camp didn't have a drama cabin, but Rosen spent years in theater.

Rosen modeled the story off the 1960s romantic comedies featuring Rock Hudson and Doris Day; he "wanted a vintage-feeling screwball sex comedy but for contemporary queer teens."

The book's title has multiple meanings: "summer camp, camp in the sense of drag queens and also camp in the sense that playing butch is a form of camp, too."

== Reception ==
Publishers Weekly called the book a "fun, inclusive story that's sex-, romance-, and LGBTQ-positive", while Kirkus Reviews said "[t]his novel has the appeal of a rom-com movie-makeover but with more substantive explorations".

Shelf Awareness highlighted how the book "unashamedly celebrates queerness" as "Rosen explores these identities without ever making them feel like stereotypes or ignoring prejudices in the community."

Maggie Reagan, who reviewed for Booklist, noted Rosen's attempt to tackle issues present in the LGBT community, such as internal biases and prejudices, similarly to how he did in his 2018 book, Jack of Hearts (and Other Parts). Reagan ended the review by calling the book "[a]n essential pick for teens figuring out who and how to love." Camp was featured by The Booklist in its list of the ten best romances for young adults published between September, 2019 and August, 2020.

Camp was named one of the best books of the year by ALMA Magazine, Booklist, Elle, The Guardian, The Today Show, and School Library Journal.

Awards for Camp
Year	Award	Result	Ref.
2020	Booklist's Best Romance Fiction for Youth	Top 10	
2020	Booklist Editors' Choice: Books for Youth	Selection	
2021	American Library Association Rainbow List	Top 10	
2021	Lambda Literary Award for LGBTQ Young Adult	Finalist	

== Film adaptation ==
In October 2021, it was announced that Camp would be adapted into a film for HBO Max And Warner Bros. The film will be directed by Billy Porter and produced by Dan Jinks with the screenplay written by Kit Williamson and Robert O’Hara. Porter will also play Mark, the camp's theater director.
