= This Day in June =

2014 picture book written by Gayle E. Pitman and illustrated by Kristyna Litten

- Author: Gayle E. Pitman
- Illustrator: Kristyna Litten
- Language: English
- Published: June 30, 2014
- Publisher: Magination Press
- Publication place: United States
- Pages: 32
- Awards: Stonewall Book Award
- ISBN: 9781433816598 Paperback edition

This Day in June is a picture book written by Gayle E. Pitman, illustrated by Kristyna Litten, and published May 5, 2014 by Magination Press. The book follows a family as they attend a pride parade.

The book won the 2015 Stonewall Book Award for Children's and Young Adult Literature, and in 2018, it was the tenth-most banned and challenged book in the United States.

== End notes ==
In addition to the story portrayed in the book, This Day in June provides "[s]ubstantial endnotes [that] discuss each scene and provide context for the people and groups represented, along with parental tips for discussing gender and sexuality." Further, "a 'Note to Parents and Caregivers' offers suggestions for talking to various age levels of children about LGBT families."

== Reception ==
A Publishers Weekly review highlighted the book's “joyous excitement” and diverse imagery. In her illustrations, Litten only outlines the happy crowds and buildings in the background ..., saving color and detail for the marchers themselves.

One Equal World stated that, "Parents who are eager to talk to their kids about the ways in which people are different, or about LGBT Pride month in general will find that This Day In June provides excellent context and serves as a conversation starter."

The book was included in Advocate's "What Book Changed the Lives of Our '40 Under 40'?" Explaining the choice, staff writer Erica Anderson wrote, "I love that it teaches tolerance and acceptance and makes pride something everyone can celebrate. The book also includes a reading guide for parents."

School Library Journal highlighted the book's "realistic" diversity, noting the inclusion of "both homosexual and heterosexual people, young and old, ... individuals, couples, and families." They continued, saying, "This beautifully illustrated book is a great addition to a school or personal library to add diversity in a responsible manner without contributing to stereotypes about LGBT people."

Awards and honors for This Day in June
Year	Award/Honor	Result	Ref.
2015	ALA Rainbow Book List	Top 10	
2015	Stonewall Book Award for Children's and Young Adult Literature	Winner	

=== Controversy ===
According to Jennifer Elaine Steele's 2022 study in Children & Libraries, This Day in June has frequently been cited in discussions of LGBTQ+ censorship in children's literature and serves as a key example of the ongoing debate around inclusive storytelling. Due to its inclusion of LGBT content, This Day in June was the tenth-most banned and challenged book in the United States in 2018, and the 42nd-most banned and challenged book between 2010 and 2019.
