= L. R. Lam =

British speculative fiction author

L.R. Lam
- Born: Laura Lam; 20th century California, U.S.
- Education: California State University, East Bay (BA); University of Aberdeen (MA)
- Occupations: Writer (novelist, short-sory writer)
- Writing career
- Pen name: Laura Ambrose
- Language: English
- Years active: 2013 – present
- Genre: Speculative fiction
- Notable works: Micah Grey trilogy, Dragon Scales series
- Notable awards: Winner, Bisexual Book Award, 2014, Pantomime; Longlist, British Science Fiction Award, Dragonfall; Barnes & Noble Speculative Monthly Pick, 2024, Dragonfall
- Website: lrlam.co.uk

Laura Lam, better known as L.R. Lam (born 20th century), is an American-Scottish novelist.

Lam is the USA Today and Sunday Times bestselling, award-winning author of Dragonfall and Emberclaw (the Dragon Scales series), the Seven Devils duology (co-written with Elizabeth May), Goldilocks, the Pacifica novels False Hearts and Shattered Minds, and the Micah Grey trilogy, which begins with Pantomime. Lam is also a writing coach at The Novelry.

Lam studied English and creative writing at California State University, East Bay and the University of Aberdeen before lecturing on the creative writing Master of Arts at Edinburgh Napier University for seven years.

They have previously written as Laura Lam and Laura Ambrose.

== Micah Grey series ==
Lam's debut novel, Pantomime, was published in 2013. It is a young-adult novel telling the story of an intersex character, Micah Grey, who has run away from home to become a circus aerialist.

Pantomime and its sequel Shadowplay were published by Strange Chemistry. In 2014, Strange Chemistry closed. In May 2015, it was announced that Tor UK had bought the rights to Pantomime, Shadowplay, and the third book in the series, Masquerade. In 2024, the series was purchased by DAW, with re-releases in 2025 and 2026.

Pantomime won the Bisexual Book Award for Speculative Fiction in 2014 at an event organised by the Bi Writers Association to increase awareness of bisexual books. It appeared on reading lists promoted by the American Library Association on its 2014 Rainbow Book List, the 2014 Popular Paperbacks List in the GLBTQ category, and on the Scottish Book Trust as their "Teens Book of the Month" in May 2014. In 2014, it was also nominated for the British Fantasy Society book awards.

Shadowplay, the second in the Micah Grey series, continues the story of Micah Grey and Drystan the White Clown, on the run and seeking help from a magician and was ranked seventeen in Fantasy Faction's Best Fantasy Books of 2014. Masquerade, the final volume of the trilogy, was published in 2017.

== Pacifica duology ==
In July 2014, Lam signed a six-figure, two-book deal with Tor Books, for the full-world English-language rights to False Hearts and Shattered Minds. Subsequently, the Italian, German, and French rights for False Hearts were taken up by Fanucci Editore, Heyne Verlag and Bragelonne respectively.

== Seven Devils duology ==
Lam and Elizabeth May co-wrote a space opera, entitled Seven Devils, published through Gollancz in the U.K. and DAW in the U.S. It is described as Mad Max: Fury Road meets Rogue One. Upon release, it hit number five on the Sunday Times Bestseller list in the U.K. The sequel, Seven Mercies, followed in January 2022.

== Dragon Scales series ==
=== Dragonfall ===
Dragonfall is the first in an epic fantasy romance series by L.R. Lam, released in May 2023 (hardback, e-book, audio) and June 2024 (paperback). Published by DAW (Astra) in the U.S., and Hodderscape (Hodder & Stoughton) in the U.K., Dragonfall featured in the Sunday Times, USA Today, and Publishers Weekly bestseller lists. It was the top-selling Barnes & Noble Speculative Monthly Pick of 2025, a Locus Recommended Read, and was longlisted for the British Science Fiction Best Novel Award.

The book has been translated into Romanian, Polish, and Italian.

=== Emberclaw ===
The sequel to Dragonfall, Emberclaw by L.R. Lam was published March 2025 by DAW (Astra) in the U.S., and Hodderscape (Hodder & Stoughton) in the U.K. in hardback, e-book, and audio. A paperback edition followed in March 2026.

Like Dragonfall, the novel has been translated into Romanian, Polish, and Italian.

== List of works by Lam ==
=== Micah Grey ===
1. Pantomime (February 2013) Strange Chemistry. Re-released in e-book through Tor UK in December 2015 and in paperback in 2016. Re-released by Astra Publishing House (DAW) in September 2025 in e-book and trade paperback.
2. Shadowplay (January 2014) Strange Chemistry. Re-released in e-book through Tor UK in December 2015 and in paperback in 2016. Re-released by Astra Publishing House (DAW) in November 2025 in e-book and trade paperback.
3. Masquerade (March 2017) Tor/Macmillan. Re-released by Astra Publishing House (DAW) in March 2026.

=== Vestigial Tales ===
1. The Snake Charm (June 2014) Penglass Publishing
2. The Fisherman's Net (July 2014) Penglass Publishing
3. The Tarot Reader (August 2014) Penglass Publishing
4. The Card Sharp (September 2014) Penglass Publishing
5. The Mechanical Minotaur (March 2017) Penglass Publishing

=== False Hearts ===
- False Hearts (June 2016) Tor/Macmillan
- Shattered Minds (June 2017) Tor/Macmillan

=== Seven Devils ===
- Seven Devils with Elizabeth May (August 2020) DAW/Gollancz
- Seven Mercies with Elizabeth May (January 2022) DAW/Gollancz

=== Dragon Scales series ===
- Dragonfall (May 2023, Astra Publishing House, U.S.; June 2024, Hodderscape, U.K.)
- Emberclaw (2025, Astra Publishing House, U.S.; Hodderscape, U.K.)

=== Goldilocks ===
- Goldilocks (April/May 2020) Wildfire/Orbit

=== Short stories ===
- "They Swim Through Sunset Seas" (2014), Solaris Rising 3, edited by Ian Whates, Solaris Books.
- "The Lioness" (March 2015), Cranky Ladies of History anthology, edited by Tehani Wessely and Tansy Rayner Roberts, Fablecroft Press.
- "A Certain Reverence" (2019), Scotland in Space: Creative Visions and Critical Reflections on Scotland's Space Futures, edited by Deborah Scott and Simon Malpas, Shoreline of Infinity.

=== As Laura Ambrose ===
==== Romancing the Page series ====
1. A Hidden Hope (October 2018) Penglass Publishing
2. A Perfect Balance (December 2018) Penglass Publishing
3. An Unheard Song (February 2019) Penglass Publishing
4. Romancing the Page (May 2019) Penglass Publishing (compendium of novellas 1–3)

===== Short stories =====
- A Frozen Night (September 2018) Penglass Publishing

== Awards and nominations ==
- American Library Association Rainbow List (2014, top-ten title – Pantomime)
- "Teens Book of the Month" for the month of May 2014 for Pantomime, Scottish Book Trust
- Sydney J. Bounds Award for Pantomime (2014, nominated)
- Bisexual Book Award for Speculative Fiction (2014, winner)
