= Pantomime (novel) =

2013 fantasy novel by L. R. Lam

- First edition (publ. Strange Chemistry)
- Author: L. R. Lam
- Publisher: Strange Chemistry
- Publication date: February 5, 2013
- Award: Bisexual Book Award (2014)
- ISBN: 978-1-90-884437-8
- Followed by: Shadowplay (2014)

Pantomime is a fantasy novel by L. R. Lam, (Note: Originally released under the author's former name, Laura Lam) originally published in 2013 by Strange Chemistry and rereleased by Tor UK in 2016. The first in the Micah Grey trilogy, Pantomime centers around an intersex character who was raised as a female in a fictional, Victorian styled world.

== Plot summary ==
The main character has two separate personas, one a female named Gene, and one as a male named Micah Grey. Raised in a well-to-do family, Gene was taught to hide that she was intersex to everyone around her. Gene spent much of her life seeing multiple doctors in an attempt to understand her condition. After discovering that her parents were planning to have her operated on without her consent, Gene runs away from home to live on the streets. After a week of scrounging on the streets and hiding from the law enforcement, Gene comes across the traveling circus on the beach. Telling the circus members that she was a runaway boy named Micah, she joins the circus, and assumes the identity of a male. Micah quickly realizes that the members of the circus have just as many secrets as he does. The ringleader and owner, Bil Ragona, is an abusive alcoholic with terrible money skills, and after his wife leaves him, the circus suffers. When Bil decides to put on a pantomime in order to attract a larger part, Micah is cast as the female lead. This leads to suspicion from some of the circus members, including Bil. Enticed by the reward for finding Gene, Bil attempts to kidnap Micah. After being rescued by a close friend in the circus, Drystan, the two escape into the city to hide from circus members and policemen alike.

== Awards and nominations ==
- Sydney J. Bounds Best Newcomer Award, British Fantasy Society 2014 (nominated)
- "Teens Book of the Month" May 2014, Scottish Book Trust
- American Library Association Rainbow List (2014, top ten title)
- Bisexual Book Award, Speculative Fiction 2014
