= Queen of the Conquered =

2019 novel by Kacen Callender

- Author: Kacen Callender
- Language: English
- Series: Islands of Blood and Storm
- Release number: 1
- Genre: Fantasy literature
- Published: 12 Nov 2019
- Publisher: Orbit Books
- Publication place: United States
- Pages: 400
- Awards: 2020 World Fantasy Award for Best Novel
- ISBN: 9780316454933
- Followed by: King of the Rising

Queen of the Conquered is a 2019 fantasy novel by Kacen Callender. Callender's adult debut, published by Orbit in 2019, the book was the 2020 winner of the World Fantasy Award. In October 2020, a Time panel rated the book one of the top 100 fantasy novels of all-time.

== Plot ==
Sigourney Rose is an ethnically native islander from the Hans Lollik archipelago. She is the only survivor after the wealthy Jannik family massacres her mother and siblings. Sigourney is taken in by the Lund family and eventually inherits the title Elskerinde Lund. (Note: Elskerinde is the feminine title for an island’s leader; Herre is the masculine title.) Her rule has been complicated by various slave rebellions, as well as racism from the other noble families of the kongelig. (Note: The kongelig are the wealthiest families in Hans Lollik, serving as the archipelago’s nobility.) Aside from Sigourney, all of the other members of the kongelig belong to the pale-skinned Fjern ethnic group, who colonized Hans Lollik centuries prior.

Sigourney possesses a rare and formidable ability known as “kraft.” Kraft comes in many forms; Sigourney’s kraft allows her to read and control minds. She uses her powers to manipulate the memories of the dying Elskerinde Freja Jannik. Sigourney is betrothed to Freja’s son Aksel, who despises her but needs the Lund family money.

The childless regent Konge Valdemar announces his intention to choose a successor from among the kongelig families. Sigourney survives an assassination attempt. She captures the assassin but finds herself unable to read his mind or control him with kraft. She brings her prisoner and a small retinue to Hans Lollik Helle, the royal island. Sigourney learns that her would-be assassin is Løren Jannik. Løren is the mixed-race half-brother of Aksel Jannik, who attempted to have Sigourney killed for political purposes. Aksel and Sigourney are legally married, making her the new Elskerinde Jannik. Sigourney appoints Løren to be her personal guard.

Members of the kongelig on Hans Lollik Helle include other powerful nobles who have their own kraft. Patrika Årud has the ability to control pain; Jytte Solberg controls fear; Lothar Niklasson can compel others to speak only the truth; twins Erik and Alida Nørup share thoughts.

Sigourney realizes that Konge Valdemar is an imposter. His mind appears to be empty, as though he is an illusion or a corpse. Members of the kongelig begin dying. The false king sends Sigourney to assassinate the head of the Ludjivik family. The Ludjiviks are powerful Fjern, but not members of the kongelig; Herre Ludjivik has stirred up slave rebellions to increase his own power. Sigourney successfully kills him and returns to Hans Lollik Helle.

Beata Larsen, Aksel’s lover, is found dead. At Beata’s funeral, Løren punches Aksel. Sigourney saves him from execution by allowing him to be flogged. Sigourney is proven innocent of Beata’s death, but her manipulation of Freja Jannik is revealed. The puppet king allows her to live, but he declares that she and Aksel will never be named as his successors. Aksel attempts to kill Løren, but is stabbed and killed. Sigourney and Løren dispose of the body together. The next day, she finds Aksel alive, and realizes that someone is manipulating her sense of reality. Sigourney is stabbed by an unknown assailant, but recovers.

The kongelig prepare for war against the remaining Ludjiviks. Sigourney travels to Valdemar Helle, abandoned since Konge Valdemar became regent. Near the graves of his wife and infant daughter, Sigourney finds the murdered body of Konge Valdemar. The kongelig defeat the remaining of the Ludjiviks and return to Hans Lollik Helle.

Aksel leaves the island for good. Patrika's husband is murdered; she withdraws from consideration to become regent. Sigourney allies with Alida Nørup against Lothar Niklasson and Jytte Solberg. Erik Nørup is murdered; Alida leaves the island. All of Sigourney’s slaves except Løren are massacred.

Sigourney and Løren are allowed to leave the island. Løren reveals that he and the slaves on Hans Lollik Helle have orchestrated the death of the king and the kongelig. Agatha is a slave girl with the kraft to make illusions; she has been manipulating the perceptions of the kongelig throughout the story. She has been present for the entire story, but Sigourney's arrogance has caused her to ignore the native islanders, treating them as inferior to the kongelig. Agatha kills Jytte; Lothar is taken as a hostage. Sigourney fights Agatha, eventually stabbing and killing her. With Agatha’s death, Sigourney is the most powerful remaining wielder of kraft on the island; she agrees to join Løren and the revolutionaries.

== Reception ==
It received starred reviews from Kirkus Reviews and School Library Journal. Alex Brown of Tor.com said that the book "makes for an occasionally challenging read", with Sigourney's character being generally passive, but that "everything else was nothing short of remarkable", saying that "often, stories about racial violence and slavery break people into white and POC, colonizer and colonized. With Sigourney and Løren, Callender explores the in between."

Kerine Wint of FIYAH Literary Magazine said that the book had a "wonderfully-done deconstructed approach to the journey of a tragic hero" and that it was "a new insert in the slavery-centric fantasy that does not ask us to sympathize with evil behaviour and evil people". Jason Heller of NPR said the book was "a refreshing break from the stereotypical, pseudo-European setting of most epic fantasy" and remarked positively on "Sigourney's first-person, present-tense perspective," saying that it was "morally conflicted and viscerally impactful, her voice is a thing of lean poetry that's made all the more dimensional by her ability to peer into the thoughts of others — and to influence their actions."
