= Joseph Hansen Award =

Literary award for LGBT crime books

The Joseph Hansen Award for LGBTQ+ Crime Writing, established in 2023, is an annual literary award presented by the Publishing Triangle to honor crime fiction or nonfiction books with LGBTQIA+ themes. The award honors American novelist Joseph Hansen (1923–2004). Winners receive a $1,000 prize.

== Recipients ==
Award winners and finalists
| Year | Author | Title | Publisher | Result | Ref. |
|---|---|---|---|---|---|
| 2023 | Val McDermid | 1989: An Allie Burns Novel | Grove Atlantic | Winner | |
| 2023 | Robyn Gigl | Survivor's Guilt | Kensington | Finalist | |
| 2023 | Rosalie Knecht | Vera Kelly Lost and Found | Tin House | Finalist | |
| 2023 | Jane Pek | The Verifiers | Knopf Doubleday Publishing | Finalist | |
| 2024 | J. M. Redmann | Transitory | Bold Strokes Books | Winner | |
| 2024 | Renee James | BeatNikki's Cafe | Amble Press/Bywater Books | Finalist | |
| 2024 | Christopher Bollen | The Lost Americans | HarperCollins | Finalist | |
| 2024 | Robyn Gigl | Remain Silent | Kensington Publishing Corporation | Finalist | |
| 2025 | Margot Douaihy | Blessed Water | Zando/Gillian Flynn Books | Winner | |
| 2025 | Catherine Hernandez | Behind You | HarperCollins | Finalist | |
| 2025 | Gary Zebrun | Hart Island | University of Wisconsin Press | Finalist | |
| 2025 | Lev A. C. Rosen | Rough Pages | Forge Books | Finalist | |
| 2026 | Lev A. C. Rosen | Mirage City | Minotaur Books | Winner | |
| 2026 | John Copenhaver and Salem West (eds.) | Crime Ink: Iconic | Bywater Books | Finalist | |
| 2026 | Cathy Pegau | A Murderous Business | Minotaur Books | Finalist | |
| 2026 | J. M. Redmann | The Smallest Day | Bold Strokes Books | Finalist | |
| 2026 | Eddy Boudel Tan | The Tiger and the Cosmonaut | Viking Canada | Finalist | |
