= Kirstin Cronn-Mills =

American author of children's books

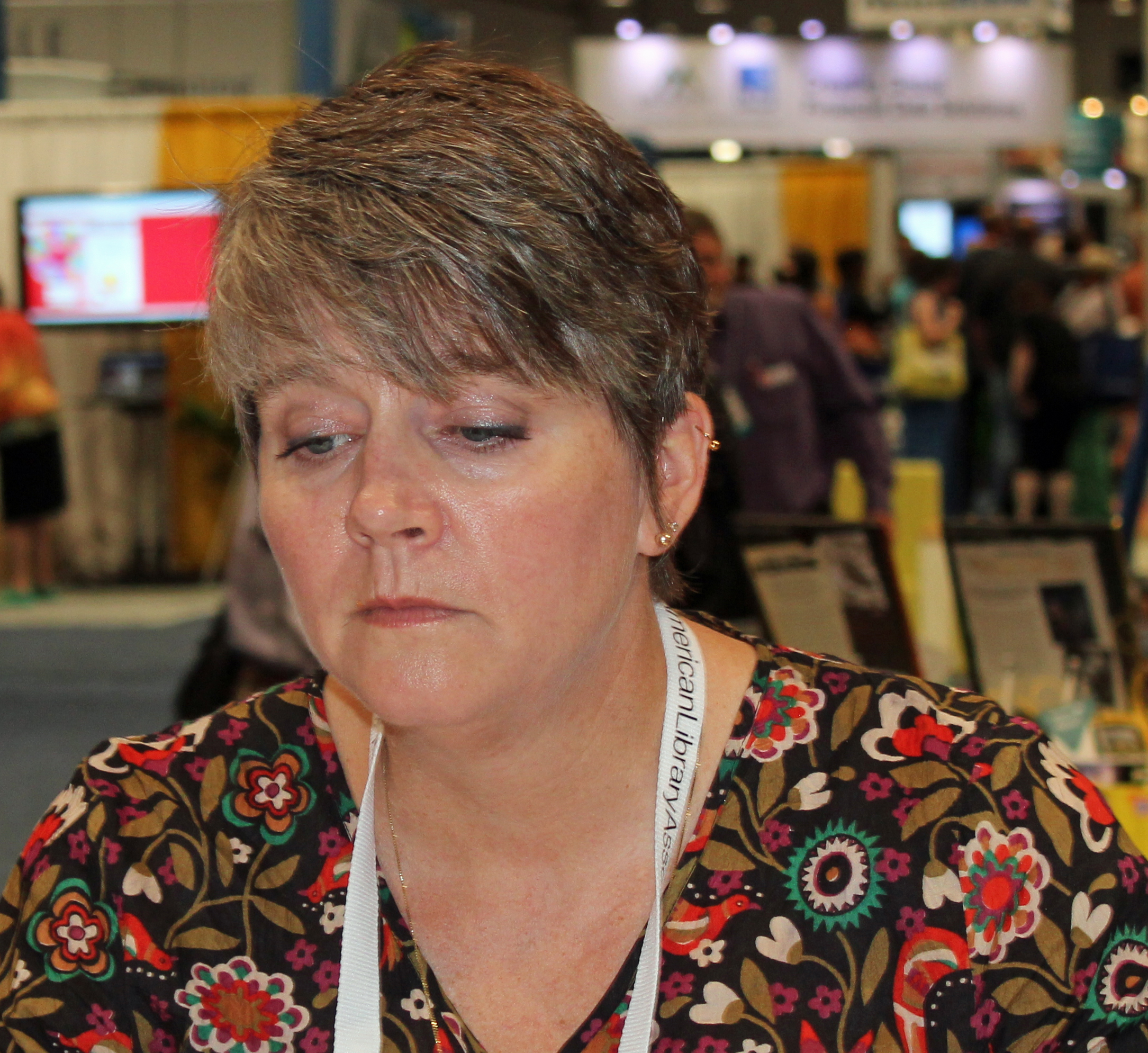
Kirstin Cronn-Mills

Kirstin Cronn-Mills is an American author of children's books including the Minnesota Book Award finalist The Sky Always Hears Me And the Hills Don't Mind (2009) and Beautiful Music for Ugly Children (2012) which was a Stonewall Book Award winner and a Lambda Literary Award finalist. Her third novel, Original Fake (2016), was a Minnesota Book Award finalist in 2017, along with her third nonfiction volume for high school libraries, LGBTQ+ Athletes Claim the Field. Her fourth novel, Wreck, will be published in 2019.

Cronn-Mills received a doctorate from Iowa State University and currently teaches at South Central College, a two-year college in North Mankato, Minnesota.

== Personal life and career ==
Kirstin Cronn-Mills was born in Virginia and raised in Cozad, Nebraska before she moved to Mankato, Minnesota in 1992. She met her husband, Daniel Cronn-Mills while attending the University of Nebraska-Lincoln, and their son was born in 1998.

Cronn-Mills's family enjoyed reading, and "according to her mother, she learned to read when she was three." She began writing poetry in middle school, though now primarily writes young adult fiction.

Cronn-Mills received a Master of Arts degree from the University of Nebraska-Lincoln and her Ph.D. from Iowa State University. She currently teaches writing, literature, and critical thinking at South Central College.

After the 2016 election, Kirstin and her husband founded the Ally Network of Minnesota, later renamed the Solidarity Network of Minnesota, which "supports work in the community focused on fair and equal treatment, alerts members to people who could use support, posts educational resources, and works to hold members of the majority culture accountable." In 2019, the Cronn-Mills received the Greater Makato Pathfinder Award for founding the network.

== Selected publications ==
=== The Sky Always Hears Me: And the Hills Don't Mind (2009) ===
The Sky Always Hears Me: And the Hills Don't Mind, published in 2009 by Flux, is a young adult novel about Morgan, a teen living in Nebraska, who, despite having a boyfriend, kisses her classmate Tessa.

The book was a 2010 finalist for the Minnesota Book Award for Young People's Literature.

=== Beautiful Music for Ugly Children (2012) ===
Beautiful Music for Ugly Children, published in 2012 by North Star Editions, is a young adult novel about Gabe, a transgender youth. When Cronn-Mills was writing the book, she frequently visited RECLAIM, "a Twin Cities-based organization that offers counseling and other services to transsexual [sic] and LGBT youth;" all who donate at least ten dollars to the organization will receive a copy of Beautiful Music for Ugly Children.

The book received the following accolades:

- Green Mountain Book Award nominee (2015)
- American Library Association (ALA) Stonewall Book Award winner (2014)
- Independent Publisher Book Awards IPPY silver medal for LGBT+ Fiction (2014)
- Top Ten Book for the ALA Rainbow List (2013)
- ALA's Best Fiction for Young Adults (2013)
- Lambda Literary Award finalist (2012)

=== Transgender Lives (2014) ===
Transgender Lives: Complex Stories, Complex Voices, published in 2014 by Twenty-First Century Books, is a nonfiction anthology of seven transgender individuals who share their stories about what it means to be transgender. Through the book, readers will "earn how they each came to better understand, accept, and express their gender identities," and will "follow them through the sorrows and successes of their personal journeys."

In 2015, Bank Street College placed the book on the list of Best Children's Books of the Year.

=== Original Fake (2016) ===
Original Fake, published in 2016 by Penguin Young Readers group and illustrated by E. Eero Johnson, is an illustrated young adult novel about Frankie Neumann, an introvert with an eccentric family, who dreams of becoming a street artist.

The book was selected by the Junior Library Guild and received favorable reviews from the Bulletin of the Center for Children's Books, The Horn Book Guide, and Kirkus Reviews, as well as a starred review from Publishers Weekly. Additionally, in 2017, the book was a finalist for the Minnesota Book Award for Young Adult Literature. The same year, Bank Street College selected it as one of the Best Children's Books of the Year.

=== LGBTQ+ Athletes Claim the Field (2016) ===
LGBTQ+ Athletes Claim the Field: Striving for Equality, published in 2016 by Twenty-First Century Books, is a nonfiction book about queer athletes and how their status has changed—and still needs to change.

The book received favorable reviews from Kirkus Reviews and School Library Journal, a starred review from Booklist, as well as the following accolades:

- Junior Library Guild selection
- Booklist Top 10 Books for Youth (2017)
- American Library Association Rainbow List selection (2017)
- Bank Street College's Best Children's Books of the Year selection (2017)
- Minnesota Book Award finalist for Young Adult Literature (2017)
- Young Adult Library Services Association Quick Pick Nomination (2016)

== Bibliography ==
=== Fiction ===
- The Sky Always Hears Me: And the Hills Don't Mind. North Star Editions. 2009. ISBN 978-0-73-872265-8.
- Beautiful Music for Ugly Children. North Star Editions. October 8, 2012. ISBN 978-0-73-873265-7.
- Original Fake. Penguin Young Readers Group. 2016. ISBN 978-0-39-917326-4.
- Wreck. Sky Pony Press. April 2, 2019. ISBN 978-1-51-073904-8.
- Rules for Camouflage. Little, Brown and Company. 2024. ISBN 978-0-31-656795-4.

=== Nonfiction ===
- Collapse!: The Science of Structural Engineering Failures. Compass Point Books. January 1, 2009. ISBN 978-0-75-654061-6.
- Transgender Lives: Complex Stories, Complex Voices. Lerner Publishing Group. September 1, 2014. ISBN 978-0-76-139022-0.
- LGBTQ+ Athletes Claim the Field: Striving for Equality. Twenty-First Century Books. August 1, 2016. ISBN 978-1-46-778012-4.
