= Original Fake =

2016 graphic novel by Kirstin Cronn-Mills

- Author: Kirstin Cronn-Mills
- Language: English
- Subject: Street art
- Genre: Young adult fiction, Graphic novel
- Publisher: G.P. Putnam's Sons Books for Young Readers
- Publication date: April 19, 2016
- Publication place: United States
- Media type: Print
- ISBN: 9780399173264

Original Fake is a young adult graphic novel written by Kirstin Cronn-Mills, illustrated by E. Eero Johnson, and published April 19, 2016 by G.P. Putnam's Sons Books for Young Readers.

The novel tells the story of Frankie Neumann, an introvert with an eccentric family, who dreams of becoming a street artist.

== Reception ==
Original Fake received a starred review from Publishers Weekly, as well as positive reviews from the Lambda Literary Foundation, The Horn Book Guide, School Library Journal, The Bulletin of the Center for Children's Books, Kirkus, The Manhattan Book Review, and Booklist. The book was also selected by the Junior Library Guild.

Original Fake received the following accolades:

- Minnesota Book Award for Young Adult Literature finalist (2017)
- Bank Street College Best Children's Books of the Year selection (2017)
