= Beautiful Music for Ugly Children =

2012 young adult novel by Kirstin Cronn-Mills

- Author: Kirstin Cronn-Mills
- Language: English
- Subject: Transgender youth
- Genre: Young adult fiction
- Publisher: North Star Editions
- Publication date: October 1, 2012
- Publication place: United States
- Media type: Print
- ISBN: 9780738732510

Beautiful Music for Ugly Children is a young adult novel by Kirstin Cronn-Mills, published October 8, 2012, by North Star Editions. The book tells the story of Gabe, a transgender high school student. It received various awards and was a finalist for the Lambda Literary Award for Children's and Young Adult Literature.

When Cronn-Mills was writing the book, she frequently visited RECLAIM, "a Twin Cities-based organization that offers counseling and other services to transsexual [sic] and LGBT youth." Anyone who donated at least ten dollars to the organization received a copy of Beautiful Music for Ugly Children.

== Plot ==
Beautiful Music for Ugly Children follows the story of Gabe, a transgender teen navigating life after coming out as male. Gabe has always felt like a boy, even though he was born as Elizabeth. His passion is music, and he hosts a late-night radio show called "Beautiful Music for Ugly Children," where he shares his love for music and his journey of self-discovery. As Gabe gains a following on his radio show, he begins to embrace his identity more fully. However, he also faces challenges, including bullying and the complexities of his relationships with family and friends who are adjusting to his transition. Throughout the novel, Gabe learns to find his voice, assert his identity, and pursue his dreams despite the obstacles he faces.

== Reception ==
=== Reviews ===
Beautiful Music for Ugly Children was well received by critics. Kirkus Reviews referred to the novel as "a kind and satisfyingly executed portrait of a music-loving teen coming out as transgender". Michael Cart, writing for Booklist, highlighted the "nuggets of humor in an otherwise serious story", noting that "Cronn-Mills' thoughtful book joins a small but growing body of literature that gives faces to this traditionally invisible minority" of transgender youth. Despite the lack of existing literature, Publishers Weekly found that

Cronn-Mills [...] has clearly done her research. Gabe's difficulties—from dealing with freaked-out parents and bigoted classmates to navigating love, sex, and whether to use the men's or women's room—are well documented. So much so, in fact, that the book sometimes feels like a PSA exposing the challenges a trans teen faces. Cronn-Mills never minimizes those challenges (Gabe faces some terrifying abuse), avoiding a too-happy ending, but Gabe and Paige's supportive friendship and Gabe's love of music shine through.

Multiple reviews mentioned that readers may have to suspend disbelief a bit while reading, including how "Gabe's radio show becomes an underground hit, generating a difficult-to-believe-but-pleasing-to-imagine cadre of fans calling themselves the Ugly Children Brigade". School Library Journal's Betty S. Evans further noted that the novel "wraps up a bit too quickly".

Reviewers also discussed the book's characters, with Cart referring to Gabe as "an always appealing character". However, Kirkus Reviews noted that the book's "show-stealer" is "John, a unique, well-conceived, funny and loving figure whose enthusiasm for music and endless support for Gabe", which "provides solidity and warmth amid the many changes Gabe experiences." Evans similarly found that "he quirky relationship between Gabe and John and their shared music obsession elevates this story above the average problem novel."

=== Awards and honors ===
In 2013, the American Library Association included Beautiful Music for Ugly Children on their list of the Best Fiction for Young Adults.

Accolades for Beautiful Music for Ugly Children
Year	Accolade	Result	Ref.
2012	Lambda Literary Award for Children's and Young Adult Literature	Finalist	
2013	American Library Association Rainbow Book List	Top Ten	
2014	Independent Publisher Book Awards for LGBT+ Fiction	Silver Medal	
2014	Stonewall Book Award	Winner	
2014	Young Adult Library Service Association's Popular Paperbacks for Young Adults	Top Ten	
2015	Green Mountain Book Award	Nominee	
