= King and the Dragonflies =

2020 novel by Kacen Callender

- First edition
- Author: Kacen Callender
- Language: English
- Genre: Fiction
- Publisher: Scholastic Press
- Publication date: February 4, 2020
- Publication place: United States
- Pages: 272
- Awards: National Book Award for Young People's Literature
- ISBN: 978-1-338-12933-5

King and the Dragonflies is a young adult fiction book published in February 2020 by Scholastic Press and written by Saint Thomian author Kacen Callender. It is Callendar's second novel that explores the intersection between race, gender roles and sexuality. King and the Dragonflies has received a National Book Award for Young People's Literature (2020), a Coretta Scott King Honor Book Award (2021), and a Lambda Literary Award (2021).

== Plot ==
Kingston "King" James is a 12-year-old who lives in Louisiana. His brother Khalid has recently died, but King is convinced that Khalid has returned to him as a dragonfly.

While mourning the loss of his brother, King has also broken things off with his best friend, Sandy Sanders. A few days before he died, Khalid had told him that there was a rumor that Sandy was gay, and that King must stop hanging out with him, since Khalid does not want such a rumour to be associated with his brother. Sandy disappears, and after a long search King finds him, restores the friendship, and agrees to help Sandy escape life with his abusive father.

== Reception ==
Em Nordling at Tor.com said that "[f]or such a short novel, it packs a lot of punch, and never once feels rushed or didactic—it lets emotions be messy and lets characters be human," and called the book "Riveting, emotionally real thing—as lived-in as a childhood bedroom, and incredibly kind and generous at its core."

Elizabeth Bird, who reviewed the novel for the School Library Journal, said it was "the perfect balancing act." It won the National Book Award for Young People's Literature in 2020.

A review on Common Sense Media called the book "lush and lyrical, a joy to read solely for the beauty of the sentences ... There are several sob-worthy passages, though ultimately this is a deeply hopeful and inspiring tale that will leave readers smiling, even if it's through happy tears."
