= A. J. Sass =

American children's writer

- Born: United States
- Occupation: Novelist
- Writing career
- Language: English
- Years active: 2020–present
- Genres: Middle grade, young adult: contemporary, sports, LGBTQIA+, fiction, nonfiction
- Notable works: Ana on the Edge; Ellen Outside the Lines; Camp Quiltbag; Just Shy of Ordinary
- Website: sassinsf.com

Andrew "A. J." Sass is an American author of children's and young adult fiction, best known for his (Note: Sass identifies as transmasculine and nonbinary, and uses he/him and they/them pronouns. This article uses "he" for consistency.) middle grade contemporary novels featuring queer, Jewish, and autistic characters, as well as his Time op-ed discussing transgender and non-binary character representation in youth literature.

== Personal life ==
Sass grew up in the Midwestern and Southern United States and began training in figure skating as a child. He passed his U.S. Figure Skating Senior Moves in the Field test while in law school, then worked as a technical writer and legal editor while writing creatively on the side. His debut middle grade novel, Ana on the Edge, about a U.S. Juvenile Figure Skater, was purchased by Little, Brown Books for Young Readers.

At the age of 33, Sass passed the U.S. Figure Skating Senior Free Skate test, then went on to compete as a member of the Masters synchronized skating team, IceSymmetrics. IceSymmetrics won the bronze medal at the 2018 U.S. Synchronized Skating Championships and the silver medal at the 2019 U.S. Synchronized Skating Championships. Sass also holds test judge appointments with U.S. Figure Skating in Gold Singles and Bronze Ice Dance.

Sass is Jewish and autistic. He describes himself as gay, transmasculine and non-binary, and uses he/him and they/them pronouns.

He lives in the San Francisco Bay Area with his husband.

== Selected works ==
=== Ana on the Edge ===
Sass' debut novel follows twelve-year-old Ana-Marie Jin, the reigning U.S. Juvenile figure skating champion, as Ana navigates old and new friendships, the financial hardships of elite figure skating, and a newly discovered non-binary gender identity. It was published by Little, Brown Books for Young Readers on October 20, 2020, and received a starred review from Booklist. Ana on the Edge went on to be named a Booklist Editors' Choice: Books for Youth, 2020 selection, an American Library Association 2021 Rainbow List Top 10 for Young Readers title, a selection in the Chicago Review of Books Notable List of Debut Books by Trans, Non-binary, and Gender Non-conforming Authors, and was named to the New York Public Library's "Favorite Trans, Nonbinary, and GNC Titles of 2020. It also received a favorable review in The New York Times Book Review.

=== Ellen Outside the Lines ===
Sass' second novel features Ellen Katz, an autistic thirteen-year-old, who is attempting to regain a long-time friendship on a class trip to Barcelona, Spain. It explores Spanish and Catalan culture, as well as queer and Jewish identity. Ellen Outside the Lines was named an American Library Association 2023 Rainbow List Top 10 for Young Readers title, and received a 2023 Sydney Taylor Book Award Honor. It was released on March 22, 2022, from Little, Brown Books for Young Readers.

=== Camp QUILTBAG ===
Co-authored with Nicole Melleby, Camp QUILTBAG is a story about twelve-year-old Abigail Rabb and thirteen-year-old Kai Lindquist, who are attending a summer camp for queer youth for vastly different reasons. They make a pact to help themselves settle in at camp, all while navigating their queer identities and a competition pitting cabin against cabin. It was released by Algonquin Young Readers on March 21, 2023. It was named an American Library Association 2024 Rainbow List Top 10 for Young Readers title.

=== Just Shy of Ordinary ===
Sass' 2024 novel features Shai, a Jewish, nonbinary thirteen year-old with dermatillomania who copes with starting public school for the first time. Shai tries to establish new routines, explore their queer identity, and cope with stress while maintaining friendships and family connection. It received a 2025 Sydney Taylor Book Award Honor.

== Bibliography ==
Novels

- Ana on the Edge (Little, Brown Books for Young Readers, 2020)
- Ellen Outside the Lines (Little, Brown Books for Young Readers, 2022)
- Camp QUILTBAG (Algonquin Young Readers, 2023; co-authored with Nicole Melleby)
- Just Shy of Ordinary (Little, Brown Books for Young Readers, 2024)

Essays

- "This Is What It Feels Like" in Allies: Real Talk About Showing Up, Screwing Up, and Trying Again (DK/Penguin Random House, 2021)

Short stories

- "Balancing Acts" in This Is Our Rainbow: 16 Stories of Her, Him, Them, and Us (Knopf Books for Young Readers, 2021)

Op eds

- "I'm a Nonbinary Writer of Youth Literature. J.K. Rowling's Comments on Gender Identity Reinforced My Commitment to Better Representation" (Time, 2020)
