= Page Powars =

American romance author

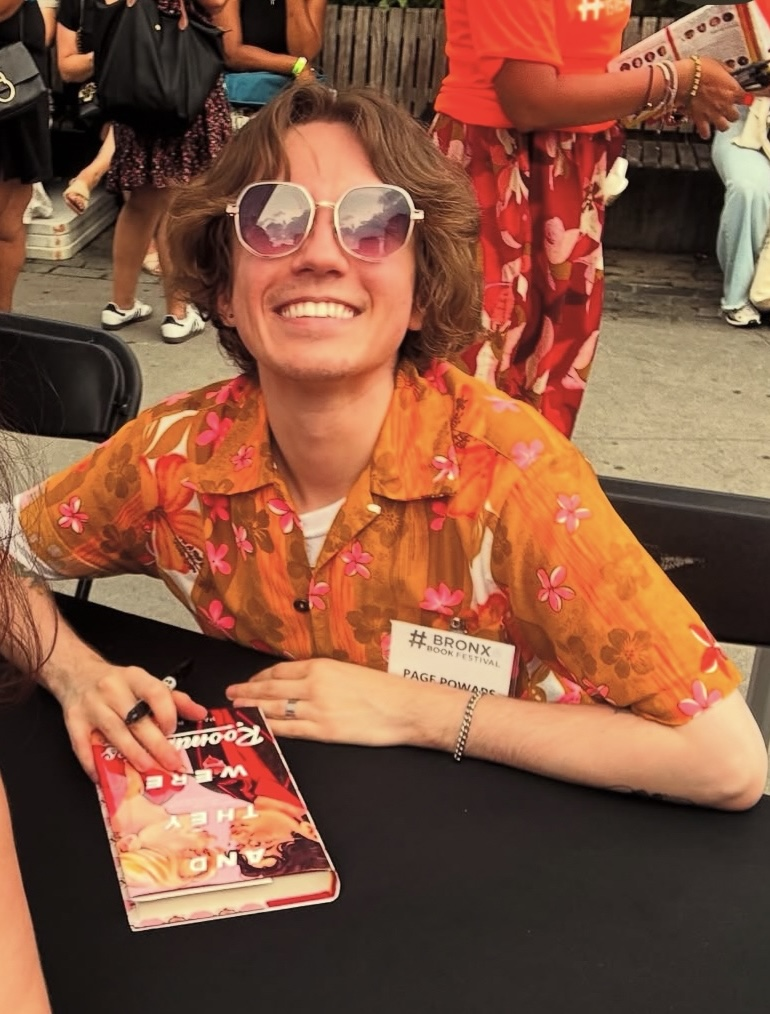
- Powars at the 2025 Bronx Book Festival
- Education: University of Michigan
- Writing career
- Period: 2023-present
- Genre: Romance
- Notable work: And They Were Roommates
- Website: pagepowars.com

Page Powars is an American author, best known for his queer romance novel And They Were Roommates.

== Life and education ==
Page Powars was born in Michigan, United States.

He attended the University of Michigan School of Music, Theatre, & Dance and graduated with a Bachelor of Fine Arts in music composition and technology. He then received a master's degree in publishing from New York University.

He lives in Brooklyn, New York City.

== Career ==
Powars' first novel, The Borrow a Boyfriend Club, was simultaneously published by Penguin Random House in North America and Hachette in the United Kingdom on September 12, 2023.

His second novel, And They Were Roommates, was published May 27, 2025 by Macmillan Publishers in North America and Hachette in the United Kingdom. The book is a New York Times and USA Today bestseller. The story follows Charlie von Hevringprinz, a transgender high schooler stuck dorming with his ex who fails to recognize him after his transition. In May 2025, People named And They Were Roommates their Book of the Week. In June 2025, Rolling Stone named And They Were Roommates as one of the top twenty queer romance novels of all time.

Powars' third novel, But I Hate Him, releases on August 25, 2026.
