= Forgive Me If I've Told You This Before =

2014 young adult novel by Karelia Stetz-Waters

- Cover Art for Forgive Me If I've Told You This Before
- Author: Karelia Stetz-Waters
- Language: English
- Genre: Young adult
- Publication date: 2014
- Publication place: United States
- ISBN: 9781932010732

Forgive Me If I've Told You This Before is a young adult LGBT coming of age story written by Karelia Stetz-Waters. The book is set in a 1992 rural Oregon town during the middle of the campaign against homosexual equal rights known as the 1992 Oregon Ballot Measure 9. The book was first published on October 9, 2014, by Ooligan Press. Parts of the book are based on an unpublished memoir by Stetz-Waters.

== Book synopsis ==
The book features Triinu Hoffman, a shy and intellectual teen who lives in 1992 rural Oregon. She has troubles fitting in and does her best to hide her true self, all in an attempt to hide from the bullying behavior of classmates. The school principal is no help against her poor treatment because he tends to treat her just as badly as the bullies.

Triinu experiences new feelings of attraction towards other women, she finds her first love and establishes her teenage independence. She struggles with her differences during a time where Oregon is voting on the discrimination rights in the 1992 Ballot Measure 9. She comes to realize that these differences will make her a target during this fight for equal rights, but she also realizes that if she accepts her differences, she will finally be set free.

Triinu learns to stand for what she believes in, she learns how to love, and she learns what it means to have her heart broken.

== Awards and critical reception ==
Forgive Me If I've Told You This Before was one of the top ten books on the Gay, Lesbian, Bisexual, and Transgender Round Table's 2016 Rainbow Book List. Lambda Literary called the book "an ambitious mix of politics, first loves, lost friends, family, grief, cultural heritage, and identity". The book also received positive reviews in Curve magazine and School Library Journal.

It is also available as a Kindle book.
