= Ellen Outside the Lines =

2022 children's book by A.J. Sass

- Author: A. J. Sass
- Publisher: Little, Brown and Company
- Publication date: 2022
- ISBN: 9780759556270
- OCLC: 1256251387

Ellen Outside the Lines is a middle-grade novel by A. J. Sass. It was published in 2022 by Little, Brown and Company. The story revolves around Ellen Katz, a Jewish and autistic child from the United States who goes on a class trip to Barcelona, Spain.

== Themes ==
Ellen Outside the Lines deals with autism, LGBTQ+ related topics, and Judaism. The main character, Ellen, is autistic, and to cope with unfamiliar social situations she stims, and uses noise-cancelling headphones to avoid sensory overload in noisy and crowded places. The author, A.J. Sass, based elements of Ellen's autism on his own experiences as an autistic person. According to Sass, the view expressed by Ellen that "being autistic isn't bad or abnormal, it's unique and different" is one he shares. Throughout the story Ellen, who knows she is not straight, also explores her gender identity and decides she would be comfortable using she/her and they/them pronouns. The book also deals with the long-lasting friendship between Ellen and her best friend, Laurel, which has become strained.

The story is told using a first person point of view.

== Reception ==
Ellen Outside the Lines was widely praised for the way it depicted autism, with a review in The News-Gazette saying that the reader is given the opportunity to "experience [Ellen's] autism with her". Booklist also noted the way that Strass had created a "world that celebrates autism for the joy it brings Ellen." Reviews also focused on the way the book handled LGBTQ+ issues and characters. The Horn Book Magazine claimed that "presence of multiple queer characters allows for a variety of feelings" to be expressed, and, alongside the Bulletin of the Center for Children's Books, listed that the existence of non-binary characters as one of the elements that helped Ellen come to terms with the nuances of personal identity. Several reviews noted Sass's incorporation of Ellen's Jewish identity, and in particular noted the book's use of Hebrew phrases and reference to Jewish practices such as the keeping of a kosher diet.

The Bulletin of the Center for Children's Books criticized the subplots and Ellen's parents, feeling that their addition detracted from the main story, but praised the work overall.

In 2023, the Lexington County School District Two in South Carolina removed thirty books, including Ellen Outside the Lines, from school libraries. After deliberation by a committee and an appeal, the school board chose to retain Ellen Outside the Lines.

The book was a 2023 Sydney Taylor Book Award Honor Book in the middle-grade category.
