= Girls of Paper and Fire (book) =

2018 young adult fantasy novel by Natasha Ngan

- Author: Natasha Ngan
- Language: English
- Series: Girls of Paper and Fire series
- Genre: Young adult, Fantasy
- Publisher: Little, Brown, and Company
- Publication date: 2018
- Publication place: United Kingdom
- Pages: 336 (first edition, hardback)
- ISBN: 978-0-316-56136-5 (first edition, hardback)
- Followed by: Girls of Storm and Shadow

Girls of Paper and Fire is a 2018 young adult fantasy novel by Natasha Ngan. It is the first book in the Girls of Paper and Fire trilogy. The book explores a forbidden romance between two girls who were picked to become one of the king's eight new concubines. The book was touted by the American Library Association as a love story between two women which is considered to be unique in young adult fantasy.

== Plot summary ==
The novel is set the Chinese-Malaysia-inspired fictional kingdom Ikhara, in which there are three castes, Moon Caste, also called Demons, with full animal-like features on a humanoid form; Steel Caste, humans with partial animal demon features; and Paper Caste, fully human. The Moon Caste is considered the ruling caste, ruling over the others, while the Paper Caste is considered the lowest caste, often likened to objects more than people. Every year eight girls from Paper Caste are chosen as "Paper Girls" to serve the Demon King as sex slaves.

The book tells the story of Lei a seventeen-year-old girl who is chosen as the ninth Paper Girl. Paper Girls are not allowed to take lovers, but during her rigorous training to become a suitable Paper Girl, Lei falls for Wren, another Paper Girl. Fearing for her life after refusing the king, Lei desperately tries to find a way to escape, not only for herself, but for Wren too.

== Characters ==
- Lei, a seventeen-year-old girl from the Paper caste with golden eyes, which are a sign of good luck. It is because of her eyes that she is summoned to be the ninth Paper Girl, a concubine to the Demon King. At the Women's Court Lei is trained to become a proper Paper Girl, and falls for Wren even though it is prohibited.
- Wren, a Paper Caste girl chosen to become a Paper Girl alongside Lei and seven other girls. Closed off at first, she slowly starts opening up to Lei and the two begin a forbidden relationship.
- The Demon King, a bull demon and ruler of Ikhara.
- Aoki, one of the Paper Girls and Lei's best friend. Over her time staying at the Women's Court she develops feelings for the Demon King.
- Blue, one of the Paper Girls. Daughter of one of the few aristocratic Paper families in the kingdom of Ikhara, she looks down on Lei and treats her cruelly from time to time.
- Mariko, Blue's friend who is banished from the palace with the word 烂 (Chinese: làn, meaning: rotten) carved into her forehead, after her relationship with a soldier is discovered.
- Zhen and Zhin, twins and Paper Girls, from one of the few aristocratic Paper families in the kingdom of Ikhara.
- Chenna, one of the Paper Girls.
- Rue, a Paper Caste girl who used an enchantment on herself to become a Paper Girl. After she was discovered she was banished from the palace.

== Background ==
This novel explores topics of sexual assault, homophobia, and the commodification of women's bodies. The author herself is a survivor of sexual abuse, stating that it was important to her to introduce these topics to teens in a sensible manner, while not exploiting the (sexual) violence perpetrated shock value.

== Reception ==
Girls of Paper and Fire debuted on the New York Times Bestseller List for Young Adult Hardcover.
