= Kacen Callender =

Saint Thomian author (born 1989)

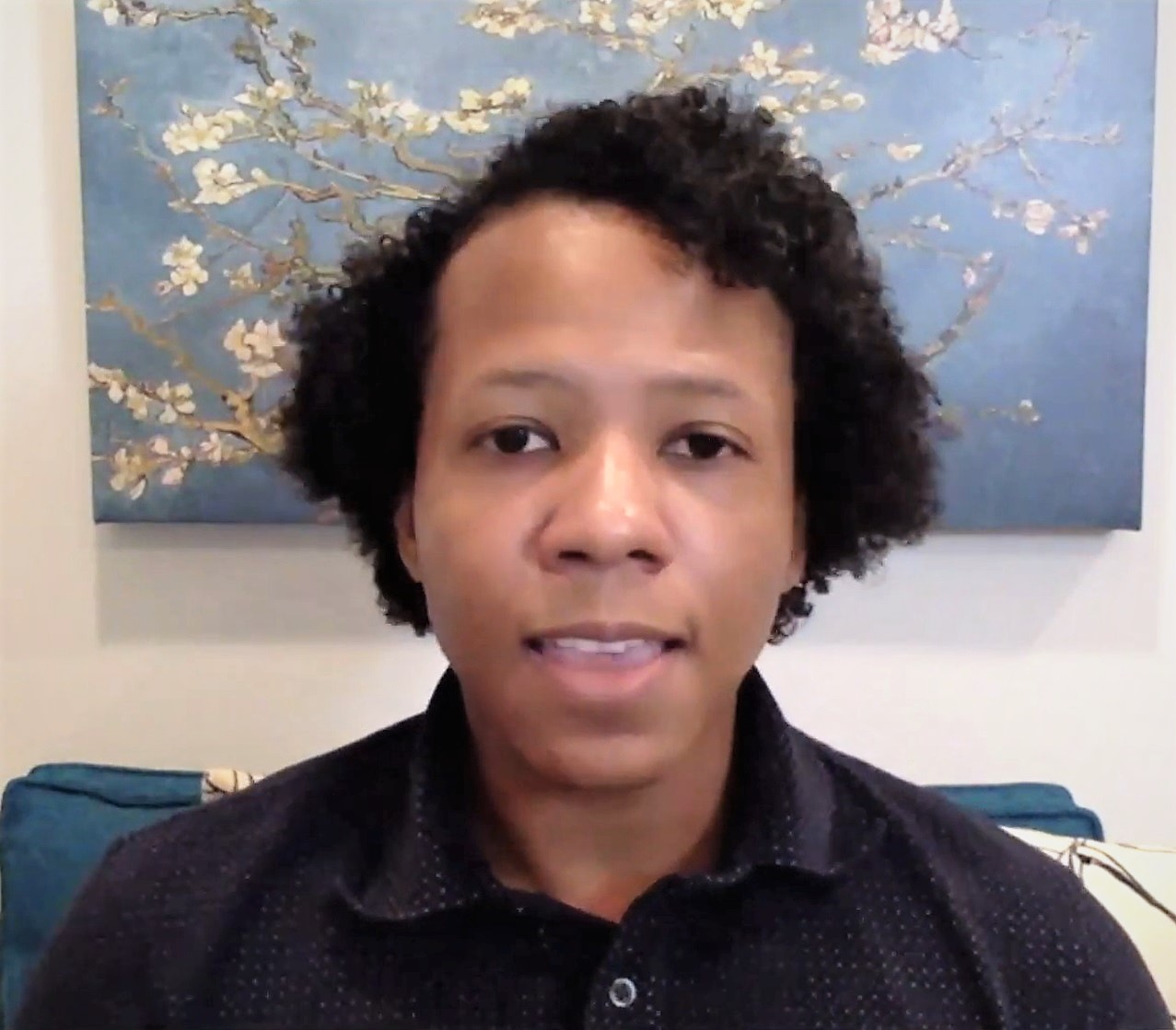
- Callender reads for the National Book Foundation in 2020
- Born: September 19, 1989 (age 37); St. Thomas, U.S. Virgin Islands
- Education: Sarah Lawrence College (BA); The New School (MFA)
- Occupation: Writer
- Writing career
- Language: English
- Years active: 2018–present
- Notable works: Queen of the Conquered; Hurricane Child; King and the Dragonflies; Felix Ever After
- Notable awards: Stonewall Book Award; Lambda Literary Award; National Book Award for Young People's Literature
- Website: kacencallender.com

Kacen Callender (born September 19, 1989) is a Saint Thomian author of children's fiction and fantasy, best known for their Stonewall Book Award and Lambda Literary Award—winning middle grade debut Hurricane Child (2018). Their fantasy novel, Queen of the Conquered, is the 2020 winner of the World Fantasy Award, and King and the Dragonflies won the 2020 National Book Award for Young People's Literature and the 2021 Lambda Literary Award for Children's and Young Adult Literature.

== Personal life ==
Callender was born in 1989 and raised in Saint Thomas, U.S. Virgin Islands. Callender has a bachelor's degree from Sarah Lawrence College in Japanese and Creative Writing and a MFA from The New School's Writing for Children program.

Prior to becoming an author, Callender was an editor at Little, Brown Book Group. In 2018, in reaction to Hurricane Irma, Callender launched the online auction #USVIPubFund, under which they and other book publishing professionals raised $104,000 to support the U.S. Virgin Islands.

Callender is Black, queer, trans, and uses they/them and he/him pronouns. Callender debuted their new name when announcing their next young adult novel Felix Ever After in May 2019.

== Critical reception ==
Their debut novel, Hurricane Child, about a twelve-year-old born during a hurricane who believes herself to be cursed, was published by Scholastic in 2018 and received the Stonewall Book Award in 2019.

Both Hurricane Child and Callender's young adult debut, This Is Kind of an Epic Love Story, were nominated for a 2019 Lambda Literary Award for Children's / Young Adult Literature. Hurricane Child went on to win the award.

Their second young adult novel, Felix Ever After, is about a transgender teen who catfishes a classmate for revenge and ends up falling for him. Felix Ever After was published with Balzer + Bray in 2020 and sold together with This Is Kind of an Epic Love Story in November 2017.

King and the Dragonflies, Callender's second middle-grade novel that explores race and sexuality, was published in 2020. It received a starred review from School Library Journal, Horn Book, and Publishers Weekly.

Their adult debut, Queen of the Conquered, was published by Orbit in 2019. It is set in a Caribbean-inspired fantasy world and tells the story of a biracial black woman who fights to retain power in a society that loathes the idea of her. It received starred reviews from Kirkus Reviews and School Library Journal.

King and the Dragonflies was named the winner of the Lambda Literary Award for Children's and Young Adult Literature at the 33rd Lambda Literary Awards in 2021.

== Awards ==
Year	Work	Award	Category	Result	Ref.
2019	Hurricane Child	Stonewall Book Award	Children's and Young Adult	Won	
2019	Hurricane Child	Lambda Literary Award	Children's and Young Adult Literature	Won	
2019	This Is Kind of an Epic Love Story	Lambda Literary Award	Children's and Young Adult Literature	Shortlisted	
2020	King and the Dragonflies	National Book Award	Young People's Literature	Won	
2020	Queen of the Conquered	World Fantasy Award	Novel	Won	
2021	Felix Ever After	Stonewall Book Award	Children's and Young Adult	Won	
2021	King and the Dragonflies	Coretta Scott King Award	—	Honor	
2021	King and the Dragonflies	Lambda Literary Award	Children's and Young Adult Literature	Won	
2021	King and the Dragonflies	Walter Dean Myers Award	—	Honor	

== Bibliography ==
=== Middle Grade ===
- —— (2018). Hurricane Child (hardcover ed.). Scholastic. pp. 1–214. ISBN 978-1338129304.
- —— (2020). King and the Dragonflies (hardcover ed.). Scholastic Press. pp. 1–272. ISBN 978-1338129335.
- —— (2022). Moonflower (hardcover ed.). Scholastic Inc. pp. 1–272. ISBN 978-1338636598.

=== Young Adult ===
- —— (2018). This Is Kind of an Epic Love Story (hardcover ed.). Balzer & Bray. pp. 1–290. ISBN 978-0062820228.
- —— (2020). Felix Ever After (hardcover ed.). Balzer & Bray. pp. 1–368. ISBN 978-0062820259.
- —— (2022). Lark & Kasim Start a Revolution (hardcover ed.). Amulet Books. pp. 1–336. ISBN 978-1419756870.
- —— (2023). Stars in Your Eyes (hardcover ed.). Forever Publishing. pp. 1–352. ISBN 978-1538726037.
- —— (2024). Infinity Alchemist (hardcover ed.). Tor Teen. pp. 1–400. ISBN 978-1250890252.
- ___ (2025). Chaos King. Faber & Faber. pp 1-384. ISBN 0571383874, 9780571383870

=== Adult Fantasy ===
==== Islands of Blood and Storm Series ====
1. —— (2019). Queen of the Conquered (hardcover ed.). Orbit. pp. 1–400. ISBN 978-0316454933.
2. —— (2020). King of the Rising (paperback ed.). Orbit. pp. 1–384. ISBN 978-0316454940.

=== Audio Novella ===
- —— (2021). Sunset Springs (audiobook ed.). Audible Originals. ASIN B094Q2LSCF.
