= Gayle E. Pitman =

American children's book author

Gayle E. Pitman is an American academic, psychologist, and children's book author. Her debut children's book, This Day in June, was one of the most banned and challenged books of its time in the United States. Pitman also taught psychology and women/gender studies at Sacramento City College. She served as the Dean in the Department of Planning, Research & Institutional Effectiveness, and is currently the Vice President of Institutional Equity, Effectiveness, and Success at Hartnell College.

Pitman grew up in New Jersey and moved to the San Francisco Bay Area in the early 1990s. Pitman received her Doctor of Philosophy degree from the California School of Professional Psychology at Alameda. In 1998: her dissertation looked at the relationship between body dissatisfaction and internalized homophobia in lesbians. In 2001, she moved to Sacramento.

== Publications ==
=== Children's literature ===
- Evelyn Hooker and the Fairy Project with Sarah Green (Illustrations). Expected publication: October 25, 2021 by Magination Press.
- My Maddy with Anne Passchier (Contributor). Published May 25, 2020 by Magination Press.
- The Stonewall Riots: Coming Out in the Streets. Published May 14, 2019 by Abrams Books for Young Readers.
- Sewing the Rainbow: The Story of Gilbert Baker and the Rainbow Flag with Holly Clifton-Brown (Illustrator). Published June 4, 2018 by Magination Press.
- A Church for All with Laure Fournier (Illustrator). Published April 1, 2018 by Albert Whitman & Company.
- Feminism from A to Z. Published October 23, 2017 by Magination Press.
- When You Look Out the Window: How Phyllis Lyon and Del Martin Built a Community with Christopher Lyles (Illustrator). Published June 5, 2017 by Magination Press.
- This Day in June with Kristyna Litten (Illustrator). Published May 5, 2014 by Magination Press.
  - Top 100 Banned and Challenged Books in the USA: 2010-2019 (42)
  - Top 11 Most Challenged Books in the USA (2018)
  - Stonewall Book Awards - Mike Morgan & Larry Romans Children's & Young Adult Literature Award (2015)
  - Rainbow Project Book List (2015)
  - American Library Association Top Ten Choices (2015)
  - Notable Books for a Global Society Awards (2015)
  - Named the single most important must-read book of the last decade (2014)

=== Academic publications ===
- Backdrop: The Politics and Personalities Behind Sexual Orientation Research. Published August 10, 2011 by Active Voice Press.
