= Beyond the Red =

Young adult novels by Gabe Cole Novoa

The Beyond the Red trilogy
- First edition cover of the first book
- Beyond the Red; Into the Black; The Rising Gold
- Author: Gabe Cole Novoa (as Ava Jae)
- Country: United States
- Language: English
- Genre: Science fiction, dystopian, young adult
- Publisher: Sky Pony Press
- Published: March 1, 2016; November 14, 2017; October 2, 2018
- Media type: Hardcover, paperback, e-book, audiobook
- No. of books: 3
- Website: Author's page; Simon & Schuster page

The Beyond the Red trilogy is a series of young adult dystopian science fiction novels by Gabe Cole Novoa, writing under the pen name Ava Jae. Set on a planet where humans and a humanoid native species are in violent conflict, the books include action, forbidden romance, political intrigue, and queer themes.

Beyond the Red is Novoa's debut novel and was written while he was in college. The story, which follows a half-human who finds himself caught in the middle of two cultures, was informed by Novoa's experiences as a white-passing Latinx person. The book was released in 2016 and received critical praise for its worldbuilding. It was followed by the sequels Into the Black (2017) and The Rising Gold (2018).

== Plot ==
On the fictional exoplanet of Safara, humans are second-class citizens, ruled over by a humanoid native species: the tall, tattooed Sepharon. The novels are written in first person, and switch back and forth between the perspectives of Kora and Eros. Kora is a young Sepharon, and the first female ruler of her province of Elja. Eros is a young half-human, half-Sepharon soldier who has grown up with nomadic "redblood" humans in a world where "half-breeds" like him are generally killed at birth.

=== Beyond the Red ===
After much of Eros's family and camp is killed in a Sepharon raid, Eros is captured and becomes Kora's personal servant and bodyguard. Even though Kora ordered the raid, the two find themselves developing feelings for each other, and Kora becomes increasingly sympathetic to the humans' cause.

Kora and Eros must contend with a coup by Kora's more militant brother Dima, who frames Kora for attempted murder and forces them to flee the province. They go beyond the red sands of their native region to the white-sanded capital city of Asheron. Kora's and Eros's feelings intensify, but Kora dithers on whether she wants a relationship with Eros, which leaves Eros feeling heartbroken.

Kora and Eros learn that Eros is actually the descendant of the previous Sira (the ruler of the planet), and that Eros is the rightful heir to the throne. They also learn that Roma, the current Sira, intends to wipe out all of humanity in a genocidal nanite attack. With the help of Roma's good-natured brother Serek, they are able to thwart Roma's plan and disable the world's nanites, but not before many humans die. In a climactic fight, Roma winds up in a permanent coma and Serek receives a fatal blow. In his dying moments, Serek announces to the world that Eros is heir to the throne.

=== Into the Black ===
An emergency council is called. Former rulers from all over the planet meet in the capital city of Asheron, to determine whether a half-human can be permitted to become the next Sira. A DNA test confirms that Eros is the son of former Sira Asha, and Eros also has the golden eyes that mark the royal line. But Lejv, a cousin of Asha's, also vies for the position. Eros fears if the council does not recognize him as Sira, he will be executed, along with his blind and orphaned human nephew Mal, whom Eros has been looking after. Eros finds an ally in Deimos, a charismatic gay Sepharon bounty hunter and member of a royal family, and the two develop a flirtatious relationship.

Kora, meanwhile, learns that her region is in chaos and that her people are revolting against her draconian brother. She returns to Elja, her homeland, and convinces her brother to give power back to her, and forgives him for the coup that deposed her. To appease the people, she asks them to elect a populist representative who will work with her, and they pick a man named Uljen.

Back at the capital, it is determined that Eros and Lejv must fight to the death for the role of Sira. Before the fight, Eros is jumped by anonymous attackers, who break his ribs and send him into a starry, black unconsciousness. He survives, and the council determines that the fight will continue, even though Eros is injured. Eros is ultimately able to subdue Lejv, but decides not to finish him with a killing blow. As Eros broke the rules of the match, the council seems poised to rule that Lejv should become the next Sira. But Eros finds a hidden message in a royal ring from the former Sira Asha, and in the message, Asha confirms that he wanted Eros to be the next-in-line. This is enough to sway the council to grudgingly grant Eros the title.

=== The Rising Gold ===
Eros now rules the planet, and he must contend with the Remnant: a violent group of human activists led by Eros's ruthless biological mother Rani. As one of his first acts as Sira, Eros makes it illegal to enslave humans. But Rani and the Remnant demand more: they want the monarchy abolished and a democratic system put in place.

Meanwhile, Deimos has become both Eros's top advisor and his boyfriend. As Eros has little sexual experience, and none with other men, the two take the relationship slowly. When Deimos catches an embarrassed Eros looking at gay pornography for research, the two become sexual with each other for the first time.

In her home territory of Ejos, Kora also develops a sexual relationship with her advisor Uljen. Meanwhile, Kora's twin brother Dima is tried for his various crimes and sentenced to death. Kora, who still loves her brother, is devastated. When she learns that Dima is escaping the city with the help of his boyfriend and former advisor Jarek, she chooses not to intervene.

In the capital city, the Remnant unleash a biological weapon: many Sepharon are infected with a deadly virus that humans (and half-humans like Eros) are immune to. The Remnant also kidnaps Eros's nephew Mal. Eros, Deimos, and a team of bodyguards are able to track down Mal and rescue him, and a team of Asheron scientists are able to develop a cure for the virus. Eros meets with Rani and negotiates a peace: he doesn't agree to abolish the monarchy, but does agree to a formation of a democratic human advisory council.

The future for humans seems brighter, but many humans still feel unwelcome on the planet, and, at Mal's suggestion, Eros offers them an option: he has his team of scientists restore the massive, ancient spaceship that humans arrived on the planet on many generations ago. Eros announces that humans who want to can board the ship and return to earth. To Eros's surprise, Mal decides he wants to join the expedition. Eros and Deimos hold hands and watch as the spaceship departs: a rising gold streak in the sky.

== Development ==
Novoa wrote the trilogy while a student in college and graduate school. In an interview, he said he took inspiration from the authors Ted Dekker, Tahereh Mafi, and Beth Revis. On his vlog, he said that Beyond the Red was the tenth book he wrote, but the first to be accepted for publication. In 2013, he won representation from Louise Fury, a literary agent then with The Bent Agency, by submitting an excerpt of Beyond the Red to an internet contest; this ultimately led to the book being published in 2016.

== Themes ==
Novoa is described in an author's blurb as "a Latinx trans masculine author who writes speculative fiction featuring marginalized characters grappling with identity." In an article for Latinxs in Kids' Lit, Novoa wrote that his experience as a white-passing Latinx person informed the story, which involves a half-human caught between two different cultures.

The diversity of the characters in the books has been noted, with Kirkus Reviews saying that "Humans and Sepharons alike come in varying shades of brown to pale" and that Eros is queer. On Twitter, Novoa noted that the books get "increasingly queer" as they go along.

== Language ==
Novoa developed an alien vocabulary for the books. A partial glossary:

- Sira: ruler of the planet
- Avra: ruler of a province
- kaï: prince
- Kala: God
- or'jiva: hello
- lijara: queer person
- sha: yes
- kafra: an expletive
- blazing: mild expletive
- brainblaze: serious headache

== Publication ==
First edition covers of the three books

=== History ===
- Beyond the Red
  - March 1, 2016: hardcover (ISBN 978-1-63450-644-1), e-book (ISBN 978-1-63450-645-8).
  - July 31, 2017: digital audiobook.
  - August 29, 2017: CD audiobook.
  - October 31, 2017: paperback (ISBN 978-1-51072-240-8).
- Into the Black
  - November 14, 2017: hardcover (ISBN 978-1-51072-236-1), e-book (ISBN 978-151072-237-8).
  - September 25, 2018: paperback (ISBN 978-1-51073-866-9).
- The Rising Gold
  - October 2, 2018: hardcover (ISBN 978-1-5107-2238-5), e-book (ISBN 978-1-5107-2239-2).
  - October 15, 2019: Paperback (ISBN 978-1-5107-4244-4).

=== Details ===
The audiobook of the first novel was performed by Caitlin Davies and Will Damron and produced by Brilliance Audio.

The paper and e-book versions of the novels were published by Sky Pony Press, an imprint of Skyhorse Publishing. The cover for the first book was designed by Sarah Brody, the second by Sammy Yeun, and the third by Kate Gartner.

The first two books are recommended for ages 12–18 and the third book for ages 14–18.

== Reception ==
Of the first book, Publishers Weekly said Novoa's "smooth worldbuilding and solid pacing make this a highly readable SF romance" but complained that the romantic attraction between Eros and Kora was "hard to believe, considering that Kora is responsible for the death of Eros's family." Booklist said Novoa "spins a cinematic tale of forbidden love and Machiavellian politics. With detailed history, architecture, customs, inventions, and landscape, [Novoa] creates a fascinating new world to explore." The School Library Journal called it "an engaging and amusing read," but said "the concepts and characters are not fully developed." Study Breaks listed the first book as one of "5 YA Books By Hispanic Authors To Read During National Hispanic Heritage Month", and said "it starts big and stays strong throughout."

Meanwhile, Kirkus Reviews called the first book "deeply flawed", and complained of "pacing issues, plot holes, and flat secondary characters", but said the second book was "an improvement on the first outing" and that the third book was "dramatically improved over previous entries".

The books' alien vocabulary has been both praised and criticized. The School Library Journal indicated that the language was part of what made the books' world "beautifully conceived...with unique details", but Kirkus Reviews complained about "the inaccessible and forced jargon".

Following the success of the Beyond the Red series, Novoa's following published works reached higher critical acclaim, with 2023's The Wicked Bargain being a finalist in the young adult category of the Lambda Literacy Award for Children and Young Adult Literature.
