= Robyn Gigl =

American lawyer, writer, and LGBTQ+ activist (b. 1952)

Robyn Gigl (born 1952) is an American lawyer, writer, and LGBTQ+ activist. She is author of a series of legal thrillers centered on transgender lawyer Erin McCabe, including the novels By Way of Sorrow (2021), Survivor's Guilt (2022), Remain Silent (2023), and Nothing but the Truth (2024).

== Personal life and legal career ==
Gigl was born into a middle-class family in 1952. A litigation specialist based in New Jersey, Gigl has worked in commercial and employment law, alongside some criminal defense work, since the late 1970s. Gigl is a trans woman, and she was in a marriage with another woman and had three children before starting her gender transition. In 2006, she became managing partner of the law firm she joined in the 1980s, and she started her transition three years later. She joined Gluck Walrath in 2015, which later merged with Dilworth Paxson.

Among other work, Gigl and the American Civil Liberties Union of New Jersey represented the plaintiff in Sonia Doe v. NJ Department of Corrections, in which Sonia Doe, a trans woman, challenged her placement into men's prisons. As part of the settlement in 2021, the Department of Corrections adopted a new prison placement policy based on gender identity. Gigl is part of the state's Transgender Equality Task Force and the state supreme court's Committee on Diversity, Inclusion and Community Engagement. The New Jersey Law Journal named her one of the "Top Women in Law" in 2020.

== Writing ==
Always intending to become a novelist, Gigl started a manuscript in 1979 that she was never able to complete. She returned to writing when encouraged to participate in the 2010 National Novel Writing Month by her son, Colin, who also went on to publish his own novel with Simon & Schuster. Although she was able to complete a manuscript and obtain an agent, she was not able to have the work published. During that time, she developed what would become her first book, By Way of Sorrow, a legal thriller with transgender lawyer Erin McCabe as its protagonist. She and her agent signed a deal with Kensington Publishing in late 2018 for its publication as well as a second novel. By Way of Sorrow was published in 2021. Sarah Weinman in The New York Times described the novel as "quietly groundbreaking".

Before the publication of her second novel, Survivor's Guilt (2022), Gigl signed a deal with her publisher to continue the series. Remain Silent followed in 2023. A fourth novel, Nothing but the Truth, was published in 2024. Survivor's Guilt won the Joseph Hansen Award for LGBTQ Crime Writing at the 2023 Triangle Awards for LGBT literature and it was named by Time magazine as one of "The 100 Best Mystery and Thriller Books of All Time", alongside such authors as Stephen King. Gigl's third novel, Remain Silent, was a finalist for the Joseph Hansen Award for LGBTQ Crime Writing.

On the relation between her writing and her LGBTQ+ activism, Gigl told the New Jersey Law Journal in 2023: "I don't want to preach to people with my novels. What activism is about is to try to help people understand an issue that maybe they're not familiar with. And when they put a human face on it, and they see the human side of it, it changes their understanding of the issue."

== Bibliography ==
- Gigl, Robyn (2021). By Way of Sorrow. Kensington. ISBN 978-1-4967-2826-5.
- —— (2022). Survivor's Guilt. Kensington. ISBN 978-1-4967-2828-9.
- —— (2023). Remain Silent. Kensington. ISBN 978-1-4967-4176-9.
- —— (2024). Nothing But the Truth. New York: Kensington. ISBN 978-1-4967-4179-0.
