= Ron Riley =

Ron Riley may refer to:

- Ronald Riley (born 1947), Australian retired Olympic field hockey player
- Ron Riley (basketball, born 1950), American former NBA- and college basketball player
- Ron Riley (basketball, born 1973), American former CBA-, PBA-, and ABA player
- Ron Riley (ice hockey) (born 1948), Canadian former WHA player
