= Hurricane Child =

2018 novel by Kacen Callender

- Author: Kacen Callender
- Language: English
- Genre: Middle Grade fiction
- Publisher: Scholastic Press
- Publication date: 27 March 2018
- Pages: 240
- Awards: Stonewall Book Award; Lambda Literary Award
- ISBN: 978-1-3381-2930-4

Hurricane Child is a children's novel by Kacen Callender. The book was published in March 2018 by Scholastic Press. The book is set in Saint Thomas, U.S. Virgin Islands, and tells the story of Caroline Murphy, who discovers her love for another girl.

The book was received positively by critics, and was praised for its vivid description of the Caribbean islands as well as for its use of present tense for the main character. Hurricane Child received the Stonewall Book Award and the Lambda Literary Award in 2019.

== Plot ==
Caroline Murphy, a girl that lives on an island near Saint Thomas, believes herself to be cursed. She was born during a hurricane, a sign of bad luck, and is haunted by the spirit of an unknown woman. Murphy goes to a Catholic school, where she is bullied by students and faculty alike, due to the color of her skin. Her mother also abandoned the family without apparent reason and disappeared.

One day, a girl called Kalinda, from Barbados, is transferred to Murphy's school. Kalinda eventually develops a friendship with Caroline after Caroline asks Kalinda to sit with her. Murphy slowly realizes she has a crush on Kalinda.

== Analysis ==
According to literary Professor Stephanie Rambo, Kacen Callender explores the experiences of young, queer, and black children coming into adolescence in their book, Hurricane Child. Rambo notes that while adolescence can be characterized as a tumultuous time in a young person's life, Callender focuses on the possibilities and hope that adolescence can bring as young people begin to find who they are and how they fit within the context of their community. Rambo remarks that Callender uses storms throughout the story to conceptualize the tumultuousness of adolescence and the new beginnings that come after the storm, both metaphorically and literally.

Giselle Anatol, a specialist in Caribbean literature, comments that Hurricane Child explores themes of queerness through the lens of a young black main character who finds herself ostracized by her community. Anatol notes that while the book primarily focuses on the struggles of being queer, Callender also provides commentary on themes of modern colonialism in the US Virgin Islands. Anatol describes Callender's use of a ghost to help disrupt the storyline of Hurricane Child as a ‘physical’ manifestation of the lingering haunts of imperialism in Caribbean communities. Anatol writes that Callender dismantles the typical notions of the Gothic Genre by adapting what it means to be haunted. Anatol also compares Hurricane Child to Annie John by Jamaica Kincaid in Callender's use of a ghostly entity to explore themes of community within the Caribbean context.

== Reception ==
The book was generally well-received, with the use of the present tense in the main character's narration a common praise among critics. Writing for The Horn Book Magazine, Anastasia Collins praised the use of present tense as a technique that "thoroughly immerses readers in an emotional tempest." Collins also highlighted Callender's description of Caribbean life and culture, both in "the cruel reality of prejudice" as well as "the fragility and resilience of inner strength."

Melanie Kirkwood noted that the concept of "[l]ove, whether familial, amiable, or romantic, is an unmistakable driving force" in the book. Kirkwood also commented on the romantic relationship that is developed between two of the main adolescent characters, which is used to portray "the societal and religious pressures against such connections."

Kirkus Reviews, which gave the book their "Get It" verdict, also commented on the author's usage of present tense as a way to make readers identify with Caroline's emotions, both positive and negative. Jennifer Barnes, for The Booklist, said "Callender's novel captures the exquisite agony and pain that accompany rejection and abandonment", as well as praising the detailed description of the region.

Hurricane Child was the recipient of the Stonewall Book Award and the Lambda Literary Award, both in 2019 and in the Children's and Young Adult category.

== Censorship ==
In late 2019, Hurricane Child was one of several books banned throughout Louden County elementary schools due to the presence of LGBTQ characters; however, the ban of Hurricane Child was later reversed in early 2020. In 2023, Hurricane Child was also banned from Woodlawn Elementary School located in Danville, Kentucky.
