= We Are the Youth (art project) =

LGBT art project

We Are The Youth is a project attempting to capture stories of LGBT youth in America through photography. This project was started by Diana Scholl and Laurel Golio in 2010, when they photographed a PFLAG Gay Prom. Photos from We Are The Youth are available as an online archive of LGBT youth on their website as well as in book form in We Are the Youth: Sharing the Stories of LGBTQ Youth in the United States, which received a top ten spot on the American Library Association Rainbow Book List in 2015. Work from the project has also been displayed at the Silver Eye Center for Photography in Pittsburgh in 2014 and at the Leslie-Lohman Museum of Art in New York in 2012.

People photographed as part of the project range in age from 12 to 21.
