= Eliot Schrefer =

American and British author

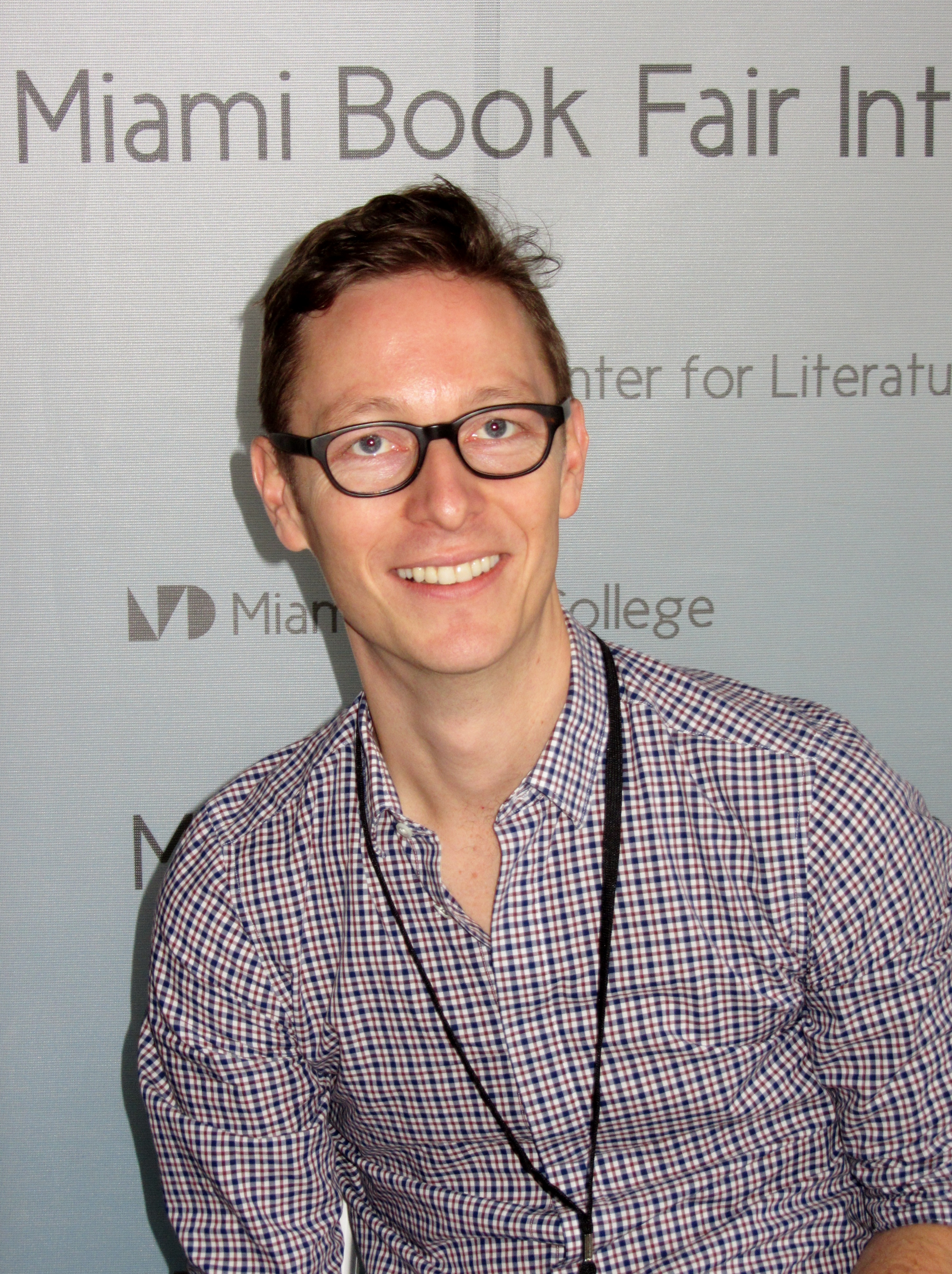
- Schrefer at the Miami Book Fair International, 2014
- Born: November 25, 1978 (age 47); Chicago, Illinois, U.S.
- Education: B.A. with Highest Honors in Literature
- Alma mater: Harvard University
- Occupations: Writer, teacher
- Writing career
- Notable works: Endangered, Threatened
- Notable awards: National Book Award Finalist 2012, 2014; Sigurd Olson Nature Writing Award 2013; Green Earth Book Award 2013
- Website: www.eliotschrefer.com

Eliot Schrefer (born November 25, 1978) is an American and British author of both adult and young adult fiction, and a two-time finalist for the National Book Award in Young People's Literature. Schrefer's first novel Glamorous Disasters was published by Simon & Schuster in 2006. He is most known for his young adult novels Endangered (2012) and Threatened (2014), which are survival stories featuring young people and great apes. He is currently on the faculty of the Creative Writing MFA Program at Fairleigh Dickinson University.

== Career ==
In reviewing his novel Endangered, The New York Times praised the depth of his characters, saying "As riveting as the action is, it’s the nuanced portraits of the characters, human and ape, that make the story so deeply affecting." Dennis Abrams of Publishing Perspectives, also discussed in his review of Threatened, the way in which Schrefer "even makes his chimpanzees ... into living breathing characters."

In drawing parallels between the bonobo apes and human characters in these novels, Schrefer says that writing about the bonobos "allowed me to address more nakedly the feelings—jealousy, loyalty, anger, sorrow—that we all experience."

Schrefer withdrew from the 2021 Plum Creek Literacy Festival at Concordia University Nebraska after observing that books with LGBT characters, including his book The Darkness Outside Us, had been excluded from the festival and that the religious University had a discriminatory policy toward LGBT students. Other authors withdrew following Schrefer, and the festival was cancelled.

The Darkness Outside Us, an LGBT young adult science fiction novel by Schrefer, was published in 2021 by Harper Collins. In 2024, Elliot Page's production company Page Boy Productions optioned the rights to adapting the novel.

== Personal life ==
Born in Chicago to a British mother and an American father, Schrefer is gay.

== List of works ==
=== The Ape Quartet ===
- Endangered (Scholastic, 2012)
- Threatened (Scholastic, 2014)
- Rescued (Scholastic, 2016)
- Orphaned (Scholastic, September 25, 2018)

=== The Lost Rainforest ===
- Mez's Magic (Katherine Tegen Books, January 2, 2018)
- Gogi's Gambit (Jaden Tegen Books, February 5, 2019)
- Rumi's Riddle (Katherine Tegen Books, February 4, 2020)

=== Spirit Animals ===
- Spirit Animals book 6: Rise and Fall (Scholastic, 2014)
- Spirit Animals (Fall of the Beasts) book 1: Immortal Guardians (Scholastic, 2015)

=== Other work ===
- Glamorous Disasters (Simon & Schuster, 2006)
- The New Kid (Simon & Schuster, 2007)
- Hack the SAT (Gotham Books, 2008)
- The School for Dangerous Girls (Scholastic, 2009)
- The Deadly Sister (Scholastic, 2010)
- Greek Fantasy Novel (Scholastic, 2011)
- The Darkness Outside Us (Harper Collins, 2021)
- Queer Ducks (and Other Animals) (Harper Collins, 2022)
- Charming Young Man (Harper Collins, 2023)
- The Brightness Between Us (Harper Collins, 2024)
