= Natasha Ngan =

English fiction writer

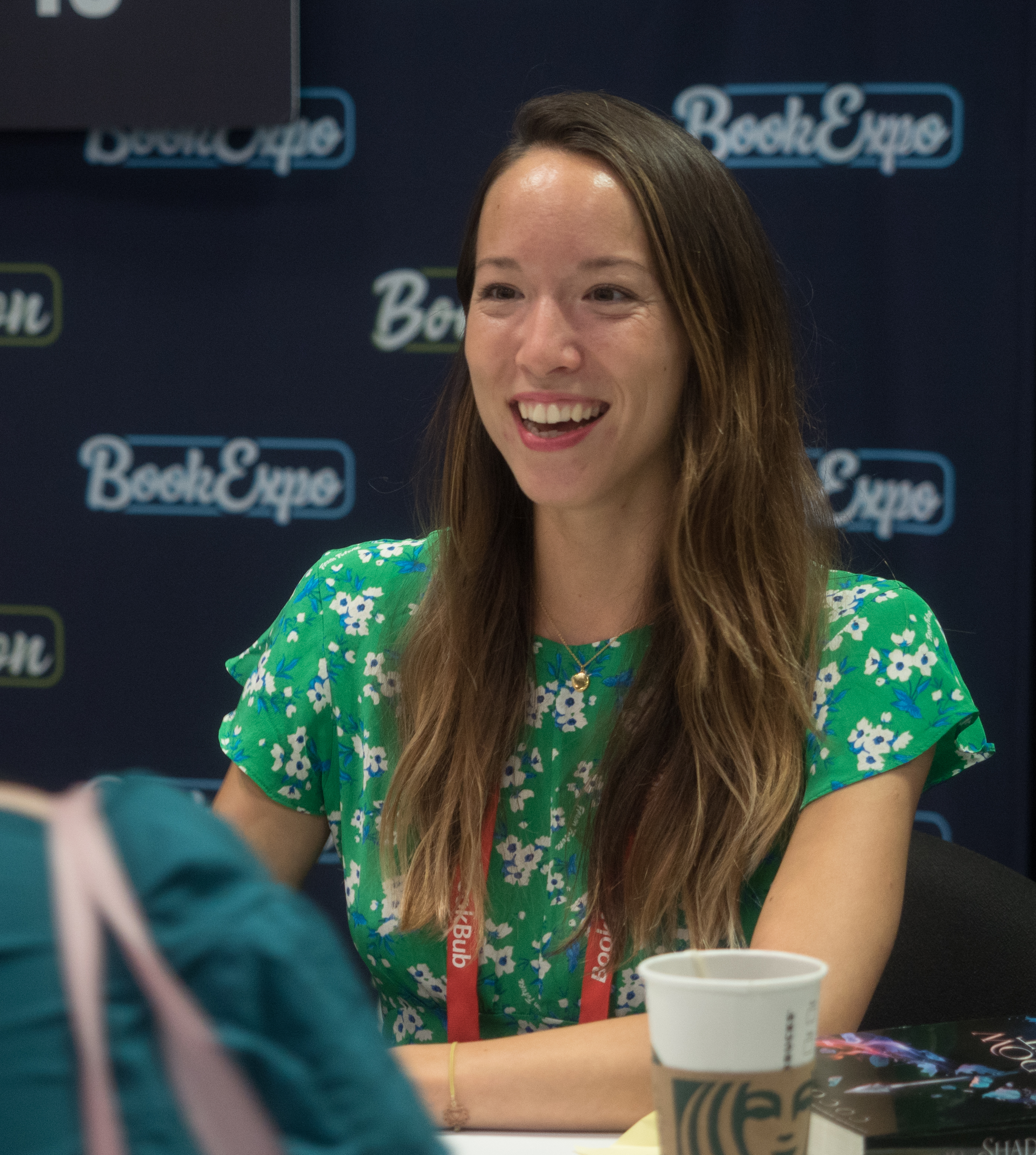
- Ngan at the 2019 BookExpo
- Born: 1990 (age 35–36); St Albans, England
- Education: Jesus College, Cambridge
- Writing career
- Years active: 2013–present
- Genres: Young adult; sci-fi; fantasy; romance
- Notable work: Girls of Paper and Fire trilogy
- Website: natashangan.com

Natasha Ngan (born 1990) is an English writer of adult and young adult fiction. She is best known for her New York Times bestselling young adult fantasy series Girls of Paper and Fire.

== Personal life ==
Ngan was born in St Albans, Hertfordshire to an English father and a Chinese-Malaysian mother. She spent some of her childhood in Malaysia. Ngan says her multicultural upbringing contributed to her wanting to write diverse stories. Having been interested in intercultural relations from a young age, Ngan studied geography at Jesus College, Cambridge, specialising in cultural geography.

During her time at Cambridge, Ngan first developed the idea for what would become her debut novel The Elites. After graduation, she started working for a social media agency in London. Aside from writing, she is also a fashion blogger and teaches yoga.

Her third novel Girls of Paper and Fire is inspired by her Chinese-Malaysian heritage.

She currently lives on the French coast with her partner.

== Career ==
Ngan is represented by Taylor Haggerty at Root Literary.

=== Standalones ===
Her debut novel The Elites was published by Hot Key Books in September 2013, about a teenager who has to protect the city as a warrior because of her genetically superior DNA. Ngan names 2001 book Mortal Engines by Philip Reeve as well as the works of writers Patrick Ness and Paolo Bacigalupi as some of her influences for the novel, due to their "original" and "exotic"-feeling settings.

A second novel, The Memory Keepers, about a futuristic London in which memories are currency, and following a boy who steals memories and sells them on the black market. It was published in 2014, also by Hot Key Books. Ngan had the idea for writing the novel during a family holiday in Seville, where she found herself wishing to be able to bottle up the memories and relive them again and again, a concept which ultimately served as the basis for the premise of the novel.

=== Girls of Paper and Fire series ===
Her third novel, Girls of Paper and Fire, the first in a trilogy of the same name, is set in a world in which a Demon King chooses among eight human concubines and two of them, Lei and Wren, fall for each other. Ngan says the first spark of the story originated from the idea of wanting to write about two courtesans of a demon king who fall for each other instead of for him. The novel tackles topics like sexual assault, homophobia, and the commodification of women's bodies. As a sexual abuse survivor, Ngan states that it was important for her to tackle the topics in a sensible manner, in order to prepare teens for the world and not to shelter them. It was published by Jimmy Patterson Books in November 2018. Girl of Paper and Fire debuted on the New York Times Bestseller list.

The second novel in the series, Girls of Storm and Shadow, picks up right after the events of the first, following Lei and Wren as they travel the kingdom to gain favors from rebel clans after the assassination of the Demon King. Girls of Storm and Shadow was released in November 2019.

The last and final novel, Girls of Fate and Fury, was published in 2021.

== Bibliography ==
=== Girls of Paper and Fire series ===
1. Girls of Paper and Fire (2018)
2. Girls of Storm and Shadow (2019)
3. Girls of Fate and Fury (2021)

=== Standalone ===
- The Elites (2013)
- The Memory Keepers (2014)
