= Poproč =

Poproč can refer to:

- Poproč, a village in the Košice Region (Košice–okolie District) of Slovakia
- Poproč, a village in the Banská Bystrica Region (Rimavská Sobota District) of Slovakia
