= Lou Palazzi =

American football player and official (1921–2007)

No. 57
- Position: Center

Personal information
- Born: June 25, 1921; Groton, Connecticut, U.S.
- Died: January 7, 2007 (aged 85); Dunmore, Pennsylvania, U.S.
- Listed height: 6 ft 0 in (1.83 m)
- Listed weight: 198 lb (90 kg)

Career information
- High school: Dunmore
- College: Penn State (1939–1942)
- NFL draft: 1943: 7th round, 56th overall pick

Career history
- New York Giants (1946–1947)

Career NFL statistics
- Games played: 16
- Stats at Pro Football Reference

Louis Joseph Palazzi (June 25, 1921 – January 7, 2007) was an American professional football player who later officiated from 1952 through 1981 as an umpire in the National Football League (NFL). Palazzi was the umpire in three Super Bowls, IV, VII and XI; worked nine NFL championship games, including 1958 championship game between the Baltimore Colts and the New York Giants; and was assigned to work in the postseason in his final 25 seasons in the league.

== Early life ==
Born in Groton, Connecticut, in 1921, son of the late Augusto and Rose Uguccioni Palazzi, he and his family immediately settled in Pennsylvania, where he was a resident for most of his life. A 1939 graduate of Dunmore High School, he was an all-scholastic center on the football team, was co-captain, and participated in the 1939 Scranton Dream Game.

== College career ==
Palazzi attended Penn State University for the next four years and was a walk-on for the football team. In his junior year, he became the starting center/linebacker. In his senior year, 1942, he was elected team captain and made the Associated Press All-East team.

== Military service ==
After graduating from Penn State with a degree in industrial arts, Palazzi joined the United States Army Air Forces and fought in World War II. During this time, he played football for the Fourth and Fifth Air Force Bombers, teams used to raise money for the war effort. After the war, he received a master's degree from Penn State in industrial engineering and was drafted in the seventh round by the New York Giants.

== Professional career ==
=== Player ===
Palazzi was the starting center for the Giants from 1946 to 1948 and ended his playing career with the Boston Yanks in 1949. After that, Chicago Bears owner George Halas, who tried to get Palazzi to play for him, got him back into the league as an official in 1951.

=== Official ===
In 1952, Palazzi began his career as an NFL umpire, where he remained for the next 30 seasons. Palazzi worked a playoff game for the last 25 years of his tenure, including nine NFL championships, one of which was the 1958 "Greatest Game Ever Played," the Giants/Colts sudden-death championship. He later officiated Super Bowl IV, VII and XI, and was called by the media "the fastest man on the ball." He also was rated as the best foul-weather official in the league. Palazzi, who wore uniform number 51 (later worn by Dale Orem and now by referee Carl Cheffers) for most of his career (except for the 1979–1981 seasons, when officials were numbered separately by position, when he wore number 3 as the NFL's senior umpire), worked the final 11 seasons of his career (1971–81) as the umpire on the crew of referee Bob Frederic after spending 1970 on Bob Finley's crew.

== Late life and death ==
From 1950 to 1958, Palazzi was an industrial arts teacher and assistant football coach at West Scranton High School. He concurrently aided his father in the ancient family gardening business. In 1959, he became a registered landscape architect in Pennsylvania and assumed control of Palazzi Garden Centers and Landscaping, which he operated until his retirement in 1992.

Palazzi died at the Dunmore, Pennsylvania, Health Care Center on January 7, 2007, at the age of 85.
