= Ruth Earnshaw Lo =

American educator (1910–2006)

- Ruth Earnshaw Lo, from a 1938 newspaper.
- Born: Ruth Catherine Ethel Earnshaw; October 12, 1910; Philadelphia, Pennsylvania, United States
- Died: January 12, 2006 (aged 95); Boulder, Colorado, United States
- Other names: Xia Luteh, H'sia Lu-te
- Occupations: Educator, writer
- Notable work: In the Eye of the Typhoon (1980)
- Spouse: Dr Lo Chuanfang
- Relatives: Malinda Lo (granddaughter)

Ruth Earnshaw Lo (October 12, 1910 – January 12, 2006) was an American educator in China. She wrote about her experiences in In the Eye of the Typhoon (1980).

== Early life ==
Ruth Catherine Ethel Earnshaw was born in Philadelphia, the daughter of Col. Arthur Chester Earnshaw and Ethel Kirk Earnshaw. Her father was a military officer; her mother was born in England. She was raised in Dunmore, Pennsylvania. She graduated from the University of Chicago in 1931, with further studies at Columbia University. She traveled to China in 1936, assisting Yale professor George A. Kennedy and studying Chinese.

== Career ==
Lo taught English literature and composition at Huachung University from 1937 to 1953, and at Zhongshan University from 1953. Her husband also taught at both schools. She left China in 1978.

Lo's letters to her parents in Pennsylvania told of Japanese bombings in China in 1938, and about rescuing an American pilot in 1942. In 1939, she made a perilous journey home to Scranton, spoke about her experiences in person through 1940, and had an eventful journal back to China in 1941. She was back in the United States from 1944 to 1946, with her young daughter. The Century Club of Scranton collected food and clothing for Lo to distribute to children in China.

Lo wrote about her family's life during the Cultural Revolution in In the Eye of the Typhoon (1980, with Katharine S. Kinderman). A review in The New York Times called it "an important book that should be read by those who wish to understand the real China and the role that foreigners can play in it." She toured and gave lectures in the United States after the book's publication.

== Personal life ==
Ruth Earnshaw met Lo Chuanfang (John C. F. Lo) at the University of Chicago; they married in 1937. They had two children, son Mingteh (Kirk) and daughter Tientung (Catherine). Lo was widowed when her husband died in 1969, and she died in 2006, aged 95 years, in Boulder, Colorado. A memoir of her time at Huachung is in the Yale Divinity School Library collection. Her brother-in-law Chuan-Hua Gershom Lowe's papers are at Rice University.

Her granddaughter is writer Malinda Lo, who dedicated her novel Ash (2009) to the memory of Ruth Earnshaw Lo.
