= Golo Footwear =

- Industry: Fashion
- Founded: 1915; 111 years ago in Dunmore, Pennsylvania, U.S.
- Founder: Adolf Heilbrunn
- Headquarters: Dunmore, Pennsylvania, U.S.
- Products: Shoes

Golo Footwear is a fashion company that was established in 1915 by the German immigrant Adolf Heilbrunn.

== History ==
The company initially designed and manufactured slippers in Dunmore, Pennsylvania, and was known for experimenting with materials not traditionally used in footwear, such as cork, stretch fabrics, Gore-Tex for rainboots, and clear lucite sandal wedges.

In 2006, there were 22 different examples of Golo boots, shoes, and sandals in the collections of the Metropolitan Museum of Art, including an over-the-knee boot made of different-colored patent leather zip-on layers, stretch patent leather boots designed for Jacques Tiffeau in 1967, and the denim platform boots designed by Leila Larmon and Stephen Bruce. Golo is probably best recognized for the invention of the go-go boot in 1964, which was worn by Barbra Streisand and photographed by Richard Avedon in the August 1965 issue of Vogue.

The Golo brand was bought by Dennis Comeau and relaunched in 2013.
