= Ladislav Štovčík =

Slovak footballer

Ladislav Štovčik
Personal information
- Full name: Ladislav Štovčik
- Date of birth: 13 March 1950 (age 76)
- Place of birth: Poproč, Czechoslovakia
- Positions: Left back; right back

Youth career
- VSS Košice

Senior career*
Years	Team	Apps	(Gls)
1969–1977	VSS Košice	109	(0)
Total		109	(0)

International career
1972–1973	Czechoslovakia U-23	7	(0)
- * Club domestic league appearances and goals

Ladislav Štovčik (born 13 March 1950) is a former Slovak football defender who played professionally only for VSS Košice. He made 109 appearances at the Czechoslovak First League.

Štovčík played seven matches for the Czechoslovakia under-23 team and became the European under-23 champion in 1972.
