= John Willard Raught =

American painter

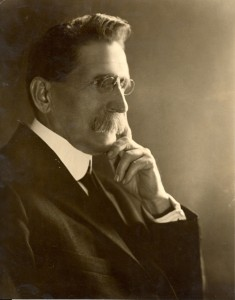
- Born: 9 September 1857; Dunmore, Pennsylvania
- Died: 5 January 1931 (aged 73); Dunmore, Pennsylvania
- Notable work: The Great Road; Brittany in the Paris Salon; Bords de l’Oise
- Movement: Impressionism

John Willard Raught (September 9, 1857 – January 5, 1931) was an American painter; known primarily for his landscapes in the Impressionistic style.

He initially worked as a telegraph operator in Scranton to support his education. At the age of twenty-four, he moved to New York City to enroll at the National Academy of Design. His first exhibit was at the Pennsylvania Academy of the Fine Arts in Philadelphia in 1885.

Upon completing his studies there, he went to Paris, where he studied at the Académie Julian under Gustave Boulanger and Jules Lefebvre. He would remain in Europe for seven years, spending some time at the artists' colony in Pont-Aven and exhibiting at the Salon.

When he returned, he opened a studio in New York and lived there for several years before going back to Dunmore. There, he painted portraits and landscapes, in the hills of North Eastern Pennsylvania. He also created industrial scenes related to the coal industry. He exhibited his landscapes frequently at the National Academy and the Boston Art Club. He was also a member of the Salmagundi Club, a group that included some of the most prominent painters of that time.

His works have been displayed in the Clinton Library. The largest collection of his works is at the Everhart Museum.

== Selected works ==
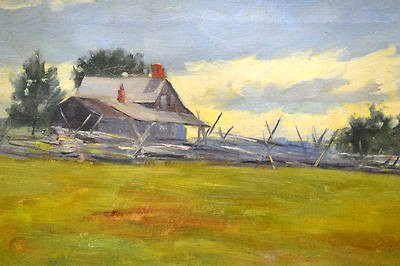
Farm Landscape

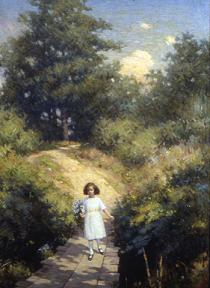
Path in Dunmore

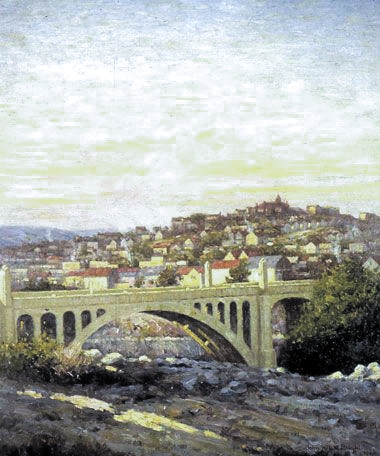
Harrison Avenue Bridge, Scranton

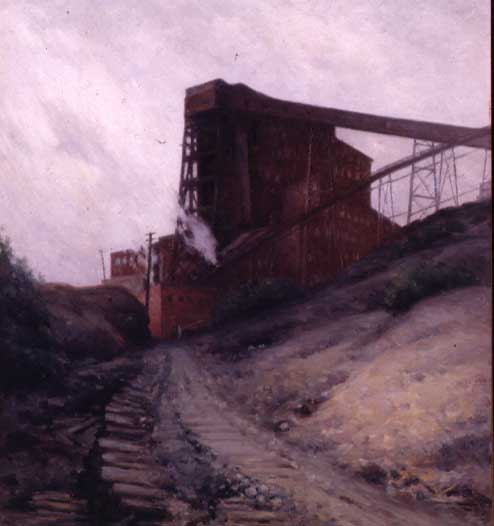
Anthracite Co. Colliery
