= Clare Horan Cawley =

American pianist (1874–1921)

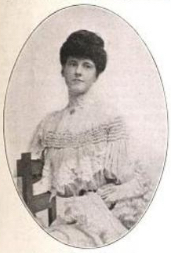
- Clare Horan Cawley, from a 1905 publication.
- Born: Clare Horan; Scranton, Pennsylvania
- Occupation: pianist

Clare Horan Cawley (1874 – December 26, 1921) was an American pianist.

== Early life and education ==
Clare Horan was born in Dunmore, Pennsylvania, the daughter of Patrick J. Horan and Mary A. Garvey Horan. All of her grandparents were born in Ireland. Her father was a businessman, born in Ireland. Her uncle was Eugene A. Garvey, the Roman Catholic bishop of Altoona.

She studied piano in Scranton with Professor E. E. Southworth, before pursuing further training in New York City with Charles Lee Tracy. She also went to study in Paris, with Moritz Moszkowski, and in Vienna, with Marie Prentner and Theodor Leschetizky.

== Career ==
Clare Horan was a pianist and piano teacher in Scranton, after she returned from Vienna in 1901. She gave recitals, was a soloist in concerts of the Scranton Symphony Orchestra, and accompanied Ernestine Schumann-Heink in her 1902 concert there. In widowhood, she reopened her Scranton studio to teach piano.

Polish composer and critic Stanisław Niewiadomski dedicated a composition to Clare Horan in 1901, while she was studying in Vienna.

== Personal life ==
Horan's sister Margaret died soon after childbirth in 1901; Clare Horan married her sister's widower, attorney Matthew P. Cawley, in 1903, and raised her nephew, Eugene Horan Cawley, as her stepson. She was widowed in 1906, and she died from a heart attack at her home in Dunmore, in 1921. Her grave is in the St. Mary's of Mount Carmel Church cemetery in Dunmore. "The funeral was one of the largest in Dunmore in some time," reported the local newspaper's account.
