= John Francis Ropek =

American meteorologist and oceanographer

John Francis Ropek (January 3, 1917 – November 9, 2009) was an American meteorologist and oceanographer.

== Early life and education ==
John Francis Ropek was born in Dunmore, Pennsylvania. His parents were Josephine and Franciszek Ropek. Ropek was an alumnus of Dunmore High School. He earned degrees in chemistry and meteorology from New York University.

== Career ==
During World War II Ropek was drafted and served in the United States Army Air Forces in the Pacific, attaining the rank of captain. He became a civilian researcher after the war. In 1957 he was assigned to the USS Nautilus. As one of 116 men aboard this nuclear submarine, Ropek was involved in pioneering oceanographic studies under the polar ice cap of the North Pole, resulting in the report "Characteristics of Polar Ice Observed During the 1957 Arctic Cruise of the USS Nautilus" (Defense Technical Information Center 1958).

As a scientist he published many technical papers, such as US Navy Hydrographic Office synoptic and prognostic wave charts (US Navy Hydrographic Office 1955), and "An Application of Naval Oceanographic Development to Inland Waters" (Defense Technical Information Center 1967).

Later, Ropek was deputy director of the prediction division of the Naval Oceanographic Office. Late in life he lived in Lusby, Maryland.

John F. Ropek died November 9, 2009, at Calvert Memorial Hospital in Maryland. He was 92.
