= Poproč, Rimavská Sobota District =

Poproč Gömörhegyvég
- Municipality
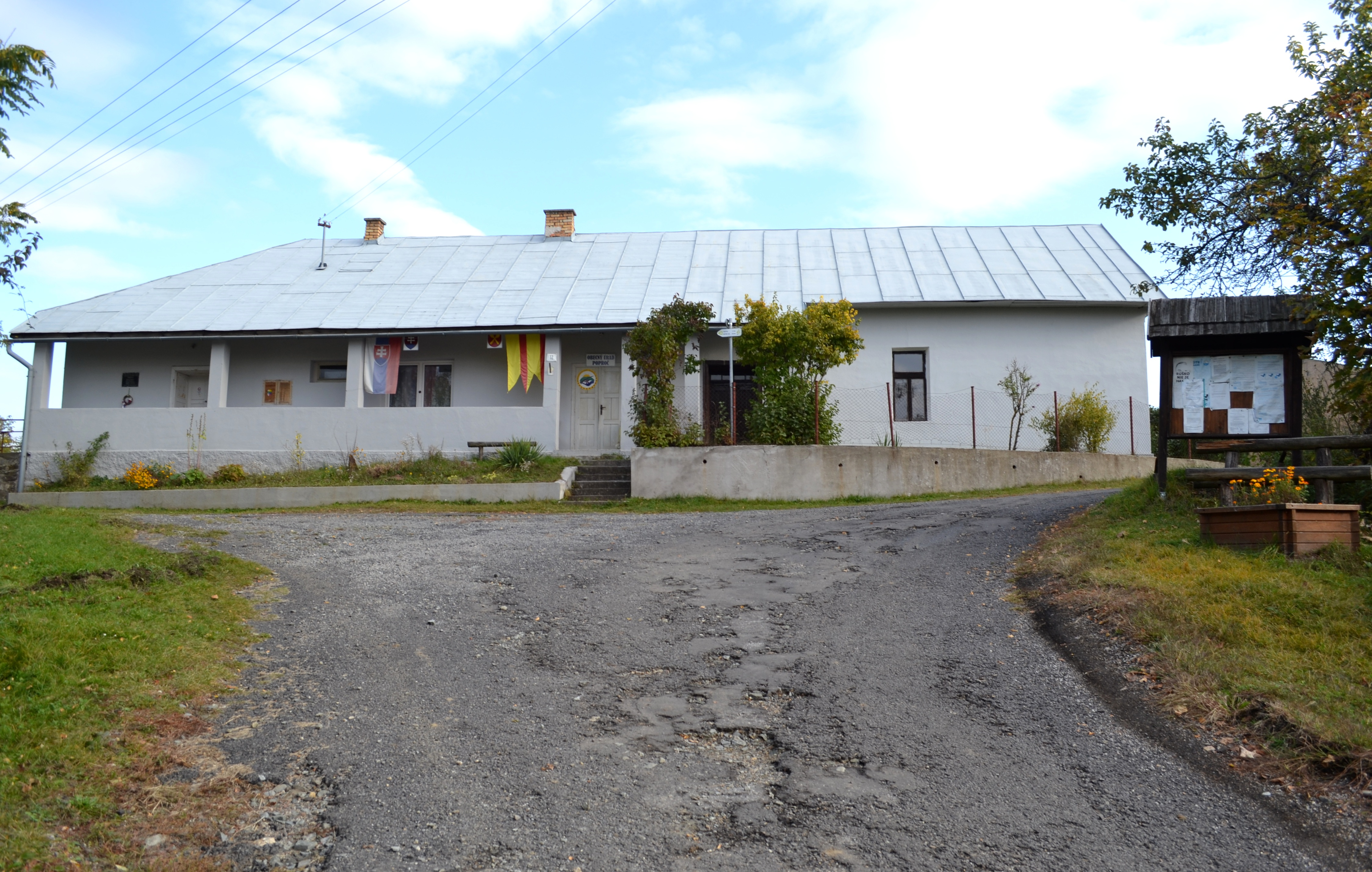

- Flag

- Location of Poproč in the Banská Bystrica Region Location of Poproč in Slovakia
- Coordinates: 48°35′N 20°02′E
- Country: Slovakia
- Region: Banská Bystrica Region
- District: Rimavská Sobota District
- First mentioned: 1413

Area
  - Total: 4.03 km^{2} (1.56 sq mi)
- Elevation: 556 m (1,824 ft)

Population (2025)
  - Total: 32
- Time zone: UTC+1 (CET)
  - Summer (DST): UTC+2 (CEST)
- Postal code: 982 67
- Area code: +421 47
- Vehicle registration plate (until 2022): RS

Poproč (Hungarian: Gömörhegyvég) is a village and municipality in the Rimavská Sobota District of the Banská Bystrica Region of southern Slovakia. In the past locals had been engaged in pasturage and livestock breeding. Together with Červeňany it is the smallest village in Banská Bystrica Region.

== Population ==
Population statistic (10 years)
Year	1995	2005	2015	2025
Count	34	21	25	32
Difference		−38.23%	+19.04%	+28%

Population statistic
Year	2024	2025
Count	23	32
Difference		+39.13%

It has a population of 32 people (31 December 2025).

=== Ethnicity ===
Census 2021 (1+ %)
Ethnicity	Number	Fraction
Slovak	22	95.65%
Hungarian	1	4.34%
Total	23	

In year 2021 was 23 people by ethnicity 22 as Slovak and 1 as Hungarian.

Note on population: The difference values of population numbers in the table "Population statistic" and in the sections "Ethnicity" & "Religion" is caused by the use of various statistical methods.

=== Religion ===
Census 2021 (1+ %)
Religion	Number	Fraction
None	16	69.57%
Evangelical Church	7	30.43%
Total	23	

In year 2021 was 23 people by religion 16 from None and 7 from Evangelical Church.
