= Webster Aitken =

American pianist

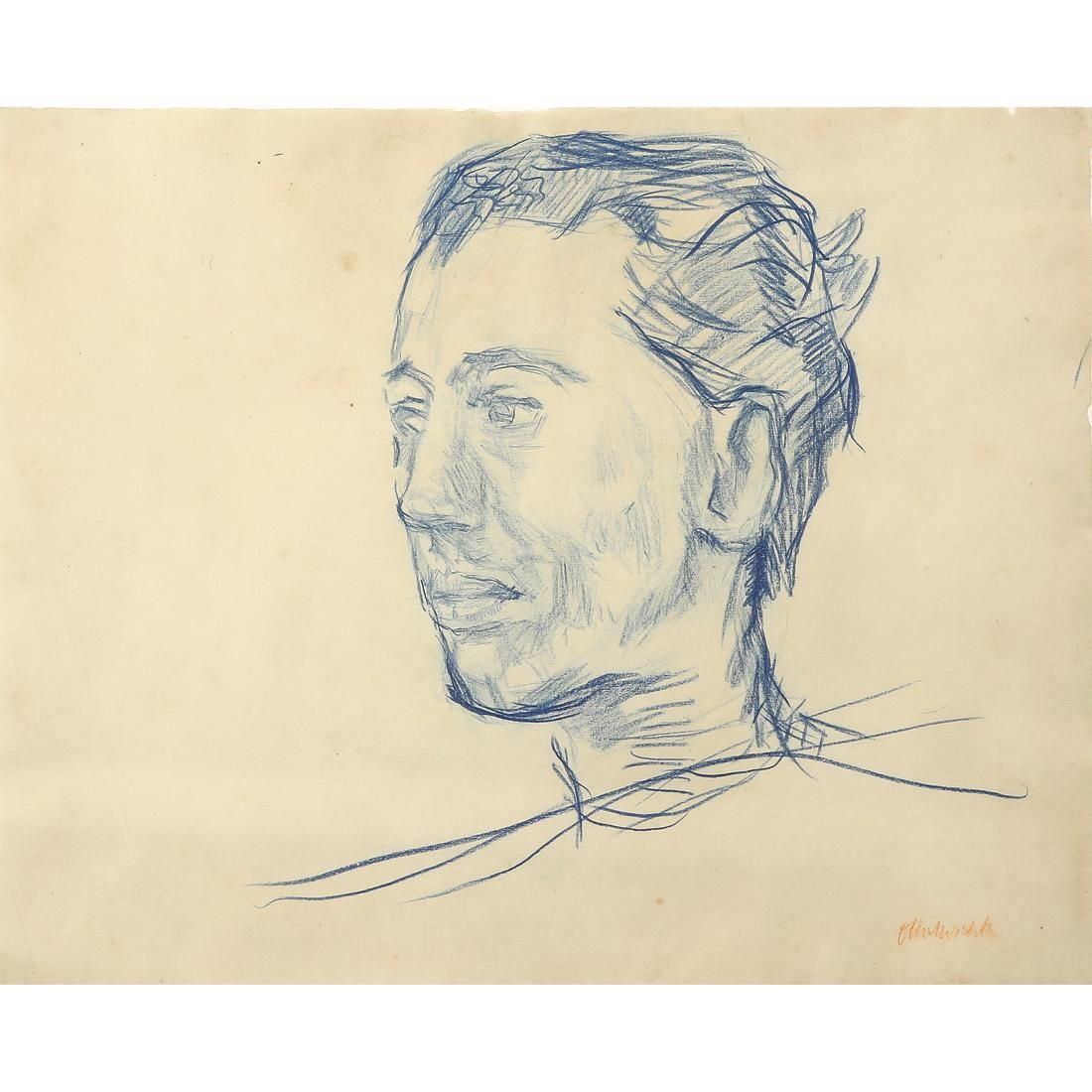
Oskar Kokoschka- Webster Aitken (1938)

Webster Aitken (June 17, 1908 in Nanaimo, British Columbia, Canada – May 11, 1981 in Santa Fe, New Mexico) was an American pianist. He studied piano in Europe with Marie Prentner, Artur Schnabel and Emil von Sauer. In 1929, he made his professional debut in Vienna, Austria. Upon returning to America, he gave a concert in New York City on November 17, 1935. In 1938, Aitken presented a series of recitals in New York City in programs featuring the complete collection of Franz Schubert's works for piano. He subsequently devoted his time to teaching. Aitken performed in the inaugural year of the Peabody Mason Concerts in Boston in 1950. A live recording of a recital Aitken gave of Beethoven's works was released on a Delos label LP, and in the early LP era he began to record all of Schubert's piano sonatas for EMS Records, in competition with the American Vox series by Friedrich Wührer; the latter came to fruition, becoming the first such cycle on records, but Aitken's ended when his label went out of business.

== See also ==
- List of classical pianists
