= Go-go boot =

Style of footwear

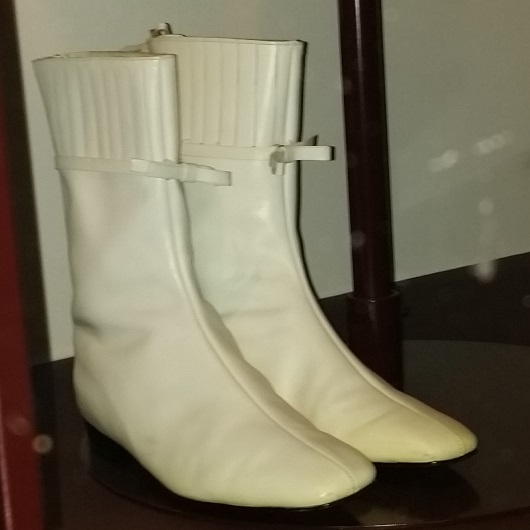
Go-go boots precursor by Andre Courrèges, 1965

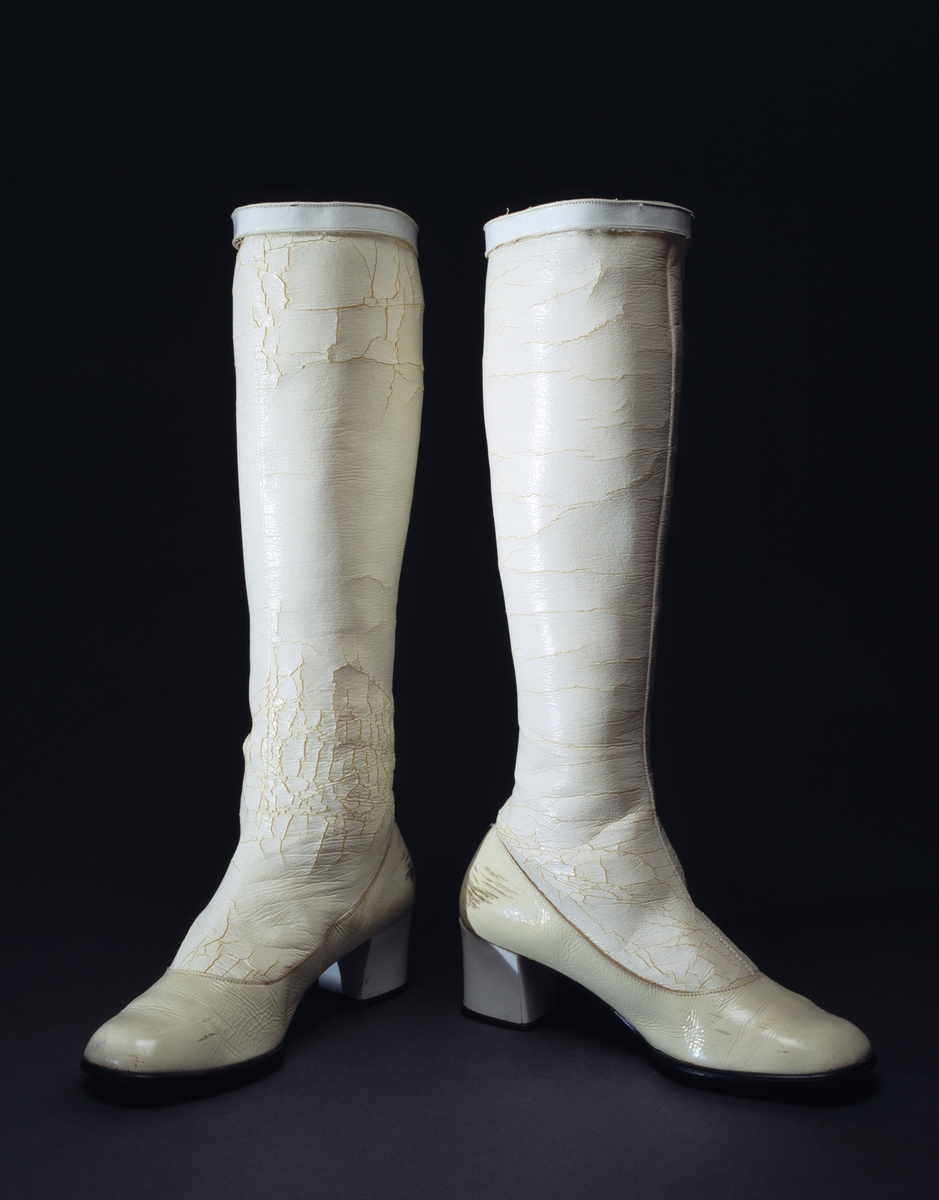
Early 1970s white vinyl go-go boots

Go-go boots are a low-heeled style of women's fashion boot introduced in the mid-1960s. The original go-go boots, as defined by André Courrèges in 1964, were white, low-heeled, and mid-calf in height, a specific style which is sometimes called the Courrèges boot. Since then, the term go-go boot has come to include the knee-high, square-toed boots with block heels that were very popular in the 1960s and 1970s; as well as a number of variations including kitten heeled versions and colours other than white.

== Etymology ==
The term go-go is derived from the French expression à gogo, meaning "in abundance, galore", which is in turn derived from the ancient French word la gogue for "joy, happiness". The term "go-go" has also been explained as a 1964 back-formation of the 1962 slang term "go", meaning something that was "all the rage"; the term "go-go dancer" first appeared in print in 1965. The go-go boot is presumed to have been named after the dance style.

== 1960s ==
Fashion boots were revived in the early 1960s by designers including Beth Levine, although at first they featured fashionable high heels such as the stiletto and kitten heels. Golo is probably best recognized for the invention of the go-go boot in 1964 which was proudly worn by Barbra Streisand and photographed by Richard Avedon in the August 1965 issue of Vogue. The earliest go-go boots were mid-calf, white and flat-heeled, as seen in the work of the designer André Courrèges, who is sometimes credited with creating the style. The simple minimalism of the Courrèges boot was easily and widely reproduced for the mass market. Courrèges boots provided the foundation for the development of the go-go boot, which increasingly came higher up the leg and was made in alternative colours. While remaining low-ish, the heel also became higher and chunkier. The earliest Courrèges boots were made of leather, such as kidskin or patent leather, but many of the subsequent versions and copies were made in PVC, vinyl, and other plastics.

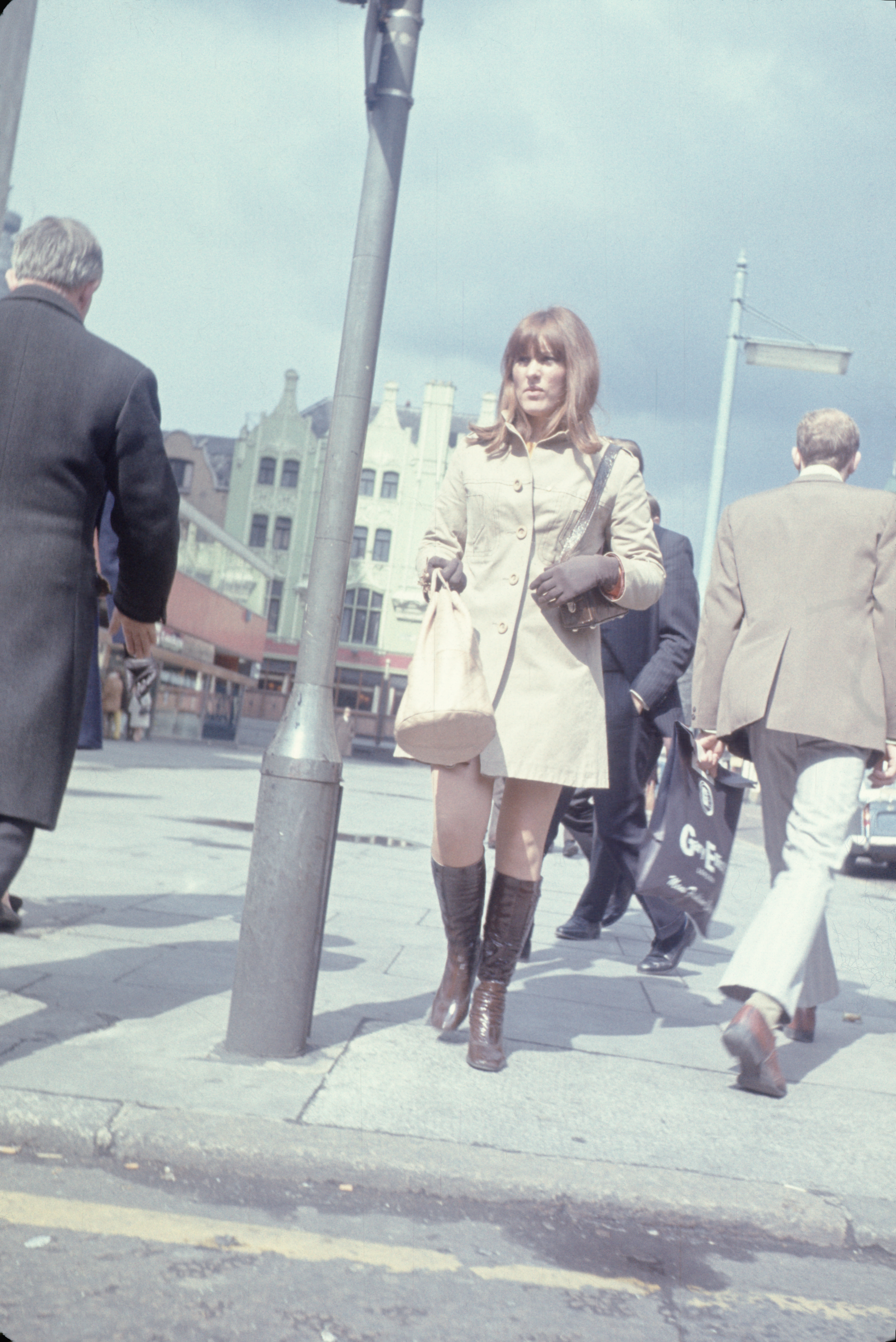
Go-go boots as worn in London in 1969/1970

In 1966, the song "These Boots Are Made for Walkin'" was released and performed by a go-go boot wearing Nancy Sinatra, who is credited with further popularising the boot. Tim Gunn suggests that Sinatra helped establish the boot as "a symbol of female power". Female dancers on the television shows Hullabaloo and Shindig! also wore the short, white boots. This led to the boots sometimes being called "hullabaloo boots," as in an advertisement run in American newspapers in January 1966 for hullabaloo boots with "kooky heels and zipper backs" for the "Go-Go Getter".

== Post-1960s ==
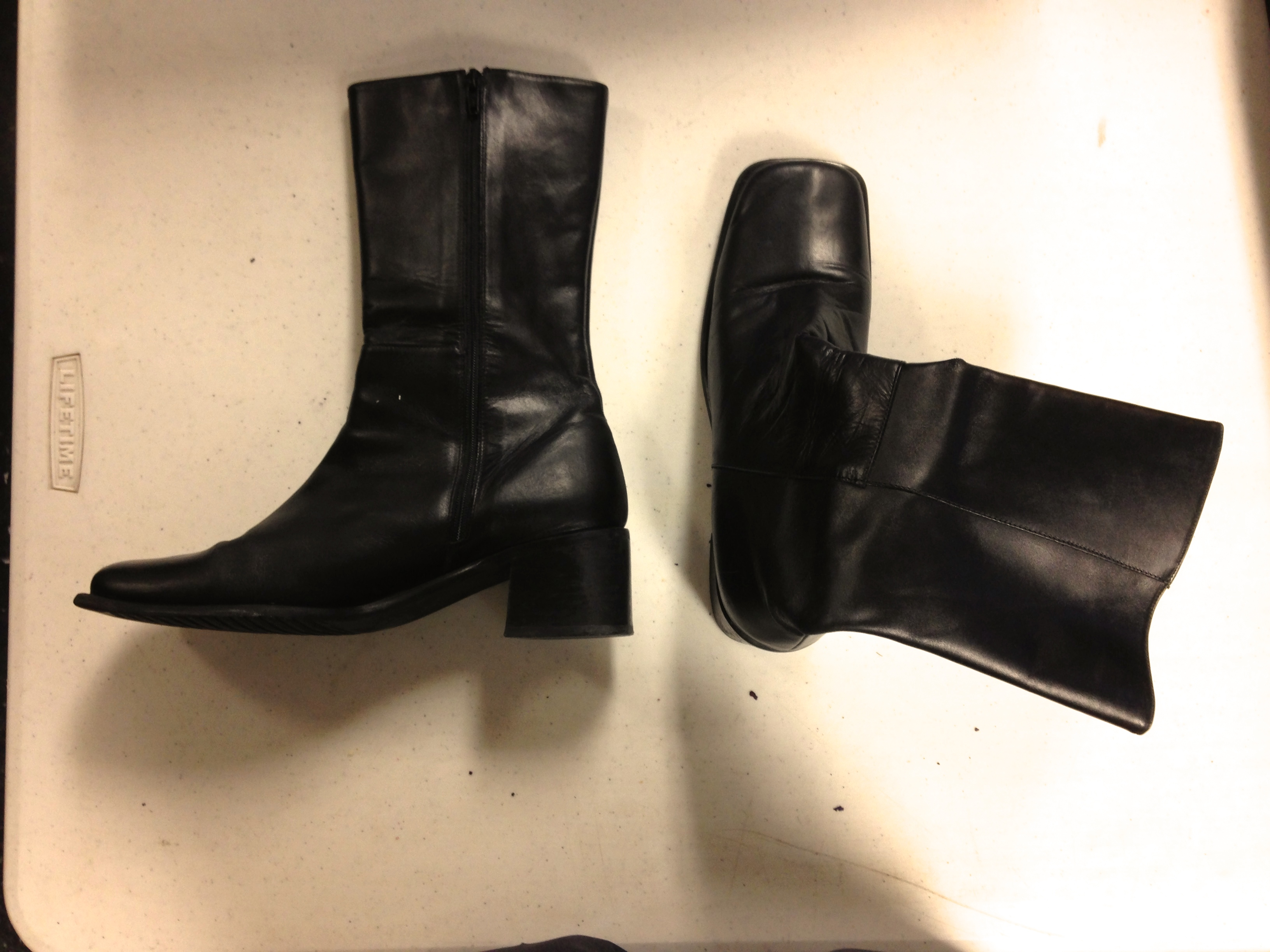
Pair of black go-go boots, mid-1990s

In the mid-1990s, as part of a general revival of 1960s fashions, go-go boots came back into style.

In October 2022, Florida Governor Ron DeSantis drew media attention for wearing footwear that resembled white go-go boots while touring areas of Florida devastated by Hurricane Ian, a Category 5 storm.

== See also ==
- List of boots
- List of shoe styles
