= Marie Prentner =

Marie Prentner (published in 1903) was an Austrian author, composer, educator, and pianist who is best known for her books about Theodor Leschetizky’s piano pedagogy techniques.

Prentner was born in Vienna. LIttle is known about her early life. She studied piano with Theodore Leschetizky and worked as his assistant. She published Leschetizky’s Fundamental Principles of Piano Technique in 1903 and also wrote The Leschetizky Method and The Modern Pianist. Leschetizky said, “You being my pupil of many years’ standing and most valuable assistant, it goes without saying that you are thoroughly qualified to write and publish a school after my principles and system of teaching.”

Prentner taught piano privately and at the Austro-American Conservatory at Mondsee, Austria. Her students included Webster Aitken, Clare Horan Cawley, Leopoldina Corra, Anna Grant Dall, Zibigniew Drzewiecki, and Grace Hamilton Morrey. In 1891, composer Eduard Schutt dedicated his Silhouettes - Portraits, opus 34 (seven piano pieces) to Prentner.

Prentner composed lieder and piano pieces which were performed in recitals by Fannie Bloomfield Zeisler. She dedicated a piano piece to Bloomfield Zeisler.

Prentner’s works were published by Dover Publications, J. Curwen & Sons, Legare Street Press, and Schlesinger. Her publications included:

== Books ==
- Leschetizky's Fundamental Principles of Piano Technique (with Theodor Leschetizky)
- The Leschetizky Method: Experiences in the Technic and Execution of Pianoforte Playing According to the Principles of Professor Theodor Leschetizky (with Theodor Leschetizky)
- The Modern Pianist (with Theodor Leschetizky)

== Piano ==
- Caprice
- Duett
- Scherzo

== Vocal ==
- lieder

- Read The Modern Pianist by Marie Prentner
