= Frances Jakabcin =

Slovak-American community leader (1875-1933)

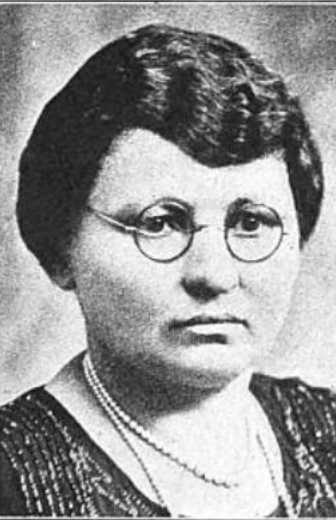
- Jakabcin, from a 1930 publication
- Born: Frances Barnak; November 2, 1875; Poproč, Slovakia
- Died: June 19, 1933 (age 57); Reading, Pennsylvania, U.S.
- Other names: Franciska Sepesi, Frances Sepsie, Franciska Jakabcin, Frances Jacobcin
- Occupations: Community leader, insurance executive

Frances C. Barnak Jakabcin (November 2, 1875 – June 19, 1933) was an American community leader and insurance executive. She was president of the First Catholic Ladies Slovak Union (FCLSU), a fraternal benefit society.

== Early life and education ==
Jakabcin was born in Poproč, Košice-okolie District, Slovakia, the daughter of Franciscus Barnak and Catherina Jaszany Barnak. She emigrated to Pennsylvania as a child.

== Career ==
Jakabcin was president of the Women's Slavonic Union of the United States and Canada, and later of the First Catholic Ladies Slovak Union, a fraternal benefit society from 1911 until her death in 1933. She succeeded Anna Hurban as president, and was succeeded by Helen Kocan.

The FCLSU provided life insurance to its members, supported an orphanage, aided the families of striking miners, and raised scholarship funds, in conjunction with the First Catholic Slovak Union. Under Jakabcin's presidency, the FCLSU had over 50,000 members, and established its headquarters in Cleveland, Ohio. They also raised funds to build a girls' school and a widows' residence. She promoted Americanization, but urged Slovak immigrant parents "against giving their offspring too much freedom in the American way".

Jakabcin also served on the executive committee of the National Fraternal Congress of America. She was credited with pioneering the "juvenile movement among the fraternal benefit societies", when she became the FCLSU's Junior Order Secretary and more than doubled the young membership of the society.

== Personal life and legacy ==
Barnak married twice. Her first husband was John Sepesi; they married in 1890, and lived in Scranton and Dunmore, Pennsylvania. Sepesi (or Sepsie, or Sepse) died in 1906, a few days before their fifth child was born. She married her second husband, John Joseph Jakabcin, in 1914, and had two more sons. Her second husband died in 1931, and she died in 1933, at the age of 57, after falling out of a third-story window at her home in Reading. In 1934, her daughter Frances Sepse was convicted of killing a doctor, Paul R. Hess;

The FCLSU, now known as the First Catholic Ladies Slovak Association, remains in operation, and celebrated its 100th year in 1992. Its district in eastern Pennsylvania was named for Jakabcin in 1941.
