= Dunmore High School =

Coordinates: 41.4282°N 75.6336°W

Dunmore Junior-Senior High School

Location
- 300 West Warren Street; Dunmore, PA 18512; United States

Information
- Type: Public Comprehensive Secondary
- Opened: 1932 (current school)
- School district: Dunmore School District
- Principal: Timothy Hopkins
- Teaching staff: 48.25 (FTE)
- Grades: 7 to 12
- Gender: coed
- Enrollment: 668 (2023–2024)
- Student to teacher ratio: 13.84
- Campus type: Suburban
- Colors: Crimson and Blue
- Mascot: Buck
- Newspaper: The Crimson Courier
- Website: www.dunmoreschooldistrict.net

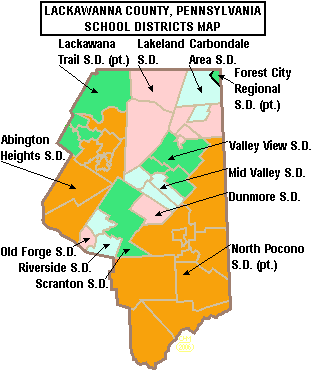
Dunmore School District region in Lackawanna County

Dunmore High School is the secondary education, public school for the borough of Dunmore, Pennsylvania. It is part of the Dunmore School District. Dunmore High School is located at 300 West Warren Street. According to the National Center for Education Statistics, in the 2017–2018 school year, Dunmore High School reported an enrollment of 728 pupils in grades 7 through 12.

Dunmore High School is one of the three (Scranton, Old Forge, Dunmore) school districts in Lackawanna County, Pennsylvania that does not include surrounding boroughs. In June 2014, Dunmore School Board closed the junior high school and consolidated the 7th and 8th grades into the high school building. The middle school functions separately from the high school.

== Extracurriculars ==
Dunmore School District offers a wide variety of clubs, activities and an extensive sports program.

=== Athletics ===
The varsity football program was coached by Jack Henzes until he officially resigned in the spring of 2019. The Dunmore Bucks are now led by Kevin McHale. In 2007, the Dunmore Bucks traveled to Hersheypark Stadium in Hershey, Pennsylvania to play against Terrelle Pryor and the Jeanette Jayhawks for the PIAA Class AA State Title. However, they lost the game with a score of 49–21. Furthermore, the Dunmore Bucks returned to Hersheypark Stadium in Hershey, Pennsylvania, on December 14, 2012, to play for the PIAA State Title; however, this time the Bucks took on the Clariton Bears. Unfortunately, the Bucks lost with a final score of 20–0. In addition to its football program, Dunmore is also home to a girls basketball program, coached by Ben O'Brien. In 2011, the Lady Bucks traveled to the Bryce Jordan Center in University Park, Pennsylvania to play for the PIAA Class AA Girls Basketball Championship. The girls battled against Villa Maria Academy, but they were unsuccessful, losing the game with a score of 62–39.

Student-athletes from Dunmore High School have accepted scholarships to many nationally ranked colleges and universities, including Bucknell University, Bryant University, University of Hartford, University of Delaware, University of Connecticut and Temple University.

Overall, Dunmore High School offers numerous varsity sports including:

- Baseball
- Softball
- Boys Basketball
- Girls Basketball
- Football
- Boys Cross Country
- Girls Cross Country
- Golf
- Boys Soccer
- Girls Soccer
- Boys Tennis
- Girls Tennis
- Boys Track and Field
- Girls Track
- Girls Swim Team
- Girls Volleyball
- Football Cheerleading
- Basketball Cheerleading
- Dance Team
- Silk Squad

According to PIAA directory July 2015

=== Activities ===
Dunmore High School's student body is very active within the school and in the local community. In 2011, the Crimson Courier, Dunmore High School's newspaper, was nationally recognized for its work on an ongoing piece, entitled "Made In America". The newspaper staff was briefly shown on World News With Diane Sawyer in a segment featuring the push to buy American-made products. A more complete article with the students' work was published on ABC News' website.

Overall, Dunmore High School has numerous organizations for its students to become involved with including:

- Marching Band
- Chorus
- Show Choir
- Spanish Club
- French Club
- Health Careers Club
- Newspaper
- Honor Society
- Students Against Destructive Decisions (SADD) Club
- Student Government
- Service Club
- Yearbook Staff
- Computer Club
- Mock Trial Team
- Art Club
- Drama Club (Crimson Company)

== Alma mater ==
The following are the lyrics to Dunmore High School's Alma Mater:

Dear Dunmore, thy honor is safe in the hands
Of thy sons and thy daughters so true.
Thy students and athletes fresh victories each year
Shall win for the Crimson and Blue.

We will strive with our might
Thy fond name to exalt.
We will sacrifice self to thee aim,
And united in heart and in hand will achieve,
Only deeds that shall add to thy fame.

== Notable alumni ==
- Lisa DePaulo (born 1961), journalist and editor for national publications
- Carol Ann Drazba (1943–1966), nurse killed in the Vietnam War
- Vic Fangio (born 1958), NFL coach
- Mike Fanucci (born 1949), NFL player
- Jeanne Marrazzo, infectious disease specialist
- Joseph Minish (1916–2007), U.S. Congressman
- Jim O'Hora (1915–2005), NCAA football coach
- Lou Palazzi (1921–2007), NFL umpire
- Paul W. Richards (born 1964), astronaut, NASA engineer
- John Francis Ropek (1917–2009), oceanographer, meteorologist
- Tim Ruddy (born 1972), NFL player
- Kenneth J. Smith, state legislator
- Junior Walsh (1919–1990), Major League Baseball pitcher
- Jim Halpert (fictional), character on The Office
