= Jefferson Center Dunmore =

School in Dunmore, Pennsylvania, United States

Coordinates: 41.41605°N 75.62990°W

Jefferson Center is a special education school in Dunmore, Pennsylvania, off of Blakely Street. It holds classes for a variety of special education programs, including multi-disabled, elementary autistic, secondary autistic, and life skills.

== Campus ==
The building was formerly used as a Dunmore School District Elementary School, called Jefferson Elementary school, but in 1982, after the elementary school closed down, the [N.E.I.U. #19] began renting out the building for their own use. As of 2006, the N.E.I.U. #19 has gained full ownership of the building and is no longer renting it.

== Curriculum ==
There are currently four classes of students with multiple disabilities, each holding about seven or eight students with one teacher, one teacher's assistant, and, if necessary, a full-time nurse for students who are medically fragile. There are five classes of either elementary autistic or secondary autistic students, which hold about eight students and have one teacher, two teacher's assistants, and individual "one-on-one" specialists, provided by the students' school district, that monitor the behavior of the student they are assigned to. Students in the elementary autism classroom range from five years old to twelve years old, and those in the secondary autism classroom students range in age from thirteen years old to twenty-one years old. And finally, there are five classes of life skills students, which can hold up to ten students with one teacher, one teacher's assistant, and about one or two crisis-intervention workers who control the behavior of the students if necessary.

== Programs and activities ==
Jefferson Center offers many programs and activities to the students, which help make the atmosphere more like a regular-ed school. The programs are available to capable students and try to prepare them for life outside of Jefferson Center. The simplest program is used to test the students and make sure they can listen to and follow instructions before they are sent to more difficult programs. These simple programs include errands around the school, such as separating lunches for specific classrooms, picking up the recycling from each classroom when needed, or helping bring multi-disability students in and out of the building in the morning or afternoon. The next level of programs is also inside the building and is run by the school's cook. Higher level students prepare food in the morning, and lower level students help clean up in the afternoon.

The activities that Jefferson Center offers include annual holiday parties, field trips, basketball, cheerleading, the spirit team, and school pictures. These activities always include the presence of Regular-Ed students from are high schools and middle schools, in order to strive for inclusion. This allows the opportunity for Regular-Ed students to learn more about Special Needs, and for Special education students to feel more included in Regular-Ed activities.

== Job preparation ==
These programs are focused toward what type of jobs the students are capable of after they graduate from Jefferson Center. The highest level program finds jobs for the students at places including Allied, McDonald's, Burger King, Wendy's, Sam's Club, and Krispy Kreme Doughnuts. Students who are involved in these programs tend to be more prepared for life after they graduate from Jefferson and are living on their own.
