= Last Night at the Telegraph Club =

2021 novel by Malinda Lo

- First edition cover
- Author: Malinda Lo
- Language: English
- Genre: Young adult novel; Historical fiction; Romance
- Publisher: Dutton Books for Young Readers
- Publication date: January 19, 2021
- Publication place: United States
- Pages: 416
- Awards: National Book Award
- ISBN: 978-0-525-55525-4

Last Night at the Telegraph Club is a young adult historical novel written by Malinda Lo and published on January 19, 2021, by Dutton Books for Young Readers. It is set in 1950s San Francisco and tells the story of Lily Hu, a teenage daughter of Chinese immigrants as she begins to explore her sexuality.

The novel was received positively, getting starred reviews from Kirkus Reviews and Publishers Weekly, and received the National Book Award for Young People's Literature.

== Background ==
The story for Last Night at the Telegraph Club was first published by Malinda Lo in an anthology as a short story, named "New Year". Lo came up with the idea for it when she heard about the lesbian bars that operated in North Beach, near San Francisco's Chinatown.

She spent three years writing the book. During her research for the book, Lo visited the GLBT Historical Society. The author also drew from her own experience going to lesbian bars to write some of the scenes.

Lo's book was influenced by Sarah Waters' Tipping the Velvet and Patricia Highsmith's The Price of Salt. She was also inspired by Kevin Kwan's Crazy Rich Asians when deciding to use footnotes for occasions where Chinese words appear. Lo also mentions Rise of the Rocket Girls, by Nathalia Holt, and Wide-Open Town: A History of Queer San Francisco to 1965, by Nan Alamilla Boyd, as two books she was reading when writing the original short story, which influenced her writing. The title was inspired by the novel Last Night at the Blue Angel: A Novel by Rebecca Rotert.

== Publication history ==
The rights to the publication of Last Night at the Telegraph Club in North America were acquired by Dutton Books for Young Readers' editor Andrew Karre in early 2017, through Lo's agent Michael Bourret. The book was initially scheduled to be released in 2019. In June 2020, Penguin Random House began advertising the release of the book, which was moved to January 19, 2021.

=== Companion book ===
In September 2021, Publishers Weekly reported the rights for a companion book had been acquired by Andrew Karre, to be published in 2022. Called A Scatter of Light, it tells the story of Aria Tang West, who is connected to the two main characters from Last Night at the Telegraph Club. Lo began writing A Scatter of Light in 2013, but only received an offer for the story in 2017, after Karre offered to buy the rights for it and Last Night at the Telegraph Club. According to the author, they agreed to first publish Last Night at the Telegraph Club in response to the "nightmare of the Trump administration". After returning to it, Lo created a connection between the two stories.

The book was released on October 4, 2022.

== Reception ==
Kirkus Reviews gave Lo's book a starred review, saying it is "the intersectional, lesbian, historical teen novel so many readers have been waiting for." They praised Lo's "queer positive" story and noted how well through her research the author "skillfully layers rich details" about the main character and Chinatown. Ashleigh Williams, for the School Library Journal, commented on the several themes present on the book, but said "an abundance of detail weighs down the plot." Williams also criticized the heavy focus of the story on worldbuilding, but praised the development of the main character's relationships, and concluded by calling Last Night at the Telegraph Club a "pensive, rich work of queer historical fiction".

Publishers Weekly commented on Lo's incorporation of Chinese food and culture into the story, which includes explanatory footnotes. They also noted how the author "conjures 1950s San Francisco adeptly while transcending historicity through a sincere exploration of identity and love." The publication gave the novel a starred review and highlighted it in their 2021 "Best Books" list.

In November 2021, the National Book Foundation announced Last Night at the Telegraph Club had received the National Book Award for Young People's Literature. This was the first time a young adult book featuring an LGBT woman as the main character won the National Book Award. In their praise, one of the judges said the novel "glows with desire and hums with sensuality as sapphic romance flashes against fear and intolerance." During her acceptance speech, Malinda Lo talked about "diversity and inclusion and living in a time when many books are under siege from people advancing and attempting to enforce conservative views."

In January 2022, the book received the Stonewall Book Award for Young Adult Literature, the Asian/Pacific American Award for Youth Literature, and a Michael L. Printz Honor.

== Censorship ==
According to the American Library Association, Last Night at the Telegraph Club was tied for the fifth most banned and challenged book in the United States in 2025.

In November 2024, the book was banned by Katy Independent School District in Katy, Texas

In May 2025, the South Carolina Board of Education banned the book under regulations prohibiting "sexual material". In an opinion piece published in the South Carolina Daily Gazette, Lo criticized the board for focusing solely on the book's depiction of sex.
