= Dunmore School District =

School district in Pennsylvania

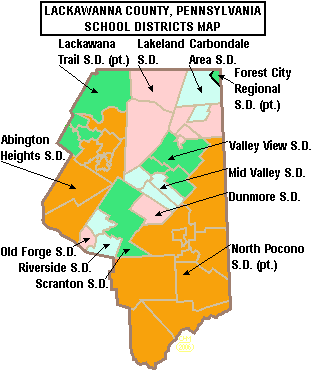

Address
- 300 West Warren Street Dunmore, Lackawanna, Pennsylvania, 18512; United States

District information
- Type: Public

Students and staff
- District mascot: Bucks
- Colors: Crimson and Blue

Other information
- Website: www.dunmoreschooldistrict.net

The Dunmore School District is a small, suburban public school district which serves the Borough of Dunmore in Lackawanna County, Pennsylvania, US. Dunmore School District encompasses approximately 9 square miles (23 km^{2}). According to 2000 federal census data, it served a resident population of 14,081. According to the US Census Bureau 2010 federal census data, Dunmore School District resident population declined to 14,052 people. The educational attainment levels for the Dunmore School District population (25 years old and over) were 92% high school graduates and 29.5% college graduates.

According to the Pennsylvania Budget and Policy Center, 33.8% of the district's pupils lived at 185% or below the Federal Poverty level as shown by their eligibility for the federal free or reduced price school meal programs in 2012. In 2009, the district residents’ per capita income was $19,851, while the median family income was $43,354. In the Commonwealth, the median family income was $49,501 and the United States median family income was $49,445, in 2010. In Lackawanna County, the median household income was $43,673. By 2013, the median household income in the United States rose to $52,100.

The Dunmore School District operates three schools: Dunmore High School, Dunmore Middle School and Dunmore Elementary Center. High school students may choose to attend Career and Technology Center of Lackawanna County for training in the construction and mechanical trades. The Northeastern Educational Intermediate Unit IU19 provides the district with a wide variety of services like specialized education for disabled students and hearing, speech and visual disability services and professional development for staff and faculty.

In the Spring of 2014, Dunmore School Board voted to combine the high school and middle school into Dunmore Junior/Senior High School beginning 2014–15 school year.

== Extracurriculars ==
The Dunmore School District offers a variety of clubs, activities and an extensive sports program.

=== Sports ===
The district funds:

Varsity

Boys

- Baseball - AA
- Basketball- AA
- Cross Country - A
- Football - AA
- Golf - AA
- Soccer - AA
- Tennis - AA
- Track and Field - AA

Girls

- Basketball - AA
- Golf - AA
- Cross Country - A
- Soccer (Fall) - A
- Softball - AA
- Swimming and Diving - AA
- Girls' Tennis - AAA
- Track and Field - AA
- Volleyball - AA

Middle School Sports

Boys

- Basketball
- Cross Country
- Track and Field

Girls

- Basketball
- Cross Country
- Softball
- Track and Field

According to PIAA directory July 2014
