= Eduard Schütt =

Russian composer (1856–1933)

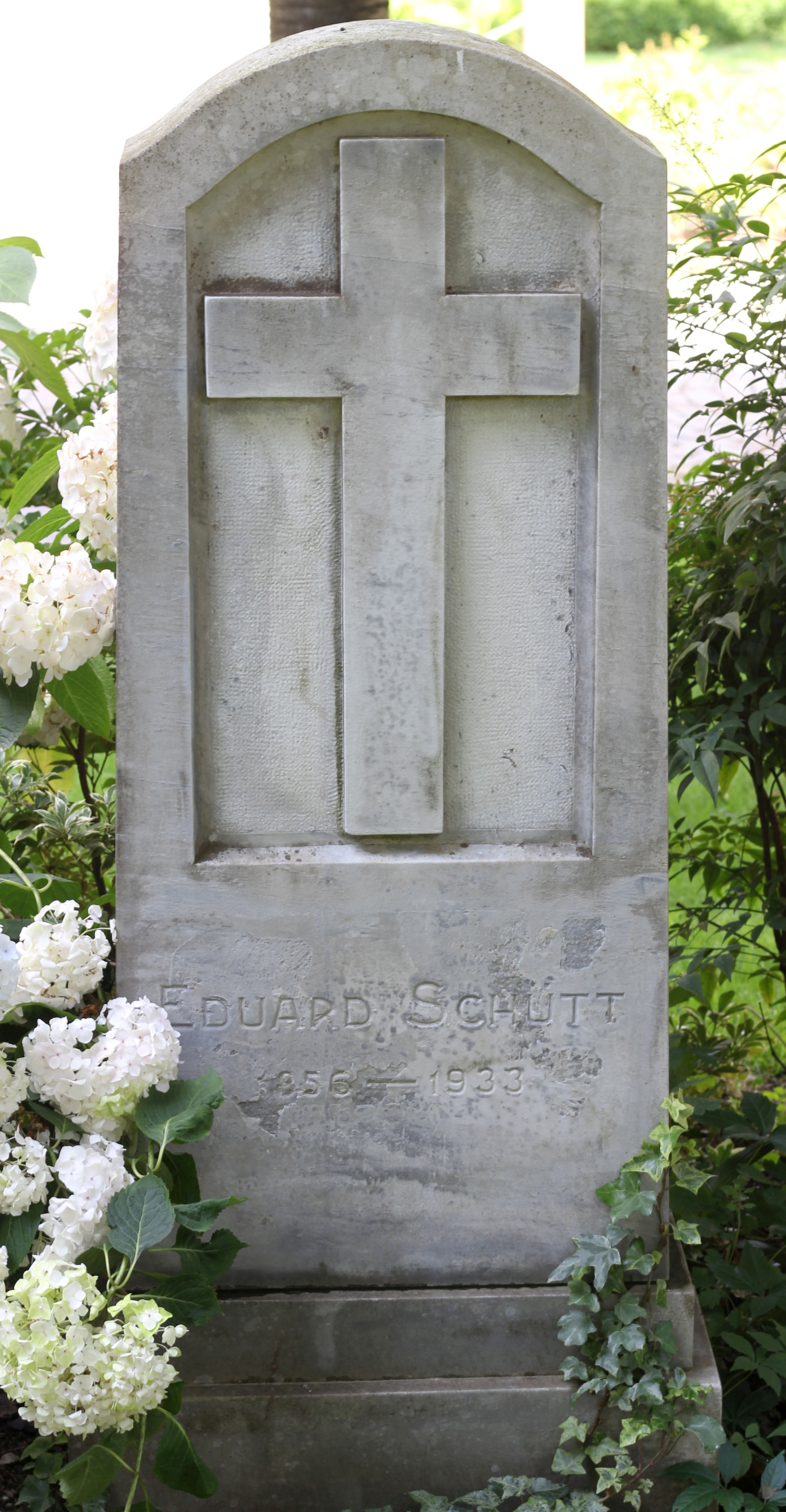
Tombstone for Eduard Schütt in Meran

Eduard Schütt (Russian: Эдуард Шютт; 22 October 1856 – 26 July 1933) was a Russian composer, pianist, and conductor.

== Life ==
Eduard Schütt was born in Saint Petersburg, Russia. His parents were Austrian. His father was a skilled cellist, and the family was acquainted with the pianist Anton Rubinstein. At the age of sixteen, Schütt decided to pursue an artistic career, against the opposition of his father. Rubinstein's influence ultimately convinced Schütt's father to let him pursue his artistic aspirations.

Schütt graduated from the St. Petersburg Conservatory in 1875 with distinction. In 1876, he travelled to Leipzig and studied under Salomon Jadassohn, Ernst Friedrich Richter, and Carl Reinecke. After completing two years of study in Leipzig, he journeyed to Vienna, where he commenced studies with Theodor Leschetizky. Schütt was favored by Leschetizky, and the two remained close lifelong friends. Schütt dedicated his composition Silhouettes-Portraits, Op. 34, to Leschetizky’s assistant Marie Prentner.

During the following few years, Schütt concertized in Hungary, Austria, and Bohemia. Around 1882, he composed and premiered his first piano concerto, Op. 7, in several major European cities. From 26 January 1881 to 20 October 1887, he was conductor of the Wiener akademischer Wagner-Verein (Vienna Academic Wagner Society). In 1887, he declined an invitation from Cosima Wagner to become the music director for the Bayreuth Festival. Thereafter, he devoted himself fully to composition and spent a considerable amount of his time at his villa in Meran, which he called "Mon Repos" ("My Peace" in French). His primary residence, however, remained in Vienna, where he also did a limited amount of teaching. Throughout his life, Schütt composed a wide range of works, primarily for the piano, from miniature piano pieces to piano concertos, trios, and suites. He also composed a comic opera.

== Selected works ==
Concertante

- Piano Concerto No. 1 in G minor, Op. 7
- Piano Concerto No. 2 in F minor, Op. 47

Chamber music

- Piano Quartet in F major, Op. 12
- Piano Trio No. 1 in C minor, Op. 27
- Suite No. 1 in D minor for violin and piano, Op. 44
- Piano Trio No. 2 in E minor, Op. 51
- Suite No. 2 in E major for violin and piano, Op. 61
- Fantasie in A major for cello and piano, Op. 63
- 2 Mélodies for cello and piano, Op. 70

Piano

- Etude mignonne, in D major, Op. 16 No. 1
- Valse mignonne, Op. 16 No. 2
- 3 Intermèdes, Op. 40, including "Cavatine"
- Carnaval Mignon, Scènes pantomimiques, Op. 48
- Papillons d'amour, Op. 59 (of which no. 2, "A la bien-aimée", is his best-known work)
- Impressions, 5 Pieces, Op. 71
- Concert Paraphrases on J. Strauss' Waltz Motives
- Silhouettes-Portraits, 7 pieces, Op. 34
