= Malinda Lo =

American writer

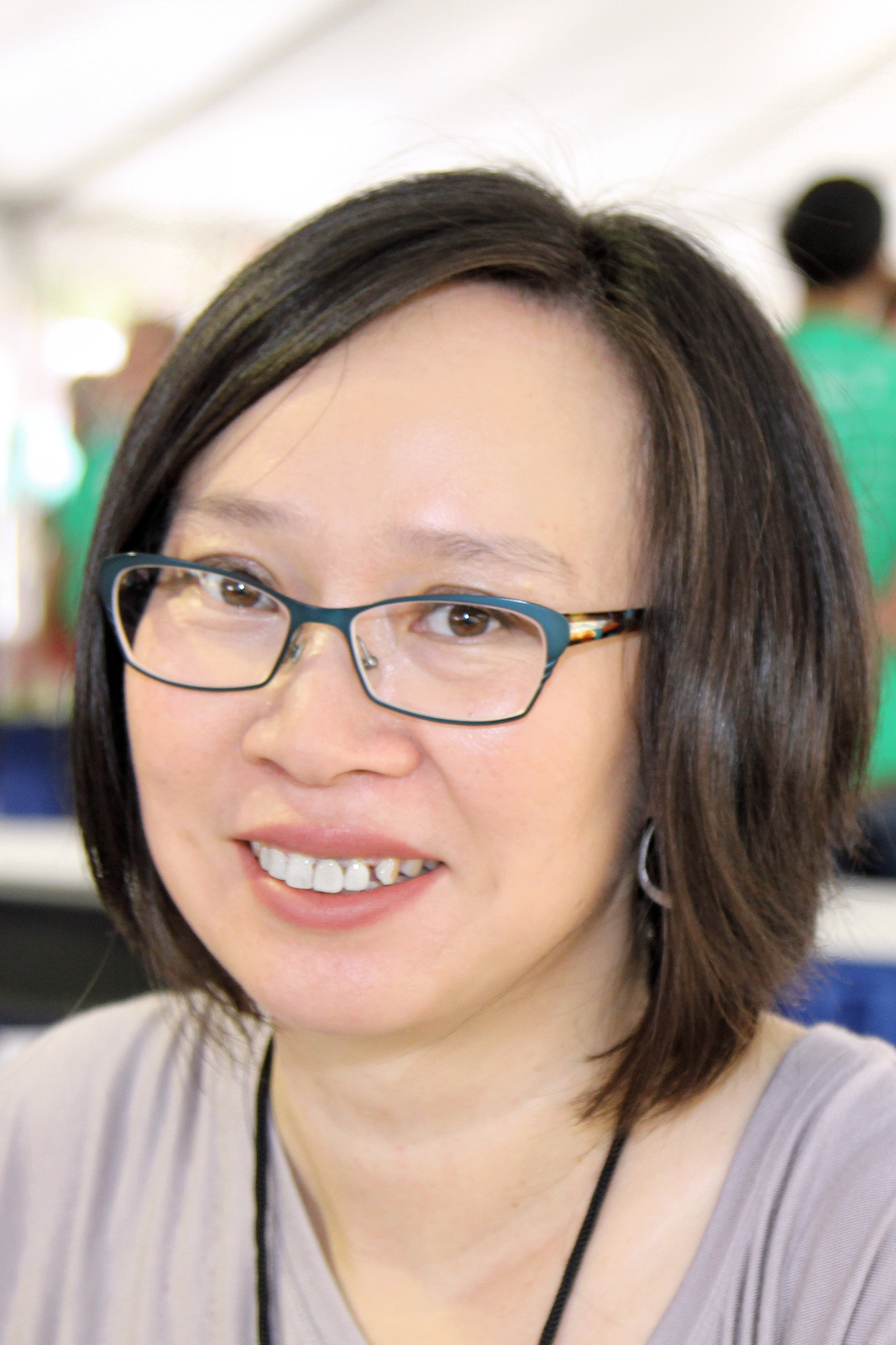
- Lo at the 2017 Texas Book Festival
- Education: Wellesley College; Harvard University (MA); Stanford University (MA)
- Occupation: Writer
- Spouse: Amy Lovell
- Relatives: Ruth Earnshaw Lo (grandmother)
- Writing career
- Period: 2009–present
- Genres: Young adult, fantasy, science fiction
- Website: www.malindalo.com

Malinda Lo is an American writer of young adult novels including Ash, Huntress, Adaptation, Inheritance, A Line in the Dark, and Last Night at the Telegraph Club. She also does research on diversity in young adult literature and publishing.

== Personal life ==
Lo was born in China and moved to the United States at the age of three. She graduated from Wellesley College and earned a master's degree in Regional Studies from Harvard. She enrolled at Stanford with the intention of obtaining a PhD in Cultural and Social Anthropology, but left with a second master's degree.

Malinda Lo was made a member of the faculty of the Lambda Literary Foundation's 2013 Writer Retreat for Emerging LGBT Voices, along with Samuel R. Delany, Sarah Schulman and David Groff.

She resides in Massachusetts with her wife, Amy Lovell.

In 2022, Lo was named by Carnegie Corporation of New York as an honoree of the Great Immigrants Awards.

== Writing career ==
Lo began writing for the culture blog AfterEllen in 2003, and at one point served as the managing editor.

She was also a contributing writer for Curve magazine from 2005 to 2007, acting as associate editor for a majority of her tenure.

Her first novel, Ash, was published by Little, Brown Books for Young Readers in 2009. Ash was a finalist for the William C. Morris Award, the Andre Norton Award for YA Fantasy and Science Fiction, the Mythopoeic Fantasy Award, and the Lambda Literary Award. Her second book, Huntress, was published by Little, Brown in 2011. It is set in the same fantasy world as Ash, which mixes East Asian and European influences; it too was a finalist for the Lambda Literary Award finalist and for the 2012 Gaylactic Spectrum Award for Best Novel, as well as being judged a Best Book for Young Adults by the American Library Association. Her third book, Adaptation, was published in 2012. Reviewers at Kirkus Reviews and elsewhere have compared it favorably to the television program The X-Files. The X-Files was also the subject of Lo's graduate research at Stanford. A sequel to Adaptation, titled Inheritance, was published in 2013.

A stand-alone thriller novel, A Line in the Dark, was published in 2017 and was named a Best Book of the Year by Kirkus, Vulture, and Chicago Public Library.

In 2021, Lo released the book Last Night at the Telegraph Club, following a teenaged American-born Chinese woman coming to terms with her homosexuality during the McCarthy Red Scare in 1950s San Francisco, adapted from a short story she wrote for the 2018 anthology All Out: The No-Longer-Secret Stories Of Queer Teens Throughout The Ages. She has since written Notes from the Telegraph Club, a series of blogposts about her research for the novel, and described that she chose to use Chinese characters with footnote translations for when the characters are speaking Chinese to each other, partly because the romanization of Chinese was not yet standardized in the 1950s and "Romanized Chinese of the 1950s was for the benefit of non-Chinese Westerners, mostly white people" and partly to make clear the sense of insider versus outsider culture. Last Night at the Telegraph Club was well received, with Kirkus opening their review with "Finally, the intersectional, lesbian, historical teen novel so many readers have been waiting for" and Joanne Zou writing for Farrago that it "struck a very personal chord with me. It is a book full of hope and love and community and gay people, some of my favourite elements in storytelling. I am glad this book exists and it made me glad that I exist." In May 2021, it was announced that Last Night at the Telegraph Club had earned Lo another ALA Best Fiction for Young Adults nomination. In November 2021, the novel was awarded the National Book Award for Young People's Literature. Last Night at the Telegraph Club won the 2022 Stonewall Book Award for Young Adult Literature.

Lo followed up Last Night at the Telegraph Club with a standalone companion novel called A Scatter of Light, which was published on October 4, 2022. A coming-of-age story, it is set in 2013, during the time same-sex marriage is legalized in California, a topic which is used to connect the two novels.

== Research on diversity ==
In 2011, Malinda Lo co-founded Diversity in YA, a website and book tour to promote and celebrate diverse representations in young adult literature, with fellow young adult author Cindy Pon. Diversity in YA highlights books with characters of color, LGBTQ characters, and disabled characters and collects data on the number of books with diverse characters and authors that are published annually. Starting in 2012, Lo has periodically published analysis of the diversity in Publishers Weekly and New York Times bestselling young adult novels. Her 2013 analysis showed that 15 percent of New York Times bestselling young adult novels featured main characters of color, 12 percent featured LGBT main characters, and three percent had main characters with disabilities.

== Selected works ==
=== Stand-alone novels ===
- A Line in the Dark (2017)
- Last Night at the Telegraph Club (2021)
- A Scatter of Light (2022)

=== Series ===
==== Ash and Huntress universe ====
- Ash (2009)
- Huntress (2011)
- The Fox (2011), short story set after Huntress, published in Subterranean Magazine, summer 2011 (Subterranean Press # 19)

Ash is also found in Love Bites 2: Arizona / Ash / Blood Ties / The Secret Circle: The Initiation and the Captive (2010)

==== Adaptation series ====
- Adaptation (2012)
- Inheritance (2013)
- Natural Selection (2013) Short story, online

==== Riverside series ====
- Malinda Lo contributed to Tremontaine, the prequel to Ellen Kushner's Riverside series. The prequel was written by Ellen Kushner, Alaya Dawn Johnson, Malinda Lo, Joel Derfner, Racheline Maltese, Patty Bryant, and Paul Witcover with cover art by Kathleen Jennings, and was published as a digital serial by Serial Box in 2015–2016.

=== Stand-alone short stories ===
- "One True Love" (2012) in Foretold: 14 Tales of Prophecy and Prediction, edited by Carrie Ryan, republished in Heiresses of Russ 2013: The Year's Best Lesbian Speculative Fiction (2013), edited by Tenea D. Johnson and Steve Berman
- "Good Girl" (2012) in Diverse Energies, edited by Tobias S. Buckle and Joe Monti, republished in Futuredaze 2: Reprise (2014), edited by Erin Underwood and Nancy Holder
- "Ghost Town" (2013) in Defy The Dark, edited by Saundra Mitchell
- "The Twelfth Girl" (2014) in Grim, edited by Christine Johnson
- "The Cure" (2015) in Interfictions: A Journal of Interstitial Arts, Issue 6, November 2015, found online
- "New Year" (2018) in All Out: The No-Longer-Secret Stories of Queer Teens throughout the Ages, an anthology edited by Saundra Mitchell, February 2018, subsequently adapted to her novel Last Night at the Telegraph Club (2021)
- "Meet Cute" (2018) in Fresh Ink, an anthology edited by Lamar Giles, August 2018
- "We Could Be Heroes" (2018) in Autostraddle, October 1, 2019, found online
- "Red" (2019) in Foreshadow, Issue 1, January 2019, found online
- "Don't Speak" (2019) in The New York Times, "Viewfinders: 10 Y.A. Novelists Spin Fiction From Vintage Photos," June 28, 2019

=== Nonfiction ===
- A letter to her sixteen-year-old self, in The Letter Q: Queer Writers' Notes to their Younger Selves (2012), edited by Sarah Moon and James License
- "Forever Feminist," essay in the anthology Here We Are: Feminism for the Real World (2017), edited by Kelly Jensen

==== Articles and interviews ====
- Notes & Queeries (2008-2009) a monthly column for AfterEllen.com
- The Lo-Down (2005–2009) a monthly column for AfterEllen.com
- Malinda Lo has written various freelance articles, and further articles for AfterEllen.com
