= A Scatter of Light =

2022 novel by Malinda Lo

- First edition
- Author: Malinda Lo
- Language: English
- Genre: Young adult novel; Coming-of-age story; Romance
- Publisher: Dutton Books for Young Readers
- Publication date: October 4, 2022
- Publication place: United States
- Pages: 336
- ISBN: 978-0-525-55528-5

A Scatter of Light is a young adult coming-of-age story written by Malinda Lo and published on October 4, 2022, by Dutton Books for Young Readers. A standalone companion book to Lo's previous novel, Last Night at the Telegraph Club, it tells the story of Aria West as she explores her sexuality and the LGBTQ culture in San Francisco.

== Reception ==
Kirkus Reviews called A Scatter of Light "[a] contemporary queer coming-of-age story steeped in pivotal events", in reference to the novel's setting of 2013 and the legalization of same-sex marriage in California. While the publication praised the setting, calling it "richly detailed", it noted that the story would have been improved if it focused more on the personal lives of the main characters. Publishers Weekly, which gave the novel a starred review, called it an "expansive tale of yearning, self-discovery, and first love."

A review for The Horn Book Magazine commented on the connection between Aria West and the main character from Last Night at the Telegraph Club, saying "readers will be delighted to discover the connection between [the two]." The reviewer also praised Malinda Lo's take on the topics explored in the novel, and called it "an intimate, exhilarating story of [first] love." Molly Horan, for The Booklist, commended the author for her use of the Tumblr website in the novel, which made it feel "wonderfully early 2010s" while the main character's exploration of her own sexuality felt "timeless".
