= Červeňany =

Červeňany Veres
- Municipality
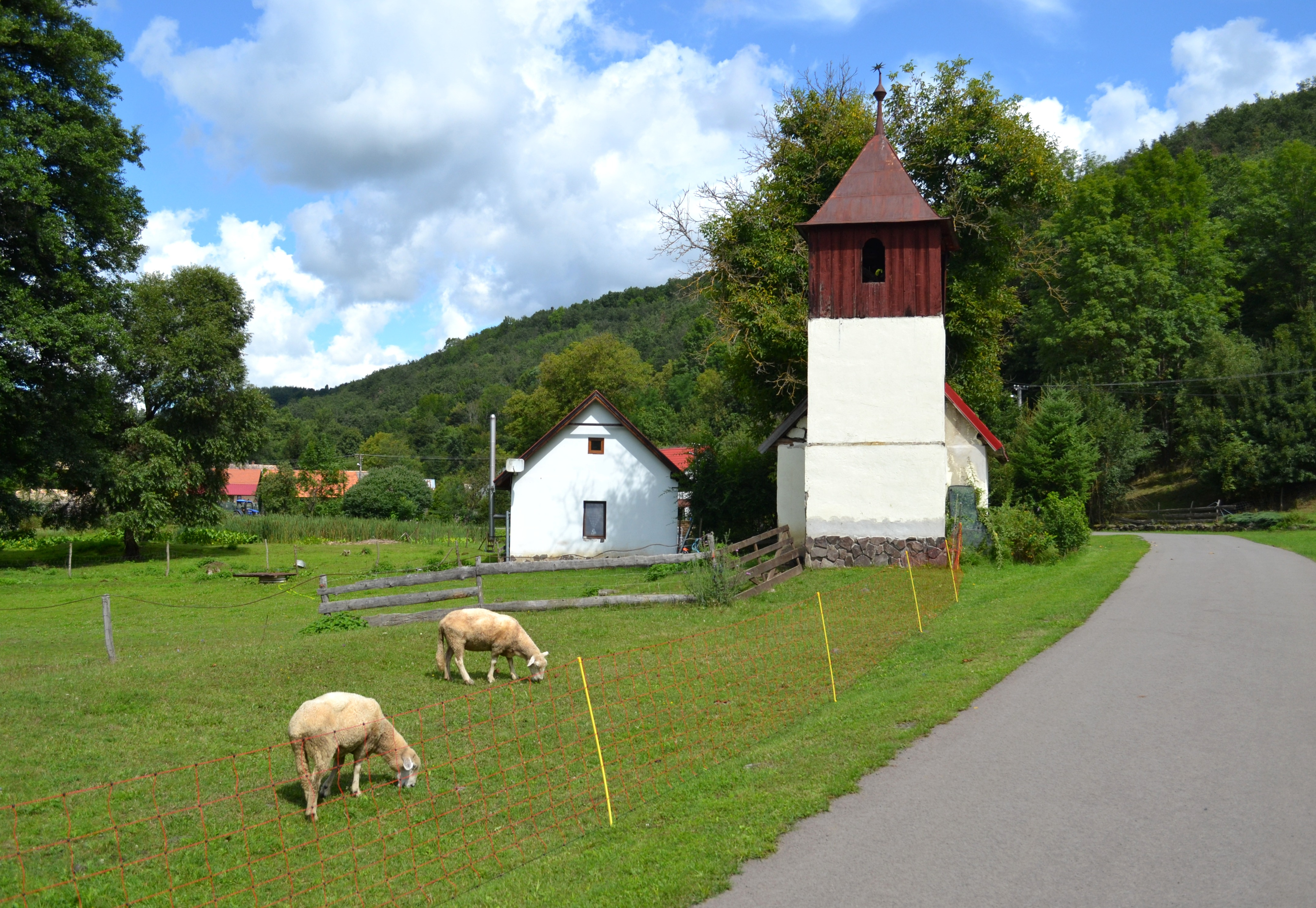

- Flag

- Location of Červeňany in the Banská Bystrica Region Location of Červeňany in Slovakia
- Coordinates: 48.38°N 19.39°E
- Country: Slovakia
- Region: Banská Bystrica Region
- District: Veľký Krtíš District
- First mentioned: 1345

Area
  - Total: 6.74 km^{2} (2.60 sq mi)
- Elevation: 339 m (1,112 ft)

Population (2025)
  - Total: 41
- Time zone: UTC+1 (CET)
  - Summer (DST): UTC+2 (CEST)
- Postal code: 962 75
- Area code: +421 47
- Vehicle registration plate (until 2022): VK
- Website: cervenany.sk

Červeňany (Hungarian: Veres) is a village and municipality in the Veľký Krtíš District of the Banská Bystrica Region of southern Slovakia.

== Geography ==
The municipality lies at an altitude of 339 metres (1,112 ft) and covers an area of 6.74 km^{2} (2.60 sq mi) (2025).

== History ==
The village was first mentioned in 1345 (Verus). It belonged to Divín castle.

== Genealogical resources ==
The records for genealogical research are available at the state archive "Statny Archiv in Banska Bystrica, Slovakia"

- Lutheran church records (births/marriages/deaths): 1727-1895 (parish B)

== Population ==
Population statistic (10 years)
Year	1995	2005	2015	2025
Count	25	33	43	41
Difference		+32%	+30.30%	−4.65%

Population statistic
Year	2024	2025
Count	41	41
Difference		+0%

It has a population of 41 people (31 December 2025).

=== Ethnicity ===
Census 2021 (1+ %)
Ethnicity	Number	Fraction
Slovak	34	100%
Romani	2	5.88%
Total	34	

In year 2021 was 34 people by ethnicity 34 as Slovak and 2 as Romani.

Note on population: The difference values of population numbers in the table "Population statistic" and in the sections "Ethnicity" & "Religion" is caused by the use of various statistical methods.

=== Religion ===
Census 2021 (1+ %)
Religion	Number	Fraction
None	18	52.94%
Roman Catholic Church	8	23.53%
Evangelical Church	6	17.65%
Not found out	1	2.94%
Christian Congregations in Slovakia	1	2.94%
Total	34	

In year 2021 was 34 people by religion 18 from None, 8 from Roman Catholic Church, 6 from Evangelical Church, 1 from Not found out and 1 from Christian Congregations in Slovakia.

== See also ==
- List of municipalities and towns in Slovakia
