= Ash (novel) =

2009 young adult fantasy lesbian novel by Malinda Lo

- Cover illustration of the novel Ash by Malinda Lo
- Author: Malinda Lo
- Language: English
- Genre: Young adult novel
- Publisher: Little, Brown and Company
- Publication date: 2009
- Publication place: United States
- Media type: Print (hardback & paperback)
- ISBN: 0-316-04009-6

Ash is a young adult fantasy children's novel by Malinda Lo first published in 2009. It is a reworking of the Cinderella fairy tale that reimagines the title character, Ash, as a lesbian teenager. The novel centers around the familiar story of Cinderella, her father recently remarried, and lamenting the misery of her new life with stepsisters and a stepmother. The twist arrives when Ash falls in love with the King's respected huntress Kaisa, after she has made a commitment to dark fairy prince Sidhean.

== Plot summary ==
Aisling (pronounced Ash-ling), known as Ash to her friends, is a teenage girl whose mother was once apprenticed to the local Greenwitch. Some time after Ash's mother dies, her father, a merchant, goes on a business trip and returns married to a woman with two daughters, the eldest of these is Ana who is Ash's age. Soon after they move in though, Ash's father becomes gravely ill, and instead of allowing the Greenwitch to care for him, Ash's stepmother takes him to the city to be treated by their Philosophers, who bleed him and cause his death, as the Greenwich warned they would.

After her father's death, Ash's stepmother discovers he was deeply in debt, and sells Ash's childhood home to try and pay off some of his debts. The stepmother also declares that in order to earn her keep, Ash will serve as a servant in her home, as she has to lay off the rest of the staff because she can no longer afford to keep them. Ash's sole source of comfort is reading fairy tales by firelight each night. Ash wishes that fairies will take her away to their world where all her dreams will come true just like she once wished as a little girl.

One night, the mysterious and sinister fairy prince Sidhean (pronounced She-ann) finds Ash wandering through the woods on an enchanted path that connects Ash's new home to her old one, where her mother was buried. Sidhean warns Ash not to use this path and to stop seeking him out but Ash does not listen and seeks him out multiple times. Eventually Sidhean gifts Ash with a beautiful cloak and a pendant. but even though Ash begs him to keep her by his side in the faerie realm he always tells her it is not time.

One day, Ash meets Kaisa—a noblewoman and the King's Huntress. Ash and Kaisa form an immediate and deep friendship, and eventually Kaisa teaches Ash to ride a horse and invites her to the King's Hunt. However, afraid that her stepmother will not allow her to go, Ash asks Sidhean for help and a disguise. Sidhean agrees but tells Ash there is a price to pay: if he grants her wish she will belong to him. Ash agrees, thinking it is her chance to finally leave her stepmother and enter the faerie kingdom. However, Ash begins to fall in love with the beautiful, strong Kaisa. Hoping to see her again, Ash asks Sidhean for another favor: to help her attend a ball at the castle, at which it is rumored the prince will choose his future bride. Sidhean agrees and gifts Ash a moonstone ring which Ash believes is magic, as she describes a feeling as if the ring binds her soul to Sidhean's. Sidhean also provides a beautiful blue gown and a coach for her to use to get to the ball, with a warning that it will only last until midnight.

At the ball Ash unknowingly accepts a dance offer from the prince, and even though she does not know how to dance, she realizes her shoes and gown are enchanted to make her dance perfectly. While trying to get away from the prince, Ash runs into Kaisa who wants to know where Ash is getting all her fancy clothing and jewels since she knows Ash is a servant. Ash realizes that not only can she not tell Kaisa about Sidhean, but that she is now trapped, because fulfilling her promise to Sidhean will mean never seeing Kaisa again. She realizes that she has real feelings for Kaisa, and that Kaisa confesses she also has feelings for her.

Ash leaves the ball later than she expected and her stepmother and sisters arrive home in time to see her still dressed in her magical gown and jewels. They accuse her of stealing and her stepmother cuts off Ash's hair, beats her and locks her in the cellar. Sidhean rescues her however, and tells her that he knew her mother when she was a young girl herself. He tells Ash that he knew her mother had magical powers and wanted to convince her to go with him to the faerie kingdom, but instead Ash's mother put a curse on Sidhean, to someday fall in love with a human girl so he could know the pain he had caused to other women who had fallen under his spell. Sidhean tells Ash she is the girl he has fallen in love with, but that he also senses her feelings toward him have changed.

When her stepmother finally releases her from the cellar Ash learns her books have been burned, except for her mother's book of herbal spells which was hidden in Ash's coat. Ash hopes the book may have some kind of clue about how to break her deal with Sidhean, since she has now realized she does not want to trade her life and wants to stay in the human world with Kaisa. All she finds though are the words "the knowledge will change him" but is not sure this refers to Sidhean. Eventually Ash returns to the city with her stepmother and sisters who warn her she must stay in the house at all times. However, Gwen, a housekeeper Ash is friendly with, convinces her to sneak out for the Yule bonfire and Ash goes in hopes of seeing Kaisa. There Ash learns that the prince is to announce his choice of bride that same night and that Kaisa will be at the palace for the announcement. There Ash finds Kaisa and they share a dance as well as their first kiss. Ash explains that she has to leave to settle a debt and does not know if she will ever come back.

Ash goes to meet Sidhean and tells him that if he truly loves her, he will release her and that she is only willing to spend one night in his world. Sidhean warns Ash that one night in his world is very different from a night in the human world, but Ash says she understands and Sidhean agrees to her terms. Ash asks if this means she will die and Sidhean responds "only a little." The next morning, Ash returns to the house in the city to collect her things. She finds the room she was staying in ransacked, but thinks nothing of it, and even takes time to say goodbye to Clara, the nicer of her stepsisters, who informs her the prince did not choose Ana as his bride. Ash goes to the castle to find Kaisa whom she finds in the stables. Ash tells Kaisa her debt is settled, she is free and they kiss, with Ash promising never to leave again.

== Critical reception ==
Publishers Weekly noted that Ash should "establish Lo as a gifted storyteller". A reviewer for The New York Times described the novel as "a lesbian retelling of Cinderella" and "conventional", but also called it "somber and lovely". Booklist had similar praise, describing the book as a "groundbreaking, gender-mixing retelling" of Cinderella. The Deseret Morning News was less laudatory, noting that "some major elements and plot lines stray far from the beloved story. And one such development could send readers reeling. Parents will want to read the final chapter before handing this book over to their teens." The book was a finalist for the Andre Norton Award, the William C. Morris YA Award, a Lambda Literary Award for LGBT Children's/Young Adult literature and the Mythopoeic Fantasy Award. The book is also a nominee for best novel at the 2010 Northern California Book Awards and a Kirkus Best Young Adult Novel.
