= Poproč, Košice-okolie District =

Poproč Jászómindszent
- Municipality
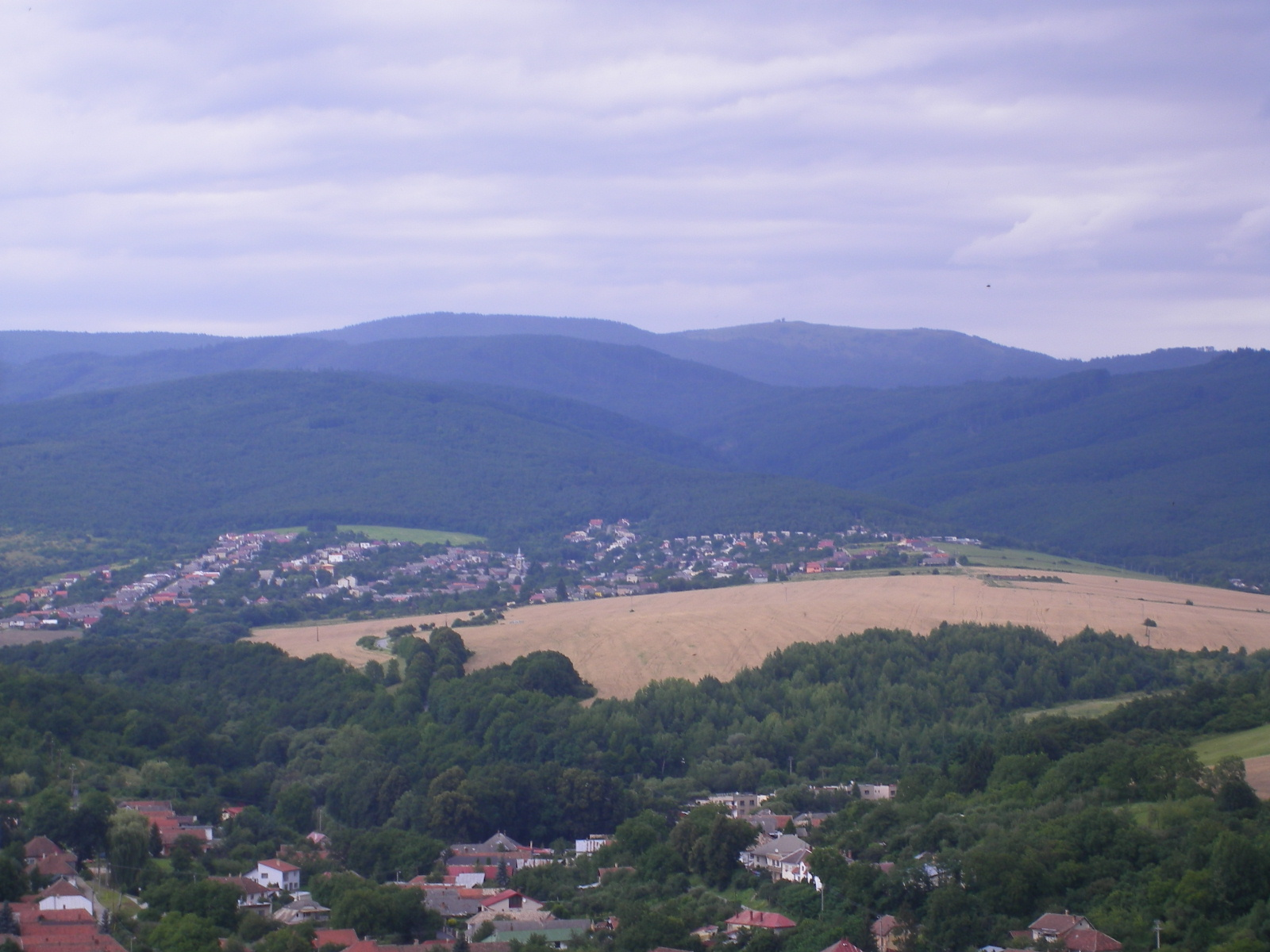

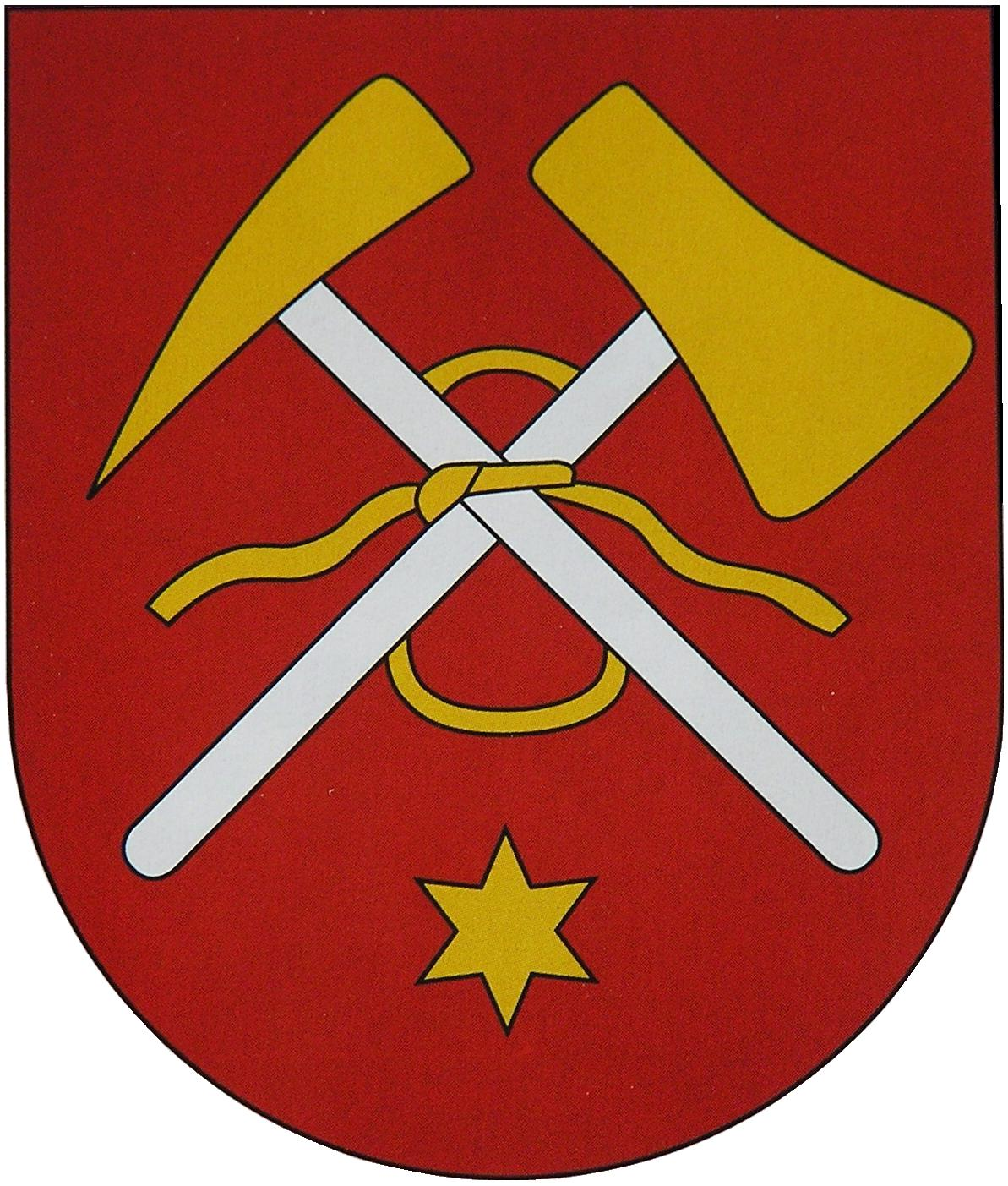
- Flag Coat of arms

- Location of Poproč in the Košice Region Location of Poproč in Slovakia
- Coordinates: 48.71°N 20.97°E
- Country: Slovakia
- Region: Košice Region
- District: Košice-okolie District
- First mentioned: 1255

Government
  - Mayor: Ing. Štefan Jaklovský

Area
  - Total: 26.40 km^{2} (10.19 sq mi)
- Elevation: 363 m (1,191 ft)

Population (2025)
  - Total: 2,644
- Time zone: UTC+1 (CET)
  - Summer (DST): UTC+2 (CEST)
- Postal code: 442 4
- Area code: +421 55
- Vehicle registration plate (until 2022): KS
- Website: poproc.sk

Poproč ([pronunciation: 'poproch]; Hungarian: Jászómindszent) is a village in eastern Slovakia near the town of Košice.

The first written mention about the locality is dated back to 1255 - Poproč is mentioned in the document of the King Béla IV as the royal mining settlement Olchuan.

In the year 2005, Poproč celebrated the 750th anniversary of the first written mention about the village. There were born 15 children (7 boys and 8 girls) in 2005, 32 inhabitants died, 18 moved away from Poproč and 32 inhabitants moved in.

== Some of the historical names of Poproč ==
- 1255 - Olchuan, Elchuan or Elchwan (Latin)
- 1383 - Medzenth
- 1407 - Mendzenth
- 1427 - Menthzenth
- 1481 - Myndzenth
- 1590 - Podprocz aliter Myndzenth
- 1596 - Mindzenth
- 1773 - Mind. Szent (Hungarian)
- 1808 - Podproč (Slovak), Jászo-Mindszent (H)
- 1851 - Podproch
- 1903 - Poproč (SK), Jászómindszent (H)

== Population ==
Population statistic (10 years)
Year	1995	2005	2015	2025
Count	2845	2812	2747	2644
Difference		−1.15%	−2.31%	−3.74%

Population statistic
Year	2024	2025
Count	2647	2644
Difference		−0.11%

It has a population of 2644 people (31 December 2025).

=== Ethnicity ===
Census 2021 (1+ %)
Ethnicity	Number	Fraction
Slovak	2519	93.95%
Not found out	141	5.25%
Total	2681	

In year 2021 was 2681 people by ethnicity 2519 as Slovak, 141 as Not found out, 20 as Hungarian, 17 as Rusyn, 14 as Czech, 9 as German, 5 as Ukrainian, 5 as Other, 4 as Polish, 2 as Italian, 2 as Romani, 2 as Russian, 2 as French and 1 as Vietnamese.

Note on population: The difference values of population numbers in the table "Population statistic" and in the sections "Ethnicity" & "Religion" is caused by the use of various statistical methods.

=== Religion ===
Census 2021 (1+ %)
Religion	Number	Fraction
Roman Catholic Church	1962	73.18%
None	429	16%
Not found out	133	4.96%
Greek Catholic Church	44	1.64%
Total	2681	

In year 2021 was 2681 people by religion 1962 from Roman Catholic Church, 429 from None, 133 from Not found out, 44 from Greek Catholic Church, 24 from Evangelical Church, 22 from Seventh-day Adventist Church, 21 from Eastern Orthodox Church, 12 from Calvinist Church, 10 from Ad hoc movements, 6 from Other and not ascertained christian church, 4 from Paganism and natural spirituality, 4 from Christian Congregations in Slovakia, 2 from Jehovah's Witnesses, 2 from United Methodist Church, 2 from Buddhism, 1 from Jewish community, 1 from Other, 1 from Hinduism and 1 from Baptists Church.

== Notable people ==
- Ladislav Štovčík, footballer
- Frances Jakabcin, Slovak-American community leader
