= Dunmore, Pennsylvania =

Borough in Pennsylvania, US

- Borough
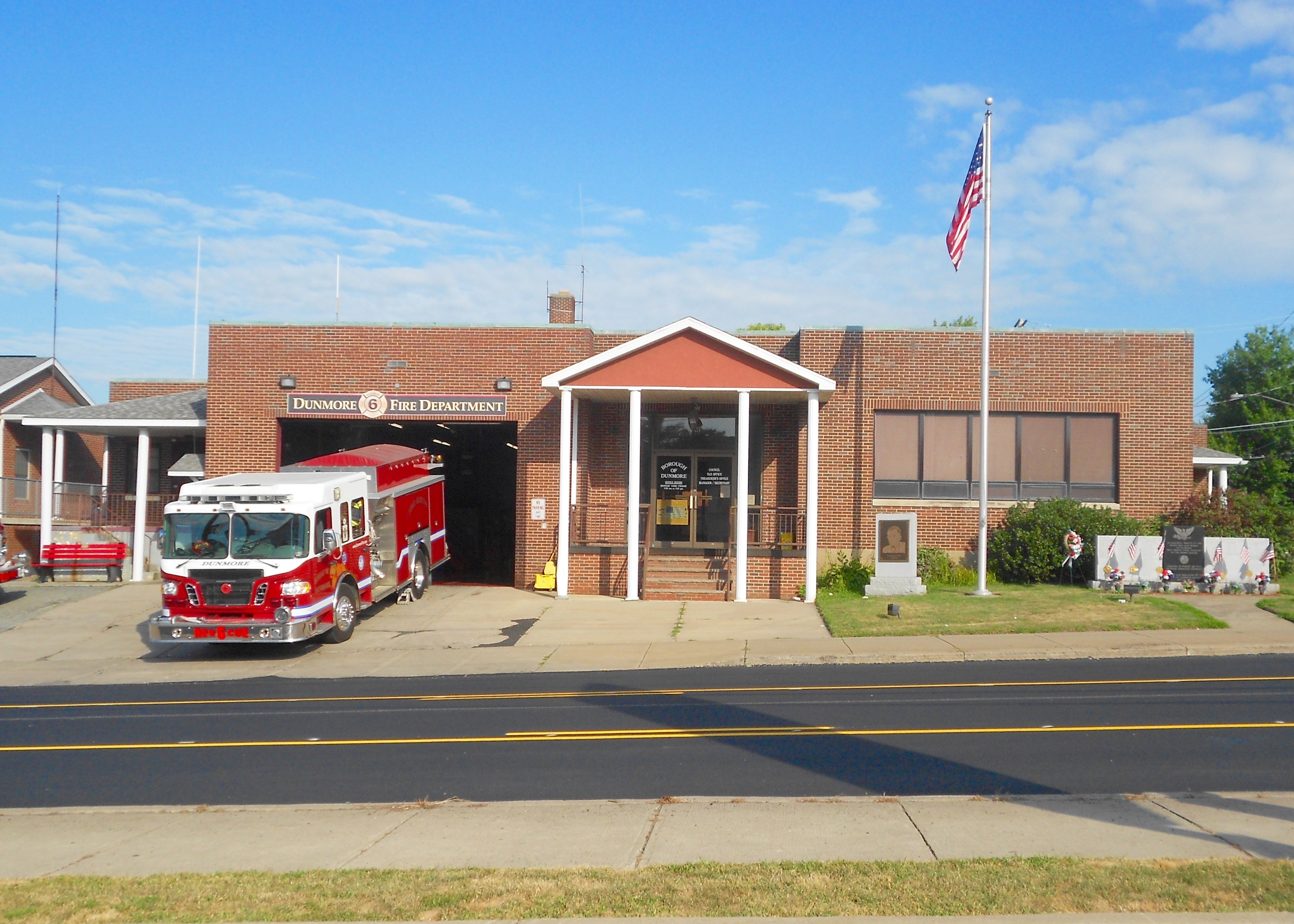
- Dunmore municipal building

- Location of Dunmore in Lackawanna County, Pennsylvania

- Location in Pennsylvania Location in the United States
- Coordinates: 41°25′03″N 75°37′28″W
- Country: United States
- State: Pennsylvania
- County: Lackawanna

Government
  - Mayor: Max Conway (D)

Area
  - Total: 9.00 sq mi (23.30 km^{2})
  - Land: 8.92 sq mi (23.10 km^{2})
  - Water: 0.077 sq mi (0.20 km^{2})
- Elevation: 1,001 ft (305 m)

Population (2020)
  - Total: 14,042
  - Density: 1,574.6/sq mi (607.94/km^{2})
- Time zone: UTC-5 (EST)
  - Summer (DST): UTC-4 (EDT)
- Zip Code: 18512
- Area code: 570
- FIPS code: 42-20352
- Website: www.dunmorepa.gov

Dunmore is a borough in Lackawanna County, Pennsylvania, United States, adjoining Scranton. It is part of Northeastern Pennsylvania and was settled in 1835 and incorporated in 1862. Extensive anthracite coal, brick, stone, and silk interests had led to a rapid increase in the population from 8,315 in 1890 to 23,086 in 1940. The population was 14,042 in the 2020 census.

== History ==
Dunmore was settled in 1835, and incorporated in 1862.

The first European to set foot on Dunmore soil was Count Zinzendorf of Saxony, in 1742, as a missionary to the native people who were Munsee-speaking Lenape.

The territory now encompassing Dunmore was purchased from the natives in 1754 by the Susquehanna Company of Connecticut and became the township of Providence. The first settlers of the Dunmore area arrived in 1771 and were originally from Connecticut (see Pennamite–Yankee War). William Allsworth established an inn here in 1783. In the summer of 1795, Charles Dolph, John Carey, and John West began the labor of clearing and plowing lands in the neighborhood of "Bucktown" or "Corners", as this area was called. Edward Lunnon, Isaac Dolph, James Brown, Philip Swartz and Levi De Puy, purchased land here between 1799 and 1805.

Stephen Tripp, in 1820, began the area's first business, erecting a saw and grist mill on the Roaring Brook half a mile south of the village. That same year, the Drinker Turnpike Company opened a store at the Corners. Shortly after Joseph Tanner opened the first blacksmith shop. C.W. Potter opened the first merchandising house in the village in 1845.

The village consisted of four houses until the Pennsylvania Coal Company, in 1847–1848, turned it into a growing and diverse town. By 1875, the township of Providence was dissolved and the land split up into various smaller boroughs and towns with Dunmore being one of them. Today, Dunmore is a borough bordering the city of Scranton.

The name Dunmore comes from Dunmore Park, in the Falkirk area of Scotland (home of the Dunmore Pineapple).

Golo Footwear had its original manufacturing and design facilities in Dunmore until 1957.

== Geography ==
Dunmore is located at 41°25′3″N 75°37′28″W (41.417530, −75.624432).

According to the United States Census Bureau, the borough has a total area of 9 square miles (23 km^{2}), of which 8.9 square miles (23 km^{2}) is land and 0.1 square miles (0.26 km^{2}) (1.11%) is water.

Roaring Brook flows from the southeast and turns west through the Nay Aug Gorge in Dunmore to the Lackawanna River in Scranton. Most of the borough is drained by Roaring Brook, except for an area in the west drained by Meadow Brook into the Lackawanna River. The southeastern side of the borough is on the slopes of the Moosic Mountains, which the gorge cuts through.

The Lackawanna Railroad operated through the Nay Aug Gorge into Scranton from the Poconos and Northern New Jersey.

== Demographics ==
Historical population
Census	Pop.	Note	%±
1870	4,311		—
1880	5,151		19.5%
1890	8,315		61.4%
1900	12,583		51.3%
1910	17,615		40.0%
1920	20,250		15.0%
1930	22,627		11.7%
1940	23,086		2.0%
1950	20,305		−12.0%
1960	18,917		−6.8%
1970	18,168		−4.0%
1980	16,781		−7.6%
1990	15,403		−8.2%
2000	14,018		−9.0%
2010	14,057		0.3%
2020	14,042		−0.1%

=== 2020 census ===
As of the 2020 census, Dunmore had a population of 14,042. The median age was 42.1 years. 16.7% of residents were under the age of 18 and 21.5% of residents were 65 years of age or older. For every 100 females there were 91.0 males, and for every 100 females age 18 and over there were 87.0 males age 18 and over.

98.9% of residents lived in urban areas, while 1.1% lived in rural areas.

There were 6,026 households in Dunmore, of which 22.7% had children under the age of 18 living in them. Of all households, 39.0% were married-couple households, 21.8% were households with a male householder and no spouse or partner present, and 31.4% were households with a female householder and no spouse or partner present. About 37.2% of all households were made up of individuals and 15.7% had someone living alone who was 65 years of age or older.

There were 6,618 housing units, of which 8.9% were vacant. The homeowner vacancy rate was 0.8% and the rental vacancy rate was 6.9%.

Racial composition as of the 2020 census
Race	Number	Percent
White	12,327	87.8%
Black or African American	370	2.6%
American Indian and Alaska Native	20	0.1%
Asian	524	3.7%
Native Hawaiian and Other Pacific Islander	2	0.0%
Some other race	289	2.1%
Two or more races	510	3.6%
Hispanic or Latino (of any race)	615	4.4%

=== 2010 census ===
As of the 2010 United States census, there were 14,057 people, 5,999 households, and 3,388 families residing in the borough. The population density was 1,579.4 inhabitants per square mile (609.8/km^{2}). There were 6,530 housing units at an average density of 733.7 per square mile (283.3/km^{2}). The racial makeup of the borough was 95.2% White, 1.1% African American, 0.05% Native American, 1.8% Asian, 0.05% Pacific Islander, 0.8% from other races, and 1% from two or more races. Hispanic or Latino of any race were 2.3% of the population.

There were 5,999 households, out of which 22% had children under the age of 18 living with them, 40.6% were married couples living together, 11.5% had a female householder with no husband present, and 43.5% were non-families. 37.9% of all households were made up of individuals, and 16% had someone living alone who was 65 years of age or older. The average household size was 2.18 and the average family size was 2.93.

The ages of the population were 17.9% under the age of 18, 62.1% from 18 to 64, and 20% 65 years or older. The median age was 42.1 years.

The median income for a household in the borough was $33,280, and the median income for a family was $43,354. Males had a median income of $32,855 versus $24,167 for females. The per capita income for the borough was $19,851. About 6.7% of families and 10.5% of the population were below the poverty line, including 11.1% of those under age 18 and 11.8% of those age 65 or over.

== Economy ==
Gertrude Hawk Chocolates, founded in 1936, is based in Dunmore.

The Keystone Industrial Park is also located in Dunmore.

== Environmental issues ==
Keystone Sanitary Landfill, the largest landfill in the state of Pennsylvania has been located in Dunmore since 1973, about 450 feet from the Dunmore Reservoir #1, a backup drinking water supply. In 1987, it extended to Throop, Pennsylvania. The landfill was built over mines known for ground subsidence. As of 2015 the landfill accepts over 7,200 tons of trash per day. More than a third of its in-state waste since 2009 is from fracking drill cuttings, drilling mud and fluids. Cuttings are mixed with small amounts of naturally occurring radioactive elements, particularly radium-226. The landfill has been leaking into ground water per its Phase 3 permit application. Run-off is discharged into Eddy's Creek and the Lackawanna River.

In November 2014, the Dunmore borough council approved a $15.63 million agreement for Keystone as a basis for an extension, and a definition of the landfill as a “pre-existing landfill” to ensure Keystone a more favorable interpretation of the borough's zoning ordinance against public opinion.

On September 20, 2018, Pennsylvania DEP issued a Notice of Violation to Keystone for storing leachate in excess of 25% of its total leachate storage capacity on a regular basis since October 2016.

== Infrastructure ==
=== Education ===
==== Public schools ====
Dunmore has one public school district, Dunmore School District, with three sections that are based on age: Dunmore Elementary Center, Dunmore Middle School and Dunmore High School. The principal of the Elementary Center is Matthew Quinn, the principal of the High School is Timothy Hopkins, and the Superintendent of Schools is John Marichak.

==== Parochial schools ====
Dunmore has two Roman Catholic schools, under the administration of the Diocese of Scranton: Saint Mary's of Mount Carmel Elementary School (PK-8), led by principal Mary Elizabeth Shattin, and Holy Cross High School. The current principal of Holy Cross High School is Benjamin Tolerico, their vice-principal is Cathy Chiumento and their dean of students is Kandy Taylor. They also have a school chaplain, Rev. Cyril Edwards.

==== Post-secondary schools ====
Marywood University is partially located in Dunmore.

Penn State Scranton is located in Dunmore.

=== Transportation ===
The western terminus of Interstate 84 is in Dunmore. I-84/I-380 follows the Nay Aug Gorge westward towards the spaghetti junction interchange with Interstate 81 and U.S. Route 6. I-81 also has an interchange with Route 347 in Dunmore.

== Notable people ==
- Mehmood Ali (1932–2004), actor, "India's Comedy King", died in Dunmore
- Sister Mary Adrian Barrett, I.H.M. (1929–2015), Catholic social worker and educator
- Christopher F. Burne, U.S. Air Force brigadier general
- Clare Horan Cawley (1874–1921), pianist
- Nestor Chylak (1922–1982), Major League Baseball umpire
- Vic Delmore (1917–1960), Major League Baseball umpire
- Carol Ann Drazba (1943–1966), first American nurse to die in the Vietnam War
- Vic Fangio, defensive coordinator of the Philadelphia Eagles in the National Football League
- Eugene A. Garvey (1845–1920), bishop of Altoona
- Frances Jakabcin (1875–1933), president of First Catholic Ladies Slovak Union
- Joseph Kopacz (born 1950), Bishop of Jackson, Mississippi
- Ruth Earnshaw Lo (1910–2006), professor and writer, based in China 1937 to 1977
- Jeanne Marrazzo, microbiologist, director of the University of Alabama School of Medicine Division of Infectious Diseases
- Joe Mooney, Major League Baseball groundskeeper for more than three decades; Boston Red Sox Hall of Fame member
- John Willard Raught (1857–1931), landscape artist
- Paul W. Richards, astronaut who flew on Mission STS-102 on board the Space Shuttle Discovery
- John Francis Ropek (1917–2009), oceanographer for the first under-ice polar expedition of USS Nautilus (SSN-571)
- Tim Ruddy, center for NFL's Miami Dolphins from 1994 to 2003; for most of career was center of Pro Football Hall of Fame quarterback Dan Marino
- Beverly Tyler (1927–2005), actress and singer
- Junior Walsh (1919–1990), professional baseball player for Pittsburgh Pirates

== Gallery ==
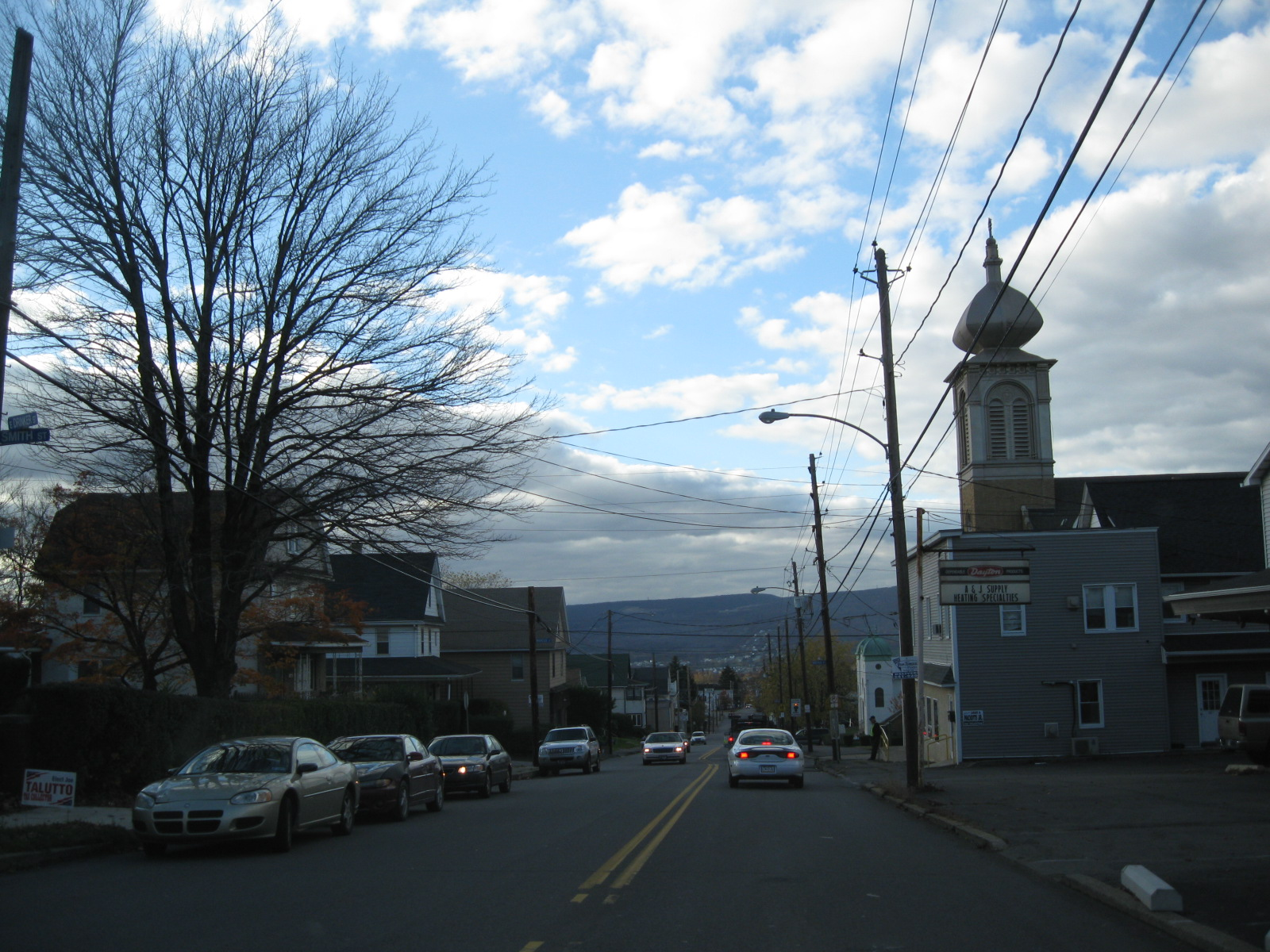
Drinker Street in Dunmore

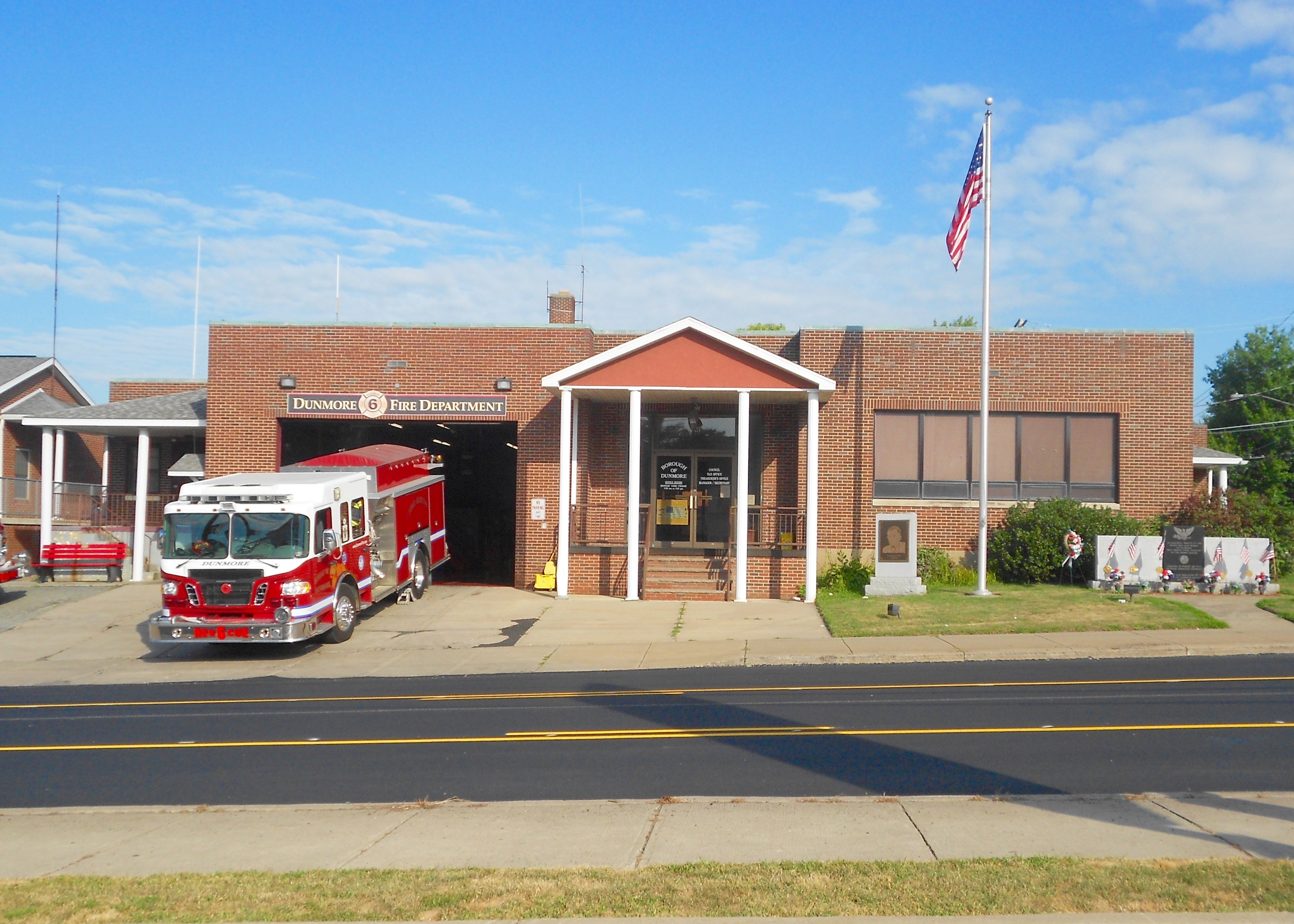
Dunmore fire station

== See also ==
- Jefferson Center Dunmore
