= Lambda Literary Award for Mystery =

Annual literary award for mystery novels with LGBT-themes

- Awarded for: LGBT Mystery
- Sponsored by: Lambda Literary Foundation
- Date: Annual

The Lambda Literary Award for Mystery is an annual literary award, presented by the Lambda Literary Foundation, to a mystery novel by or about people in the LGBT community. Prior to 2021, the award was separated into separate categories for Gay and Lesbian Mystery.

== Recipients ==
Official Category Title	Abbreviation	Award Year(s)
Lesbian Mystery/Science Fiction	Lesb. M/SF	1989
Gay Mystery/Science Fiction	Gay M/SF	1989
Lesbian Mystery	Lesbian Mys.	1990-2020
Gay Mystery	Gay Mys.	1990-2020
LGBTQ Mystery	LGBTQ	2021

Lambda Literary Award for Mystery finalists and winners
Year	Category	Author	Title	Result	Ref.
1989	Gay M/SF	Michael Nava	Goldenboy	Winner	
1989	Gay M/SF	Donald Ward	Death Takes the Stage	Finalist	
1989	Gay M/SF	Joseph Hansen	Obedience	Finalist	
1989	Gay M/SF	Michael Bishop	Unicorn Mountain	Finalist	
1989	Gay M/SF	George Baxt	Who's Next	Finalist	
1989	Lesb. M/SF	Antoinette Azolakov	Skiptrace	Winner	
1989	Lesb. M/SF	Sandy Bayer	The Crystal Curtain	Finalist	
1989	Lesb. M/SF	Dolores Klaich	Heavy Gilt	Finalist	
1989	Lesb. M/SF	Claire McNab	Lessons In Murder	Finalist	
1989	Lesb. M/SF	Judy Grahn	Mundane's World	Finalist	
1990	Gay Mys.	Mark Richard Zubro	Simple Suburban Murder	Winner	
1990	Gay Mys.	Samuel M. Steward	Caravaggio Shawl	Finalist	
1990	Gay Mys.	Stan Leventhal	Faultlines: Stories of Suspense	Finalist	
1990	Gay Mys.	Michael Nava	Finale edited	Finalist	
1990	Gay Mys.	Jeffrey N. McMahan	Somewhere in the Night	Finalist	
1990	Lesbian Mys.	Katherine V. Forrest	The Beverly Malibu	Winner	
1990	Lesbian Mys.	Antoinette Azolakov	The Contactees Die Young	Finalist	
1990	Lesbian Mys.	Barbara Wilson	Dog Collar Murders	Finalist	
1990	Lesbian Mys.	Claire McNab	Fatal Reunion	Finalist	
1990	Lesbian Mys.	Ellen Hart	Hallowed Murder	Finalist	
1991	Gay Mys.	Michael Nava	Howtown	Winner	
1991	Gay Mys.	Stan Leventhal	Black Marble Pool	Finalist	
1991	Gay Mys.	Grant Michaels	Body To Dye For	Finalist	
1991	Gay Mys.	Joseph Hansen	Boy Who Was Buried This Morning	Finalist	
1991	Gay Mys.	Mark Richard Zubro	Why Isn't Becky Twitchell Dead?	Finalist	
1991	Lesbian Mys.	Barbara Wilson	Gaudi Afternoon	Winner (tie)	
1991	Lesbian Mys.	Lauren Wright Douglas	Ninth Life	Winner (tie)	
1991	Lesbian Mys.	Sarah Dreher	A Captive In Time	Finalist	
1991	Lesbian Mys.	Claire McNab	Death Down Under	Finalist	
1991	Lesbian Mys.	Camarin Grae	Slick	Finalist	
1992	Gay Mys.	Joseph Hansen	A Country of Old Men	Winner	
1992	Gay Mys.	Stan Cutler	Best Performance by a Patsy	Finalist	
1992	Gay Mys.	Larry Townsend	Master's Counterpoints	Finalist	
1992	Gay Mys.	Mark Richard Zubro	Sorry Now?	Finalist	
1992	Gay Mys.	Stan Cutler	The Face on the Cutting Room Floor	Finalist	
1992	Lesbian Mys.	Katherine V. Forrest	Murder by Tradition	Winner	
1992	Lesbian Mys.	Claire McNab	Cop Out	Finalist	
1992	Lesbian Mys.	Amanda Kyle Williams	The Providence File	Finalist	
1992	Lesbian Mys.	Sandra Scoppetone	Everything You Have is Mine	Finalist	
1992	Lesbian Mys.	Mary Morell	Final Session	Finalist	
1993	Gay Mys.	Michael Nava	The Hidden Law	Winner	
1993	Gay Mys.	Steve Johnson	Final Atonement	Finalist	
1993	Gay Mys.	Grant Michaels	Love You to Death	Finalist	
1993	Gay Mys.	Larry Townsend	One for the Master, Two for the Fool	Finalist	
1993	Gay Mys.	Richard Stevenson	Third Man Out	Finalist	
1993	Lesbian Mys.	Jaye Maiman	Crazy for Loving	Winner (tie)	
1993	Lesbian Mys.	Elizabeth Pincus	Two-Bit Tango	Winner (tie)	
1993	Lesbian Mys.	J. M. Redmann	Deaths of Jocasta	Finalist	
1993	Lesbian Mys.	Nikki Baker	Lavender House Murder	Finalist	
1993	Lesbian Mys.	Ellen Hart	Stage Fright	Finalist	
1994	Gay Mys.	Steven Saylor	Catilina's Riddle	Winner	
1994	Gay Mys.	Joseph Hansen	Bohannon's Country	Finalist	
1994	Gay Mys.	Grant Michaels	Dead On Your Feet	Finalist	
1994	Gay Mys.	George Baxt	Mae West Murder Case	Finalist	
1994	Gay Mys.	John Cooke	Torsos	Finalist	
1994	Lesbian Mys.	Mary Wings	Divine Victim	Winner	
1994	Lesbian Mys.	Mabel Maney	Case of the Not-So-Nice Nurse	Finalist	
1994	Lesbian Mys.	Sandra Scoppetone	I'll Be Leaving You Always	Finalist	
1994	Lesbian Mys.	Nikki Baker	Long Goodbyes	Finalist	
1994	Lesbian Mys.	Barbara Wilson	Trouble In Transylvania	Finalist	
1995	Gay Mys.	John Berendt	Midnight in the Garden of Good and Evil	Winner	
1995	Gay Mys.	Samuel Delaney	Mad Man	Finalist	
1995	Gay Mys.	Grant Michaels	Mask for a Diva	Finalist	
1995	Gay Mys.	George Baxt	Queer Kind of Love	Finalist	
1995	Gay Mys.	Caleb Carr	The Alienist	Finalist	
1995	Lesbian Mys.	Ellen Hart	Small Sacrifice	Winner	
1995	Lesbian Mys.	Claire McNab	Body Guard	Finalist	
1995	Lesbian Mys.	Mabel Maney	Case of the Good-For-Nothing Girlfriend	Finalist	
1995	Lesbian Mys.	Sandra Scoppetone	My Sweet Untraceable You	Finalist	
1995	Lesbian Mys.	Randye Lordon	Sister's Keeper	Finalist	
1996	Gay Mys.	R. D. Zimmerman	Closet	Winner	
1996	Gay Mys.	Mark Richard Zubro	Another Dead Teenager	Finalist	
1996	Gay Mys.	George Baxt	Queer Kind of Umbrella	Finalist	
1996	Gay Mys.	Richard Stevenson	Shock to the System	Finalist	
1996	Gay Mys.	Steven Saylor	The Venus Throw	Finalist	
1996	Lesbian Mys.	J. M. Redmann	The Intersection of Law and Desire	Winner	
1996	Lesbian Mys.	Jaye Maiman	Baby, It's Cold	Finalist	
1996	Lesbian Mys.	Ellen Hart	Faint Praise	Finalist	
1996	Lesbian Mys.	Elizabeth Pincus	Hangdog Hustle	Finalist	
1996	Lesbian Mys.	Penny Mickelbury	Night Songs	Finalist	
1996	Lesbian Mys.	Jaye Maiman	Someone to Watch	Finalist	
1997	Gay Mys.	Michael Nava	Death of Friends	Winner	
1997	Gay Mys.	Steven Saylor	Murder on the Appian Way	Finalist	
1997	Gay Mys.	John Morgan Wilson	Simple Justice	Finalist	
1997	Gay Mys.	Grant Michaels	Time to Check Out	Finalist	
1997	Gay Mys.	R. D. Zimmerman	Tribe	Finalist	
1997	Lesbian Mys.	Ellen Hart	Robber's Wine	Winner	
1997	Lesbian Mys.	Jackie Manthorne	Final Take	Finalist	
1997	Lesbian Mys.	Claire McNab	Inner Circle	Finalist	
1997	Lesbian Mys.	Katherine V. Forrest	Liberty Square	Finalist	
1998	Gay Mys.	David Hunt	The Magician's Tale	Winner	
1998	Gay Mys.	Christopher Bram	Gossip	Finalist	
1998	Gay Mys.	R. D. Zimmerman	Hostage	Finalist	
1998	Gay Mys.	John Morgan Wilson	Revision of Justice	Finalist	
1998	Gay Mys.	Michael Nava	The Burning Plain	Finalist	
1998	Lesbian Mys.	Randye Lordon	Father Forgive Me	Winner	
1998	Lesbian Mys.	Katherine V. Forrest	Apparition Alley	Finalist	
1998	Lesbian Mys.	Carole laFavor	Evil Dead Center	Finalist	
1998	Lesbian Mys.	Cynthia Webb	No Daughter of the South	Finalist	
1998	Lesbian Mys.	Jaye Maiman	Old Black Magic	Finalist	
1999	Gay Mys.	R. D. Zimmerman	Outburst	Winner	
1999	Gay Mys.	Grant Michaels	Dead as a Doornail	Finalist	
1999	Gay Mys.	Fred Hunter	Federal Fag	Finalist	
1999	Gay Mys.	Richard Stevenson	Strachey's Folly	Finalist	
1999	Gay Mys.	Randy Boyd	Uprising	Finalist	
1999	Lesbian Mys.	Nicola Griffith	The Blue Place	Winner	
1999	Lesbian Mys.	Randye Lordon	Mother May I	Finalist	
1999	Lesbian Mys.	Claire McNab	Past Due	Finalist	
1999	Lesbian Mys.	Sarah Dreher	Shaman's Moon	Finalist	
1999	Lesbian Mys.	Ellen Hart	Wicked Games	Finalist	
2000	Gay Mys.	John Morgan Wilson	Justice at Risk	Winner	
2000	Gay Mys.	Mark Zubro	Drop Dead	Finalist	
2000	Gay Mys.	R. D. Zimmerman	Innuendo	Finalist	
2000	Gay Mys.	Lev Raphael	The Death of a Constant Lover	Finalist	
2000	Gay Mys.	Keith Hartman	The Gumshoe, the Witch, and the Virtual Corpse	Finalist	
2000	Lesbian Mys.	Ellen Hart	Hunting the Witch	Winner	
2000	Lesbian Mys.	J. M. Redmann	Lost Daughters	Finalist	
2000	Lesbian Mys.	Claire McNab	Murder Undercover	Finalist	
2000	Lesbian Mys.	Mary Wings	She Came in Drag	Finalist	
2000	Lesbian Mys.	Katherine V. Forrest	Sleeping Bones	Finalist	
2001	Gay Mys.	John Morgan Wilson	The Limits of Justice	Winner	
2001	Gay Mys.	Christopher Rice	A Density of Souls	Finalist	
2001	Gay Mys.	Krandall Kraus	Love's Last Chance	Finalist	
2001	Gay Mys.	Michael Craft	Name Games	Finalist	
2001	Gay Mys.	Casey Nelson	Nothing Gold Can Stay	Finalist	
2001	Lesbian Mys.	Jean Marcy	Mommy Deadest	Winner	
2001	Lesbian Mys.	Val McDermid	Booked for Murder	Finalist	
2001	Lesbian Mys.	Barbara Wilson	The Case of the Orphanned Bassoonists	Finalist	
2001	Lesbian Mys.	Claire McNab	Death Understood	Finalist	
2001	Lesbian Mys.	Therese Szymanski	When Evil Changes Face	Finalist	
2002	Gay Mys.	Michael Nava	Rag and Bone	Winner	
2002	Gay Mys.	Michael Craft	Boy Toy	Finalist	
2002	Gay Mys.	Warren Dunford	Making a Killing	Finalist	
2002	Gay Mys.	Mark Richard Zubro	Sex and Murder.Com	Finalist	
2002	Gay Mys.	Dorien Grey	The Butcher's Son	Finalist	
2002	Lesbian Mys.	Ellen Hart	Merchant of Venus	Winner	
2002	Lesbian Mys.	Alex Marcoux	Back to Salem	Finalist	
2002	Lesbian Mys.	Mabel Maney	Kiss the Girls and Make Them Spy	Finalist	
2002	Lesbian Mys.	Pat Welch	Moving Targets	Finalist	
2002	Lesbian Mys.	Lauren Maddison	Witchfire	Finalist	
2003	Gay Mys.	Christopher Rice	The Snow Garden	Winner	
2003	Gay Mys.	Michael Craft	Hot Spot	Finalist	
2003	Gay Mys.	Greg Herren	Murder in the Rue Dauphine	Finalist	
2003	Gay Mys.	Dorien Grey	The Hired Man	Finalist	
2003	Gay Mys.	Drew Gummerson	The Lodger	Finalist	
2003	Lesbian Mys.	Elizabeth Woodcraft	Good Bad Woman	Winner (tie)	
2003	Lesbian Mys.	Ellen Hart	Immaculate Midnight	Winner (tie)	
2003	Lesbian Mys.	Claire McNab	Accidental Murder	Finalist	
2003	Lesbian Mys.	Heather Dune Macadam	The Weeping Buddha	Finalist	
2003	Lesbian Mys.	Lauren Maddison	Death by Prophecy	Finalist	
2004	Gay Mys.	John Morgan Wilson	Blind Eye	Winner	
2004	Gay Mys.	Greg Herren	Bourbon Street Blues	Finalist	
2004	Gay Mys.	Mark Richard Zubro	Dead Egotistical Morons	Finalist	
2004	Gay Mys.	Elliott Mackle	It Takes Two	Finalist	
2004	Gay Mys.	David Stukas	Wearing Black to the White Party	Finalist	
2004	Lesbian Mys.	Elizabeth Sims	Damn Straight	Winner	
2004	Lesbian Mys.	Baxter Clare	Cry Havoc	Finalist	
2004	Lesbian Mys.	Bett Reece Johnson	The Woman Who Found Grace	Finalist	
2004	Lesbian Mys.	Lauren Maddison	Epitaph for an Angel	Finalist	
2004	Lesbian Mys.	Ida Swearingen	Owl of the Desert	Finalist	
2005	Gay Mys.	Anthony Bidulka	Flight of Aquavit	Winner	
2005	Gay Mys.	Greg Herren	Jackson Square Jazz	Finalist	
2005	Gay Mys.	John Morgan Wilson	Moth and Flame	Finalist	
2005	Gay Mys.	Gary Zebrun	Someone You Know	Finalist	
2005	Gay Mys.	Dorien Grey	The Role Players	Finalist	
2005	Lesbian Mys.	Katherine V. Forrest	Hancock Park	Winner	
2005	Lesbian Mys.	Ellen Hart	An Intimate Ghost	Finalist	
2005	Lesbian Mys.	Jennifer L. Jordan	Commitment to Die	Finalist	
2005	Lesbian Mys.	Claire McNab	The Wombat Strategy	Finalist	
2005	Lesbian Mys.	Mary Vermillion	Death by Discount	Finalist	
2006	Gay Mys.	D. Travers Scott	One of These Things is Not Like the Other	Winner	
2006	Gay Mys.	W. Randy Haynes	Cajun Snuff	Finalist	
2006	Gay Mys.	Rick Copp	The Actor's Guide to Greed	Finalist	
2006	Gay Mys.	Dorien Grey	The Paper Mirror	Finalist	
2006	Gay Mys.	Michael Allen Dymmoch	White Tiger	Finalist	
2006	Lesbian Mys.	Alicia Gaspar De Alba	Desert Blood: The Juarez Murders	Winner	
2006	Lesbian Mys.	Penny Mickelbury	Darkness Descending	Finalist	
2006	Lesbian Mys.	Ellen Hart	The Iron Girl	Finalist	
2006	Lesbian Mys.	Radclyffe	Justice Served	Finalist	
2006	Lesbian Mys.	Katherine V. Forrest	Women of Mystery	Finalist	
2007	Gay Mys.	Garry Ryan	The Lucky Elephant Restaurant	Winner	
2007	Gay Mys.	Greg Herren	Mardi Gras Mambo	Finalist	
2007	Gay Mys.	Randall Peffer	Provincetown Follies, Bangkok Blues	Finalist	
2007	Gay Mys.	James Lear	The Back Passage	Finalist	
2007	Gay Mys.	Josh Lanyon	The Hell You Say	Finalist	
2007	Lesbian Mys.	Laurie R. King	The Art of Detection	Winner	
2007	Lesbian Mys.	Jessica Thomas	The Weekend Visitor	Finalist	
2007	Lesbian Mys.	Joan Opyr	Idaho Code	Finalist	
2007	Lesbian Mys.	Ellen Hart	Night Vision	Finalist	
2007	Lesbian Mys.	Rose Beecham	Sleep of Reason	Finalist	
2008	Gay Mys.	Greg Herren	Murder in the Rue Chartres	Winner	
2008	Gay Mys.	Chris Beakey	Double Abduction	Finalist	
2008	Gay Mys.	Caro Soles	Drag Queen in the Court of Death	Finalist	
2008	Gay Mys.	Neil Plakcy	Mahu Surfer	Finalist	
2008	Gay Mys.	Roberto Ferrari	Pierce	Finalist	
2008	Gay Mys.	Anthony Bidulka	Stain of the Berry	Finalist	
2008	Lesbian Mys.	Gabrielle Goldsby	Wall of Silence	Winner	
2008	Lesbian Mys.	Gerri Hill	In the Name of the Father	Finalist	
2008	Lesbian Mys.	Ursula Steck	Laura's War	Finalist	
2008	Lesbian Mys.	Ellen Hart	Mortal Groove	Finalist	
2008	Lesbian Mys.	Jennifer L. Jordan	Selective Memory	Finalist	
2009	Gay Mys.	Scott Sherman	First You Fall	Winner	
2009	Gay Mys.	Neil Plakcy	Mahu Fire	Finalist	
2009	Gay Mys.	John Morgan Wilson	Spider Season	Finalist	
2009	Gay Mys.	Anthony Bidulka	Sundowner Ubuntu	Finalist	
2009	Gay Mys.	Stephen Anable	The Fisher Boy	Finalist	
2009	Lesbian Mys.	Josie Gordon	Whacked	Winner	
2009	Lesbian Mys.	Diane Anderson-Minshall	Blind Faith	Finalist	
2009	Lesbian Mys.	Ali Vali	Calling the Dead	Finalist	
2009	Lesbian Mys.	Jessica Thomas	Losers Weepers	Finalist	
2009	Lesbian Mys.	Ellen Hart	Sweet Poison	Finalist	
2010	Gay Mys.	Michael Thomas Ford	What We Remember	Winner	
2010	Gay Mys.	Josh Aterovis	All Lost Things	Finalist	
2010	Gay Mys.	Ralph Ashworth	Killer of Orchids	Finalist	
2010	Gay Mys.	Greg Herren	Murder in the Garden District	Finalist	
2010	Gay Mys.	Rob Byrnes	Straight Lies	Finalist	
2010	Lesbian Mys.	J. M. Redmann	Death of a Dying Man	Winner	
2010	Lesbian Mys.	Paulette Callen	Command of Silence	Finalist	
2010	Lesbian Mys.	Ellen Hart	The Mirror and the Mask	Finalist	
2010	Lesbian Mys.	Joan Opyr	From Hell to Breakfast	Finalist	
2010	Lesbian Mys.	Josie Gordon	Toasted	Finalist	
2011	Gay Mys.	David Lennon	Echoes	Winner	
2011	Gay Mys.	Richard Stevenson	Cockeyed	Finalist	
2011	Gay Mys.	I.E. Woodward	Rubber Baby Buggy Bumpers	Finalist	
2011	Gay Mys.	Garry Ryan	Smoked	Finalist	
2011	Gay Mys.	Greg Herren	Vieux Carre Voodoo	Finalist	
2011	Lesbian Mys.	Val McDermid	Fever of the Bone	Winner	
2011	Lesbian Mys.	Ellen Hart	The Cruel Ever After	Finalist	
2011	Lesbian Mys.	Kim Baldwin	Missing Lynx	Finalist	
2011	Lesbian Mys.	Stella Duffy	Parallel Lies	Finalist	
2011	Lesbian Mys.	J. M. Redmann	Water Mark	Finalist	
2012	Gay Mys.	Richard Stevenson	Red White Black and Blue	Winner	
2012	Gay Mys.	David Lennon	Blue's Bayou	Finalist	
2012	Gay Mys.	Marshall Thornton	Boystown: Three Nick Nowak Mysteries	Finalist	
2012	Gay Mys.	Garry Ryan	Malabarista	Finalist	
2012	Gay Mys.	Jess Faraday	The Affair of the Porcelain Dog	Finalist	
2012	Lesbian Mys.	Kim Baldwin	Dying to Live	Winner	
2012	Lesbian Mys.	AJ Quinn	Hostage Moon	Finalist	
2012	Lesbian Mys.	R. E. Bradshaw	Rainey Nights: A Rainey Bell Thriller	Finalist	
2012	Lesbian Mys.	Martha Miller	Retirement Plan	Finalist	
2012	Lesbian Mys.	Val McDermid	Trick of the Dark	Finalist	
2013	Gay Mys.	Jeffrey Round	Lake on the Mountain: A Dan Sharp Mystery	Winner	
2013	Gay Mys.	Rod Shelton	Bokassa's Last Apostle	Finalist	
2013	Gay Mys.	Anthony Bidulka	Dos Equis	Finalist	
2013	Gay Mys.	Janice Law	Fires of London	Finalist	
2013	Gay Mys.	Steve Neil Johnson	The Yellow Canary	Finalist	
2013	Lesbian Mys.	J. M. Redmann	Ill Will	Winner	
2013	Lesbian Mys.	C.P. Rowlands	Jacob's War	Finalist	
2013	Lesbian Mys.	Robin Silverman	Lemon Reef	Finalist	
2013	Lesbian Mys.	R. E. Bradshaw	Molly: House on Fire	Finalist	
2013	Lesbian Mys.	Ellen Hart	Rest for the Wicked	Finalist	
2014	Gay Mys.	Janice Law	The Prisoner of the Riviera: A Francis Bacon Mystery	Winner	
2014	Gay Mys.	Greg Herren	Baton Rouge Bingo	Finalist	
2014	Gay Mys.	Marshall Thornton	Boystown 5: Murder Book	Finalist	
2014	Gay Mys.	David Lennon	Fierce	Finalist	
2014	Gay Mys.	Garry Ryan	Foxed	Finalist	
2014	Gay Mys.	Jonathan Gregory	In Real Life, The 3rd Gemini & Flowers Mystery	Finalist	
2014	Gay Mys.	Mark Zubro	Pawn of Satan	Finalist	
2014	Gay Mys.	Jon Michaelsen	Pretty Boy Dead	Finalist	
2014	Gay Mys.	Sarah Black	The General and the Elephant Clock of Al-Jazari	Finalist	
2014	Lesbian Mys.	Katherine V. Forrest	High Desert	Winner	
2014	Lesbian Mys.	Val McDermid	Cross and Burn	Finalist	
2014	Lesbian Mys.	Anne Holt	Death of the Demon	Finalist	
2014	Lesbian Mys.	Laura Antoniou	The Killer Wore Leather: A Mystery	Finalist	
2014	Lesbian Mys.	Ann Roberts	Point of Betrayal	Finalist	
2014	Lesbian Mys.	R. E. Bradshaw	The Rainey Season	Finalist	
2014	Lesbian Mys.	Jean Sheldon	She Overheard Murder	Finalist	
2014	Lesbian Mys.	Ellen Hart	Taken by the Wind	Finalist	
2014	Lesbian Mys.	Jenna Rae	Turning on the Tide	Finalist	
2014	Lesbian Mys.	Diane Wood	Web of Obsessions	Finalist	
2014	Lesbian Mys.	Ian Hamilton	The Wild Beasts of Wuhan: An Ava Lee Novel	Finalist	
2015	Gay Mys.	Katie Gilmartin	Blackmail, My Love: A Murder Mystery	Winner	
2015	Gay Mys.	Jameson Currier	A Gathering Storm	Finalist	
2015	Gay Mys.	Marshall Thornton	Boystown 6: From the Ashes	Finalist	
2015	Gay Mys.	David Swatling	Calvin's Head	Finalist	
2015	Gay Mys.	David Lennon	DeadFall	Finalist	
2015	Gay Mys.	Josh Lanyon	Fair Game	Finalist	
2015	Gay Mys.	Janice Law	Moon Over Tangier	Finalist	
2015	Gay Mys.	Rafe Haze	The Next	Finalist	
2015	Lesbian Mys.	Ellen Hart	The Old Deep and Dark	Winner	
2015	Lesbian Mys.	Anne Laughlin	The Acquittal	Finalist	
2015	Lesbian Mys.	Charles Atkins	Done to Death	Finalist	
2015	Lesbian Mys.	Valerie Bronwen	Slash and Burn	Finalist	
2015	Lesbian Mys.	Stevie Mikayne	UnCatholic Conduct	Finalist	
2016	Gay Mys.	Marshall Thornton	Boystown 7: Bloodlines	Winner	
2016	Gay Mys.	Jeffrey Round	After the Horses	Finalist	
2016	Gay Mys.	Jon Wilson	Cheap as Beasts	Finalist	
2016	Gay Mys.	Wallace Godfrey	Introducing Sunfish & Starfish: Tropical Drag Queen Detectives	Finalist	
2016	Gay Mys.	Rhys Ford	Murder and Mayhem	Finalist	
2016	Gay Mys.	Christopher Bollen	Orient	Finalist	
2016	Gay Mys.	Tom Mendicino	The Boys from Eighth and Carpenter	Finalist	
2016	Gay Mys.	Robert Karjel	The Swede	Finalist	
2016	Lesbian Mys.	Victoria Brownworth	Ordinary Mayhem	Winner (tie)	
2016	Lesbian Mys.	Ann Aptaker	Tarnished Gold	Winner (tie)	
2016	Lesbian Mys.	Ellen Hart	The Grave Soul	Finalist	
2016	Lesbian Mys.	Lee Winter	The Red Files	Finalist	
2016	Lesbian Mys.	Debra Hyde	The Tattered Heiress: Volume Two of the Charlotte Olmes Mystery Series	Finalist	
2016	Lesbian Mys.	Stevie Mikayne	Illicit Artifacts	Finalist	
2016	Lesbian Mys.	Cari Hunter	No Good Reason	Finalist	
2016	Lesbian Mys.	R. E. Bradshaw	Relatively Rainey	Finalist	
2017	Gay Mys.	J. Aaron Sanders	Speakers of the Dead: A Walt Whitman Mystery	Winner	
2017	Gay Mys.	Dal Maclean	Bitter Legacy	Finalist	
2017	Gay Mys.	L. A. Fields	Homo Superiors	Finalist	
2017	Gay Mys.	Michael Nava	Lay Your Sleeping Head	Finalist	
2017	Gay Mys.	Janice Law	Nights in Berlin	Finalist	
2017	Lesbian Mys.	Jessica L. Webb	Pathogen	Winner	
2017	Lesbian Mys.	Jessie Chandler	Blood Money Murder	Finalist	
2017	Lesbian Mys.	Cheryl A. Head	Bury Me When I'm Dead	Finalist	
2017	Lesbian Mys.	Andrea Bramhall	Collide-O-Scope	Finalist	
2017	Lesbian Mys.	Lynn Ames	Final Cut	Finalist	
2017	Lesbian Mys.	Lee Winter	Requiem for Immortals	Finalist	
2017	Lesbian Mys.	Jennifer L. Jordan	Under Contract	Finalist	
2017	Lesbian Mys.	T. L. Hart	Walk-in	Finalist	
2018	Gay Mys.	Marshall Thornton	Night Drop	Winner	
2018	Gay Mys.	Marshall Thornton	Boystown 10: Gifts Given	Finalist	
2018	Gay Mys.	Kim Fielding	Love is Heartless	Finalist	
2018	Gay Mys.	Mark Zubro	Ring of Silence	Finalist	
2018	Gay Mys.	Michael Nava	Street People	Finalist	
2018	Gay Mys.	C. S. Poe	The Mystery of the Curiosities	Finalist	
2018	Gay Mys.	Rhys Ford	Tramps and Thieves	Finalist	
2018	Gay Mys.	Kate Sherwood	Long Shadows	Finalist	
2018	Lesbian Mys.	A. E. Radley	Huntress	Winner	
2018	Lesbian Mys.	J. M. Redmann	The Girl on the Edge of Summer	Finalist	
2018	Lesbian Mys.	Andrea Bramhall	The Last First Time	Finalist	
2018	Lesbian Mys.	Cari Hunter	A Quiet Death	Finalist	
2018	Lesbian Mys.	Ellen Hart	Fever in the Dark	Finalist	
2018	Lesbian Mys.	Kate Jessica Raphael	Murder Under the Fig Tree: A Palestine Mystery	Finalist	
2018	Lesbian Mys.	Anne Holt	Odd Numbers	Finalist	
2018	Lesbian Mys.	Jessica L. Webb	Repercussions	Finalist	
2019	Gay Mys.	Marshall Thornton	Late Fees: A Pinx Video Mystery	Winner	
2019	Gay Mys.	Joseph Olshan	Black Diamond Fall	Finalist	
2019	Gay Mys.	Marshall Thornton	Boystown 11: Heart's Desire	Finalist	
2019	Gay Mys.	David S. Pederson	Death Checks In	Finalist	
2019	Gay Mys.	John Copenhaver	Dodging and Burning: A Mystery	Finalist	
2019	Gay Mys.	Bud Gundy	Somewhere Over Lorain Road	Finalist	
2019	Gay Mys.	Neil S. Plakcy	Survival Is a Dying Art: An Angus Green Novel	Finalist	
2019	Gay Mys.	Jeffrey Round	The God Game: A Dan Sharp Mystery	Finalist	
2019	Lesbian Mys.	Claire O'Dell	A Study in Honor: A Novel	Winner	
2019	Lesbian Mys.	Joseph Fink	Alice Isn't Dead: A Novel	Finalist	
2019	Lesbian Mys.	Gerri Hill	The Locket	Finalist	
2019	Lesbian Mys.	Catherine Maiorisi	A Matter of Blood	Finalist	
2019	Lesbian Mys.	Ellen Hart	A Whisper of Bones	Finalist	
2019	Lesbian Mys.	A. Rose Mathieu	Secrets of the Last Castle	Finalist	
2019	Lesbian Mys.	Linda J. Wright	Stolen: A Kieran Yeats Mystery	Finalist	
2020	Gay Mys.	Michael Nava	Carved in Bone: A Henry Rios Novel	Winner	
2020	Gay Mys.	Michael Craft	ChoirMaster: A Mister Puss Mystery	Finalist	
2020	Gay Mys.	David S. Pederson	Death Takes a Bow	Finalist	
2020	Gay Mys.	Marshall Thornton	Rewind	Finalist	
2020	Gay Mys.	Greg Herren	Royal Street Reveillon	Finalist	
2020	Gay Mys.	Timothy Jay Smith	The Fourth Courier	Finalist	
2020	Gay Mys.	Chris Gill	The Nowhere	Finalist	
2020	Gay Mys.	Liam McIlvanney	The Quaker	Finalist	
2020	Lesbian Mys.	Ann McMan	Galileo	Winner	
2020	Lesbian Mys.	Catherine Maiorisi	The Blood Runs Cold	Finalist	
2020	Lesbian Mys.	Claire O'Dell	The Hound of Justice	Finalist	
2020	Lesbian Mys.	Amelia Ellis	The Mirror of Muraro	Finalist	
2020	Lesbian Mys.	Charlotte Greene	Gnarled Hollow	Finalist	
2020	Lesbian Mys.	Ellen Hart	Twisted at the Root: A Jane Lawless Mystery	Finalist	
2021	LGBTQ	Tom Ryan	I Hope You're Listening	Winner	
2021	LGBTQ	A. E. Radley	Death Before Dessert	Finalist	
2021	LGBTQ	Cheryl A. Head	Find Me When I'm Lost	Finalist	
2021	LGBTQ	Stephen Spotswood	Fortune Favors the Dead	Finalist	
2021	LGBTQ	Rosalie Knecht	Vera Kelly Is Not a Mystery	Finalist	
2022	LGBTQ	John Copenhaver	The Savage Kind	Winner	
2022	LGBTQ	P. J. Vernon	Bath Haus	Finalist	
2022	LGBTQ	Jennifer Hanlon Wilde	Finding the Vein	Finalist	
2022	LGBTQ	Michael Nava	Lies With Man	Finalist	
2022	LGBTQ	Stephen Spotswood	Murder Under Her Skin	Finalist	
2023	LGBTQ+	Hayley Scrivenor	Dirt Creek: A Novel	Winner	
2023	LGBTQ+	David C Dawson	A Death in Berlin	Finalist	
2023	LGBTQ+	Joshua Moehling	And There He Kept Her	Finalist	
2023	LGBTQ+	Ann McMan	Dead Letters from Paradise	Finalist	
2023	LGBTQ+	Lev A. C. Rosen	Lavender House	Finalist	
2024	LGBTQ+	Cari Hunter	A Calculated Risk	Winner	
2024	LGBTQ+	Rebecca McKanna	Don't Forget the Girl	Finalist	
2024	LGBTQ+	Polly Stewart	The Good Ones	Finalist	
2024	LGBTQ+	J. M. Redmann	Transitory	Finalist	
2024	LGBTQ+	Joshua Moehling	Where the Dead Sleep	Finalist	
2025	LGBTQ+	Katrina Carrasco	Rough Trade	Winner	
2025	LGBTQ+	Katie Siegel	Charlotte Illes is Not a Teacher	Finalist	
2025	LGBTQ+	Alyssa Cole	One of Us Knows	Finalist	
2025	LGBTQ+	Lev A. C. Rosen	Rough Pages	Finalist	
2025	LGBTQ+	Akira Otani; translated by Sam Bett	The Night of Baba Yaga	Finalist	
2026	LGBTQ+	Robert Holtom	A Queer Case	Winner	
2026	LGBTQ+	Samantha Crewson	Every Sweet Thing Is Bitter	Finalist	
2026	LGBTQ+	Hayley Scrivenor	Girl Falling	Finalist	
2026	LGBTQ+	Lev A. C. Rosen	Mirage City	Finalist	
2026	LGBTQ+	Rob Osler	The Case of the Missing Maid	Finalist	
