= Dorien Gray =

Dorien Gray may refer to:

- The Picture of Dorian Gray, an 1891 philosophical novel by writer and playwright Oscar Wilde
- Roger Margason (died 2015), American author who uses the pseudonym of Dorien Grey
