= Michael Nava =

American attorney and writer (born 1954)

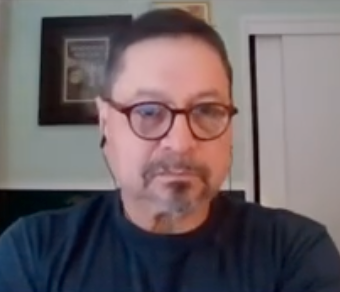
- In an online discussion in 2021
- Born: Michael Angel Nava; September 16, 1954 (age 71); Stockton, California, U.S.
- Education: Stanford Law School (JD); Colorado College (BA)
- Occupations: Lawyer, writer
- Spouse: George Herzog
- Website: www.michaelnavawriter.com

Michael Angel Nava (born September 16, 1954) is an American attorney and writer. He has worked on the staff for the California Supreme Court, and ran for a Superior Court position in 2010. He authored a ten-volume mystery series featuring Henry Rios, an openly gay protagonist who is a criminal defense lawyer. His novels have received seven Lambda Literary Awards and critical acclaim in the GLBT and Latino communities.

== Early life and family ==
Nava grew up in Gardenland, a predominantly working-class Mexican neighborhood in Sacramento, California that he described as "not as an American suburb at all, but rather as a Mexican village, transported perhaps from Guanajuato, where my grandmother's family originated, and set down lock, stock and chicken coop in the middle of California." His maternal family settled there in 1920 after escaping from the Mexican Revolution. Nava's grandmother was an "influential force" whose "piety and humility was highlighted by her Catholic beliefs."

At 12 years old, he started writing and it was also around that time he recognized that he was gay. He was the first person in his family to go to college; he attended Colorado College and "acquired a special affinity for literature and writing." He joined a group of young poets that included writer and humorist David Owen and the poet David Mason. He graduated in 1976 cum laude with a Bachelor of Arts in History.

Nava received a Thomas J. Watson Fellowship, and spent the following year in Buenos Aires and Madrid where he worked on translations of works by Nicaraguan poet Rubén Darío. After returning, he considered graduate education in English or History. He enrolled in Stanford Law School, and received his J.D. in 1981.

== Legal career ==
Nava worked in the Los Angeles City Attorney's office, where he was a deputy attorney and prosecutor on about 50 jury trials. In 1985, he became an associate at the appellate boutique firm Horvitz & Levy, located in Encino, California. He then served as a judicial staff attorney for Arleigh Woods, the first female African-American appellate court justice in California, from 1986-1995. One of the cases he worked on was Jasperson v. Jessica's Nail Clinic in 1989, which resulted in the first published decision to uphold an HIV/AIDS anti-discrimination statute.

After Woods retired, Nava moved back to Northern California and settled in San Francisco. In 1999, he joined the staff of the California Supreme Court. In 2004, he became a judicial attorney for Carlos R. Moreno, who was the third Latino to ever sit on the California Supreme Court. Nava said "Judicial attorneys and law clerks can have a huge influence in shaping the direction of the law, but there are very few attorneys of color in those positions because they are mostly filled through the Old Boys Network. We need to establish our own network."

In 2002, Nava was given a Doctor of Humane Letters honorary degree from the Colorado College in recognition of his literary achievements.

From 2007 to 2009, he was a member of the State Bar of California's Council on Access and Fairness, which advises the State Bar's board of governors on diversity issues. In 2008, he wrote The Servant of All: Humility, Humanity, and Judicial Diversity, a law review article where he put forth the case for judicial diversity.

In 2010, Nava ran for Seat 15 of the San Francisco Superior Court. In the June election, he received a plurality of the votes, but the position required a majority. In the November run-off election with incumbent Richard Ulmer, he received 87,511 votes (46.83%) compared to Ulmer's 99,342 (53.17%).

== Writing career ==
After graduating from Stanford Law School, Nava began writing his first novel. The Little Death features Henry Rios, an openly gay Latino criminal defense lawyer who worked in Los Angeles. He was inspired to create Rios because of a comment by author Toni Morrison about writing books that she wished she could have read when she was growing up. After the novel was rejected by thirteen publishers, it was picked up by Alyson Books, and published in 1986. His follow-up novel, Goldenboy, published in 1988, received critical acclaim by the New York Times which called him a "brilliant storyteller." From 1990-2000, Nava wrote five more Henry Rios books: How Town, The Hidden Law, The Death of Friends, The Burning Plain, and Rag and Bone. He received six Lambda Literary Awards. In 2001, he was awarded the Bill Whitehead Award for Lifetime Achievement from Publishing Triangle, a GLBT professional group within the publishing industry.

In 1994, he co-authored the book Created Equal: Why Gay Rights Matter to America.

After not having written any new novels since 2000, Nava announced in 2008 that he had drafted a new work, The Children of Eve, which was set in the Mexican Revolution. He based one of the main characters on his grandfather. The Children of Eve would later be redone as a quartet of historical fiction novels; the first book would be titled The City of Palaces. In 2016, he published a revised version of the first Henry Rios novel, The Little Death, which he retitled "Lay Your Sleeping Head." In 2018, he adapted the revised novel into season one of an audiodrama podcast called "The Henry Rios Mysteries Podcast." In 2019, he started his own small press, Persigo Press, with the goal of publishing a new edition of the existing Rios novels and to add new novels to the series. The first new novel, Carved in Bone, was published in October 2019. Nava also announced he hoped to publish other LGBTQ writers and writers of color through Persigo Press.

== Personal life ==
In October 2008, Nava married his partner George Herzog, an oncology nurse at the Veteran's Administration hospital in San Francisco. California Supreme Court justice Carlos R. Moreno presided over the ceremony. They live in Daly City, California.

== Awards ==
Year	Title	Award	Result	Ref.
1989	Goldenboy	Lambda Literary Award for Gay Mystery/Science Fiction	Winner	
1989	Goldenboy	Lambda Literary Award for Gay Small Press Book Award	Winner	
1990	Finale: Stories of Mystery	Lambda Literary Award for Anthology	Finalist	
1990	Finale Edited	Lambda Literary Award for Gay Mystery	Finalist	
1991	Howtown	Lambda Literary Award for Gay Mystery	Winner	
1993	The Hidden Law	Lambda Literary Award for Gay Mystery	Winner	
1997	Death of Friends	Lambda Literary Award for Gay Mystery	Winner	
1998	The Burning Plain	Lambda Literary Award for Gay Mystery	Finalist	
2002	Rag and Bone	Lambda Literary Award for Gay Mystery	Winner	
2015	The City of Palaces	Lambda Literary Award for Gay Fiction	Finalist	
2017	Lay Your Sleeping Head	Lambda Literary Award for Gay Mystery	Finalist	
2018	Street People	Lambda Literary Award for Gay Mystery	Finalist	
2020	Carved in Bone	Lambda Literary Award for Gay Mystery	Winner	
2022	Lies With Man	Lambda Literary Award for Gay Mystery	Finalist	

== Publications ==
- Hometowns: Gay Men Write About Where They Belong (1991) - "Gardenland"
- Created Equal: Why Gay Rights Matter to America, with Robert Dawidoff (1994)
- A Member of the Family: Gay Men Write About Their Families (1994) - "Abuelo"
- Finale: Short Stories of Mystery and Suspense (1997) - editor
- Street People (2017)

=== Henry Rios series ===
- The Little Death (1986)
- Goldenboy (1988)
- Howtown (1990)
- The Hidden Law (1992)
- The Death of Friends (1996)
- The Burning Plain (1997)
- Rag and Bone (2001)
- Lay Your Sleeping Head (2016) (This is a reworked version of The Little Death)
- Carved in Bone (2019) (This is a reworked version of Goldenboy)
- Lies With Man (2021)

=== The Children of Eve series ===
- The City of Palaces (2014)

=== Anthologies edited ===
- Finale: Stories of Mystery (1989)

=== Anthology contributions ===
- Certain Voices, edited by Darryl Pilcher (1991)
- Equality: What Do You Think About When You Think of Equality?, edited by Paul Alan Fahey (2017)
