= Greg Herren =

American writer and editor

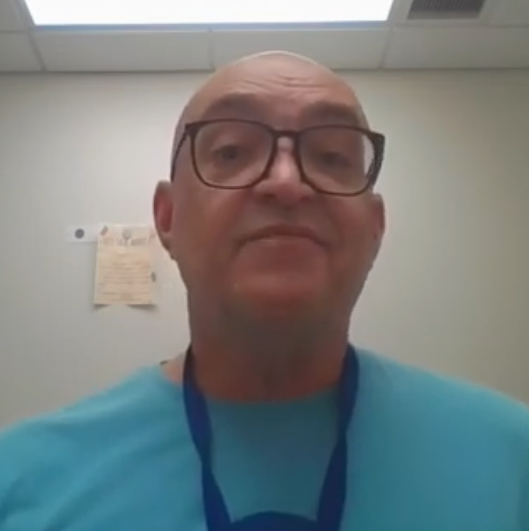
- In a San Francisco Public Library video in 2021
- Born: August 20, 1961 (age 65); Alabama
- Occupations: Writer and editor

Greg Herren (born August 20, 1961) is an American writer and editor, who publishes work in a variety of genres, including mystery novels, young adult literature and erotica. He publishes work both as Greg Herren and under the pseudonym Todd Gregory.

His novel Murder in the Rue Chartres won a Lambda Literary Award in the Gay Mystery category at the 2008 Lambda Literary Awards, and his anthology Love, Bourbon Street: Reflections of New Orleans, co-edited with Paul J. Willis, won in the anthologies category at the 2007 Lambda Literary Awards.

He was also nominated in the mystery category in 2003 for Murder in the Rue Dauphine, in 2004 for Bourbon Street Blues in 2005 for Jackson Square Jazz, in 2007 for Mardi Gras Mambo, in 2010 for Murder in the Garden District and in 2011 for Vieux Carré Voodoo, in the anthologies category in 2005 for Shadows of the Night: Queer Tales of the Uncanny and Unusual and in the science fiction, fantasy and horror category in 2013 for the anthology Night Shadows: Queer Horror, co-edited with J.M. Redmann. As Todd Gregory, he was also nominated in the Gay Erotica category in 2010 for the anthology Rough Trade: Dangerous Gay Erotica and in 2013 for the anthology Raising Hell: Demonic Gay Erotica.

Openly gay, Herren lives in New Orleans, Louisiana, where he also works as an HIV/AIDS counselor and educator. He was also a co-founder of the Saints and Sinners Literary Festival.

In 2005, he was barred from a planned speaking engagement to the gay-straight alliance at Manchester High School in Midlothian, Virginia due to his erotic writing, and was defended by the American Civil Liberties Union.

== Awards ==
Year	Title	Award	Result	Ref.
2003	Murder in the Rue Dauphine	Lambda Literary Award for Gay Mystery	Finalist	
2004	Bourbon Street Blues	Lambda Literary Award for Gay Mystery	Finalist	
2005	Jackson Square Jazz	Lambda Literary Award for Gay Mystery	Finalist	
2005	Shadows of the Night	Gaylactic Spectrum Award for Best Other Work	Finalist	
2005	Shadows of the Night	Lambda Literary Award for Science Fiction, Fantasy and Horror	Finalist	
2007	Love, Bourbon Street	Lambda Literary Award for Anthology	Winner	
2007	Mardi Gras Mambo	Lambda Literary Award for Gay Mystery	Finalist	
2008	Murder in the Rue Chartres	Lambda Literary Award for Gay Mystery	Winner	
2010	Murder in the Garden District	Lambda Literary Award for Gay Mystery	Finalist	
2011	Vieux Carre Voodoo	Lambda Literary Award for Gay Mystery	Finalist	
2012	Night Shadows	Shirley Jackson Award for Edited Anthology	Finalist	
2013	Night Shadows	Lambda Literary Award for Science Fiction, Fantasy and Horror	Finalist	
2014	Baton Rouge Bingo	Lambda Literary Award for Gay Mystery	Finalist	
2020	Royal Street Reveillon	Lambda Literary Award for Gay Mystery	Finalist	

== Novels ==
=== Scotty Bradley Mysteries ===
- Bourbon Street Blues (2004, ISBN 978-0758202130)
- Jackson Square Jazz (2005, ISBN 978-0758202154)
- Mardi Gras Mambo (2006, ISBN 978-0758208309)
- Vieux Carré Voodoo (2010, ISBN 978-1602821521)
- Who Dat Whodunnit (2011, ISBN 978-1-60282-225-2)
- Baton Rouge Bingo (2013, ISBN 978-1602829541)
- Garden District Gothic (2016, ISBN 978-1626396678)
- Royal Street Reveillon (2019, ISBN 978-1635555462)
- Mississippi River Mischief (2023, ISBN 978-1636793542)

=== Chanse MacLeod Mysteries ===
- Murder in the Rue Dauphine (2002, ISBN 978-1555835859)
- Murder in the Rue St. Ann (2004, ISBN 978-1555838171)
- Murder in the Rue Chartres (2007, ISBN 978-1555839666)
- Murder in the Rue Ursulines (2008, ISBN 978-1593500955)
- Murder in the Garden District (2009, ISBN 978-1593501051)
- Murder in the Irish Channel (2011, ISBN 978-1602825840)
- Murder in the Arts District (2014, ISBN 978-1626392069)

=== Other novels ===
- Sorceress (2010, ISBN 978-0984531813)
- Sleeping Angel (2011, ISBN 978-1602822146)
- Sara (2012, ISBN 978-1602826748)
- Timothy (2012, ISBN 978-1602827608)
- Fashion Victim (2012, e-book)
- Lake Thirteen (2013, ISBN 978-1602828940)

=== Anthologies ===
- Shadows of the Night: Queer Tales of the Uncanny and Unusual (2004, ISBN 978-1560233947)
- Midnight Thirsts: Erotic Tales of the Vampire (2004, ISBN 978-0758206633)
- Love, Bourbon Street: A Celebration of New Orleans (2006, ISBN 978-1555839819)
- Men of the Mean Streets: Gay Noir (2011, ISBN 978-1-60282-240-5)
- Women of the Mean Streets: Lesbian Noir (2011, ISBN 978-1602822412)
- Night Shadows: Queer Horror (2012, ISBN 978-1602827516)

=== Erotica (as Todd Gregory) ===
- Every Frat Boy Wants It (2007, ISBN 978-0758217196)
- Rough Trade: Dangerous Gay Erotica (2009, ISBN 978-1602820920)
- Midnight Hunger: Erotic Tales of the Vampire (2009, ISBN 978-0758235367)
- Blood Sacraments (2010, ISBN 978-1602821903)
- Games Frat Boys Play (2011, ISBN 978-0758247421)
- Wings: Subversive Gay Angel Erotica (2011, ISBN 978-1602825659)
- Need (2012, ISBN 978-0758267153)
- Sweat: Gay Jock Erotica (2012, ISBN 978-1602826694)
- Raising Hell: Demonic Gay Erotica (2012, ISBN 978-1602827684)
- Promises in Every Star (2013, ISBN 978-1602827875)
