= Anthony Bidulka =

Canadian writer (born 1962)

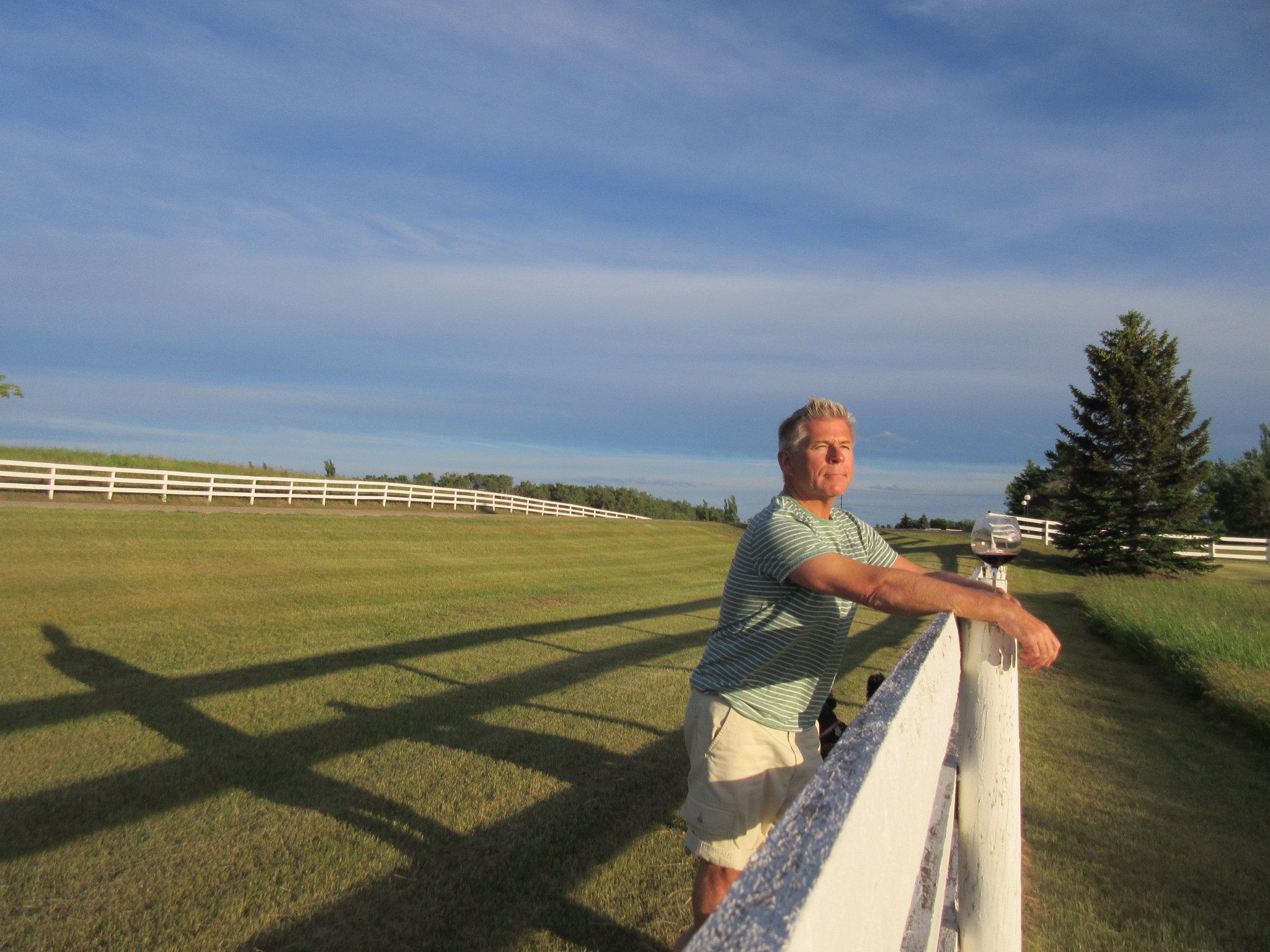
- Born: July 24, 1962 (age 64); Prud'homme, Saskatchewan, Canada
- Occupation: Mystery writer
- Notable work: Flight of Aquavit; Sundowner Ubuntu
- Awards: Lambda Literary Award (2005); CWC Award (2023)
- Website: www.anthonybidulka.com

Anthony Bidulka (born July 24, 1962) is a Canadian writer of mystery, thriller and suspense novels. Bidulka's books have been nominated for Crime Writers of Canada Arthur Ellis Awards, Saskatchewan Book Awards, a ReLit Award, and Lambda Literary Awards. In 2005, he became the first Canadian to win the Lambda Literary Award for Mystery, Gay.

== Biography ==
Bidulka was born July 24, 1962, the youngest of three children raised on a farm near Prud'homme, Saskatchewan. He is a Ukrainian descendant.

Though he originally intended to study optometry, Bidulka ultimately received three undergraduate degrees from the University of Saskatchewan: a Bachelor of Arts in Psychology (1983), a Bachelor of Education, and a Bachelor of Commerce. After graduation, he worked as a teacher and CPA before devoting himself to full-time writing in 1999.

Bidulka has been with his partner since 1991, and they live together in Saskatoon.

== Awards and honours ==
Bidulka has been honoured by the University of Saskatchewan, first in 2011 when he was inducted into the College of Education's Wall of Honour, then again in 2020, when he won the Alumni of Influence Award from the College of Arts and Science at the University of Saskatchewan.

In 2014, Bidulka was named the Saskatoon Citizen of the Year. In 2017, he received the Nation Builders Award from the Ukrainian Canadian Community of Saskatchewan. In 2023, his book, Going to Beautiful was named Best Crime Novel of the year by the Crime Writers of Canada.

- 1983 – Bachelor of Arts (BA) degree (with distinction); University of Saskatchewan
- 1991 – Bachelor of Education (BEd); University of Saskatchewan
- 1991 – Bachelor of Commerce (BComm) (with distinction); University of Saskatchewan
- 1993 – Qualified for Chartered Accountant (CA) designation
- 1994 – 1997 – Board of Directors – AIDS Saskatoon
- 1997 – Master of Ceremonies, Institute of Chartered Accountants of Saskatchewan Convocation
- 1998 – Board of Directors – Saskatchewan International Ice Festival
- 1998 – 2001 – Board of Directors – Persephone Theatre
- 2000 – 2001 – President, Persephone Theatre Board of Directors
- 2003 – Shortlisted for Arthur Ellis Award (Amuse Bouche)
- 2003 – Shortlisted for ReLit Award (Amuse Bouche)
- 2004 – Shortlisted for Saskatchewan Book Award (Flight of Aquavit)
- 2004 – Winner – Lambda Literary Award (Flight of Aquavit)
- 2005 – Board of Directors – Saskatchewan Writers’ Guild
- 2005 – 2008 – Board of Directors – Saskatchewan Writers’ Guild Foundation
- 2005 – Shortlisted for Saskatchewan Book Award (Tapas on the Ramblas)
- 2006 – Presenter at Lambda Literary Awards – Washington, DC
- 2006 – Cover of Planet S Magazine
- 2007 – Shortlisted for Lambda Literary Award (Stain of the Berry)
- 2007 – Shortlisted for Saskatchewan Book Award (Stain of the Berry)
- 2007 – Presenter at Lambda Literary Awards – New York City, NY
- 2008 – 2018 – Co-Chair, Camp fYrefly Saskatchewan Board of Directors
- 2008 – Shortlisted for Lambda Literary Award (Sundowner Ubuntu)
- 2008 – Master of Ceremonies – Bloody Words Mystery Conference Gala Dinner – Toronto, ON
- 2008 – Cover of Acreage Life Magazine
- 2009 – 2010 – Board of Directors – Crime Writers of Canada
- 2009 – Avenue Community Centre Community Service Award
- 2009 – Shortlisted for Saskatchewan Book Award (Aloha, Candy Hearts)
- 2010 – Shortlisted for Arthur Ellis Award (Aloha, Candy Hearts)
- 2010 – Rainbow Award for Best Mystery/Thriller (Date With a Sheesha)
- 2010 – McNally Robinson Saskatchewan #1 Fiction Bestseller (Date With a Sheesha)
- 2010 – 2012 – Board of Directors, International Association of Crime Writers
- 2011 – Named American Library Association GLBT Round Table Over The Rainbow – Top Mystery (Aloha, Candy Hearts)
- 2011 – Named American Library Association GLBT Round Table Over The Rainbow – Top Mystery (Date With a Sheesha)
- 2011 – Master of Ceremonies – Crime Writers of Canada Arthur Ellis Awards – Victoria, BC
- 2011 – Inducted onto Wall of Honour, College of Education, University of Saskatchewan
- 2011 – Named Judge for the 2011 Lambda Literary Awards
- 2012 – Cover of Saskatoon Express
- 2012 – When Words Collide Literary Festival Guest of Honour
- 2012 – Honorary Committee Member – University of Alberta Institute for Sexual Minorities Studies and Services Fundraising Campaign
- 2012 – Master of Ceremonies – Canadian Reception – Bouchercon Mystery Conference – Cleveland, OH
- 2012 – McNally Robinson Saskatchewan #1 Fiction Bestseller (Dos Equis)
- 2013 – McNally Robinson Saskatchewan #1 Fiction Bestseller (When The Saints Go Marching In)
- 2013 – Keynote Speaker, When Words Collide Festival, Calgary, AB
- 2014 – Named Judge for the 2014 Lambda Literary Awards
- 2014 – 2017 – Board of Directors, The Word On The Street Saskatoon
- 2014 – Guest Lecturer, Alexandra Writers’ Centre Society, Calgary
- 2014 – Named Saskatoon Citizen of the Year, CTV Saskatoon (alongside husband Herb McFaull)
- 2015 – Keynote Speaker, Regina Public Library Readers Summit
- 2015 – Cover of Bridges Magazine
- 2015 – 2021 – Advisory Board, artSpace Saskatoon Inc.
- 2016 – Favorite Crime Fiction of 2016 List – The Rap Sheet (Set Free)
- 2017 – The Peter Corren Award for Outstanding Achievement
- 2017 – The Nation Builders Award – The Ukrainian Canadian Congress
- 2018 – 2019 – Committee Chair, galaMODERN for Remai Modern Art Gallery of Saskatchewan
- 2020 – Recipient of the University of Saskatchewan College of Arts and Science Alumni of Influence Award
- 2020 – Aspen Ridge (Saskatoon, SK) parks assigned the names Bidulka Park and Bidulka Park North
- 2020 – University of Saskatchewan Alumni Advisory Board
- 2021 – Chair – USAAB Achievement Awards Committee
- 2022 – McNally Robinson Saskatchewan #1 Fiction Bestseller (Going to Beautiful)
- 2022 – Booknet Canada #7 Canadian Fiction Bestseller (Going to Beautiful)
- 2022 – Going to Beautiful appears on Hamilton Review of Books top ten bestseller list recognizing independently published books purchased from independent bookstores – May–September
- 2022 – Going to Beautiful selected by The Book Publishers Association of Alberta for audiobook production project with the CNIB
- 2022 – Going to Beautiful included on The Rap Sheet’s list of Favorite Crime Fiction of 2022
- 2023 – Shortlisted for Saskatchewan Book Award – Fiction Award (Going to Beautiful)
- 2023 – Winner – Crime Writers of Canada Award of Excellence – 2023 Best Crime Novel (Going to Beautiful)
- 2023 – Winner – Independent Publisher Book Award – 2023 Canada West Best Fiction Gold Medalist (Going to Beautiful)
- 2023 – Finalist for the American Fiction Award – LGBTQ+ Fiction Category (Livingsky)
- 2023 – Finalist for the American Fiction Award – Mystery/Suspense: Multicultural & Diverse Category (Livingsky)
- 2023 – Shortlisted for Alberta Book Publishers Award – Mystery and Thriller Book of the Year (Going to Beautiful)

== Publications ==
- Set Free (2016)
- Going to Beautiful (2022)
- Livingsky (2023)
- From Sweetgrass Bridge (2024)

=== Russell Quant series ===
1. Amuse-Bouche (2003)
2. Flight of Aquavit (2004)
3. Tapas on the Ramblas (2005)
4. Stain of the Berry (2006)
5. Sundowner Ubuntu (2007)
6. Aloha, Candy Hearts (2009)
7. Date with a Seesha (2010)
8. Dos Equis (2012)

=== The Adam Saint Suspense series ===
- When the Saints Go Marching In (2013)
- The Women of Skawa Island (2014)
