= Kim Baldwin =

American writer

Kim Baldwin is an American writer. Combined, her novels have won an IPPY Award, Lambda Literary Award, and multiple Golden Crown Literary Awards. She also received The Alice B. Medal, which honors lifetime achievement for lesbian writers.

== Personal life ==
Baldwin lives in a cabin in a national forest in northern Michigan with two cats.

She enjoys photography and traveling. She first traveled to Europe when she was 14, then returned at 18 with Suitcase Theater. Since then, she has traveled globally.

== Career ==
For 20 years, Baldwin worked as a writer for CNN and eventually became editorial director.

== Awards and honors ==
Year	Work	Award/Honor	Result	Ref.
2008		Alice B. Medal	Recipient	
2010	Thief of Always	Golden Crown Literary Award for Romantic Suspense/Intrigue/Thriller	Winner	
2011	Missing Lynx	Golden Crown Literary Award for Romantic Suspense/Intrigue	Winner	
2011	Missing Lynx	Lambda Literary Award for Lesbian Mystery	Finalist	
2012	Dying to Live	Lambda Literary Award for Lesbian Mystery	Winner	
2016	One Last Thing	Golden Crown Literary Award for Romantic Suspense/Intrigue/Thriller	Winner	
2014	The Gemini Deception	Golden Crown Literary Award for Romantic Suspense/Intrigue/Thriller	Winner	
2012	Dying To Live	Golden Crown Literary Award for Romantic Suspense/Intrigue/Thriller	Winner	
2011	Breaking the Ice	IPPY for Romance	Winner (silver)	

== Publications ==
=== Alaska series ===
- Whitewater Rendezvous (2006)
- Breaking the Ice (2009)
- High Impact (2011)

=== Elite Operatives series ===
- Lethal Affairs (2008)
- Thief of Always (2009)
- Missing Lynx (2010)
- Dying to Live (2011)
- Demons are Forever, with Xenia Alexiou (2012)
- The Gemini Deception, with Xenia Alexiou (2013)
- One Last Thing (2015)

=== Short stories ===
- "Overdue," in Erotic Interludes 2: Stolen Moments (2005)
- "The French Lesson,” in Erotic Interludes 2: Lessons Learned (2006)
- “Making Her Mine,” in Erotic Interludes 4: Extreme Passions
- “Off the Menu,” in Erotic Interludes 5: Road Games (2007)
- “Paradise Found," in Romantic Interludes 1: Discovery (2008)
- “Meeting my Match," in Romantic Interludes 2: Secrets (2009)
- Sleigh Ride: A short holiday fairy tale (2016)
- The French Lesson (2019)

=== Standalone novels ===
- Force of Nature (2005)
- Hunter's Pursuit (2005)
- Flight Risk (2007)
- Focus of Desire (2007)
- Taken by Storm (2014)
