= Antoinette Azolakov =

American author

Antoinette Azolakov (born 1944, in Lufkin, Texas) is an American author.

In 1989, Skiptrace won the Lambda Literary Award for Lesbian Mystery. The following year, her novel The Contactees Die Young was a finalist for the same award.

== Publications ==
- Cass and the Stone Butch (1987)
- Skiptrace (1988)
- The Contactees Die Young (1989)
- Blood Lavender (1993)
- Ghostly Voices: Thirteen Texas Ghosts (2010)
