= Jessica L. Webb =

Canadian writer

Jessica L. Webb is a Canadian writer of mystery thriller novels. Her second published novel, Pathogen, won the Lambda Literary Award for Lesbian Mystery at the 29th Lambda Literary Awards in 2017, and her fourth novel, Repercussions, is a shortlisted nominee in the same category at the 30th Lambda Literary Awards in 2018.

Her novels, centring on medical investigator Dr. Kate Morrison, are published by Bold Strokes Books.

== Works ==
- Trigger (2016)
- Pathogen (2016)
- Troop 18 (2017)
- Repercussions (2017)
- Shadowboxer (2018)
- Storm Lines (2020)
