= Diane L. Browne =

American author and singer

- Born: Los Angeles, California, U.S.
- Other names: D.L. Browne; Colin Dunne; Louise Harris; Diana Killian; Josh Lanyon
- Education: Pepperdine University
- Occupations: Author; singer
- Years active: 2002–present
- Spouse: Kevin Burton Smith

Diane L. Browne is an American author and singer. As an author she writes under the pen names Colin Dunne, Louise Harris, Diana Killian, and Josh Lanyon. As a singer she performs with the Celtic music group The Browne Sisters & George Cavanaugh.

== Personal life ==
Browne was born in Los Angeles, California. She graduated from Pepperdine University with degrees in English and Humanities.

Browne is married to author Kevin Burton Smith.

== Colin Dunne ==
Browne writes mysteries and Cold War thrillers under the pen name Colin Dunne.

== Diana Killian ==
Browne writes cozy mysteries under the pen name Diana Killian.

=== Poetic Death mystery series ===
- Killian, Diana (2003). High Rhymes and Misdemeanors. Pocket Books. ISBN 9780743466783.
- Killian, Diana (2004). Verse of the Vampire. Pocket Books. ISBN 9780743466790.
- Killian, Diana (2006). Sonnet of the Sphinx. Pocket Books. ISBN 9780743466806.
- Killian, Diana (2009). Docketful of Poesy. Perseverance Press. ISBN 9781880284971.

=== Mantra for Murder series ===
- Killian, Diana (2008). Corpse Pose. Berkley Prime Crime. ISBN 9780425220900.
- Killian, Diana (2009). Dial Om for Murder. Berkley Prime Crime. ISBN 9780425227053.
- Killian, Diana (2010). Murder on the Eightfold Path. Berkley Prime Crime. ISBN 9780425233917.
- Killian, Diana (2011). Murder on the Eightfold Path. Berkley Prime Crime. ISBN 9780425243817.

== Josh Lanyon ==
Browne writes gay mystery and M/M romance novels under the pen name Josh Lanyon. As Lanyon she has won an EPIC (Electronic Publishing Industry Coalition) Ebook Award and she has been a finalist four times for the Lambda Literary Awards (in 2007 and 2015 for Gay Mystery, in 2009 for Gay Romance, and in 2010 for Nonfiction (Note: The essay "The Play of Shadows and Light: Hansen Before Dave" by Josh Lanyon appeared in the book The Golden Age of Gay Fiction, edited by Drewey Wayne Gunn, which was a finalist for the Lambda Literary Award for Nonfiction in 2010.)).

=== Adrien English mystery series ===
- Lanyon, Josh (2000). Fatal Shadows. MLR Press. ISBN 9780979311048.
- Lanyon, Josh (2002). A Dangerous Thing. MLR Press. ISBN 9780979311055.
- Lanyon, Josh (2006). The Hell You Say. iUniverse. ISBN 9780595385126.
- Lanyon, Josh (2008). Death of a Pirate King. MLR Press. ISBN 9781934531310.
- Lanyon, Josh (2009). The Dark Tide. Loose Id. ISBN 9781607374909.
- Lanyon, Josh (2013). Stranger Things Have Happened. JustJoshin Publishing, Inc. ISBN 9781937909307.
- Lanyon, Josh (2016). So This is Christmas. Smashwords. ISBN 9781937909796.
- Lanyon, Josh (2023). A Funny Thing Happened. JustJoshin Publishing, Inc. ISBN 9781649310439.

=== Holmes & Moriarity mystery series ===
- Lanyon, Josh (2009). Somebody Killed His Editor. JustJoshin Publishing, Inc. ISBN 9781937909598.
- Lanyon, Josh (2010). All She Wrote. Samhain Publishing. ISBN 9781609282004.
- Lanyon, Josh (2014). The Boy with the Painful Tattoo. JustJoshin Publishing, Inc. ISBN 9781937909376.
- Lanyon, Josh (2018). In Other Words… Murder. JustJoshin Publishing, Inc. ISBN 9781945802263.

=== Dangerous Ground series ===
- Lanyon, Josh (2008). Dangerous Ground. Loose Id. ISBN 9781596326583.
- Lanyon, Josh (2009). Old Poison. JustJoshin Publishing, Inc. ISBN 9780984766963.
- Lanyon, Josh (2010). Blood Heat. Loose Id. ISBN 9781607378693.
- Lanyon, Josh (2011). Dead Run. Loose Id. ISBN 9781611184648.
- Lanyon, Josh (2013). Kick Start. JustJoshin Publishing, Inc. ISBN 9781937909406.
- Lanyon, Josh (2020). Blind Side. JustJoshin Publishing, Inc. ASIN B0826X5MXF.

=== All's Fair series ===
- Lanyon, Josh (2010). Fair Game. Carina Press. ISBN 9780373427710.
- Lanyon, Josh (2014). Fair Play. Carina Press. ISBN 9781426898976.
- Lanyon, Josh (2017). Fair Chance. Carina Press. ISBN 9781459293618.

== The Browne Sisters & George Cavanaugh ==
Browne sings with her sisters Pamela Browne Logan and Laura Browne-Sorenson and their cousin George Cavanaugh in a Celtic music group called The Browne Sisters & George Cavanaugh which has been performing for over 20 years
