= Nikki Baker =

American mystery novelist

Jennifer Dowdell, writing under the pseudonym Nikki Baker (born 1962), is an African-American mystery novelist. Her character Virginia Kelly is the first African-American detective to appear in lesbian fiction.

== Biography ==
Dowdell received her bachelor's degree in chemical engineering and took an MBA in economics and finance, and worked briefly as an engineer before turning to the financial services industry. Her mystery novels feature a young, black, lesbian financial analyst who lives and works in Chicago. She has also written two anthologized novellas. Baker's work has been published by such outlets as Naiad Press, Bella Books, and Third Side Press.

Little biographical information about Dowdell is available, and she remains private about her life. Two of her novels, The Lavender House Murder and Long Goodbyes, were finalists for the Lambda Literary Award for Lesbian Mystery.

== Works ==
(List from:)

=== Novels ===
- In the Game, 1991
- The Lavender House Murder, 1992
- Long Goodbyes, 1993
- The Ultimate Exit Strategy: A Virginia Kelly Mystery, 2001

=== Novellas ===
- "Film Noir", 1995
- "Negatives", 1996
