= Lauren Maddison =

Author and former attorney

Lauren Maddison is a former attorney and author of the Connor Hawthorne mystery series. The series consists of five books published by Alyson Books: Deceptions (1999), Witchfire (2001), Death by Prophecy (2002), Epitaph for an Angel (2003), and The Eleventh Hour (2004). Witchfire, Death by Prophecy, and Epitaph for an Angel were finalists for the Lambda Literary Award for Lesbian Mystery in 2002, 2003, and 2004, respectively.

== Connor Hawthorne series ==
Maddison's debut novel and the first in the Connor Hawthorne series, Deception, was published in May 1999. Set in Washington, D.C., the novel follows Connor Hawthorne, who, like Maddison, is a mystery writer and former attorney. After the death of her long-time companion, Ariana, Hawthorne works with police and her father, a former senator, eventually becoming a target for murder. Although Hawthorne initially believed Ariana was killed in a mugging, she soon believes Ariana was intentionally murdered and works to solve the case. While working with Native American bodyguard Laura Nez and officer Malcolm, Hawthorne encounters mystical powers at a Navajo ceremonial center in New Mexico. Publishers Weekly called the novel "clumsily constructed", stating that it "quickly devolves into a poorly plotted, conspiracy-driven battle between agents of the conservative military-industrial complex and heroine". Conversely, Library Journal's Rex E. Klett found the novel to be "rich in ideas, intrigue, [and] incredible psychological suspense", with "vivid description, and delicate layers of deceit".

The second novel in the Connor Hawthorne series, Witchfire, was published in June 2001. In this novel, Hawthorne heads to England to discover who has dug up her grandmother's grave and why. Alongside Nez and Malcolm, Hawthorne learns of her grandmother's supernatural powers and the reason why her grave was dug up. Julia Sarkessian, writing for the Lambda Book Report, noted that "the book includes a bit too much exposition", especially regarding the spiritual elements, but commended Maddison's use of British dialect and culture. Regarding characterization, Sarkessian found the villains to be generally well rounded but argued that the seemingly healthy romantic relationship between Nez and Hawthorne, as well as the relationship between Hawthorne and her later grandmother, could be better described. Witchfire was a finalist for the 2002 Lambda Literary Award for Lesbian Mystery.

Death by Prophecy, the third novel in the Connor Hawthorne series, was published in November 2002. In the novel, Hawthorne and Nez are in California investigating what may be a terrorist attack when a priest they've recently met is presumably murdered. Using spiritual gifts, the pair learn that the priest recently recovered an ancient artifact and may have been considered a heretic by the Catholic Church. Along with Malcolm, Hawthorne's father, and an FBI agent, the group attempt to unravel the mysterious murder and uncover secret societies. Sandra de Helem, writing for Lambda Book Report, argued that "Maddison has a tendency to overwrite in places", noting that the first four chapters can be skimmed by those who have read earlier books in the series. Despite this, de Helem found that plots to be "intricate" and the "characters fully drawn". Death by Prophecy was a finalist for the 2003 Lambda Literary Award for Lesbian Mystery.

Maddison's third book in the series, Death by Prophecy, finds Connor and Laura using their spiritual gifts to help them solve the murder of a priest that they recently met. It seems the priest was considered a potential heretic by the Vatican and may have had information on a long-lost artifact that could change the Catholic Church's history. "Maddison creates edgy, moody settings very well," wrote Whitney Scott in Booklist. Library Journal critic Klett commented that the author "once again serves up entrancing prose, intricate plotting, and masterly characterizations." Lambda Book Report contributor Sandra de Helem noted that the book is not the usual mystery, stating: "It's long and densely written like a rich tapestry; this is a book to take to bed with you on long winter nights."

Epitaph for an Angel, the fourth book in the series, was published in 2003. In the novel, Hawthorne "investigates three deaths, including her mother's murder". In doing so, she traces murders back in time to Colonial America and the Nazi Germany. Epitaph for an Angel was a finalist for the 2004 Lambda Literary Award for Lesbian Mystery.

The final book in the series, The Eleventh Hour, was published in 2004. In the novel, Hawthorne and Nez investigate a friend's murder. After following leads to England, "they encounter a cult led by a woman with supposed healing powers", which could have drastic negative impacts.

== Publications ==
- Deceptions. Alyson Books. 1999. ISBN 978-1-555-83490-6.
- Witchfire. Alyson Books. 2001. ISBN 978-1-555-83595-8.
- Death by Prophecy. Alyson Books. 2002. ISBN 978-1-555-83764-8.
- Epitaph for an Angel. Alyson Books. 2003. ISBN 978-1-555-83812-6.
- The Eleventh Hour. Alyson Books. 2004. ISBN 978-1-555-83878-2.
