= Robert D. Zimmerman =

American novelist

Robert Dingwall (R.D.) Zimmerman (born August 23, 1952) is an American author of mysteries, psychological thrillers, children's books, mystery games, and historical fiction. He has won several literary awards, and is the author of the New York Times Bestseller, "The Kitchen Boy" (written under the pen name of Robert Alexander). He studied at Leningrad State University, traveled extensively in the USSR, and later worked in Russia for numerous years.

== Early life ==
He was raised in the Chicago area, and is the great-grandson of businessman and philanthropist, Charles H. Wacker. His husband was noted architect Lars Hunt Peterssen, June 5, 1956 – November 3, 2020. He currently resides in Minneapolis, MN.

== Books ==
=== Todd Mills series ===
- Closet (Oct 1994)
- Tribe (Aug 1996)
- Hostage (Oct 1997)
- Outburst (Oct 1998)
- Innuendo (Nov 1999)

=== Alex & Maddy Phillips series ===
- Death Trance (Oct 1992)
- Blood Trance (Jun 1993)
- Red Trance (Jul 1994)

=== Tsarist Russian series ===
(written under the pen name Robert Alexander)

- The Kitchen Boy: A Novel of the Last Tsar (2003)
- Rasputin's Daughter (2006)
- The Romanov Bride (2008)

=== Other books ===
- The Cross and the Sickle (Jan 1984)
- The Red Encounter (Sep 1986)
- Blood Russian (Oct 1987)
- Mindscream (Jul 1989)
- Deadfall in Berlin (Sep 1990)
- When Dad Came Back as My Dog (2011)
- Vanished Splendor: The Colorful World of the Romanovs, Christopher Bohnet, illustrator (Mar, 2017)

=== Children's Books ===
(written under the pen name M. Masters)

- The Secret of the Long Lost Cousin (1983)
- The Case of the Video Game Smugglers
- The Case of the Chocolate Snatcher
- The Case of the Famous Chocolate Chip Cookies
- The Secret of the Loon Lake Monster
- The Mystery of the Haunted House

=== Mystery Jigsaw Puzzles ===
- Murder Most Artful (1987)
- Bomb
- Death by Diet
- The Emerald Spy

== Awards ==
Year	Title	Award	Result	Ref.
1991	Deadfall in Berlin	Edgar Award for Best Mystery	Finalist	
1996	Closet	Anthony Award for Best Paperback	Finalist	
1996	Closet	Lambda Literary Award for Gay Mystery	Winner	
1997	Tribe	Edgar Award for Best Paperback	Finalist	
1997	Tribe	Lambda Literary Award for Gay Mystery	Finalist	
1998	Hostage	Lambda Literary Award for Gay Mystery	Finalist	
1999	Outburst	Lambda Literary Award for Gay Mystery	Winner	
