= David Lennon =

American writer

- Born: 1962 (age 63–64)
- Occupation: Author
- Spouse: Brian
- Writing career
- Notable awards: Lambda Literary Award for Mystery (2011)

David Lennon (born 1962) is an American author. His 2011 novel Echoes won the Lambda Literary Award for Gay Mystery, and four other of his novels have been finalists for Lambda Literary Awards.

== Personal life ==
Lennon was mostly raised in the Boston area, and though his family moved around a bit when he was a child, he considers Weston, Massachusetts his home.

Around 2016, Lennon moved to Kennebuck, Maine with his husband, Brian.

== Awards and honors ==
Year	Title	Award/Honor	Result	Ref.
2011	Echoes	Lambda Literary Award for Gay Mystery	Winner	
2012	Blue’s Bayou	Lambda Literary Award for Gay Mystery	Finalist	
2014	Fierce	Lambda Literary Award for Gay Mystery	Finalist	
2015	DeadFall	Lambda Literary Award for Gay Mystery	Finalist	
2017	Irish Black	Lambda Literary Award for Science Fiction, Fantasy and Horror	Finalist	

== Publications ==
- Deadfall (2014)
- Irish Black (2016)

=== Michel Doucette & Sassy Jones Mystery series ===
- The Quarter Boys (2010)
- Echoes (2010)
- Second Chance (2011)
- Blue's Bayou (2011)
- Reckoning (2012)
- Fierce (2013)
- Deja Vieux (2020)
