= Beth Bernobich =

American writer

- Born: 1959 (age 66–67); Lansdowne, Pennsylvania, U.S.
- Occupation: Writer
- Writing career
- Pen name: Claire O'Dell
- Genres: Science fiction; fantasy
- Notable awards: Lambda Literary Award for Lesbian Mystery (2019), RT Reviewers Choice Award for Best Epic Fantasy (2010)
- Website: claireodell.com

Beth Bernobich (born 1959) is an American science fiction and fantasy writer. She also goes by the pen name Claire O'Dell. She was born in Lansdowne, Pennsylvania in 1959. Her first novel, Passion Play was published by Tor Books in October 2010, and won the Romantic Times 2010 Reviewer Choice Award for Best Epic Fantasy. Her Sherlock Holmes-based novel, A Study in Honor was published by Harper Voyager in July 2018 and won the 2019 Lambda Literary Award for Lesbian Mystery.

== Selected works ==
=== River of Souls Series ===
- "River of Souls", Tor.com, September 2010
- Passion Play, October 2010, from Tor Books, winner for Best Epic Fantasy (2010 RT Reviewers' Choice Awards), long-listed for the 2010 Tiptree Award
- Queen's Hunt, Tor Books, July 2012, Locus 2012 Recommended Reading List
- Allegiance, Tor Books, October 2013
- Thief of War (novella), Tor.com, September 2013
- Nocturnall (novelette), December 2015

=== Lóng City and The Seventy Kingdoms ===
- "Pig, Crane, Fox: Three Hearts Unfolding", Magic in the Mirrorstone, from Mirrorstone Books, in 2008, re-released in e-book format, September 2011
- Fox and Phoenix, from Viking in October 2011, and in audiobook from Random House in October 2011; nominated for the YASLA Best Fiction for Young Adults
- The Ghost Dragon's Daughter (novelette), October 2015

=== Éireann Series ===
- "A Flight of Numbers Fantastique Strange" Asimov's Magazine, June 2006
- "The Golden Octopus", Postscripts, Summer 2008; reprinted in The Year's Best Science Fiction & Fantasy 2009, Rich Horton (ed.), January 2010; reprinted in XB-1, Czech translation, June 2011
- Ars Memoriae, PS Publishing, December 2009
- The Time Roads, Tor Books, October 2014; finalist for Best Fantasy Novel (2014 RT Reviewers' Choice Awards)

== As Claire O'Dell ==
=== The Janet Watson Chronicles ===
- A Study in Honor, July 2018, Harper Voyager; Winner, Best Lesbian Mystery (2019 Lambda Literary Awards)
- The Hound of Justice, July 2019, Harper Voyager; Finalist, Best Lesbian Mystery (2020 Lambda Literary Awards)

=== The Mage and Empire Series ===
- A Jewel Bright Sea, September 2019, Rebel Base Books (an imprint of Kensington Publishing)
- The Empire's Edge, TBD

=== River of Souls Series ===
- Passion Play, October 2010, from Tor Books, winner for Best Epic Fantasy (2010 RT Reviewers' Choice Awards), long-listed for the 2010 Tiptree Awards. Second edition released under Claire O'Dell, February 2021
- Queen's Hunt, Tor Books, July 2012, Locus 2012 Recommended Reading List. Second edition released under Claire O'Dell, February 2021
- Allegiance, Tor Books, October 2013. Second edition released under Claire O'Dell, February 2021
- Nocturnall (novelette), December 2015. Re-released under Claire O'Dell

=== Other books ===
- The Time Roads, Tor Books, October 2014; finalist for Best Fantasy Novel (2014 RT Reviewers' Choice Awards). Re-released under Claire O'Dell
- A Handful of Pearls & Other Stories, Lethe Press (June 2010), second edition published by the author (May 2011); finalist for Best Indie Fantasy/Paranormal (2011 RT Reviewers' Choice Awards) Re-released under Claire O'Dell
