= George Baxt =

American screenwriter and author (1923–2003)

- Born: June 11, 1923; New York City, US
- Died: June 28, 2003 (aged 80); New York City, US
- Occupations: Screenwriter, novelist

George Baxt (June 11, 1923 – June 28, 2003) was an American screenwriter and author of crime fiction, best remembered for creating the gay black detective, Pharaoh Love. Four of his novels were finalists for the Lambda Literary Award for Gay Mystery.

== Life and work ==
George Leonard Baxt was born in Brooklyn, New York, to Russian/Jewish immigrants. After working for several years as an agent he moved to Britain in the late 1950s and began a new career as a writer for television and the cinema. His most notable screenplays include The City of the Dead (1960) starring Christopher Lee and three collaborations with director Sidney Hayers noted for their taut suspense and black humour: Circus of Horrors (1960), the thriller Payroll (1961) from the novel by Derek Bickerton and Night of the Eagle (1962) which he re-wrote following a draft by Charles Beaumont and Richard Matheson, though his credit was omitted from the US version which was released as Burn, Witch, Burn. The Hayers films were all made at Anglo-Amalgamated.

In 1966 he published A Queer Kind of Death, his first novel, which was met with considerable acclaim, not least for his creation of gay black detective Pharaoh Love. The influential New York Times critic Anthony Boucher said in his review that, "This is a detective story, and unlike any other that you have read. No brief review can attempt to convey its quality. I merely note that it deals with a Manhattan subculture wholly devoid of ethics or morality, that staid readers may well find it 'shocking', that it is beautifully plotted and written with elegance and wit ... and that you must under no circumstances miss it." A critical analysis of the book can be found in The Lost Library: Gay Fiction Rediscovered. Love would be the central figure in two immediate sequels Swing Low Sweet Harriet (1967) and Topsy and Evil (1968) and also two later novels, A Queer Kind of Love (1994) and A Queer Kind of Umbrella (1995).

Baxt also wrote a long series of period mysteries, combining his love of detective stories and Hollywood movies by featuring real celebrities solving fictional murder cases in the style of Stuart M. Kaminsky's 'Toby Peters' books, starting with The Dorothy Parker Murder Case (1984) and concluding twelve volumes later with The Clark Gable and Carole Lombard Murder Case in 1998, often featuring detective Jacob Singer. Baxt himself appears as a character in The Tallulah Bankhead Murder Case (1987), which is set in 1952 during the HUAC hearings.

He died of complication from heart surgery.

== Awards ==
Awards for Baxt's writing
Year	Title	Award	Result	Ref.
1968	A Parade of Cockeyed Creatures	Edgar Award for Best Novel	Finalist	
1989	Who’s Next	Lambda Literary Award for Gay Mystery	Finalist	
1994	Mae West Murder Case	Lambda Literary Award for Gay Mystery	Finalist	
1995	Queer Kind of Love	Lambda Literary Award for Gay Mystery	Finalist	
1996	Queer Kind of Umbrella	Lambda Literary Award for Gay Mystery	Finalist	

== Publications ==
=== Pharaoh Love series ===
- A Queer Kind of Death (1966)
- Swing Low Sweet Harriet (1967)
- Topsy and Evil (1968)
- A Queer Kind of Love (1994)
- A Queer Kind of Umbrella (1995)

=== Plotkin and Van Larsen series ===
- A Parade of Cockeyed Creatures; or, Did Someone Murder Our Wandering Boy? (1967)
- "I!" Said the Demon (1969)
- Satan Is a Woman (1987)

=== Jacob Singer series ===
- The Dorothy Parker Murder Case (1984)
- The Alfred Hitchcock Murder Case (1986)
- The Tallulah Bankhead Murder Case (1987)
- The Talking Pictures Murder Case (1990)
- The Greta Garbo Murder Case (1992)
- The Noël Coward Murder Case (1992)
- The Marlene Dietrich Murder Case (1993)
- The Mae West Murder Case (1993)
- The Bette Davis Murder Case (1994)
- The Humphrey Bogart Murder Case (1995)
- The William Powell and Myrna Loy Murder Case (1996)
- The Fred Astaire and Ginger Rogers Murder Case (1997)
- The Clark Gable and Carole Lombard Murder Case (1998)

=== Standalone novels ===
- The Affair at Royalties (1971)
- Burning Sappho (1972)
- The Neon Graveyard (1979)
- Process of Elimination (1984)
- Who's Next? (1988)

== Filmography ==
=== Television ===
- Sword of Freedom
- Ivanhoe (1958 TV series)
- No Hiding Place
- The Defenders (TV series)
- Tales of the Unexpected (TV series)

=== Film ===
- Circus of Horrors (1960)
- The City of the Dead (1960) (a.k.a. Horror Hotel)
- Payroll (1961)
- Shadow of the Cat (1961)
- Night of the Eagle (1962)
- Strangler's Web (1965)
