= Dolores Klaich =

American writer, teacher and activist (1936–2023)

- Born: August 9, 1936 Cleveland, Ohio, U.S.
- Died: March 8, 2023 (aged 86) Brattleboro, Vermont, U.S.
- Occupation: Author, activist, teacher, journalist
- Education: Case Western Reserve University; State University of New York Stony Brook
- Genre: Feminism
- Notable works: Heavy Gilt; Woman Plus Woman
- Notable awards: Nominated for the Lambda Literary Award for Lesbian Mystery (1985)

Dolores Klaich (August 9, 1936 – March 8, 2023) was an American feminist author, activist, teacher and journalist. She wrote about the social history of lesbians in the United States of America, and wrote a mystery novel that was nominated for the Lambda Literary Award for Lesbian Mystery. She taught sexual health and safety at State University of New York's School of Health, Technology and Management for a decade, and played a significant role in the first National Women's Conference as a delegate from New York.

== Early life and education ==
Klaich was born in Cleveland, Ohio. Her mother was Caroline (née Stampar) Klaich, and her father, Jacob Klaich, was an organizer for the Socialist Labor Party. She was one of three daughters, the oldest being Stella (née Klaich) Bolog and another daughter who died in infancy. She graduated from Case Western Reserve University in 1958, and completed her post-graduate education at State University of New York Stony Brook.

== Career ==
In the 1960s and 1970s, Klaich was a reporter for LIFE Magazine and an editor for the Transatlantic Review. In 1974, Klaich published a social history of lesbians in the United States of America in 1974, titled Woman Plus Woman. The book consisted of personal interviews, reporting, and biographies. Klaich's book has been cited as a notable contribution to literature on attitudes towards lesbians in the 1970s, and a founding text in identifying and correcting misconceptions about lesbians, in popular culture and writing. The book had a significant social impact at the time, resulting in a number of public speeches, reprints, and radio readings.

In 1988, Klaich wrote a mystery novel titled Heavy Gilt. The book was nominated for the inaugural Lambda Literary Award for Lesbian Mystery in 1985, and was written as a spoof of mystery novels, satirizing prevailing attitudes towards lesbians.

In 1977, Klaich was a delegate from New York to the National Women's Conference, and was part of a caucus that secured the passage of a resolution to protect and recognise sexual preferences. She was a judge for the Ferro-Grumley Awards, which is an LGBT literary award, in 1989 and 1990. From 1989 to 1999, Klaich was an educator in sexual health and AIDS for the State University of New York Stony Brook. Klaich has been profiled in Feminists Who Changed America 1963-1975 (University of Illinois Press) and Who's Who of American Women.

== Death ==
Klaich died via assisted suicide at her home in Brattleboro, Vermont, on March 8, 2023. She chose to die on International Women's Day, with the help of Vermont's Act 39 for medical aid in dying.

== Publications ==
- Woman Plus Woman (University of Michigan, 1974) ISBN 0-941-48328-2
- Heavy Gilt (Naiad Press, 1988) ISBN 9-780-94148-3254
- Klaich, Dolores. "The price of going mainstream." The Gay & Lesbian Review Worldwide 22.3 (2015): 16–18.
- Klaich, Dolores. "What's Lost on the Road to Equality." The Gay & Lesbian Review Worldwide 26.1 (2019): S195-S195
- Klaich, Dolores. "Family Stories." Harrington Lesbian Fiction Quarterly 1.2 (2000): 47-57
