= Mark Richard Zubro =

American novelist

Mark Richard Zubro is an American mystery novelist. He lives in Mokena, Illinois and taught 8th grade English at Summit Hill Jr. High in nearby Frankfort Square, Illinois.

Zubro writes bestselling mysteries set in Chicago and the surrounding Cook County area, which are widely praised as fast-paced, with interesting plots and well-rounded, likeable characters. His novels feature gay themes, and Zubro is himself gay.

His longest running series features high school teacher Tom Mason, and Tom's boyfriend, professional baseball player Scott Carpenter. The other series Zubro is known for is the Paul Turner mysteries, which are about a Chicago police detective. The books are a part of the Stonewall Inn Mystery series, published by St. Martin's Press. Zubro won a Lambda Literary Award for Gay Mystery for his book A Simple Suburban Murder.

== Books ==
=== Tom and Scott mysteries ===
- A Simple Suburban Murder (1990)
- Why Isn't Becky Twitchell Dead? (1991)
- The Only Good Priest (1991)
- The Principal Cause of Death (1992)
- An Echo of Death (1995)
- Rust on the Razor (1996)
- Are You Nuts? (1999)
- One Dead Drag Queen (2001)
- Here Comes the Corpse (2002)
- File Under Dead (2004)
- Everyone's Dead But Us (2006)
- Schooled in Murder (2008)
- Another Dead Republican (2012)
- A Conspiracy of Fear (2014)

=== Paul Turner mysteries ===
- Sorry Now? (1991)
- Political Poison (1994)
- Another Dead Teenager (1996)
- The Truth Can Get You Killed (1998)
- Drop Dead (1999)
- Sex and Murder.com (2002)
- Dead Egotistical Morons (2003)
- Nerds Who Kill (2005)
- Hook, Line, and Homicide (2007)
- Black and Blue and Pretty Dead Too (2011)
- Pawn of Satan (2013)

=== Roger and Steve young adult mysteries ===
- Safe (2014)
- Hope (2015)
- Always (2018)

=== Alien Danger gay science fiction trilogy ===
- Alien Quest (2013)
- Alien Home (2014)
- Alien Victory (2015)

=== Shane and Corey teen mysteries ===
- Gentle (2016)
- Forever (2020)
- Peace (2024)
