= Michael Craft =

American author (born 1950)

Michael Craft Johnson (born 1950), who publishes under the pen name Michael Craft, is an American author of more than 20 novels, many of which are in the mystery genre, with gay protagonists. The first installment of his Dante & Jazz mystery series, Desert Getaway, was a 2023 MWA Edgars nominee for the Lilian Jackson Braun Award. The second installment, Desert Deadline, was a Gold Winner of the IBPA Benjamin Franklin Award for LGBTQ, as was his 2019 mystery, ChoirMaster. Four of the books in his Mark Manning mystery series were finalists for the Lambda Literary Award for Gay Mystery.

== Personal life ==
In 1950, Craft was born in Elgin, Illinois, where he remained until he ventured to the University of Illinois at Urbana-Champaign. In the 1980s, he moved to Kenosha, Wisconsin, where he met his life partner and future husband, Leon, in 1982.

In 2005, Craft moved to California, near Palm Springs. When California legalized same-sex marriage in 2013, Craft and Leon were wed. The couple now lives in Rancho Mirage, California.

== Education ==
As a child, Craft attended Catholic grade school for eight years, then high school at Elgin Academy, where he graduated in 1968 as class valedictorian.

Craft studied graphic design at the University of Illinois at Urbana-Champaign, graduating with highest honors in 1972. He remained in Urbana to pursue a graduate degree at the Institute for Communications Research but left the program to accept a job in Chicago in 1976.

Later, in 2007, Craft received a Master of Fine Arts degree in creative writing from Antioch University, Los Angeles.

== Career ==
Craft began his career at the Chicago Tribune as a graphic designer and art director for the newspaper's various features sections, a position he held for 10 years. While at the Tribune, he moved to Kenosha, Wisconsin, traveling to and from Chicago by train, and during those commutes he wrote the first draft of his debut novel.

Craft left the Tribune in 1987 to work for his partner's family-owned business, which manufactured musical wind instruments. During that time, he was able to focus in earnest on his writing.

In 1991, Craft's debut novel, Rehearsing, was accepted by Los Hombres Press, a small publisher of gay-interest books, based in San Diego. The book was released in February 1993.

In the early 2000s, Craft began playwriting and screenwriting. His stage play Photo Flash was produced in 2003 in Wisconsin, then in 2008 in California. In 2011, he was involved in the production of Pink Squirrels, a feature-length independent film.

== Awards ==
Awards for Craft's writing
Year	Title	Award	Result	Ref.
1994	Rehearsing	Society of Midland Authors' Adult Fiction Award	Finalist	
2001	Name Games	Lambda Literary Award for Gay Mystery	Finalist	
2002	Boy Toy	Lambda Literary Award for Gay Mystery	Finalist	
2003	Hot Spot	Lambda Literary Award for Gay Mystery	Finalist	
2018	FlabberGassed	Muse Medallion for Cat Mystery	Finalist	
2019	ChoirMaster	Muse Medallion for Mystery Novel	Finalist	
2020	ChoirMaster	Lambda Literary Award for Gay Mystery	Finalist	
2020	ChoirMaster	IBPA Benjamin Franklin Award for LGBTQ	Gold	
2023	Desert Getaway	MWA Lilian Jackson Braun Award	Finalist	
2024	Desert Deadline	IBPA Benjamin Franklin Award for LGBTQ	Gold	

== Publications ==
=== Stand-alone novels ===
- Rehearsing (1993)
- The MacGuffin (2011)
- Inside Dumont: A Novel in Stories (2016)

==== Claire Gray mystery series ====
- Desert Autumn (2001)
- Desert Winter (2003)
- Desert Spring (2004)
- Desert Summer (2005)

==== Mark Manning mystery series ====
- Flight Dreams (1997)
- Eye Contact (1998)
- Body Language (1999)
- Name Games (2000)
- Boy Toy (2001)
- Hot Spot (2002)
- Bitch Slap (2004)

==== Mister Puss mystery series ====
- FlabberGassed (2018)
- ChoirMaster (2019)
- HomeComing (2020)

==== Dante & Jazz mystery series ====
- Desert Getaway (2022)
- Desert Deadline (2023)
- Desert Reunion (2024)

==== Anthology contributions ====
- Outer Voices, Inner Lives, edited by Mark McNease (2014)
- Palm Springs Noir, edited by Barbara DeMarco-Barrett (2021)

=== Plays ===
- Photo Flash (2003, 2008)
