= Marshall Thornton =

American writer

Marshall Thornton is an American writer of gay and lesbian mysteries best known for his Boystown series. He has won the Lambda Literary Award for Gay Mystery three times, and has been a finalist for the award six times. He has also been a finalist for the Lambda Literary Award for Gay Romance twice, and placed second for the Rainbow Award for Gay Romantic Comedy in 2016.

== Biography ==
Thornton was born in Pittsburgh, Pennsylvania, then lived in the Adirondack Mountains as a teenager. He lived in Chicago for seven years before moving to Los Angeles, where he lived for nearly three decades. He now lives in Northern Lower Michigan.

He received a Master of Fine Arts in Screenwriting from the University of California, Los Angeles.

== Awards ==
Year	Title	Award	Result	Ref.
2012	Three Nick Nowak Mysteries	Lambda Literary Award for Gay Mystery	Finalist	
2014	Murder Book	Lambda Literary Award for Gay Mystery	Finalist	
2015	From the Ashes	Lambda Literary Award for Gay Mystery	Finalist	
2016	Bloodlines	Lambda Literary Award for Gay Mystery	Winner	
2016	Femme	Rainbow Award for Gay Romantic Comedy	Second	
2017	Femme	Lambda Literary Award for Gay Romance	Finalist	
2018	Gifts Given	Lambda Literary Award for Gay Mystery	Finalist	
2018	Night Drop	Lambda Literary Award for Gay Mystery	Winner	
2019	Heart’s Desire	Lambda Literary Award for Gay Mystery	Finalist	
2019	Late Fees: A Pinx Video Mystery	Lambda Literary Award for Gay Mystery	Winner	
2020	Code Name: Liberty	Lambda Literary Award for Gay Romance	Finalist	
2020	Rewind	Lambda Literary Award for Gay Mystery	Finalist	

== Publications ==
- The Christmas Visit (2008)
- The Beneficiary (2009)
- Coffee Clutch (2009)
- Simple Addition (2009)
- Bartholi's Rest (2010)
- Coyote Bluff (2010)
- Lucky is Lost (2010)
- Desert Run (2011)
- Full Release (2011)
- The Ghost Slept Over (2014)
- My Favorite Uncle (2014)
- Snowman With Benefits (2014)
- Aunt Belle's Time Travel & Collectibles (2017)
- Never Rest (2018)
- Code Name: Liberty (2019)
- Fathers of the Bride (2021)

=== Boystown series ===
The following books are listed in story order, not publishing order:

- The Boystown Prequels: Two Nick Nowak Novellas
  - Little Boy Dead (2012)
  - Little Boy Afraid (2017)
- Three Nick Nowak Mysteries (2009)
  - Little Boy Found
  - Little Boy Burned
  - Little Boy Fallen
- Three More Nick Nowak Mysteries (2010)
  - Little Boy Silent
  - Little Boy Blond
  - Little Boy Loved
- Two Nick Nowak Novellas (2011)
  - Little Boy Boom
  - Little Boy Tenor
- A Time For Secrets (2012)
- Murder Book (2013)
- From the Ashes (2013)
- Bloodlines (2015)
- The Lies That Bind (2016)
- Lucky Days (2017)
- Gifts Given (2017)
- Heart's Desire (2018)
- Broken Cord (2019)
- Fade Out (2020)

=== The Perils of Praline series ===
- The Perils of Praline: Or, the Amorous Adventures of a Southern Gentleman in Hollywood (2010)
- Praline Goes To Washington: Or, the Erotic Misdeeds of a Newly Native Californian in Our Nation's Capitol (2017)

=== Jan Birch Mysteries series ===
- The Development: Three Jan Birch Mysteries (2011)
- Mountain View Terrace (2011)

=== Femme series ===
- Femme (2016)
- Masc (2018)

=== A Pinx Video Mystery series ===
- Night Drop (2017)
- Hidden Treasures (2018)
- Late Fees (2018)
- Rewind (2019)
- Cash Out (2020)

=== The Wyandot County Mysteries series ===
- The Less Than Spectacular Times of Henry Milch (2020)
- A Fabulously Unfabulous Summer for Henry Milch (2022)

=== Dom Reilly Mysteries series ===
- Year of the Rat (2021)
- A Mean Season (2022)
- The Happy Month (2024)
