= Janice Law =

American novelist

- Born: 1941 (age 84–85)
- Education: Syracuse University; University of Connecticut
- Occupations: Novelist; short story writer
- Writing career
- Genre: Mystery fiction
- Notable awards: Lambda Literary Award for Mystery (2013)
- Website: www.janicelaw.com

Janice Law (born 1941), also known as Janice Law Trecker, is an American mystery novelist and short story writer. She has written for Alfred Hitchcock's Mystery Magazine, Ellery Queen's Mystery Magazine, Sherlock Holmes Mystery Magazine, The Midwest Quarterly, The American Scholar, and the American Quarterly. She is best known for her Anna Peters series of novels, which was one of the first to feature a female detective.

Law is a graduate of Syracuse University and the University of Connecticut, where she served as an instructor and assistant professor of English.

Law was nominated for an Edgar Award in 1977 for her first Anna Peters novel, The Big Payoff. In 2013, she was nominated for the Lambda Literary Award for Gay Mystery for Fires of London, the first novel in her Francis Bacon series, and won the award the following year for its sequel, The Prisoner of the Riviera.

== Awards ==
Year	Title	Award	Result	Ref.
1977	The Big Payoff	Edgar Award for Best First Novel	Finalist	
2013	Fires of London	Lambda Literary Award for Gay Mystery	Finalist	
2014	The Prisoner of the Riviera	Lambda Literary Award for Gay Mystery	Winner	
2015	Moon Over Tangier	Lambda Literary Award for Gay Mystery	Finalist	
2017	Nights in Berlin	Lambda Literary Award for Gay Mystery	Finalist	

== Publications ==
=== Anna Peters mysteries ===
- The Big Payoff (1975)
- Gemini Trip (1977)
- Under Orion (1978)
- The Shadow of the Palms (1980)
- Death Under Par (1980)
- Time Lapse (1998)
- Backfire (1994)
- Cross-Check (1997)

=== Francis Bacon mysteries ===
- Fires of London (2012)
- The Prisoner of the Riviera (2013)
- Moon Over Tangier (2014)
- Nights in Berlin (2016)
- Afternoons in Paris (2017)
- Mornings in London (2017)

=== Other works ===
- Preachers, Rebels, and Traders: Connecticut, 1818-1865 (1975)
- Women on the Move (1975)
- All the King's Ladies (1986)
- The Countess (1989)
- Infected Be the Air (1991)
- A Safe Place to Die (1995)
- The Night Bus (2000)
- The Lost Diaries of Iris Weed (2002)
- Voices (2003)
- Blood in the Water and Other Secrets (2011)
