= Beth Trembley =

American academic and author

- Awards: Lambda Literary Award for Lesbian Mystery (2009)

Academic background
- Education: Hope College (BA, 1985); University of Chicago (MA, 1986; PhD, 1991)
- Website: elizabethtrembley.com

Elizabeth A. Trembley, who uses the pen name Josie Gordon, is an American academic and author. She taught at Hope College. Trembley's books include Michael Crichton (1996), Whacked (2008), Toasted (2009), Ditched (2011), and Look Again (2022). She is also co-editor of It's a Print! (1994) and contributed to the Great Women Mystery Writers: Classic to Contemporary (1994) and Fresh Water: Women Writing on the Great Lakes (2006) anthologies.

== Education ==
Trembley earned a Bachelor of Arts in English from Hope College in 1985, after which she attended the University of Chicago, earning a Master of Arts in English language and literature and 1986 and a Doctor of Philosophy in English language and literature in 1991.

== Career ==
As an academic, Trembley taught courses related to literature, creative writing, comics, and sketchnoting. She retired from Hope College in 2019, though taught a single comics course in 2024.

Trembley's books include Michael Crichton: A Critical Companion (1996), Whacked (2008), Toasted (2009), Ditched (2011), and Look Again (2022). She is also co-editor of It's a Print! (1994) and contributed to the Great Women Mystery Writers: Classic to Contemporary (1994) and Fresh Water: Women Writing on the Great Lakes (2006) anthologies.

Whacked, Toasted, and Ditched are part of a mystery series that follows Lonnie Squires, a gay Episcopalian priest. Whacked won the 2009 Lambda Literary Award for Lesbian Mystery. Toasted was a finalist for the same award in 2010.

Trembley published Look Again, a graphic memoir, with Street Noise in 2022. The book examines a moment in 1996 when she discovered a man's dead body in the woods, as well as how her body as reacted and responded to that moment over time. The story discusses emotional reactions including stoicism, rationality, fear, and paranoia, as well as themes related to trauma, self-esteem, shame, and internalized homophobia. Publishers Weekly referred to the work as "inventive and introspective" and noted that "by carefully unfolding the emotional complexities of trauma and memory, Trembley has created a quasi-psychological/therapeutic thriller, one crafted with equal parts mystery, honesty, and empathy". Emilia Packard, writing for Library Journal, described it as "intense, articulate, and self-reflective", highlighting how it "makes one look hard at the shifting nature of memory". The American Library Association included Look Again on their list of Best Graphic Novels for Adults. It was also a finalist for the 2022 Excellence in Graphic Literature Award for Adult Non-Fiction.

As of 2026, Trembley works for the Sequential Artists Workshop, where she teaches how to write graphic memoir.

== Personal life ==
As of 2026, Trembley lives in Michigan with her spouse, who is an Episcopalian priest.

== Books ==
=== As Elizabeth A. Trembley ===
- Reynolds, William; Trembley, Elizabeth A., eds. (1994). It's a Print!: Detective Fiction from Page to Screen. Bowling Green State University Popular Press. ISBN 0-87972-662-8.
- Trembley, Elizabeth A. (1994). "Sara Paretsky". In Gregory Klein, Kathleen (ed.). Great Women Mystery Writers: Classic to Contemporary. Greenwood Press. pp. 266–268. ISBN 978-0-313-28770-1.
- Trembley, Elizabeth A. (1996). Michael Crichton: A Critical Companion. Critical Companions to Popular Contemporary Writers. Bloomsbury Academic. ISBN 978-0-313-29414-3.
- Trembley, Elizabeth A. (2006). "Against the Law". In Swan, Alison (ed.). Fresh Water: Women Writing on the Great Lakes. Michigan State University Press. ISBN 0-87972-662-8.
- Trembley, Elizabeth A. (2022). Look Again. Street Noise. ISBN 978-1-95149118-5.

=== As Josie Gordon ===
- Gordon, Josie (2008). Whacked. Bella Books. ISBN 978-1-594-93650-0.
- Gordon, Josie (2009). Toasted. Bella Books. ISBN 978-1-642-47563-0.
- Gordon, Josie (2011). Ditched. Bella Books. ISBN 978-1-642-47564-7.
