= Stan Leventhal =

American novelist

- Born: May 24, 1951
- Died: January 15, 1995 (aged 43)
- Writing career
- Period: 1980s–1990s
- Genre: LGBT literature
- Notable works: Mountain Climbing in Sheridan Square, Fault Lines, Black Marble Pool

Stan Leventhal (May 24, 1951 – January 15, 1995) was an American writer and magazine editor. Primarily known as the editor in chief of Heat Publications, a publisher of gay erotic magazines including Mandate, Torso and Inches, he also wrote and published several works of LGBT literature in the 1980s and 1990s. He published three novels and two short story collections during his lifetime; two additional novels were published following his death of AIDS in 1995.

In addition he founded Amethyst Press, a now-defunct publishing company which specialized in LGBT books, including his own books and titles by Dennis Cooper, Bo Huston, Steve Abbott, Kevin Killian, Patrick Moore and Mark Ameen.

He garnered three Lambda Literary Award nominations, in 1989 for Mountain Climbing in Sheridan Square, in 1990 for Fault Lines and in 1991 for Black Marble Pool.

== Works ==
=== Novels ===
- Mountain Climbing in Sheridan Square (1988, ISBN 978-0934411080)
- Fault Lines (1989, ISBN 978-0934411264)
- Black Marble Pool (1990, ISBN 978-0927200059)
- Skydiving on Christopher Street (1995, ISBN 978-1563332876)
- Barbie in Bondage (1996, ISBN 978-1563334153)

=== Short stories ===
- A Herd of Tiny Elephants (1988, ISBN 978-0934411134)
- Candy Holidays and Other Short Fictions (1991, ISBN 978-0934411516)
