= Jessica Thomas =

Australian netball player

Personal information
- Born: 21 July 1984 (age 41) Mitcham, Australia
- Relative: Dale Thomas (brother)

Netball career
- Playing positions: GD, GK, WD
Years	Club team	Apps
2005–06	Melbourne Phoenix	
- Updated on 2009-03-29

Jessica Thomas (born 21 July 1984) is an Australian netball player. Having grown up in her home town of Drouin, West Gippsland she was added to the Melbourne Phoenix squad in the middle of the 2005 Commonwealth Bank Trophy, as a replacement for Kara Richards who had to withdraw due to school and travel issues. She continued with Phoenix throughout the 2005 and 2006 seasons. Jess Thomas's brother, Dale Thomas is an Australian footballer for Australian Football League team Collingwood. She plays for the Phoenix goal defence, goal keeper or wing defence.

Thomas played for Gippsland Storm in 2007, in Championship division of the Victorian State League competition as a goaler.
