= Cheryl A. Head =

American fiction writer (born 1950s)

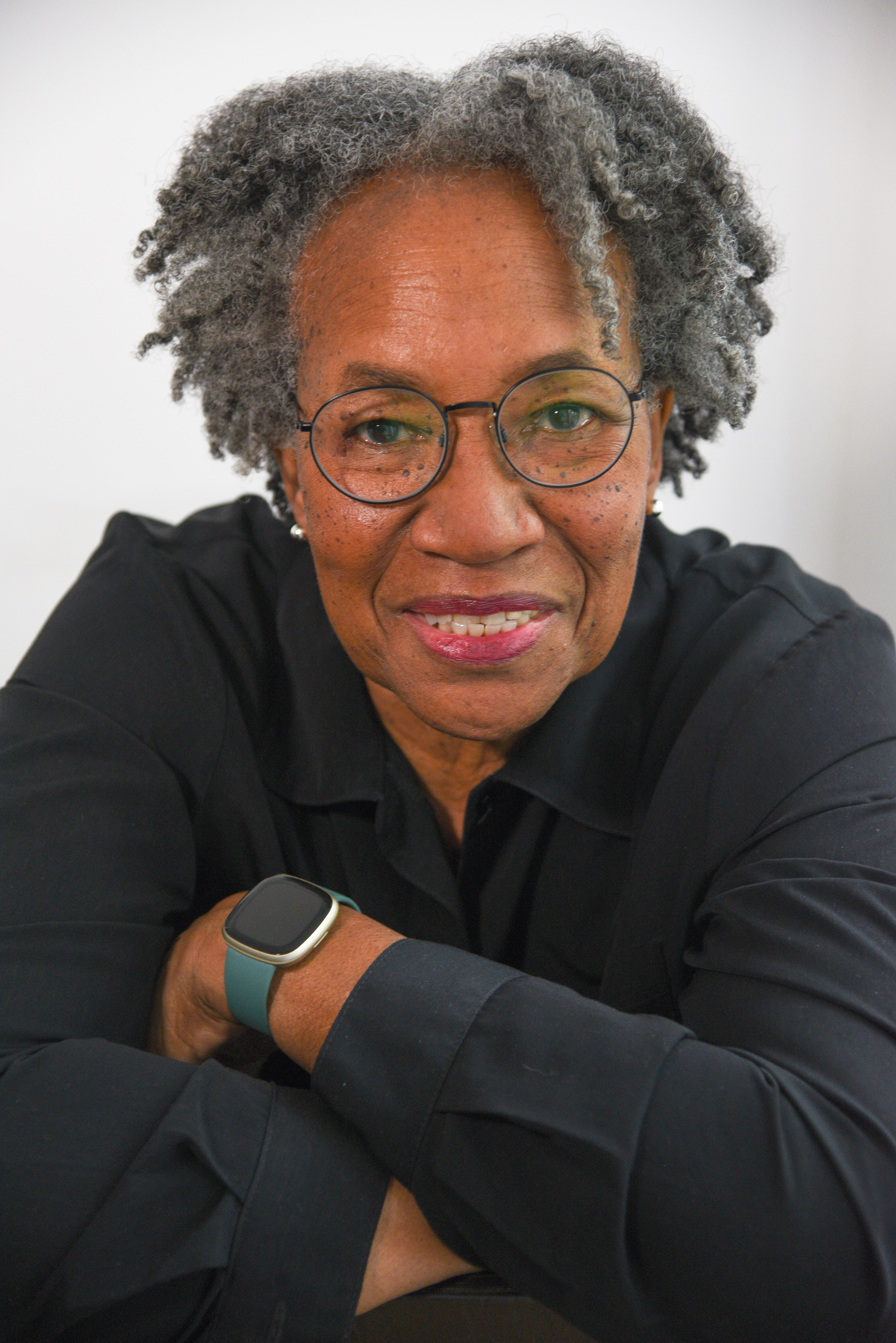
- Born: Detroit, Michigan, U.S.
- Education: Wayne State University; Ohio University
- Writing career
- Genres: Fiction, historical fiction, mystery, crime fiction
- Notable awards: Golden Crown Literary Society’s Ann Bannon Popular Choice Award, Saints and Sinners Fiction Contest, Independent Publisher Book Awards, Torchbearers Award
- Literary movement: crime fiction, queer fiction, historical fiction
- Website: www.cherylhead.com

Cheryl A. Head is an American author, former television producer, broadcast executive, and organizer. She is the author of the Charlie Mack Motown mysteries, whose female PI protagonist is queer and Black. She is also author of Time's Undoing published in 2023. Head is a two-time Anthony Award nominee, a two-time Lambda Literary Award finalist, a Los Angeles Times Book Prize finalist, an Agatha Award finalist, and a Next Generation Indie Book Award finalist. She is the winner of the 2026 Saints and Sinners Literary Festival Fiction Contest, and winner of the Golden Crown Literary Society's Ann Bannon Popular Choice Award, for Judge Me When I'm Wrong, the fourth book of the Charlie Mack Motown Mystery series. Her books are included in the Detroit Public Library's African American Booklist and the Special Collections of the Library of Michigan. In 2019, Head was named to the Hall of Fame of the New Orleans Saints and Sinners Literary Festival, and was awarded the Alice B Readers Award in 2022. Head's short story, Finding Jimmy Baldwin will be included in the 2026 edition of the Best American Mystery and Suspense.

== Biography ==
Head was born in Detroit, Michigan. She attended Wayne State University, intending to focus on pre-law, but was "bitten by the media bug" and shifted to Media and Communications, receiving a B.A. Head worked at television stations: WDIV and Detroit Public Television (WTVS), and public radio station WDET. She received a master's degree in telecommunications management at Ohio University. She moved to Washington, D.C., in the 1990s to work in public broadcasting. After working as a TV and radio field reporter, anchor, production executive, and media grant maker in Detroit and Washington, D.C., Head retired early to focus on a writing career. Head is a member of the Bouchercon (World Mystery Conference) and is Co-Chair of Bouchercon 2027 in Washington, DC. Head is also a member of Sisters in Crime, Mystery Writers of America, and Crime Writers of Color.

Head's work includes: The six-part Charlie Mack Motown Series, a World War II historical novel, and an historical-fiction novel based upon the tragic loss of Head's grandfather who died in 1929, in Birmingham Jim Crow Alabama, at the hands of the police. That book, Time’s Undoing, was a 2023 Indie Next pick, an Amazon Best Book of March, and Amazon Editors Pick for Best Mystery, Thriller, and Suspense.

== Works ==
=== Charlie Mack Motown Mystery series ===
- Bury Me When I'm Dead, Bywater Books, 2016
- Wake Me When It's Over, Bywater Books, 2018
- Catch Me When I'm Falling, Bywater Books, 2019
- Judge Me When I'm Wrong, Bywater Books, 2019
- Find Me When I'm Lost, Bywater Books, 2020
- Warn Me When It's Time, Bywater Books, 2021

=== Historical Novels ===
- Long Way Home: A World War II Novel, CS/Amz Press, 2014
- Time’s Undoing: A Novel, Dutton Books, 2023

=== Short stories ===
- in Our Happy Hours: LGBT Voices from the Gay Bars Flashpoint Publications/Editors: S. Renee Bess & Lee Lynch)
- in Paranoia Blues: Crime Fiction Inspired by the Songs of Paul Simon Down and Out Books/Editor: Josh Pachter
- in Every Day a Little Death: Crime Fiction Inspired by the Songs of Stephen Sondheim Level Best Books/Editor: Josh Pachter)
- in Double Crossing Van Dine Crippen and Landru/Editor: Jeffrey Marks)
- in Crime Ink: Iconic-An Anthology of Crime Fiction Inspired by Queer Icons Bywater Books/Editors John Copenhaver and Salem West)
- in "SASFest 2026 Fiction Anthology Saints and Sinners Festival/Editors: Morgan Hufstader and Paul J. Willis)

== Awards and recognition ==
- 2026 Torchbearer "Carrying Change" Legend Award

== Select interviews/podcasts ==
Scrawl Space – Interview with Cheryl A. Head: Author of riveting mysteries, champion of diversity (in fiction and beyond)

Literary Hill – Q & A With “Warn Me When It’s Time” Author Cheryl A. Head

Books Are Magic – Time's Undoing with Cheryl A. Head

Authors on the Air – Time's Undoing

Thoughts from a Page – Time's Undoing

BCPL – Interview conducted at the Creatures, Crimes, & Creativity Con with Cheryl Head

Write-minded Podcast – Cheryl A. Head: How We Can Reclaim Our Stories Through Fiction

Wicked Authors – A Wicked Welcome to Cheryl Head

Crime Writers of Color – Cheryl Head and Time's Undoing with Robert Justice

== Select reviews ==
- Time’s Undoing
- Time’s Undoing
- Time’s Undoing
- Warn Me When It's Time
- Find Me When I'm Lost
- Judge Me When I'm Wrong
- Catch Me When I’m Falling
- Catch Me When I'm Falling
- Wake Me When It's Over
- Bury Me When I’m Dead
- Long Way Home: A World War II Novel
