= Stevie Mikayne =

Canadian writer of mystery novels

- Occupations: mystery novelist, children's writer
- Years active: 2010s-present
- Notable work: UnCatholic Conduct, Illicit Artifacts

Stevie Mikayne is a Canadian writer of mystery novels. She is a two-time Lambda Literary Award nominee in the Lesbian Mystery category, for UnCatholic Conduct at the 27th Lambda Literary Awards and for Illicit Artifacts at the 28th Lambda Literary Awards.

She has also published a series of children's books, Emlyn and the Gremlin, under the pen name Steff F. Kneff.

== Works ==
=== as Stevie Mikayne ===
- Jellicle Girl (2012)
- Weight of Earth (2013)
- UnCatholic Conduct (2014)
- Illicit Artifacts (2015)

=== as Steff F. Kneff ===
- Emlyn and the Gremlin (2014)
- Emlyn and the Gremlin and the Barbeque Disaster (2014)
- Emlyn and the Gremlin and the Mean Old Cat (2014)
- Emlyn and the Gremlin and the Seaside Mishap (2015)
- Emlyn and the Gremlin and the Teenage Sitter (2016)
