= Grant Michaels =

American novelist (1947–2009)

- Born: 1947; Lawrence, Massachusetts
- Died: July 2, 2009 (aged 61–62)
- Resting place: West Roxbury, Massachusetts
- Occupation: Mystery writer
- Writing career
- Language: English
- Years active: 1990s

Michael Mesrobian (1947 – July 2, 2009), better known by the pen name of Grant Michaels, was an American writer of mystery novels. He published six novels with St. Martin's Press in the 1990s, centering on Stan Kraychik, a gay hairdresser turned amateur detective. All six novels were shortlisted Lambda Literary Award finalists in the Gay Mystery category.

== Works ==
- A Body to Dye For (1990)
- Love You to Death (1992)
- Dead on Your Feet (1993)
- Mask for a Diva (1994)
- Time to Check Out (1996)
- Dead as a Doornail (1998)
