= John Copenhaver =

American writer (born 1974)

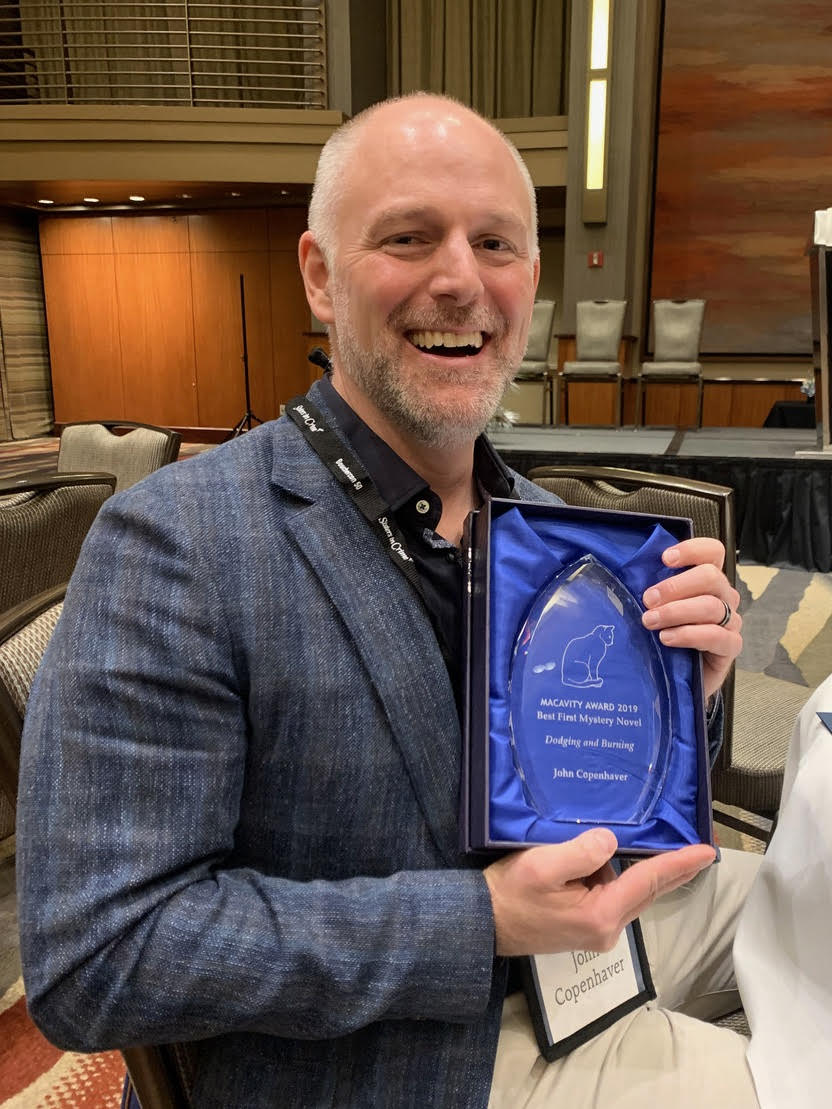
- Education: Davidson College (B.A.); Middlebury College (M.A.); George Mason University (M.F.A.)
- Occupation: Author
- Website: https://johncopenhaver.com/

John Copenhaver (born May 26, 1974) is an American writer of crime fiction whose works include Dodging and Burning (2018), The Savage Kind (2022), and Hall of Mirrors (2024).

== Early life ==
John Copenhaver was born in Marion, Virginia. He graduated from Davidson College in 1997. He pursued further education and obtained his MA from Middlebury College's Bread Loaf School of English in 2004 and MFA from George Mason University in 2005.

== Career ==
From 2015 to 2021, Copenhaver wrote a crime fiction review column for Lambda called "Blacklight" on LGBTQ+ crime fiction. His writing has appeared in CrimeReads, Writer’s Digest, LitHub, Electric Lit, PANK magazine, New York Journal of Books, and Washington Independent Review of Books.

He is a founding member of Queer Crime Writers, an organization founded in 2019 to promote community and collaboration among authors of crime fiction who identify as LGBTQIA+ and celebrate the long history of queer writers in the genre. He worked with writer Al Warren on House of Mystery Radio Show, an interview talk show focusing on nonfiction and fiction crime writers, and is an at-large board member of Mystery Writers of America.

Copenhaver's debut novel, Dodging and Burning, was published by Pegasus Books in 2018. It is a mystery set in a small Virginia town where "three friends—Jay Greenwood, Bunny Prescott, and Ceola Bliss—spend the summer of 1945 trying to solve the apparent murder of a young woman who Jay photographed." Library Journal said, "Copenhaver makes a powerful debut with this unconventional novel that mixes a coming-of-age tale with a puzzling mystery and a haunting portrait of the experiences of the LGBTQ community in the 1940s. Admirers of William Kent Krueger’s Edgar Award–winning stand-alone, Ordinary Grace, may appreciate this candid story."

The Savage Kind: A Mystery (Pegasus Books, 2021), Copenhaver's first novel in the Nightingale series, takes place in 1940s Washington, DC. This novel "follows two teenage girls who grow close while solving a murder mystery and, in the process, discover that they are each more capable of cruelty than they realized." Publishers Weekly said, "Copenhaver’s tale unfolds via breathless diary entries from both girls, strung together by an anonymous narrator in 1963. A profusion of devastating twists complements the pulp-noir tone and keeps readers on tenterhooks, and a tentative romance between Judy and Philippa adds depth.” Library Journal described the book as," jam-packed with noir themes and plot twists. Sure to please fans of queer fiction and twisty mysteries."

The second book in his Nightingale series, Hall of Mirrors: A Novel (Pegasus Books, 2024), continues Philippa and Judy's story in the 1950s during the Lavender Scare. Sarah Weinman of The New York Times said, "[the novel] has haunted me since I've finished it." It was one of Today's 6 must-read books for Pride Month, on The Washington Post's 12 Thrillers to Read This Summer, and included on Oprah's Book Club's "Sizzling Summer Mysteries."

He is a multiple recipient of Artist Fellowships from the DC Commission on the Arts and Humanities. In 2015, he was awarded the Larry Neal Writers’ Award for Adult Fiction by the DC Commission.

He is passionate about amplifying LGBTQ+ voices through his writing and teaching. He currently teaches at the University of Nebraska MFA in Creative Writing Program in Omaha, NE, and Virginia Commonwealth University in Richmond, Virginia.

== Bibliography ==
Titles Authored by John Copenhaver
Year	Title	Genre	Publisher	Notes
2018	Dodging and Burning: A Mystery	Mystery	Pegasus Books	Winner of the 2019 Macavity Award for Best First Novel Nominated for 2019 Barry, Lambda Literary, Strand, and Anthony Awards
2021	The Savage Kind: A Mystery (Nightingale Trilogy, 1)	Mystery	Pegasus Books	Winner of the 2022 Lambda Literary Award for LGBTQ Mystery
2024	Hall of Mirrors: A Novel (A Judy Nightingale and Philippa Watson Mystery)	Mystery	Pegasus Books	A New York Times Best Crime Novel of the Year, Washington Post and TODAY.com must-read book selection

== Awards and recognition ==
Copenhaver's debut novel, Dodging and Burning: A Mystery (Pegasus Books, 2018) won the 2019 Macavity Award for Best First Novel and garnered the following nominations: Anthony Award for First Best Novel, Strand Critics Award for Best Debut Novel, Barry Award for Best First Novel, and Lambda Award for Best Gay Mystery. This novel also received attention from the literary community in Washington, DC, and critical attention nationally.

The Savage Kind won the Lambda Literary Award for Best LGBTQ Mystery and was nominated for Left Coast Crime's 2022 Best Historical Mystery.

The Hall of Mirrors was a New York Times Best Crime Novel of the Year and a Washington Post and TODAY.com must-read book selection.
