= Venus Throw =

Highest roll in the Ancient Roman gambling game of tali

The Venus Throw was the highest roll in the Ancient Roman gambling game of tali (knucklebones). The game was played with four 4-sided rectangular dice numbered I, III, IV and VI, usually made from sheep's or goat's knucklebones. In a Venus Throw, each talus landed on a different side, yielding as a score of 14. A gambler would either throw the tali from his or her hand, or from a small box (called a fritillus). Thirty-five different throws were possible (found by sending 4 and 4 to the combination with repetitions formula). While the Venus throw was the highest, the Vulture throw (all aces)—also known as the Dog throw —was the lowest. The Venus throw could be used to designate the master of the revels.
