= Mabel Maney =

American novelist

- Born: New Jersey, U.S.
- Education: Ohio State University; San Francisco State University (MFA)
- Occupations: Artist; author
- Writing career
- Genre: Lesbian pulp fiction

Mabel Maney is an American artist and author from San Francisco, California known for her lesbian pulp fiction. She is the author of the Nancy Clue series, a lesbian parody of the Nancy Drew, Cherry Ames, and Hardy Boys series. More recently, she is the author of the "Jane Bond" novels, a series of parodies of James Bond. Mabel's short fiction can also be found in the humor anthology, "May Contain Nuts".

Maney is famous for the quote "For a long time I thought I wanted to be a nun. Then I realized that what I really wanted to be was a lesbian."

Mabel was born in New Jersey. Her family moved to the midwest where she was educated and permanently scarred by dour nuns. She was one of five children in an Irish Catholic family in Appleton, Wisconsin where she worked in her family's paper hat factory. She graduated from Ohio State University with a bachelor's degree in Journalism and received a Master of Fine Arts degree from San Francisco State University. Her MFA thesis explored the subtext of novels featuring 1940s heroine Nurse Cherry Ames.

== Bibliography ==
- The Case of the Not-So-Nice Nurse (Nancy Clue Mysteries) (1992) ISBN 1-57344-226-7; ISBN 978-1-57344-226-8
- The Case of the Good-for-Nothing Girlfriend (1994) ISBN 1-57344-227-5; ISBN 978-1-57344-227-5
- A Ghost in the Closet (Hardly Boys Mysteries) (1995) ISBN 1-57344-228-3; ISBN 978-1-57344-228-2
- Kiss the Girls and Make Them Spy: An Original Jane Bond Parody (2001) ISBN 978-0-380-80310-1; ISBN 0-380-80310-0 (a finalist for a Lambda Literary Award)
- The Girl with the Golden Bouffant: An Original Jane Bond Parody (2004) ISBN 0-380-80311-9; ISBN 978-0-380-80311-8
- May Contain Nuts: A Very Loose Canon of American Humor (2004) ISBN 0-06-051626-7; ISBN 978-0-06-051626-0

== Sources ==
- Mabel Maney Biography at HarperCollins
- Mabel Maney entry at GLBTQ: Encyclopedia of Gay, Lesbian, Bisexual, Transgender & Queer Culture] (1995)
