= Garry Ryan =

Canadian writer

- Occupations: novelist, mystery
- Writing career
- Period: 2000s–present

Garry Ryan is a Canadian writer. Best known for his Detective Lane series of mystery novels, he has also published works of historical fiction.

Ryan studied education at the University of Calgary, and worked for over 30 years as a teacher in Calgary, Alberta's public school system. He retired from teaching in 2009. Although heterosexual, Ryan was inspired to make Detective Lane, the lead character in his mystery novels, gay after witnessing the discrimination and bullying that two of his students faced after coming out as gay.

He has published ten Detective Lane novels to date. His novel The Lucky Elephant Restaurant won a Lambda Literary Award in the Gay Mystery category at the 19th Lambda Literary Awards in 2007. In 2009, Ryan was awarded Calgary's Freedom of Expression Award. He was a nominee for Smoked at the 23rd Lambda Literary Awards in 2011, for Malabarista at the 24th Lambda Literary Awards in 2012 and for Foxed at the 26th Lambda Literary Awards in 2014. Ryan has also published two novels to date in his Blackbirds series, a historical trilogy about Sharon Lacey, a female aviator serving in the Air Transport Auxiliary during World War II.

Ryan teamed with Pages Books on Kensington to publish Corporation's First Annual Sausage Festival - (2018 - ISBN 978-1-9995135-0-4)

== Works ==
=== Detective Lane Mysteries ===
- Queen's Park (2004, ISBN 978-1896300849)
- The Lucky Elephant Restaurant (2006, ISBN 978-1896300979)
- A Hummingbird Dance (2008, ISBN 978-1897126318)
- Smoked (2010, ISBN 978-1897126622)
- Malabarista (2011, ISBN 978-1897126899)
- Foxed (2013, ISBN 978-1927063408)
- Glycerine (2014, ISBN 978-1927063682)
- Indiana Pulcinella (2016, ISBN 978-1-926455-57-0)
- Matanzas - (2017- ISBN 978-1-988732-09-1)
- Sea of Cortez - (2018 - ISBN 978-1-988732-39-8)

=== Blackbirds Trilogy ===
- Blackbirds (2012, ISBN 978-1927063217)
- Two Blackbirds (2014, ISBN 978-1927063507)

=== Pages Books ===
- Corporation’s First Annual Sausage Festival (2018 - ISBN 978-1-9995135-0-4)
