= Gardenland, Sacramento, California =

Gardenland is a neighborhood in the city of Sacramento, California, around the Natomas Basin. It borders Northgate Boulevard to the west, Indiana Avenue to the north, Steelhead Creek to the east, and the Arden-Garden Connector to the south. It is the richest agricultural area within city limits.

Many residents that reside in Gardenland argue that Gardenland is from Bowman Avenue to Columbus Avenue surrounded by the levee and Northgate Boulevard, with Bowman Avenue as the center because of the park and the levee.

== History ==
Gardenland was established during the 1920s, by immigrant farm workers and railroad employees and was named Gardenland because of the trees; others say because of the large land lots where anything "grew", whatever the case it is a haven of rich agriculture filled with beautiful landscape and scenery. As of 1940 it was an unincorporated, with much of its population being of Mexican or Portuguese descent.

In 1970, Gardenland Park was built at the end of Bowman Avenue, bringing festivals and sports activities to the community. During the summer the city of Sacramento provided a recreational program that would delight the neighborhood children and supply sack lunches throughout the summer months.

Also during the 1970s, sidewalks and a sophisticated drainage system were installed removing the hazardous ditches and flood ways and improving the roads. Lights were installed on all the streets and in and around Gardenland Park.

== Climate ==
Gardenland has a Mediterranean climate characterized by mild winters and dry, hot summers. The area usually has low humidity. Rain typically falls only between November and March, with the rainy season tapering off almost completely by the end of April. The average temperature throughout the year is 61 °F (16 °C), with the daily average ranging from 46 °F (8 °C) in December and January to 76 °F (24 °C). Average daily high temperatures range from 53 °F (12 °C) in December and January to 93 °F (34 °C) in July (with many days of over 100 F (38 °C) highs). Daily low temperatures range from 38 to 58 °F (3 to 14 °C).

The average year has 73 days with a high over 90 °F (32 °C), with the highest temperature on record being 115 °F (46 °C) on July 25, 2006, and 18 days when the low drops below 32 °F (0 °C), with the coldest day on record being December 11, 1932, at 17 °F (−8 °C). Summer 2007, however, could be the hottest ever on record with a possible drought due to winter 2007 being drier than normal. Average yearly precipitation is 17.4 inches (440 mm), with almost no rain during the summer months, to an average rainfall of 3.7 inches (94 mm) in January. It rains, on average, 58 days of the year. In February 1992, Sacramento had 16 consecutive days of rain (6.41 inches or 163 mm). A record 7.24 inches (184 mm) of rain fell on April 20, 1880.

On average, 96 days in the year have fog, mostly in the morning (tule fog), primarily in December and January. The fog can get extremely dense, lowering visibility to less than 100 feet (30 m) and making driving conditions hazardous.

The record snowfall was recorded on January 4, 1888, at 9 cm (3.5 in). Snowfall is rare in Gardenland (with an elevation of only 52 feet or 16 m above sea level), with a dusting of snow every eight to ten years.

== People ==
During the 1950s through the early 1980s, Gardenland had the highest population of Mexican-Americans in the city of Sacramento. Most of these Hispanic residents worked for the Southern Pacific Railroad, Campbell Soup factory, and Blue Diamond Almond Growers.

Sacramento is notably diverse racially, ethnically, and by household income. The city also has a notable lack of inter-racial disharmony. In 2002, Time magazine and the Civil Rights Project of Harvard University identified Sacramento as the most racially/ethnically integrated major city in America. The U.S. Census Bureau also groups Sacramento with other U.S. cities having a "High Diversity" rating of the diversity index.
