= John Morgan Wilson =

American journalist and author (born 1945)

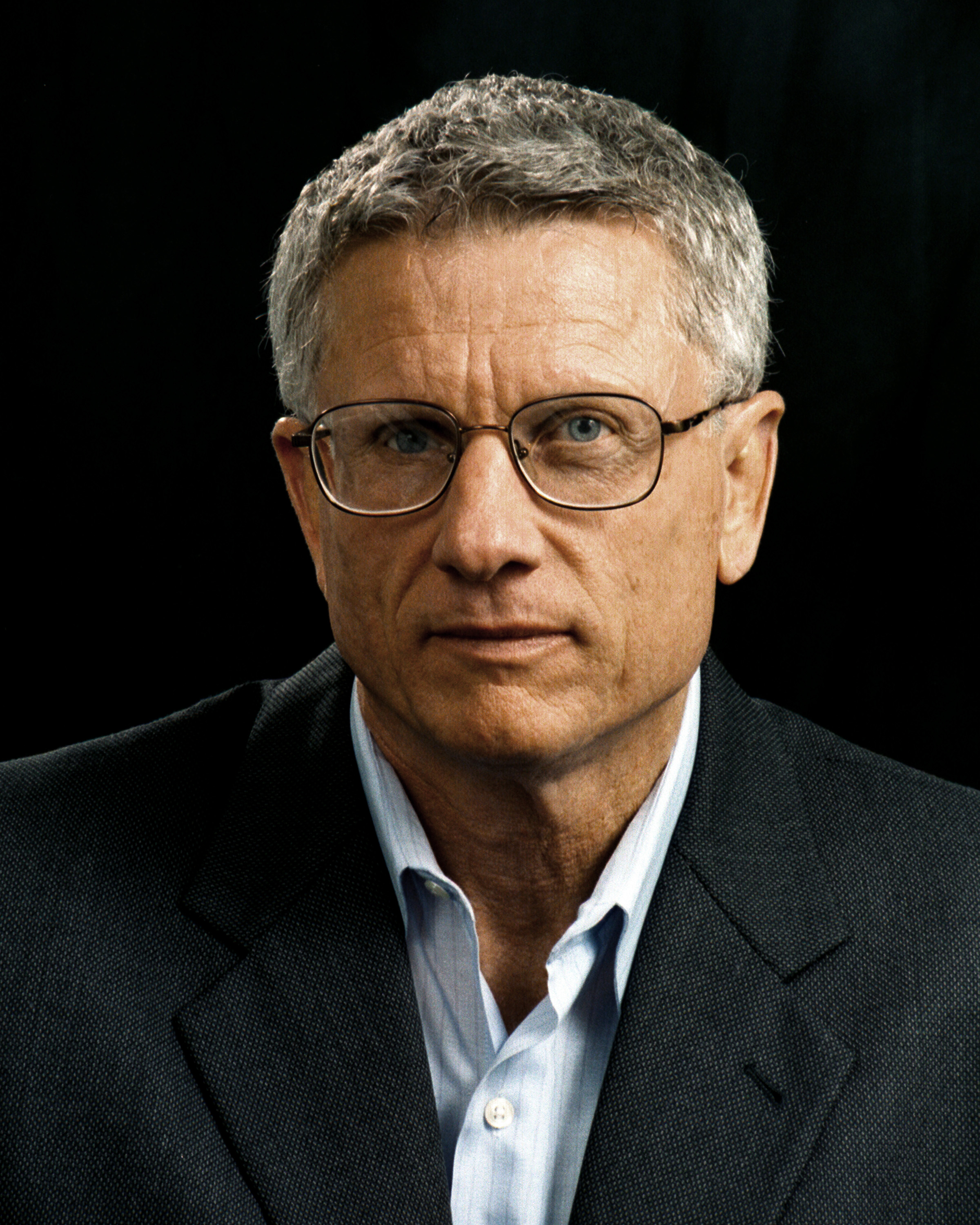
- Wilson in 2020
- Born: September 19, 1945 (age 81); Florida, United States
- Occupations: Novelist; journalist
- Writing career
- Genre: Detective story
- Notable awards: Edgar Award 1997 for best first novel, 3× winner Lambda Literary Award for best detective story

John Morgan Wilson (born September 19, 1945) is an American journalist and author of crime fiction, notably the Benjamin Justice mystery novels. The books feature a reclusive ex-reporter, ruined by a Pulitzer scandal and haunted by personal loss, who operates out of West Hollywood, California, becoming enmeshed in murder investigations in and around Los Angeles.

Simple Justice led the series in 1996, winning the Mystery Writers of America Edgar Allan Poe Award for Best First Novel. Six of the eight Justice mysteries, including Simple Justice, were nominated for the Lambda Literary Award for Best Gay Men's Mystery, three of them winning in that category.

Originally published by Doubleday (the first four books) and St. Martin's Press (the last four), the series was revived in late 2020 when ReQueered Tales (RQT) released Simple Justice in a revised 25th anniversary edition, with a foreword by Christopher Rice. At that time, RQT announced plans to publish two titles a year until all eight were available in ebook and paperback formats.

== Early life and early reporting ==
Wilson was born on an Army air base in Tampa, Florida, where his doctor father served as a captain in the Medical Corps. As World War Two ended, the family returned home to Southern California, where Wilson and his older sister grew up in Manhattan Beach Manhattan Beach, California, southwest of Los Angeles. Their parents divorced in 1950 and they were raised by their mother, a high school English teacher, who later remarried. In 1963, Wilson graduated from Mira Costa High School, where his wrestling coach, Jack Fernandez, encouraged him to pursue writing as a possible career, a path Wilson had not previously considered.

At age 19, after dropping out of Michigan State University, Wilson broke into reporting as a sports correspondent for a local newspaper, the South Bay Daily Breeze. Summer reporting jobs at other newspapers followed after he enrolled at San Diego State College (now University), where he was an award-winning reporter and columnist for the campus newspaper. Along the way, he took his first fiction-writing classes, sold his first magazine pieces, and served as captain of the wrestling team. In 1968, he graduated with a B.A. in journalism, continuing his newspaper work while freelancing for small magazines.

In 1970, he founded Easy Reader, an alternative community paper in Hermosa Beach, California, that he later passed on to Kevin Cody, the current publisher. In 2020, Wilson touched on the paper's origins in an essay celebrating Easy Reader's 50th anniversary.

In 1972, he relocated to Venice Beach, came out as a gay man and became active in the burgeoning LGBT movement. Twenty years later he settled in West Hollywood, the eventual setting for his Benjamin Justice mysteries. He married his longtime companion, artist Pietro Gamino, in 2013.

== Print journalism and TV work ==
By 1975, Wilson was established as a full-time freelance writer. Over the years, his byline appeared in dozens of publications, including the New York Times, Los Angeles Times, Washington Post, Boston Globe, Chicago Tribune Magazine, TV Guide, Los Angeles, and the Advocate. During a fifteen-year span, he wrote regular columns for Writer's Digest on freelance print markets and later the screenplay marketplace.

In the mid-1980s, he established a home base at the Los Angeles Times when he was offered an assistant editor's position with the Sunday arts and entertainment section. Wilson continued to be a prolific freelance contributor at the Times, self-syndicating his own articles and earning a Certificate of Excellence for Reporting on Media from the Los Angeles Press Club.

In 1992, he transitioned to television, first as a writer-producer with Entertainment Daily Journal ("EDJ"), a half-hour program syndicated weekdays by Fox Entertainment News, and later as a writer or writer-producer of documentary and other fact-based programming that aired on Fox, the Discovery Channel, the History Channel, the Learning Channel, and Court TV. Although he freelanced for a number of production companies, most of his work was with Langley Productions on first responder or crime-related series, including CODE 3, Anatomy of Crime, and Video Justice.

During this period, Wilson also wrote two nonfiction books, The Complete Guide to Magazine Article Writing (1993) and Inside Hollywood: A Writer's Guide to Researching the World of Movies and TV (1998), both published by Writer's Digest Books.

== The Benjamin Justice Mysteries ==
Wilson's first novel, Simple Justice, was released in 1996. In a starred review, Booklist, the magazine of the American Library Association, judged it "an exceptionally fine debut" and People selected it as the magazine's "Beach Book of the Week." The following year, it was honored by Mystery Writers of America with an Edgar Allan Poe Award for Best First Novel and nominated by the Lambda Literary Foundation for a "Lammy" in the Best Gay Men's Mystery category.

Seven more Justice titles were released over the next eleven years, ending with Spider Season (2008).

Although Doubleday published the first four books with titles provided by the author, St. Martin's insisted he drop Justice from his next four titles for marketing purposes. Wilson complied, although he believed the change would confuse some readers and booksellers. Bold Strokes Books later reissued the first four, while the remaining books gradually went out of print. When ReQueered Tales (RQT) acquired the rights in 2019 to bring back all eight books, Wilson reverted to his original plan, retitling the last four books.

Before RQT reissued Simple Justice in 2020, Wilson made significant revisions to the text, explaining why in an author's note included in the book.

== Other fiction writing ==
Wilson wrote two Phillip Damon mysteries, Blue Moon (2002) and Good Morning, Heartache (2003), with New York society bandleader Peter Duchin, published by Berkley Berkley Books.

Wilson's short fiction has appeared in Ellery Queen Mystery Magazine, Alfred Hitchcock Mystery Magazine, Blithe House Quarterly, and numerous anthologies. In 2015, he reflected on his winding path to short story writing in an essay posted by longtime Ellery Queen editor Janet Hutchings on her literary blog, Something Is Going to Happen.

Throughout his decades as an author, Wilson has been represented by the same literary agent, Alice Martell.

== Teaching and volunteer activity ==
From 1978 to 2008, Wilson was an instructor with the UCLA Extension Writers' Program, teaching classes and workshops in both nonfiction and fiction. He continues to appear at book festivals, writer conferences and related events to discuss various aspects of the writing craft.

For nearly a decade, he served on the planning committee of the West Hollywood Book Fair; in 2009, the City presented him with its Algonquin West Hollywood Community Award for service to the city through his writing and volunteer work.

He has also served on the board of the Southern California Chapter of Mystery Writers of America, which honored him with its Distinguished Service Award in 2004; as a writing conference workshop coordinator for the Los Angeles chapter of Sisters in Crime; and as a mentor in PEN America's Emerging Voices Fellowship program.

== Bibliography ==
Benjamin Justice Mysteries (with revised titles for future publication)

1. Simple Justice (1996/2020)
2. Revision of Justice (1997)
3. Justice at Risk (1999)
4. The Limits of Justice (2000)
5. Blind Eye (2003) (to be retitled Justice Be Damned)
6. Moth and Flame (2004) (to be retitled A Blueprint for Justice)
7. Rhapsody in Blood (2006) (to be retitled Justice Enchained)
8. Spider Season (2008) (to be retitled Justice at the Edge)

Phillip Damon Mysteries with Peter Duchin

1. Blue Moon (2002)
2. Good Morning, Heartache (2003)

Nonfiction (Writer's Digest Books)

1. The Complete Guide to Magazine Article Writing (1993)
2. Inside Hollywood: A Writer's Guide to Researching the World of Movies and TV (1998).

== Prizes and distinctions ==
1. Edgar Award 1997 for Best First Novel for Simple Justice
2. Nomination for Lambda Literary Award 1997 for best Gay Men's Mystery for Simple Justice
3. Lambda Literary Award 1999 for best Gay Men's Mystery for Justice at Risk
4. Lambda Literary Award 2000 for best Gay Men's Mystery for The Limits of Justice
5. Lambda Literary Award 2003 for Gay Men's Mystery for Blind Eye
6. Nomination for Lambda Literary Award 2004 for best Gay Men's Mystery for Moth and Flame
7. Nomination for Lambda Literary Award 2008 for best Gay Men's Mystery for Spider Season
