= Roger Margason =

American novelist

Franklyn Roger Margason (November 14, 1933 – November 1, 2015) who used the pseudonym of Dorien Grey, was an openly gay American author, (born in Northern Illinois). Margason served in the U.S. Navy and graduated from Northern Illinois University with a BA in English.

Margason was the author of the fourteen-book Dick Hardesty mystery series, which received a WordWeaving Series of Excellence award, and four of which have been finalists for the Lambda Literary Award. He was also the author of the four-book Elliott Smith Paranormal Mystery series. In addition to his two series, he had a stand-alone gay western/romance/adventure novel, Calico, aimed at young adults and traditional western buffs; Short Circuits: A Life in Blogs; Dreams of a Calico Mouse, a book of poetry; and A World Ago: a Navy Man's Letters Home, 1954-1956.

All his books are in the process of becoming audiobooks.

== Works ==
The Dick Hardesty Mystery Series

1. The Butcher's Son† (2000) ISBN 1-879194-86-4
2. The Ninth Man (2000) ISBN 1-879194-78-3
3. The Bar Watcher (2001) ISBN 1-879194-79-1
4. The Hired Man† (2002) ISBN 1-879194-76-7
5. The Good Cop (2002) ISBN 1-879194-75-9
6. The Bottle Ghosts (2003) ISBN 1-879194-73-2
7. The Dirt Peddler (2003) ISBN 1-879194-72-4
8. The Role Players† ISBN 1-879194-49-X
9. The Popsicle Tree (2005) ISBN 1-879194-55-4
10. The Paper Mirror† (2005) ISBN 1-879194-57-0
11. The Dream Ender (2007) ISBN 1-934135-62-3
12. The Angel Singers (2008) ISBN 978-1-934841-06-8
13. The Secret Keeper (2009) ISBN 978-1-934841-42-6
14. The Peripheral Son (2011) ISBN 978-1-936144-10-5
15. The Serpent's Tongue (2014) ISBN 978-1-61271-136-2

The Elliott Smith Mysteries Series

- His Name Is John (2008) ISBN 978-1-934841-04-4
- Aaron's Wait (2009) ISBN 1-934841-40-4
- Caesar's Fall (2010) ISBN 978-1-936144-08-2
- Dante's Circle (2012) ISBN 978-1-612710-65-5

Other works

- Calico (2006) ISBN 1-934135-33-X
- Short Circuits: A Life in Blogs (2011) ASIN: B00584R12S
- A World Ago: a Navy Man's Letters Home, 1954-1956 (2012) ISBN 9781611875416

† Denotes Lambda Literary Award finalists
