= 11th Lambda Literary Awards =

1999 literary awards ceremony

The 11th Lambda Literary Awards were held in 1999 to honour works of LGBT literature published in 1998.

== Special awards ==
Category	Winner
Editor's Choice Award	Naeem Murr, The Boy
Pioneer Award	Katherine V. Forrest
Publisher Service Award	Joan M. Drury, Spinsters Ink

== Nominees and winners ==
Category	Author/Editor	Title	Result
Anthologies (Fiction)	Byrne R. Fone (ed.)	Columbia Anthology of Gay Literature	Winner
Anthologies (Fiction)	Michele Karlsberg and Aren X. Tulchinsky	To Be Continued	Finalist
Anthologies (Fiction)	Lawrence Schimel	Mammoth Book of Gay Erotica	Finalist
Anthologies (Fiction)	Joel Tan	Men on Men 7	Finalist
Anthologies (Fiction)	Joel Tan	Queer PAPI Porn	Finalist
Anthologies (Nonfiction)	Nisa Donnelly (ed.)	Mom: Candid Memoirs by Lesbians About the First Woman in Their Life	Winner
Anthologies (Nonfiction)	David L. Eng	Q & A: Queer in Asian America	Winner
Anthologies (Nonfiction)	Lucy Jane Bledsoe	Lesbian Travels	Finalist
Anthologies (Nonfiction)	Clifford Chase	Queer 13: Lesbian and Gay Writers Recall Seventh Grade	Finalist
Anthologies (Nonfiction)	Kevin Jennings	Telling Tales Out of School	Finalist
Children's and Young Adult	Kevin Jennings	Telling Tales Out of School	Winner
Children's and Young Adult	Francesca Lia Block	I Was a Teenage Fairy	Finalist
Children's and Young Adult	Clifford Chase	Queer 13: Lesbian and Gay Writers Recall Seventh Grade	Finalist
Children's and Young Adult	Michael Thomas Ford	Outspoken	Finalist
Children's and Young Adult	Joseph Kennedy	Lucy Goes to the Country	Finalist
Drama	Holly Hughes	O Solo Homo	Winner
Drama	Eve Ensler	The Vagina Monologues	Finalist
Drama	Jim Grimsley and David Roman	Mr. Universe and Other Plays	Finalist
Drama	D. A. Miller	Place For Us	Finalist
Drama	Sarah Schulman	Stagestruck	Finalist
Gay Biography and Autobiography	William J. Mann	Wisecracker	Winner
Gay Biography and Autobiography	Graham Caveney	Gentleman Junkie: The Life and Legacy of William S. Burroughs	Finalist
Gay Biography and Autobiography	Gavin Geoffrey Dillard	In the Flesh	Finalist
Gay Biography and Autobiography	Norman Page	Auden and Isherwood: The Berlin Years	Finalist
Gay Biography and Autobiography	Andrew Tobias	The Best Little Boy in the World Grows Up	Finalist
Gay Fiction	Mark Merlis	An Arrow's Flight	Winner
Gay Fiction	Rabih Alameddine	Koolaids: The Art of War	Finalist
Gay Fiction	Michael Cunningham	The Hours	Finalist
Gay Fiction	Jameson Currier	Where the Rainbow Ends	Finalist
Gay Fiction	Keith Ridgway	The Long Falling	Finalist
Gay Mystery	R. D. Zimmerman	Outburst	Winner
Gay Mystery	Randy Boyd	Uprising	Finalist
Gay Mystery	Fred Hunter	Federal Fag	Finalist
Gay Mystery	Grant Michaels	Dead as a Doornail	Finalist
Gay Mystery	Richard Stevenson	Strachey’s Folly	Finalist
Gay Poetry	J. D. McClatchy	Ten Commandments	Winner
Gay Poetry	Mark Doty	Sweet Machine	Finalist
Gay Poetry	Edward Field	A Frieze for a Temple of Love	Finalist
Gay Poetry	Michael Lassell	A Flame for the Touch That Matters	Finalist
Gay Poetry	Timothy Liu	Say Goodnight	Finalist
Gay Studies	John Loughery	The Other Side of Silence	Winner
Gay Studies	Michael Bronski	The Pleasure Principle	Finalist
Gay Studies	Molly McGarry and Fred Wasserman	Becoming Visible	Finalist
Gay Studies	Will Roscoe	Changing Ones	Finalist
Gay Studies	Andrew Sullivan	Love Undetectable: Notes on Friendship, Sex, and Survival	Finalist
Humor	Michael Thomas Ford	Alec Baldwin Doesn’t Love Me and Other Trials of My Queer Life	Winner
Humor	Alison Bechdel	Split-Level Dykes to Watch Out For	Finalist
Humor	Alison Bechdel	The Indelible Alison Bechdel: Confessions, Comix, and Miscellaneous Dykes to Watch Out	Finalist
Humor	Kate Clinton	Don’t Get Me Started	Finalist
Humor	Dan Savage	Savage Love: Straight Answers from America's Most Popular Sex Columnist	Finalist
Lesbian Biography and Autobiography	Alison Bechdel	The Indelible Alison Bechdel: Confessions, Comix, and Miscellaneous Dykes to Watch Out	Winner
Lesbian Biography and Autobiography	Sally Cline	Radclyffe Hall: A Woman Called John	Finalist
Lesbian Biography and Autobiography	Joan Nestle	A Fragile Union	Finalist
Lesbian Biography and Autobiography	Rodger Streitmatter	Empty Without You	Finalist
Lesbian Biography and Autobiography	Kate Summerscale	The Queen of Whale Cay	Finalist
Lesbian Fiction	Dorothy Allison	Cavedweller	Winner
Lesbian Fiction	Sharon Bridgforth	the bull-jean stories	Finalist
Lesbian Fiction	Rebecca Brown	The Dogs	Finalist
Lesbian Fiction	Erika Lopez	They Call Me Mad Dog	Finalist
Lesbian Fiction	Sarah Schulman	Shimmer	Finalist
Lesbian Mystery	Sarah Dreher	Shaman's Moon	Winner
Lesbian Mystery	Nicola Griffith	The Blue Place	Winner
Lesbian Mystery	Ellen Hart	Wicked Games	Finalist
Lesbian Mystery	Randye Lordon	Mother May I	Finalist
Lesbian Mystery	Claire McNab	Past Due	Finalist
Lesbian Poetry	Gerry Gomez Pearlberg	Marianne Faithfull's Cigarette	Winner
Lesbian Poetry	Beatrix Gates	In the Open	Finalist
Lesbian Poetry	Letta Neely	Juba	Finalist
Lesbian Poetry	Leslea Newman	The Little Butch Book	Finalist
Lesbian Poetry	Pamela Sneed	Imagine Being More Afraid of Freedom than Slavery	Finalist
Lesbian Studies	Joan Nestle	A Fragile Union	Winner
Lesbian Studies	Zsa Zsa Gershick	Gay Old Girls	Finalist
Lesbian Studies	Judith Halberstam	Female Masculinity	Finalist
Lesbian Studies	Sarah Schulman	Stagestruck: Theater, AIDS, and the Marketing of Gay America	Finalist
Lesbian Studies	Barbara Smith	The Truth That Never Hurts	Finalist
Science fiction, fantasy or horror	Nicola Griffith and Stephen Pagel (eds.)	Bending the Landscape II: Science Fiction	Winner
Science fiction, fantasy or horror	Clive Barker	Galilee	Finalist
Science fiction, fantasy or horror	Elizabeth Brownrigg	Falling to Earth	Finalist
Science fiction, fantasy or horror	Ulysses G. Dietz	Desmond	Finalist
Science fiction, fantasy or horror	Lawrence Schimel	Things Invisible to See	Finalist
Small Press	Sharon Bridgforth	the bull-jean stories	Winner
Small Press	Alison Bechdel	The Indelible Alison Bechdel: Confessions, Comix, and Miscellaneous Dykes to Watch Out	Finalist
Small Press	Randy Boyd	Uprising	Finalist
Small Press	Bruce LaBruce	The Reluctant Pornographer	Finalist
Small Press	Barbara Summerhawk	Queer Japan	Finalist
Spirituality	Donna Minkowitz	Ferocious Romance	Winner
Spirituality	Perry Brass	How to Survive Your Own Gay Life	Finalist
Spirituality	Peter J. Gomes	Sermons: Biblical Wisdom for Daily Living	Finalist
Spirituality	John J. McNeill	Both Feet Firmly Planted in Midair	Finalist
Spirituality	Richard Rambuss	Closet Devotions	Finalist
Transgender / Bisexual	Michael R. Gorman	The Empress Is a Man	Winner
Transgender / Bisexual	Leslie Feinberg	Trans Liberation	Finalist
Transgender / Bisexual	Judith Halberstam	Female Masculinity	Finalist
Transgender / Bisexual	Diane Wood Middlebrook	Suits Me: The Double Life of Billy Tipton	Finalist
Transgender / Bisexual	Will Roscoe and Stephen Murray	Boy-Wives and Female Husbands	Finalist
Visual Arts	David Leddick	The Male Nude	Winner
Visual Arts	Barbara Seyda and Diana Herrera	Women in Love	Winner
Visual Arts	Deborah Bright	The Passionate Camera	Finalist
Visual Arts	Russell Bush	Affectionate Men	Finalist
Visual Arts	Molly McGarry and Fred Wasserman	Becoming Visible	Finalist
