= 14th Lambda Literary Awards =

2002 literary awards ceremony

The 14th Lambda Literary Awards were held in 2002 to honour works of LGBT literature published in 2001. The event was held at the Tribeca Rooftop on DesBrosses Street in Tribeca and hosted by poet Emanuel Xavier.

== Nominees and winners ==
Category	Winner	Nominated
Anthologies/Fiction	Helen Sandler, ed., Diva Book of Short Stories	Nicola Griffith and Stephen Pagel, Bending the Landscape: Horror; Jess Wells, Love Shook My Heart 2; Jay Quinn, Rebel Yell: Stories by Contemporary Southern Gay Authors; Quang Bao, Hanya Yanagihara and Timothy Liu, Take Out: Queer Writing from Asian Pacific America
Anthologies/Non-Fiction	Delroy Constantine-Simms, ed., The Greatest Taboo: Homosexuality in Black Communities	Catherine Reid and Holly K. Iglesias, His Hands, His Tools, His Sex, His Dress: Lesbian Writers on Their Fathers; Terry Goldie, In a Queer Country; Rebecca Alpert, Sue Levi Elwell and Shirley Idelson, Lesbian Rabbis: The First Generation; Winston Leyland, Out in the Castro
Autobiography/Memoir	Andrew Solomon, The Noonday Demon: An Atlas of Depression	Carol Guess, Gaslight; Kirk Read, How I Learned to Snap; Brian Bouldrey, Monster: Adventures in American Machismo; William Storandt, Outbound
Biography	Barry Werth, The Scarlet Professor: Newton Arvin	Alison Lurie, Familiar Spirits: A Memoir of James Merrill and David Jackson; Caroline Zilboorg, The Masks of Mary Renault; Margaret Reynolds, The Sappho Companion; Nancy Mitford, Savage Beauty: The Life of Edna St. Vincent Millay
Children's/Young Adult	Julia Watts, Finding H.F.	Sara Ryan, Empress of the World; Marilyn Reynolds, Love Rules; Alex Sánchez, Rainbow Boys; Todd Tuttle, Spot
Erotica	Ian Philips, See Dick Deconstruct: Literotica for the Satirically Bent	M. Christian, Dirty Words; Lawrence Schimel, His Tongue; Aren X. Tulchinsky, Hot & Bothered 3; Lori Selke, Tough Girls: Down and Dirty Dyke Erotica
Gay Fiction	Allan Gurganus, The Practical Heart	JT LeRoy, The Heart Is Deceitful Above All Things; Tom Spanbauer, In the City of Shy Hunters; David Leavitt, The Marble Quilt; David Ebershoff, The Rose City
Gay Mystery	Michael Nava, Rag and Bone	Michael Craft, Boy Toy; Dorien Grey, The Butcher's Son; Warren Dunford, Making a Killing; Mark Richard Zubro, Sex and Murder.Com
Gay Poetry	Mark Doty, Source	Constantine Cavafy, Before Time Could Change Them; Justin Chin, Harmless Medicine; Timothy Liu, Hard Evidence; J.D. McClatchy, Love Speaks Its Name
Humor	David Rakoff, Fraud	Patrick Price, Drama Queen; Erika Lopez, Hoochie Mama: The Other White Meat; Ellen Orleans, The Inflatable Butch; Michael Thomas Ford, My Little Book of Neuroses
Lesbian Fiction	Achy Obejas, Days of Awe	Erika Lopez, Hoochie Mama: The Other White Meat; Ann Wadsworth, Light, Coming Back; Sylvia Brownrigg, Pages for You; Alexandra Grilikhes, Yin Fire
Lesbian Mystery	Ellen Hart, Merchant of Venus	Alex Marcoux, Back to Salem; Mabel Maney, Kiss the Girls and Make Them Spy; Pat Welch, Moving Targets; Lauren Maddison, Witchfire
Lesbian Poetry	Adrienne Rich, Fox	Letta Neely, Here; Gerry Gomez Pearlberg, Mr. Bluebird; Eileen Myles, Skies; Daphne Gottlieb, Why Things Burn
LGBT Studies	Joyce Murdoch and Deb Price, Courting Justice: Gay Men and Lesbians v. the Supreme Court	Suzanna Danuta Walters, All the Rage: The Story of Gay Visibility in America; William J. Mann, Behind the Screen: How Gays and Lesbians Shaped Hollywood, 1910-1969; Ricardo J. Brown and William Reichard, The Evening Crowd at Kirmser's; Gay Wachman, Lesbian Empire: Radical Crosswriting
Photography/Visual Arts	David Deitcher, Dear Friends: American Photographs of Men Together, 1840-1918	Tee Corinne, Intimacies; David Leddick, Male Nude Now; Susan Stryker, Queer Pulp; Robert Mainardi, Strongman: Vintage Photos of a Masculine Icon
Romance	Sylvia Brownrigg, Pages for You	William Jack Sibley, Any Kind of Luck; Marianne K. Martin, Mirrors; Karin Kallmaker, Substitute for Love; Vincent Virga, Vadriel Vail
Science fiction, fantasy or horror	Melissa Scott and Lisa A. Barnett, Point of Dreams	Nicola Griffith and Stephen Pagel, Bending the Landscape: Horror; David Thomas Lord, Bound in Blood; Keith Hartman, Gumshoe Gorilla; Michael Schiefelbein, Vampire Vow
Small press	Mariana Romo-Carmona, Conversaciones!	Andy Quan, Calendar Boy; Michael G. Cornelius, Creating Man; Robert N. Minor, Scared Straight: Why It's So Hard to Accept Gay People and Why It's So Hard to Be Human; Patricia Nell Warren, The Wild Man
Spirituality	Ken Stone, ed., Queer Commentary and the Hebrew Bible; Bernard Mayes, Escaping God's Closet: The Revelations of a Queer Priest	Leanne McCall Tigert and Timothy Brown, Coming Out Young and Faithful; Vanessa Sheridan, Crossing Over: Liberating the Transgendered Christian; L. William Countryman and M. R. Ritley, Gifted by Otherness
Transgender or Bisexual	Virginia Ramey Mollenkott, Omnigender: A Trans-religious Approach	Bill Brent and Carol Queen, Best Bisexual Erotica, Volume 2; Vanessa Sheridan, Crossing Over: Liberating the Transgendered Christian; Jonathan Branton, Dragged!! To His Senses; Sparrow L. Patterson, Synthetic Bi Products
