= Lambda Literary Award for Speculative Fiction =

American literary award

Lambda Literary Awards (also known as the "Lammys") are awarded yearly by the United States–based Lambda Literary Foundation to published works that celebrate or explore LGBTQ (lesbian, gay, bisexual, transgender, queer) themes. The awards are presented annually for books published in the previous year. The Lambda Literary Foundation states that its mission is "to celebrate LGBT literature and provide resources for writers, readers, booksellers, publishers, and librarians—the whole literary community."

Since their inception in 1989, awards have been given in various categories in fiction and non-fiction. The title for this category has changed several times, most recently to "LGBTQ+ Speculative Fiction".

== Eligibility guidelines ==
To be eligible for the award, a book must meet the following requirements:

- The book must have been published for the first time in the United States between January 1 and December 31 of the previous calendar year.
- The book must be published in English; translations are accepted.
- The book must be available for purchase in a bound or collected format. Self-published books are eligible, provided they exist in a single published file; books published exclusively on social or subscription-based sites (including blogs, personal newsletters, Wattpad, and Patreon) are not eligible.

This category includes science fiction, fantasy, horror and related genres; submissions can be in the form of novels, novellas, or short story collections.

As with other Lambda Literary Awards, the books nominated for the Lambda Literary Award for Science Fiction, Fantasy and Horror are selected based on several factors, including LGBTQ+ content, quality of writing and artistic merit.

== Winners and nominees ==
The Lambda Literary Award Medal Design 2008

In the following table, the years correspond to the year of the book's release. The ceremonies are always held the following year. Entries with a yellow background have won the relevant award, while those with a white background are the nominees. Categories are abbreviated; the official category titles are presented in the key.

=== Key ===
Official category title	Abbreviation	Award years
Gay Men's Mystery/Science Fiction	Gay M/SF	1989
Lesbian Mystery/Science Fiction	Lesb. M/SF	1989
Gay Men's Science Fiction/Fantasy	Gay SF/F	1991–1993
Lesbian Science Fiction/Fantasy	Lesb. SF/F	1990–1993
Science Fiction/Fantasy	SF/F	1994–2000
Horror/Science Fiction/Fantasy	SF/F/H	2001
Science Fiction/Fantasy/Horror	SF/F/H	2002–2006
LGBT Sci-Fi/Fantasy/Horror	LGBT SF/F/H	2007–2021
LGBTQ Speculative Fiction		2022–present

=== Recipients ===
Multi-time winners of the award include Melissa Scott (4), Nicola Griffith (3), Jim Grimsley (2), and Stephen Pagel (2). Nicola Griffith holds the record for most nominations (6), and Perry Brass has the most nominations without winning (4).

Lambda Literary Award for Science Fiction, Fantasy and Horror winners and finalists
Year	Category	Author	Title	Publisher	Result	Ref.
1989	Gay M/SF	Michael Nava	Goldenboy	Alyson	Winner	^{[A]}
1989	Gay M/SF	Donald Ward	Death Takes the Stage	St. Martin's Press	Finalist	
1989	Gay M/SF	Joseph Hansen	Obedience	Mysterious Press	Finalist	
1989	Gay M/SF	Michael Bishop	Unicorn Mountain	William Morrow and Co.	Finalist	
1989	Gay M/SF	George Baxt	Who Next	International Polygonics	Finalist	
1989	Lesb. M/SF	Antoinette Azolakov	Skiptrace	Banned Books	Winner	
1989	Lesb. M/SF	Dolores Klaich	Heavy Gilt	Naiad Press	Finalist	
1989	Lesb. M/SF	Claire McNab	Lessons in Murder	Naiad Press	Finalist	
1989	Lesb. M/SF	Judy Grahn	Mundane World	Crossing Press	Finalist	
1989	Lesb. M/SF	Sandy Bayer	The Crystal Curtain	Alyson	Finalist	
1990	Gay SF/F	Jeffrey N. McMahan	Somewhere in the Night	Alyson	Winner	^{[B]}
1990	Gay SF/F	Geoff Mains	Gentle Warriors	Knights Press	Finalist	
1990	Gay SF/F	William K. Eakins	Key West 2720 AD	Knights Press	Finalist	
1990	Gay SF/F	Mercedes Lackey	Magic's Pawn	DAW Books	Finalist	
1990	Gay SF/F	Thom Nickels	Walking Water / After All This	Banned Books	Finalist	
1990	Lesb. SF/F	Jessica Amanda Salmonson (ed.)	What Did Miss Darrington See?	Feminist Press	Winner	
1990	Lesb. SF/F	Nancy Tyler Glenn	Clicking Stones	Naiad Press	Finalist	
1990	Lesb. SF/F	Lauren Wright Douglas	In the Blood	Naiad Press	Finalist	
1990	Lesb. SF/F	Susanna J. Sturgis (ed.)	Memories and Visions	Crossing Press	Finalist	
1990	Lesb. SF/F	Lee Lynch	Sue Slate: Private Eye	Naiad Press	Finalist	
1991	Gay SF/F	Mercedes Lackey	Magic's Price	DAW Books	Winner	
1991	Gay SF/F	Toby Johnson	Secret Matter	Lavender	Winner	
1991	Gay SF/F	Marsh Cassady	Alternate Casts	Banned Books	Finalist	
1991	Gay SF/F	Storm Constantine	Enchantments of Flesh and Spirit	Tor Books	Finalist	
1991	Gay SF/F	Scott Edelman	The Gift	Space and Time	Finalist	
1991	Lesb. SF/F	Gael Baudino	Gossamer Axe	Roc	Winner	
1991	Lesb. SF/F	Patrick Califia	Doc and Fluff	Alyson	Finalist	
1991	Lesb. SF/F	Melissa Scott	Mighty Good Road	Baen Books	Finalist	
1991	Lesb. SF/F	Lynda Lyons	Priorities	Naiad Press	Finalist	
1991	Lesb. SF/F	Karen Marie Christa Minns	Virago	Naiad Press	Finalist	
1992	Gay SF/F	Frank M. Robinson	The Dark Beyond the Stars	Tor Books	Winner	
1992	Gay SF/F	Eric Garber (ed.)	Embracing the Dark	Alyson	Finalist	
1992	Gay SF/F	Perry Brass	Mirage	Belhue	Finalist	
1992	Gay SF/F	Jay B. Laws	Steam	Alyson	Finalist	
1992	Gay SF/F	Jeffrey N. McMahan	Vampires Anonymous	Alyson	Finalist	
1992	Lesb. SF/F	Jewelle Gomez	The Gilda Stories	Firebrand Books	Winner	^{[C]}
1992	Lesb. SF/F	B.L. Holmes	Mega	Mother Courage	Finalist	
1992	Lesb. SF/F	Chris Anne Wolfe	Shadows of Aggar	New Victoria	Finalist	
1992	Lesb. SF/F	Camarin Grae	Stranded	Naiad Press	Finalist	
1992	Lesb. SF/F	Judith Alguire	Zeta Base	Naiad Press	Finalist	
1993	Gay SF/F	Maureen F. McHugh	China Mountain Zhang	Tor Books	Winner	
1993	Gay SF/F	Thomas T. Thomas	Cry Gender	Baen Books	Finalist	
1993	Gay SF/F	Poppy Z. Brite	Lost Souls	Abyss / Delacorte	Finalist	
1993	Gay SF/F	Lewis Gannett	The Living One	Random House	Finalist	
1993	Gay SF/F	Anne Rice	The Tale of the Body Thief	Knopf	Finalist	
1993	Lesb. SF/F	Nicola Griffith	Ammonite	Del Rey Books	Winner	
1993	Lesb. SF/F	Melissa Scott	Dreamships	Tor Books	Finalist	
1993	Lesb. SF/F	Jean Stewart	Return to Isis	Rising Tide	Finalist	
1993	Lesb. SF/F	Judith Katz	Running Fiercely Toward a High Thin Sound	Firebrand Books	Finalist	^{[D]}
1993	Lesb. SF/F	Severna Park	Speaking Dreams	Firebrand Books	Finalist	
1994	SF/F	Starhawk	The Fifth Sacred Thing	Bantam Books	Winner	
1994	SF/F	Melissa Scott	Burning Bright	Tor Books	Finalist	
1994	SF/F	Poppy Brite	Drawing Blood	Delacorte Books	Finalist	
1994	SF/F	Sybil Claiborne	In the Garden of Dead Cars	Cleis Press	Finalist	
1994	SF/F	Jay B. Laws	The Unfinished	Alyson Books	Finalist	
1995	SF/F	Melissa Scott	Trouble and Her Friends	Tor Books	Winner	
1995	SF/F	Nancy Springer	Metal Angel	Roc	Finalist	
1995	SF/F	Mercedes Lackey	Storm Warning	DAW Books	Finalist	
1995	SF/F	Suzy McKee Charnas	The Furies	Tor Books	Finalist	
1995	SF/F	Jean Stewart	Warriors of Isis	DAW Books	Finalist	
1996	SF/F	Melissa Scott	Shadow Man	Tor Books	Winner (tie)	
1996	SF/F	Nicola Griffith	Slow River	Del Rey Books	Winner (tie)	
1996	SF/F	Samuel R. Delany	Atlantis: Three Tales	Wesleyan	Finalist	
1996	SF/F	Pam Keesey	Dark Angels	Cleis Press	Finalist	
1996	SF/F	Felice Picano	Dryland End	Richard Kasak	Finalist	
1997	SF/F	Clive Barker	Sacrament	HarperCollins	Winner	
1997	SF/F	Rachel Pollack	Godmother Night	St. Martin's Press	Finalist	
1997	SF/F	Michael Rowe and Thomas S. Roche (eds.)	Sons of Darkness	Cleis Press	Finalist	
1997	SF/F	Eric Garber and Jewelle Gomez (eds.)	Swords of the Rainbow	Alyson	Finalist	
1997	SF/F	Pam Keesey (eds.)	Women Who Run With Werewolves	Cleis Press	Finalist	
1998	SF/F	Nicola Griffith and Stephen Pagel (eds.)	Bending the Landscape: Fantasy	White Wolf	Winner	
1998	SF/F	William J. Mann	Grave Passions: Tales of the Gay Supernatural	Masquerade	Finalist	
1998	SF/F	Harry M. Benshoff (ed.)	Monsters in the Closet	Manchester University Press	Finalist	^{[E]}
1998	SF/F	Lawrence Schimel (ed.)	The Drag Queen of Elfland	Circlet Press	Finalist	
1998	SF/F	Perry Brass	The Harvest	Belhue	Finalist	
1999	SF/F	Nicola Griffith and Stephen Pagel (eds.)	Bending the Landscape: Science Fiction	Overlook Press	Winner	
1999	SF/F	Ulysses G. Dietz	Desmond	Alyson	Finalist	
1999	SF/F	Elizabeth Brownrigg	Falling to Earth	Firebrand Books	Finalist	
1999	SF/F	Clive Barker	Galilee	HarperCollins	Finalist	
1999	SF/F	Lawrence Schimel (ed.)	Things Invisible to See	Ultra Violet	Finalist	
2000	SF/F	Richard Bowes	Minions of the Moon	Tor Books	Winner	
2000	SF/F	Victoria Brownworth and Judith Redding (eds.)	Night Shade: Gothic Tales by Women	Seal Press	Finalist	
2000	SF/F	Severna Park	The Annunciate	Avon	Finalist	
2000	SF/F	Keith Hartman	The Gumshoe, the Witch, and the Virtual Corpse	Meisha Merlin	Finalist	^{[F]}
2000	SF/F	Delia Sherman	Through a Brazen Mirror	Circlet Press / Ace	Finalist	
2001	SF/F/H	Jim Grimsley	Kirith Kirin	Meisha Merlin	Winner	
2001	SF/F/H	Perry Brass	Angel Lust	Belhue	Finalist	
2001	SF/F/H	David Gerrold	Jumping off the Planet	Tor Books	Finalist	
2001	SF/F/H	Anne Rice	Merrick	Knopf	Finalist	
2001	SF/F/H	Michael Rowe (ed.)	Queer Fear	Arsenal Pulp Press	Finalist	^{[G]}
2002	SF/F/H	Melissa Scott and Lisa A. Barnett	Point of Dreams	Tor Books	Winner	
2002	SF/F/H	Nicola Griffith and Stephen Pagel (eds.)	Bending the Landscape: Horror	Overlook Press	Finalist	
2002	SF/F/H	David Thomas Lord	Bound in Blood	Kensington	Finalist	
2002	SF/F/H	Keith Hartman	Gumshoe Gorilla	Meisha Merlin	Finalist	
2002	SF/F/H	Michael Schiefelbein	Vampire Vow	Alyson	Finalist	
2003	SF/F/H	Michael Rowe (ed.)	Queer Fear II	Arsenal Pulp	Winner	^{[H]}
2003	SF/F/H	Katherine V. Forrest	Daughters of an Amber Noon	Overlook Press	Finalist	
2003	SF/F/H	Karin Kallmaker (as Laura Adams)	Seeds of Fire	Bella Books	Finalist	
2003	SF/F/H	Randy Boyd	The Devil Inside	West Beach	Finalist	
2003	SF/F/H	Cecilia Tan (ed.)	Wired Hard 3	Circlet Press	Finalist	
2004	SF/F/H	Helen Sandler (ed.)	Necrologue	Diva	Winner	
2004	SF/F/H	David M. Pierce	Elf Child	Southern Tier	Finalist	
2004	SF/F/H	Diana Rivers	The Red Line of Yarmald	Bella Books	Finalist	
2004	SF/F/H	Perry Brass	The Substance of God	Belhue	Finalist	
2004	SF/F/H	Michael Schiefelbein	Vampire Thrall	Alyson	Finalist	
2005	SF/F/H	Jim Grimsley	The Ordinary	Tor Books	Winner	
2005	SF/F/H	Michael Jensen	Firelands	Alyson	Finalist	
2005	SF/F/H	Greg Herren (ed.)	Shadows of the Night: Queer Tales of the Uncanny and Unusual	Southern Tier	Finalist	
2005	SF/F/H	Jean Stewart	The Wizard of Isis	Bella Books	Finalist	
2005	SF/F/H	Nicola Griffith	With Her Body	Aqueduct Press	Finalist	
2006	LGBT SF/F/H	Katherine V. Forrest	Daughters of an Emerald Dusk	Alyson	Winner	
2006	LGBT SF/F/H	Octavia Butler	Fledgling	Seven Stories Press	Finalist	
2006	LGBT SF/F/H	Jeanne Gӆellers	No Sister of Mine	Bella Books	Finalist	
2006	LGBT SF/F/H	David B. Coe	Shapers of Darkness	Tor Books	Finalist	
2006	LGBT SF/F/H	Jane Fletcher	Temple Landfall	Bold Strokes Books	Finalist	
2007	LGBT SF/F/H	Neal Drinnan	Izzy and Eve	Green Candy Press	Winner	^{[I]}
2007	LGBT SF/F/H	R.W. Day	A Strong and Sudden Thaw	Iris Print	Finalist	
2007	LGBT SF/F/H	Elizabeth Bear	Carnival	Bantam Spectra	Finalist	
2007	LGBT SF/F/H	Douglas Clegg	Mordred, Bastard Son	Alyson	Finalist	
2007	LGBT SF/F/H	Chris Moriarty	Spin Control	Bantam Spectra	Finalist	
2008	LGBT SF/F/H	Lee Thomas	The Dust of Wonderland	Alyson	Winner	
2008	LGBT SF/F/H	Elizabeth Bear and Sarah Monette	A Companion to Wolves	Tor Books	Finalist	
2008	LGBT SF/F/H	Jo Walton	Ha'penny	Tor Books	Finalist	
2008	LGBT SF/F/H	Brian Francis Slattery	Spaceman Blues	Tor Books	Finalist	
2008	LGBT SF/F/H	Ginn Hale	Wicked Gentlemen	Blind Eye Books	Finalist	
2009	LGBT SF/F/H	Nicole Kimberling	Turnskin	Blind Eye Books	Winner	
2009	LGBT SF/F/H	Craig Laurance Gidney	Sea, Swallow Me and Other Stories	Lethe Press	Finalist	
2009	LGBT SF/F/H	Astrid Amara	The Archer's Heart	Blind Eye Books	Finalist	
2009	LGBT SF/F/H	Barth Anderson	The Magician and the Fool	Bantam / Del Ray	Finalist	
2009	LGBT SF/F/H	Steve Berman	Wilde Stories 2008	Lethe Press	Finalist	
2010	LGBT SF/F/H	Catherynne M. Valente	Palimpsest	Bantam Books	Winner	
2010	LGBT SF/F/H	Rebecca Ore	Centuries Ago and Very Fast	Aqueduct Press	Finalist	
2010	LGBT SF/F/H	Amber Dawn	Fist of the Spider Woman	Arsenal Pulp Press	Finalist	
2010	LGBT SF/F/H	Lee Thomas	In the Closet, Under the Bed	Dark Scribe Press	Finalist	
2010	LGBT SF/F/H	Tom Cardamone	Pumpkin Teeth	Lethe Press	Finalist	
2011	LGBT SF/F/H	Sandra McDonald	Diana Comet and Other Improbable Stories	Lethe Press	Winner	
2011	LGBT SF/F/H	Tanith Lee	Disturbed by Her Song	Lethe Press	Finalist	
2011	LGBT SF/F/H	Nene Adams	Flowers of Edo	Black Car Publishing	Finalist	
2011	LGBT SF/F/H	Steve Berman (ed.)	Wilde Stories 2010	Lethe Press	Finalist	
2011	LGBT SF/F/H	Jane Fletcher	Wolfsbane Winter	Bold Strokes Books	Finalist	
2012	LGBT SF/F/H	Lee Thomas	The German	Lethe Press	Winner	
2012	LGBT SF/F/H	Geoff Ryman	Paradise Tales: and Other Stories	Small Beer Press	Finalist	
2012	LGBT SF/F/H	L.A. Witt	Static	Amber Allure / Amber Quill Press	Finalist	
2012	LGBT SF/F/H	JoSelle Vanderhooft	Steam-powered: Lesbian Steampunk Stories	Torquere Press	Finalist	
2012	LGBT SF/F/H	J. M. Frey	Triptych	Dragon Moon Press	Finalist	
2013	LGBT SF/F/H	Tom Cardamone	Green Thumb	Lethe Press	Winner	
2013	LGBT SF/F/H	Lee Mandelo	Beyond Binary: Genderqueer and Sexually Fluid Speculative Fiction	Lethe Press	Finalist	
2013	LGBT SF/F/H	H.B. Kurtzwilde	Chocolatiers of the High Winds: A Gay Steampunk Romance	Circlet Press	Finalist	
2013	LGBT SF/F/H	Connie Wilkins and Steve Berman	Heiresses of Russ 2012: the Year's Best Lesbian Speculative Fiction	Lethe Press	Finalist	
2013	LGBT SF/F/H	Kelly Sinclair	In the Now	Blue Feather Books	Finalist	
2013	LGBT SF/F/H	Greg Herren and J. M. Redmann	Night Shadows: Queer Horror	Bold Strokes Books	Finalist	
2013	LGBT SF/F/H	Sean Eads	The Survivors	Lethe Press	Finalist	
2014	LGBT SF/F/H	Melissa Scott and Amy Griswold	Death by Silver		Winner	
2014	LGBT SF/F/H	Deborah Wheeler	Collaborators		Finalist	
2014	LGBT SF/F/H	Alex Jeffers	Deprivation; or, Benedetto furioso: an oneiromancy		Finalist	
2014	LGBT SF/F/H	Isabella Carter	Dragon Slayer		Finalist	
2014	LGBT SF/F/H	Richard Bowes	Dust Devil on a Quiet Street		Finalist	
2014	LGBT SF/F/H	Marie Castle	Hell's Belle		Finalist	
2014	LGBT SF/F/H	Roberta Degnore	Invisible Soft Return		Finalist	
2014	LGBT SF/F/H	Nathan Burgoine	Light		Finalist	
2014	LGBT SF/F/H	Lee Thomas	Like Light for Flies		Finalist	
2014	LGBT SF/F/H	Mary Anne Mohanraj	The Stars Change		Finalist	
2015	LGBT SF/F/H	Chaz Brenchley	Bitter Waters		Winner	
2015	LGBT SF/F/H	Daryl Gregory	Afterparty		Finalist	
2015	LGBT SF/F/H	Lee Thomas	Butcher's Road		Finalist	
2015	LGBT SF/F/H	A. M. Dellamonica	Child of a Hidden Sea		Finalist	
2015	LGBT SF/F/H	Max Gladstone	Full Fathom Five		Finalist	
2015	LGBT SF/F/H	Lea Daley	FutureDyke		Finalist	
2015	LGBT SF/F/H	Craig Laurance Gidney	Skin Deep Magic		Finalist	
2016	LGBT SF/F/H	Kirsty Logan	The Gracekeepers		Winner	
2016	LGBT SF/F/H	Ally Blue	Down		Finalist	
2016	LGBT SF/F/H	J.A. Rock	Minotaur		Finalist	
2016	LGBT SF/F/H	Kate Sherwood	Sacrati		Finalist	
2016	LGBT SF/F/H	John Inman	The Boys on the Mountain		Finalist	
2016	LGBT SF/F/H	Fletcher DeLancey	The Caphenon		Finalist	
2016	LGBT SF/F/H	Robert Levy	The Glittering World		Finalist	
2016	LGBT SF/F/H	Jude McLaughlin	Wonder City Stories		Finalist	
2017	LGBT SF/F/H	Indra Das	The Devourers		Winner	
2017	LGBT SF/F/H	Sassafras Lowrey	A Little Queermas Carol		Finalist	
2017	LGBT SF/F/H	Dayna Ingram	All Good Children		Finalist	
2017	LGBT SF/F/H	David Lennon	Irish Black		Finalist	
2017	LGBT SF/F/H	A. C. Wise	Kissing Booth Girl		Finalist	
2017	LGBT SF/F/H	Michael Thomas Ford	Lily		Finalist	
2017	LGBT SF/F/H	Ras Mashramani, Rasheedah Phillips, Alex Smith, and M. Eighteen Téllez	Style of Attack Report		Finalist	
2017	LGBT SF/F/H	Andrea Hairston	Will Do Magic for Small Change		Finalist	
2018	LGBT SF/F/H	Annalee Newitz	Autonomous		Winner	
2018	LGBT SF/F/H	Lara Elena Donnelly	Amberlough		Finalist	
2018	LGBT SF/F/H	Maggie Shen King	An Excess Male		Finalist	
2018	LGBT SF/F/H	Rivers Solomon	An Unkindness of Ghosts		Finalist	
2018	LGBT SF/F/H	Kristen Ringman	I Stole You		Finalist	
2018	LGBT SF/F/H	Owen Keehnen	Night Visitors		Finalist	
2018	LGBT SF/F/H	Lindsey Drager	The Lost Daughter Collective		Finalist	
2018	LGBT SF/F/H	Nicky Drayden	The Prey of Gods		Finalist	
2019	LGBT SF/F/H	Isaac R. Fellman	The Breath of the Sun	Aqueduct Press	Winner	
2019	LGBT SF/F/H	Sonya Taaffe	Forget the Sleepless Shores	Lethe Press	Finalist	
2019	LGBT SF/F/H	Aliette de Bodard	In the Vanishers' Palace	JABberwocky	Finalist	
2019	LGBT SF/F/H	Clay AD	Metabolize, If Able	Monster House Press	Finalist	
2019	LGBT SF/F/H	Fletcher DeLancey	Resilience	Heartsome Publishing	Finalist	
2019	LGBT SF/F/H	Margaret Killjoy	The Barrow Will Send What It May	Tor Books	Finalist	
2019	LGBT SF/F/H	Neon Yang	The Descent of Monsters	Tor Books	Finalist	
2019	LGBT SF/F/H	C. L. Polk	Witchmark	Tor Books	Finalist	
2020	LGBT SF/F/H	Rivers Solomon, Daveed Diggs, William Hutson, and Jonathan Snipes	The Deep	Saga Press / Gallery	Winner	
2020	LGBT SF/F/H	Craig Laurance Gidney	A Spectral Hue	Word Horde	Finalist	
2020	LGBT SF/F/H	Marlon James	Black Leopard, Red Wolf	Riverhead Books	Finalist	
2020	LGBT SF/F/H	Jac Jemc	False Bingo	Dzanc Books	Finalist	
2020	LGBT SF/F/H	Matthew Bright	Stories to Sing in the Dark	Lethe Press	Finalist	
2020	LGBT SF/F/H	Samantha Shannon	The Priory of the Orange Tree	Bloomsbury Publishing	Finalist	
2020	LGBT SF/F/H	Julie C. Day	The Rampant	Aqueduct Press	Finalist	
2020	LGBT SF/F/H	Nina MacLaughlin	Wake, Siren	Farrar, Straus and Giroux	Finalist	
2021	LGBT SF/F/H	Julian K. Jarboe	Everyone on the Moon is Essential Personnel	Lethe Press	Winner	
2021	LGBT SF/F/H	Rebecca Roanhorse	Black Sun	Saga Press / Gallery	Finalist	
2021	LGBT SF/F/H	Zen Cho	The Order of the Pure Moon Reflected in Water	Tor Books	Finalist	
2021	LGBT SF/F/H	Tlotlo Tsamaase	The Silence of the Wilting Skin	Pink Narcissus Press	Finalist	
2021	LGBT SF/F/H	Aaron A. Reed	Subcutanean	Self-published	Finalist	
2022	LGBTQ Speculative Fiction	Cadwell Turnbull	No Gods, No Monsters	Blackstone Publishing	Winner	
2022	LGBTQ Speculative Fiction	Arkady Martine	A Desolation Called Peace	Tor Books	Finalist	
2022	LGBTQ Speculative Fiction	Honni van Rijswijk	Breeder	Blackstone Publishing	Finalist	
2022	LGBTQ Speculative Fiction	Olivia Tapiero with Kit Schluter (trans.)	Phototaxis	Nightboat Books	Finalist	
2022	LGBTQ Speculative Fiction	Neon Yang	The Tensorate Series	Tor Books	Finalist	
2023	LGBTQ Speculative Fiction	Lianyu Tan	The Wicked and the Willing	Shattered Scepter Press	Winner	
2023	LGBTQ Speculative Fiction	Sunyi Dean	The Book Eaters	Tor Books	Finalist	
2023	LGBTQ Speculative Fiction	Nghi Vo	Into the Riverlands	Tor.com	Finalist	
2023	LGBTQ Speculative Fiction	Khan Wong	The Circus Infinite	Angry Robot	Finalist	
2023	LGBTQ Speculative Fiction	Rob Hart	The Paradox Hotel	Ballantine Books	Finalist	
2024	LGBTQ Speculative Fiction	Marisa Crane	I Keep My Exoskeletons to Myself	Catapult	Winner	
2024	LGBTQ Speculative Fiction	Aubrey Wood	Bang Bang Bodhisattva	Solaris	Finalist	
2024	LGBTQ Speculative Fiction	Emma Mieko Candon	The Archive Undying	Tor.com	Finalist	
2024	LGBTQ Speculative Fiction	Vajra Chandrasekera	The Saint of Bright Doors	Tor.com	Finalist	
2024	LGBTQ Speculative Fiction	Chana Porter	The Thick and the Lean	Saga Press	Finalist	
2025	LGBTQ Speculative Fiction	August Clarke	Metal From Heaven	Erewhon Books	Winner	
2025	LGBTQ Speculative Fiction	Chuck Tingle	Bury Your Gays	Tor Publishing Group	Finalist	
2025	LGBTQ Speculative Fiction	C. G. Malburi	Markless	Levine Querido	Finalist	
2025	LGBTQ Speculative Fiction	Sascha Stronach	The Sunforge	Saga Press | Simon and Schuster	Finalist	
2025	LGBTQ Speculative Fiction	Caro De Robertis	The Palace of Eros	Simon and Schuster	Finalist	
2026	LGBTQ Speculative Fiction	Ilana Masad	Beings	Bloomsbury Publishing	Winner	
2026	LGBTQ Speculative Fiction	Johanna van Veen	Blood on Her Tongue	Sourcebooks, Poisoned Pen Press	Finalist	
2026	LGBTQ Speculative Fiction	Elaine Ho	Cry, Voidbringer	Left Unread	Finalist	
2026	LGBTQ Speculative Fiction	Cory O'Brien	Two Truths and a Lie	Pantheon Books	Finalist	
2026	LGBTQ Speculative Fiction	Seth Haddon	Volatile Memory	Tordotcom	Finalist	

== Notes ==
^{A} Also jointly won Gay Men's Small Press Book Award.
^{B} Also nominated for Gay Men's Mystery.
^{C} Also jointly won Lesbian Fiction.
^{D} Also won Lesbian Fiction.
^{E} Also nominated for Drama.
^{F} Also nominated for Gay Men's Mystery.
^{G} Also nominated for Gay Men's Anthology-Fiction.
^{H} Also nominated for Gay Men's Anthology-Fiction.
^{I} Also nominated for Gay Fiction.

== See also ==
- Gaylactic Spectrum Awards
- LGBTQ themes in speculative fiction
- Sex and sexuality in speculative fiction
