= 16th Lambda Literary Awards =

2004 literary awards ceremony

The 16th Lambda Literary Awards were held in 2004 to honour works of LGBT literature published in 2003.

== Special awards ==
Category	Winner
Pioneer Award	Samuel R. Delany, Blanche Wiesen Cook

== Nominees and winners ==
Category	Winner	Nominated
Anthologies/Fiction	Michael Bronski, ed., Pulp Friction: Uncovering the Golden Age of Gay Male Pulps	Jon Jeffrey, Chris Kenry, William J. Mann and Ben Tyler, All I Want for Christmas; Angela Brown, Best Lesbian Love Stories 2003; Karl Woelz, M2M; Lydia Hall, Telling Moments
Anthologies/Non-Fiction	Bob Guter and John Killacky, eds., Queer Crips: Disabled Gay Men and Their Stories	Kevin Bentley, Boyfriends from Hell; Robert Klitzman and Ronald Bayer, Mortal Secrets: Truth and Lies in the Age of AIDS; Greg Wharton, The Love that Dare Not Speak Its Name; Toni Amato and Mary Davies, Pinned Down by Pronouns
Autobiography/Memoir	Lillian Faderman, Naked in the Promised Land	Robert Tewdwr Moss, Cleopatra’s Wedding Present; Billy Bean, Going the Other Way; Marijane Meaker, Highsmith: A Romance; Jennifer Finney Boylan, She’s Not There
Biography	Andrew Wilson, Beautiful Shadow: A Life of Patricia Highsmith	Lois W. Banner, Intertwined Lives; John D'Emilio, Lost Prophet; Keith Fleming, Original Youth; Robert Schanke, That Furious Lesbian
Children's/Young Adult	David Levithan, Boy Meets Boy	Brent Hartinger, Geography Club; Tea Benduhn, Gravel Queen; Julie Anne Peters, Keeping You a Secret; Alex Sánchez, Rainbow High
Drama	Brian Drader, Prok	Ben Hodges, Forbidden Acts; C. E. Gatchalian, Motifs & Repetitions & Other Plays; Mart Crowley, The Band Plays; Robert Schanke, Women in Turmoil: Six Plays
Erotica	Tristan Taormino, ed., Best Lesbian Erotica 2004	Richard Labonté, Best Gay Erotica 2004; Aren X. Tulchinsky, Hot and Bothered 4; Michael Thomas Ford, William J. Mann, Sean Wolfe and Jeff Mann, Masters of Midnight; James Johnstone, Quickies 3
Gay Fiction	Christopher Bram, Lives of the Circus Animals	Philip Gambone, Beijing; Monique Truong, The Book of Salt; Paul Russell, War Against the Animals; William J. Mann, Where the Boys Are
Gay Mystery	John Morgan Wilson, Blind Eye	Greg Herren, Bourbon Street Blues; Mark Richard Zubro, Dead Egotistical Morons; Elliott Mackle, It Takes Two; David Stukas, Wearing Black to the White Party
Gay Poetry	Mark Bibbins, Sky Lounge	Henri Cole, Middle Earth; Reginald Shepherd, Otherhood: Poems; Peter Pereira, Saying the World; Rafael Campo, The Healing Art
Humor	Alison Bechdel, Dykes and Sundry Other Carbon-Based Life-Forms to Watch Out For	Glen Hanson and Allan Neuwirth, Chelsea Boys; Michael Alvear, Men are Pigs, But We Love Bacon; Michael Thomas Ford, My Big Fat Queer Life; Joel Perry, That’s Why They’re in Cages, People!
Lesbian Fiction	Nina Revoyr, Southland	Susan J. Leonardi, And Then They Were Nuns; Ann-Marie MacDonald, The Way the Crow Flies; Lucy Jane Bledsoe, This Wild Silence; Carla Trujillo, What Night Brings
Lesbian Mystery	Elizabeth Sims, Damn Straight	Baxter Clare, Cry Havoc; Lauren Maddison, Epitaph for an Angel; Ida Swearingen, Owl of the Desert; Bett Reece Johnson, The Woman Who Found Grace
Lesbian Poetry	Minnie Bruce Pratt, The Dirt She Ate	Terry Wolverton, Embers; Daphne Gottlieb, Final Girl; Susan McCabe, Swirl; Michelle Tea, The Beautiful
LGBT Studies	Devon Carbado and Donald Weise, eds.. Time on Two Crosses	Wayne Besen, Anything But Straight; Michael Mancilla and Lisa Troshinsky, Love in the Time of HIV; James McCourt, Queer Street; Mack Friedman, Strapped for Cash
Photography/Visual Arts	Lonthar Schirmer, ed., Women Seeing Women	John Peterson and Martin Bedogne, A Face in the Crowd: Expressions of Gay Life in America; Laurie Toby Edison, Familiar Men; Roslyn Banish, Focus on Living; Lawrence Schimel and Sebas, Vacation in Ibiza
Romance	Karin Kallmaker, Maybe Next Time; Michael Thomas Ford, Last Summer	Angela Brown, Best Lesbian Love Stories 2003; Dave Benbow, Daytime Drama; Michelle Sawyer, They Say She Tastes Like Honey
Science fiction, fantasy or horror	Helen Sandler, ed., Necrologue	David M. Pierce, Elf Child; Diana Rivers, The Red Line of Yarmald; Perry Brass, The Substance of God; Michael Schiefelbein, Vampire Thrall
Spirituality	Fenton Johnson, Keeping Faith	Wayne Besen, Anything But Straight; Toby Johnson, Gay Perspective; Christopher Penczak, Gay Witchcraft; Theodore W. Jennings, The Man Jesus Loved
Transgender	Jennifer Finney Boylan, She's Not There	Donna Troka, Kathleen Lebesco and Jean Noble, The Drag King Anthology; Justin Tanis, Trans-gendered; Virginia Ramey Mollenkott and Vanessa Sheridan, Transgender Journeys
