= Rob Byrnes =

American novelist

- Born: Robert Charles Byrnes Jr. December 8, 1958 (age 67); Rochester, New York, U.S.
- Education: Union College
- Occupation: Author
- Partner: Brady Allen
- Writing career
- Genres: Gay Comic Mystery and Romance
- Website: www.robbyrnes.net

Robert Charles "Rob" Byrnes Jr. (born December 8, 1958) is a 21st-century gay American, novelist and blogger, whose fiction focuses primarily on gay men and other sexual minorities. He serves on the Steering Committee for The Publishing Triangle, and was also a member of the Executive Council of the International Association of Crime Writers/North American Branch from 2011 to 2015.

== Early life and education ==
Byrnes was born on December 8, 1958, in Rochester, New York. After graduating from Union College (Schenectady, New York) he worked in politics and government. While working as Chief of Staff to two Members of the New York State Assembly, he ran as a minor-party candidate for Monroe County (NY) Legislature in 1981 and the United States Congress in 1986. In 1996, he moved to Manhattan, and has worked as an executive in the not-for-profit business development field since then.

== Work ==
Byrnes's first three novels were gay comic romances. His acclaimed debut, The Night We Met, was released in 2002. His second novel, Trust Fund Boys was released in 2004 and his third, the Lambda Literary Award-winning When The Stars Come Out, in 2006.

Beginning with his 2009 novel Straight Lies, Byrnes began a series of comic crime capers featuring a hapless gang of gay and lesbian criminals led by partners in life and crime Grant Lambert and Chase LaMarca. The second novel in the series, Holy Rollers, was released by Bold Strokes Books in November 2011; and the third, Strange Bedfellows (not to be confused with the 2000 anthology), which was published by Bold Strokes in September 2012.

Byrnes has also published short stories in Best Gay Romance 2014; Men of the Mean Streets (2011), a collection of gay noir short stories edited by Greg Herren and J. M. Redmann; Saints & Sinners 2010: New Fiction from the Festival, edited by Amie M. Evans and Paul J. Willis; Fool for Love (2009), a gay romance anthology, edited by Timothy J. Lambert and R. D. Cochrane; and Strange Bedfellows (2000), a book of erotic political fiction, edited by Dominic Santi and Debra Hyde (not to be confused with the 2012 novel.)

== Awards and honors ==
His 2006 novel When the Stars Come Out won the Lambda Literary Foundation's award for Best Gay Romance, and Straight Lies, published in 2009, was a Lambda Award finalist in the Best Gay Mystery category.

== Personal ==
Byrnes's writing is often set in New York City. He lives in West New York, New Jersey, with his partner Brady Allen.

== Bibliography ==
- Strange Bedfellows (2000), (ISBN 073883890X / 978-0738838908) -- Political erotica. Byrnes's "Media Relations" is a humorous short story about an encounter between a gay Washington Post reporter and a conservative presidential candidate.
- The Night We Met (2002), (ISBN 0758201931) -- Gay comic romance. Andrew Westlake, a struggling writer, falls in love with the closeted son of a Mafia boss, Frank DiBenedetto. As their lives spin out of control, Andrew and Frank try to dodge cops, hit men, Andrew's writing arch-rival, Frank's vindictive fiancée, and an attractive FBI agent, as they struggle to save their relationship and their lives.
- Trust Fund Boys (2004), (ISBN 0758205449) -- Gay comic romance. Failed actor Brett Revere tries to take a short-cut up the ladder to success by pretending to be wealthy and fitting in with a gay moneyed crowd, but falls in love with Jamie Brock, a charming conman who is playing the same game. As his adventure unfolds, Brett discovers a lot about himself and the price he is paying for hiding his identity.
- When The Stars Come Out (2006), (ISBN 0758213247) -- Gay comic romance. When Hollywood heartthrob Quinn Scott realized he was gay in the late 1960s, his wife—the girl-next-door actress Kitty Randolph—exiled him and wrote him out of her life. Almost forty years later, Quinn's about to write his autobiography (with the assistance of the cute yet arrogant Noah Abraham), and Kitty is now a major entertainment mogul. This novel examines the effects of the "closet" on numerous levels, from the biggest celebrities to the person-next-door.
- Fool for Love (2009), (ISBN 1573443395) -- Gay romance anthology. In Byrnes's story, "Happy Hour at Cafe Jones," a man awaiting his blind date encounters his ex-lover. This anthology also features contributions from Andrew Holleran, Felice Picano, Greg Herren, Joel Derfner, and other major gay writers, as well as a number of new voices.
- Straight Lies (2009), (ISBN 0758228570) -- Gay comic crime caper. The story of a pair of small-time gay criminals who learn about a sex tape proving that the world's hottest openly gay celebrity is actually heterosexual. What should be a simple plan—retrieve the tape, blackmail the celebrity, and live happily ever after—gets complicated when the tape is left in the back of a cab, setting in motion a madcap crime caper involving a misfit group of gay and lesbian thieves.
- Saints & Sinners 2010: New Fiction from the Festival (2010), (ISBN 1608640353) -- Gay and lesbian anthology. In "Saint Daniel and His Demons," Byrnes tells the story of a man eager to lose his too-good reputation. Contributors include Greg Herren, Jeff Mann, and Jewelle Gomez.
- Men of the Mean Streets (2011), (ISBN 1602822409) -- Gay noir anthology. Byrnes's dark short story "Patience, Colorado" was his first non-humorous work. Other writers in the anthology include Michael Thomas Ford, Jeffrey Ricker, and 'Nathan Burgoine.
- Holy Rollers (2011), (ISBN 1602825785) -- Gay comic crime caper. The inept gay and lesbian criminals introduced in Straight Lies return. This time, their target is $7 million in "petty cash" hidden in a mega-church located in Northern Virginia, and their adversaries include a powerful preacher, scheming congressmen, and an extremely aggressive Homeowner association.
- Strange Bedfellows (2012), (ISBN 160282746X) -- Gay comic crime caper. When a racy cellphone photo is used to blackmail a congressional candidate, his campaign manager hires the gang of gay and lesbian criminals to retrieve it.
- The Other Man: 21 Writers Speak Candidly About Sex, Love, Infidelity, & Moving On (2013), (ISBN 1483970965) -- Essay. Byrnes's essay in the anthology, "A Brief History of the Divorce Party," details the breakup of a long-term relationship.
- Best Gay Romance 2014 (2014), (ISBN 1627780114) -- Gay romance anthology. In "Carver Comes Home," a young man returns to his hometown to make amends for past lies.
