= Groundswell =

Groundswell may refer to:

- Swell (ocean), a type of ocean wave

== Music ==
- Groundswell (album), a 2003 album by Parts & Labor, or its title song
- Three Days Grace or Groundswell, a Canadian rock band
- Groundswell, a band created by Jonn Penney

== Other uses ==
- Ground Swell, a 1939 painting by Edward Hopper
- Groundswell (organization), a non-profit organization based in Washington, D.C.
- Groundswell (comics), a supervillain from DC Comics
- Groundswell (book), a 2008 book by Charlene Li and Josh Bernoff
- Groundswell: The Second Diva Book of Short Stories
- Groundswell group, a political action group
- Groundswell NZ, a farming advocacy and protest group in New Zealand
- Groundswell (film), a 2026 documentary
