= An Arrow's Flight =

1998 novel by Mark Merlis

- Author: Mark Merlis
- Language: English
- Publisher: St. Martin's Press
- Publication date: August 1998
- Publication place: United States
- Media type: Print (hardback & paperback)
- Pages: 376 pp
- ISBN: 978-0-312-18675-3
- OCLC: 38150357
- Dewey Decimal: 813/.54 21
- LC Class: PS3563.E7422 A89 1998

An Arrow's Flight is a 1998 novel by American author Mark Merlis.

== Plot summary ==
Pyrrhus lives in the city with his simple housemate Leucon. He works as a waiter at a dead-end restaurant, then soon finds himself working as a hustler. One day, he hears from Phoenix that his father Achilles has left him some inheritance in Troy after dying in battle, and he decides to claim it. On the ship, he sleeps with Corythus, a sailor. He soon learns he needs to seduce Philoctetes and get his bow for a prophecy to come true. He grows attached to the old man, though the latter also has an affair with Paris. Finally, Philoctetes breaks the bow. Pyrrhus meets Leucon again in a hospital where Pyrrhus is waiting to see his lover Philoctetes, who is very sick; the latter realizes he no longer has feelings for Pyrrhus. Pyrrhus understands that he has grown and accepted his sexuality and is able to live openly, something Leucon cannot do. (The novel hints that he probably never will.)

== Main characters ==
- Pyrrhus, the protagonist.
- Leucon
- Odysseus
- Philoctetes
- Corythus
- Paris

== Literary significance ==
- 1999 Lambda Literary Award for Gay Men's Fiction
- It is a retelling of Sophocles's Philoctetes. It was inspired by Edmund Wilson's essay entitled 'The Wound and the Bow'. It was also inspired by Christopher Logue and Robinson Jeffers.
- It has been read as a sequel to Andrew Holleran's Dancer from the Dance.
