= Robert Klitzman =

American psychiatrist and bioethicist (born 1958)

Robert Klitzman (born July 1, 1958) is an American psychiatrist and bioethicist.

== Biography ==
=== Early life ===
Robert Klitzman was born on July 1, 1958. He attended Princeton University, where he studied with Clifford Geertz. He then conducted field research on Kuru in Papua New Guinea.

He attended Yale Medical School, and completed his medical internship and psychiatric residency at the Payne Whitney Psychiatric Clinic and what is now the New York-Presbyterian Hospital/Weill Cornell Medical Center.

=== Career ===
Klitzman is currently a professor of Clinical Psychiatry at the College of Physicians and Surgeons and the Mailman School of Public Health at Columbia University. He co-founded and for five years co-directed the Columbia University Center for Bioethics, is the director of the Masters in Bioethics program, and the director of the Ethics and Policy Core of the HIV Center.

He has published nine books and authored or co-authored over 200 academic journal articles and numerous chapters on critical issues in bioethics including: genetics, stem cells, ethics of assisted reproductive technologies, neuroethics, HIV prevention, recreational drug use, research ethics, and doctor-patient relationships.

His research on the experiences of physicians when they become patients shed important light on ways of improving doctor-patient relationships.

He has been widely cited as an authority on ethical issues concerning genetic testing for Huntington's disease, breast cancer, genetic discrimination, medical privacy, epidemics of HIV and prion diseases such as Kuru, and bovine spongiform encephalopathy (or "Mad Cow" disease), death and dying, stem cell research, and spirituality and medicine.

His books include When Doctors Become Patients, A Year-Long Night: Tales of a Medical Internship, In a House of Dreams and Glass: Becoming a Psychiatrist, Being Positive: The Lives of Men and Women With HIV, The Trembling Mountain: A Personal Account of Kuru, Cannibals, and Mad Cow Disease, with Ronald Bayer, Mortal Secrets: Truth and Lies in the Age of AIDS, which was a finalist for a 2004 Lambda Literary Award, Am I My Genes?: Confronting Fate and Other Genetic Journeys, The Ethics Police?: The Struggle to Make Human Research Safe, and Designing Babies: How Technology is Changing the Ways We Create Children.

He has received fellowships from the Guggenheim Foundation, the Russell Sage Foundation, the Commonwealth Fund, the Aaron Diamond Foundation, and the Rockefeller Foundation, and served on the Department of Defense’s US Army Medical Research and Material Command Research Ethics Advisory Panel. He is a distinguished fellow of the American Psychiatric Association, a member of the Empire State Stem Cell Commission, HIV Prevention Trials Network, and the Council on Foreign Relations, and is a regular contributor to the New York Times and CNN.

== Bibliography ==
- A Year-Long Night: Tales of a Medical Internship (1989)
- In a House of Dreams and Glass: Becoming a Psychiatrist (1995)
- Being Positive: The Lives of Men and Women With HIV (1997)
- The Trembling Mountain: A Personal Account of Kuru, Cannibals, and Mad Cow Disease (1998)
- Mortal Secrets: Truth and Lies in the Age of AIDS (with Ronald Bayer, 2003)
- When Doctors Become Patients (2008)
- Am I My Genes? Confronting Fate and Family Secrets in the Age of Genetic Testing (2012)
- The Ethics Police?: The Struggle to Make Human Research Safe (2015)
- Designing Babies: How Technology is Changing the Ways We Create Children (2019)
- Doctor, Will You Pray for Me?: Medicine, Chaplains, and Healing the Whole Person (2024)
