= Warren Dunford =

Canadian writer (born 1963, died 2026)

- Born: 1963
- Died: 2026 (aged 62–63)
- Education: Ryerson University
- Occupations: novelist, advertising copywriter
- Writing career
- Language: English
- Period: 1990s-2000s
- Notable works: Soon to Be a Major Motion Picture, Making a Killing, The Scene Stealer

Warren Dunford (born 1963) is a Canadian writer, who published three comedic mystery novels in the 1990s and 2000s. All three novels centred on Mitchell Draper, a gay aspiring screenwriter and amateur detective plunged into unusual criminal investigations in the film industries of both Toronto and Hollywood.

A graduate of Ryerson University in radio and television arts, Dunford initially worked as an advertising copywriter and wrote an unproduced screenplay. His first short story, "Moment's Glory", was published in the Toronto Star in 1987.

His first novel, Soon to Be a Major Motion Picture, was published in 1998. The novel was rejected by 100 different publishing companies before being accepted by Riverbank Press.

His second novel, Making a Killing, followed in 2001 and garnered a Lambda Literary Award nomination in the Gay Mystery category at the 14th Lambda Literary Awards in 2002. His third novel, The Scene Stealer, followed in 2005.

He has also been a television writer for the series Canadian Case Files, and has published short stories in Taddle Creek, This Magazine, and the anthologies Upon a Midnight Clear, Quickies II and Queer Fear II.
