= Chronicles of Alsea =

Science fiction series by Fletcher DeLancey

The Chronicles of Alsea is a science fiction book series by Fletcher DeLancey, consisting of ten novels: The Caphenon (2015), Without a Front: The Producer's Challenge (2015), Without a Front: The Warrior's Challenge (2015), Catalyst (2016), Vellmar the Blade (2016), Outcaste (2017), Resilience (2018), Uprising (2019), Alsea Rising: Gathering Storm (2020), and Alsea Rising: The Seventh Star (2020). The series also includes two novellas: Projection (2015) and Far Enough (2020).

== Background ==
DeLancey has stated that the series "is an exploration of what happens when good people make bad decisions, when politicians have lofty ideals but must compromise to achieve them, and when love—as it so often does—both impairs and enables the course of history."

DeLancey has been praised for her well-crafted characters, which she says comes from three distinct approaches: "creative kaboom," where characters appear to her fully formed; "careful crafting," where she works through characters' backstories and motivations before writing; and "getting to know you," where she allows the character to develop as she writes them.

== Reviews ==
Alicia Kania, writing for POMEmag, reviewed the first six books of the series, writing, "Not to be dramatic, but reading this series felt like discovering something I'd spent my life waiting for." She applauded the books for being "ever so beautifully and boldly women-centric and romantic." Kania continued, stating,

Sometimes, when I review great sci-fi, I use phrases like “a breath of fresh air” and/or “dessert.” This series is both of those things and so much more. It's difficult to properly articulate how meaningful it is to me, personally, to find a fascinating sci-fi/fantasy adventure with women, women's love stories, and compassion at center stage. What's more, as an aspiring novelist, I not only learned a great deal from Chronicles of Alsea, but I came away inspired to be more fearless in my own storytelling. What a gift!.

DeLancey's writing style has been praised in multiple reviews, with one reviewer stating, "Her prose flows faultlessly." In a review for a separate book, this reviewer continued, stating, "I have been reading sci-fi now for over forty years, and there is no doubt in my mind that Fletcher DeLancey is among the finest authors in this genre."

Publishers Weekly applauded Without a Front: The Producer's Challenge, explaining, "DeLancey veers from a straightforward SF adventure of first-contact and galactic political maneuvering to deliver a more lighthearted romance, delighting readers with high-quality writing, confident female leaders, political machinations, and detailed world-building."

LOTL also praised the novel, writing, "Fletcher DeLancey works true magic here. Her words convey an utterly vivid picture of a fully developed empathic alien society, and explores the nooks and crannies of an established caste society. There are no information dumps, but the story masterfully offers those bits and pieces."

== Awards and honors ==
Awards and honors for the Chronicles of Alsea series
Year	Title	Award/Honor	Result	Ref.
2016	The Caphenon	Lambda Literary Award for Science Fiction, Fantasy and Horror	Finalist	
2016	Without a Front: The Producer's Challenge	Goldie Award for Science Fiction/ Fantasy	Finalist	
2016	Without a Front: The Warrior's Challenge	Goldie Award for Science Fiction/ Fantasy	Winner	
2017	The Caphenon	Independent Publisher Book Award for Best SciFi/Fantasy/Horror eBook	Bronze	
2017	Catalyst	Goldie Award for Science Fiction/ Fantasy	Finalist	
2017	Vellmar the Blade	SFR Galaxy Award for Best Mother-Daughter Dynamic	Winner	
2019	Resilience	Lambda Literary Award for Science Fiction, Fantasy and Horror	Finalist	
