= Fletcher DeLancey =

American science fiction writer

Fletcher DeLancey is an American science fiction writer, best known for her Chronicles of Alsea series, which has twice made her a finalist for the Lambda Literary Award for Science Fiction, Fantasy and Horror. Before focusing on her writing, DeLancey worked in a marine biology lab. Later, she began teaching pilates alongside her writing.

DeLancey grew up in Oregon. She was married to a man before coming out as a lesbian after meeting her now-wife in Portugal. DeLancey and Maria married in Canada before moving to the Algarve region of Portugal, where their marriage was recognized after same-sex marriage was legalized in the country. As of 2026, the couple live in Algarve with their son.

== Select writing ==
=== Chronicles of Alsea series ===
The Chronicles of Alsea series is a science fiction book series consisting of ten novels: The Caphenon (2015), Without a Front: The Producer's Challenge (2015), Without a Front: The Warrior's Challenge (2015), Catalyst (2016), Vellmar the Blade (2016), Outcaste (2017), Resilience (2018), Uprising (2019), Alsea Rising: Gathering Storm (2020), and Alsea Rising: The Seventh Star (2020). The series also includes two novellas: Projection (2015) and Far Enough (2020).

Books in the series have been generally well received by critics and have earned DeLancey multiple literary awards.The Caphenon was a finalist for the 2016 Lambda Literary Award for Science Fiction, Fantasy and Horror, and received a bronze medal for the 2017 Independent Publisher Book Award for Best SciFi/Fantasy/Horror eBook. Also in 2016, Without a Front: The Producer's Challenge was a finalist for the Goldie Award for Science Fiction/ Fantasy, which was won by DeLancey's Without a Front: The Warrior's Challenge. The following year, Catalyst was a finalist for the same award, and Vellmar the Blade won the SFR Galaxy Award for Best Mother-Daughter Dynamic. In 2019, Resilience was a finalist for the Lambda Literary Award for Science Fiction, Fantasy and Horror.

=== Past Imperfect series ===
The Past Imperfect series is a fan-fiction novel series based on the television show Star Trek: Voyager. The series consists of X novels: Past Imperfect (2002), Present Tension (2005), Future Perfect (2007), No Return (2007), and Forward Motion (2008).

== Awards and honors ==
Awards and honors for DeLancey's writing
Year	Title	Award/Honor	Result	Ref.
2016	The Caphenon	Lambda Literary Award for Science Fiction, Fantasy and Horror	Finalist	
2016	Without a Front: The Producer's Challenge	Goldie Award for Science Fiction/ Fantasy	Finalist	
2016	Without a Front: The Warrior's Challenge	Goldie Award for Science Fiction/ Fantasy	Winner	
2017	The Caphenon	Independent Publisher Book Award for Best SciFi/Fantasy/Horror eBook	Bronze	
2017	Catalyst	Goldie Award for Science Fiction/ Fantasy	Finalist	
2017	Vellmar the Blade	SFR Galaxy Award for Best Mother-Daughter Dynamic	Winner	
2019	Resilience	Lambda Literary Award for Science Fiction, Fantasy and Horror	Finalist	

== Publications ==
- Mac vs. PC (2014)

=== Chronicles of Alsea series ===
The following are the Chronicle of Alsea books in story order:

- The Caphenon (2015)
- Projection, a novella (2015)
- Without a Front: The Producer's Challenge (2015)
- Without a Front: The Warrior's Challenge (2015)
- Catalyst (2016)
- Vellmar the Blade (2016)
- Outcaste (2017)
- Resilience (2018)
- Uprising (2019)
- Far Enough, a novella (2020)
- Alsea Rising: Gathering Storm (2020)
- Alsea Rising: The Seventh Star (2020)

=== Past Imperfect series ===
- Past Imperfect (2002)
- Present Tension (2005)
- Future Perfect (2007)
- No Return (2007)
- Forward Motion (2008)

=== Anthology contributions ===
- Second Helpings, Read These Lips: Volume Two: Lesbian Short Writings, edited by Evecho and Linda Lorenzo (2008)
- Spread the Love, edited by Astrid Ohletz (2014)
- Unwrap These Presents, edited by Astrid Ohletz and R.G. Emanuelle (2014)
- Don't Be Shy: Volume 2: A Collection of Erotic Lesbian Stories, edited by Astrid Ohletz and Jae (2015)
- Ylva Pride 2016 (2016)

=== Anthologies edited ===
- Do You Feel What I Feel: A Holiday Anthology, with Jae (2015)
