= Pam Keesey =

American writer

- Occupation: Writer, editor, librarian
- Language: English
- Education: Hamline University; University of Bradford
- Genre: fantasy, speculative fiction, horror
- Notable works: Dark Angels (1993); Daughters of Darkness (1995); Women Who Run with the Werewolves (1996); Vamps: An Illustrated History of the Femme Fatale (1997)

Pam Keesey is an American writer. She published three fantasy anthologies – Dark Angels (1993), Daughters of Darkness (1995), and Women Who Run with the Werewolves (1996) – and a history book, Vamps: An Illustrated History of the Femme Fatale. She is a two-time nominee for the Lambda Literary Award for Speculative Fiction.

== Biography ==
Originally working at an A&W while in high school, Keesey worked at a public library and eventually a university library. She got a bachelor's degree from Hamline University and a master's degree from University of Bradford.

Keesey published two lesbian vampire anthologies, Dark Angels (1993) and Daughters of Darkness (1995). In 1996, she published Women Who Run with the Werewolves, an anthology of stories involving women werewolves. These three anthologies featured works from Suzy McKee Charnas, Sheridan Le Fanu, Ursula K. Le Guin, Charlee Jacob, Thomas Piccirilli, Cecilia Tan, and Melanie Tem. In 1997, she wrote Vamps: An Illustrated History of the Femme Fatale.

Keesey was nominated twice for the Lambda Literary Award for Speculative Fiction, for Dark Angels in 1996 and Women Who Run With Werewolves in 1997. She was a guest of honor at the first CONvergence in 1999.

Keesey worked as head librarian of the Resource Center of the Americas' Penny Lernoux Memorial Library. She also worked at Llewellyn Worldwide as a Spanish-language editor. She later worked in the tech industry, working as a senior technical writer for Microsoft and as a content manager for Amazon and Expedia.

Keesey is lesbian, which she had discovered after the anti-LGBT Save Our Children movement. As of 1995, Keeney was based in Minneapolis.

== Bibliography ==
- (as editor) Dark Angels (1988)
- (as editor) Daughters of Darkness (1993)
- (as editor) Women Who Run with the Werewolves (1996)
- Vamps: An Illustrated History of the Femme Fatale (1997)
