= Mac Crane =

American writer

- Born: Marisa Crane; Allentown, Pennsylvania, United States
- Education: Drexel University
- Occupation: Writer
- Children: 2
- Writing career
- Language: English
- Genre: Speculative fiction
- Subjects: Nonfiction essays, poetry
- Notable work: I Keep My Exoskeletons to Myself (2023)
- Notable awards: Lambda Literary Award (2024)
- Website: www.marisacrane.org

Mac Crane is an American writer. Their debut novel, I Keep My Exoskeletons to Myself, won the Lambda Literary Award for Speculative Fiction. Their short stories and nonfiction have appeared in Literary Hub, The Sun, TriQuarterly, Prairie Schooner, Joyland, The Offing, No Tokens, Passages North, The Rumpus, and elsewhere.

== Early life and education ==
Crane was born in Allentown, Pennsylvania and raised in Philadelphia. They were heavily involved in sports growing up and were also an avid reader. From the age of six they aspired to be an author and a WNBA player. They went on to play NCAA Division 1 basketball at Drexel University, but were unable to pursue a professional career due to multiple ACL tears.

== Career ==
Crane's work includes poetry, nonfiction essays, and fiction. Their debut poetry collection, Our Debatable Bodies, was published in 2019.

Crane began writing their debut novel in 2018 and initially completed it as a short story. However, after losing their job, they shifted focus to writing full-time and converting I Keep My Exoskeletons to Myself to a novel. The novel centers a queer parent, Kris, navigating parenthood after the loss of their partner during childbirth in a world where the government attaches extra shadows to those who have committed acts of harm or violence. The novel was published in January 2023 (under their birth name, Marisa Crane) by Catapult and received positive critical reception. It was included on "Best Book" lists by Esquire, Library Journal, The Chicago Review of Books, and others. The book won the 2024 Lambda Literary Award for Speculative Fiction.

Their second novel, A Sharp Endless Need, is a coming-of-age story centered around a high school basketball star dealing with the death of her father and a complicated relationship with their best friend. It was released in 2025 by Dial Press. The novel was a finalist for the 2026 Lambda Literary Award for Lesbian Fiction.

Their debut short story collection, Perverts, was published July 7, 2026 from Dial Press. The Chicago Review of Books listed it as one of "Our Most Anticipated Books of 2026." Book Riot called the book, "A provocative and uproarious collection about pleasure, performance, and pain, Perverts is an exaltation of the awesome depravity of queer modernity."

== Personal life ==
Crane is queer and nonbinary, and uses they/them pronouns. They are married with two children and reside in San Diego.

== Bibliography ==
=== Novels ===
- I Keep My Exoskeletons to Myself. Catapult. 2023. ISBN 9781646222063.
- A Sharp Endless Need. Dial Press. 2025. ISBN 9780593733646.

=== Short story collection ===
- Perverts. Dial Press. 2026. ISBN 9780593733677.

=== Poetry collection ===
- Our Debatable Bodies. Animal Heart Press. 2019. ISBN 9780359542345.
