= Mark Merlis =

American writer and health policy analyst (1950 –2017)

- Born: March 9, 1950; Framingham, Massachusetts, U.S.
- Died: August 15, 2017 (aged 67); Pennsylvania Hospital, Philadelphia, Pennsylvania, U.S.
- Education: Wesleyan University; Brown University
- Occupations: Writer; health policy analyst
- Spouse: Robert Ashe
- Writing career
- Notable awards: Ferro-Grumley Award (1995)

Mark Merlis (March 9, 1950 – August 15, 2017) was an American writer and health policy analyst.

== Biography ==
Born in Framingham, Massachusetts on March 9, 1950, and raised in Baltimore, Maryland, Merlis attended Wesleyan University and Brown University. He subsequently took a job with the Maryland Department of Health to support himself while writing. In 1987, he took a job with the Congressional Research Service at the Library of Congress as a social legislation specialist, and was involved in the creation of the Ryan White Care Act.

Beginning in the 1990s, Merlis published a series of novels. His first novel, American Studies, was published in 1994 and won the Ferro-Grumley Award for LGBT Literature and the Los Angeles Times Book Prize Art Seidenbaum Award for First Fiction in 1995, and his second, An Arrow's Flight, was published in 1998 and won the 1999 Lambda Literary Award for Gay Fiction. He published two further novels during his lifetime, Man About Town in 2003 and JD in 2015.

Merlis lived in Philadelphia, Pennsylvania, and worked both as an author and an independent health policy consultant.

== Illness and death ==
Merlis died on August 15, 2017, at the Pennsylvania Hospital in Philadelphia, from pneumonia associated with ALS. He was sixty-seven years old. He is survived by his husband of many years, Robert Ashe.

== Works ==
- American Studies (1994)
- An Arrow's Flight (1998) - also published as Pyrrhus (1999)
- Man About Town (2003)
- JD (2015)
