= Jameson Currier =

American novelist (1955–2026)

- Born: October 16, 1955; Marietta, Georgia, U.S.
- Died: July 13, 2026 (aged 70); Upstate New York, U.S.
- Education: Emory University (BA)
- Writing career
- Period: 1990s–2026
- Genres: fiction, literary criticism
- Notable works: Dancing on the Moon, Where the Rainbow Ends, The Wolf at the Door

Jameson Currier (October 16, 1955 – July 13, 2026) was an American novelist, short story writer, poet, critic, journalist, editor and publisher.

== Early life and education ==
Currier was born in Marietta, Georgia, on October 16, 1955. He earned a B.A. in English from Emory University, where he participated in music and theater groups. He began graduate studies in dramatic literature at New York University in 1978, but left before completing a degree.

== Career ==
Currier took a position with an entertainment publicity firm that handled theater accounts while pursuing his writing part-time. His first short stories centered on the comic adventures of a group of nomadic performers that he based on his friends. The subject and theme of his short stories changed as many of these friends became early casualties of the AIDS epidemic.

Writer David B. Feinberg brought Currier's AIDS stories to the attention of Edward Iwanicki, an editor at Viking Penguin who published the work of many gay male writers. Currier's first published collection of short stories, Dancing on the Moon: Short Stories About AIDS (1993), focused on the impact of AIDS on the families, friends, and partners of gay men who were facing the disease.

In the early 1990s, Currier contributed anonymous book reviews to the trade magazine Publishers Weekly and he then reviewed gay-themed books for local and national gay and mainstream publications. He was a member of the National Book Critics Circle from 1994 to 2000.

From 1993 to 1996, Currier wrote features, articles, and interviews for Body Positive, a monthly magazine for the HIV-positive community. He wrote the screenplay for the documentary film Living Proof: HIV and the Pursuit of Happiness (1994), based on the studio portraits of HIV-positive people by photographer Carolyn Jones.

In 1998, Currier published his debut novel Where the Rainbow Ends, about a young gay man from the South who arrives to Manhattan in the late 1970s and falls in with a group of artistic friends, who are pulled apart and bonded together by the unexpected challenges of the AIDS epidemic. The novel was a shortlisted nominee for the Lambda Literary Award for Gay Fiction at the 11th Lambda Literary Awards in 1999.

He continued to write short stories on AIDS issues and gay male relationships, several of which were first published in new Internet ventures such as Blithe House Quarterly and Velvet Mafia. His second book of short fiction, Desire, Lust, Passion, Sex (2004), collected many of these stories.

Currier continued to work as a literary critic and journalist. He served in the late 1990s as an editor of the gay Manhattan weekly newspaper, The New York Blade, where he reported the behind-the-scenes story of the addition of the Stonewall Inn to the National Register of Historic Places.

After the events of 9/11, Currier wrote A Gathering Storm, a novel inspired by the beating of Matthew Shepard. He published it in 2014.

From 2001 to 2010, Currier reported on news items of interest to the LGBTQ publishing community, first in a column for the print journal Lambda Book Review, then in QueerType, his monthly Internet blog.

In 2008, Currier collected three decades of his short fiction about the impact of AIDS on the lives of gay men in Still Dancing: New and Selected Stories, which was published by Lethe Press, a small press begun by author Steve Berman.

The following year, Currier's gay-themed ghost stories, were published as The Haunted Heart and Other Tales. The stories depict contemporary issues of the gay community in a supernatural setting. Included in the collection was "The Bloomsbury Nudes", a short story that revolves around Duncan Grant and Aleister Crowley and which was first published in the Bram Stoker Award-winning anthology Unspeakable Horror: From the Shadows of the Closet.

In 2010, Currier established Chelsea Station Editions, an independent press devoted to gay literature. He served as the publisher, editor, and designer. The first book the press published was The Wolf at the Door, Currier's tale of a haunted gay-owned guesthouse in New Orleans. The novel was a shortlisted nominee for the Gaylactic Spectrum Award for Best Novel in 2011.

In 2011, Chelsea Station Editions published books by Felice Picano; Jon Marans, Michael Graves, Craig Moreau, Charles Silverstein and Wesley Gibson, along with Currier's third novel, The Third Buddha, which explores the effects of the World Trade Center attacks on a group of gay men and which is partially set in Afghanistan.

In the fall of 2011, Currier launched Chelsea Station magazine, a journal devoted to gay literature that published sporadically until he re-launched the magazine in 2014 as a web journal.

Over the course of the next three years, Chelsea Station Editions issued debut books written by Jeffrey Luscombe, J.R. Greenwell, William Sterling Walker, Gil Cole, and Dan Lopez. The press became home to Currier's previously published work through reprint editions. It continued to publish his new work, including What Comes Around (2012), a novel of linked stories written in the second person, The Forever Marathon (2013), A Gathering Storm (2014), and Until My Heart Stops (2015), a collection of nonfiction essays and memoirs, including those detailing his medical diagnosis of hypertrophic cardiomyopathy.

== Personal life and death ==
Currier was a member of the Horror Writers Association and the board of directors of the Arch and Bruce Brown Foundation. He died on July 13, 2026, at the age of 70.

== Works ==
- Dancing on the Moon: Short Stories About AIDS (1993)
- Living Proof: HIV and the Pursuit of Happiness (1994)
- Where the Rainbow Ends (1998)
- Desire, Lust, Passion, Sex (2004)
- Les Fantômes (2005)
- Still Dancing: New and Selected Stories (2008)
- The Haunted Heart and Other Tales (2009)
- The Wolf at the Door (2010)
- The Third Buddha (2011)
- What Comes Around (2012)
- The Forever Marathon (2013)
- A Gathering Storm (2014)
- Based on a True Story (2015)
- Until My Heart Stops (2015)
- Why Didn't Someone Warn You About Prince Charming? (2019)
- Paul's Cat (2022)
- The Candlelight Ghost (2023)
- The Man That Got Away (2024)
- We Are Made of Stars (2024)
