= Lee Thomas (horror writer) =

American author of horror fiction

Lee Thomas is an American author of horror fiction. He is best known for his novels The Dust of Wonderland and The German, both of which have won the Lambda Literary Award for SF/Fantasy/Horror. In addition to numerous magazines, his short fiction has appeared in dozens of anthologies and magazines both in print and in digital formats. He has won the Bram Stoker Award for his novel Stained.

Writing as Thomas Pendleton and Dallas Reed, he is the author of the Wicked Dead series of novels for Young Adults (with Stefan Petrucha), and the novels, Mason, Shimmer, and The Calling, all from HarperTeen.

Openly gay, Lee currently lives in Austin, Texas, where he's working on a number of projects.

== Awards ==
- Bram Stoker Award for his novel Stained. (Also nominated for his novel The German, his short story collection In the Closet, Under the Bed, and the short stories, "An Apiary of White Bees", and "Turtle".)
- Lambda Literary Award for The Dust of Wonderland (also a finalist for his short story collections, In the Closet, Under the Bed, and Like Light for Flies,).
- Lambda Literary Award for The German.

== Bibliography ==
=== Novels, Novellas, Collections (as Lee Thomas) ===
- Stained
- Parish Damned (Telos)
- Damage (Sarob)
- The Dust of Wonderland (Alyson)
- In the Closet, Under the Bed (Dark Scribe)
- The Black Sun Set (Burning Effigy Press)
- Focus (w Nate Southard) (Thunderstorm Books)
- Crisis
- Torn (Cemetery Dance)
- The German (Lethe Press)
- Ash Street (Sinister Grin)
- Like Light for Flies (Lethe)
- Butcher's Road (Lethe)

=== Novels (as Thomas Pendleton with Stefan Petrucha) ===
- Wicked Dead: Lurker (HarperTeen)
- Wicked Dead: Torn (HarperTeen)
- Wicked Dead: Snared (HarperTeen)
- Wicked Dead: Crush (HarperTeen)
- Wicked Dead: Prey (HarperTeen)

=== Novels (as Thomas Pendleton and Dallas Reed) ===
- Mason (HarperTeen)
- Shimmer (HarperTeen)
- The Calling (HarperTeen)
- Exiled

=== Short fiction ===
- "Whimper Beg", in Datlow, Ellen (ed.), Echoes, Tor Publishing, 2020.
- "The Butcher's Block", Like Light for Flies, Collected Stories, Lethe Press 2013.
- "Fine in the Fire", Like Light for Flies, Collected Stories, Lethe Press 2013.
- "Landfall '35", Like Light for Flies, Collected Stories, Lethe Press 2013.
- "The Hollow is Filled with Beautiful Monsters", Night Shadows, ed. Greg Herren, Bold Strokes Books 2012.
- "Comfortable in Her Skin", Supernatural Noir, ed. Ellen Datlow, Dark Horse Books, 2011.
- "The Dodd Contrivance", Swallowed by the Cracks, ed. John Everson & Bill Breedlove, Dark Arts Books, 2011.
- "Flicker", Horror Library, Vol. 4, ed. R.J. Cavendar & Boyd Harris, Cutting Block Press, 2010.
- "Testify", Blood Splattered and Politically Incorrect, Cemetery Dance, 2010.
- "The Fall of the Mountain King", Specters in Coal Dust, ed. Michael Knost, Woodland Press, 2010.
- "Inside Where It's Warm", Dead Set, ed. Michelle McCrary & Joe McKinney, 23 House, 2010.
- "Nothing Forgiven", Darkness on the Edge, ed. Harrison Howe, PS Publishing, 2010.
- "All the Faces Change", In the Closet, Under the Bed, Dark Scribe Press, 2009.
- "Shelter", In the Closet, Under the Bed, Dark Scribe Press, 2009.
- "Appetite of the Cyber Tribes", In the Closet, Under the Bed, Dark Scribe Press, 2009.
- "Crack Smokin' Grandpa", In the Closet, Under the Bed, Dark Scribe Press, 2009.
- "I Know You're There", In the Closet, Under the Bed, Dark Scribe Press, 2009.
- "Down to Sleep", In the Closet, Under the Bed, Dark Scribe Press, 2009.
- "Tears to Rust", In the Closet, Under the Bed, Dark Scribe Press, 2009.
- "The Tattered Boy", In the Closet, Under the Bed, Dark Scribe Press, 2009.
- "Tuesday", Bits of the Dead, ed. Keith Gouveia, Coscom Entertainment, 2008.
- "The Good and Gone", Killers, ed. Colin Harvey, Swimming Kangaroo Books, 2008.
- "I'm Your Violence", Unspeakable Horror, ed. Vince Liaguno & Chad Helder, Dark Scribe Press, 2008.
- "Turtle", Doorways Magazine, 2008.
- "An Apiary of White Bees", Inferno, ed. Ellen Datlow, Tor Books, 2007.
- "Sweet Fields", Space and Time Magazine, 2007.
- "They Would Say She Danced", Horror World, 2007.
- "To Wake Screaming from the American Dream", Red Scream Magazine, 2006.
- "It's What Isn't There", Sybil's Garage, 2006.
- "Anthem of the Estranged", A Walk on the Darkside, ed. John Pelan, Roc, 2004.
- "Pierce", Circus, Lone Wolf Publications, 2004.
- "Opiate of the Masses", The Book of Final Flesh, ed. James Lowder, Eden Studios, 2004.
- "Before You Go", Chizine, 2004.
- "Lullaby", Gothic.net, 2002.
- "Healer", Stillwaters Journal, 2002.
- "Mason", The Swamp, 2002.
- "Static", Horrorfind, 2002.
- "Warmth", Fortean Bureau, 2002.
- "Contraction", Horrorfind, 2001.
