= Lara Elena Donnelly =

American author of speculative fiction

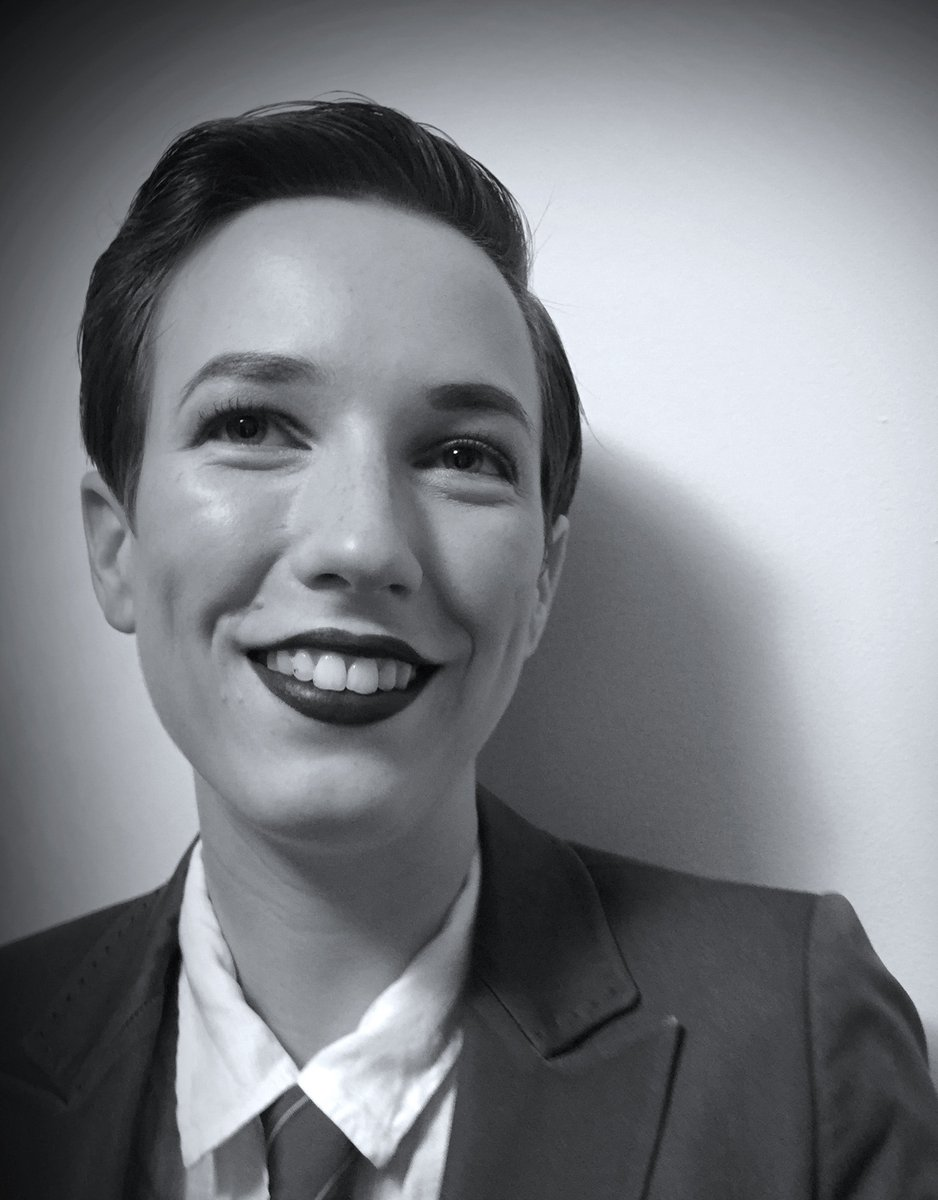
- Born: 1990 (age 35–36)
- Known for: Speculative fiction
- Website: laradonnelly.com

Lara Elena Donnelly (born 1990) is an American author of speculative fiction. She is a graduate of the 2012 Clarion Workshop. Her short fiction and poetry have appeared in Strange Horizons, Mythic Delirium, Escape Pod, Nightmare Magazine, and Uncanny Magazine.

Her debut novel, Amberlough, was published by Tor Books in February 2017, and was nominated for the 2017 Nebula Award for Best Novel, the 2017 Lambda Literary Award and included on the 2017 Locus Recommended Reading List. The sequel, Armistice, was published by Tor in May 2018. The third title in the Amberlough Dossier, Amnesty, followed in April 2019. In 2020 Donnelly sold her next novel, Base Notes to Thomas & Mercer, which was published in February 2022. Most recently, Donnelly Lara's novella No Such Thing as Duty was published by Neon Hemlock in April 2025.

== Bibliography ==
=== Novels ===
==== The Amberlough Dossier ====
- Amberlough (Tor Books, 2017) ISBN 978-0765383815
- Armistice (Tor Books, 2018) ISBN 978-1250173560
- Amnesty (Tor Books, 2019) ISBN 978-1250173621

==== Stand-alone ====
- Base Notes (Thomas & Mercer, 2022) ISBN 978-1542030700

=== Short fiction ===
- "Making Us Monsters" (Uncanny Magazine, 2017) Written with Sam J. Miller

=== Comics ===
- Jim Henson's Labyrinth: Masquerade #1 (Boom! Studios, 2020)
