= Lindsey Drager =

American author and professor of creative writing

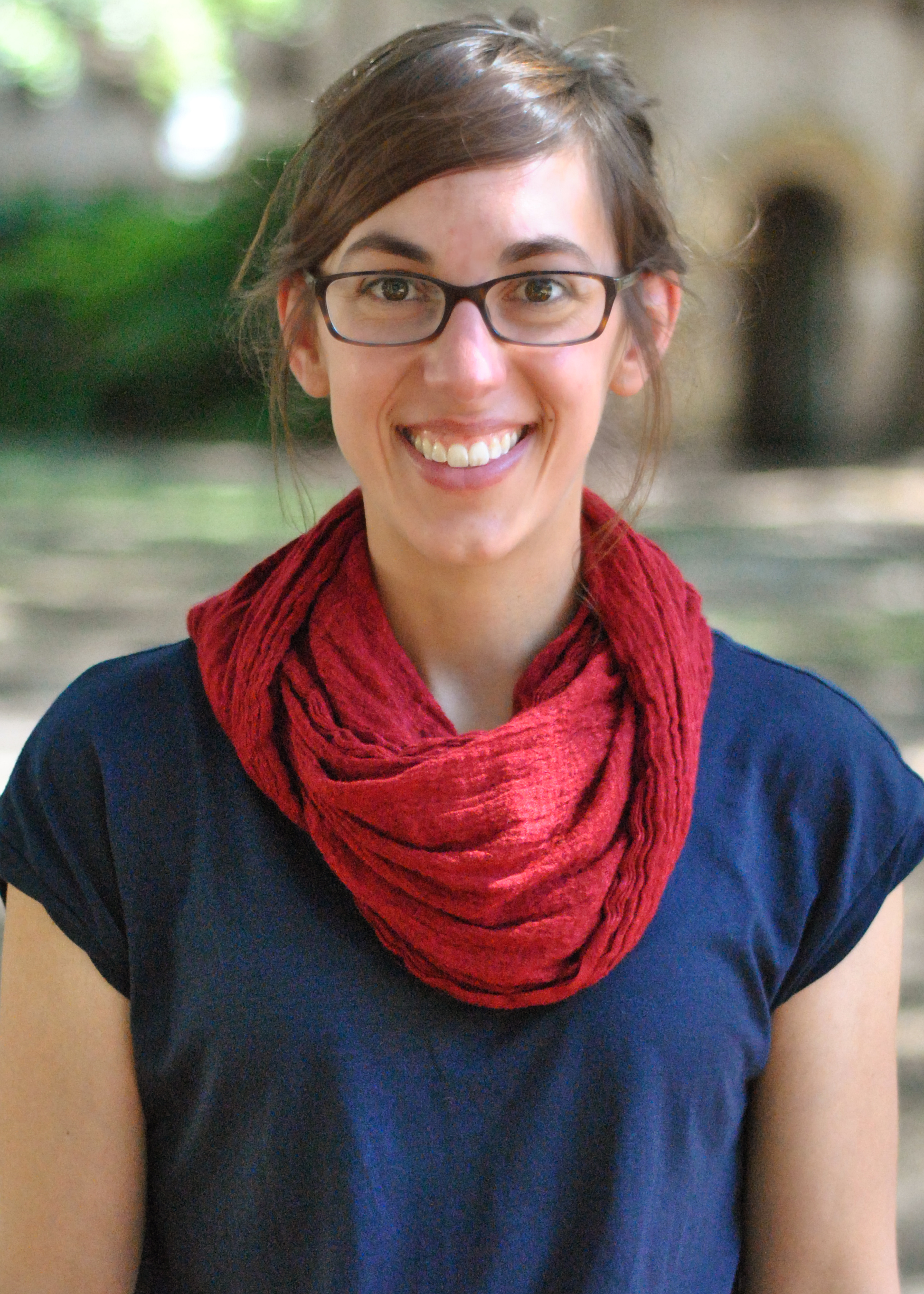
Lindsey Drager

Lindsey Drager (born October 9, 1986) is an American author and professor of creative writing at the University of Utah.

== Education and career ==
Drager was born in Toledo, Ohio. She earned her BA in writing and English language and literature from Grand Valley State University in Allendale, Michigan, and an MFA in fiction from the University of Illinois. While at Illinois, she studied under the novelist Richard Powers and worked for Dalkey Archive Press.

After spending a year in Los Angeles working for a textbook publishing company, she entered the PhD program at the University of Denver where she worked as an editor of the Denver Quarterly and a writing consultant at the St. Francis Center, a day shelter for those experiencing homelessness. She also taught writing at the Rocky Mountain College of Art + Design as well as Lighthouse Writer's Workshop.

From 2016 to 2019 she was an assistant professor of creative writing at the College of Charleston. In 2019, she joined the faculty of the creative writing program at the University of Utah. Since 2020, she has served as associate fiction editor of West Branch literary journal.

== Writing and reception ==
Drager has said she is highly influenced by visual art, in particular the work of Escher. In a Tupelo Quarterly interview, she said, "Much of my interest has been to reveal how language behaves in certain environments, and what forces are—overtly or obliquely—governing those behaviors."

Her first novel, The Sorrow Proper (Dzanc, 2015), explores the hypothetical end of the public library system. Called "a remarkable and mature debut" in a starred Library Journal review, it was awarded the 2016 Binghamton University John Gardner Fiction Prize. In 2017, it was made available in braille.

In 2017, Dzanc released her second novel, The Lost Daughter Collective, a "gender-bending gothic cautionary tale". The book was deemed "intelligent and densely layered" (Kirkus Reviews) and "formally rich" (Publishers Weekly). In her The Rumpus review, Ilana Masad noted, "Drager continues to be a force and should be recognized widely for her work."

Drager says her projects try to explore the questions: "What does it mean to have a body, to own a body, be a body, be bodied? How is that body constructed by others when it enters the public arena? How is that body governed by time, both the literal constructs of the temporal (bodies move always toward decay) and cultural periods, zeitgeist (bodies, depending on era, mean differently)? In other words: How are our bodies—like our books—authored and read?"

In 2019, her novel The Archive of Alternate Endings was among NPR's best books of the year. It was awarded the 2022 Bard Fiction Prize.

In 2020, Drager was the recipient of a National Endowment for the Arts Fellowship in Prose.

Her influences include Rikki Ducornet, Carole Maso, Renee Gladman, Zora Neale Hurston, Kate Bernheimer, Kathryn Davis, Mary Shelley, Percival Everett, Thalia Field, Donald Barthelme, Michael Ondaatje and Herman Melville.

== Books ==
Novels

- The Sorrow Proper (2015). Dzanc Books.
- The Lost Daughter Collective (2017). Dzanc Books.
- The Archive of Alternate Endings (2019). Dzanc Books.
- The Avian Hourglass (2024). Dzanc Books.

== Selected essays ==
- "The Novella is Not the Novel’s Daughter: An Argument in Notes". Michigan Quarterly Review blog.
- "The World Without Libraries: A Speculation". Huffington Post.
- "The Absence of the Book and the Future of the Work: Blanchot. Barthelme, and Creative Reading Practice". New Writing: The International Journal for the Practice and Theory of Creative Writing.
