= Ilana Masad =

Israeli American writer

- Born: Los Angeles, California, U.S.
- Education: Sarah Lawrence College (BA); University of Nebraska–Lincoln (PhD)
- Writing career
- Notable work: Beings (2025)
- Notable awards: Lambda Literary Award for Speculative Fiction (2026)
- Website: ilanamasad.com

Ilana Masad is an American writer of fiction, nonfiction, and criticism. Masad is the author of All My Mother's Lovers (2020) and Beings (2025), as well as the co-editor of Here for All the Reasons: Why We Watch 'The Bachelor' (2026). Beings won the 2026 Lambda Literary Award for Speculative Fiction.

== Early life and education ==
Masad was born in Los Angeles, California and grew up near Tel Aviv. She received her undergraduate degree from Sarah Lawrence College. While in college, she spent a year studying abroad at the University of Oxford. She earned a Doctor of Philosophy in English from the University of Nebraska–Lincoln.

== Career ==
Masad's criticism, interviews, and reviews have appeared in The New Yorker, New York Times, Washington Post, NPR, Los Angeles Times, Los Angeles Review of Books, The Guardian, LitHub, and more. She is the founder and host of The Other Stories, a podcast featuring new, emerging, and established writers.

=== All My Mother's Lovers (2020) ===
All My Mother's Lovers is a novel published by E. P. Dutton on May 26, 2020. Written from dual perspectives, the novel centers Maggie Krause and her mother, Iris, who dies in a car crash. Upon returning to her childhood home, Maggie discovers letters Iris wanted her to send to five men. Instead of mailing the letters, Maggie embarks on a road trip, learning that the letters are addressed to men with whom Iris had extramarital affairs. As Maggie meets these men, she learns more about Iris and herself.

All My Mother's Lovers received mixed reviews from critics. In a starred review, Publishers Weekly commended the book for reflecting "the strangeness and beauty of coming to see one's parent fully as a human being". Elena Sheppard, writing for the Los Angeles Review of Books, described All My Mother's Lovers as "a mystery, a coming-of-age and road story, written with enough urgency and intrigue to call it a page-turner". Kirkus Reviews called All My Mother's Lovers "an intriguing but uneven debut". They praised Masad for "depicting queer characters as multifaceted human beings who are not defined solely by their sexuality or gender", as well as for depicting a middle-aged women "as beings who desire and wish to be desired", points Sheppard also made. However, Kirkus found several elements of the writing "kind of kitschy", with unnecessary surprises, "voyeuristic" looks at the mother's affairs, and "a big reveal that feels melodramatic and a bit cheap".

=== Beings (2025) ===
Beings is a speculative fiction novel, published by Bloomsbury Publishing on September 23, 2025. Covering multiple decades, the novel connects three stories in-part related to alien abduction. The present focuses on the Archivist, who is nonbinary and chronically ill, while they research the past, discovering an interracial couple and a lesbian novelist in the 1960s. The couple, known only as husband and wife and inspired by Barney and Betty Hill, learn through hypnosis that they had been abducted by aliens, resulting in the beginning of alien abduction narratives. Meanwhile, the novelist, Phyllis Egerton struggles with isolation due to her identity, alongside developing science fiction community. The Archivist feels drawn Phyllis's exploration of her sexuality and gender, as well as the experience of alien abduction the couple shared, especially after a documentary filmmaker reaches out regarding newscast from their childhood that the Archivist can't remember.

Beings was well received by critics, including starred reviews from Booklist and Kirkus Reviews. Booklist's Kristine Huntley described Beings as "an incandescent exploration of memory, narrative, and sexual identity", while Kirkus called it "a dazzlingly original testament to companionship, curiosity, and faith in ourselves in times of fear and loneliness". Writing for The New York Times, Angela Lashbrook referred to Beings as "a restrained, gentle reflection on the nature of "truth" versus memory with an elegiac and satisfying ending". She highlighted the "heart and humor" Phyllis's letters bring to the novel and called the couple's story "a quiet page-turner", finding the Archivist's story "less riveting". Kirkus Reviews was particularly impressed the novel's writing, stating, "Miraculously, Masad makes this dense braid of stories easy to follow, elegantly blending serpentine sentences, endearing and intimately observed characters, natural dialogue, and playful, generous asides to keep the reader in enthralled suspense."

Beings won the 2026 Lambda Literary Award for Speculative Fiction.

== Publications ==
Novels

- Masad, Ilana (2020). All My Mother's Lovers. Dutton. ISBN 9781524745974.
- Masad, Ilana (2025). Beings. Bloomsbury Publishing. ISBN 9781639737000.

Anthology (as editor)

- Masad, Ilana; Desjarlais, Stevie K. Seibert, eds. (2026). Here for All the Reasons: Why We Watch 'The Bachelor'. Turner Publishing Company. ISBN 9781684426126.
