= 'Nathan Burgoine =

Canadian writer

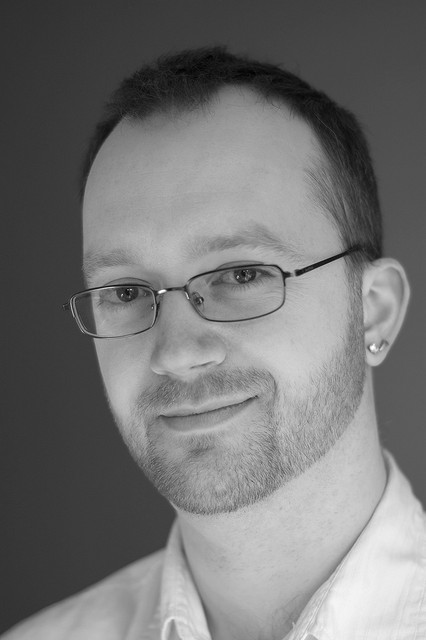
- Born: Canada
- Occupations: Short story writer; novelist
- Writing career
- Period: 2000s–present
- Notable work: Light

'Nathan Burgoine is a Canadian writer. His debut novel Light was a shortlisted Lambda Literary Award nominee in the Science Fiction, Fantasy and Horror category at the 26th Lambda Literary Awards. The novel was published by Bold Strokes Books in 2013.

He has also published short stories and non-fiction essays in a variety of anthologies and literary magazines, including Fool for Love: New Gay Fiction, Men of the Mean Streets, Boys of Summer, Night Shadows, This is How You Die, Blood Sacraments, Wings, Erotica Exotica, Raising Hell, Tented, Tales from the Den, Afternoon Pleasures, I Like It Like That and 5x5.

He lives in Ottawa, Ontario with his husband Daniel and their dog Max. Burgoine, Max, and his late dog Coach, all experience heterochromia iridum.

The apostrophe that appears at the start of his first name (originally Jonathan) is an homage to his favourite teacher.

== Works ==
- Light (2013)
- Three (2016)
- In Memoriam (2016)
- Triad Blood (2016)
- Handmade Holidays (2017)
- Triad Soul (2017)
- Exit Plans for Teenage Freaks (2018)
- Of Echoes Born (2018)
- Saving the Date (2018)
- Faux Ho Ho (2019)
