= Deborah Bright =

American photographer and professor

- Born: 1950 (age 75–76)
- Education: University of Chicago, MFA, 1975
- Occupations: Fine-art photographer, Professor
- Website: www.deborahbright.net

Deborah Bright (born 1950) is a 20th-century American photographer and artist, writer, and educator. She is particularly noted for her imagery and scholarship on queer desire and politics, as well as on the ideologies of American landscape photography. Her work is in the collections of the Smithsonian American Art Museum, the Fogg Art Museum, and the Whitney Museum of American Art. Bright's photographic projects have been exhibited internationally.

== Life and career ==
Bright grew up in Washington, D.C. She received her M.F.A. from the University of Chicago in 1975.

Bright joined the faculty at the Rhode Island School of Design in 1989 with a joint appointment in History of Art and Visual Culture (HAVC) and Photography. She also served RISD in many other capacities, from department head to stepping in as Acting Dean of Fine Arts, until 2012 when Bright left RISD to become chair of Fine Arts at the Pratt Institute. Since her retirement from Pratt, Bright lives in Brooklyn, NY and has resumed painting queer abstractions.

== Artistic works ==
Bright is notable for her writing and photographic bodies of work on LGBT, queer, and women's rights subject matter, as well as for her writing about and work on landscape photography.

=== Gender and sexuality ===
==== Dream Girls (1989–1990) ====
Bright first gained renown for her series called Dream Girls (1989–90), which challenged mainstream, heteronormative gender-sex identities propagated in Hollywood movies. Inspired by her adolescent fantasies, Bright recreated iconic Hollywood movie scenes of the 20th century, inserting herself into film stills from the 1940s and 50s. She appears in place of such iconic romantic male leads as Spencer Tracy and Rock Hudson opposite their female counterparts, including Katharine Hepburn, in a fulfillment of lesbian desire that thematizes gender and LGBTQ+ subject matter.

==== Being and Riding (1996–1999) ====
While working on Dream Girls, Bright also worked on a similarly themed photographic series called Being and Riding (1996–1999), which focuses on a common female childhood obsession with horses. The series featured provocatively framed plastic toy horses and female figures.

In 2008, Bright collaborated with other artists in an exhibition called Pink and Bent: Art of Queer Women. The exhibition took place at the Leslie-Lohman Museum of Gay and Lesbian Art on May 21-June 28, 2008 and was curated by Pilar Gallego and Cora Lambert.

In the wake of the 2016 Presidential election of Donald Trump over Hillary Clinton, Bright participated in the Nasty Women project (2017) along with other female artists. The exhibition took place at The Knockdown Center in Maspeth, Queens, New York

==== Non-photographic works ====
Between 2015 and 2017 after her retirement from Pratt, Bright began creating a series of works using colored pencil and graphite on Bristol board. The five works, Whiskey Tango Foxtrot, Bad Moon Rising, My Egypt, Funkflash, and Night Radio, all work together to defy traditional gender norms.

=== Landscape photography ===
==== Battlefield Panoramas (1981–1984) ====
Bright's 1983 work, Bloody Lane, The Battle of Antietam, was displayed at the Smithsonian in 1992. Bloody Lane consists of six 13x19 inch selenium toned silver prints, which are part of her Battlefield Panoramas series. The work was also displayed at the Siskind Center from September 1993 – January 1994.

Crow Agency: Battle of the Little Big Horn is part of her Battlefield Panoramas series (1981–84), which references the nineteenth-century panorama photography tradition of Edweard Muybridge and William Henry Jackson. This color photography series represents a bodily immersion view of the battlefield from the perspective of those on the ground fighting rather than from the traditional landscape perspective from on high. The views are dominated by the tall grasses and draws of the Montana landscape.

==== All That Is Solid ====
Her installation piece All that is Solid was displayed from 1992 to 2001 in five cities throughout the United States. She installed each piece based on their location; Bright wanted the work to reflect the area's de-industrialization in addition to former industrial areas through the local details.

==== Manifest Series ====
In Bright's Manifest series the artist explores agricultural enclosures and family heritage in New England symbolized by the omnipresent stone walls, and focuses on self definition and political enfranchisement centered on individual male property ownership. Her work was made around the same time as her All that is Solid piece in 2000–01.

==== Glacial Erratic (2000–2003) ====
From 2000 to 2003, Bright created Glacial Erratic, which consists of nine photographs of Plymouth Rock at different tides and times of day, akin to Claude Monet's series of Cathedral and Haystacks 19th-century Impressionist paintings. For this body of work, Bright photographed the rock in tight framing that reveals the iconic rock's containment within a metal fence and secured as a tourist site. The rock's difference from the surrounding geological landscape reveals its displacement.

== Publications ==
=== Edited books ===
- The Passionate Camera: Photography and Bodies of Desire, 1st ed, Routledge, 1998.

=== Articles and scholarship authored ===
- "Michael Bishop and The Mystique of Mediocrity," The New Art Examiner, April 1979.
- "Reconsidering the Stieglitz Era," The New Art Examiner, March 1980.
- "By Arrangement," The New Art Examiner, February 1981.
- "Transformations in Photography," The New Art Examiner, July 1981.
- "Before Photography," The New Art Examiner, June 1982. "Double-Edged Constructions: The Work of Barbara Crane," Afterimage, October 1981.
- "Once Upon A Time In The West," Afterimage, October 1984.
- "Many Are Called, Few Are Chosen," Afterimage, Summer 1985.
- "Of Mother Nature and Marlboro Men", An Inquiry Into the Cultural Meanings of Landscape Photography. Exposure 23.1 (1985).
- "Landscape As Photograph," exposure, 25:1, 1987.
- "Public Projections and Private Images, Afterimage, May 1987.
- "The ‘Other Body’ of British Photography, Afterimage, November 1987.
- "Confusing My Students, Eating My Words," exposure, 26:2/3, 1988.
- "Engendered Dilemmas," Views, Spring 1989.
- "Paradise Recycled: Art, Ecology, and the End of Nature," Afterimage, September 1990.
- "Wait Till Donald Trump Buys the Whitney," Michigan Quarterly Review, 29:1, Winter 1990.
- "The Machine in the Garden Revisited: American Environmentalism and Photographic Aesthetics", Art Journal, vol. 51, no. 2, 1992, pp. 60–71.
- "Reactionary Modernism: Lee Friedlander’s Nudes for the Nineties,"Afterimage, January 1993.
- "Sex Wars: Photography on the Frontlines," Exposure 29:2/3, 1994.
- "Exposing Family Values: Family Photography and Sexual Dissent," A Family Affair (Christopher Scoates, ed.), Atlanta: Atlanta College of Art Gallery, 1995.
- "Pictures, Perverts and Politics," The Passionate Camera: photography and bodies of desire, Londonand New York: Routledge, 1998.
- The Passionate Camera: Photography and Bodies of Desire, 1st ed, Routledge, 1998.
- "Souvenirs of Progress: The Second Empire Landscapes," The Photography of Adolph Braun, Providence: Museum of Art, Rhode Island School of Design, 1999.
- "Being and Riding", GLQ: A Journal of Lesbian and Gay Studies, vol. 6, no. 3, 2000, pp. 479–488.
- "Horse Crazy", Horsetales: American Images and Icons, 2000, 22–31.
- "Back to Basics: The New Paintings of Julie Shelton Smith," Rebuilding the Body: Julie Shelton Smith, Newport: Newport Art Museum, 2001.
- "Shopping the Leftovers: Warhol’s collecting strategies in Raid The Icebox I," Other Objects of Desire, eds. Michael Camille and Adrian Rifkin, Oxford: Blackwell, 2001.
- "Queer Plymouth", GLQ: A journal of Lesbian and Gay Studies, vol. 12, no. 2, 2006.
- "Photographing Nature, Seeing Ourselves," America in View: Landscape Photography 1865 to Now, Providence: RISD Museum of Art, 2012.

== Awards ==
- Purchase Award, Illinois State Museum, 1980
- Artist Grant, Illinois Arts Council, 1983
- National Endowment for the Humanities, 1985
- Artist Grant, Illinois Arts Council, 1986
- National Endowment for the Arts, 1988
- David and Reva Logan Award, Photographic Resource Center, 1989
- New Forms Grant, New England Foundation for the Arts,1992
- Artist Grant, Art Matters, 1994
- John R. Frazier Award for Excellence in Teaching, Rhode Is. School of Design, 1995
- Mary Ingraham Bunting Fellowship, Radcliffe Institute for Advanced Study, Harvard University, 1995
- Somerville (MA) Arts Lottery Grant, 1995
- Artist Grant, Massachusetts Arts Council, 1999
- Finalist, Visual Arts, Lambda Literary Awards, 1999 (for Passionate Camera)
- Artist in Residence Grant, CEPA Gallery, Buffalo, NY, 2001
- Honored Educator Award, Society for Photographic Education Northeast Region, 2010
- Research Fellow, Photography, Plymouth University, Plymouth, UK, 2012

== Collections ==
- Fogg Museum of Art at Harvard University, Cambridge, MA
- Whitney Museum of American Art, New York, NY
- Museum of Contemporary Photography, Chicago, IL
- Museum of Art, Rhode Island School of Design, Providence, RI
- Smithsonian American Art Museum, Washington, D.C
- Binghamton University Art Museum, Binghamton, NY
- Leslie-Lohman Museum of Gay and Lesbian Art, New York, NY
- Addison Gallery of American Art Phillips Andover Academy, Andover, MA
- Boston Athenaeum, Boston, MA
- California Museum of Photography, University of California at Riverside, CA
- Center for Creative Photography, University of Arizona, Tucson, AZ
- Illinois State Museum, Springfield, IL
- Radcliffe Institute for Advanced Study, Harvard University, Cambridge, MA
- Rose Art Museum], Brandeis University, Waltham, MA
- State of Illinois Center Permanent Collection, Chicago, IL
- Trustman Art Gallery, Simmons College, Boston, MA
- University Art Museum, State University of New York at Binghamton, NY
- Victoria and Albert Museum, London
