= Diva Book of Short Stories =

2001 anthology edited by Helen Sandler

- Author: Helen Sandler
- Publication date: April 1, 2001
- ISBN: 978-1-873741-47-4

The Diva Book of Short Stories (2001) and its successor Groundswell: The Second Diva Book of Short Stories (2002) are anthologies of fictional short stories about lesbian, gay, bisexual, and transgender people.

The Diva Book of Short Stories, edited by Helen Sandler, was the first book in the series. It was critically well-received, winning the 2002 Lambda Literary Award for fictional anthology.
