= Michael G. Cornelius =

American scholar

Michael G. Cornelius is an American scholar specialising in early British literature and an author.

== Background ==
Michael Cornelius was raised in Summerhill, New York. After receiving a bachelor's degree at St. John Fisher College and a master's at Marshall University, he completed a PhD in medieval literature at the University of Rhode Island. Subsequently, Cornelius joined Wilson College - a liberal arts women's college in Pennsylvania - in 2002, where he currently holds the post of Chair of the Department of English and Mass Communications. He is openly gay. He now lives in Chambersburg with his partner, Joe.

== Career ==
=== Professor ===
Cornelius has been published in a number of journals, including Fifteenth-Century Studies, Studies in Medieval and Renaissance Teaching, The Delta Epsilon Sigma Journal, and SCOTIA: A Journal of Scottish Studies. An article he wrote on Geoffrey Chaucer's ploughman appeared in the anthology Black Earth, Ivory Tower, and he has completed a manuscript on Edward II.

Although he specializes in early British literature, he has also taught on the structure of the English language, Christopher Marlowe, Robert Burns, and gay and lesbian literature. He runs a creative writing course at Wilson College, and was named a Pennsylvania Humanities Council scholar for 2006–2007, specialising in horror cinema.

=== Writer ===
In 2001, Cornelius (as "Michael G. Cornelius") published his first novel, Creating Man. A story of God's accidental creation of human emotions on the eighth day, told through a number of tales about gay men, the novel was a finalist at the 2002 Lambda Literary Awards, and was nominated for both an Independent Press Award and an American Library Association Award.

Two years later, in 2003, he co-authored (with Kate Emburg) the first of the Susan Slutt - Girl Detective novels, a parody of Nancy Drew-style works.

In 2007, Cornelius released his third novel - The Ascension - a religious-themed horror story.

He has also published short fiction in various journals, magazines, and anthologies, including Velvet Mafia, The Egg Box, Futures Mystery Anthology Magazine, The Spillway Review, and Encore, as well as in anthologies from Alyson Press and StarPress Books.

== Works ==
- Creating Man (Vineyard Press, 2000) ISBN 1-930067-03-8
- Susan Slutt - Girl Detective (with Kate Emburg) (Vineyard Press, 2003) ISBN 1-930067-30-5
- The Ascension: A Novel (Breakneck Books, 2007) ISBN 0-9786551-5-X
