= D. A. Miller =

American literary critic and film scholar

D. A. Miller (born 1948) is an American literary critic and film scholar. He is John F. Hotchkis Professor Emeritus and former Professor of the Graduate School in the Department of English at the University of California, Berkeley.

== Education and teaching ==
He received his B.A. in English (1970) and his PhD in Comparative Literature (1977) at Yale University. He also holds an M.A. from the University of Cambridge (1976). He taught English and Comparative Literature at UC Berkeley (1977–2000), Harvard University (2000–2004), and Columbia University (2004–2011) before returning to UC Berkeley, where he was a member of the English Department until 2014. In 2017, he was a Visiting Professor at the University of Tokyo, Japan, and frequently lectures in that country. In 2013, he was elected to the American Academy of Arts and Sciences.

== Overview of major works ==
Miller's work has been influential in a wide range of fields in literary and cultural studies, including narrative theory, the history of the novel, film studies, and gay studies.

In his early work, Miller examined the cultural and ideological work of the nineteenth-century novel in English and French. Influenced by structuralism and centered on novels by Jane Austen, George Eliot and Stendhal, Narrative and Its Discontents: Problems of Closure in the Traditional Novel (1981) considered the novel form's fraught relationship to the social and ethical principles that it purports to convey. Miller argued that these closure-promoting principles belie the openness required by traditional narrative itself, defined as both “a quest after that which will end questing” and “an interruption of what will be resumed.”

Miller's The Novel and the Police (1988) drew on the writing and teaching of Michel Foucault to consider the novel's setting to work as a technology of discipline. "Disciplinary power," Miller wrote, "constitutively mobilizes a tactic of tact: it is the policing power that never passes for such, but is either invisible or visible only under cover of other, nobler or simply blander intentionalities (to educate, to cure, to produce, to defend)." Miller's book thus countered critical celebrations of the novel as inherently emancipatory. (Indeed, The Novel and the Police exposed these celebrations as "perpetuating the [novel’s] ruse".) Against this "subversion hypothesis", Miller called for attention to the novel's ability effectively to produce subjects, its capacity to form "a subject habituated to psychic displacements, evacuations, reinvestments, in a social order whose totalizing power circulates all the more easily for being pulverized".

In "Anal Rope" (1990), his definitive reading of Alfred Hitchcock’s 1948 film Rope, and in his next books, Bringing Out Roland Barthes (1992) and Place for Us: Essay on the Broadway Musical (1998), Miller turned to more explicitly gay-themed works, even while insisting on the importance of the implicit in mainstream culture’s representations and disavowals of homosexuality.

"Anal Rope" treated, among other things, the role of connotation in such representations and disavowals. Redressing film criticism’s refusal to acknowledge the homosexuality of Hitchcock’s protagonists (inspired by Leopold and Loeb), Miller argued that the celebrated technique that had been film critics’ exclusive and obsessive focus was informed by and inseparable from the threat posed by gay male sexuality. Like Miller's later essays on homosexuality and mainstream cinema—"Visual Pleasure in 1959" (1997), "On the Universality of Brokeback Mountain" (2007), and "Elio's Education" (2018)—"Anal Rope" maintained that this threat was not marginal, but rather "central" to the making and maintenance of heterosexual identity. The critical reception of Rope, like that of Suddenly, Last Summer and Brokeback Mountain, allowed Miller to locate "a homosexual closet constructed for heterosexual use, for the indulgence, in other words, of a homosexual fantasy that we must understand as not the peculiar coinage of the gay male brain, but the common, even central daydream of the normal world" ("Visual Pleasure in 1959").

At once "openly autobiographical" and programmatically "novelesque", Bringing Out Roland Barthes responded to this fantasy in kind, with a fantasy of its own. Miller wrote that it "had come to interest [him] to know that Barthes – or any man for that matter – was gay" only because "such information broached to fantasy the possibility of alleviating an erotic pessimism by producing with him, against him, a sexuality that had become ‘ours.’" Miller’s tribute to Barthes thus anticipated Place for Us in its desire and determination to elaborate, without romanticizing, "gay community".

Set in three differently communal spaces that were also "hiding places" – named in the chapter titles, "In the Basement", "At the Bar", and "On Broadway" – Miller's study of the Broadway musical further complicated the theory of the closet as "Open Secret" that Miller had first put forward in The Novel and the Police and had continued to unfold in Bringing Out Roland Barthes. Place for Us shared The Novel and the Police's suspicion of emancipatory narratives and Bringing Out Roland Barthes's refusal of the politics of "gay avowal". The path of that Miller traced in Place for Us, from the family basement to Broadway, thus entailed significant losses as well as gains. Against easy assimilationist pieties, Miller claimed that "the featuring of homosexuals on the Broadway stage – even ones amicably drawn to our type – works positively against the recognition of homosexual desire that diffuses through ‘other’ subjects, objects, relations, all over the [musical] form. Indeed, by the contrary application of the same cruel logic, Gypsy and its closeted kind can now seem to have rendered a far richer account of this desire than anything we are likely to owe to a counter-tradition of gay avowal. After all, who that saw the closet at work on the musical stage, least of all ourselves, failed to witness this double operation: not only of ‘hiding’ homosexual desire, but also of manifesting, across all manner of landscapes, an extensive network of hiding places — call them latencies — apparently ready-made for the purpose? To perceive the closet was always also to perceive the multitude of conditions under which closeting was possible, to glimpse, even as it was being denied, the homosexual disposition of the world. No doubt we like La Cage [aux Folles] and its meager progeny even less for obliging us to admit, to our confusion, how keenly we miss this sublime vision, though it may have been the only truth that the closet's mendacity ever told."

Returning to Austen in "Austen’s Attitude" (1995) and especially Jane Austen, or the Secret of Style (2003), Miller remained interested in the possibilities afforded by effacement. Noting that "the realism of her works allows no one like Jane Austen to appear in them", Miller argued that Austen's omniscient, disembodied and widely celebrated (successful) narrator emerges to compensate, if only partially, for the unmarried (and thus "failed") author's oppression by "the conjugal imperative": "Behind the glory of style’s willed evacuation of substance lies the ignominy of a subject’s hopelessly insufficient social realization, just as behind style’s ahistorical impersonality lies the historical impasse of someone whose social representation doubles for social humiliation." "For all along," Miller wrote later in Jane Austen, "shame has been style’s encrypted alter ego—its alternate form as ego—and style, the unremitting labor of managing and masking this encryption."

Questions of style and of its relationship to shame were also at the center of Miller's next book-length work, an essay on Federico Fellini's 8½. Framed as a response to critics’ complaints about Fellini's having (like his director-protagonist) "nothing to say" – complaints, that is, about the auteur's "self-indulgence" and the film's lack of substance and legible "social engagement" – Miller's 8½ contended that the film mapped out "two ways": "In one direction lies the man, marked out by his fearful shortage of being and meaning; in the other lies style, which never acknowledges, unless it be to destroy, any order besides its own to which it is required to be sufficient. In the man, substance is inchoate, inadequate to the desired form; it is a drag on everything. In style, substance loses any such power of pressure, dissolving into a play of movement and light; marks of dishonor, feelings of shame, behaviors of abashment—these suddenly have no more pertinence than the rules of a schoolmarm in the Wild West, or the laws of a nation in a foreign embassy." These two ways formed, according to Miller, "the basis for the social engagement that 8½ is not widely supposed to have". Miller continued, "The self-declared irresponsibility of Fellini’s style announces not a lapse to be deplored, but an intention to be understood. For every 'strong' style — I mean one, like Fellini’s, of blatantly insufficient substance — marks a refusal to come to terms with a world whose social organization it lets us perceive, in specific ways as intolerable. More: every such style mounts a positive offensive against this organization, an offensive that, if we choose to understand it, makes the familiar unmasking of style as "denial" look like a kind of denial itself."

In his typically dialectical way, Miller thus made the case for Fellini’s (Barthesian) "nothing to say", and for the continued relevance of 8½’s programmatic irrelevance. For Miller, Fellini’s style, like Austen’s, capitalized on a condition of scarcity and turned blatant insufficiency to profit; this style combined negative refusal with "positive offensive" and derived strength from weakness.

Throughout his career, Miller has been a committed practitioner of close reading. In Hidden Hitchcock (2016), he models one form of the method by occupying the position of the "too-close viewer"—a scrutinizing spectator attuned to supposed continuity errors and seemingly trivial details rather than narrative—and uncovers an unnoticed cameo by the director in The Wrong Man. In his recent studies of Austen and Hitchcock, including Hidden Hitchcock, he has also explicitly defended close reading as an analytical practice. However, these defenses have been anything but triumphalist, and have instead sought to derive strength from weakness, or at least from untimeliness. As Miller writes in Jane Austen, or The Secret of Style, close reading has long since fallen into disfavor, but this is not a fall to be straightforwardly lamented: "it is close reading in its humbled, futile, ‘minoritized’ state that would win my preference in any contest. For only when close reading has lost its respectability, has ceased to be the slave of mere convenience, can it come out as a thing that, even under the high-minded (but now kitchy-sounding) rationales of its former mission, it had always been: an almost infantile desire to be close period, as close as one can get, without literal plagiarism, to merging with the mother-text. (In an essay once, citing the first sentence of Pride and Prejudice, I left out the quotation marks.)" Miller’s parenthesis marks his love for and affinity with Austen, and his references to "the mother-text" and a coming out into "infantile desire" call Miller's Barthes to memory: "far from having the sense to be ashamed of his prolonged dependency", this critic "shares with, say, the clone whose much different body is devoted to signaling its various sexual availabilities this common refusal: of the desirability, even the possibility, of the male body’s autonomy" (Bringing Out Roland Barthes). Likewise, for Miller, "[t]he adept in close reading must assert an autonomy of which he must also continually betray the weak and easily overwhelmed defenses." Closely linked to intimacy, Miller's close reading in this way implies an ethics and even a politics.

== Selected publications ==
Books

- Second Time Around: From Art House to DVD, Columbia University Press, 2021.
- Hidden Hitchcock, Chicago: University of Chicago Press, 2016.
- 8½, Houndmills: Palgrave Macmillan [BFI Film Classics], 2008; French translation, 2011.
- Jane Austen, or The Secret of Style, Princeton, NJ: Princeton University Press, 2003.
- Place for Us: Essay on the Broadway Musical, Cambridge: Harvard University Press, 1998.
- Bringing Out Roland Barthes, Berkeley and Los Angeles: University of California Press, 1992.
- The Novel and the Police, Berkeley and Los Angeles: University of California Press, 1988.
- Narrative and its Discontents: Problems of Closure in the Traditional Novel, Princeton, NJ: Princeton University Press, 1981.
