= Marilyn Reynolds =

American children's book writer (born 1935)

Marilyn Reynolds (born September 13, 1935) is an American author specialising in young adult fiction.

== Biography ==
A native of southern California, in 1965, Reynolds earned a Bachelor of Arts in English from California State University and, in 1967, a California Lifetime Teaching Credential. In 1971 she earned a Master of Science degree in Reading Education from Pepperdine University. In addition to writing books and personal essays, Reynolds provides workshops for writers and teachers.

Reynolds is the author of ten books in the award-winning True-to-Life Series from Hamilton High. Her books cover sensitive topics, including teen pregnancy, molestation, rape and issues of gender identity. Her book, I Won’t Read and You Can’t Make Me: Reaching Reluctant Teen Readers is a compilation of practical strategies and techniques developed over decades of teaching low level readers. Her most recent book is a collection of personal essays, Over 70 and I Don't Mean MPH: Reflections on the Gift of Longevity. She is currently at work on Til Death or Dementia Do Us Part, the story of her journey with her husband as he sank more and more deeply into the abyss of Frontotemporal Dementia.

Because of the true-to-life portrayal of sensitive subjects in the Hamilton High series, Reynolds’ books are sometimes challenged by those who want teens to be protected from life's harsh realities. In 2005, Detour for Emmy was on the American Library Association's Top Ten Banned Books list.

== Awards ==
Several of the Hamilton High series books have been included in the American Library Association's "Best Books for Young Adults," including Too Soon For Jeff and Detour for Emmy and "Best Books for Reluctant Readers." Detour for Emmy received the South Carolina Young Adult Book Award in 1996. Love Rules was a finalist both for a Lambda award and the Benjamin Franklin Award. Six of her books have been given the New York Public Library's designation "Best Books for the Teen Age"

== Adaptations ==
In 1996, Reynolds’ novel, Too Soon for Jeff, was adapted as an ABC Afterschool Special starring Freddie Prinze, Jr. and Jessica Alba. In 1997, Reynolds and her Too Soon for Jeff script-writing partner, Karen Kasaba, were nominated for a Daytime Emmy Award for Outstanding Writing in a Children's Special. They were also given a Nancy Susan Reynolds Award for the writing.

== Novels ==
=== True-to-Life Series From Hamilton High School ===
1. Detour for Emmy
2. Too Soon for Jeff
3. Beyond Dreams
4. Telling
5. But What About Me
6. Baby Help
7. If You Loved Me
8. Love Rules
9. No More Sad Goodbyes
10. Shut Up!

== Non-Fiction ==
1. I Won’t Read and You Can’t Make Me: Reaching Reluctant Teen Readers
2. Over 70 and I Don't Mean MPH: Reflections on the Gift of Longevity
