= Michael Schiefelbein =

American pastor and science fiction writer

Michael Schiefelbein (born 1957 in Kansas) is an American pastor in the United Church of Christ and a writer of science fiction. His novels have twice been finalists for the Lambda Literary Award for Science Fiction, Fantasy and Horror.

== Personal life ==
Schiefelbein grew up in Topeka, Kansas.

He spent the first thirty years of his life following Catholicism, including a decade during which he trained to become a Catholic priest. He stopped training when he accepted his identity as a gay man.

While in Memphis teaching at Christian Brothers University, Schiefelbein joined the United Church of Christ, a Protestant denomination more accepting of Schiefelbein's sexuality.

Schiefelbein later moved to Modesto, California and became the pastor of College Avenue Congregational Church.

Schiefelbein is married to Steve Klinkerman.

== Education ==
In preparation for the priesthood, Schiefelbein attended Savior of the World Seminary, a high school in Kansas City, Kansas. After graduation, he continued seminary studies at Catholic University of America in Washington, D.C. and then at the Gregorian University in Rome. He left the seminary before ordination when he accepted his identity as a gay man. Schiefelbein then received a Doctor of Philosophy in English from the University of Maryland.

While in Memphis teaching at Christian Brothers University, Schiefelbein joined the United Church of Christ, a Protestant denomination that was more accepting of Schiefelbein's sexuality. In 2006, he received a Master of Divinity from the Memphis Theological Seminary and became an ordained minister.

== Career ==
In the 1990s, Schiefelbein became a professor of English in the literature and languages department of Christian Brothers University (CBU) in Memphis, Tennessee.

While teaching at CBU, Schiefelbein published his first novel, Vampire Vow, which was later followed by three more vampire novels. The books take place during the time of Jesus's life and have homosexuality as a major theme.

Together with his spouse, Schiefelbein created and led Pilgrim House, "an intentional residential community in Memphis, which practiced simple living and offered shelter to people in need."

=== Awards ===
Awards and honors for Schiefelbein's writing
	Title	Award/Honor	Result
2002	Vampire Vow	Lambda Literary Award for Science Fiction, Fantasy and Horror	Finalist
2004	Vampire Thrall	Lambda Literary Award for Science Fiction, Fantasy and Horror	Finalist

=== Publications ===
  The Lure of Babylon: Seven Protestant Novelists and Britain's Roman Catholic Revival (2001)

- Blood Brothers (2002)
- Body and Blood (2008)

==== Vampires series ====
- Vampire Vow (2001)
- Vampire Thrall (2003)
- Vampire Transgression (2007)
- Vampire Maker (2010)
