= Randy Boyd (writer) =

American novelist

- Born: 1962 (age 63–64); Indianapolis, Indiana, U.S.
- Education: University of California, Los Angeles
- Occupations: Novelist; essayist

Randy Boyd (born 1962) is an American novelist and essayist. His writings explore the intersections of race and sexuality, pulling from his experience as a black gay man who is HIV-positive.

== Early life ==
Boyd was born in 1962 in Indianapolis, Indiana, the youngest of four children. His college education started at the University of Southern California, but he later transferred to the University of California, Los Angeles, where he studied sociology and graduated in 1985. Before writing full-time, Boyd worked in broadcast promotion in Hollywood.

He tested positive for HIV in 1988 and became an outspoken activist against HIV stigma. "It should not be socially acceptable to use words like 'clean' when describing someone who is HIV-negative," he was quoted as saying in the Bay Area Recorder, "It would also help if gay people today understood more about what gay people with HIV/AIDS had to endure during the AIDS panic. In some ways, longtime survivors are like Holocaust survivors or veterans of a war. Have some sensitivity to our plight, for goodness sake."

== Literary career ==
His novels include Bridge Across the Ocean (2000), Uprising (2001), The Devil Inside (2002), and Walt Loves the Bearcat (2005). Uprising was a finalist for the Lambda Literary Award for Gay Mystery.

Of his fiction work, Boyd wrote, "My novels are like my kids. I’m happy with the way they turned out. Each novel is piece of myself set forth into the world, a reflection of my dreams, a part of my soul. The main perspective is that of a black gay man living with HIV/AIDS. Go figure."

He founded West Beach books to publish his works as well as others.

== Selected list of works ==
- Bridge Across the Ocean (2000)
- Uprising: The Suspense Thriller (2001)
- The Devil Inside: The Suspense Thriller (2002)
- Walt Loves the Bearcat (2005)
- The Essential Randy Boyd, Volume 1 (2017)
- Hostage: A Short Story (2017)
- Ovulation Night: A Short Story (2017)
