= Erika Lopez =

American cartoonist, novelist, and performance artist

- Born: 1968 (age 57–58); New York City, New York, U.S.
- Occupations: Novelist, Cartoonist, Performance Artist
- Writing career
- Notable works: Flaming Iguanas, They Call Me Mad Dog!, Hoochie Mama
- Website: www.erikalopez.com

Erika Lopez (born 1968) is an American cartoonist, novelist, and performance artist. Lopez has published six books or more and has internationally achieved her performance art. She is of Puerto Rican descent who has published six books and speaks openly of her bisexuality. She lives in San Francisco, California.

== Life and education ==
Erika Lopez was born in New York City, New York and is the daughter of two civil rights activists, a Puerto Rican father, Rafael Lopez-Sanchez; and a German-American mother, Deborah Reese. Both of her parents converted to Quaker and she was raised attending Quaker meetings. During early childhood she was raised in Philadelphia, while her parents were still married. During most of her high school years, her parents divorced and she lived with her mother and her mother's lesbian partner, the family was often moving.

Lopez attended the Pennsylvania Academy of the Fine Arts in Philadelphia, and also studied at Moore College of Art and Design and the University of the Arts. She moved to San Francisco, California in 1994.

== Novels ==
As a struggling artist, Lopez applied for and received grants from the Ludwig Vogelstein Foundation and the Pennsylvania Council on the Arts, each of which gave her $2500 to write. A cross-country motorcycle trip served as inspiration for her first illustrated novel, Flaming Iguanas (1997), which includes numerous images made with rubber stamps and was published by Simon & Schuster. That same year she published a book of cartoon stories called Lap Dancing for Mommy. Lopez went on to publish two additional illustrated novels with Simon & Schuster, They Call Me Mad Dog! (1998) and Hoochie Mama: The Other White Meat (2001) before her relationship with Simon & Schuster's publisher, David Rosenthal, soured (they've since kissed and made up and are actually friends, as she now refers to Rosenthal as her "maker" for letting her have her way with her career right away, making her the "megalomaniacal monster" she says she is today). These three books form a trilogy of very-loosely autobiographical novels which describe the exploits of "Tomato Rodríguez" (Lopez has stated that the novels are not autobiographical, but that there are intersections between her life and the experiences of Tomato).

After a stint on welfare, and while touring her show, Lopez decided that the people in the suits didn't know how to run the arts industries, or the country's economy, and so she decided to take her fate into her own hands and become a "mini-mogul." Along with James Swanson, Kamala Lopez, and Jeffrey Hicken, they started a book publishing company, Monster Girl Media to go along with Monster Girl Movies, as a part of their coalition of Do-it-Yourself businesses in charge of their own development, production, merchandising, and promotion. Their first publication is "The Girl Must Die: A Monster Girl Memoir" (2010) along with the matching, "The Girl Must Die: 18 Postcards."

They work with a rotating roster of other Monster Girls Mujers and Men like Alison Penton Harper, Bianca Laureano, Kate Gottli, Suzanne Rush, and Peter Maravelis.

== Performance art ==
Lopez is best known for the performance art characters of “Grandma Lopez” and "The Welfare Queen" which she created after she began to receive welfare after her fight with Simon & Schuster. These characters are at the heart of Lopez's performance piece Nothing Left but the Smell: A Republican on Welfare, which she has performed at locations as varied as San Francisco (California), New York City, Edinburgh (Scotland), London and Manchester (England), and Oslo (Norway). The text of this performance piece has been published in a self-edited artist edition and is also available online.

In April 2004, Flaming Iguanas was presented onstage at Theatre Rhino in the Mission District of San Francisco.

== Published works ==
- I Love You Like a Sister Said Erika Lopez. San Francisco: Erika Lopez, 1995.
- Lap Dancing for Mommy: Tender Stories of Disgust, Blame and Inspiration. Seattle: Seal Press, 1997. ISBN 1-878067-96-6
- Flaming Iguanas: An Illustrated All-Girl Road Novel Thing. New York: Simon and Schuster, 1997. ISBN 0-684-83722-6
- They Call Me Mad Dog!: A Story for Bitter, Lonely People. New York: Simon and Schuster, 1998. ISBN 0-684-84941-0
- Hoochie Mama: La otra carne blanca (The Other White Meat). New York: Simon and Schuster, 2001. ISBN 0-684-86974-8
- Grandma López's Country-Mad Fried Chicken Book. Nothing Left But the Smell: A Republican on Welfare. San Francisco: Tiny-Fisted Book Publishers, 2003.
- The Girl Must Die: A Monster Girl Memoir. Monster Girl Media, 2010. ISBN 0-9844014-0-7

== See also ==
- LGBT literature
- List of Puerto Ricans
- List of gay, lesbian or bisexual people
- List of LGBT writers
- List of Puerto Rican writers
- Puerto Rican literature
- Puerto Ricans in the United States
