= Perry Brass =

American author, journalist, playwright and essayist (born 1947)

- Born: Perry Brass; September 15, 1947 (age 78); Savannah, Georgia, U.S.
- Education: New York University
- Occupations: Author, journalist
- Writing career
- Genres: Novel, essay
- Notable works: The Manly Art of Seduction: How to Meet, Talk to, and Become Intimate With Anyone
- Website: perrybrass.com

Perry Brass (born September 15, 1947) is an American author, journalist, playwright and essayist.

He was an active member of the Gay Liberation Front, the first radical gay organization to be formed after the Stonewall Rebellion in New York in June 1969. He co-edited Come Out!, the influential newspaper published by the Gay Liberation Front; the last three issues of the newspaper were published by the newspaper's collective from his apartment in Hell's Kitchen in New York. In 1971, with two friends, he co-founded the Gay Men's Health Project Clinic, the first clinic for gay men on the East Coast. The clinic openly advocated for gay men to use condoms, almost a decade before the advent of AIDS.

He writes for The Huffington Post. Perry Brass is member of the PEN American Center. The New York Public Library has a Manuscripts section with Perry Brass holdings.

He has been a finalist for six Lambda Literary Awards. In 2012 King of Angels was a finalist for the Ferro-Grumley Award from New York's Ferro-Grumley Foundation.

In March 2016, Brass was banned from Facebook.

== Major literary work ==
- (1991) Sex-charge, Belhue Press
- (1992) Mirage, Belhue Press
- (1992) Works and Other "Smoky George" Stories, Belhue Press
- (1993) Circles, Belhue Press
- (1994) Out There, Belhue Press
- (1995) Albert or The Book of Man, Belhue Press
- (1997) The Harvest, Belhue Press
- (1998) The Lover of My Soul, Belhue Press
- (1999) How to Survive Your Own Gay Life, Belhue Press
- (2000) Angel Lust, Belhue Press
- (2001) Warlock, Belhue Press
- (2004) The Substance of God, Belhue Press
- (2007) Carnal Sacraments, Belhue Press
- (2010) The Manly Art of Seduction, Belhue Press
- (2012) King of Angels, Belhue Press
- (2015) The Manly Pursuit of Desire and Love, Belhue Press
