= Michael Thomas Ford =

American author (born 1968)

- Born: October 1, 1968 (age 58)
- Writing career
- Period: 1990s–present
- Notable works: Alec Baldwin Doesn't Love Me, That's Mr. Faggot to You, Last Summer, Changing Tides, What We Remember
- Website: www.michaelthomasford.com

Michael Thomas Ford (born October 1, 1968) is an American author of primarily gay-themed literature. He is best known for his "My Queer Life" series of comedic essay collections and for his award-winning novels Last Summer, Looking for It, Full Circle, Changing Tides, and What We Remember.

Michael Thomas Ford is the author of more than fifty books for both young readers and adults. He is best known for his best-selling novels Last Summer, Looking for It, and Full Circle and for his five essay collections in the "Trials of My Queer Life" series. His work has been nominated for eleven Lambda Literary Awards, twice winning for Best Humor Book and twice for Best Romance Novel. He was also nominated for a Horror Writers Association Bram Stoker Award (for his novel The Dollhouse That Time Forgot) and a Gaylactic Spectrum Award (for his short story "Night of the Were Puss").

== Career ==
=== 1990s ===
Ford began his writing career in 1992 with the publication of 100 Questions & Answers about AIDS: What You Need to Know Now (Macmillan), one of the first books about the AIDS crisis for young adults. Named an American Library Association Best Book for Young Adults, the book became a widely used resource in HIV education programs for young people and was translated into more than a dozen languages.

The follow-up to that book, The Voices of AIDS (William Morrow, 1995), was a collection of interviews with people whose lives have been affected by the AIDS crisis.

Ford's next book, 1996's The World Out There: Becoming Part of the Lesbian and Gay Community (The New Press), was a handbook for people coming out and wanting to know what it means to be part of the queer world. It earned him his first Lambda Literary Award nomination in the YA category.

1998 saw the release of two books, the first being Out Spoken (William Morrow), a collection of interviews with gay and lesbian people that was again aimed at young adults. Ford's second book to come out that year was Alec Baldwin Doesn't Love Me (Alyson Books), the first of what has come to be known as the "Trials of My Queer Life" series. The book received a Lambda Literary Award for Best Humor Book, winning out over titles by lesbian comic Kate Clinton, columnist Dan Savage, and cartoonist Alison Bechdel.

In 1998 he began recording his weekly radio show for the Gay BC Radio Network.

=== 2000s ===
The third in the "Trials of My Queer Life" series, It's Not Mean If It's True (Alyson Books), was published in 2000.

An audio recording. My Queer Life (Fluid Words), in which Ford read pieces from his three essay collections, was released in 2000. The recording also contained two songs from "Alec Baldwin Doesn't Love Me," a musical project for which Ford wrote the lyrics and performed the narration.

In December 2000 Ford published Paths of Faith: Conversations about Religion and Spirituality (Simon & Schuster). Written for ages 12 up, the book was a collection of interviews with leaders from a range of spiritual traditions.

This Queer Life, a stage production written by Ford, premiered at the Loring Playhouse in Minneapolis in 2002.

== Works ==
=== Adult Novels ===
- Last Summer (2003), Kensington Books
- Looking For It (2004), Kensington Books
- Full Circle (2006)
- Changing Tides (2007)
- Jane Bites Back (2009), Ballantine
- What We Remember (2009), Kensington Books
- The Road Home (2010), Kensington Books

=== Novellas and Short Stories ===
- "Night of the Werepussy" (2002), included in Queer Fear II
- Sting (2003), included in the book Masters of Midnight
- Midnight Thirsts (2004), Kensington Books

=== Young Adult Novels ===
- Suicide Notes (2008), HarperCollins
- "Every Star That Falls" (2023), Sequel to Suicide Notes

=== Nonfiction ===
- 100 Questions & Answers about AIDS: What You Need to Know Now (1992), Macmillan
- The Voices of AIDS (1995), William Morrow
- The World Out There: Becoming Part of the Lesbian and Gay Community (1996), The New Press
- Out Spoken (1998), William Morrow
- Paths of Faith: Conversations about Religion and Spirituality (2000), Simon & Schuster
- Ultimate Gay Sex (2004)
- The Path of the Green Man: Gay Men, Wicca, and Living a Magical Life (2005), Citadel Press

=== Collections and Essays ===
- Alec Baldwin Doesn't Love Me (1998), Alyson Books
- That's Mr. Faggot to You (1999), Alyson Books
- It's Not Mean If It's True (2000), Alyson Books
- The Little Book of Neuroses (2001)
- My Big, Fat, Queer Life (2003)

== Awards ==
- The Voices of AIDS (1995) National Science Teachers Association-Children's Book Council Outstanding Science Trade Book for Children; Booklist magazine Editors' Choice
- The World Out There: Becoming Part of the Lesbian and Gay Community (1996): Firecracker Alternative Book Award nomination
- Out Spoken (1998): National Council of Social Studies-Children's Book Council Notable Children's Book in the field of Social Studies; Booklist magazine "Top of the List" selection
- Paths of Faith: Conversations about Religion and Spirituality (2000): Booklist magazine Top 10 Religion Book of the Year; Booklist Editors' Choice "Top of the List" selection for YA Nonfiction; New York Public Library Book for the Teen Age.
- "Night of the Werepussy" (2002), was nominated for a Gaylactic Spectrum Award for best short fiction.

=== American Library Association Best Book for Young Adults ===
- 100 Questions & Answers about AIDS: What You Need to Know Now (won, 1992)
- The Voices of AIDS (won, 1995)

=== Lambda Literary Award ===
- The World Out There: Becoming Part of the Lesbian and Gay Community (nominated for the Young Adult category, 1996)
- Alec Baldwin Doesn't Love Me (won Best Humor, 1998)
- Out Spoken (nominated for the Young Adult category, 1998)
- That's Mr. Faggot to You (won Best Humor, 1999)
- It's Not Mean If It's True (nominated for Best Humor, 2000)
- The Little Book of Neuroses (nominated, 2002)
- Masters of Midnight (nominated, 2003)
- My Big, Fat, Queer Life (nominated, 2003)
- What We Remember (won Gay Men's Mystery, 2009)

== Additional sources ==
Day, Frances Ann (2000). Lesbian and Gay Voices: An Annotated Bibliography and Guide to Literature for Children and Young Adults. Greenwood Press. pp. 188–190. ISBN 0-313-31162-5. pages 191–193.
