= 19th Lambda Literary Awards =

2007 literary awards ceremony

The 19th Lambda Literary Awards were held in 2007, to honour works of LGBT literature published in 2006.

== Special awards ==
Category	Winner
Pioneer Award	Martin Duberman, Marijane Meaker

== Nominees and winners ==
Category	Winner	Nominated
Bisexual Literature	Michael Szymanski and Nicole Kristal, The Bisexual's Guide to the Universe	Serena Anderlini-D'Onofrio, Eros; Ronald C. Fox, Affirmative Psychotherapy with Bisexual Women & Bisexual Men; Clarence Nero, Three Sides to Every Story; Ron Jackson Suresha, Bi Guys; Ron Jackson Suresha and Pete Chvany, Bi Men
Gay Debut Fiction	Robert Westfield, Suspension	Martin Hyatt, A Scarecrow’s Bible; Alex MacLennan, The Zookeeper; Patrick Ryan, Send Me; Timothy Williams, 5 Minutes and 42 Seconds
Gay Erotica	Jeff Mann, A History of Barbed Wire	Richard Labonté and Timothy J. Lambert, Best Gay Erotica 2007; Zavo, Hot On His Trail
Gay Fiction	Robert Westfield, Suspension	Lisa Carey, Every Visible Thing; Neal Drinnan, Izzy and Eve; Stephen McCauley, Alternatives to Sex; Tom Spanbauer, Now Is the Hour
Gay Memoir/Biography	Bernard Cooper, The Bill From My Father	Alan Bennett, Untold Stories; Patrick Moore, Tweaked; Kim Powers, The History of Swimming; Jonathan Silin, My Father’s Keeper
Gay Mystery	Garry Ryan, The Lucky Elephant Restaurant	Greg Herren, Mardi Gras Mambo; Josh Lanyon, The Hell You Say; James Lear, The Back Passage; Randall Peffer, Provincetown Follies, Bangkok Blues
Gay Poetry	Jim Elledge, A History of My Tattoo	Justin Chin, Gutted; Jeffrey Conway, The Album That Changed My Life; Rigoberto González, Other Fugitives & Other Strangers; Dwaine Rieves, When the Eye Forms
Gay Romance	Rob Byrnes, When the Stars Come Out	Timothy James Beck, Someone Like You; Lawrence Schimel, Two Boys in Love; Scott & Scott, Surf ‘N Turf; Andy Zeffer, Going Down in La-La Land
Lesbian Debut Fiction	Ellis Avery, The Teahouse Fire	Kirsten Dinnall Hoyte, Black Marks; Ana-Maurine Lara, Erzulie’s Skirt; Leslie Larson, Slipstream; Peggy Munson, Origami Striptease
Lesbian Erotica	Laurinda D. Brown, Walk Like a Man	Rachel Kramer Bussel, ed., Glamour Girls; Karin Kallmaker, 18th & Castro; Midori, Master Han’s Daughter; Tristan Taormino and Emma Donoghue, eds., Best Lesbian Erotica 2007
Lesbian Fiction	Sarah Waters, The Night Watch	J. D. Glass, Punk Like Me; Leslie Larson, Slipstream; Sheila Ortiz Taylor, Outrageous; Michelle Tea, Rose of No Man’s Land
Lesbian Memoir/Biography	Alison Bechdel, Fun Home	Bettina Aptheker, Intimate Politics; Hilary Carlip, Queen of the Oddballs; Catherine Friend, Hit by a Farm; Barbara Sjoholm, Incognito Street
Lesbian Mystery	Laurie R. King, The Art of Detection	Rose Beecham, Sleep of Reason; Ellen Hart, Night Vision; Joan Opyr, Idaho Code; Jessica Thomas, The Weekend Visitor
Lesbian Poetry	Sina Queyras, Lemon Hound	Robin Becker, Domain of Perfect Affection; Cheryl Clarke, Days of Good Looks; Juliet Patterson, The Truant Lover; Nathalie Stephens, Touch to Affliction
Lesbian Romance	Georgia Beers, Fresh Tracks	Ronica Black, Wild Abandon; Karin Kallmaker, Finders Keepers; Grace Lennox, Chance; Radclyffe, Turn Back Time
LGBT Anthology	Greg Herren and Paul J. Willis, eds., Love, Bourbon Street: Reflections of New Orleans	Harlyn Aizley, Confessions of the Other Mother; Ted Gideonse and Rob Williams, From Boys to Men; Toby Johnson and Steve Berman, Charmed Lives; Catherine Lake and Nairne Holtz, No Margins: Writing Canadian Fiction in Lesbian
LGBT Arts and Culture	Lillian Faderman and Stuart Timmons, Gay L. A.: A History of Sexual Outlaws, Power Politics and Lipstick Lesbians	Alison Bechdel, Fun Home; Sergio de la Mora, Cinemachismo; Jennifer Doyle, Sex Objects; Ernest Hardy, Blood Beats: Vol 1
LGBT Children's/Young Adult	David Levithan and Billy Merrell, eds., Full Spectrum; Julie Anne Peters, Between Mom and Jo	Christian Burch, The Manny Files; Brian Sloan, Tale of Two Summers; Kim Wallace, Erik & Isabelle’s Junior Year at Foresthill High
LGBT Drama	Tim Miller, 1001 Beds	Victor Bumbalo, Questa; Steven Fales, Confessions of a Mormon Boy
LGBT Humor	Joe Keenan, My Lucky Star	Hilary Carlip, Queen of the Oddballs; Ralf König, Roy & Al
LGBT Non-Fiction	Lillian Faderman and Stuart Timmons, Gay L. A.: A History of Sexual Outlaws, Power Politics and Lipstick Lesbians; Marcia M. Gallo, Different Daughters	Kate Bornstein, Hello, Cruel World; James T. Sears, Behind the Mask of the Mattachine; Brian Whitaker, Unspeakable Love
LGBT Science Fiction/Fantasy/Horror	Neal Drinnan, Izzy and Eve	Elizabeth Bear, Carnival; Douglas Clegg, Mordred, Bastard Son; R. W. Day, A Strong and Sudden Thaw; Chris Moriarty, Spin Control
LGBT Studies	Horace L. Griffin, Their Own Receive Them Not	Carellin Brooks, Every Inch A Man: Phallic Possession, etc.; David Eisenbach, Gay Power: An American Revolution; Robert McRuer, Crip Theory; Kathryn Stockton, Beautiful Bottom, Beautiful Shame
Spirituality	Michael McColly, The After-Death Room	Daniel Helminiak, Sex & the Sacred; Lisa L. Moore and G. Winston James, Spirited; Mary Saracino, The Singing of Swans; Giti Thadani, Mobius Trip
Transgender Literature	Susan Stryker and Stephen Whittle, eds., The Transgender Studies Reader	Paisley Currah, Richard M. Juang and Shannon Price Minter, Transgender Rights; Leslie Feinberg, Drag King Dreams; Alicia E. Goranson, Supervillainz; Max Wolf Valerio, The Testosterone Files
