= Tim Beck =

Tim Beck may refer to:

- Tim Beck (American football, born 1964), American football coach for the Vanderbilt Commodores
- Tim Beck (American football, born 1966), American football coach for the South Florida Bulls

== See also ==
- Timothy Beck (born 1977), Dutch sprinter
- Timothy James Beck, American pseudonymous novelist
- Tim Beckham (born 1990), American baseball player
- Tim Beckman (born 1965), American football head coach
