= Jeremy Caniglia =

American painter

- Born: July 13, 1970 (age 56); Omaha, Nebraska, U.S.
- Other name: Caniglia
- Education: Iowa State University, Maryland Institute College of Art
- Known for: Painting, drawing, photography
- Movement: Abstract expressionism, Post-Modernism

Jeremy Caniglia (born July 13, 1970) is an American figurative painter and illustrator, primarily in fantasy and horror genres. He has done book and magazine illustration, conceptual artwork, book and album covers, and comic books, and his work is in several important public collections including the Joslyn Art Museum and Iowa State University. His art has also been shown at the Society of Illustrators' Museum of Illustration.

== Early life and education ==
Jeremy Caniglia was born July 13, 1970, in Omaha, Nebraska. He went to Creighton Preparatory School, where he was first introduced to art.

He studied traditional classical painting at Iowa State University (ISU), receiving a B.F.A. in Drawing, Painting and Printmaking in 1993. After graduation he studied at the Maryland Institute College of Art (MICA) in Baltimore, Maryland under well-known abstract expressionist painter, Grace Hartigan. He received his M.F.A. from MICA in 1995. In 2012, Caniglia began working at Creighton Preparatory Schools as a full-time teaching staff and served as an adjunct professor for Creighton University.

In 2017, Caniglia apprenticed and studied with the figurative artist Odd Nerdrum.

== Work ==
Caniglia's "Birth of Sunrise"

In addition to Hartigan, whom he cites as "bringing new insight to his work," Caniglia was also influenced by the Old Masters including Leonardo da Vinci and Caravaggio.

Caniglia's art has been featured in the Washington Post and on CNN. He has created book covers for well-known mainstream authors (Stephen King, Ray Bradbury, Peter Straub, Douglas Clegg, F. Paul Wilson) and he has done cover art and illustrations for a number of noted horror and fantasy writers including Ed Lee and Charlee Jacob. His work has also appeared in Entertainment and horror magazines such as Rue Morgue magazine, Variety, Fangoria magazine, Flesh and Blood, and Cemetery Dance.

Caniglia has also created artwork for public institutions and churches. In 2009 he created a religious icon of Saint Lucy for St. Francis Cabrini Church located in Little Italy (Omaha), in Nebraska.

In 2013 Lonely Road Books published a special limited edition of The Exorcist: The 40th Anniversary Revised Edition by William Peter Blatty. The new, updated edition featured new and revised material that Blatty had left out of the original book. Lonely Road Books and William Peter Blatty brought in Caniglia to create all new cover and interior artwork for this special edition. Caniglia worked with Warner Home Video creating artwork for the film documentary on William Peter Blatty and the creation of The Exorcist directed by Laurent Bouzereau.

In 2013 Cemetery Dance published a new limited Edition of World War Z: An Oral History of the Zombie War by Max Brooks. Caniglia created all new artwork cover for this special release to coincide with the film release of World War Z. In the fall of 2013 he completed Easton Press' 170th anniversary edition of Charles Dickens' A Christmas Carol. In the fall of 2016 he completed the Easton Press' limited artist edition of O.Henry' short stories.

In 2017, Caniglia left Omaha to apprentice with the Norwegian figurative painter Odd Nerdrum. His print "Dreaming of Rembrandt" won an award in the Salmagundi Club's SCNY Monotype Exhibition in 2018. In 2020, David Weiss directed a documentary short film about Caniglia's life and work. This documentary was selected for Nebraska short films encore screening at the 2020 Omaha Film Festival.

== Awards ==
Caniglia was nominated first in 2003 for the International Horror Guild Award for best artist in dark fantasy and horror and then again in 2004, this time winning the prestigious award. In 2005 he was nominated for a World Fantasy Award for Best Artist in Fantasy. In 2015 Caniglia received the prestigious Design Achievement Award from the College of Design at Iowa State University.

== Bibliography ==
This is a list of published illustration work.

=== Art books ===
- Caniglia (2004). As Dead as Leaves: The Art of Caniglia. Shocklines Press. ISBN 0974908703.
- Spectrum issues 6, 10, 11, 12, and 13
- Flemming, Robyn (2007). Metamorphosis: 50 Contemporary Surreal, Fantastic and Visionary Artists. BeinART Publishing. ISBN 978-0980323108.
- Gothic Art Now: The Very Best In Contemporary Gothic Art, ILEX Publishing, 2008
- Awaken: A New Spirit In Figurative Painting-Caniglia, Unimpressed Press Art books, 2009
- I Before E Except after Death, Unimpressed Press Art books, 2011
- Infected by Art: Volume Two, Hermes Press, 2014
- Infected by Art: Volume Three, Hermes Press, 2015

=== Book, comic and album covers ===
- 2002
  - Breeder by Douglas Clegg
  - Darkoffspring edited by Brian Knight
  - Irish Witchcraft & Demonology by St. John d. Seymour
  - The Wicked by Douglas Clegg
  - This Cape is Red Because I Have Been Bleeding by Tom Piccirilli
- 2003
  - Makak by Edward Lee
  - Necromancer by Douglas Clegg
  - Rocksbreak/Scissors Cut by David J. Schow
  - Choir of Ill Children by Tom Piccirilli
  - Ever Nat by Edward Lee
  - F’in Lie Down Already' by Tom Piccirilli
  - Hexes by Tom Piccirilli
  - Neverland by Douglas Clegg
  - Rage by Steve Gerlach
  - The Baby by Edward Lee
- 2004
  - Boneland by Jeffrey Thomas
  - Darklings by Ray Garton
  - Dead Man’s Hand by Tim Lebbon
  - The Machinery of Night by Douglas Clegg
  - The New Neighbor by Ray Garton
  - The Turtle Boy by Kealan Patrick Burke
  - Waiting My Turn Under the Knife by Tom Piccirilli
- 2005
  - Broken Angel by Brian Knight
  - Like Death by Tim Waggoner
  - London Revenant by Conrad Williams
  - The Abandonedby Douglas Clegg
  - Berserk by Tim Lebbon
  - In the Midnight Museum by Gary A. Braunbeck
  - Pieces of Hate by Tim Lebbon
  - Thrust by Tom Piccirilli
  - Wormwood Nights by Charlee Jacob
  - Zero by Michael McBride
  - Masters of Horror Soundtrack, Immortal Records
- 2006
  - She Loves Monsters by Simon Clark
  - Take the Long Way Home by Brian Keene
  - The Halloween Man by Douglas Clegg
  - The Rutting Season by Brian Keene
  - Wild Things-Four Tales by Douglas Clegg
  - Masters of Horror issues 1 and 2, IDW Publishing
- 2007
  - Red Spikes by Margo Lanagan
  - The Everlasting by Tim Lebbon
  - The Peabody-Ozymandias Traveling Circus & Oddity Emporium by F. Paul Wilson
- 2008
  - A Whisper of Southern Lights by Tim Lebbon
- 2009
  - The Locust by Douglas Clegg
  - Tender Morsels by Margo Lanagan
- 2011
  - Gutshot by Conrad Williams
- 2013
  - The Exorcist by William Peter Blatty
  - World War Z: An Oral History of the Zombie War by Max Brooks
  - A Christmas Carol by Charles Dickens
  - Dinner with the Cannibal Sisters by Douglas Clegg
- 2014
  - Submerged by Thomas F. Monteleone
- 2015
  - Bad Dog by Tom Piccirilli
  - Backshot by Tom Piccirilli
  - Backshot by Ed Gorman
- 2017
  - Small World by Tabitha King
- 2018
  - Interview With The Vampire by Anne Rice
  - Caretakers by Tabitha King

=== Book illustrations ===
- 2003
  - White and Other Tales of Ruin by Tim Lebbon
- 2004
  - The Devil’s Wine by Stephen King, Peter Straub, Ray Bradbury
  - The Priest of Blood by Douglas Clegg
  - The Crown Rose by Fiona Avery
  - Great Ghost Stories edited by Stephen Jones
- 2005
  - The Healer by Michael Blumlein, M.D.
- Various years
  - The Adversary Cycle by F. Paul Wilson

=== Magazines ===
- Covers
  - Cemetery Dance issue 70 (2013)
  - Nocturne issue 1 (2005)
  - Cemetery Dance issues 37, 38 (2002)
  - The Horror Express issue 2 (2004)
- Interior art
  - Variety Magazine (July 2005)
  - Rue-Morgue Issues 47, 52
  - Medium Magazine (June 2003)
  - Flesh and Blood issue 13 (August 2003)
  - Churn an Art Magazine issue 6 (2002)
  - Cemetery Dance issue 39 (2002)
  - Cthulhu Sex Magazine Issue 18 (2004)
  - Redsine issue 9 (2003)
  - Dark’s Art Parlour Issue #3 (1996)

=== Movies, DVDs, and TV (as conceptual artist) ===
- Masters of Horror Season 1 (Showtime) 2005 - 2006
- Masters of Horror Japanese DVD release (Kadokawa Pictures, US) 2006
- Black Luck artist and actor in this action movie (2016)
