= Outfest =

American non-profit organization

- Location: Los Angeles, United States
- Founded: 1982
- Founded by: John Ramirez; Stuart Timmons
- Language: English
- Website: outfest.org

Outfest is an LGBTQ-oriented nonprofit that produces two film festivals, operates a movie streaming platform, and runs educational services for filmmakers in Los Angeles. Outfest is one of the key partners, alongside the Frameline Film Festival, the New York Lesbian, Gay, Bisexual, & Transgender Film Festival, and the Inside Out Film and Video Festival, in launching the North American Queer Festival Alliance, an initiative to further publicize and promote LGBT film.

== History ==
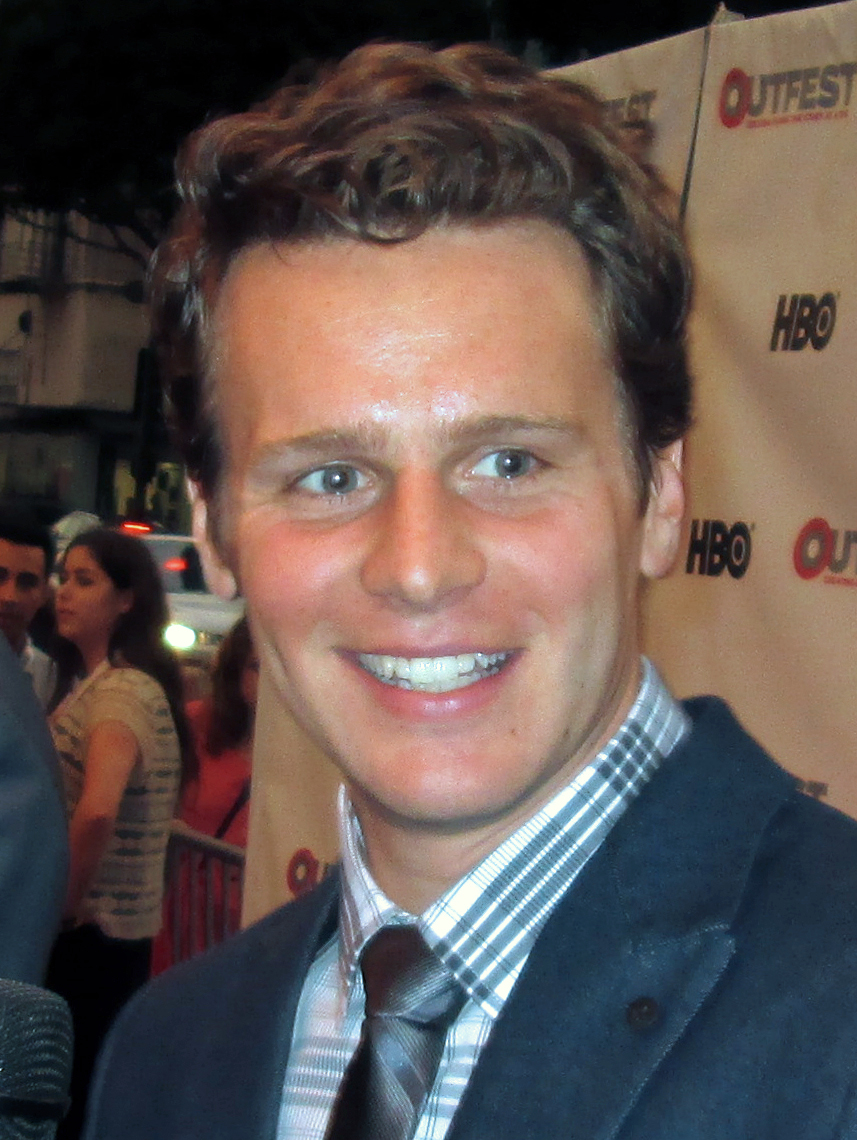
Actor Jonathan Groff, who portrayed Patrick Murray, at the red carpet opening of the Outfest on 11 July 2013 in Los Angeles, where he also spoke about the new series Looking

In 1979, John Ramirez and Stuart Timmons, two students at the University of California, Los Angeles (UCLA), founded a gay film festival on campus. By 1982, it had become known as the "Gay and Lesbian Media Festival and Conference." The name was changed to Outfest in 1994.

In 1996 Outfest began a relationship with Sundance, another film festival.

2004 Was the first year the idea of a queer film festival curating around people of color came about. Outfests then executive Stephen Gutwilig and Kirsten Schaffer are the name behind the idea.

In 2005 UCLA Film & Television Archive and Outfest teamed up to save movies and videos made by LGBTQ people. They called this project the Outfest UCLA Legacy Project. Since, Outfest and UCLA have continued to grow their collection making it possibly one of the biggest attainable resources for moving images.

In September 2016, Outfest held its first traveling film festival in Northampton, Massachusetts, at the Academy of Music Theatre.

The 2018 Outfest film festival was held at the Directors Guild of America in Los Angeles, California. In 2019 the executives of the Outfest film festival decided it was time for a change in location once the Directors Guild of America began renovating. The TCL Chinese Theater also in LA, then became the new home for Outfest film festival.

In June 2020, Outfest partnered with Film Independent to launch the United in Pride digital film festival. Outfest was also one of the key partners, alongside the Frameline Film Festival, the New York Lesbian, Gay, Bisexual, & Transgender Film Festival and the Inside Out Film and Video Festival, in launching the North American Queer Festival Alliance, an initiative to further publicize and promote LGBT film.

In January 2022, Outfest celebrated its 26th queer brunch at Sundance.

== Programs ==
- Outfest Los Angeles LGBTQ Film Festival – Eleven days of world-class films, discussions and parties. Founded in 1982.
- Outfest Fusion QTBIPOC Film Festival – A multi-week celebration of feature and short films, workshops and panels, and parties which center the spectrum of QTBIPOC stories and experiences. Founded in 2003.
- Outfest UCLA Legacy Project – The only program in the world dedicated to protecting LGBTQ+ films for future generations.
- Outfest Forward – Developing the next generation of artists and filmmakers through education and mentoring
- The Outfest Legacy Awards -- Awards ceremony that highlights and congratulates LGBTQIA+ achievers in the industry

== Initiatives ==
Youth

Outfest supports youth through education, mentoring and access to meaningful LGBTQ stories. It also includes:

- Free memberships to youth age 21 years and younger
- OutSet: The Young Filmmakers Project a Collaboration between Outfest and Los Angeles LGBT center. Lasting half a year filmmakers create their own short films.
- Emerging Leaders Council

Alumni

Outfest promotes works by its alumni and encourages them to help educate new and upcoming filmmakers.

== Awards ==
Outfest Los Angeles gives annual awards in 16 categories. Awards are given by Grand Juries, festival audiences and the Programming Committees. Jury awards are given for:

- US Narrative Feature
- International Feature
- Screenwriting
- Performance in a Feature Film
- Documentary Feature

Audience Awards are given for:

- First Narrative Feature
- Narrative Feature
- Documentary Feature
- Narrative Short Film
- Documentary Short Film

Programming awards are given for:

- Freedom Award
- Outstanding Emerging Talent
- Outstanding Artistic Achievement

Outfest also presents the Outfest Legacy Awards every fall.

== See also ==
- List of LGBT film festivals
