= Bad Karma (2001 film) =

- Official DVD cover
- Directed by: John Hough
- Written by: Douglas Clegg (novel); Randall Frakes
- Produced by: Brian R. Etting
- Starring: Patsy Kensit; Patrick Muldoon; Damian Chapa; Amy Locane
- Cinematography: Jacques Haitkin
- Music by: Harry Manfredini
- Distributed by: Artisan Entertainment
- Release date: March 26, 2001; (Finland)
- Running time: 92 minutes
- Country: United States
- Language: English

Bad Karma is a 2001 film directed by John Hough. Patsy Kensit stars as a mental patient who believes she is the reincarnated lover of Jack the Ripper, and that her psychiatrist (Patrick Muldoon) is the reincarnated mass murderer. Damian Chapa and Amy Locane are also in the film, which is adapted by Randall Frakes from the 1997 Douglas Clegg novel of the same name.

== Plot ==
A female mental patient (Patsy Kensit) believing she is the reincarnated soul mate of Jack the Ripper, terrorizes her psychiatrist (Patrick Muldoon), whom she believes is her reincarnated lover. Determined to find her man, and willing to use her sensuality to get to him, she breaks out of the mental institution and is determined to, at any cost, free him of his wife (Amy Locane) and young daughter to restart their previous work as mass murderers, and lovers.

== Cast ==
- Patsy Kensit as Maureen Hatcher / Agnes Thatcher
- Patrick Muldoon as Dr. Trey Campbell
- Damian Chapa as Mr. Miller
- Amy Locane as Carly Campbell
- Amy Huberman as Jenny Pantelli
- Patrick Joseph Byrnes as Detective Arboles
- Aimee O'Sullivan as Teresa Campbell
- Vinnie McCabe as Arthur
- Rachel O'Riordan as Denise
- Sean Power as Richard
- Merina Millsapp as Edie
- Nick Hardin as Dad

== Production ==
=== Filming ===
The film was released as Hell's Gate in the United States and was filmed on location in Galway, Ireland. The nude scenes of Amy Huberman's character were actually performed by Zoe Paul.

== Release ==
=== Home media ===
The film was released on DVD on July 23, 2002, on Region 1 in English.
