= Bram & Alice =

- Genre: Sitcom
- Created by: Joe Keenan; Christopher Lloyd
- Starring: Alfred Molina; Traylor Howard; Roger Bart; Katie Finneran; Michael Rispoli
- Composer: Bruce Miller
- Country of origin: United States
- Original language: English
- No. of seasons: 1
- No. of episodes: 9 (5 unaired)

Production
- Executive producers: Christopher Lloyd; Joe Keenan
- Production locations: Los Angeles, California, United States
- Running time: 30 minutes
- Production companies: Picador Productions; Knotty Entertainment; Paramount Network Television

Original release
- Network: CBS
- Release: October 6 – October 27, 2002

Bram & Alice is an American sitcom that aired on CBS from October 6 to October 27, 2002. The series only aired four episodes, although an additional five unaired episodes were also produced.

== Plot ==
The series centered on Bram Shepard, who won a Pulitzer Prize twenty years earlier for writing the best-selling novel Matthew Kent, and Alice O'Connor, who came to his door one day and informed him that she was his daughter, the result of a one-night stand he had when he was a guest lecturer at Vassar College.

== Cast ==
- Alfred Molina as Bram Shepard
- Traylor Howard as Alice O'Connor
- Roger Bart as Paul Newman
- Katie Finneran as Katie
- Michael Rispoli as Michael

== Episodes ==
| No. | Title | Directed by | Written by | Original release date | U.S. viewers (millions) |
|---|---|---|---|---|---|
| 1 | "Pilot" | James Burrows | Joe Keenan & Christopher Lloyd | October 6, 2002 | 10.91 |
| 2 | "Cat Burglar" | Jerry Zaks | Joe Keenan & Christopher Lloyd | October 13, 2002 | 9.96 |
| 3 | "Paul-Pot" | Jerry Zaks | Michael Davidoff | October 20, 2002 | 8.27 |
| 4 | "Goody Two Shoes" | Jerry Zaks | Jennifer Crittenden | October 27, 2002 | 7.31 |
| 5 | "Required Reading" | Jerry Zaks | Paul Corrigan & Brad Walsh | Unaired | TBD |
| 6 | "Getting to Know You" | Jerry Zaks | Adam Braff | Unaired | TBD |
| 7 | "Book of the Dead" | Jerry Zaks | Paul Corrigan & Brad Walsh | Unaired | TBD |
| 8 | "Scribbling Rivalry" | Will Mackenzie | Jennifer Crittenden | Unaired | TBD |
| 9 | "Alice Doesn't Live Here Anymore" | Will Mackenzie | Ken Levine & David Isaacs | Unaired | TBD |

== Broadcast and release ==
Universal HD aired all nine episodes of the series during the spring of 2010. The series has not been released on DVD.
