= Lisa L. Moore =

Canadian-American academic and poet

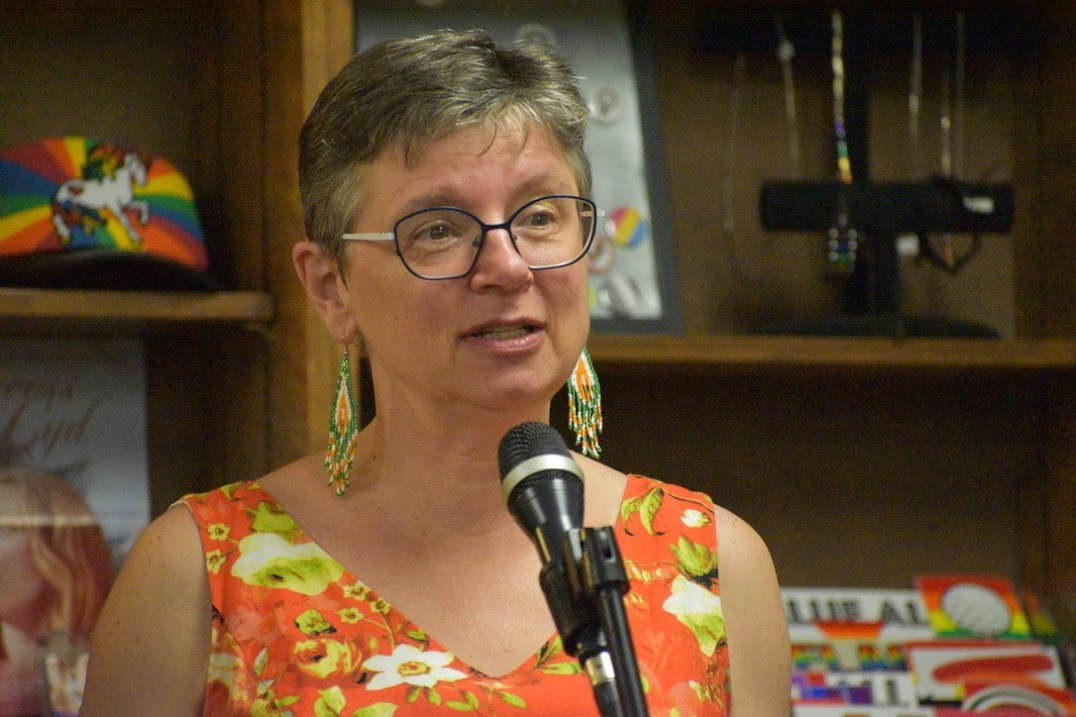
Lisa L. Moore

Lisa L. Moore is a Canadian–American academic and poet. She earned a B.A. in English with honors at Queen's University in 1986, and then completed her doctorate at Cornell University in 1991. Principal themes in Moore’s work include the centrality of love between women to literary genres such as the novel, the landscape arts, and the sonnet; the transatlantic and multi-racial history of feminist art and thinking; and the importance of poetry to second-wave feminist, womanist, and lesbian cultures and politics.

Moore has published two single-authored books: Sister Arts: The Erotics of Lesbian Landscapes (Minnesota, 2011), which was awarded Lambda Literary Award in LGBT Studies in 2011 and named a finalist for the Publishing Triangle Judy Grahn Award; and Dangerous Intimacies: Toward a Sapphic History of the British Novel (Duke, 1997). In 2015, Moore published a scholarly edition of The Collected Poems of Anna Seward (Routledge). She has also co-edited two books: Transatlantic Feminisms in the Age of Revolutions (Oxford, 2011) (with Joanna Brooks and Caroline Wigginton), which won the Choice Outstanding Academic Book Award for 2012; and Experiments in a Jazz Aesthetic: Art, Activism, Academia and the Austin Project (2010) (with Omi Osun Joni L. Jones, and Sharon Bridgforth), an anthology of creative writing and theory by women of color and allies. She has published articles in Critical Inquiry, GLQ, Eighteenth-Century Studies, Feminist Studies, and other journals.

Moore's poetry chapbook, 24 Hours of Men, was published by Dancing Girl Press in 2018. Her poems have also appeared in Texas Borderlands Poetry Review, Tinderbox Poetry Journal, Nimrod International Journal, and other venues. Her public scholarship includes essays for the Los Angeles Review of Books, The Women's Review of Books, and Diversity and Democracy. She contributes to the op-ed pages of The Dallas Morning News, the San Antonio Express-News, the Houston Chronicle, and other periodicals on topics including gun violence, LGBTQ issues, and feminism.

Moore was a founder of the Pride and Equity Faculty-Staff Association at UT-Austin and was active in the fight for equitable compensation for employees with same-sex partners. She also helped start Gun-Free UT, a community of activists protesting campus carry and permitless carry laws at The University of Texas. With Dr. Mia Carter and Dr. Jennifer Glass, Lisa Moore brought suit against the Governor of Texas, the Chancellor of the University of Texas Board of Regents, and the President of the University of Texas, arguing that allowing concealed, loaded weapons in college classrooms is creates a chilling effect on free speech (Glass v. Paxton). In 2015, she was named "One of Ten Americans Who Changed the Gun Debate This Year" in The Trace.

Moore joined the faculty at the University of Texas at Austin in 1991, where she is Archibald A. Hill Professor of English and Professor of Women's and Gender Studies. She was the Director of the LGBTQ Studies Program at The University of Texas at Austin from 2019–2023, and has been the Chair of the Department of Women's, Gender, and Sexuality Studies at the University of Texas at Austin since 2023.

== Major works ==
- Moore, Lisa L. (2011). Sister Arts: The Erotics of Lesbian Landscapes. University of Minnesota Press. ISBN 978-0-8166-7013-0.
- Moore, Lisa L. (1997). Dangerous Intimacies: Toward a Sapphic History of the British Novel. Duke University Press. ISBN 978-0-8223-9654-3.
- Lisa L. Moore, ed. (2016). The Collected Poems of Anna Seward. Routledge. doi:10.4324/9781315642475. ISBN 9781315642475.
- Moore, Lisa L.; Brooks, Joanna; Wigginton, Caroline (2011). Transatlantic Feminisms in the Age of Revolutions. Oxford University Press. ISBN 9780199743490.
- Omi Osun Joni L. Jones; Lisa L. Moore; Sharon Bridgforth, eds. (2010). Experiments in a Jazz Aesthetic: Art, Activism, Academia and the Austin Project. University of Texas Press. ISBN 978-0-292-72287-3.
- Moore, Lisa L. (2018). 24 Hours of Men. Poetry chapbook. Dancing Girl Press & Studio.

== Selected articles and book chapters ==
- "The Sonnet is Not a Luxury." Hopkins Review 14:2 (Spring 2021), pp.248–255
- “A Lesbian History of the Sonnet.” Critical Inquiry 43: 4 (Summer 2017), pp. 813–838.
- “The Future of Lesbian Genders.” Genders 1:1 (Spring 2016).
- "Safe Space, Storage Sheds, and Outdoor Plumbing: Lesbian Garden History.” Queering the Interior. Ed. Matt Cook and Andrew Gorman-Murray. London: Bloomsbury Books, 2016.
- “Women’s Land as Garden History: Art, Activism, and Lesbian Spaces.” Disciples of Flora: Gardens in History and Culture. Eds. Victoria Pagan, Judith Wallack Page, and Brigitte Weltman-Aron. Cambridge: Cambridge Scholars Press, 2015, pp 20–31.
- "Virtual Delville as Archival Research: Rendering Women’s Garden History Visible." Visualizing the Archive. Spec. issue of Poetess Archive Journal 2.1 (2010)
- “The Swan of Litchfield: Sarah Pierce and the Lesbian Landscape Poem.” Long Before Stonewall: Histories of Same-Sex Sexuality in Early America. Ed. Thomas A. Foster. New York: NYU Press, 2007. 253-276.
- “Queer Gardens: Mary Delany’s Flowers and Friendships.” Eighteenth-Century Studies 39.1 (2005): 49-70.
- “Lesbian Migrations: Mary Renault’s South Africa.” GLQ: A Journal of Lesbian and Gay Studies 10.1 (November 2003): 23-46.
- “Acts of Union: Sexuality and Nationalism, Romance and Realism in the Irish National Tale.” Cultural Critique 44 (Winter 2000): 113-144.
- "Teledildonics: Virtual Lesbians in the Fiction of Jeannette Winterson.” Sexy Bodies: The Strange Carnalities of Feminism. Ed. Elizabeth Grosz and Elspeth Probyn. London: Routledge, 1995. 104-127.
- “'Something More Tender Still Than Friendship': Romantic Friendship in Early Nineteenth Century England.” Feminist Studies 18.3 (Fall 1992): 499-520. Rpt. in Lesbian Subjects: A Feminist Studies Reader. Ed. Martha Vicinus. Bloomington: Indiana University Press, 1996.
- “'She was too fond of her mistaken bargain': The Scandalous Relations of Gender and Sexuality in Feminist Theory.” Diacritics 21/22 (Summer-Fall 1991): 89-101.
- “Sexual Agency in Manet's Olympia.” Textual Practice 3.2 (June 1989): 222-233.
