= Putting on the Ritz (novel) =

1991 novel by Joe Keenan

- Author: Joe Keenan
- Language: English
- Genre: Novel
- Publisher: Viking Press
- Publication date: 1991
- Publication place: United States
- Media type: Print
- Pages: 336
- ISBN: 0-670-83877-2 (1st edition)
- Preceded by: Blue Heaven
- Followed by: My Lucky Star

Putting on the Ritz (1991) is the second book by novelist Joe Keenan. It is a gay-themed comedy about three friends who become involved in the New York City magazine publishing industry.

== Characters ==
- Gilbert Selwyn, an over-sexed gay New Yorker and best friend of Philip Cavanaugh. Gilbert is perpetually poor, but constantly scheming to make a quick buck. Gilbert longs to be a writer, but sloth causes him to never put pen to paper.
- Philip Cavanaugh, Gilbert's long-suffering best friend and fellow New Yorker. Once Gilbert's teenage boyfriend (until an unfortunate case of crabs, caught from one of Gilbert's many sugar daddies, broke them up), Philip is a struggling writer with only minimal talent. Reluctant to be part of Gilbert's schemes, he usually gives in because he longs for money, fame and "the good life."
- Claire Simmons, Philip's other (heterosexual) best friend. Claire is a struggling writer with a modicum of talent, a zaftig figure, and a deep loathing for Gilbert Selwyn. Claire is the most level-headed of Philip's friends, and usually gets him out of Gilbert-caused jams. Claire and Philip are constantly collaborating on the Next Big Novel or Play.
- Elsa Champion, the talentless wife of billionaire real estate magnate Peter Champion. She thinks she can sing.
- Peter Champion, a billionaire real estate developer, is the husband of Elsa Champion and one of the most hated men in New York. His business practices are considered dirty, corrupt, graft-ridden, violent and on the whole unethical. But his wealth protects him.
- Boyd Larkin, a billionaire publisher whose pet project is an upscale magazine called "Choice." Larkin is Peter Champion's arch-rival and hated competitor, although he shares Champion's lust for money and dirty dealing.
- Tommy Parker, the editor of Boyd's magazine "Boulevardier" and one of the most dashing, handsome men in New York City.

== Plot summary ==
Philip and Claire's latest efforts at breaking onto Broadway have flopped, but their efforts have not gone unnoticed by Gilbert's employer, Tommy Parker. Tommy is a gofer for billionaire Boyd Larkin, who wants to insert a spy into the household of his arch-rival billionaire, Peter Champion. Peter's wife, Elsa, is seeking to launch a singing career and needs just the right songwriting team. Gilbert, on the other hand, is hoping that helping Parker and Larkin pull off their scheme will advance his own chances at snagging the world's wealthiest sugar daddy.

Philip and Claire are soon hired. Unfortunately, Elsa can't carry a tune and her acting abilities are nonexistent. Nonetheless, they have to make her look good - if they manage to pull it off, they'll be on the fast track to fame.

It's not long before Philip and Gilbert are caught spying, which leads them to become double-agents, double-double agents, and triple-agents. And when the man of their dreams turns out to be a homosexual, suddenly Philip and Gilbert are competing for his financial (and sexual) favors and betraying one another as well.

== Critical reception ==
According to the Los Angeles Times: "All kinds of things make "Putting on the Ritz" better than the average farce: the writing, which is witty and inventive [...]; the plotting, which is carefully worked out and totally implausible in the accepted Wodehouse-Coward-Cole Porter way; the tone, which is unfailingly light, as if the ‘20s were still with us."
