= Mordred, Bastard Son =

2006 book by Douglas Clegg

- First edition cover
- Author: Douglas Clegg
- Language: English
- Genre: Arthurian fantasy
- Publisher: Alyson Books
- Publication date: January 1, 2006
- Publication place: United States
- Media type: Print (Hardcover & paperback)
- Pages: 360
- ISBN: 978-1-555-83899-7

Mordred, Bastard Son is a 2006 Arthurian fantasy novel by Douglas Clegg. It tells the story of a sympathetic Mordred, including a romance with Lancelot. The novel was nominated for a 2007 Lambda Literary Award (category LGBT Science Fiction/Fantasy/Horror).

== Plot ==
The illegitimate son of King Arthur and Morgan le Fay, Mordred has been raised in exile, overshadowed by his mother's desire for vengeance against Arthur. He is soon distracted from his studies under Merlin by his attraction to the fallen knight Lancelot.

== Reception ==
Publishers Weekly described the story as "revisionist Arthurian fantasy", noting that Clegg goes against convention by portraying Mordred as a sympathetic character, rather than the villain. Publishers Weekly reviewer wrote, "Clegg ... maintains a nice balance between the human and mythic dimensions of his characters, portraying the familiar elements of their story from refreshingly original angles."

In 2007, Mordred, Bastard Son was nominated for a Lambda Literary Award for LGBT Science Fiction/Fantasy/Horror.

== Sequel ==
A sequel, Mordred, Dragon Prince, was originally announced for publication in late 2018, but has since been delayed.
