= Blue Heaven (Keenan novel) =

1988 novel by Joe Keenan

- Author: Joe Keenan
- Language: English
- Publisher: Penguin Books
- Publication date: 1988
- Publication place: United States
- Media type: Print (paperback)
- Pages: 279
- ISBN: 0-14-010764-9
- Followed by: Putting on the Ritz

Blue Heaven (1988) is the first book by novelist Joe Keenan. It is a gay-themed comedy about four friends who get caught up in ill-fated attempt to scam a Mafia family by faking a marriage and absconding with the cash and gifts that the prospective in-laws will shower on the lucky couple.

== Plot summary ==
Gilbert Selwyn and Moira Finch usually can't stand each other. They have only two things in common: an aversion to honest work, and wealthy stepfamilies. But they have a plan: they intend to get married. Gilbert recently went to his "fat cousin Steffy's wedding", where he realized that his normally tight-fisted stepfather's family became overwhelmingly generous for a family wedding; Moira's stepfather, the Duke of Dorsetshire, is likewise poised to shower the couple with cash, checks, and gifts worth tens of thousands of dollars. Gilbert estimates that he and Moira might clear $100,000 each by marrying, living together for a decent interval, and then divorcing.

But to make the plan work, Gilbert has to have a best man and someone who'll swear that his homosexuality was "just a phase." That someone is Philip Cavanaugh, the narrator of the story: Gilbert's best friend, former lover, and an aspiring songwriter. At first Phillip wants no part of the plan—having suffered the disastrous fallout of Gilbert's previous get-rich-quick schemes—but agrees as soon as Gilbert offers him a cut of the take, enough to afford a computer and some decent Scotch.

But there's a snag: Moira's mother, the Duchess, says on the phone that she doesn't have enough ready cash to pay for the wedding, so she asks Moira to pay for it from her trust fund. Only, Moira has already induced her banker, Winslow, to embezzle the funds, and blown her inheritance on several zany investment schemes. She quickly comes up with a new plan: convince Gilbert's stepfather, Tony Cellini, to pay for the wedding, with the "promise" that the Duchess will reimburse Moira for what "she" has spent from her trust fund—in effect, doubling the couple's take from the wedding.

Over lunch with Gilbert's perky but extremely naive mother, Maddie, Phillip becomes nervous at hearing about Tony's mysterious comings-and-goings and the surprisingly high number of "accidental" deaths in his family. Phillip suspects that Gilbert and Moira's future in-laws (and victims) are mafiosi. Both Gilbert and Moira find the notion preposterous, but Phillip cracks and confides all to his songwriting partner, the brainy Claire Simmons.

At the Cellini family's Christmas party, Claire needs only one quick look to confirm that Gilbert's in-laws are mafiosos, the patriarch of the clan being infamous gangster Freddy "the Pooch" Bombelli. She and Phillip pull Gilbert into a bathroom and acquaint him with two hard facts: One, attempting to swindle the Mafia is stupid; and Two, attempting to do so partnered with Moira is suicidal, for she has already ingratiated herself with Gilbert's family far more successfully than he, and would throw him and Phillip to the wolves in a heartbeat if anything went wrong. Watching Moira schmoozing with the clan, it is also horrifyingly obvious that Moira knows full well they are mafiosi, yet intends to swindle them anyway.

Claire reasons that the best way for Phillip and Gilbert to extricate themselves is to tip off the Duchess to Moira's trust fund swindle. Unfortunately, both their anonymous letter and phone call to the Duchess are intercepted by Moira's accomplice, the Duchess's butler, and Moira misidentifies Gilbert's old nemesis, Gunther Von Steigel, and Moira's friend Vulpina, as the blackmailers. Phillip and Gilbert are helpless to stop Moira as she engineers a campaign of terror and revenge against Gunther and Vulpina, which increases Gunther's suspicions of Gilbert and the wedding.

Claire, sensing something wrong, does further research, and gathers Phillip, Gilbert, and Moira together to reveal the truth: the "Duchess" doesn't exist. Moira made up her mother's status years ago, as an amusing lie to tell her friends, which suddenly became necessary to maintain when Gilbert wanted to partner with Moira to bilk his wealthy family (Moira's real mother, Claire gleefully confides, is currently serving a prison term in California, "learning respect for other people's property"). Likewise, Moira has never had a trust fund; that was just a ruse to explain away her mother's inability to pay for the wedding. Winslow is a chemist, rather than a banker, who impersonated the Duchess on the telephone for Phillip and Gilbert's benefit.

Moira admits the truth, but refuses to abandon the wedding. Claire concedes that she can't expose Moira without exposing Phillip and Gilbert, so she can only offer her reluctant assistance in pulling off the swindle—something that she now believes is possible, as long as they can convincingly stage the Duchess' "tragic" death before the wedding.

Everything seems to be going smoothly, until Freddy Bombelli tells Moira that he plans to visit her mother in England while he is there for a business trip. Moira panics and says he can't, because her mother will be in New York in a week. They now have to convince the extremely anxious Winslow to pose as a woman, since his extremely distinctive vocal impression of the Duchess cannot be imitated. To their surprise, Winslow turns out to be an entirely convincing Duchess, and Freddy is captivated.

== Characters ==
- Gilbert Selwyn, an over-sexed gay New Yorker and best friend of Philip Cavanaugh. Gilbert is perpetually poor, but constantly scheming to make a quick buck. Gilbert longs to be a writer, but sloth causes him to never put pen to paper.
- Philip Cavanaugh, the narrator of the story, is Gilbert's long-suffering best friend and fellow New Yorker. Once Gilbert's teenage boyfriend (until an unfortunate case of crabs, caught from one of Gilbert's many sugar daddies, broke them up), Philip is a struggling writer with only minimal talent. Reluctant to be part of Gilbert's schemes, he usually gives in because he longs for money, fame and "the good life."
- Claire Simmons, Philip's other (heterosexual) best friend. Claire is a struggling writer with a modicum of talent, a zaftig figure, and a deep loathing for Gilbert Selwyn. Claire is the most level-headed of Philip's friends, and usually gets him out of Gilbert-caused jams. Claire and Philip are constantly collaborating on the Next Big Novel or Play.
- Moira Finch, a fellow New Yorker and mooch. Moira has dreams of glory but no class (she once invested her entire trust fund in designer pasta). Although Gilbert, Philip, and Claire hate Moira, they never quite seem able to avoid running into her and getting blackmailed into participating in her (often illegal) schemes.
- Vulpina, Moira's morose, painfully thin, Goth best friend and clothing designer.
- Gunther Von Steigle, an actor and Boris Karloff-lookalike with terrible acne. He is Gilbert's sworn enemy, after Gilbert slept with (and then kicked out) Gunther's one true love.
- Madeleine Cellini, Gilbert's oft-widowed mother and newly married to New York City mafioso Tony Cellini. Maddie (as everyone calls her) is a little batty, and doesn't quite realize what her new husband does or where his money comes from.
- Tony Cellini, Gilbert's new stepfather. He's suspicious of Gilbert's oddly all-male bachelor lifestyle, and devoted to Maddie.
- Freddy Bombelli, the seemingly ancient head of Tony Cellini's Mafia family who has an eye for Moira...
- The Duchess of Dorsetshire, Moira Finch's mother. Raised in Pittsburgh, she married a British duke and moved to England. She sounds amazingly like Hermione Gingold. But she might not be who she says she is.
- Winslow Potts, the transvestite, drug-addicted, alcoholic banker who handles Moira Finch's trust fund. In fact, he "handled" it right over to her for all sorts of crazy schemes, and now oversees a bankrupt trust.

== Reception ==
Jonathan Kirsch, writing in The Los Angeles Times, completed the book on its "gratuitously exotic and thoroughly gay" setting, as well as Keenan's "fast-lane patter". The humor of the work was praised by John Michael Sophos, of the Seattle Gay News, who recommend as "a perfect travel companion", and compared it favorably to the works of Coward and Wodehouse.

After David Lloyd, then a writer of Cheers, read the book, he—along with series creators Glen and Les Charles—liked it so much that they offered Keenan the chance to develop a new show for television. This partnership would lead to Gloria Vane, a show that was not picked up, and eventually with Keenan writing for Frasier.
