= Bang (Desperate Housewives) =

- Desperate Housewives episode
- Episode no.: Season 3 Episode 7
- Directed by: Larry Shaw
- Written by: Joe Keenan
- Production code: 307
- Original air date: November 5, 2006
- Running time: 45 minutes

Guest appearances
- Dougray Scott as Ian Hainsworth; Kathryn Joosten as Karen McCluskey; Laurie Metcalf as Carolyn Bigsby; Kiersten Warren as Nora Huntington; Brian Kerwin as Harvey Bigsby; Matt Roth as Art Shepherd; Rachel Fox as Kayla Huntington Scavo; Michael Bofshever as Kenny Stevens; Michael Durrell as Myron Katzburg; Pat Crawford Brown as Ida Greenberg; Kathleen Gati as Maya; Matt Casper as Stockboy; Christine Clayburg as Reporter; Maile Flanagan as Cashier; John C. Moskoff as Judge; Joe Sabatino as Police Captain; Anne Bellamy as Female Hostage

Episode chronology
← Previous "Sweetheart, I Have to Confess"	Next → "Children and Art"
- Desperate Housewives season 3

"Bang" is the seventh episode of the third season of the ABC television series Desperate Housewives, and the 54th overall episode of the series. The episode was written by Joe Keenan and directed by Larry Shaw, and was first broadcast on November 5, 2006.

The episode received critical acclaim, and is widely considered to be one of the series' best episodes. "Bang" garnered 22.65 million viewers upon its initial broadcast, 6.6% more viewers than the previous episode, which garnered 21.24 million viewers. Felicity Huffman submitted this episode for consideration on her behalf in the category of “Outstanding Lead Actress in a Comedy Series” at the 2007 Emmy Awards, and was later nominated.

== Plot ==
=== Background ===
Desperate Housewives focuses on the lives of several residents in the suburban neighborhood of Wisteria Lane. In previous episodes, Nora Huntington (Kiersten Warren) kisses married man Tom Scavo (Doug Savant) before being threatened by his wife Lynette (Felicity Huffman). Julie Mayer (Andrea Bowen) meets Edie Britt's (Nicollette Sheridan) nephew Austin McCann (Josh Henderson). Susan Mayer (Teri Hatcher) makes plans to go to France with Ian Hainsworth (Dougray Scott). Carlos Solis (Ricardo Antonio Chavira) and Gabrielle "Gaby" Solis (Eva Longoria) reunite. Bree Van de Kamp (Marcia Cross) finds out that her husband, Orson Hodge (Kyle MacLachlan) hit his ex-wife Alma (Valerie Mahaffey) and Harvey Bigsby (Brian Kerwin) admits to Orson that he cheated on his wife Carolyn (Laurie Metcalf).

=== Episode ===
The episode begins with Carolyn Bigsby shooting at her husband Harvey in the grocery store he owns because he has been having an affair. He locks himself in his office, and she holds the supermarket shoppers at gunpoint.

Earlier that morning, Bree Van de Kamp confronts her husband Orson Hodge about the police report from the night he supposedly beat his first wife Alma. He convinces her that she suffered her injuries due to a fall after attacking him. Bree reveals that Carolyn gave her the report, and Orson mentions that Carolyn's husband is cheating on her. Bree tells Carolyn that Harvey has been cheating on her. Carolyn rings Harvey at the supermarket, and tells him she knows about the affair. He tries to tell her that Monique is dead. Carolyn then goes to a drawer and takes out a gun.

Nora Huntington tells Lynette and her husband Tom that she is moving to Mexico with Kayla, her daughter with Tom, despite their opposition. In the supermarket, Nora begins threatening Lynette to not apply for custody of Kayla, and the two begin to fight when a gunshot is heard.

Gabrielle and her husband Carlos are settling the final terms of their separation. Carlos reveals that Gabrielle seduced him in order to stall the divorce as she believed he was coming into some money. The judge decides Carlos gets everything in the house and Gabrielle only gets the house. When they arrive home, each tries to destroy the property left to the other in the settlement. Later, Gabrielle tells Carlos she hates the people they've become and that she could easily be in Carolyn's place at the supermarket.

Carolyn holds the shoppers hostage, including Lynette, Nora, Julie Mayer, Edie Britt's nephew Austin McCann and new resident Art Shepard (Matt Roth) after she cannot enter Harvey's office, in which Edie has also taken refuge. Nora tells Carolyn that Lynette is trying to steal her child and Lynette argues that Nora tried to seduce her husband. Carolyn immediately shoots Nora in the chest. As Nora dies, she asks Lynette to take care of Kayla for her, and Lynette promises to do so. Carolyn quarrels with Lynette about Nora and Harvey, and eventually tries to shoot Lynette, but she is knocked off balance, only shooting Lynette in her left arm and dropping the gun. Carolyn and Austin struggle for it until one of the hostages picks it up and shoots Carolyn in the head. The hostages are released, and reunited with their loved ones waiting outside.

== Production ==
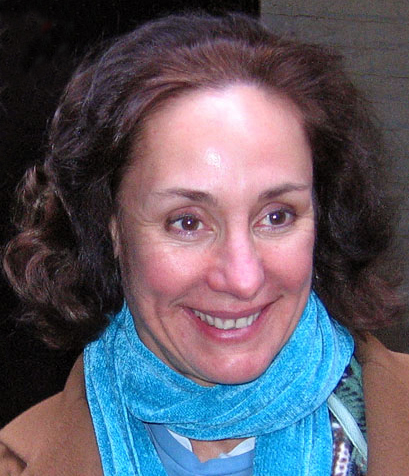
The episode featured Laurie Metcalf's (pictured) fourth and final appearance in Desperate Housewives following her character's death.

"Bang" was written by Joe Keenan and directed by Larry Shaw. Due to time constraints, the opening credits were completely cut from the episode. Although credited, James Denton who portrays Mike Delfino, does not appear in the episode due to his character being hospitalized following a hit-and-run. Brenda Strong makes a physical appearance as Mary Alice Young, appearing in Lynette's dream at the beginning and end of the episode, marking her only physical appearance in the season.

The episode marked the first in a string of four guest appearances by actor Matt Roth in the role of Art Shepard, a new resident of Wisteria Lane. Roth is best known for his role on the ABC series Roseanne as Fisher, the abusive boyfriend of Jackie Harris, who is portrayed by Laurie Metcalf, actress of Carolyn Bigsby and Roth's wife at the time. Incidentally, this episode marks the final appearance of Metcalf in the series, as her character is killed off in the episode.

Kiersten Warren, who portrays Nora Huntington, also made her final appearance until her brief cameo in the series finale.

== Accolades ==
"Bang" warranted Felicity Huffman a nomination in the 59th Primetime Emmy Awards for her portrayal of Lynette Scavo. Matt Roth chose this episode for consideration in the category of “Outstanding Guest Actor in a Comedy Series”, as did Brenda Strong, who instead submitted this episode in the category of “Outstanding Voice-Over Performance”.

== Reception ==
=== Ratings ===
The episode premiered on November 5, 2006, and garnered 22.65 million viewers. According to ABC, "Bang" was the second most watched episode of the series' third season, behind "Listen to the Rain on the Roof", and the most watched episode of its premiere week.

=== Critical reception ===
The highest-rated episode of Desperate Housewives is "Bang," which has a 9.5 rating. It's interesting that this episode is the seventh episode of season 3. It's not a season finale or even the series finale. It makes sense why this episode got such a high rating: it has a compelling storyline that is pretty scary to watch.

— Aya Tsintziras, Screen Rant

"Bang" received critical acclaim. The Futon Critic listed "Bang" as the 40th best television episode of 2006. Entertainment Weekly writer Lindsay Soll praised Metcalf's portrayal of Carolyn Bigsby as "an over-the-edge wife who just found out her seemingly faithful husband cheated", and wrote that it was a "great episode overall". In 2015, Gavin Hetherington of SpoilerTV reviewed the episode as one of the best episodes of the series, as well as the best disaster episode of the show. He also noted that Felicity Huffman deserved an Emmy win for her performances in this episode and "Something's Coming". In 2022, Aya Tsintziras of Screen Rant listed "Bang" as the highest-rated episode of the series, describing the episode's storyline as "compelling".
