= Leslie Larson =

American novelist (born 1956)

Leslie Larson (born 1956) is an American novelist. Originally working in the publishing industry, she began working as a freelancer while writing fiction. She wrote two novels: Slipstream (2006) and Breaking Out of Bedlam (2010). She is a two-time Lambda Literary Award finalist, receiving both nominations for the former novel.

== Biography ==
Larson was born in 1956 in San Diego to a working-class family. She obtained her Bachelor of Arts degree from University of California, San Diego. While working for Marion Boyars Publishers in London, she "did everything: typed, answered phones, read manuscripts, edited books, wrote promotional copy." She left the company because the excessive amount of workload involved distracted from her ability to pursue her writing passions, and then moved to San Francisco. Larson also worked freelance in fields such as advertising and newsletters, while simultaneously writing fiction.

In 2006, Larson released her debut novel Slipstream, taking place at Los Angeles International Airport while exploring the paranoia associated with the aftermath of the September 11 attacks. She had gotten the idea for the book when she spent a few hours at an airport bar after missing a flight. She won a Astraea Lesbian Foundation for Justice award in 2006. At the 19th Lambda Literary Awards in 2007, she was a finalist for the Lambda Literary Award for Lesbian Fiction and Lesbian Debut Fiction for Slipstream.

In 2010, Larson wrote another novel titled Breaking Out of Bedlam, focusing on an elderly assisted living facility resident as well as both her past and the present.

Larson has worked at University of California Press as a senior writer.

Larson is lesbian.

== Bibliography ==
- Slipstream (2006)
- Breaking Out of Bedlam (2010)
