= Ana-Maurine Lara =

Dominican American lesbian poet, novelist and black feminist scholar

Ana-Maurine Lara (born 1975) is a Dominican American lesbian poet, novelist and Black feminist scholar.

Lara is a long-time LGBT human rights activist and supporter, having served on the board of directors for the International Gay and Lesbian Human Rights Commission and the Astraea Lesbian Foundation for Justice.

Her creative work and scholarship focus on questions of Black and Indigenous women's freedom, love and ancestors.

== Education ==
She received a Bachelor of Arts in anthropology from Harvard-Radcliffe University, and a PhD in African American studies and anthropology from Yale University.

Since September 2015, she is an assistant professor at the University of Oregon. She has been a faculty member in the department of Anthropology, and most recently, Women, Gender & Sexuality Studies.

== Personal life ==
Lara was born in the Dominican Republic. Lara is the daughter of Erasmo Lara Peña, who served in the United Nations secretariat for 25 years, and briefly served as the Dominican Ambassador to the United Nations. She is also the daughter of the American poet Elizabeth Lara. Lara has two younger siblings.

Lara graduated from Mount Vernon High School, in Mount Vernon, New York. She received a bachelor's degree in anthropology at Harvard University. She completed a master's degree and a PhD in the joint program in African American Studies and Anthropology at Yale University. While at Yale University, she worked under the guidance of scholar Jafari Sinclaire Allen.

== Selected works ==
- Streetwalking: LGBTQ Lives and Protest in the Dominican Republic. Rutgers University Press, 2021.
- Queer Freedom: Black Sovereignty. SUNY Press, 2020.
- Kohnjehr Woman. RedBone Press, Washington D.C., 2017.
- Sum of Parts. Tanama Press, 2017.
- Cantos. Letterpress book. September, 2015.
- Cuando el sol volvió a cantar al pueblo. KRK Ediciones, Madrid, Spain, November 2011.
- Watermarks & Tree Rings. Tanama Press, 2011.
- Erzulie's Skirt. RedBone Press, Washington DC, 2006.

== Performance art ==
- Landlines. Eugene, OR: August, 2015.
- Written on the Body. Austin, TX: 2007.
- Lara, Ana-Maurine, Wura-Natasha Ogunji, Senalka McDonald & Samiya Bashir. Pënz – It's Pronounced Pants, Austin, TX, 2008.
- Lara, A. & Wura-Natasha Ogunji. Serving Desire. A performance dinner, Center for African & African American Studies, UT Austin, TX: May 2006

== Awards and honors ==
- 2021: Jordan Schnitzer Museum of Art Black Lives Matter grant
- 2020: Ruth Benedict Prize for Outstanding Monograph, Association of Queer Anthropologists
- 2019: Laurell Swails and Donald Monroe Memorial Fellowship, Oregon Literary Arts Foundation
- 2018: Finalist (Lesbian Poetry), Lambda Literary Foundation
- 2015: Lilliam Jewel grant for Performance, MRG Foundation
- 2015: Joan Shipley Award, Oregon Arts Commission
- 2012: Fiction Fellow, Callaloo Writers Workshop, Providence, RI
- 2012, 2008, 2007: Poetry Fellow, Cave Canem Foundation, New York, NY
- 2007: Associate Artist, Atlantic Center for the Arts, New Smyrna Beach, FL
- 2007: PEN/Northwest National Award in Fiction
- 2007: Third Prize, 33rd Annual National Latino/Chicano Writers Award
- 2007: Barbara Deming Award for Women Writers in Poetry
- 2007: Finalist (Debut Lesbian Fiction), Lambda Literary Foundation
- 2006: Ensemble Member, The Austin Project, UT Austin, Austin, TX
- 2005: Recipient, Brooklyn Arts Council Grant
