= Neal Drinnan =

Australian writer

- Born: Neal Macrae Drinnan; 4 September 1964 (age 62); Melbourne, Victoria, Australia
- Occupations: novelist, Owner of Cow Lick Bookshop
- Writing career
- Period: 1980s-present
- Notable works: Glove Puppet, Izzy and Eve, Rare Bird of Truth, The Devil's Grip

Neal Drinnan is an Australian writer. He won the Lambda Literary Award in the Science Fiction, Fantasy or Horror category, and was a nominee in the Gay Fiction category, for his 2006 novel Izzy and Eve at the 19th Lambda Literary Awards.

Originally from Melbourne, Victoria, Drinnan has been primarily based in Sydney and regional Victoria.

He has published six novels and non-fiction travel guides for LGBT tourism in Australia. He was also the editor of Fruit Salad: A Compote of Contemporary Gay & Lesbian Writing, an anthology of Australian LGBT writing published by the Sydney Gay and Lesbian Mardi Gras committee in 1997, and has had several short stories published in anthologies.

== Works ==
=== Fiction ===
- Glove Puppet (1998, ISBN 0140267891)
- Pussy's Bow (1999, ISBN 0140282475)
- Quill (2000, ISBN 0140290990)
- Izzy and Eve (2006, ISBN 1931160465)
- Rare Bird of Truth (2010, ISBN 9780731814572)
- Rural Liberties (2017, ISBN 9789887794806)

=== Non-fiction ===
- Out in Sydney (1998, ISBN 9780646348322)
- The Rough Guide to Gay and Lesbian Australia (2001, ISBN 9781858288321)
- The Devil's Grip (2019, ISBN 9781760851187)
