= Publishing Professional Award =

Literary award for queer publishers

The Lambda Literary Publishing Professional Award, established in 2016, "honors a distinguished individual in the lesbian, gay, bisexual and transgender community whose innovative work in the publishing industry promotes and promulgates LGBTQ literature."

== Recipients ==
| Year | Recipient | Description | Ref. |
|---|---|---|---|
| 2016 | Lisa C. Moore | Founder of and editor for RedBone Press | |
| 2017 | Michele Karlsberg | Publicist and founder and editor of Amethyst Press | |
| 2018 | Bluestockings Bookstore | Feminist Bookstore Collective | |
| 2019 | Barbara Smith | | |
| 2020 | Brian Lam | President of Arsenal Pulp Press | |
| 2023 | Charis Books | | |
