= Thomas Roma =

American photographer (born 1950)

Thomas Roma (formerly Thomas Germano; born 1950) is an American photographer who has worked almost exclusively since 1974 exploring the neighborhoods and institutions of his native Brooklyn, photographing scenes from churches, subways and everyday life. His work, made almost exclusively using a homemade camera, has received widespread acclaim.

Roma's work is in the permanent collections of the Museum of Modern Art, San Francisco Museum of Modern Art, Art Institute of Chicago, and Los Angeles County Museum of Art.

== Life and work ==
Roma was a founder of the Department of Photography at Columbia University's School of the Arts and was head of the Department until his retirement in 2018. Roma has also taught photography at Yale, Fordham, and Cooper Union.

He has been awarded two Guggenheim Fellowships and his work has appeared in one-person exhibitions at the Museum of Modern Art (MOMA) and the International Center of Photography in New York City.

For his collections of black-and-white photographs Come Sunday, exhibited at MOMA in 1996, Roma attended more than 150 religious services at 52 black churches in Brooklyn over a period of three years. Come Sunday is one of Roma's best-known works, along with a collection of photographs at people in the Brooklyn courthouses.

In the Vale of Cashmere (2015) contains landscape and portrait photographs at a gay cruising ground in Brooklyn, New York, made over more than 3 years.

=== Siciliano Camera Works ===
In 1972, inspired by a Voigtländer Bergheil camera used by Brassaï, Roma created a prototype medium format 6 cm × 9 cm (2.4 in × 3.5 in) camera, which he used for most of his career. After pictures taken with it won a 1973 New York State Council for the Arts grant, he began selling his cameras under the name "Siciliano Camera Works". Siciliano also manufactured a 35mm hand-held panoramic camera.

=== Reported allegations of sexual misconduct ===
On January 3, 2018, The New York Times published an article about allegations made by five former students from Columbia University and School of Visual Arts, in which they accused Roma of sexual misconduct.

Through an attorney, Roma issued a statement about the accusations: "The statements they [the five women] are making about his asserted misconduct are replete with inaccuracies and falsehoods. All four [five] have taken isolated, innocent incidents, none of them predatory, and have created fictitious versions of reality that are libelous and in the present political climate designed to damage his career and his personal life. Professor Roma’s sympathies then and now lie with those who have been mistreated in any way and he completely fails to understand why these women have chosen to create these complaints two decades after the alleged facts supposedly occurred."

Roma retired from teaching from Columbia University on January 3, 2018, the day New York Times story broke.

The National Gallery of Art cancelled an exhibition of Roma's work, scheduled to open May 2018, because of the accusations.

== Personal ==
Roma is married to Anna Friedlander, daughter of photographer Lee Friedlander. They have one son, Giancarlo T. Roma.

== Books by Roma ==
- Come Sunday (1996). With an introduction by Henry Louis Gates Jr.
- Found in Brooklyn (1996). With an introduction by Robert Coles
- Sunset Park (1998). With an introduction by Ian Frazier.
- Higher Ground (1999)
- Enduring Justice (2001). With an introduction by Norman Mailer.
- Sanctuary (2002)
- Show & Tell (2002). With and introduction by Henry Louis Gates Jr.
- Sicilian Passage (2003). With an introduction by John Szarkowski.
- In Prison Air, The Cells of Holmesburg Prison (2005)
- On Three Pillars (2007). With text by Phillip Lopate.
- House Calls (2008). With William Carlos Williams. With an accompanying text by Robert Coles.
- Dear Knights and Dark Horses (2010). With an introduction by Alec Wilkinson.
- The Waters of Our Time (2014). With a collaborative text by Giancarlo T. Roma.
- In the Vale of Cashmere (2015). With an introduction by G. Winston James.
- Plato's Dogs (2016). With an introduction by Giancarlo T. Roma.

== Collections ==
Roma's work is held in the following permanent public collections:

- Museum of Modern Art, New York
- San Francisco Museum of Modern Art, CA
- Art Institute of Chicago, CA
- Los Angeles County Museum of Art, CA
