= Sheila Ortiz Taylor =

American writer, poet and novelist

Sheila Ortiz Taylor (born September 25, 1939) is a Mexican-American writer, poet, novelist, literacy critic, and former professor who was born in Los Angeles, California. She is Chicana and has produced multiple novels such as Faultline (1982), Spring Forward/Fall Back (1985), Southbound (1990), and Coachella (1998). Ortiz Taylor started writing poetry in middle school inspired by her family's love for art and expressionism.

== Personal life ==
Ortiz Taylor was born on September 25, 1939, in Los Angeles, California, where she was raised by her mother, aunts, and grandma along with her sister, Sandra Ortiz Taylor. Her parents were Jack Santay Ortiz, a Texan man of Irish and Mexican descent, and Juanita Loretta Ortiz Taylor, who was of Mexican descent. Ortiz Taylor's family dynamic embraced non-traditional gender roles. Ortiz Taylor got her inspiration for writing and poetry in middle school due to her family's love for art as a form of expression. Ortiz Taylor's writings were inspired by her personal life, and she often used her writing to express her feelings and emotions. Ortiz Taylor and her sister, Sandra Ortiz Taylor, were supported by their mother in their individual interests even when they rejected traditional feminine interests like makeup, dresses, dolls, etc. Ortiz Taylor's grandmother helped her envision literature and cooking as intertwined. Her aunts, Julia and Thelma, engaged in gender roles and activities typically reserved for men, which inspired her outlook on gender roles and career choices. Ortiz Taylor's unconventional family dynamic inspired her to pursue arts and literature as a way to express her experiences and worldview after growing up in a Mexican-American household. In addition, both Sheila Ortiz Taylor and Sandra Ortiz Taylor worked on Imaginary Parents (1996) as a collaborative effort to create a family memoir of their experiences growing up.

After graduating from high school, Ortiz Taylor enrolled at the University of California, Los Angeles (UCLA) as an English major with a Spanish minor; however, she did not complete her bachelor's degree until 1963.

In 1958, she married and moved to Iowa, where she worked as a secretary and nurse aide for handicapped children. Soon after, she divorced her husband but was unable to return to her home state due to demands and restrictions regarding her custody battle with her ex-husband. Her ex-husband believed she was unfit to raise their children because of her sexuality and Ortiz Taylor had to see a psychologist.

In 1960, she returned to Los Angeles and re-enrolled at UCLA, where she won the Mabel Wilson Richards Fellowship. In 1961 Ortiz-Taylor transferred to California State University, Northridge, and graduated with honors and a Bachelor's degree in English In 1963 and was named Outstanding Student of Language and Literature. After spending her summer in Europe, Ortiz Taylor returned to UCLA where she received her Master's in 1964 and Ph.D in 1972.

When Ortiz Taylor began writing Faultline (1982), she was initially inspired by her own life, which involved her ex-husband and the fact that their children would grow up in a lesbian household. Her work is critically acclaimed and is used as a reference point in Chicano studies regarding gender and sexuality. Most of her work was as a novelist, but she also worked as an English professor. Faultline was considered the first Chicana lesbian novel published. This trend of relating her experiences to her books was also present in her novel, Southbound where she expands on her ethnic identity and Chicano traditions.

Ortiz Taylor is married to Joy Lynn Lewis. Their family includes five children, and seven grandchildren. Over the past 33 years, Ortiz Taylor and Lewis have taken part in several wedding ceremonies to each other, both legal and otherwise. They currently reside in the Southeastern United States, where Joy Lynn Lewis was born. They are both retired from the Florida education system.

== Faultline ==
Ortiz Taylor's most well-known novel, Faultline, was published in 1982 by the Naiad Press – a lesbian publisher. Faultline centers around a woman who risks losing custody of her children, due to her sexual orientation, and must go to court to plead her case. At the time of publication, Faultline was not an immediate success. As it gained popularity within the global arena, however, the novel was then translated into German, Italian and even had a British edition.

Ortiz Taylor started writing Faultline as a catharsis from her ex-husband's disapproval of her same-sex relationship while she raised their children. Similar to Ortiz Taylor's struggles, Faultline focuses on the protagonist Arden Benbow, a proclaimed lesbian, and the obstacles she faced during a custody battle with her ex-husband Malthus. The novel initially takes place within a courtroom, where Arden speaks to the judge on her behalf, claiming she did nothing wrong as a parent, while Malthus condemns her actions of wanting to be a lesbian mother to their shared children. Further in the novel, as Arden's testimony progresses, she rejects the court's position that there is only a straight line separating accepted and rejected norms. She challenges this viewpoint, which also reflects a patriarchal society's belief, with her evidence that skews this symbolic straight line of norms into one that is more irregular, like that of an earthly faultline, which directly refers to the title. Faultline concludes with Arden winning the custody battle, which redefines what a family can look like in a heteronormative society.

== Other written works ==
In 1990, Ortiz Taylor released Southbound, a sequel to Faultline. Southbound continues with Arden, the main character from Faultline, studying at a Creative Writing Program at UCLA and reminiscing about her history in Los Angeles because she realizes that she might have to find a career outside of California. Her road trip includes places such as Texas, Mexico, and ultimately culminating in Florida. The third book, OutRageous (2006), centers around Arden in Florida, where she faces opposition from the college administration due to her lesbianism but gains support from her community.

Ortiz Taylor also collaborated with her sister, Sandra Ortiz Taylor, to write Imaginary Parents: A Family Autobiography in 1996. The two sisters recount their childhood inspired by real-life experiences and fiction, such as family members’ suicide, their relationship with their mother, Juanita, and their parents' relationship. Sandra Ortiz Taylor contributes to this book through illustrations that give insight into her different perspective of their childhood.

Ortiz Taylor also wrote poetry and articles. One of her articles, “Women in a Double Bind: Hazards of an Argumentative Edge,” discussed the difficulties female students face in college.

Her other works include Spring Forward/Fall Back (1985), which is about a lesbian family as well, Borderlands (1987), Coachella (1998), and Slow Dancing at Miss Polly’s.

== LGBTQ+ identity ==
Ortiz Taylor uses her sexual identity as a primary component of her literary works, with her ethnic background as a Mexican-American coming soon after.

Ortiz Taylor is a lesbian, using her written works, specifically Faultline, as a vessel for her struggles being a part of the LGBTQ+ community. The novel reflects her personal life, using the main character of the novel “Arden”' as a representation of herself. Arden, much like Ortiz Taylor, is a Chicana lesbian mother challenging gender norms and the opposition she faced from those around her, specifically her ex-husband. Not only does her sexual identity challenge gender norms in the United States, but it was also a struggle to grapple with this side of herself in the face of her Chicana identity. The Chicano values emphasize the importance of a unified familia, and the need for la familia to be led by a man and a woman. In addition to the struggle against gender norms, Ortiz Taylor uses Faultline to communicate her belief that individuals have the freedom to create an identity rather than inherit it from previous generations. This thought is reflective of her inner-battles with a traditional Chicano identity, and who she desired to be. Beyond the vague idea of “gender norms,” Ortiz Taylor more specifically tackles ideas of the patriarchy and compulsory heterosexuality in her novel as well. The patriarchy in Arden's personal life is dismantled through her lesbian identity, through her lack of desire or dependency on a male. Subsequently, the main character, Arden's loving relationship with a woman at the end of the book defies the traditional, heterosexual social constructs that she had been expected to fall into all her life.

== Chicana identity ==
Ortiz Taylor is of Mexican-American descent. Her grandmother was a Mexican-American Catholic woman from Los Angeles, and Ortiz Taylor grew up in a household of “fourth–and fifth–generation, middle-class Mexican-Americans.” In her books, Ortiz Taylor explores her Chicana identity through the details of her characters and her use of metaphors. Through Arden in Faultline and Southbound, Ortiz Taylor brings up Arden's Indigenous background, enjoying Mexican traditional and Tex-Mex food, remembering her family speaks Spanish, and the addition of Spanish words in her vocabulary. In Southbound, Ortiz Taylor describes Arden thinking about her connection to an Aztec ancestors and Mexico as her homeland. Critics of Ortiz Taylor view her references to her Chicana heritage as “superficial” because Arden “makes fun of her ‘Indian’ nose.” Critics also mention that her Chicanidad does not play a central role as Ortiz Taylor focuses mainly on lesbianism in her writing. In Imaginary Parents, the Ortiz Sisters reveal more about their Mexican Catholic heritage, eating and learning to cook traditional foods. Reviewers of her trilogy starring Arden note that from the beginning of Faultline to OutRageous, Ortiz Taylor progressively writes more about her heritage.

== Career ==
After attaining her Ph.D. in 1972, Ortiz Taylor was hired as an English Professor at Florida State University, where she received various academic grants and awards. Some of her accolades included the Money for Women/Barbara Deming Memorial Fund Grant, the Teaching Incentive Program Award, the William R. Jones Most Valuable Mentor Award, the University Teaching Award, the Professional Excellence Program Award. During her tenure as a professor, Ortiz Taylor also served as the Director of Women's Studies.

== Sources ==
- Kurzen, Crystal Marie (2004). Collaboration, Collectivity, and Trans/Nationality: Intersectional Affiliation in Child of the Dark by Carolina Maria De Jesus, Dreaming in Cuban by Cristina Garcia, and Imaginary Parents by Sheila Ortiz Taylor and Sandra Ortiz (Thesis). OCLC 885254583.

https://www.tallahassee.com/story/news/local/2014/12/23/no-gay-marriage-licenses-in-leon-for-now/20809245/
