= G. Winston James =

American poet, essayist, editor, and activist

- Born: Glenroy Winston James; Kingston, Jamaica
- Education: Columbia College (BA); Brooklyn College (MFA); Baruch College (MBA)
- Occupation: Poet
- Writing career
- Subject: Poetry

G. Winston James is an American poet, essayist, editor, and activist. His poetry collections include Lyric: Poems Along a Broken Road and The Damaged Good.

== Early life and education ==
James was born Glenroy Winston James in Kingston, Jamaica. At the age of three, he immigrated with his family to the United States in 1971. He spent his formative years in Paterson, New Jersey, and attended Paterson Catholic Regional High School. He obtained a Bachelor's degree in Regional Studies in 1989 from Columbia College, Columbia University, a Master's in Fine Arts fiction from Brooklyn College in 2004, and completed another Master's in Business specializing in Marketing/International Business from the Zicklin School of Business at Baruch College in 2005.

== Career ==
As an activist, James spent part of the 1980s and 1990s working with the New York State Black Gay Network, as a Craig G. Harris fellow, named for the poet and activist who died of AIDS complications in 1993. At Other Countries: Black Gay Expression, a writers' collective founded in 1986 by writer Daniel Garrett, James served as the chair and executive director. In 2002, James was a founding organizer of Fire & Ink: A Writers Festival for Black GLBT Writers.

James's poetry collections include Lyric: Poems Along a Broken Road(Grapevine Press, 1999) and The Damaged Good (Vintage Entity Press, 2007). James's short story collection, Shaming the Devil. was published by his imprint, Top Pen Press in 2009. He is the co-editor with Lisa C. Moore of Spirited: Affirming the Soul and Black Gay/Lesbian Identity (RedBone Press, 2006), and edited, along with the Other Countries collective, Voices Rising: Celebrating 20 Years of Black Lesbian, Gay, Bisexual and Transgender Writing (RedBone Press, 2007). Kenyatta Dorey Graves writes that James vehemently inserts SGL into the discourse of black liberation in general.

James's prose and essays have been published in a variety of anthologies, including Brooklyn Review, Callaloo: A Journal of African American and African Arts and Letters, Fighting Words: Personal Essays by Black Gay Men, For Colored Boys Who Have Considered Suicide When The Rainbow Is Still Not Enough, His 2: Brilliant New Fiction by Gay Writers, Think Again, and Waves: An Anthology of New Gay Fiction. Known primarily as a poet, James's poems can be found in several anthologies including Black Ivy: A Literary and Visual Arts Magazine, Bloom: Queer Fiction, Art, Poetry and More, Freedom in this Village: Twenty-Five Years of Black Gay Men’s Writing, Milking Black Bull: 11 Gay Black Poets, and Role Call: A Generational Anthology of Social & Political Black Art & Literature and two Lambda Literary Award-winning anthologies: Sojourner: Black Gay Voices in the Age of AIDS and The Road Before Us: 100 Gay Black Poets. James wrote the introduction to Thomas Roma's 2015 photography book In the Vale of Cashmere.
