= Douglas Clegg =

American writer (born 1958)

- Born: April 1, 1958 (age 68); Alexandria, Virginia, U.S.
- Education: Washington and Lee University
- Occupations: Novelist, short story writer
- Spouse: Raul Silva (1989–present)
- Writing career
- Genres: Horror, Fantasy, Genre fiction, Dark fantasy
- Website: www.douglasclegg.com

Douglas Clegg (born April 1, 1958) is an American horror and dark fantasy author, and a pioneer in the field of e-publishing. He maintains a strong Internet presence through his website.

== Early life ==
Born in Alexandria, Virginia to a "family of artists", Clegg had "scribbled stories" from a young age and then started typing them at age 8 when his parents brought home a typewriter. One of his first tales was an adventure about his pet mockingbird, which had recently died. His first horror story was for a school assignment at Sleepy Hollow School about St. Patrick's Day, in which snakes take their revenge on St. Patrick and the people of Dublin. Clegg wrote his first novella-length work, called Asylum, at age 17.

Clegg graduated from Washington and Lee University, with a degree in English literature.

== Writing career ==
Clegg finished writing his first novel, Goat Dance, in 1987. Pocket Books published it in 1989, and Goat Dance was nominated for Outstanding First Novel by the Horror Writers Association. Pocket also published his second, third, and fourth novels, Breeder (1990), Neverland (1991) and Dark of the Eye (1994). Clegg's next novel, The Children's Hour (1995), was published by Dell, but the imprint dropped its horror line four months later, leaving him without a publisher. His sixth novel, Bad Karma (1997), written under the pseudonym Andrew Harper, was published by Kensington Books, and later adapted for the screen by Randall Frakes. The resulting 2002 film, directed by John Hough and starring Patsy Kensit, was released as Bad Karma internationally and as Hell's Gate in the United States.

In March 1999, Clegg announced that he would be distributing his new ghost novel Naomi in serial installments via email. Naomi debuted in May 1999 and became the Internet's first publisher-sponsored e-serial. Publishers Weekly called it "arguably, the first major work of fiction to originate in cyberspace." Some four thousand mailing list subscribers received free chapters of Naomi on a weekly basis, boosting print numbers for the 2001 Leisure Books paperback version from the low 50,000 range to over 125,000.

Clegg found a new publishing home with Dorchester's Leisure imprint, a small New York publisher committed to its horror line. Leisure brought out The Halloween Man in 1998, Clegg's short story collection The Nightmare Chronicles, (which won the Bram Stoker Award and the International Horror Guild Award) in 1999, and two novels, You Come When I Call You and Mischief, in 2000. Also that year, Cemetery Dance Publications published the print edition of Clegg's novella Purity, which Clegg had made available for free download on his website, and the author launched another e-book, Nightmare House, which was serialized on a weekly basis on the DouglasClegg mailing list at Onelist.com. A bidding war erupted between three companies for sponsorship of the mailing list for the duration of the serial. Cemetery Dance won, and paid Clegg a five-figure fee for his free email novel, which was published in hardcover the following year. Cemetery Dance also sponsored the Harrow Haunting website, which offered readers multi-media along with the e-book. A Nightmare House sequel, The Infinite, became Leisure's first hardcover in 2001.

Since then, Clegg has published several other novels and collections, including the 2004 Shocker Award-winning collection, The Machinery of Night. His current publishers include Cemetery Dance Publications, Tor Books, Berkley/Ace, Leisure Books, and Wildside Press. Under the pseudonym Andrew Harper, the novels Red Angel and Night Cage also were released.

Clegg's Harrow series includes Nightmare House (1999), Mischief (2000), The Infinite (2001) and The Abandoned (2005), as well as the prequel novellas The Necromancer (2003) and Isis (2006). The Vampyricon trilogy, a dark fantasy series about vampirism and mythology set in an alternate medieval history, includes The Priest of Blood (2005), The Lady of Serpents (2006) and The Queen of Wolves (2007). The Priest of Blood hit the extended New York Times bestseller list in hardcover in late 2005. In 2006 Clegg also began his Mordred trilogy with Mordred, Bastard Son. The novel was nominated for a 2006 Lambda Literary Award for LGBT Science Fiction/Fantasy/Horror.

In 2009, Lonely Road Books announced that they would be publishing The Vampyricon Trilogy: The Definitive Special Edition. The book was scheduled to include all three of the Vampyricon novels, re-edited by the author, as well as an addendum of around 50 to 100 pages of exclusive "deleted scenes" and "lost material" and color and black and white artwork by Erin Wells. Lonely Road announced two editions: a Limited Edition of 300 copies and a Lettered Edition of 52 copies.

== Works ==
=== Harrow novels ===
- Nightmare House (1999)
- Mischief (2000)
- The Infinite (2001)
- The Necromancer (Prequel Novel) (2003)
- The Abandoned (2005)
- Isis (Prequel Novel) (2006)

=== Mordred trilogy ===
- Mordred, Bastard Son (2006)
- Mordred, Dragon Prince (announced)

=== Vampyricon trilogy ===
- The Priest of Blood (2005)
- The Lady of Serpents (2006)
- The Queen of Wolves (2007)
- The Vampyricon Trilogy: The Definitive Special Edition (2016)

=== Standalone novels ===
- Goat Dance (1989)
- Breeder (1990)
- Neverland (1991)
- Dark of the Eye (1994)
- The Children's Hour (1995)
- Bad Karma (Criminally Insane #1) (1997) (As Andrew Harper)
- Naomi (1998)
- The Halloween Man (1998)
- You Come When I Call You (1999)
- The Hour Before Dark (2002)
- Red Angel (Criminally Insane #2) (2003) (As Andrew Harper)
- Night Cage (Criminally Insane #3) (2004) (As Andrew Harper)
- The Attraction (2004)
- Afterlife (2004)
- Dinner With the Cannibal Sisters (2014)

=== Collections ===
- The Nightmare Chronicles (1999)
- The Machinery of Night (2004)
- Wild Things: Four Tales (2006)
- Night Asylum: Tales of Mystery and Horror (2012) (E-book only)
- Lights Out: Collected Stories (2014) (E-book only)

=== Selected short fiction and essays ===
- "White Chapel" (1994), short story in the anthology Year's Best Fantasy and Horror, Volume 8
- "O, Rare and Most Exquisite" (1996), short story in Year's Best Fantasy and Horror, Volume 10
- "I Am Infinite, I Contain Multitudes" (1997), short story in Year's Best Fantasy and Horror, Volume 11
- Purity (2000), novella
- The Words (2002), a novella in the anthology Four Dark Nights
- The Necromancer (2003), Harrow prequel novella
- "A Madness of Starlings" (2004), short story in Cemetery Dance magazine #50
- Isis (2006), Harrow prequel novella
- "Introduction" (2013), for Mary Shelley's Frankenstein, Signet Classics edition

== Adaptations ==
Clegg's 1997 novel Bad Karma (1997) was adapted by Randall Frakes into the 2002 film Bad Karma, with no participation from Clegg. Directed by John Hough and starring Patsy Kensit, the film was released as Hell's Gate in the United States. In a 2012 interview, Clegg praised Kensit's performance but noted, "in general it’s not a very good movie."

Several of Clegg's other works have been optioned for film, including The Attraction, The Hour Before Dark, Dark of the Eye and The Children’s Hour, but none have yet to be produced.

== Critical reception ==
Horror author Peter Straub said of Clegg in 2002, "Douglas Clegg has become the new star in horror fiction, and The Hour Before Dark is his best and most exciting novel to date. This is pure imagination, and it is wearing speed skates." Publishers Weekly called The Hour Before Dark "suspenseful and relentlessly spooky" and "at once the most artful and most mainstream tale yet from one of horror's brightest lights." Publishers Weekly also singled out The Words, Clegg's contribution to the 2002 novella anthology Four Dark Nights, as the only entry which "uses its expansive length to build the atmosphere and tension crucial for orchestrating its unsettling events."

== Awards and nominations ==
| Year | Award | Result | Category | Work/Citation |
|---|---|---|---|---|
| 1989 | Bram Stoker Award | Nominated | Best First Novel | Goat Dance |
| 1997 | Bram Stoker Award | Nominated | Best Short Fiction | "I Am Infinite, I Contain Multitudes" (Year's Best Fantasy and Horror, Volume 11) |
| 1998 | International Horror Guild Award | Nominated | Best Novel | The Halloween Man |
| 1999 | Bram Stoker Award | Won | Best Fiction Collection | The Nightmare Chronicles |
| 1999 | International Horror Guild Award | Won | Best Collection | The Nightmare Chronicles |
| 2000 | International Horror Guild Award | Nominated | Best Novel | You Come When I Call |
| 2002 | Bram Stoker Award | Nominated | Best Novel | The Hour Before Dark |
| 2002 | International Horror Guild Award | Nominated | Best Novel | The Hour Before Dark |
| 2003 | Bram Stoker Award | Nominated | Best Long Fiction | The Necromancer |
| 2004 | Bram Stoker Award | Nominated | Best Short Fiction | "A Madness of Starlings" (Cemetery Dance magazine #50) |
| 2004 | Bram Stoker Award | Nominated | Best Fiction Collection | The Machinery of Night |
| 2006 | International Horror Guild Award | Nominated | Best Long Form | Isis |
| 2006 | Lambda Literary Award | Nominated | LGBT Science Fiction/Fantasy/Horror | Mordred, Bastard Son |

== Personal life ==
Clegg lives in Connecticut with his husband and business partner, Raul Silva. After 16 years together, Clegg and Silva were joined in a civil union on November 17, 2005. They were legally married on November 17, 2008. The couple have a menagerie of rescued pets and enjoy canoeing, hiking and bicycling.
