= Steven Fales =

American dramatist

Steven Heard Fales
- Born: March 17, 1970 (age 56); Provo, Utah, US
- Education: Boston Conservatory; Brigham Young University; University of Connecticut
- Occupations: Playwright; Actor

Steven Heard Fales (born March 17, 1970) is a classically trained playwright and actor who has gained broad recognition in both the theatre world gay community and the LDS community for his award-winning one-man play, Confessions of a Mormon Boy.

== Performance ==
The first reading of Confessions was at the Sunstone Symposium in Salt Lake City in 2001. He has performed the play off-Broadway (under director Jack Hofsiss) and across the United States and internationally at the Edinburgh Festival Fringe and London's West End. The book Confessions of a Mormon Boy: Behind the Scenes of the Off-Broadway Hit was a Lambda Literary Award finalist. Before becoming a solo artist he performed in Shakespeare and musicals in regional theatres across America.

Confessions of a Mormon Boy is Part One in The Mormon Boy Trilogy. Part Two and Three are called Missionary Position and Prodigal Dad. Mormon-American Princess is his cabaret act and deals with the subject of narcissism. It premiered in San Francisco and has played Joe's Pub, New York City. Other solo shows include Conversations with Heavenly Mother: An Uncommon Diva, Joseph III, CULT!, and When All Else Fales. He is the founder of the Solo Performance Alliance.

== Personal life ==
Fales was born in Provo, Utah, and raised in California and later Las Vegas, Nevada. He first trained at the Boston Conservatory on scholarship and after serving a two-year mission for the LDS Church in Portugal transferred to Brigham Young University, where he received his BFA in musical theatre. He received his MFA in acting from the University of Connecticut. He has further trained at The American Comedy Institute and has studied privately with acting coach Larry Moss.

He lives in Salt Lake City with his two children.

== See also ==
- Homosexuality and The Church of Jesus Christ of Latter-day Saints
