= Robert Westfield =

American writer (born 1972)

- Born: 1972 (age 53–54); Maryland
- Education: Columbia University
- Occupation: Novelist
- Writing career
- Period: 2000s–present
- Notable work: Suspension
- Website: www.robertwestfield.com

Robert Westfield (born 1972) is an American writer, who won two Lambda Literary Awards in 2007 for his debut novel Suspension. The novel, published in 2006 by Harper Perennial, was nominated for and won Lambdas in the categories of Gay Fiction and Gay Debut Fiction.

Born in 1972 in Maryland, Westfield attended Columbia University in New York City, earning a degree in Theatre and English, and winning several student awards for his writing.

Since 1997, Westfield has run tours across New York City. He has also designed video and audio tours of the city.

He has also written several plays, including A Wedding Album, The Pennington Plot, A Tulip Economy and A Home Without, as well as acting as cowriter and dramaturg for plays by Marc Wolf, including Blessed Plot and Another American: Asking and Telling.

His second novel,The Sightseers, was published by Storied City in May 2021. He has uncoming non-fiction anthologies of NYC-based stories coming out in 2026 and 2027.
