= Joe Keenan (writer) =

American dramatist (born 1958)

- Born: July 14, 1958 (age 68); Cambridge, Massachusetts, U.S.
- Education: Boston College High School
- Alma mater: Columbia University (BA)
- Occupations: Screenwriter, television producer, novelist
- Known for: Frasier; Desperate Housewives
- Works: Blue Heaven; Putting on the Ritz; My Lucky Star
- Spouse: Gerry Bernardi

Joe Keenan (born July 14, 1958) is an American screenwriter, television producer and novelist. Notable for his television work on series such as Frasier and Desperate Housewives, Keenan has been referred to as the "gay P.G. Wodehouse" for his three successful novels.

== Early life ==
Keenan was born in Cambridge, Massachusetts into an Irish American Catholic family. He has a twin brother, John, and two other siblings, Ronald and Geraldine. He grew up in the blue collar neighborhood of Cambridgeport. Keenan attended Boston College High School and Columbia College.

== Early career ==
In 1991 Cheers creators James Burrows and Glen and Les Charles, having read Keenan's novel Blue Heaven, invited Keenan to create a new sitcom for their production company. The resulting pilot, Gloria Vane, starring JoBeth Williams, was not picked up by a network, but it led to a writing post on Frasier. In 1992, his first play, The Times, a musical that charts the course of a seventeen-year marriage between Liz, an actress, and Ted, a writer, won the Richard Rodgers Award for Musical Theater, awarded by the American Academy of Arts and Letters. In 1993, the lyrics for The Times won the Edward Kleban Award.

== Frasier ==
He joined the staff of the sitcom Frasier as an executive story editor in 1994 for the series' second year. His first produced script for the series, "The Matchmaker", received an Emmy Award nomination, a GLAAD Media Award, and the 1995 Writers Guild Award for Episodic Comedy. He won a writing Emmy Award in 1996 for being one of eight writers of the Season 3 episode "Moon Dance." He received Emmy Award nominations for "The Ski Lodge" episode in 1998 and, with Christopher Lloyd in 2000, "Something Borrowed, Someone Blue," which won the 2001 WGA award for Episodic Comedy.

During his six-season tenure on Frasier he rose through the ranks from executive story editor to co-producer, supervising producer, co-executive producer, and finally, executive producer. He was executive producer when the series ended in 2004. He also co-wrote the series finale, "Goodnight, Seattle." Keenan won five Emmy Awards during his tenure on the show. He was nominated for Outstanding Writing in a Comedy Series five times, and won once. He won the Outstanding Comedy Series award four times for his work as the show's producer. He also won two Writers Guild of America Awards for his work on the series.

== Desperate Housewives and other work ==
In 2006, Keenan joined Desperate Housewives as a writer and executive producer for the third season of the television show. Although his work received good critical response, and one of his episodes,"Bang", was named the best of the season by many critics, he left the series after one year.

Keenan also created two short-lived comedy series with fellow Frasier producer and writer Christopher Lloyd: Bram & Alice in 2002 and Out of Practice in 2005. He also co-wrote the 1994 film Sleep with Me as well as the screenplay for the 2007 Annie Award-winning animated feature Flushed Away.

== Fiction ==
Keenan is also a published author, and has been referred to as a "gay P.G. Wodehouse". As of 2007, he had written three novels:

- Blue Heaven (1988),
- Putting On the Ritz (1991), and
- My Lucky Star (2006).

Putting on the Ritz won the Lambda Literary Award for Humor in 1991, and My Lucky Star won the Lambda Literary Award for Humor in 2006. In October 2007, the novel also won the Thurber Prize for American Humor.

== Personal life ==
Keenan lives in Los Angeles. He has been with his husband, Gerry Bernardi, since 1982.

== Filmography ==
Year	Title	Writer	Producer	Executive producer	Notes	Network
1995–2004	Frasier	Yes	Yes	No	Executive/Co-executive producer of 48 episodes Writer of 24 episodes	NBC
2002	Bram & Alice	Yes	No	No		CBS
2005–2006	Out of Practice	Yes	No	Yes	Creator/Executive Producer of 22 episodes Writer of 4 episodes	CBS
2006–2011	Desperate Housewives	Yes	Consulting	Yes	Executive Producer of 10 episodes Consulting producer of 55 episodes Writer of 7 episodes	ABC
2012–2014	Glee	No	Consulting	No	Consulting Producer of 15 episodes	Fox
2013	Hot in Cleveland	Yes	No	No	Writer of 2 episodes	TV Land
2013	Sean Saves the World	Yes	Consulting	No	Consulting Producer of 2 episodes Writer of 2 episodes	NBC
2015–2017	The Odd Couple	Yes	Consulting	No	Consulting Producer of 46 episodes Writer of 1 episode	CBS
2019–2021	Why Women Kill	Yes	Consulting	No	Consulting Producer of 9 episodes Writer of 4 episodes	Paramount+
