= Stuart Timmons =

American historian (1957–2017)

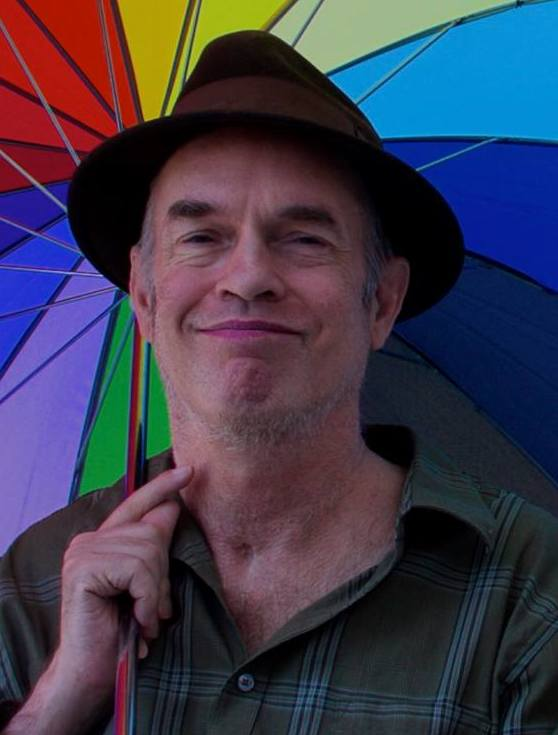
- Timmons during his West Hollywood History Tour 2015
- Born: January 14, 1957; Minneapolis, Minnesota, U.S.
- Died: January 28, 2017 (aged 60); Hollywood, California, U.S.
- Occupations: writer, historian
- Writing career
- Language: English
- Genres: Short stories, non-fiction, history
- Subject: LGBT history
- Notable works: The Trouble With Harry Hay: Founder of the Modern Gay Movement; Gay L.A.: A History of Sexual Outlaws, Power Politics, and Lipstick Lesbians
- Notable awards: Lambda Literary Award for Arts & Culture, Lambda Literary Award for LGBT Nonfiction
- Website: stuarttimmons.com

Stuart Timmons (January 14, 1957 – January 28, 2017) was an American journalist, activist, historian, and award-winning author specializing in LGBT history based in Los Angeles, California. He was the author of The Trouble With Harry Hay: Founder of the Modern Gay Movement and the co-author of Gay L.A.: A History of Sexual Outlaws, Power Politics, and Lipstick Lesbians with Lillian Faderman.

== Early life ==
Timmons was born on January 14, 1957, in Cottagewood Hospital in Minneapolis, Minnesota. He has two sisters, Gay and Emily Timmons, both in the SF Bay Area. While he was still a toddler, his family moved to Santa Barbara due to his father getting a new job.

Timmons received his Bachelor of Arts in film from the University of California, Los Angeles (UCLA). While he was a student at UCLA, he co-founded the gay festival on campus with John Ramirez in 1979; it later became known as Outfest.

== Career ==
Through his career Timmons wrote and edited for magazines, documentary films and non-fiction literature. While at UCLA, where he majored in film, his work as an activist impressed Mark Thompson, who was then the senior editor of The Advocate, a national gay and lesbian news magazine. Thompson hired Timmons as a journalist for the magazine.

Timmons was the author of The Trouble With Harry Hay: Founder of the Modern Gay Movement, published in 1990. With lesbian historian Lillian Faderman, he co-authored Gay L.A.: A History of Sexual Outlaws, Power Politics, And Lipstick Lesbians, published in 2006. It chronicles the history of gays and lesbians in Los Angeles since the late 1700s.

Timmons served as the executive director of the ONE National Gay & Lesbian Archives and served on its board of directors. In 2007, he began developing walking tours of LGBTQ historic sites in Los Angeles. He finished tours of Downtown Los Angeles and Silver Lake, Los Angeles, but experienced a severe cerebellar stroke in January 2008 before he could complete his West Hollywood edition.

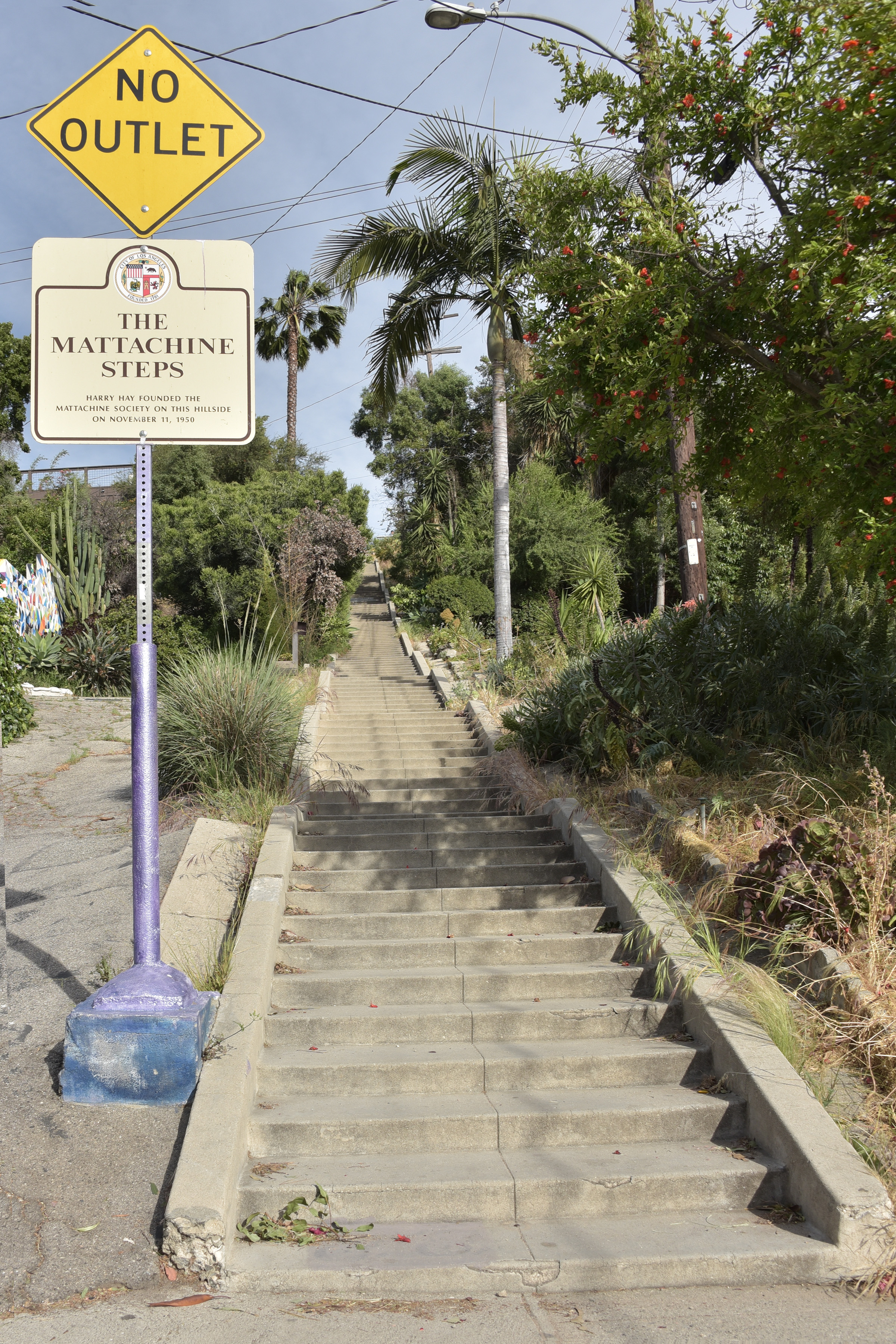
The Mattachine Steps.

With a grant from the City of West Hollywood, Los Angeles-based performance artist Jason Jenn helped Timmons complete and produce the City of West Hollywood LGBTQ History Tour in celebration of the city's 30th Anniversary in 2015. The walking tour was also adapted into a self-guided mobile app. The walking tour included live performances of historical information including the talents of comedian Kristina Wong, and Justin Sayer (a writer for 2 Broke Girls and stand-up comedian). He was a co-organizer of the dedication of the Mattachine Steps in Silver Lake named for the Mattachine Society on April 7, 2012, alongside Mark Thompson, Wes Joe, Mitch O'Farrell, and Eric Garcetti (then a councilor and later mayor of Los Angeles).

Timmons received a nomination for gay non-fiction from the American Library Association for his first book in 1990. For his book with Faderman, he received the Monette-Horwitz Award for LGBT Scholarship, the Lambda Literary Award, LGBT Non-Fiction and the Lambda Literary Award, LGBT Arts and Culture in 2007.

== Later life and death ==
Timmons was openly gay. He suffered a stroke in 2008 which greatly diminished his cognitive function. Timmons died on January 28, 2017, at the Serrano North Convalescent Hospital in Hollywood, California, from cardiac arrest, at the age of 60. An intimate memorial was held at ONE National Gay & Lesbian Archives.

== Bibliography ==
- Timmons, Stuart (1990). The Trouble With Harry Hay: Founder of the Modern Gay Movement. Boston, Massachusetts: Alyson Books. ISBN 9781555831752. OCLC 22274397.
- Faderman, Lillian; Timmons, Stuart (2006). Gay L.A.: A History of Sexual Outlaws, Power Politics, and Lipstick Lesbians. New York: Basic Books. ISBN 9780465022885. OCLC 70707762.

== Filmography ==
- Hope Along the Wind: The Story of Harry Hay – co-writer and historical consultant.
