= Lisa C. Moore =

American publisher and editor

Lisa C. Moore is an American publisher and editor. From 1997 to 2024, she ran the publisher RedBone Press, which focused on black, LGBTQ authors. Its inaugural title, edited by Moore—Does Your Mama Know? An Anthology of Black Lesbian Coming Out Stories—won two Lambda Literary Awards.

== Early life and education ==
Lisa C. Moore was born in New Orleans. Her father is the musician Deacon John Moore, and her family has deep roots in rural Louisiana.

She obtained a degree in business administration from Louisiana State University. Then, in the mid-1990s, she studied journalism at Georgia State University, graduating with a second bachelor's degree. In this period, she worked as a copy editor at the Atlanta Journal-Constitution and other publications.

== Career ==
In 1997, Moore founded the small publisher RedBone Press. Having come out as a lesbian in the 1980s, Moore noticed a lack of writing about black women's coming-out stories. So for RedBone's inaugural title, in 1997, Moore edited Does Your Mama Know? An Anthology of Black Lesbian Coming Out Stories, which won a Lambda Literary Award for Lesbian Studies and another Lambda Award in the Small Press category. The book featured 49 coming-out stories from 41 writers.

Initially a black lesbian publisher, RedBone expanded to celebrate and commemorate the wider black LGBTQ community. Moore published such books as Sharon Bridgforth's The Bull-Jean Stories in 1998. She later reprinted works like Joseph Beam's In the Life and Brother to Brother.

Moore moved to Austin to obtain a master's degree in anthropology in the African diaspora from the University of Texas, graduating in 2000. For her thesis, she filmed interviews with black lesbian elders. She continued operating RedBone in Austin before settling in the Washington, D.C., area, where the press found a longtime home.

In 2006, Moore co-edited Spirited: Affirming the Soul and Black Gay/Lesbian Identity with G. Winston James. The book compiles 40 personal essays about the spiritual experience of lesbian and gay African Americans. The following year, she co-edited Carry the Word: A Bibliography of Black LGBTQ Books. Around 2011, she executive produced and wrote the feature documentary The Untitled Black Lesbian Elder Project.

Moore co-founded and served as board president of the Afro-descendent LGBT writers' organization Fire & Ink. She also edited the Lambda Literary Foundation's Lambda Book Report.

In 2002, Moore's apartment and much of her archives were destroyed in a fire, but she continued to operate RedBone. In 2016, she was given the inaugural Lambda Literary Publishing Professional Award for her contributions.

Then, Moore returned to school once again, earning a master's of library and information science from the Catholic University of America in 2019. In 2020, she moved back to New Orleans, where she became a reference archivist at the Amistad Research Center, and brought RedBone Press with her. The press wound down its operations in 2024.
