= My Lucky Star (novel) =

2006 novel by Joe Keenan

- Author: Joe Keenan
- Language: English
- Genre: Novel
- Published: 2006 Little, Brown & Company
- Publication place: United States
- Media type: Print
- Pages: 361
- ISBN: 978-0-316-06019-6 (1st edition)
- Preceded by: Putting on the Ritz

My Lucky Star (2006) is the third book by novelist Joe Keenan. It is a gay-themed comedy about three friends who get caught up with the movie business, blackmail, and handsome male closeted movie stars.

My Lucky Star won the Lambda Literary Award for humor in 2006. It won the prestigious Thurber Prize for American Humor in October 2007.

== Plot summary ==
Gilbert Selwyn's mother has remarried once more—this time to a successful but aging Hollywood producer. Gilbert, ever the schemer, lifted a few plot points from Casablanca (i.e., plagiarized the entire film and put a new title on it) and convinced his new stepfather to promote the script to actor Stephen Donato's producer. Gilbert convinces his friends, Philip Cavanaugh and Claire Simmons, to move to Hollywood to help him rewrite the script. They quickly uncover his deception. But since Gilbert told the studio executives that the script was mostly Philip and Claire's, they must help rewrite the screenplay or else find any chance of a career ruined.

Claire refuses to go along with the stunt, but Gilbert offers her the chance of a lifetime: Gilbert's agent, having heard of their success selling a screenplay, has offered the trio a chance to write actress Diana Malenfant's new film. The movie will be the first time Diana and her son, Stephen Donato, have acted together on screen since Stephen was 10, and it may prove the jump-start to Diana's career which she's been searching for.

Gilbert is able to wrangle an appointment with Diana Malenfant, who is not particularly interested. But Lily, her drunken and estranged sister, is writing a tell-all book. Philip convinces Diana and Stephen that he has a job assisting Lily with her memoirs, and that he could find out what Lily intends to say in her book. Shrewdly, Diana agrees to hire Gilbert, Philip and Claire to write her new film while Philip spies on Lily.

Stephen, who is gay, soon makes a secret rendezvous with Philip. He's worried that Aunt Lily might attempt to out him in her book. Stephen convinces Philip that he should not only spy on Lily but actually sabotage the book. Philip agrees. Lily's older brother, former child actor Monty Malenfant (and an openly gay man), is suspicious of Philip but goes along to keep Lily happy.

As if events were not complicated enough, Moira Finch suddenly shows up at Gilbert, Philip and Claire's home. She has heard about their deal with Diana Malenfant, and threatens to expose them as frauds. But Moira offers the three a deal: Moira has recently opened a ritzy Hollywood spa, but is lacking clients and cachet. Get Stephen Donato to show up for a free weekend at her spa, and Moira will forget all about how "Casablanca" happened to be sold (again) to one of Hollywood's biggest producers.

Philip soon finds that Monty is on to him. Monty confirms that Stephen is indeed a homosexual, which thrills Philip and leads to numerous fantasies. But Monty also threatens to expose Philip to Diana. Monty offers him a deal: Philip helps Lily turn her book into a best-seller, and nothing will be said to Diana.

Now Claire, Philip and Gilbert are caught in a bind. How do they help Lily while also ruining any chance her book might have? And what of Moira? Claire begins to suspect that her spa isn't quite what it seems, for Moira has far too much money and too many friends. The trio quickly get caught in a downward spiral of sex, closeted movie stars, hustlers, blackmail, secret videotape, a homophobic district attorney, a cute bartender, false fire alarms, car theft, impersonating a police officer, a sleazy public-access television host and a "night with Oscar" that has nothing to do with the Academy Awards.

== Characters ==
- Gilbert Selwyn, an over-sexed gay New Yorker and best friend of Philip Cavanaugh. Gilbert is perpetually poor, but constantly scheming to make a quick buck. Gilbert longs to be a writer, but sloth causes him to never put pen to paper.
- Philip Cavanaugh, Gilbert's long-suffering best friend and fellow New Yorker. Once Gilbert's teenage boyfriend (until an unfortunate case of crabs, caught from one of Gilbert's many sugar daddies, broke them up), Philip is a struggling writer with only minimal talent. Reluctant to be part of Gilbert's schemes, he usually gives in because he longs for money, fame and "the good life."
- Claire Simmons, Philip's other (heterosexual) best friend. Claire is a struggling writer with a modicum of talent, a zaftig figure, and a deep loathing for Gilbert Selwyn. Claire is the most level-headed of Philip's friends, and usually gets him out of Gilbert-caused jams. Claire and Philip are constantly collaborating on the Next Big Novel or Play.
- Moira Finch, a fellow New Yorker and mooch. Moira has dreams of glory but no class (she once invested her entire trust fund in designer pasta). Although Gilbert, Philip and Claire hate Moira, they never quite seem able to avoid running into her and getting blackmailed into participating in her (often illegal) schemes.
- Monty Malenfant, the youngest Malenfant offspring. Monty was a child actor in the 1950s who enjoyed brief fame before his sexual affairs with various young men forced him out of the business. He became a successful real estate investor, and lives in Hollywood with his younger sister, Lily.
- Lily Malenfant, the second-eldest Malenfant child. Lily, too, enjoyed brief fame as a child actor, primarily in sickly-sweet melodramas. But Lily soon was eclipsed by her younger sister, Diana, and remains a has-been. She lives with Monty, spending her days getting gently drunk.
- Diana Malenfant, a former child actor and eldest of the Malenfants, she won her first Academy Award as a teenager and has had a strong career ever since. She married Italian actor Roberto Donato, who promptly died in an automobile accident and left Diana pregnant and single. She has thanked him ever since.
- Stephen Donato, Diana's son. The current reigning action-hero mega-hunk of Hollywood, Stephen made his film debut at age 10 and was nominated for an Oscar. His mother was not. She refused to let him act again until he was 22. His most famous role is that of Caliber, a James Bond-like super-spy. Although dogged for years by rumors that he's gay (he is), he recently married supermodel Gina Beach.

== Reviews ==
My Lucky Star was not widely reviewed in the mainstream press at the time of its release. Some major newspapers did critique the book, however.

Keenan has often been called a "gay P. G. Wodehouse." In that vein, Publishers Weekly called My Lucky Star "a comic masterpiece that...rivals the best of Wodehouse." The review said the book should appeal to all audiences, and claimed it was a "tour de force." In the United Kingdom, the respected The Times observed, "This is sophisticated, deliciously camp entertainment."

The New York Daily News pointed out that readers might be overwhelmed by the elaborate and numerous plot twists and the broadly-drawn caricatures that are the novel's characters. "But that's nitpicking, really," reviewer Joe Dziemianowicz wrote. "In the end, Keenan's twinkly prose keeps you firmly tethered to his 'Lucky Star.'"

The Washington Post was more equivocal, however. Reviewer Debra Weinstein applauded Keenan for capturing the way Hollywood insiders speak, subtly attack one another, and fixate on failure, and for documenting the inner lives of older gay men. But the Post found the humor to be shtick not literature, far too misogynist, and too stereotypical.

The New York Times was even less kind. Although reviewer Mark Kamine noted that "Keenan gets off some decent one-liners" and that references to Los Angeles landmarks were "made sparingly and used to good effect", he felt the book engaged in "incessant name-dropping," that many of the jokes were too topical, and that Keenan's humor was too blunt. "[T]here's no need for canned laughter either. We get enough of that elsewhere."
