= Timothy James Beck =

American novelist pseudonym

Timothy James Beck is the collective pseudonym of four 21st-century American novelists — Timothy Forry, Timothy J. Lambert, Jim Carter, and Becky Cochrane — whose collaborative fiction focuses primarily on homosexuals, drag queens, other sexual minorities, and their families and friends. Beck's work is mostly set in Manhattan.

Beck's 2006 novel Someone Like You was a finalist for the 2007 Lambda Literary Awards in the Gay Romance category.

The four writers met online and started writing together in a tandem fiction experiment. When friends and contacts began following their Manhattan tales and asking for more in the manner of Armistead Maupin's readers, they sought and found an agent and publisher. At the beginning, two of the writers lived in Manhattan, one in Texas, and one in California. In time, the two New Yorkers have moved to Connecticut and Texas.

== Work ==
In addition to their Timothy James Beck novels, the individual writers have had short stories published in Best Gay Love Stories 2005, Best Gay Love Stories 2006, Best Gay Love Stories: New York CIty (2006), Fool For Love: New Gay Fiction (2009), and Midnight Thirsts: Erotic Tales of the Vampire (2004).

Lambert and Cochrane cowrote the novels The Deal (2004) and Three Fortunes in One Cookie (2005), as well as edited Fool For Love: New Gay Fiction (2009). Their second anthology Foolish Hearts: New Gay Fiction was released by Cleis Press in January 2014, and their third anthology, Best Gay Romance 2014, was released by Cleis Press in February 2014.

== Bibliography ==
- It Had To Be You (2001), (ISBN 1575668890 / 978-1575668895) -- Gay romantic comedy. A female impersonator whose act ends when Princess Diana dies is looking for a new job and a new boyfriend—maybe in the same place!
- He's The One (2003), (ISBN 0758203233 / 978-0758203236) -- Gay romantic comedy. Perfect Midwestern hunk/computer geek Adam finds new friends, career challenges, and maybe the love of his life when he accepts a temporary job in Manhattan.
- I'm Your Man (2004), (ISBN 0758207875 / 978-0758207876) -- Gay romantic comedy. Everything falls apart for gay super couple Daniel and Blaine. Can they put it all back together with a little help from their friends?
- Someone Like You (2006), (ISBN 0758210353 / 978-0758210357) -- Friends/romantic comedy. A group of gay and straight friends working and living in Indiana supermall "Mall of the Universe" must overcome obstacles from their pasts, vindictive bosses, and trust issues to find friendship and romance.
- When You Don't See Me (2007), (ISBN 0758216866 / 978-0758216861) -- Gay coming of age. Nineteen-year-old Nick Dunhill navigates his way through jobs, friends, lovers, and family in post-September 11 Manhattan.
