= Sharon Bridgforth =

American theatre writer (born 1958)

- Born: May 15, 1958 (age 68); Chicago, Illinois, U.S.
- Occupation: Writer/theatre artist
- Writing career
- Subjects: Jazz, blues, African-American and black diaspora history, gender and sexuality, theatrical jazz aesthetic
- Notable works: the bull-jean stories, love conjure/blues
- Notable awards: Lambda Literary Award, Alpert/Hedgebrook Residency Prize
- Website: sharonbridgforth.com/content/

Sharon Bridgforth (born May 15, 1958, in Chicago, Illinois) is an American writer working in theater.

== Early life ==
Bridgforth was born in Cook County Hospital in Chicago, Illinois, and moved to South Central Los Angeles when she was 3 years old. She discovered the diversity of the city during her long bus commutes to school.

== Career ==
From 1993 to 1998, Bridgforth worked as the founder, writer, and artistic director of the root wy'mn theatre company. root wy'mn's touring roster included: the Michigan Womyn's Music Festival, The Theater Offensive in Boston, La Peña Cultural Center in Berkeley, California, and the Walker Art Center in Minneapolis.

From 2002 to 2009, she served as the anchor artist for the Austin Project, produced by Omi Osun Joni L. Jones and the John L. Warfield Center for African and African American Studies, University of Texas at Austin. Her work, "Finding Voice Facilitation Method" was published in Experiments in a Jazz Aesthetic Art, Activism, Academia, and the Austin Project edited by Osun Joni L. Jones, Lisa L. Moore, and herself.

In 2008, Bridgforth received a National Performance Network Creation Fund award, for delta dandi, co-commissioned by Women & Their Work, in partnership with the National Performance Network. Freedom Train Productions in New York presented a reading of the work in 2008. A workshop production of the work was produced in 2009 at the Long Center in Austin, Texas.

At Northwestern University, as the Andrew W. Mellon Foundation artist-in-residence in the performance studies department, Bridgforth presented a workshop production of delta dandi during the 2009 Solo/Black/Woman performance series. Since 2009, Bridgforth has been resident playwright at New Dramatists, New York. Her work blood pudding, was presented in the 2010 New York Summerstage festival.

She was the 2010–2012 Visiting Multicultural Faculty member at the Theatre School at DePaul University and is the curator of the Theatrical Jazz Institute at Links Hall, produced by the school, Links Hall and herself.

In 2022, Bridgforth was featured in the book 50 Key Figures in Queer US Theatre, with a profile written by theatre scholar T. Chester.

=== the bull-jean stories ===
Published by RedBone Press, the bull-jean stories give cultural documentation and social commentary on African-American herstory and survival. Set in the rural South of the 1920s through the 1940s, the bull-jean stories uses traditional storytelling and nontraditional verse to chronicle the course of love returning in the lifetimes of one woman-loving-woman named bull-dog-jean.

=== Love Conjure/Blues ===
Both a performance and a novel, Love Conjure/Blues places the fiction-form inside a traditional Black American voice, inviting dramatic interpretation and movement within a highly literary text: It is filled with folktales, poetry, haints, prophecy, song, and oral history. Love Conjure/Blues was also published by RedBone Press.

=== dat Black Mermaid Man Lady ===
Exists as a show, oracle deck, performance/novel, performance, sung children's book, and artistic mentorship towards homeownership. The performance celebrates the different embodiments of gender through the journey of three characters alongside Yoburba deities Oya, Osun, and Yemaya. The show premiered at the Pillsbury House + Theater in Minneapolis, MN, on May 30, 2018, and ran through June 17, 2018. The performance was written by Sharon Bridgforth, directed by Ebony Noelle Golden, with dramaturgy by Alexis Pauline Gumbs, and vocal composition by Mankwe Ndosi.

In addition to a performance, "dat Black Mermaid Man Lady" is an oracle deck. The deck consists of characters from the performance/novel and features artwork by Yasmin Hernandez. The oracle deck is a working deck that Bridgforth used for a series of weekly readings.

Partnering with Powderhorn Park Neighborhood Association and City of Lakes Community Land Trust, Bridgforth worked with five to seven emerging artist of color to create new works and more toward homeownership.

== Awards, residences, and grants ==
In 1997, Bridgforth's script no mo blues was nominated for an Osborn Award (sponsored by the American Theatre Critic's Association). The bull-jean stories won a Lambda Literary Prize for "Best Book by a Small Press" in 1998. The collection also received a nomination for a Lambda Literary Prize in the category of "Best Lesbian Fiction" and a nomination from the 1998 American Library Association for "Best Gay/Lesbian Book". Bridgforth was nominated for the 2002–2003 Alpert Award in the theatre category. She has received the 2000 Penumbra Theatre (St. Paul, MN) Playwriting Fellowship and 2001 YWCA Woman Of The Year in Arts Award in Austin, Texas.

A recipient of the 2008 Alpert/Hedgebrook Residency Prize, her work has been supported by the National Endowment for the Arts commissioning program; the National Endowment for the Arts/Theatre Communications Group, playwright-in-residence program; National Performance Network commissioning and community fund; the Paul Robeson Fund for Independent Media; and the Rockefeller Foundation Multi-Arts Production Fund Award. Bridgforth was also the recipient of the Creative Capital Performing Arts Award in 2016.

== Personal life ==
She has a daughter, Sonja Perryman, from a past marriage. A lesbian, her partner is Omi Osun Joni L. Jones. Jones also has a daughter, Leigh Gaymon-Jones, from a past marriage.

== Works ==
=== Selected publications ===
- "The love conjure/blues Text Installation" script, anthologized in Blacktino Queer Performance, Northwestern University Press (2016), ISBN 978-0-8223-7465-7
- "delta dandi", anthologized in solo black woman performance, Northwestern University Press (2013), ISBN 978-0-8101-2947-4
- Excerpt from "con flama", anthologized in Windy City Queer: LGBTQ Dispatches from the Third Coast, University of Wisconsin Press (2011), ISBN 978-0-299-28404-6
- Writing exercises are featured in Wingbeats: Exercises and Practice in Poetry, edited by Scott Wiggerman and David Meischen. Dos Gatos Press, ISBN 978-0-9760051-9-3
- Experiments in a Jazz Aesthetic: Art, Activism, Academia, and the Austin Project, (ed. with Lisa L. Moore and Omi Osun Joni L. Jones), University of Texas Press (2010), ISBN 978-0-292-72287-3
- "Litany-Blood In The Soil/Texas", anthologized in A Students' Treasury of Texas Poetry, Texas A&M University Consortium Press (2007), ISBN 978-0-87565-353-2
- "a wo'mn called sir", anthologized in First Person Queer: Who We Are (So Far), Arsenal Pulp Press (2007), ISBN 978-1-55152-227-2
- excerpt "dyke/warrior-Prayers", anthologized in Voices Rising: Celebrating 20 Years Of Black Lesbian, Gay, Bisexual And Transgender Writing, Other Countries and RedBone Press (2006), ISBN 978-0-9786251-3-9
- "Street/Angels & Clarity", anthologized in Check The Rhyme: An Anthology Of Female Poets & Emcees, Lit Noire Publishing (2006), ISBN 978-0-9719052-3-8
- "interlude #21: the road to Higher Power", anthologized in Spirited: Affirming the Soul and Black Gay Lesbian Identity, RedBone Press (2006), ISBN 978-0965665933
- "Doña Julia", anthologized in Red Light Superheroes, Saints, and Sluts, Arsenal Pulp Press (2005), ISBN 978-1-55152-184-8
- Love Conjure/Blues, Redbone Press (2004), ISBN 978-0-9656659-6-4
- excerpt from "con flama", anthologized in New Monologues For Women By Women, Heinemann (2004), ISBN 978-0-325-00626-0
- excerpt from "con flama" anthologized in "Is This Forever, Or What?: Poems & Paintings From Texas", Greenwillow Books (2004), ISBN 0-06-051178-8
- "bull-jean slipn in" & "bull-jean & trouble", anthologized in Role Call: A Generational Anthology Of Social And Political Black Literature & Art, Third World Press (2001), ISBN 978-0-88378-239-2
- "dyke/warrior-Prayers" and "blood pudding", anthology in Recreations: Religion And Spirituality In The Lives Of Queer People, Q Press (1999), ISBN 978-1-895564-06-8
- the bull-jean stories, Redbone Press (1998), ISBN 978-0-86381-279-8
- Excerpt from sonnata blue, anthologized in Ma-Ka Diasporic Juks, Sister Vision Press (1998), ISBN 978-1-896705-14-9
- "that beat" anthologized in Does Your Mama Know?: An Anthology of Black Lesbian Coming Out Stories, RedBone Press (1997), ISBN 978-0-9656659-0-2

=== Albums ===
- amniotic/flow, with daughter, with Sonja Perryman (2003) available digitally
- the bull-jean stories, available digitally

=== Theater pieces ===
- delta dandi
- The love conjure/blues text installation
- con flama
- blood pudding
- dyke/warrior-Prayers
- no mo blues
- lovve/rituals & rage
