= Lambda Literary Award for Gay Romance =

Annual literary award for gay romance books

- Awarded for: Literary award
- Sponsored by: Lambda Literary Foundation
- Date: Annual
- Website: lambdaliterary.org/awards/

The Lambda Literary Award for Gay Romance is an annual literary award, presented by the Lambda Literary Foundation, to a novel, novella, or short story collection "by a single author that focus on a central love relationship between two or more characters, not including anthologies. The submission guidelines mention several sub-genres are included, "including traditional, historical, gothic, Regency, and paranormal romance".

== Recipients ==
Lambda Literary Award for Gay Romance winners and finalists
Year	Author	Title	Result	Ref.
2007	Rob Byrnes	When the Stars Come Out	Winner	
2007	Andy Zeffer	Going Down in La-La Land	Finalist	
2007	Timothy James Beck	Someone Like You	Finalist	
2007	Scott & Scott	Surf 'N Turf	Finalist	
2007	Lawrence Schimel	Two Boys in Love	Finalist	
2008	Michael Thomas Ford	Changing Tides	Winner	
2008	Robert Taylor	A Few Hints and Clews	Finalist	
2008	Robin Reardon	A Secret Edge	Finalist	
2008	Seth Rudetsky	Broadway Nights	Finalist	
2008	Frederick Smith	Right Side of the Wrong Bed	Finalist	
2009	Larry Duplechan	Got 'til it's Gone	Winner	
2009	Laura Baumbach and Josh Lanyon	Mexican Heat	Finalist	
2009	N. L. Gassert	The Protector	Finalist	
2010	Frank Anthony Polito	Drama Queers!	Winner	
2010	H. Leigh Aubrey	A Keen Edge	Finalist	
2010	Dan Stone	The Rest of Our Lives	Finalist	
2010	J. P. Bowie	Time After Time	Finalist	
2010	Erastes	Transgressions	Finalist	
2011	Erik Orrantia	Normal Miguel	Winner	
2011	Michael Thomas Ford	The Road Home	Finalist	
2011	Neil Plakcy	Three Wrong Turns in the Desert	Finalist	
2012	Jim Provenzano	Every Time I Think of You	Winner	
2012	Jay Bell	Something Like Summer	Finalist	
2012	Mel Bossa	Split	Finalist	
2012	Barry Brennessel	Tinseltown	Finalist	
2013	Jay Bell	Kamikaze Boys	Winner	
2013	J. H. Trumble	Don't Let Me Go	Finalist	
2013	Barry Brennessel	The Celestial	Finalist	
2013	Brad Boney	The Nothingness of Ben	Finalist	
2013	William Masswa	Toughskins	Finalist	
2014	TJ Klune	Into This River I Drown	Winner	
2014	L. A. Witt	Covet Thy Neighbor	Finalist	
2014	Alexis Hall	Glitterland	Finalist	
2014	Edmond Manning	King Mai	Finalist	
2014	L. A. Fields	My Dear Watson	Finalist	
2014	L. C. Chase	Pickup Men	Finalist	
2014	Madison Parker	Play Me, I'm Yours	Finalist	
2014	Lynley Wayne	Rocky's Road	Finalist	
2014	Larry Benjamin	Unbroken	Finalist	
2014	J. H. Trumble	Where You Are	Finalist	
2015	Jeff Mann	Salvation: A Novel of the Civil War	Winner	
2015	Barry Lowe	Everything's Coming Up Roses: Four Tales of M/M Romance	Finalist	
2015	Timothy Lambert and R.D. Cochrane	Foolish Hearts: New Gay Fiction	Finalist	
2015	Georgina Li	Like They Always Been Free	Finalist	
2015	Jim Provenzano	Message of Love	Finalist	
2015	Lloyd A. Meeker	The Companion	Finalist	
2015	David Reddish	The Passion of Sergius & Bacchus, A Novel of Truth	Finalist	
2016	Debbie McGowan	When Skies Have Fallen	Winner	
2016	Vanessa North	Blueberry Boys	Finalist	
2016	Ralph Josiah Bardsley	Brothers	Finalist	
2016	Alexis Hall	For Real	Finalist	
2016	L. A. Witt	General Misconduct	Finalist	
2016	Garrett Leigh	Misfits	Finalist	
2016	Jay Bell	Something Like Stories, Volume One	Finalist	
2016	Brad Boney	Yes	Finalist	
2017	Pene Henson	Into the Blue	Winner	
2017	Lisa Henry	Adulting 101	Finalist	
2017	Jamie Deacon	Caught Inside	Finalist	
2017	Jeff Mann	Country	Finalist	
2017	Marshall Thornton	Femme	Finalist	
2017	Alexis Hall	Pansies	Finalist	
2017	Richard Compson Sater	Rank	Finalist	
2017	Garrett Leigh	Rented Heart	Finalist	
2018	Laurie Loft	Love and Other Hot Beverages	Winner	
2018	L. A. Witt	At the Corner of Rock Bottom & Nowhere	Finalist	
2018	Bryan T. Clark	Come to The Oaks: The Story of Ben and Tobias	Finalist	
2018	Audra North	Midlife Crisis	Finalist	
2018	Johnny Diaz	Six Neckties	Finalist	
2018	Tom Mendicino	Stealing Home	Finalist	
2018	Adrienne Wilder	Wild	Finalist	
2018	Christine d'Abo	Working It	Finalist	
2019	S. C. Wynne	Crashing Upwards	Winner	
2019	Reesa Herberth and Michelle Moore	Detour	Finalist	
2019	Kris Jacen	Learn with Me	Finalist	
2019	Kayleigh Sky	No Luck	Finalist	
2019	Christina Lee and Riley Hart	Of Sunlight and Stardust	Finalist	
2019	Melanie Hansen	Point of Contact	Finalist	
2019	Angela McCallister	The CEO's Christmas Manny	Finalist	
2019	Jenny Holiday	Undue Influence: A Persuasion Retelling	Finalist	
2020	James Lovejoy	Joseph Chapman: My Molly Life	Winner	
2020	Chris Delyani	Best Man	Finalist	
2020	Rick R. Reed	Blue Umbrella Sky	Finalist	
2020	Marshall Thornton	Code Name: Liberty	Finalist	
2020	Jay Hogan	Digging Deep	Finalist	
2020	Bryan T. Clark	Escaping Camp Roosevelt	Finalist	
2020	Garrett Leigh	Kiss Me Again	Finalist	
2020	R. A. Thorn	My Baby Chased Away the Blues	Finalist	
2021	Felice Stevens	The Ghost and Charlie Muir	Winner	
2021	Adriana Herrera	Finding Joy	Finalist	
2021	Lance Ringel	Flower of Iowa	Finalist	
2021	Erin C. McRae and Racheline Maltese	Ink and Ice	Finalist	
2021	Cat Sebastian	Two Rogues Make a Right	Finalist	
2022	Larry Benjamin	Excellent Sons: A Love Story in Three Acts	Winner	
2022	Sander Santiago	Best of the Wrong Reasons	Finalist	
2022	John Patrick	Dublin Bay	Finalist	
2022	Lance Ringel	Floridian Nights	Finalist	
2022	Farhad J. Dadyburjor	The Other Man	Finalist	
2023	Kosoko Jackson	I'm So Not Over You	Winner	
2023	Marie Sinclair	Forever After	Finalist	
2023	A. M. Johnson	Forever, Con Amor	Finalist	
2023	Felice Stevens	Just One Night	Finalist	
2023	Fearne Hill	Two Tribes	Finalist	
2024	Cat Sebastian	We Could Be So Good	Winner	
2024	E. H. Lupton	Dionysus in Wisconsin	Finalist	
2024	M. A. Wardell	Mistletoe & Mishigas	Finalist	
2024	Jay Hogan	The Art of Husbandry	Finalist	
2024	KJ Charles	The Secret Lives of Country Gentlemen	Finalist	
2025	Benjamin S. Grossberg	The Spring Before Obergefell	Winner	
2025	Jem Wendel	It Takes Three To Tango	Finalist	
2025	Logan Sage Adams	Our Own Light	Finalist	
2025	William Leet	Outside the Wire	Finalist	
2025	Philip Ellis	We Could Be Heroes	Finalist	
2026	Timothy Janovsky	A Mannequin for Christmas	Winner	
2026	Derek Sowers	A Bridge in Glass	Finalist	
2026	Blair Fell	Disco Witches of Fire Island	Finalist	
2026	Carey Sass	Good Boy	Finalist	
2026	Erin Dunn	He's to Die For	Finalist	
