= 24th Lambda Literary Awards =

2012 Lambda Literary Awards

The 24th Lambda Literary Awards were held on June 4, 2012, to honour works of LGBT literature published in 2011.

== Special awards ==
| Category | Winner |
|---|---|
| Pioneer Award | Armistead Maupin, Kate Millett |
| Jim Duggins Outstanding Mid-Career Novelists' Prize | Brian Leung, Stacey D'Erasmo |

== Nominees and winners ==
| Category | Winner | Nominated |
|---|---|---|
| Bisexual Fiction | Barbara Browning, The Correspondence Artist | Ghalib Shiraz Dhalla, The Two Krishnas; J. M. Frey, Triptych; Katherine Scott Nelson, Have You Seen Me; Alex Sanchez, Boyfriends with Girlfriends |
| Bisexual Non-Fiction | Jan Steckel, The Horizontal Poet | Jonathan Alexander and Serena Anderlini-D'Onofrio, Bisexuality and Queer Theory: Intersections, Connections and Challenges; Susie Bright, Big Sex Little Death; Qwo-Li Driskill, Daniel Heath Justice, Deborah Miranda and Lisa Tatonetti, Sovereign Erotics: A Collection of Two-Spirit Literature; Ven Rey, Surviving Steven |
| Gay Debut Fiction | Rahul Mehta, Quarantine | Justin Chin, 98 Wounds; Michael Graves, Dirty One; Garth Greenwell, Mitko; Katherine Scott Nelson, Have You Seen Me |
| Gay Erotica | Dirk Vanden, All Together | Richard Labonté, ed., Best Gay Erotica 2012; Richard Labonté, ed., History’s Passions: Stories of Sex Before Stonewall; Steven Haas, ed., George Platt Lynes: The Male Nudes; Natty Soltesz, Backwoods |
| Gay Fiction | Colm Tóibín, The Empty Family | Chris Adrian, The Great Night; Alan Hollinghurst, The Stranger's Child; R. Zamora Linmark, Leche; Paul Russell, The Unreal Life of Sergey Nabokov |
| Gay Memoir/Biography | Glen Retief, The Jack Bank: A Memoir of a South African Childhood | William E. Jones, Halsted Plays Himself; Michael Schiavi, Celluloid Activist: The Life and Times of Vito Russo; Charles Silverstein, For the Ferryman: A Personal History; Ryan Van Meter, If You Knew Then What I Know Now |
| Gay Mystery | Richard Stevenson, Red White Black and Blue | Jess Faraday, The Affair of the Porcelain Dog; David Lennon, Blue’s Bayou; Garry Ryan, Malabarista; Marshall Thornton, Boystown |
| Gay Poetry | Tim Dlugos (David Trinidad, ed.), A Fast Life: The Collected Poems of Tim Dlugos | Paul Legault, The Other Poems; Thomas Meyer, Kintsugi; Carl Phillips, Double Shadow; David Trinidad, Dear Prudence: New and Selected Poems |
| Gay Romance | Jim Provenzano, Every Time I Think of You | Jay Bell, Something Like Summer; Mel Bossa, Split; Barry Brennessel, Tinseltown; Eden Winters, Settling the Score |
| Lesbian Debut Fiction | Laurie Weeks, Zipper Mouth | Sally Bellerose, The Girls Club; Lara Fergus, My Sister Chaos; Sarah Toshiko Hasu, Megume and the Trees; Christine Stark, Nickels: A Tale of Dissociation |
| Lesbian Erotica | Debra Hyde, Story of L | Lesley Gowan, The Collectors; Sacchi Green, A Ride to Remember & Other Erotic Tales; Sacchi Green, Lesbian Cops: Erotic Investigations |
| Lesbian Fiction | Farzana Doctor, Six Metres of Pavement | Shannon Cain, The Necessity of Certain Behaviors; Kristyn Dunnion, The Dirt Chronicles; Hillary Jordan, When She Woke; Nina Revoyr, Wingshooters |
| Lesbian Memoir/Biography | Jeanne Cordova, When We Were Outlaws: A Memoir of Love & Revolution | Catherine Friend, Sheepish: Two Women, Fifty Sheep, and Enough Wool to Save the Planet; Karleen Pendleton Jiménez, How to Get a Girl Pregnant; Jane Rule, Taking My Life; Julie Marie Wade, Small Fires: Essays |
| Lesbian Mystery | Kim Baldwin and Xenia Alexiou, Dying to Live | A. J. Quinn, Hostage Moon; Val McDermid, Trick of the Dark; Martha Miller, Retirement Plan |
| Lesbian Poetry | Leah Lakshmi Piepzna-Samarasinha, Love Cake | Julie R. Enszer, ed., Milk and Honey: A Celebration of Jewish Lesbian Poetry; Daphne Gottlieb, 15 Ways to Stay Alive; Christina Hutchins, The Stranger Dissolves; Dawn Lundy Martin, Discipline |
| Lesbian Romance | Kenna White, Taken by Surprise | Rebecca S. Buck, Ghosts of Winter; Julie Cannon, Rescue Me; Gerri Hill, Storms; Robbi McCoy, For Me and My Gal |
| LGBT Anthology | Michael Hames-García and Ernesto Javier Martínez, Gay Latino Studies: A Critical Reader | Ivan Coyote and Zena Sharman, Persistence: All Ways Butch and Femme; Qwo-Li Driskill, Daniel Heath Justice, Deborah Miranda and Lisa Tatonetti, Sovereign Erotics: A Collection of Two-Spirit Literature; Lazaro Lima and Felice Picano, Ambientes: New Queer Latino Writing; Mark Thompson, The Fire in Moonlight: Stories from the Radical Faeries |
| LGBT Children's/Young Adult | Bil Wright, Putting Makeup on the Fat Boy | Cris Beam, I Am J; Malinda Lo, Huntress; Patrick Ryan, Gemini Bites; Lili Wilkinson, PINK |
| LGBT Drama | Peggy Shaw, A Menopausal Gentleman: The Solo Performances of Peggy Shaw | Anton Dudley, Letters to the End of the World; Madeleine George, The Zero Hour; Jon Marans, The Temperamentals; Jonathan Tolins, Secrets of the Trade |
| LGBT Non-Fiction | Michael Bronski, A Queer History of the United States | Wanda M. Corn and Tirza True Latimer, Seeing Gertrude Stein: Five Stories; Robert Duncan, The H.D. Book; Jay Michaelson, God vs. Gay?: The Religious Case for Equality; Scott Pasfield, Gay in America: Portraits by Scott Pasfield |
| LGBT Science Fiction/Fantasy/Horror | Lee Thomas, The German | J. M. Frey, Triptych; Geoff Ryman, Paradise Tales: and Other Stories; JoSelle Vanderhooft, Steam-powered: Lesbian Steampunk Stories; L. A. Witt, Static |
| LGBT Studies | Lisa L. Moore, Sister Arts: The Erotics of Lesbian Landscapes | Jafari S. Allen, ¡Venceremos?: The Erotics of Black Self-making in Cuba; Chandan Reddy, Freedom with Violence: Race, Sexuality, and the US State; Eric A. Stanley and Nat Smith, Captive Genders: Trans Embodiment and the Prison Industrial Complex; Margot Weiss, Techniques of Pleasure: BDSM and the Circuits of Sexuality |
| Transgender Fiction | Tristan Taormino, ed., Take Me There: Trans and Genderqueer Erotica | Cris Beam, I Am J; Dana De Young, The Butterfly and the Flame; Rafe Posey, The Book of Broken Hymns; L. A. Witt, Static |
| Transgender Non-Fiction | Justin Vivian Bond, Tango: My Childhood Backwards and in High Heels | Peter Boag, Re-Dressing America’s Frontier Past; Megan Rohrer and Zander Keig, eds., Letters For My Brothers: Transitional Wisdom in Retrospect; Dean Spade, Normal Life: Administrative Violence, Critical Trans Politics and the Limits of Law; Eric A. Stanley and Nat Smith, Captive Genders: Trans Embodiment and the Prison Industrial Complex |
