= Something Like Summer =

Something Like Summer may refer to:

- Something Like Summer (novel), a 2011 novel by Jay Bell
- Something Like Summer (film), a 2017 film, based on the novel
