= List of Power Rangers Dino Charge characters =

Power Rangers Dino Charge and its second season Power Rangers Dino Super Charge, is an American children's television series that airs on Nickelodeon. It is the 2015 and 2016 entry in the Power Rangers franchise. The show follows the Power Rangers Tyler Navarro (Brennan Mejia), Shelby Watkins (Camille Hyde), Koda the caveman (Yoshi Sudarso), Riley Griffin (Michael Taber), and Chase Randall (James Davies), who protect the Earth from the evil alien bounty hunter, Sledge, who seeks the Energems to become invincible. Later, The Power Rangers are joined by the medieval knight, Sir Ivan of Zandar (Davi Santos), his modern liege Prince Phillip III (Jarred Blakiston), and their own tech expert Kendall Morgan (Claire Blackwelder). In the second season, Tyler's long-lost father, James (Reuben Turner, Dan Musgrove), and Keeper's apprentice Zenowing, who also become Power Rangers to stop Sledge, only to find his former prisoner Heckyl (Ryan Carter) has transformed into the more powerful evil alien Snide, and he now wants to finish what Sledge has started and take over the Earth.

== Main characters ==
=== Dino Charge Power Rangers ===
Based at the Amber Beach Dinosaur Museum in the city of Amber Beach, the Dino Charge Rangers' arsenal revolves around being powered by the Energems, ten items of great power. As the spirits of dinosaurs that Keeper initially entrusted the Energems to have bonded into them, they manifest as Zords that the Dino Charge Rangers use to fight enlarged monsters. Initially having five Energems, the Power Rangers' mission is to find the remaining five before their enemies do.

In battle, the Rangers wield the Dino Charge Morpher, which doubles as a gun, and the Dino Saber, which can combine with the Dino Charge Morpher to form the Dino Blade Blaster. They also wield a series of battery-like Dino Chargers to gain additional powers.

==== Tyler Navarro ====
Tyler Navarro is the enthusiastic, outgoing, gregarious, and adventurous leader of the Dino Charge Power Rangers who works as a chef at the Amber Beach Dinosaur Museum's restaurant, the Dino Bite Cafe. He also works to find his missing father, who mysteriously disappeared ten years prior to the series while at an archaeological dig site and left behind a journal containing a sketch of a monster. His search leads him to a cave where he finds the Red Energem in a Tyrannosaurus fossil and becomes the Red Dino Charge Ranger.

As the Red Dino Charge Ranger, Tyler wields the T-Rex Smasher gauntlet. Using the power of the T-Rex Super Charger and the T-Rex Super Charge Morpher, Tyler can assume T-Rex Super Charge Mode and channel the Dino Charge Megazord's powers.

Tyler Navarro is portrayed by Brennan Mejia. Mejia was a fan of Power Rangers going in to the show, particularly Power Rangers Time Force. He, and other members of the cast, were all surprised by the producers when they did a cold read of the script and were instructed to open up treasure chests as part of the reading, inside of which contained their official new role. He previously auditioned for Power Rangers Samurai and also tried out for the Blue and Green Ranger roles in Dino Charge as part of the audition process. Before working on Power Rangers, he worked as an acrobat at the San Diego Zoo. Mejia spoke in interviews of how he and the other cast members trained with Japanese stunt actors from the Super Sentai series to prepare for action scenes. He also joked of how he and the other cast members became accustomed to wearing their signature colors offset. He returns in Power Rangers Beast Morphers.

==== Shelby Watkins ====
Shelby Watkins works as a waitress at the Amber Beach Dinosaur Museum's restaurant, the Dino Bite Cafe inside. Though she comes off as clumsy and ditzy due to disliking her position, she is a stubborn and noble tomboy with a vast knowledge of dinosaurs, with her favorite being the Triceratops. After stowing away in one of the museum's trucks bound for a dig site, she finds and bonds with the Pink Energem and becomes the Pink Dino Charge Ranger. She also develops a crush on Tyler, who reciprocates her feelings by the end of the series. She initially butts heads with her boss and mentor, Dr. Kendal Morgan, early in the series. However, as the team bonds, the two learn to work together, and Shelby is able to impress Dr. Morgan by applying her dinosaur knowledge to the fight against Sledge, such as building a device to locate the Energems and creating the Spino Zord.

As the Pink Dino Charge Ranger, Shelby wields the Tricera Drill.

Shelby Watkins is portrayed by Camille Hyde. Hyde is the first African-American woman to portray a Pink Power Ranger, but did not discover this until well into the season. Hyde felt that her part in Dino Charge would become a part of the long legacy of Power Rangers by continuing with the dinosaur theme. She also remarked that being able to stay on her feet was one of the hardest parts of the physical training as part of the role and was just as surprised as her castmates when she was given the role at what they thought was their final audition. Prior to the show, Hyde was a student at Chapman University, majoring in policy and environmental science. She left her studies early in order to go to an audition. In an interview, she mentioned the camaraderie she felt from the actresses who portrayed the Yellow and Pink Rangers in Power Rangers Megaforce, who wrote to her to ask if she was feeling alright when she began filming in New Zealand for the first time. She also spoke of how the young fans have treated her when they realize who she is, bringing up a time she was recognized by two little boys in a pizzeria in her hometown of Washington, D.C. While filming in New Zealand, Hyde received martial arts training and continued to pursue her academics through online courses. Hyde attributed her success to her determination to stay focused and to acting courses she took at Chapman University. Hyde considered herself a tomboy growing up and never wore pink, but now that she had been filming as Shelby for a year, she began to wear more pink outside of the role.

==== Koda ====
Koda is a virtuous caveman who found the Blue Energem a hundred thousand years prior to the series in a Stegosaurus fossil. After saving his little brother, Taku, from a smilodon, he fell off a cliff and ended up frozen in a glacier, though the Energem's powers kept him alive. By the present, Koda is found and unfrozen by Chase and Dr. Morgan, and slowly adapts to modern customs and technology, speaking in broken, minimalist sentences. Along the way, he became a digger for the Amber Beach Museum's archaeological digs, a dishwasher for the Dino Bite Cafe, and the Blue Dino Charge Ranger.

In battle, Koda can make use of his extraordinary strength and sharp reflexes and senses. As the Blue Dino Charge Ranger, he wields the Stego Shield.

Koda is portrayed by Yoshi Sudarso. Sudarso has been a fan of Power Rangers since a child and also enjoyed Time Force. On auditioning for the role, he said that he had known it was a caveman and had used a particular speech pattern when auditioning, but he was thrown off by the cold read on the day that he was given the role. Sudarso is also a fan of the Japanese television series Zyuden Sentai Kyoryuger, on which Dino Charge was based. He hooked Brennan Mejia on the show as well, leading the two of them and fellow cast member James Davies to leave their own ad-libbed references to the show that made it into the final cut. He returns in Power Rangers Ninja Steel and Power Rangers Beast Morphers.

==== Chase Randall ====
Chase Randall is a laid-back and flirtatious young man from New Zealand who works at the Amber Beach Museum as a janitor and expert digger. Prior to meeting the other Rangers, he received the Black Energem as a reward from the Māori fortune-teller Moana after he saved her cat, which allows him to transform into the Black Dino Charge Ranger. He also serves as second-in-command of the team, usually taking charge in Tyler's absence.

As the Dino Charge Black Ranger, Chase is skilled at firearm-based combat and wields the Para Chopper beam gun.

Chase Randall is portrayed by James Davies. When interviewed about the audition process, Davies said that the last fake-out audition was the worst for him because he was so nervous about the cold reading. During filming, he enjoyed learning how to do tricks with the blaster prop. He returns in Power Rangers Beast Morphers.

==== Riley Griffin ====
Riley Griffin is the cool-headed, sensible, intellectual, and youngest member of the Dino Charge Rangers. He originally lived on a farm, where he found the Green Energem in a Velociraptor fossil while fighting Fury to protect his dog, Rubik, and became the Green Dino Charge Ranger. Following this, he moves to Amber Beach and becomes a summer intern at the Amber Beach Dinosaur Museum and a waiter at the Dino Bite Cafe.

In battle, Riley is an expert swordsman who specialises in a backhanded grip-based fighting style. As the Green Dino Charge Ranger, he also wields the Raptor Claw.

Riley Griffin is portrayed by Michael Taber. In an interview, Taber brought up how the production team tricked them all at the final cold read audition, and how they had not heard from the producers in over a month when they were all finally called in again. When asked about his favorite episode, he said it was one that had not yet aired when the interview was held at the 2015 San Diego Comic Con, but aside from that one it was when his character became a Power Ranger in the second episode. Taber reprised his role in Power Rangers Beast Morphers, albeit uncredited and as a voice only. In 2020, Taber stated that he intentionally portrayed Riley as gay and with a crush on fellow ranger Chase.

==== Kendall Morgan ====
Kendall Morgan is a confident, direct, and blunt scientist who manages the Amber Beach Dinosaur Museum and serves as the head of its paleontology digging group and technical advisor to the Rangers. Prior to the series, she met Keeper while digging for fossils and promised to help him find the Energems. Using her position, she established an underground research lab that would go on to serve as the Rangers' headquarters and builds several gadgets and weapons for the future Rangers. After Sledge's forces steal the Purple Energem and kidnap Keeper, Kendall infiltrates the bounty hunter's ship to rescue Keeper, bonding with the Purple Energem and becoming the Purple Dino Charge Ranger in the process.

Kendall Morgan is portrayed by Claire Blackwelder.

==== Sir Ivan of Zandar ====
Sir Ivan of Zandar is a kind, brave, honest, loyal, and humble medieval knight who served the royal family of the fictional small country of Zandar 800 years prior to the series. While escorting the young Prince Colin, Sir Ivan found the Gold Energem, but was attacked by Fury, who absorbed him and kept him prisoner. In the present, Fury uses the trapped Sir Ivan and Gold Energem to control the Ptera Zord against the Rangers until the knight escapes from Fury and becomes the Gold Dino Charge Ranger. He initially chooses not to join the Rangers after considering them an unworthy team while they were under a monster's effect. However, he eventually joins them after they save him.

As the Gold Dino Charge Ranger, he uses the Gold Ptera Morpher bracer to transform and wields the Gold Ptera Saber.

Sir Ivan is portrayed by Davi Santos. In interviews, Mejia and Hyde spoke about how difficult it was to keep Santos' appearance in the show secret until after his character's debut. They and the other cast members would regularly take photos to post on Power Rangers' social media and would have to keep him out of the shot, and then they would take another photo with him in the group. He returns in Power Rangers Beast Morphers.

== Recurring characters ==
=== Keeper ===
Keeper is a dinosaur-like alien who brought the Energems to Earth 65 million years ago while trying to escape Sledge. He directed a Tyrannosaurus to gather several dinosaurs and other ancient creatures to bond with the Energems to keep them safe and tricked Fury into taking a bomb to Sledge instead. However, it caused Sledge's ship to release several asteroids, which led to the extinction of the dinosaurs and Keeper's death Despite this, he is found by Kendall, whom he instructs to help him gather the Energems to prepare for Sledge's return and provides counsel to the Rangers.

Keeper's voiced by Richard Simpson while Eve Gordon serves as the suit actor. He returns in Power Rangers Beast Morphers.

=== Sledge ===
Sledge is an intergalactic bounty hunter who prides himself on capturing monsters and collecting their bounties offered by Lord Arcanon. He is ill-tempered towards his subordinates, but displays a soft side around his fiancé, Poisandra. 65 million years ago, he chased Keeper across the galaxy to claim the Energems' power for himself, but was tricked into taking a bomb aboard his ship, which caused the extinction of the dinosaurs and blasted Sledge's ship into deep space. By the present, Sledge returns and sends his captured outlaws to retrieve the Energems for him. After several failed attempts, he manages to obtain the Purple Energem and kidnaps Keeper. However, the Rangers mount a rescue mission, take back the Energem, and cause Sledge's ship to crash on Earth. Following the crash, Sledge discovers a clutch of Greenzilla eggs and leaves to plant around them around the world. To facilitate this, he fakes his death and manipulates Heckyl and Snide into distracting the Rangers for him. After returning and using the Dark Energem to obliterate Arcanon and his forces, Sledge abandons Snide and enacts his plan to use the Greenzillas help him tow the Earth to the planet Kamen 5, only for his ship and the Earth to be pulled into a black hole following the Dark Energem's destruction. While traveling back in time to save the Earth from the black hole, the Rangers encounter a past version of Sledge before sending his ship and everyone aboard flying into the sun, killing them.

Sledge is voiced by Adam Gardiner.

==== Wrench ====
Wrench is Sledge's bumbling yet nasty and petty wind-up toy-themed ship technician who wields a battle axe in battle. He is responsible for creating Curio for Poisandra and the Reanimator to bring destroyed monsters back to life. After officiating Sledge and Poisandra's wedding amidst his plot to tow the Earth to Kamen 5, Wrench and everyone aboard Sledge's ship are pulled into a black hole. While traveling back in time to save the Earth from the black hole, the Rangers briefly encounter a past version of Wrench and kill him.

Wrench is voiced by Estevez Gillespie.

==== Fury ====
Fury is Sledge's ill-tempered lion/Oni-themed second-in-command who wields a lightning-empowered Seven-Branched Sword in battle. After accidentally bringing a bomb aboard Sledge's ship and being stranded on Earth for 65 million years, Fury attempts to pursue revenge against Keeper and find the Energems over the course of the intervening years, encountering Sir Ivan and James along the way. Having captured the former as of the present, Fury rejoins Sledge and continues his attempts to steal the Energems for him, despite losing control of Sir Ivan after the Rangers free him.

Amidst Sledge's plot to tow the Earth to Kamen 5, Fury and everyone aboard Sledge's ship are pulled into a black hole. While traveling back in time to save the Earth from the black hole, the Rangers briefly encounter a past version of Fury before using the bomb that previously damaged Sledge's ship to kill Fury.

Fury is voiced by Paul Harrop.

==== Poisandra ====
Poisandra is the vain, air-headed, heart-themed fiancé of Sledge who only cares about marrying him, with his goal to claim the Energems upsetting her greatly. She threatens to leave him if he does not give up his quest, but he eventually marries her while enacting his plot to tow the Earth to Kamen 5, only to be pulled into a black hole along with everyone aboard Sledge's ship and the Earth. While traveling back in time to save the Earth from the Black Hole, the Rangers briefly encounter a past version of Poisandra and kill her.

Poisandra is voiced by Jackie Clarke.

==== Curio ====
Curio is a rag doll/scarecrow-themed companion that Wrench creates for Poisandra as an early wedding present from Sledge. While he is constantly by her side, Curio also acts on his own as one of Sledge's subordinates.

Curio is voiced by Estevez Gillespie.

==== Vivix ====
The Vivix are Sledge's paramecium-themed foot soldiers who can merge with each other to form large monsters called Vivizords to fight the Rangers' Zords.

==== Spikeballs ====
The Spikeballs are Sledge's Trilobite/Anomalocaris/Opabinia/Pterygotus-themed elite foot soldiers and prison guards who wield batons.

The Spikeballs are voiced by Campbell Cooley.

=== Prince Phillip III of Zandar ===
Prince Phillip III of Zandar is the modern day prince of Zandar. He comes into contact with the Rangers when he learns they established an exhibit that included Zandarian property. After being attacked by Fury, learning the importance of friendship and courage, and seeing the Rangers morph, Prince Phillip becomes inspired to find an Energem and become a Power Ranger. Using his wealth, he discovers the Graphite Energem, but initially fails to bond with it despite learning martial arts and donating to charity. After saving Chase's sister, Chloe, from Sledge's forces, he successfully bonds with the energem, becoming the Graphite Dino Charge Ranger.

As the Graphite Dino Charge Ranger, he can perform the Royal Dino Punch attack, which allows him to summon an energy flail to increase his punching capability.

Phillip is portrayed by Jarred Blakiston.

=== Heckyl and Snide ===
Heckyl is a humanoid alien with the ability to fire energy blasts from his hands from the planet Sentai 6, where he was transformed into the monstrous ammonite-themed Snide upon touching the Dark Energem while he was protecting it from Lord Arcanon. Following his transformation, the latter suppressed Heckyl's memories.

Sometime later, Heckyl and Snide became one of Sledge's prisoners and locked in solitary confinement. Sledge releases Heckyl to help him obtain the Purple Energem in exchange for the latter becoming Sledge's partner. However, Fury steals the Energem first, leading to Heckyl being betrayed and thrown back in his cell. Following Sledge's apparent death, Heckyl and Snide assert their authority and lead the former's forces in an attempt to take over the Earth. Heckyl also enacts a separate plan to obtain the Energems by befriending the Rangers and infiltrating their ranks, only for them to discover his true intentions and connection to Snide due to his inability to control when his transformations occur.

After Lord Arcanon arrives on Earth, Heckyl is re-incarcerated, but has Poisandra free him in exchange for telling her Sledge's true fate. Upon escaping and seeing Arcanon with the Dark Energem, Heckyl's memories return and he attacks the former, only to be restrained by Singe. However, Snide manifests and offers to join Arcanon, in exchange for being separated from Heckyl. Once Wrench accomplishes this, Heckyl escapes while Snide continues to assist Arcanon until Sledge returns and defects to him.

Amidst Sledge's plot to tow the Earth to Kamen 5, Snide discovers Sledge also plans to eliminate him. To maintain his standing with Sledge, Snide traces a destroyed Greenzilla egg in Amber Beach to the Rangers' headquarters and destroys it despite Kendall's best efforts to stop him. However, Heckyl arrives and fights him before helping the Rangers kill him and the Dark Energem after Sledge refuses to use the Magnabeam on Snide. After helping the Rangers stop a past version of Sledge, Heckyl becomes a keeper and charged by Zenowing with protecting a past version of the Dark Energem.

Heckyl is portrayed by Ryan Carter and Snide is voiced by Campbell Cooley.

=== James Navarro ===
James Navarro is Tyler's long-lost father who became bonded to the Aqua Energem in a Ankylosaurus fossil while saving his friend Rusty during a cave-in, which turned him into the Aqua Dino Charge Ranger and stopped his body's ageing process. After the Energem attracted Fury, James was forced to go into hiding for ten years to protect his family and was presumed dead. In the present, James returns to protect his son from Ninja before helping him break the corrupted T-Rex Supercharger's influence. Following this, James leaves to find the Silver Energem and Titano Zord before Sledge's forces do.

James Navarro is portrayed by Reuben Turner and voiced by Dan Musgrove.

=== Lord Arcanon ===
Lord Arcanon is a power-hungry, ruthless, calculating, multi-faced Statue of Liberty-themed intergalactic warlord who hired Sledge to capture outlaws for him in order to build an army to help him rule the universe. Millions of years ago, he went off to search for the Energems on the planet Sentai 6 before destroying it in the process. Along the way, he forced Zenowing and Heckyl to hold the Dark Energem, resulting in Doomwing and Snide's creations respectively. In the present, Arcanon tasks Singe with infiltrating Heckyl and Snide's ranks and report back on their activities before eventually coming to Earth himself to claim Sledge's bounties, re-imprison Heckyl and Snide, and assume control of their forces. Utilizing the Dark Energem to strengthen himself, Arcanon nearly overpowers the Rangers before they manage to weaken him. While attempting to recover, Sledge takes the Dark Energem from Arcanon and uses it to obliterate him and his allies.

Lord Arcanon is voiced by Andy Grainger.

==== Singe ====
Singe is an arrogant pyrokinetic candle/monkey-themed monster who wields a gun that doubles as the hilt of his sword. He arrives on Earth ostensibly to join Heckyl and Snide while secretly reporting back on their activities to Lord Arcanon, developing a rivalry with a distrustful Fury in the process. After Heckyl becomes suspicious of his true intentions, Singe temporarily leaves Earth to get Arcanon's help. Sometime later, Singe returns with Arcanon and assists him in his plans to obtain the Energems before they are obliterated by Sledge.

Singe is voiced by Mark Mitchinson.

==== Doomwing ====
Doomwing is a cocky and manipulative Archaeopteryx-themed alien, servant of Lord Arcanon, and the evil half of Zenowing created from the Dark Energem. Using his connection to Zenowing, Doomwing uses the Silver Energem to disguise himself as the Silver Ranger and manipulate the other Rangers into giving him information on their technology. However, the Rangers eventually discover the truth and build split emitters to separate Doomwing from Zenowing. Due to losing the Silver Energem in the process, Doomwing attempts to prove his worth to Arcanon by re-merging with Zenowing and having Wrench revive an army of monsters to destroy the Rangers, only to be destroyed by Zenowing.

Doomwing is voiced by Mark Wright.

=== Zenowing ===
Zenowing is an Archaeopteryx-esque alien and Keeper's apprentice. After finding the Silver Energem, Lord Arcanon forced Zenowing to hold the Dark Energem, which caused him to develop an evil personality called Doomwing, who is loyal to Arcanon. Arriving on Earth, Zenowing encounters the Rangers and gains enough control to warn them of Doomwing. The Rangers build and use a split emitter to separate Zenowing from his evil side, allowing him to return to Keeper and warn him of the Dark Energem.

Unlike the other Rangers, Zenowing utilizes a variant of the Dino Charge Morpher called the Titano Charge Morpher and the Titano Saber.

== Guest characters ==
- Outlaws: Monsters that Sledge has captured from across the universe for Lord Arcanon. Sledge and his subordinates offer the monsters freedom to fight the Power Rangers and get the Energems. To make a monster grow, Sledge has his Magnabeam fired on them. When Heckyl and Snide, and later Lord Arcanon, take control of Sledge's ship and the surviving monsters, they fire the Magnabeam up to a satellite and redirect it at the monster.
  - Iceage (voiced by Gerald Urquhart) An impact winter/smilodon-themed monster with powerful ice-based attacks. After a failed attempt to take the Pink Energem results in the T-Rex Zord sending him flying, Iceage attacks the city with Vivix and Vivizords, only to be destroyed by Tyler. Sometime later, Iceage is revived to assist Stingrage and Meteor steal the Purple Energem, but gets re-imprisoned following Meteor's destruction. Following Sledge's apparent death and Snide assuming leadership, Iceage attempts to freeze the Rangers alive to steal their Energems, only to be destroyed by the Plesio Charge Megazord.
  - Scrapper (voiced by Jeff Szusterman) – A car crusher-themed monster who can tuck his body into his right arm for swift mobility and shoot lasers from his mouth. After Sledge catches him trying to escape, the former offers him freedom in exchange for assisting Sledge in obtaining the Energems, only for Scrapper to be destroyed by the Dino Charge Megazord Tri-Stego Formation.
  - Slammer (voiced by Nic Sampson) – A prison-themed monster who can trap anyone in his laser cages. He is sent by Fury to find the Energems, only to be destroyed by the Dino Charge Megazord Stego-Raptor Formation.
  - Spellbinder (voiced by Callum Stembridge) – A crow/bank vault-themed monster who can shoot feather-like arrows and wears a cape capable of blocking all attacks. He is sent by Sledge to obtain a magic pendant that enables the user to control people's minds, only to be destroyed by the Dino Charge Megazord Para-Raptor Formation while Sledge and Wrench obtain Spellbinder's pendant.
  - Cavity (voiced by Kelson Henderson) – A pastry chef-themed monster with a whisk for a right hand, a gun shaped like a pastry bag for a left hand, and the ability to cause painful toothaches. He is freed by Poisandra to bake her wedding cake, but Sledge uses Cavity against the Rangers, only for the monster to be destroyed by the Dino Charge Megazord Tri-Stego Formation.
  - Stingrage (voiced by Peter Daube) – A virus/devil-themed monster who can cause people to go berserk with his stinger-firing staff. Poisandra commands him to attack the Rangers, only to be destroyed by the Dino Charge Megazord Tri-Ankylo Formation. Stingrage is later revived to assist Iceage and Meteor steal the Purple Energem, only to be re-imprisoned following Meteor's destruction. Following an off-screen death, Stingrage is revived once more to give the Rangers amnesia and help Snide locate the Rangers' base. While Snide succeeds, Stingrage is destroyed by the Dino Charge Megazord Para-Raptor Formation while his venom inadvertently contributes to Snide forgetting where the Rangers' base is.
  - Duplicon (voiced by Paolo Rotonda) – A branding iron/Taiyaki mold-themed monster who can turn people into clones of others. He is released by Poisandra to help her steal the Rangers' E-Tracer, find the Energems, and gain control of the Ptera Zord. However, Duplicon is destroyed by the Dino Charge Megazord Tri-Ankylo Formation. After Wrench revives him, Duplicon assists Memorella in her plot to infiltrate the Rangers' headquarters, but abandons her to go trick-or-treating with Curio. After Memorella is destroyed, Duplicon is re-imprisoned by Sledge.
  - Puzzler (voiced by Phil Brown) – A maze-themed monster who can defeat almost anyone at any game. He is sent to challenge Riley to a game of chance, but the latter's superior logic leads to Puzzler's defeat and destruction by the Dino Charge Megazord Para-Raptor Formation and Ptera Zord.
  - Bones (voiced by Robert Mignault) – A bone-themed monster who can steal a person's bravery by stealing a part of their backbone and trap people with bone clamps. Poisandra commands him to attack the Rangers and make them cowards. However, Shelby and Sir Ivan foil his plot and Bones is destroyed by the Ptera Charge Megazord and Dino Charge Megazord Tri-Stego Formation.
  - Smokescreen (voiced by Brendan Lovell) – A Children's Day-themed monster with the ability to produce a red smog, fly, and fuse his legs into a fish-like tail. Sledge frees him to help Wrench plant a bomb, but the Rangers foil the plot while Tyler and Sir Ivan defeat him before Smokescreen is destroyed by the Dino Charge Megazord Tri-Stego-Ptera Formation.
  - Gold Digger (voiced by Scott Wills) – A treasure-themed monster who wields exploding gold coins, a pickaxe, and stone slabs. He is sent with Wrench to lure the Rangers into a trap and succeeds in trapping Sir Ivan, Tyler, and Shelby underground. However, Chase manages to free them before the Rangers defeat Gold Digger and destroy him with the Dino Charge Megazord Tri-Stego-Ptera Formation.
  - Memorella (voiced by Lori Dungey) – A vampire-themed monster with telepathy and the ability to turn into a bat. She is sent by Sledge and Curio with Duplicon to infiltrate the Rangers' headquarters and steal the Energems, only to be destroyed by the Ptera Charge Megazord Pachy Formation.
  - Shearfear (voiced by Sean Lynch) – A cutlery-themed monster with blades all over his body, Swiss Army knife-shaped arms, and special scissors capable of severing the bonds of friendship. After catching him using his abilities on Poisandra and Curio, Sledge tasks Shearfear with doing the same to the Rangers. However, Riley and Koda destroy the monster's scissors before the Rangers destroy him with the Ptera Charge Megazord Para-Raptor Formation.
  - Meteor (voiced by Stephen Butterworth) – A meteoroid/Chicxulub crater-themed monster capable of attacking with his namesakes. He is sent by Sledge with a revived Iceage and Stingrage to obtain the Purple Energem, only to be destroyed by the Dino Charge Megazord Ankylo-Pachy Formation. Wrench later revives Meteor to destroy the Plesio Zord, only for the monster to be destroyed by the Plesio Charge Megazord.
  - Wish Star (voiced by Ross Girven) – A Tanabata-themed monster capable of granting people's wishes, albeit with something going wrong. He is sent with Fury to get the Purple Energem, but Wish Star uses one of his wishes to escape and attack the Rangers on his own. However, they trick him into depleting his wishes before destroying him with the Dino Charge Megazord Ankylo-Pachy Formation.
  - Greenzilla – A giant, feral, and powerful dinosaur/plant/caterpillar-themed monster with incredible strength and tendrils who is reputed to be one of the worst monsters in Sledge's possession. While it is destroyed by the Plesio Charge Megazord Pachy-Rex Formation, Sledge finds six Greenzilla eggs and places them around the world, though the Rangers destroy the Greenzillas with all of their Megazords.
  - Nightmare (voiced by Jacque Drew) – A sheep-themed monster with dream-manipulating abilities and pillows capable of immediately putting people to sleep. Snide tasks him with using his pillows to put the Rangers to sleep and use their dreams to make them attack each other. However, Nightmare is destroyed by the Dino Charge Megazord Stego-Raptor Formation. Sometime later, he is revived to assist Game Face and Professor Strickler in a plot to switch the Rangers' bodies, only to be destroyed by the Dino Charge Ultrazord.
  - Ninja (voiced by Adrian Smith) – A sword-wielding namesake/squid-themed monster who possesses super-speed, wields throwing stars, and can perform shadow ninja attacks. Singe dispatches him to plant a computer virus in the Dino Charge Rangers' weapons before accompanying Hunter to track down Tyler after he uses a corrupted Dino Charger that caused him to behave like a Tyrannosaurus. However, Ninja is destroyed by the Plesio Charge Megazord Pachy-Rex Formation.
  - Hunter (voiced by Jay Simon) – A crossbow-wielding blue-ringed octopus/cheetah/namesake-themed monster who is sent by Singe to help Ninja hunt Tyler after he is affected by a corrupted Dino Charger that caused him to behave like a Tyrannosaurus. After Ninja is destroyed, Heckyl almost destroys Hunter for failing to get the Energems, but Singe stops him to use Hunter as bait for a plot to use Zotac Rings to weaken the Energems. However, Hunter is destroyed by Chase, Koda, Riley, Shelby, and Sir Ivan.
  - Game Face (voiced by Michael Saccente) – A sports equipment-themed monster who wields an explosive bat. He is initially summoned by Fury to fight the Rangers. Despite losing to them, Game Face convinces Heckyl not to destroy him by claiming he lost because the Vivix are out of shape. Allowing him to train them into better fighters, Heckyl gives Game Face another chance. The latter's Vivix nearly overpower the Rangers, but they manage to defeat them and Game Face before destroying them with the Plesio Charge Megazord Pachy-Rex Formation. Sometime later, Game Face is revived to assist Professor Strickler and Nightmare in a plot to switch the Rangers' bodies, only to be destroyed by the Dino Charge Ultrazord.
  - Spell Digger (voiced by Scott Wills) – A hybrid monster with the head, mind, and pickaxe of Gold Digger and the body of Spellbinder that Fury and Wrench created from Spellbinder's pendant and Gold Digger's coins to assist Heckyl in a plot to induce greed in anyone touches his coins and create a portal to pull the Rangers into. However, he is destroyed by the Plesio Charge Megazord Pachy-Rex Formation.
  - Half-Bake (voiced by Kevin Keys) – An Autumn-themed monster who wields a mortar and pestle. He serves as Heckyl's chef, but his cookies fail to make an impression. After failing to convince Heckyl to let him fight the Rangers, Half-Bake sneaks out and fights them anyway, only to be destroyed by the Ptera Charge Megazord Para Formation.
  - Hookbeard (voiced by Mark Wright) – A fishing tackle/marlin-themed monster with a pirate-esque personality who wields an electric fishing rod and a laser-shooting harpoon. He is sent by Snide to accompany Fury and Wrench in finding and destroying the Titano Zord, only to be destroyed by the Titano Charge Megazord.
  - Scumlaw (voiced by Jason Hood) – A prosecutor/tap-themed monster who is sent by Poisandra and Curio to trap the Rangers in the Halloween Intergalactic Court and put them on trial in a kangaroo court, only to be destroyed by the Rangers.
  - Leisure (voiced by Penny Ashton) – A summer-themed monster and twin sister of Loafer with a crab-like right arm who can manipulate sunlight into her Vacation Beam, which can make humans lazy, as well as shoot lasers from her ice cream cone-shaped hand. She was sealed away by Koda's grandfather in prehistoric times, but is accidentally freed by Sir Ivan in the present. Following this, Leisure travels to the sun to use her Vacation Beam on Earth's inhabitants. However, the unaffected Koda and Kendall use the Plesio Charge Megazord to destroy the monster and undo her effects.
  - Loafer (voiced by Aaron Ward) – A summer-themed monster and twin brother of Leisure with similar abilities as his sister and the ability to throw explosive beach balls. Having been captured by Sledge sometime prior to the series, he is initially mistaken for Leisure before Heckyl orders him to accompany Fury in destroying the Rangers, making use of their immunity to Leisure's Vacation Beam. However, Loafer is destroyed by Tyler.
  - Professor Strickler (voiced by Emmett Skilton) – A classroom-themed monster with a pencil-like Gatling gun for a left arm, wields a pointer-like rapier, and the Switch Eraser, which is capable of switching any two persons' bodies. Snide orders Strickler to use his Switch Eraser on the Rangers, with a revived Nightmare and Game Face providing support. Despite this however, Strickler is destroyed by the Dino Charge Ultrazord.
  - Badussa (voiced by Ross Girven) – A dog/knight-themed monster who wields a demonic sword and a pendant that can turn anyone to stone. Sledge and Fury send Badussa to stop the Rangers from finding their ship. The monster succeeds in turning most of the Rangers to stone, but Shelby, James, and Prince Phillip join forces with Keeper and Heckyl to destroy Badussa's amulet before all of the Rangers destroy Badussa himself.
  - Heximas (voiced by Andrew Laing) – A Christmas-themed monster who escaped from Sledge's ship before it was thrown into the sun. After spending the next 65 million years growing his own Vivix, he steals coal from Santa Claus, applies them with a special formula capable of turning anyone who touches them into enthralled evil elves, and gives them out as part of his plot to make toys for naughty children. However, the Rangers foil his plot and destroy him with the Dino Charge Ultrazord after he enlarges on his own.
- G-BO: A robot created by Prince Phillip to help him train to become a Power Ranger. Fury captures it and has Wrench reprogram it to fight the Rangers, but it is defeated by Prince Phillip.
- Albert Smith: A kind-hearted and energetic explorer and Bigfoot hunter from Auckland, New Zealand who runs a tourist spot in the woods. A year prior to the series, he found the Purple Energem while rescuing a little girl and became the Purple Dino Charge Ranger. Using his powers, he performed simple good deeds around Auckland until Sledge's monsters attack him. Despite receiving help from the other Rangers to fend them off, Albert breaks his bond with the Purple Energem with Keeper's help due to his lack of combat prowess and unwillingness to leave New Zealand. Albert is portrayed by Arthur Ranford.
- Beauticruel (voiced by Marissa Stott) – A drag queen-themed monster created by Poisandra from a female Vivix via magic makeup who wields a magic paintbrush that allows her to weaken victims and transfer their power to others, switch bodies, and make others fall in love with her. Heckyl uses Beauticruel in a plot to make the Rangers fall in love with her and willingly give their Energems to her. Despite being accompanied by Poisandra and Wrench, Beauticruel is destroyed by the Ptera Charge Megazord Tricera Formation.
- Fortress – An artificial cemetery-themed monster created by Wrench to memorize the Rangers' Megazords' moves and counter them. With Heckyl and Snide piloting it, Fortress overpowers Lord Arcanon, Doomwing, and Singe after they steal the Rangers' Zords. When the Rangers arrive and regain control of their Zords, they form the Dino Charge Ultrazord and destroy Fortress.
- Conductro and Screech (voiced by Kevin Keys) – A pair of music-themed monsters employed by Lord Arcanon. Conductro's baton can conduct anything while Screech's trumpet can turn anyone who hears it into enthralled zombies. Arcanon tasks Conductro and Screech with turning the Rangers and Amber Beach's citizens into zombies. However, the Rangers use special headphones to block out Screech's music before weakening him and Conductro. The pair later attend to a weakened Arcanon, only to be destroyed by Sledge.
