= Farzana Doctor =

Canadian novelist and social worker

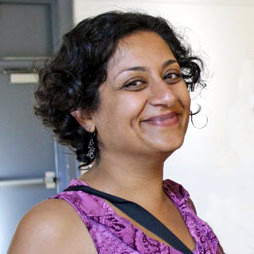
- Farzana Doctor
- Born: Zambia
- Occupation: Writer
- Writing career
- Period: 2000s-present
- Notable work: Six Metres of Pavement
- Notable awards: 2011 Dayne Ogilvie Prize; 2012 Lambda Literary Award for Lesbian Fiction
- Website: www.farzanadoctor.com

Farzana Doctor is a Canadian novelist and social worker.

== Biography ==
Born in Zambia to Dawoodi Bohra Muslim expatriate parents from India, she immigrated to Canada with her family in the early 1970s.

She has published three novels to date, and won the 2011 Dayne Ogilvie Grant from the Writers' Trust of Canada for an emerging lesbian, gay, bisexual or transgender writer. Her second novel, Six Metres of Pavement, was also a nominee for the 2012 Lambda Literary Awards in the category of Lesbian Fiction, and was announced as the winner of the award on June 4, 2012. In 2017, it won the One Book, One Brampton award. In 2015, her third novel, All Inclusive, was released in Canada, and it was later released in the US in 2017. It was a Kobo 2015 and National Post Best Book of the Year.

In addition to her writing career, Doctor works as a registered social worker, in a private psychotherapy practice, coordinates a regular reading series in Toronto's Brockton Village neighbourhood, and coproduced Rewriting The Script: A Loveletter to Our Families, a documentary film about the family relationships of LGBT people in Toronto's South Asian immigrant communities.

CBC Books listed Doctor's 2020 novel Seven on its list of Canadian fiction to watch for in spring 2020.

== Books ==
- Stealing Nasreen (2007)
- Six Metres of Pavement (Dundurn Press, 2011)
- All Inclusive (Dundurn Press, 2015)
- Seven (Dundurn Press, 2020)
