= Cat Sebastian =

American writer

Cat Sebastian is an American author who writes under the pen name. Sebastian is known for her work in queer Regency romances. Sebastian won the 2024 LAMBDA Literary Award for Gay Romance for her novel, We Could Be So Good. Her 2026 novel, Star Shipped, made the USA Today Best Seller list.

== Early life and education ==
Sebastian was born in Scotch Plains, New Jersey.

== Career ==
Sebastian had postpartum depression when her children were young. As a way to cope, Sebastian found solace in Regency Historical Romance novels by authors such as Georgette Heyer, Julia Quinn and Cecilia Grant, seeking a more "full-on escape". When she starting reading books by KJ Charles, she recognized that there was space for queer characters as well. The first book she wrote was 2016's The Soldier’s Scoundrel (Jack and Oliver). Sebastian began to expand out of the genre of Historical Romance novels when she wrote We Could Be So Good which won a Lambda Literary Award for Gay Romance in 2024. Her 2026 novel Star Shipped was her first in the Contemporary Romance genre.

Author Rachel Reid credits Sebastian as being the "turning point" in readers' discovery of Heated Rivalry, when Sebastian recommended the book on social media in 2019.

== Novels ==
YEAR	SERIES	TITLE	CIT
2016	Turner Series	The Soldier’s Scoundrel (Jack and Oliver)	
2017		The Lawrence Browne Affair (Lawrence and Georgie)	
		The Ruin of a Rake (Courtenay and Julian)	
		A Little Light Mischief (Molly and Alice)	
2018	Regency Impostor Series	Unmasked by the Marquess (Alistair and Charity)	
2019		A Duke in Disguise (Verity and Ash)	
2019		A Delicate Deception (Amelia and Sydney)	
2017	Sedgewick Series	It Takes Two to Tumble (Phillip and Ben)	
2018		A Gentleman Never Keeps Score (Hartley and Sam)	
2019	Page & Sommers Series	Hither, Page	
2022		The Missing Page	
2020		Two Rogues Make a Right (Will and Martin)	
2021	The Cabots Series	Tommy Cabot Was Here	
2021		Peter Cabot Gets Lost	
2022		Daniel Cabot Puts Down Roots	
2023		Luke and Billy Finally Get a Clue	
2021	The London Highwaymen	The Queer Principles of Kit Webb	
2022		The Perfect Crimes of Marian Hayes	
2023	Midcentury NYC (The Chronicle books)	We Could Be So Good	
2024		You Should Be So Lucky	
2026	Contemporary Romance	Starshipped	
