= Brad Boney =

American author of gay and lesbian fiction

Brad Boney is an American author of gay and lesbian fiction. Two of his novels have been finalists for the Lambda Literary Award for Gay Romance.

== Personal life ==
Born in Findlay, Ohio, Boney lived in Washington, D.C., and Houston before settling in Austin, Texas.

Boney attended New York University.

== Awards ==
Awards for Boney's writing
Year	Title	Award/Honor	Result	Ref.
2013	The Nothingness of Ben	Lambda Literary Award for Gay Romance	Finalist	
2013	The Return	Rainbow Award for Best Gay Contemporary General Fiction	3rd Place	
2016	Yes	Lambda Literary Award for Gay Romance	Finalist	

== Publications ==
- Yes (2016)
- Brothers Across Time (2018)

=== Austin trilogy ===
- The Nothingness of Ben (2012)
- The Return (2013)
- The Eskimo Slugger (2014)
