= The Dust Palace =

Circus theatre company in New Zealand

The Dust Palace Circus Theatre Company
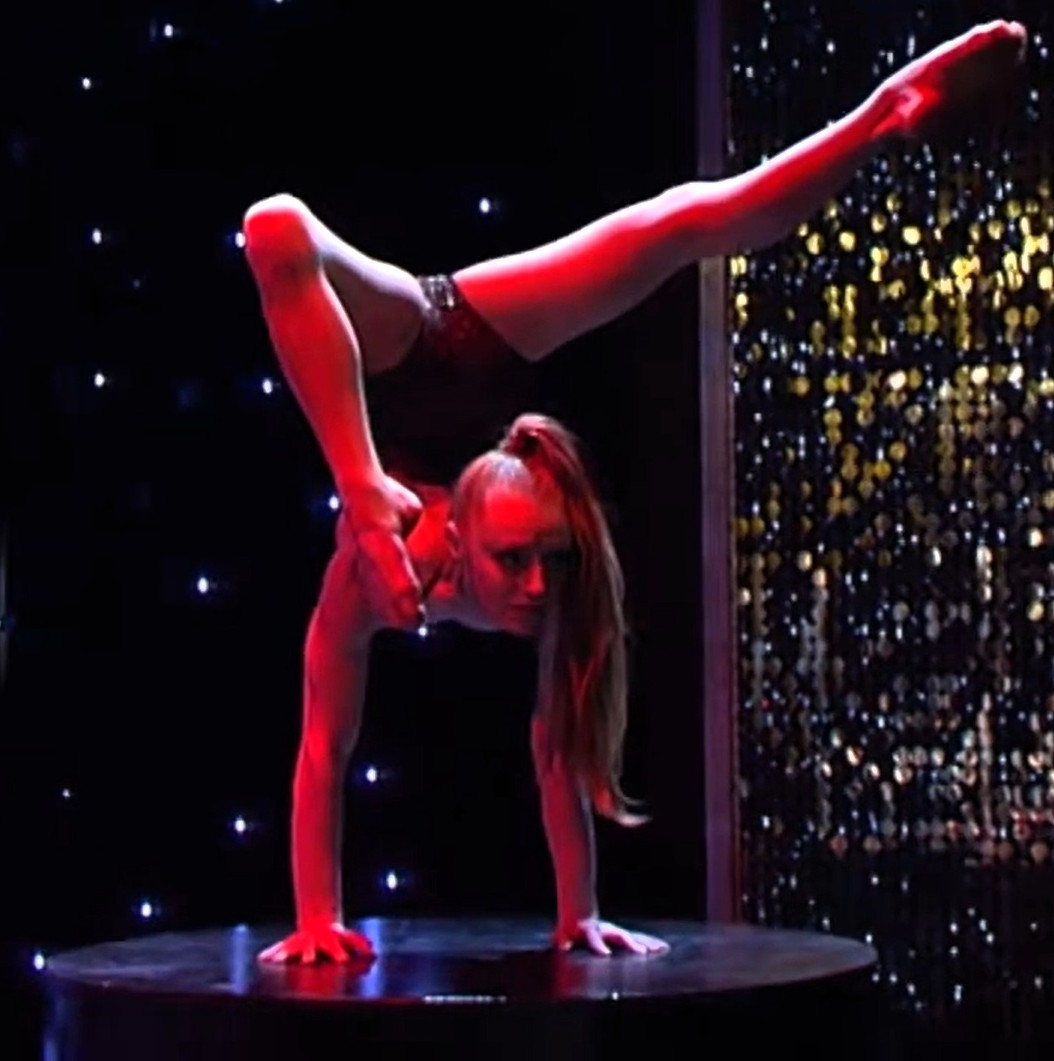
- Rochelle Mangan in Human in 2018
- Formation: 2009
- Type: Theatre group
- Purpose: Physical circus theatre
- Location: Auckland, New Zealand
- Artistic director: Eve Gordon
- Website: thedustpalace.co.nz

The Dust Palace is a circus theatre company based in Auckland, New Zealand. It was co-founded by actors Eve Gordon and Mike Edward in 2009.

The Dust Palace performs original devised works incorporating traditional theatre, physical theatre, dance and circus arts.

== History ==
In 2009 Eve Gordon created burlesque show Burlesque As You Like It: Not A Family Show for the Auckland Fringe Festival which questioned the place of burlesque in contemporary society and engaged with its political and theatrical beginnings. The company was formed with members of the cast and crew following the success of this show.

Ellerslie Arts Centre, home of the Dust Palace, 2025 - present

The company was invited to open Q Theatre’s Loft space in 2011. For this they devised Venus Is... which follows the conversation, and corresponding reverie, of an older couple reflecting on their relationship.

Love and Money (2011) was first developed for the Hastings Opera House, re-developed for TAPAC Theatre Auckland 2012, and again in 2013 for Downstage theatre, Wellington. The show is set in a strip club, and blends Mike Edward's semi-autobiographical narrative with physical comedy.

In 2012, the Dust Palace leased a warehouse in Auckland suburb Maungakiekie-Tamaki, Penrose which became their studio and also housed The Dust Palace School, which teaches circus skills to adults and children. A scholarship programme was started in 2014 to provide a year's worth of free classes for twelve young people.

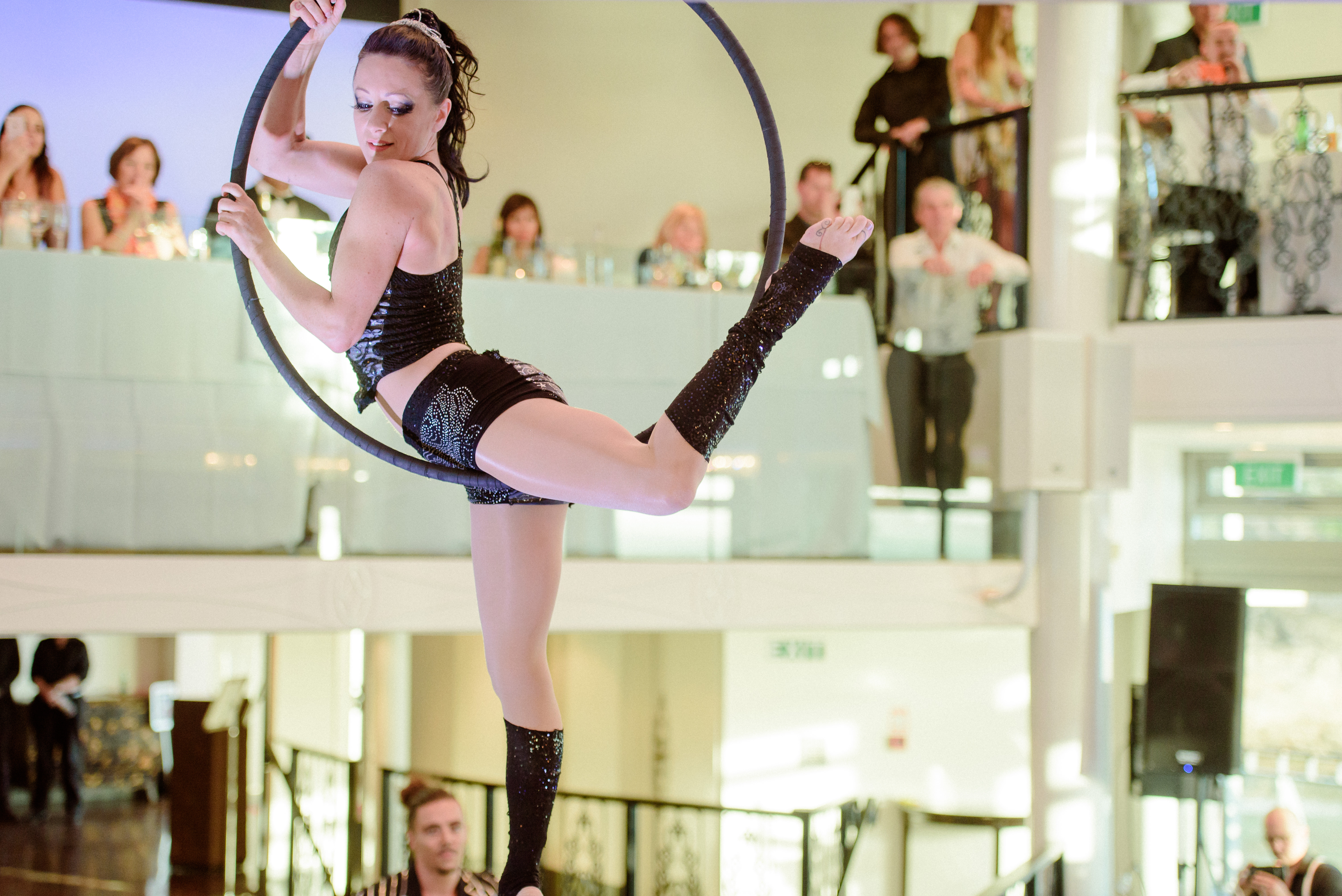
Eve Gordon at The Wharf 2017

Between 2012 and 2015, the company toured several shows: ...with a stranger... to Oamaru, Ashburton and Nelson; Love and Money and Venus is... were performed at Erupt, the Lake Taupo Festival; and Cirque non Sequitur was staged at the Fuel Festival, Hamilton, Q Theatre, Auckland and at the Right Royal Cabaret Festival in Taranaki.

Top of the Heap (2012) began as a performance installation made for Splore, set on a pile of furniture. Ithaca (2015) was a cirque-musical re-telling of Homer’s epic narrative poem The Odyssey, set as a space opera.

In 2016, Eve Gordon began adapting Christina Rossetti's narrative poem Goblin Market, into circus theatre. The Goblin Market was picked up at OFF-CINARS for a season at The Cultch in Vancouver and The Centaur in Montreal.

In 2017, The Dust Palace and The Auckland Philharmonia Orchestra created large-scale collaborative work Midnight staged at the Kiri Te Kanawa Theatre, Aotea Centre. Midnight was the beginning of a trilogy of works, set in the same world, and was followed by Dawn in 2019.

In 2018 another large-scale production, Le Cirque Volé was staged at the Palmerston North Stadium.

In 2019, The Dust Palace moved to a new, larger premises with better facilities for creating circus theatre. Angel for Breakfast debuted at Splore Festival; The Goblin Market went on tour; Human was performed at the ILT Stadium Southland; The WonderWombs toured Nelson, Blenheim, Carterton and Auckland.

In 2020, The Dust Palace toured The WonderWombs to Vancouver and developed PULP for Hamilton Gardens Festival. Ithaca was re-developed for the Palmerston North stadium.

In 2021, The Dust Palace devised cabaret show Haus of Yolo in which the performers sew their own costumes on stage. Also developed was The Ice Cream is Melting!, an environmentally focussed show for 4 - 8 year olds.

In 2022, The Dust Palace began work on a collaboration with Te Rēhia Theatre Company, Te Tangi a te Tūī, co-written by Amber Cureen. An excerpt of Te Tangi a te Tūī was performed for the opening of the Sir Howard Morrison Centre in Rotorua; the full show premiered in 2023 at The Cultch in Vancouver; and it had a season at the Auckland Arts Festival in 2024.

In 2023, The Dust Palace helped form Te Kura Maninirau, a kaupapa Māori circus school, in collaboration with Te Pou Theatre.

In 2025, The Dust Palace moved premises to the Ellerslie Arts Centre.

On June 8, 2025, The Dust Palace's storage unit burned down and most of their equipment and archives were lost.

== Productions ==
- Burlesque As You Like It: Not A Family Show (2009)
- The Moon's Insane and other stories... (2009)
- The Sexy Recession Cabaret (2009) (co-production)
- Love and Money (2010)
- Venus is... (2011)
- Cirque Non Sequitur (2012)
- ...with a stranger... (2013)
- Same Same But Different (2013)
- Knock, Knock (2013)
- Top of the Heap (2015)
- Ithaca (2015)
- The Goblin Market (2016)
- Midnight (2017)
- Human (2018)
- The WonderWombs (2018)
- Dawn (2019)
- PULP (2020)
- Ithaca (2020)
- HAUS of YOLO (2021)
- The Ice Cream is Melting! (2021)
- Te Tangi a te Tūī (2023)
