= Jim Provenzano =

American journalist

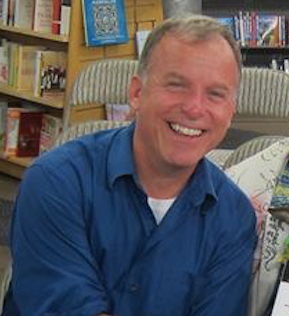
- Provenzano in 2015

Jim Provenzano is an American author, playwright, and editor with the Bay Area Reporter.

== Early life and career ==
Provenzano graduated from Ashland High School in Ashland, Ohio. As a student at Kent State University, he performed in a stage production of Agatha Christie's The Mousetrap and the title role in a 1981 production of The Who's musical Tommy. After transferring to Ohio State University in 1981, he graduated with a Bachelor of Fine Arts in dance in 1985.

He directed productions of the Sam Shepard plays Cowboy Mouth and Action. In 1987 he was a dancer with the Bill Cratty Dance Theater and performed at The Yard on Martha's Vineyard. In 1988, he directed a New Jersey production of William M. Hoffman's AIDS drama As Is. In 1989, with Nick Jouriles, he performed his dance work "Held Up" at the Dance Theater Workshop's Fresh Tracks series.

== Later career ==
Provenzano moved to San Francisco in 1992 to become an assistant editor for the Bay Area Reporter, an LGBTQ community newspaper. In 1996 Bay Area Reporter editor Mike Salinas asked him to write a column covering the LGBT athletics community. The column, titled "Sports Complex", was published weekly until 2006. It was internationally syndicated from 2004 to 2006 and covered the California AIDSRide, the Gay Games and Outgames, interviews with, and articles about, gay and lesbian athletes. Provenzano returned as an editor with the Bay Area Reporter in September 2006. In 2010, he co-created and became editor of BARtab, the Reporters (initially monthly, then weekly) LGBT nightlife guide. In 2020, he was promoted to Arts & Entertainment Editor at the Bay Area Reporter.

Provenzano's debut novel PINS (1999) is about gay high school wrestlers. A review in The Advocate praised Provenzano's humor and "swift and flexible style". Provenzano adapted PINS for the stage, and it premiered at New Conservatory Theatre Center in 2002. Reviewing the play for the San Francisco Chronicle, critic Robert Hurwitt wrote that "Provenzano doesn't succeed in pinning his subject dramatically, but he wrestles with his themes thoughtfully and, for the most part, to entertaining effect." A Chicago staging took place in 2006. In 2005, Provenzano helped produce an exhibit for the GLBT Historical Society on gay and lesbian athletics.

His novel Every Time I Think of You won the Lambda Literary Award for Gay Romance in 2012. The Lambda Literary review called it "a moving and satisfying read". Message of Love was selected as a Lambda Literary Award finalist in 2015.

In 2018, he published Now I'm Here. Set mostly in rural Ohio in the 1970s and 1980s, it focuses on a gay piano prodigy who gains fame for his piano solo version of Queen's "Bohemian Rhapsody," and his relationship with the son of a pumpkin farmer. In 2020 he released Finding Tulsa, the faux-memoir of gay film director Stan Grozniak, who reconnects with his teenage crush from a 1970s summer theatre production of the musical Gypsy.

Some of Provenzano's papers, including materials from his work at OutWeek and Hunt, his activism with ACT UP and Queer Nation, and the Sporting Life exhibit, are held at the Online Archive of California.

In September 2026, the National Lesbian & Gay Journalists Association bestowed him the annual Lisa Ben Award for Achievement in Features Coverage.

== Personal life ==
Provenzano is openly gay. He lives in San Francisco.

== Works ==
=== Fiction ===
- PINS (1999)
- Monkey Suits (2003)
- Cyclizen (2007)
- Every Time I Think of You (2011)
- Message of Love (2014)
- Forty Wild Crushes: stories (2016)
- Now I'm Here (2018)
- Finding Tulsa (2020)
- Lessons in Teenage Biology, a novella (2024)

=== Plays ===
- PINS (2002, adapted from his novel)
- Bootless Cries (1998)
- Under the River (1988)
