= Something Like Summer (film) =

- Directed by: David Berry
- Screenplay by: Carlos Pedraza
- Story by: Jay Bell
- Produced by: David Berry; Tom Ly; Carlos Pedraza; J. T. Tepnapa; Christopher Toyne
- Starring: Grant Davis; Davi Santos; Ben Baur; Ajiona Alexus; Jana Lee Hamblin
- Cinematography: David Berry
- Music by: Cian McCarthy
- Release date: February 25, 2017 (Sydney Mardi-Gras)
- Running time: 115 minutes
- Country: United States
- Language: English

Something Like Summer is a 2017 drama musical film based upon the 2011 Young Adult novel Something Like Summer by Jay Bell and the first entry in the Something Like... series.

== Plot ==
Benjamin, a 17 year-old openly gay high school student in Houston, Texas, falls for Tim, a popular athlete who is initially closeted about his sexuality. Their secret relationship begins after a chance encounter but is fraught with challenges related to their differing levels of comfort with their sexual identities.

As their high school years progress, the pressures of keeping their relationship hidden lead to tension and an eventual breakup. Tim moves away for college, and their lives diverge. During this period, Ben meets Jace Holden, an airline steward, and they develop a stable and loving relationship. However, Tim re-enters Ben's life, now openly gay and seeking to rekindle their romance.

Tim creates friction between Jace and Ben. Eventually, Ben realizes how Tim has been manipulating him into getting back together at the expense of his relationship with Jace. Jace and Ben make up, confirming their commitment to each other, and they get married.

Some time later, Jace abruptly dies, leaving Ben heartbroken. He returns home at the insistence of his best friend, where he reunites with Tim, who apologizes for his past behavior, and the two are left starting a fresh relationship.

== Characters ==
- Grant Davis as Benjamin "Ben" Bentley
- Ben Baur as Jace Holden
- Ajiona Alexus as Allison Cross
- Davi Santos as Tim Wyman
- Jana Lee Hamblin as Mrs. Bentley
- Ron Boyd as Mr. Bentley
- Tristan Decker as Bryce Hunter
- Madisyn Lane as Krista Norman

== Reception ==
Eye for Film reviewed the movie, writing that "Overall, Something Like Summer is very good at what it does, but what it does never really gets beyond the superficial." Film Inquiry also wrote a review, stating "On balance, there is more to like in Something Like Summer than dislike but it doesn’t make it easy: for the most part it feels sincere, wears its heart on its sleeve and considers some profound thematic material – but its issue with plot developments and characters drag it down considerably."
