= Davi Santos =

American actor (born 1990)

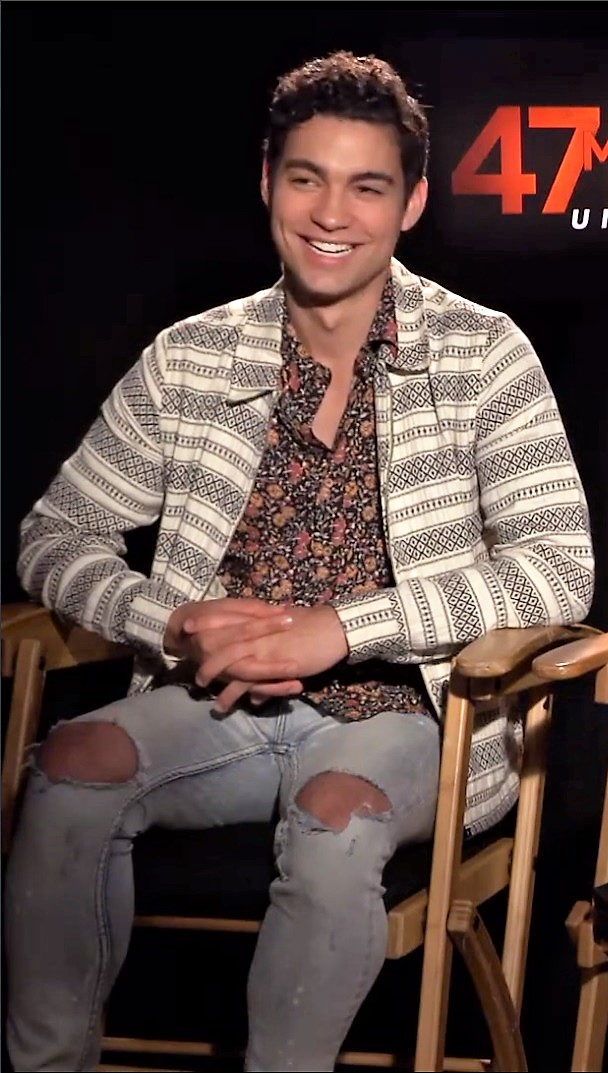
- Santos interviewed about 47 Meters Down: Uncaged by Dulce Osuna in 2019
- Born: February 1, 1990 (age 36); Rio de Janeiro, Brazil
- Education: Macaulay Honors College
- Occupation: Actor
- Years active: 2015–present
- Notable work: Power Rangers Dino Charge; The Cure

Davi Santos (born 1 February 1990) is an American actor, best known for his role playing Sir Ivan, The Gold Ranger on the television series Power Rangers Dino Charge and Dr. Joey Costa on Good Sam. He is a screenwriter and star of The Cure, a film that world premiered at Cannes Film Festival.

== Early life ==
Santos was born in Rio de Janeiro. In late 1990, Santos' family immigrated to New York City, and he was raised in Astoria, a neighborhood in the northwestern corner of Queens.

Santos attended the Professional Performing Arts School alongside Connor Paolo and Sarah Hyland. He graduated from LaGuardia Arts "Fame" High School. In 2008, Santos enrolled in Macaulay Honors College at Lehman College where he designed the courses of his customized CUNY BA in Cognitive Philosophy and Theatrical Arts. At Lehman, he acted in a production of Arthur Miller's A View from the Bridge directed by Susan Soetaert in 2010. Since the age of eight, he has trained in martial arts. He holds a second Dan Black-belt in Shotokan Karate.

== Career ==
With a background in theatre and commercials, Santos appeared Off-Broadway between 2009 and 2012 in plays premiering at New York Theatre Festival, Samuel French Play Festival and the New York International Fringe Festival. In his late teens, he wrote and appeared in the coming of age docufiction, Lone Prophet, utilizing guerrilla filmmaking in support of the DREAM Act. In 2011, he collaborated with Christopher J. Lopez to create Densely Hollow Films. Their first film, The Cure, premiered at the Palais des Festivals et des Congress at Cannes Film Festival.

A self-tape audition led Santos to an appearance on the ABC comedy series Don't Trust the B— in Apartment 23, after which he joined the cast of the American sitcom Mr. Box Office for two seasons. He continued making television appearances on Nickelodeon's How to Rock, and ABC Family's Switched at Birth, Mystery Girls and Chasing Life.

In 2014, Santos was cast as Sir Ivan of Zandar, the Gold Ranger, on Power Rangers Dino Charge for two seasons. He would reprise the role in two episodes of Power Rangers Beast Morphers, "Finders Keepers" and "Grid Connection". In 2017, he starred in the film Something Like Summer based on the acclaimed novel of the same title. The same year, Densely Hollow Films began principal photography on its feature debut, Adrift, produced by James Manos Jr., in which Santos starred opposite Lauren Velez and Tony Plana. Santos also appeared in the horror film Polaroid, which was released in 2019.

In July 2018, Santos was cast as Gabe for the first season of the CBS All Access fantasy drama series Tell Me a Story, which premiered that October.

== Personal life ==
Santos has said he identifies with the LGBT community.

== Filmography ==
=== Film ===
Year	Title	Role	Notes
2017	Something Like Summer	Tim Wyman	
2017	The Man from Earth: Holocene	Second Student	
2019	Polaroid	Tyler	
2019	47 Meters Down: Uncaged	Ben	
2021	13 Minutes	Daniel	

=== Television ===
Year	Title	Role	Notes
2012	How to Rock	Mark	Episode: "How to Rock a Good Deed"
2012-2013	Mr. Box Office	Carlos	recurring, 23 episodes
2013	Don't Trust the B— in Apartment 23	Anthony Pizzoli	Episode: "The Scarlet Neighbour"
2014	Switched at Birth	Martin	Episode: "Love Among the Ruins"
2015–2016	Power Rangers Dino Charge	Sir Ivan/The Gold Ranger	Main Cast
2017	Kirby Buckets	Apollo	Episode: "Queen for a Dawn"
2017	Will & Grace	Twenty-Something	Episode: "Who's Your Daddy"
2017	Law & Order: True Crime	Andy Cano	recurring, 3 episodes
2018–2019	Tell Me a Story	Gabe Perez	Main Cast (season 1)
2020	Power Rangers Beast Morphers	Sir Ivan/The Gold Ranger	guest, 2 episodes (season 2)
2020	Kappa Kappa Die	Derrick	CW Seed Halloween special
2022	Good Sam	Dr. Joey Costa	Series regular; 12 episodes

=== Video Games ===
Year	Title	Role
2021	Call of Duty: Vanguard	Gustavo Dos Santos
2023	Call of Duty: Modern Warfare III	Additional Voices
2025	Mafia: The Old Country	Gennaro Fontanella
2025	Battlefield 6	Matthew Blake

=== Podcasts ===
Year	Title	Role	Notes	Ref.
2020	The Shadow Diaries	Trevor Roland	Voice role	
