= Jay Bell (writer) =

American novelist

- Born: February 19, 1977 (age 49)
- Occupation: Novelist
- Years active: 2010–present
- Known for: Kamikaze boys; Something Like Summer
- Website: jaybellbooks.com

Jay Bell (born February 19, 1977) is an American writer and the author of the Something Like... series. The first novel in the series, Something like Summer, was adapted into a feature film by Blue Seraph Productions under the direction of David Berry and screenwriter Carlos Pedraza.

== Personal life ==
A native of Kansas, Bell moved to Germany where he lived for ten years with his husband, artist and industrial designer Andreas Bell. The couple now live in Chicago.

== Awards and honors ==
In 2012, Something Like Summer was included in Amazon's Best Books of 2011: Gay & Lesbian list, and nominated for to the 24th Lambda Literary Awards in the category of Gay Romance

In 2013, Bell won the 25th Lambda Literary Awards in the category of Gay Romance for his novel Kamikaze Boys.

== Publications ==
=== Something like... series ===
- Book 1: Something Like Summer (2011)
- Book 2: Something Like Winter (2012)
- Book 3: Something Like Autumn (2013)
- Book 4: Something Like Spring (2014)
- Book 5: Something Like Lightning (2014)
- Book 6: Something Like Thunder (2015)
- Book 7: Something Like Stories - Volume 1 (2015)
- Book 8: Something Like Hail (2016)
- Book 9: Something Like Rain (2016)
- Book 10: Something Like Stories - Volume 2 (2017)
- Book 11: Something Like Forever (2017)
- Book 12: Something Like Stories - Volume 3 (2020)
- Online: Something Like Daybreak (2022)
- Companion story: Something Like Fall (2015)
- When Ben Loved Tim (He Loved Him Book 1) (2024)
- When Ben Loved Jace (He Loved Him Book 2) (2025)
- When Ben Loved Jason (He Loved Him Book 3) (2026)

=== Pride High series ===
- Pride High, Book One: Red (2022)
- Pride High, Book Two: Orange (2023)
- Pride High, Book Three: Yellow (2023)
- Pride High, Book Four: Green (2024)
- Pride High, Book Five: Blue (2025)

=== Loka Legends series ===
- Story: Finding Fire
- Book 1: The Cat in the Cradle
- Story: Flesh and Blood
- Book 2: From Darkness to Darkness

=== Other work ===
- Kamikaze Boys
- Hell's Pawn
- Language Lessons
- Like and Subscribe
- Straight Boy
- The Boy At the Bottom of the Fountain
- Out of Time, Into You
- Icarus and Apollo
- Switch!
- Blank Slate
