= Eve Gordon (New Zealand actress) =

New Zealand actress and aerialist (born 1982)

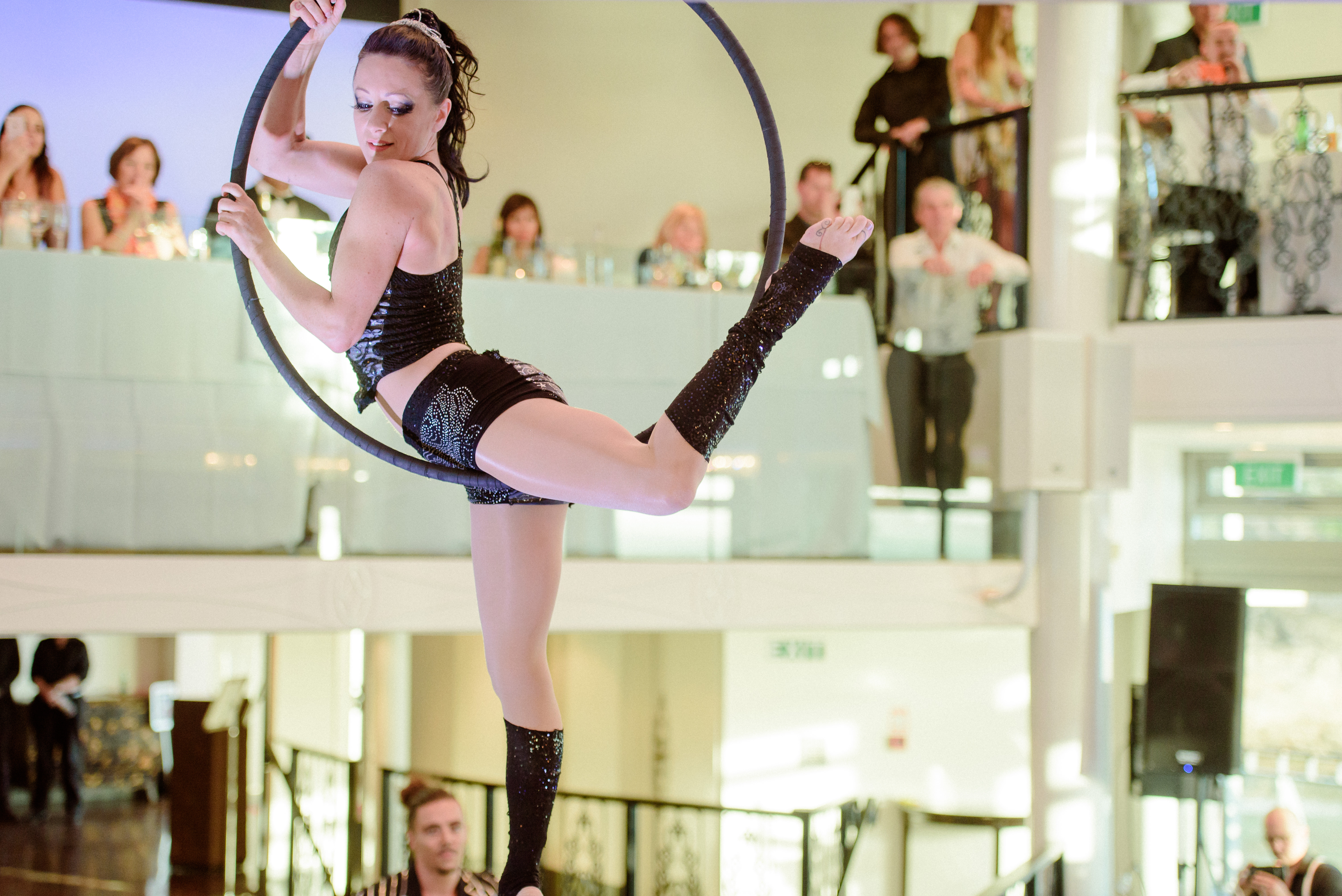
- Gordon at The Wharf
- Born: 16 March 1982 (age 44); New Zealand
- Occupations: Actress, aerialist
- Years active: 2003–present

Eve Gordon (born 16 March 1982) is a New Zealand actress and performer and producer of physical and aerial theatre.

== Background ==
Gordon graduated with a Bachelor of Performing and Screen Arts from UNITEC in Auckland in 2002.

== Career ==
Her television appearances include Mercy Peak, Power Rangers and Shortland Street, but she is best known as Stacey, a cycle courier and reincarnated Norse goddess Fulla in the fantasy series The Almighty Johnsons.

During the 2000s, Gordon collaborated with Sam Hamilton in live performances with The Parasitic Fantasy Band in the New Zealand International Film Festival, public galleries, and the New Zealand Film Archive. The work included multi-screen film projectors, lighting effects, gongs, story-telling and occasionally some circus or physical theatre performance.

Gordon co-founded circus theatre company The Dust Palace with Mike Edward in 2009, after working with a group of friends on a show at Auckland's first Fringe Festival. The Dust Palace has an international profile and has toured Canada. Gordon works mainly as artistic director and aerial performer, but also variously in costume, sound and lighting design.

For her performance in Midnight, a collaboration between the Auckland Philharmonia Orchestra and The Dust Palace in 2017, Gordon learned the aerial performance art cloud swing (corde volante). She said about this experience:

When you get the moves right, it's the closest thing to flying there is. That is pure happiness for me – flying through the air – it's also terrifying, but what's life about if you're not a little scared?

== Filmography ==
Film and television
Year	Title	Role	Notes
2003	Mercy Peak	Sarah, Fantasy Girl	Episode: "The Book I Read"
2003	Redhead – The Lucille Ball Story	Lucy's Classmate	
2005	King Kong	Hat Check Girl	
2006	Anguish	Sarah	
2006	Salt	Eve	
2008	Ergotism	Sharon	
2009	Shortland Street	Charlie Mills	
2011–2013	The Almighty Johnsons	Stacey	Series regular
2014	Shortland Street	Lisa Pimms	Recurring character
2015–2016	Power Rangers Dino Charge	Keeper (suit actress)	
2015	Westside	Pat	
2016	Power Rangers Dino Super Charge	Ms. Sandra, Witch	Episodes: "Riches and Rags" and "Trick or Trial"
2018	Power Rangers Super Ninja Steel	Witch	Episode: "Monster Mix-Up"

== Personal life ==
She was raised in Rotorua.

In 2013, she married Mike Edward who she met at drama school.
