= Boyfriends with Girlfriends =

Book by Alex Sánchez

- Author: Alex Sánchez
- Language: English
- Genre: Young adult
- Publisher: Simon & Schuster Children's Publishing
- Publication date: April 19, 2011
- Publication place: United States
- Media type: Print
- Pages: 224 pgs
- ISBN: 1416937730

Boyfriends with Girlfriends is a 2011 young adult novel by Alex Sánchez. The book was published by Simon & Schuster and deals with the pressures of teens coming to terms with their sexuality and of coming of age. Sanchez began working on the novel after receiving e-mails from teens who were being criticized by both their straight and homosexual peers for being bisexual. Boyfriends with Girlfriends has been nominated for a Lambda Literary Award and was a 2012 ALA Rainbow Bridge List novel.

== Plot ==
Boyfriends with Girlfriends follows several teens (seventeen years old or younger) as they attempt to figure out who they are to themselves, to each other, and to the world. Lance and Sergio are attracted to each other, but Sergio's only serious relationship was with a girl. Allie and Kimiko have fallen hard for each other, leaving Allie confused. She has a boyfriend and doesn't know what her attraction to Kimiko means for her sexuality or for her relationship with her boyfriend. Kimiko suffers from poor self-esteem and from the expectations of her mother, who wants her to be a good Japanese girl, feminine and demure.

== Reception ==
Critical reception for Boyfriends with Girlfriends has been mostly positive, with Booklist giving the novel a positive review and Time Out Chicago making it a recommended "beach read". The Bay Area Reporter wrote that although "all the teen-speak ('hella' this and 'like' that) and formulaic romantic-comedy foibles approach overkill", Sanchez "delivers it with panache and a grasp on lightning-fast, alternating narrative perspectives". Kirkus Reviews was ambivalent about the book, stating that the book was "upbeat" but that the "stereotypes and clunky slang" marred the read. The Lambda Literary Foundation praised the book, calling it "fulfilling and as enriching as any of his other novels". The GLBT Round Table of the American Library Association also praised the book, focusing on the portrayal of bisexuality as a highlight of the novel. A teen reviewer for the School Library Journal liked the novel, but found the ending was too abrupt and the dialogue "commercial". Another reviewer for the School Library Journal found the book too predictable but praised Sánchez for "tackling the bisexuality issue". After Elton wrote that Sánchez "continues to break new ground" and that the novel was "a cleanly-written, very readable, slightly soap opera-y story".

== Disambiguation ==
- Not to be confused with Boyfriends and Girlfriends.
