= Martha Miller =

Midwestern lesbian author (born 1947)

- Born: Martha Jane Thompson; December 21, 1947 (age 77); Springfield, Illinois
- Education: Sangamon State University, BA University of Illinois, Springfield, MA
- Occupation(s): Author of novels and short stories, journalist and critic, English professor (retired 2015)
- Spouse: Ann Lynn Steiner
- Children: Phillip Duane Miller, 1973—2018 Andrew Ryan Miller, 1975—2018
- Website: https://www.marthamiller.net

Martha Miller is a writer and English professor best known for her stories that explore gay and lesbian life across genres including crime, YA, and memoir.

== Biography ==
Martha Jane Thompson was born on December 21, 1947 in Springfield Illinois to World War II veteran, Carl E. Thompson and A. Geraldine (Drum) Thompson. Miller graduated from Feitshans High School, in 1965.

She married Phillip Dale Miller in 1971 and had two sons, Phillip and Andrew. In 1989, Miller got sober, divorced her husband, and came out as a lesbian.

She met and Ann Lynn Steiner since 1994. They married July 10, 2011 when same-sex civil unions were legalized in Illinois.

=== Education and Career ===
Miller earned her BA from Sangamon State University and her MA from University of Illinois, Springfield.

Until she retired in 2015, Miller was an English instructor at Benedictine University at Springfield, IL, Lincoln Land Community College, and Richland Community College, Decatur, IL.

In 1984, Miller joined AA, came out, and began writing, focussing on gay and lesbian themes. She wrote short stories including lesbian erotica for On Our Backs and the short story anthologies, Herotica published by Susie Bright and Joani Blank.

Miller has written extensive portrayals of actual and fictional gay and lesbian life. She's gained wide recognition in the LGBTQ community and writing circles. Her book Retirement Plan: a Crime Story was a finalist in the 2011 Lambda Literary Awards, her short story,"At the Last Minute" won the Raymond Carver Short Fiction Award, her book Widow was a finalist in the Golden Crown Literary Awards, and her story "Skin to Skin" was won a five thousand dollar award from the Illinois Arts Council and was a finalist for the ASTEREA Lesbian Writers Awards. The play, "Billy's Voice," a one act play about a woman who has lost her son to AIDS had four encore performances, was staged at the Little Castro Theater in San Francisco, and was published in the arts journal, "Modern Words."

During the AIDS epidemic, Miller developed a five-week workshop in which a group of men with AIDS and HIV wrote stories about themselves. She received a Lila Wallace Grant for this project in 1995 and held the workshop at her local SARA (Springfield AIDS Resource Association) Center.

Miller wrote Tales from the Levee in 2005, a "mythology" rather than a history of a vanished gay community of Springfield, Illinois that relied on interviews with lesbians, gay men and drag queens that frequented the Levee area.

Miller has written nine books, published over twenty-four short stories, and wrote the column "Martha [lesbian] Living" for Prairie Flame for many years. She is a member of the Author's Guild, Sisters in Crime, CORAL (Coalition of Rainbow Alliances), and the Society of Midland Authors.

== Books ==
=== Novels ===
- Torrid Summer, Sapphire Press May 22, 2024. ISBN 1959929267
- Me Inside, Sapphire Press September 1, 2020 ISBN 1952270065
- Widow: A Mystery, Bold Strokes Books. 2014 ISBN 1626392145
- Retirement Plan: a Crime Novel, Bold Strokes Books. May 16, 2011 ISBN 1602822247
- Dispatch to Death: A Mystery, New Victoria Publishers, Vermont. Fall of 2003 ISBN 1892281201
- Nine Nights on the Windy Tree: A Mystery, New Victoria Publishers. Vermont. 2000. Translated to German and republished in 2001 by Adriane Krimi 1135, Argument Verlag ISBN 1892281112

=== Short Fiction ===
- "Motordrome Molly," Our Happy Hours: LGBT Voices From the Gay Bars. Winter 2017
- "At the Last Minute" Carve Magazine. Summer 2009
- "Elise Riley" (Anthology) Women Writing Mysteries. ed. by Katherine Forrest. Spinster's Ink. Winter. 2004
- "Garden of the Hungry Cats." (Anthologies) Sappho Says 1999, All the Women Were Heroes, 1998; Common Lives, Vol. #42, Spring 1992, Skin to Skin, New Victoria Press, 1998
- "Unsent Letter." (Anthology) All the Women Were Heroes, 1998
- Skin to Skin: Erotic Lesbian Love Stories. New Victoria Publishers. Vermont, 1998 ISBN 0934678863
- "The Sirocco." Bad Attitude, Spring 1996
- "Hormones." Herotica 4, New American Library/Plume Spring 1996. ISBN 0452271819
- "Billy's Voice." (Play) modern words, Summer 1995
- "Best Friends." Herotica 3, NAL-Plume, Spring 1994 ISBN 0452271800
- "Life Signs." The Evergreen Chronicles, Fall 1993
- "Seductions." Herotica 2, Plume, Spring 1992 ISBN 0452267870
- "Tell Me About California." Common Lives Vol. #42, Spring 1992.
- "Gremlins and Gypsy Moths." The Evergreen Chronicles, Summer 1991
- "Mea Culpa." (Anthologies) The Alchemist, Spring 1991; Common Lives Vol. # 31, Summer 1989
- "Reflections on Mars; or Sunrise on the 405." Common Lives Vol. # 37, Winter 1991
- "Scar Tissue." Battered But Not Broken, Fall 1990
- "Lady Verushka's Lover." Amethyst, Summer 1990
- "Last Trip to the Yukon." The Writer's Bar B–Q, Vol. # 5, Spring 1990
- "Obsession." On Our Backs, May–June 1990
- "Queen of Tanqueray." Common Lives Vol. # 25, Winter 1988
- "Watch of the Valkyrie." On Our Backs, Summer 1988
- "Shark's Tooth." The Writer's Bar B–Q, Vol. # 3, Fall 1988
- "Needs." Lovtann (translated) Oslo Norway, Winter 1989
- Common Lives, Vol. # 2, Spring 1987

=== Creative Non-Fiction ===
- Four Years: a Memoir, Royal Press Oct. 1, 2018 ISBN 9781619293885
- Tales from the Levee, Harrington, Southern Tier Press. 2005 ISBN 1560232978. Reprinted as an ebook 2016 Bold Strokes Press ISBN 9781619293885
- "No Queens on Pickett Street" In the Middle of the Middle West: An Anthology of Creative Non-Fiction, Ed. Becky Bradway. Indiana University Press. Spring 2003. ISBN 0253216575
- "Growing Old Gay: Life in Springfield for all These Years" Illinois Times. May 16, 2024
