= Toughskins =

Line of clothing sold by Sears, Roebuck and Co.

Toughskins were a line of clothing sold by Sears, Roebuck and Co. which were primarily marketed for their durability. When launched, the line consisted of children's jeans which were sold with the guarantee that children would grow out of them before the pants wore out.

A Sears brand-awareness survey determined that by 1973, Toughskins had become better known by mothers than the Levis brand, already a century old at that time.

Toughskins had reinforced knees for longer wear. They came in slim, regular, and husky sizes and were a blend of Dacron Type 59 polyester, DuPont 420 nylon, and cotton. Sears eventually expanded the line to include corduroy jeans, denim jackets, and men's work clothes.

Also mentioned in the song "Cool Kids" on the Chicago band Screeching Weasel's album Bark Like a Dog.
