= Something Like Summer (novel) =

2011 novel by Jay Bell

- Author: Jay Bell
- Cover artist: Andreas Bell
- Language: English
- Genre: Young adult, Romance, LGBT
- Publisher: CreateSpace Publishing
- Publication date: January 2011
- Publication place: United States
- Pages: 290 pp
- ISBN: 9781453875049

Something Like Summer is a 2011 novel by Jay Bell, and the first installment in the Something Like... series. It was adapted into a film of the same name in 2017. The novel centers around the life of Benjamin Bentley, a 17-year-old from Houston, Texas, and his tumultuous relationship with two love interests over the span of several years.

It deals primarily with themes of personal fulfillment, self-acceptance and the process of coming out.

== Plot ==
=== Plot summary ===
The novel is written from a third person limited point of view, told through the eyes of the book's main character, Benjamin (Ben) Bentley. It is divided into three separate sections based on the varying stages of Ben's life as the story is taking place.

The first part of the book, set in 1996 in Houston, Texas, focuses on the relationship Ben develops with Tim Wyman, another teenager who attends Ben's high school. Ben gradually helps Tim accept his repressed homosexuality and convinces him to break up with his girlfriend, whom Tim dated to maintain a heterosexual appearance. Although Ben and Tim eventually start dating, they break up after nearly being caught by the police while having sex in a public park. The two teenagers carry on with their lives and eventually go their separate ways.

The second part of the novel is set three years later in 1999, when Ben is a freshman in college and has relocated to Chicago. He meets flight attendant Jace Holden while flying back home for the holidays, and the two fall in love and decide to move in together. After Ben transfers to a new school in Austin, he discovers that Tim is also a student there. Tim, having fully embraced his sexuality, repeatedly meddles in Ben's relationship, deceiving him into believing Jace is cheating, hoping to reunite with Ben. When Ben discovers the truth, he leaves Tim and reconciles with Jace.

The third and final segment of the novel takes place in 2003. After graduating college, Ben begins working part-time as a speech therapist and an actor at a dinner theater. Ben and Jace eventually get married and buy a house together. Tim visits Ben after one of his theater performances and asks for help leaving his dysfunctional relationship with Ryan, a younger college student struggling with alcohol and drug abuse. After helping Tim, the two attempt to establish a platonic relationship. Ben soon realizes he can't remain platonic with Tim and decides to cut him out of his life, seemingly for good.

Jace's health deteriorates some years later after suffering from a brain hemorrhage, and he eventually succumbs to a brain aneurysm. In light of Jace's passing, Ben develops depression and contemplates suicide. His friend Allison turns to Tim for help, and reunites between the two. After realizing that Tim has turned his life around and overcome his previous hang-ups, Ben agrees to reform their teenage relationship.

=== Main characters ===
- Ben Bentley - The novel's main character, a gay teenager who is out to his friends and family. He develops an intimate relationship with Tim Wyman, though it quickly deteriorates due to the latter still being in the closet. He later develops feelings for another character, Jace Holden. Their relationship becomes strained when Tim re-enters Ben's life after having come to terms with his own sexuality.
- Tim Wyman - Ben's primary love interest during the first part of the novel, whose inability to accept his homosexuality serves as the catalyst for their eventual breakup. He makes recurring appearances later throughout.
- Jace Holden - A flight attendant who Ben meets on his way home during winter break, who he later ends up marrying.
- Allison Cross - Ben's best friend throughout the book, who indirectly serves as the voice of conscience for several characters in the series.

== Critical reception ==
The book was a finalist in the 24th Lambda Literary Awards under the category of gay romance.

== Film adaptation ==
Something Like Summer was adapted into a film by Blue Seraph Productions in 2017. The screenplay was written by producer Carlos Pedraza, and the film was directed by David Berry. Both men had previously worked in the production of another LGBTQIA+ film, Judas Kiss, in 2011. Actor Grant Davis played the lead role of Benjamin Bentley, while Davi Santos and Ben Baur played the roles of Tim and Jace, respectively. The movie was released on February 25, 2017.

Pedraza, who faced difficulties funding this movie, projected that fans of the book series contributed 20 to 30 percent of the film’s budget through crowdfunding sites, which in turn attracted conventional investors. Individuals who donated over $100 were recognized in the final credits with pictures of them and their romantic partner.

== School edition ==
A second edition of the novel was published by author Jay Bell in August 2017. The revised version, marketed as being more school friendly, largely removed the book's descriptions of sexual acts between the main characters. In his blog, Bell explained, "I really want to get Summer into schools and into the hands of young people, but the explicit content has always made that difficult." Additional changes were also made to alter the story's pacing.

== See also ==
- Gay teen fiction
