= List of people from Hinsdale, Illinois =

The following list includes notable people who were born or have lived in Hinsdale, Illinois. For a similar list organized alphabetically by last name, see the category page People from Hinsdale, Illinois.

== Authors and scientists ==
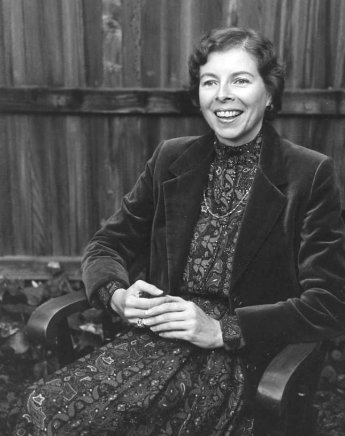
- Ann Bannon
  Ann Bannon (aka Ann Thayer or Weldy), author of lesbian pulp fiction (Odd Girl Out, I Am a Woman, Beebo Brinker)
- Paul Black, designer and writer of science fiction
- David J. Foulis, mathematician and professor
- Jay Freeman, known as saurik, creator of Cydia, the alternative to Apple's App Store
- Clark Kimberling, mathematician, musician, and composer
- Eric Ludy, best-selling author, speaker and president of Ellerslie Mission Society
- Milan Mrksich, chemist and vice president for Research at Northwestern University
- Patrick Piemonte, computer scientist, inventor, and human interface designer

== Acting ==
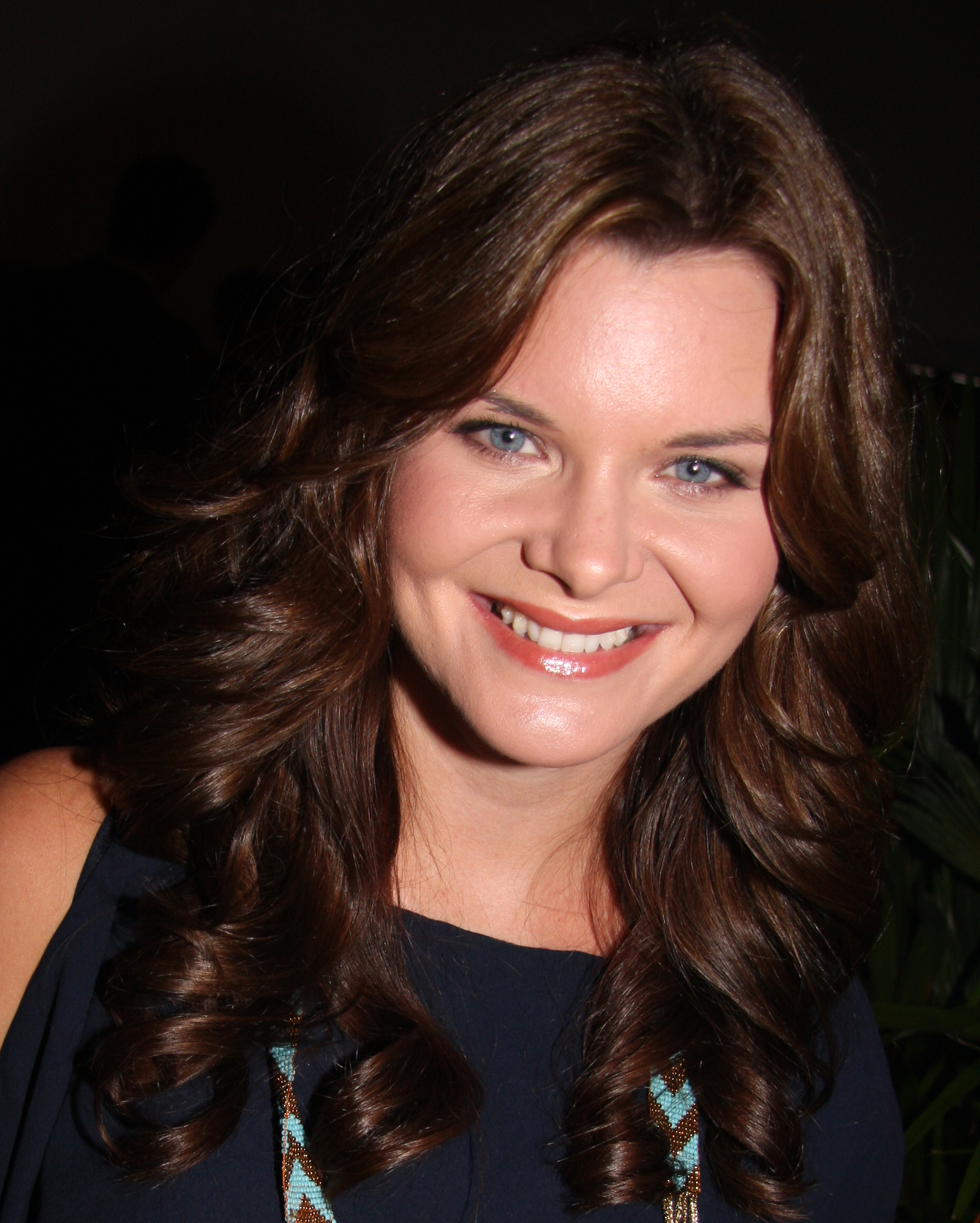
Heather Tom

- Danielle Campbell, actress (Starstruck, Prom, The Originals); native of Hinsdale
- Chris Klein, actor (American Pie I, II, & Reunion; We Were Soldiers); born in Hinsdale
- Heather McNair, actress (Automan)
- Meredith Monroe, actress (Andie McPhee on Dawson's Creek); grew up in Hinsdale
- Morris the Cat, animal actor (9Lives mascot); adopted from the Hinsdale Humane Society
- David Tom, actor (Stay Tuned, Swing Kids, The Young and the Restless); born in Hinsdale
- Heather Tom, actress (The Young and the Restless, The Bold and the Beautiful, One Life to Live); born in Hinsdale
- Nicholle Tom, actress (Maggie Sheffield on The Nanny); born in Hinsdale

== Arts and culture ==
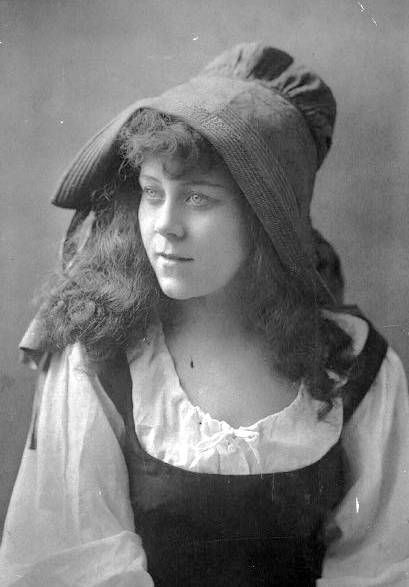
Loie Fuller

- Tomi Adeyemi, novelist of fantasy series Legacy of Orïsha; raised in Hinsdale
- David Bohnett, technology pioneer, philanthropist, LGBT activist
- Mike Donovan, musician, raised in Hinsdale
- Loie Fuller, dancer
- Bill Gothard, Christian author and founder of Institute in Basic Life Principles (the organization's former headquarters was located in Hinsdale until after his removal)
- Rob Johnson, CBS-2 newscaster
- Floyd Kalber, newscaster
- Taylor Mason, comedian
- Joseph Nechvatal, visual artist
- Pete Nelson, host of Animal Planet show Treehouse Masters
- Giuliana Rancic, host for E! News; reality TV personality (Giuliana & Bill)
- Bill Rancic, entrepreneur; reality TV personality (Giuliana & Bill; The Apprentice)
- Dizzy Reed, keyboardist for Guns N' Roses
- Allison Rosati, NBC-5 newscaster
- Rob Stafford, NBC-5 newscaster, lived in Hinsdale
- R. Harold Zook, architect

== Business ==
- Bob Dudley, group CEO of BP

== Politics and law ==
- Valdas Adamkus, regional administrator of United States Environmental Protection Agency and president of Lithuania (1998–2003, 2004–2009)
- Judy Biggert, United States congresswoman for Illinois's 13th congressional district (from 1999 to 2013)
- Robert William Dean, United States diplomat
- Kirk W. Dillard, candidate for governor of Illinois (2010)
- Goudyloch E. Dyer, Illinois state representative
- Pat Quinn, 41st governor of Illinois
- Jason Van Dyke, former Chicago police officer and convicted murderer
- Diane Wood, judge on the 7th Circuit Court of Appeals and professor at the University of Chicago Law School

== Military ==
- Wilson Bryant Burtt, U.S. military officer

== Sports ==
=== Baseball ===
- Joe Benson, outfielder who is currently a free agent; born in Hinsdale
- Chuck Comiskey, co-owner of the Chicago White Sox; owned a taxi company in Hinsdale
- Ryan Fitzgerald infielder; born in Hinsdale
- Bobby Thigpen, former Chicago White Sox pitcher; lived in Hinsdale
- Jim Thome, first baseman and designated hitter for six MLB teams; five-time All-Star; current special assistant to General Manager Rick Hahn of the Chicago White Sox; lived in Hinsdale
- Todd Van Poppel, pitcher for six MLB teams; born in Hinsdale
- Bill Veeck, baseball executive and franchise owner with MLB; grew up in Hinsdale

=== Basketball ===
- Matas Buzelis, professional basketball player for the Chicago Bulls, 11th pick in the 2024 NBA draft; born in Chicago, raised in Hinsdale
- Kathleen Doyle, basketball player at the University of Iowa (2016–2020); Big Ten Player of the Year in 2020; silver medalist with the US national team at the 2019 Pan American Games; WNBA draftee as 14th overall pick by Indiana Fever; born in Hinsdale

=== Football ===
- Brian Allen, offensive guard for the Los Angeles Rams; born and raised in Hinsdale
- Jack Allen, center for the New Orleans Saints; born and raised in Hinsdale
- Kiran Amegadjie, offensive tackle for the Chicago Bears; born and raised in Hinsdale
- Jay Berwanger, first winner of the Heisman Trophy and first person chosen in the NFL draft; lived in Hinsdale many years
- Chuck Bradley, football player
- Kevin Kasper, wide receiver for nine NFL teams; Super Bowl champion (XXXIX); born in Hinsdale
- John Lynch, strong safety for the Tampa Bay Buccaneers, Denver Broncos, and New England Patriots; Super Bowl champion (XXXVII); born in Hinsdale
- Tom Rouen, punter for six NFL teams; born in Hinsdale
- Matt Sherry, tight end for the Cincinnati Bengals; born in Hinsdale

=== Hockey ===
- Éric Dazé, former left wing for the Chicago Blackhawks; lives in Hinsdale
- Steve Konroyd, defenseman for six NHL teams; announcer for Comcast Sports; lived in Hinsdale
- Martin Lapointe, right wing for the Detroit Red Wings, Boston Bruins, Chicago Blackhawks, and Ottawa Senators; two-time winner of the Stanley Cup (1997–1998); lived in Hinsdale
- Josh Manson, defenseman for the Colorado Avalanche; born in Hinsdale
- Gabe Perreault, forward for the New York Rangers; raised in Hinsdale
- Joel Quenneville, former head coach of the Chicago Blackhawks who was fired after allegations
- Brent Sopel, defenseman in the Kontinental Hockey League (KHL); lives in Hinsdale

=== Olympic sports ===
- Frank Foss, pole vaulter; Olympic gold medalist (1920); lived and died in Hinsdale
- John Kinsella, swimmer; Olympic gold medalist in 4 x 200 metre freestyle relay (1972)
- Edwin Myers, pole vaulter; Olympic bronze medalist (1920); born in Hinsdale
- Courtney Zablocki, Olympic luger

=== Soccer ===
- Andrew Gutman, left-back
- Matt Pyzdrowski, goalkeeper for the Chicago Fire Premier, Portland Timbers and Ängelholms FF (Sweden)

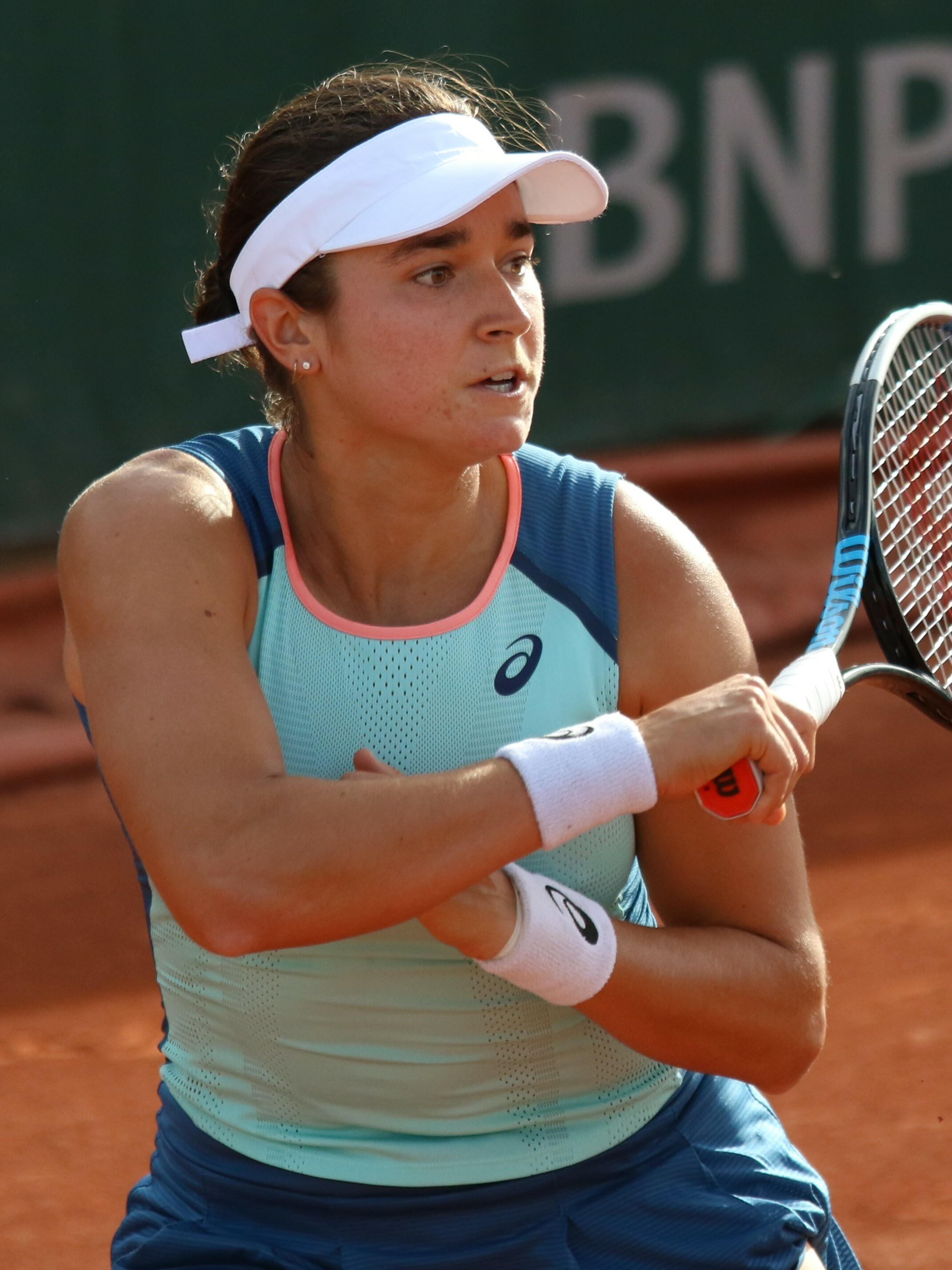
Caroline Dolehide

=== Sports management ===
- Mike Bohn, athletic director, currently for the University of Southern California
- James Delany, commissioner of the Big Ten Conference

=== Tennis ===
- Caroline Dolehide, tennis player; born in Hinsdale
- Todd Martin, tennis player; born in Hinsdale
- Marty Riessen, tennis player; born in Hinsdale
