= Women in the Shadows =

Women In The Shadows
- First edition cover
- Author: Ann Bannon
- Language: English
- Series: The Beebo Brinker Chronicles
- Genre: Lesbian pulp fiction
- Publisher: Gold Medal Books
- Publication date: 1959
- Publication place: United States
- Media type: Print (paperback)
- ISBN: 1-57344-149-X (2002 edition)
- OCLC: 1502288 (2002 edition)
- Dewey Decimal: 813/.54 22
- LC Class: PS3552.A495 W66 2002
- Preceded by: I Am a Woman
- Followed by: Journey to a Woman

Women In The Shadows
- Cleis Press edition cover
- Author: Ann Bannon
- Language: English
- Publisher: Cleis Press
- Publication date: 2002
- Publication place: United States
- Media type: Print (paperback)

Women in the Shadows is a lesbian pulp fiction novel written in 1959 by Ann Bannon (pseudonym of Ann Weldy). It is the third in a series of pulp fiction novels that eventually came to be known as The Beebo Brinker Chronicles. It was originally published in 1959 by Gold Medal Books, again in 1983 by Naiad Press, and again in 2002 by Cleis Press. Each edition was adorned with a different cover.

This book proved to be Bannon's most controversial and unpopular of the series, blurring lines between heroes and villains, especially on the tail of the triumphant and groundbreaking end of I Am a Woman. Bannon stated that the subject matter paralleled Bannon's own frustrations in her marriage. The content also focused on then-whispered of topics such as interracial relationships, domestic violence, and self-loathing in matters of race and sexuality.

As Bannon explained in the 2001 edition forward of the first book in the series, Odd Girl Out, Gold Medal Books publishers had control over the cover art and the title. Bannon's publisher titled the book. Lesbian pulp fiction books usually showed suggestive art with obscure titles that hinted at what the subject matter was inside.

== Plot summary ==
Laura Landon has been living with her lover, a tough and strikingly handsome butch named Beebo Brinker, for two years. Their relationship has deteriorated and both are frustrated, even after a party for their anniversary where Beebo remarks that hardly any couples make it together for as long as they have. The chapters begin with Laura's diary entries asking herself why they all drink and fall into relationships they know will be ruined. Their mutual friend, Jack Mann, watches as Beebo descends into alcoholism and Laura becomes interested in another woman.

Tris Robischon, an East Indian dancer, is exotic to Laura, with a fascinating accent and story. Soon Laura begins taking lessons from her. Jack, disheartened once more after Terry, his boyfriend, has left him, begins to try to convince Laura to marry him, to which she responds in consternation since both are gay. Laura returns home from visiting Tris to discover Beebo's dog brutally killed and Beebo bruised and battered from being raped, Beebo claims, by some hoodlums who found out she was a woman. Laura tends to Beebo for weeks after, but knows her heart is not in it.

Laura's lessons with Tris turn more intimate as Beebo refuses to go to work and drinks constantly instead. Fueled by boredom and alcohol, Beebo becomes controlling and suspicious of Laura, and when Tris visits unexpectedly, Beebo assaults Tris and later hits Laura in a rage, after which Laura leaves her. Laura goes to Jack, not knowing where else to turn. Jack proposes an atypical marriage to her: they would live together and perhaps have children, but they would never sleep together, and both could have their affairs if they wanted, but quietly.

Tris finds herself attracted to Laura but is confused, not sure what to do with her emotions. She takes Laura to a beach house for two weeks where Tris flirts with men and with Laura simultaneously. Not knowing what to do with her attraction to Laura, Tris relents to her advances, but does not enjoy it, and Laura is ashamed of their encounter. Laura returns to Jack, telling him also that Tris is married and is black and has been hiding both. Hearing about Beebo's further deterioration, Laura finally agrees to marry Jack.

Laura and Jack get married at City Hall and begin a most unusual relationship. Laura has grave misgivings, but through time both of them get used to it until Terry comes back and Laura feels pulled by the Village once more. When Laura goes looking for Beebo again, she learns how badly Beebo actually descended — Beebo killed her own dog and lied about the rape to Laura — to keep her longer, and when Laura left, Beebo attempted suicide. Terry's return causes Jack to return to alcohol.

Laura finds Beebo again, who admits she has changed, unable to live in such a destructive way. They live together briefly, but their passion is no longer there. When Laura returns to Jack, they discover that a previous trip to get her artificially inseminated has worked, and she is pregnant.
