= House Select Committee on Current Pornographic Materials =

US government committee

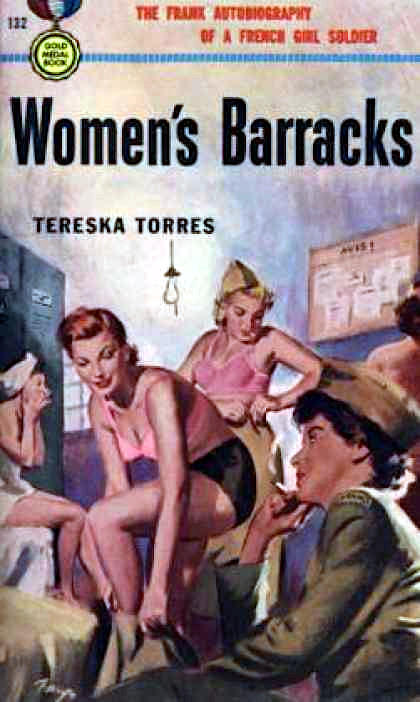
1950 cover by Barye Phillips

The House Select Committee on Current Pornographic Materials, commonly known as the Gathings Committee, was a select committee of the United States House of Representatives which was active in 1952 and 1953. Representative Ezekiel C. Gathings, Democrat from Arkansas, was its chairman, appointed by Speaker of the House Sam Rayburn. H. Ralph Burton was the committee's general counsel.

Representative Gathings was troubled by the contents of the pulp literature, paperback books and comic books he saw on local newsstands, in particular Tereska Torres' 1950 bestseller Women's Barracks and its cover, worried that they would stimulate young people to commit rape. The committee formed in reaction to the book's popularity and used it as an example of how paperback books "promoted moral degeneracy". Gathings launched a Congressional investigation into the paperback book industry, becoming so zealous that he earned the mockery of some journalists. In addition to Women's Barracks, other books investigated by the committee were The Tormented, Spring Fire, Unmoral, Forbidden, Artist's Model, and The Wayward Bus.

The Committee began its investigation in 1952 and issued its report in 1953. The report alleged that 100 million obscene comic books were sold in the United States each month, that one in ten American men read girlie magazines, and that these were problems calling for censorship on the Federal level. The chief result of the report was to turn Gathings into a laughing stock.

Torres' book was not banned nationwide in the US because the publisher, Fawcett Gold Medal, agreed to add a narrator who commented disapprovingly on the characters' behavior so as to "teach moral lessons" about the "problem" of lesbianism. The publicity from the government investigation prompted the book's second edition.
