= I Am a Woman =

1959 book by Ann Bannon

I Am a Woman (In Love With A Woman — Must Society Reject Me?)
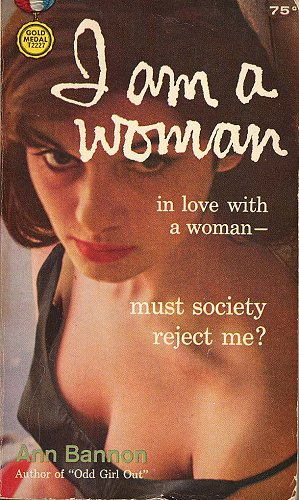
- First edition cover
- Author: Ann Bannon
- Language: English
- Series: The Beebo Brinker Chronicles
- Genre: Lesbian pulp fiction
- Publisher: Fawcett Gold Medal Books
- Publication date: 1959
- Publication place: United States
- Media type: Print (Paperback)
- Preceded by: Odd Girl Out
- Followed by: Women in the Shadows

I Am a Woman is a lesbian pulp fiction novel written in 1959 by Ann Bannon (pseudonym of Ann Weldy). It is the second in a series of pulp fiction novels that eventually came to be known as The Beebo Brinker Chronicles. It was originally published in 1959 by Gold Medal Books, again in 1983 by Naiad Press, and again in 2002 by Cleis Press.

Its original title with Gold Medal Books was I Am a Woman In Love With A Woman Must Society Reject Me? Bannon wanted the title to be Strangers in this World(from a conversation the main character has with a stranger who tells her that everyone is a stranger until she finds someone to love), but as Bannon explained in the 2001 edition forward of Odd Girl Out, Gold Medal publishers had control over the cover art and the title. Bannon's editor titled the book. Lesbian pulp fiction books usually showed suggestive art with obscure titles that hinted at what the subject matter was inside. For the 1983 and 2002 editions, the title was shorted to I Am A Woman. It is followed in the series by Women In The Shadows, also published in 1959.

Bannon was inspired to write after reading The Well of Loneliness and Spring Fire. However, it was in this book that Bannon wrote one of the first endings in a work of lesbian fiction where none of the characters commit suicide, goes insane, is killed, or is left completely alone. In an interview in 2003, she reluctantly admitted this was her favorite of the series.

== Plot summary ==
One year after leaving college, Laura Landon is exhausted by living with her harsh, judgmental father, who perceives that she failed out of school. Laura leaves home in the middle of the night and goes to New York City. She gets a job as a secretary in a medical office and lands an apartment in Greenwich Village with a roommate named Marcie. Marcie, while young and very impulsive, is vivacious and puts Laura at ease. Laura moves into the apartment with a vague gnawing excitement in her.

Laura and Marcie develop a routine, and Laura gets a handle on her new job. Marcie is constantly fighting with her ex-husband Burr, who comes around frequently to date Marcie, and in between fights they sleep together. Finding that Laura tempers Marcie a bit, she insists that she will only date Burr if Laura is with her — which confounds Laura as she recognizes that she is attracted to Marcie and intensely dislikes Burr. Burr brings along a friend, Jack Mann, and they double date one evening. As a joke, he explains, Jack takes them to a gay bar in Greenwich Village and watches their reactions. Jack is an alcoholic but is good-natured and has a self-deprecating sense of humor. Laura is intrigued by Jack, and his friends laugh at him.

Jack returns the intrigue when he hears Laura argue with Burr's statement that he could make any of the women in the bar straight if he wanted to. Jack asks her out again and shocks her when he tells Laura he knows she's in love with Marcie. Jack admits he's also gay and helps Laura deal with the realization about herself. She also confides to him that her father hates her because her mother and brother drowned and her father could not save them.

After going out a couple times, Jack introduces Laura to a mutual friend, Beebo Brinker (born as Betty Jean), a tall, swaggering, dark-haired butch. They meet later in the gay bar after Laura runs away from Marcie, unable to contain her attraction. After a few drinks, Laura is afraid to return home, so Beebo allows her to sleep on her sofa. From a desperate longing and loneliness, Laura sobers up enough to seduce Beebo and they begin a torrid affair. Laura tells Beebo about Marcie, and Beebo warns Laura that Marcie knows Laura is in love with her and is playing with her. Laura refuses to believe it.

Laura attempts to contact her father when he travels to town for a journalists' convention, only to be rebuked. Marcie finally stops speaking to Burr and Burr, frustrated, calls Laura at work and accuses her of being in love with Marcie and keeping her from seeing him. Laura begins to spy on her father and unravel under the strain of her relationship with Marcie. She depends on Jack, who is in a new relationship with a young man, but who expresses his sincere doubt that it will last. After getting drunk and humiliating Beebo in a bar, she's left alone.

Exhausted, Laura finally tells Marcie she's in love with her. Marcie, deeply moved by Laura's sincerity and intensity, admits that it was a game for her after all, but will try to return Laura's love. Heartbroken and ashamed, Laura leaves the apartment to confront her father at his hotel. They have a violent fight, and Laura hits him over the head with an ashtray and runs.

After wandering the night in the rain, Laura shows up at Jack's house fearing she killed her father. Jack and his new boyfriend take care of her. Laura shows up to apologize to Beebo and tells her she loves her. In an ending that was completely different from any previous work of lesbian fiction, they walk together to Beebo's apartment arm in arm.

== Reception ==
Although pulp novels were not reviewed by serious literary journals, The Ladder in 1959 gave it a very favorable review, claiming, "the book is very realistic, the writing is excellent for a paperback, and the ending is so very happy that it sets the book almost in a class by itself. The author is sympathetic herself, but she pulls no punches. She definitely realizes the drawbacks as well as the advantages."

In 1959, ONE, Inc. reviewed I Am A Woman, giving it mixed reviews for the descriptions of the sex scenes and Marcie's "unbelievable" personality, but being especially impressed with Jack and Terry, the happy ending, and the fact that the book was written for homosexuals, as opposed to entertainment for heterosexuals which was much more common. The review read, "It is indeed heartening to read a happy ending in this era of suicidal finishes; and this is a complete happy ending...and works out quite logically. I Am A Woman is a book that basically all homosexual readers, both men and women, will enjoy reading."

A 1969 retrospective of lesbian paperback fiction called I Am A Woman a "blockbuster" that heaps praise on the character of Beebo Brinker, "who carries off a barroom seduction scene that is surely a classic".

Chapter 8 of I Am A Woman was included in a compilation of excerpts from what author-editor Katherine V. Forrest considered the best examples of lesbian pulp fiction books, aptly named Lesbian Pulp Fiction in 2005.

In the 1983 Joy Parks, author of the article "Pulps of Passion," read an array of pulp fictions novels by Ann Bannon and wrote review of them for the July/August issue of Body Politic. In this review she stated that I Am A Woman, along with Bannon's other novels, "proved that while love between women was difficult, it was a possibility." She also hailed Bannon's work as "lesbian classic."
