= Animal hoarding =

Keeping more domestic pets than can be cared for

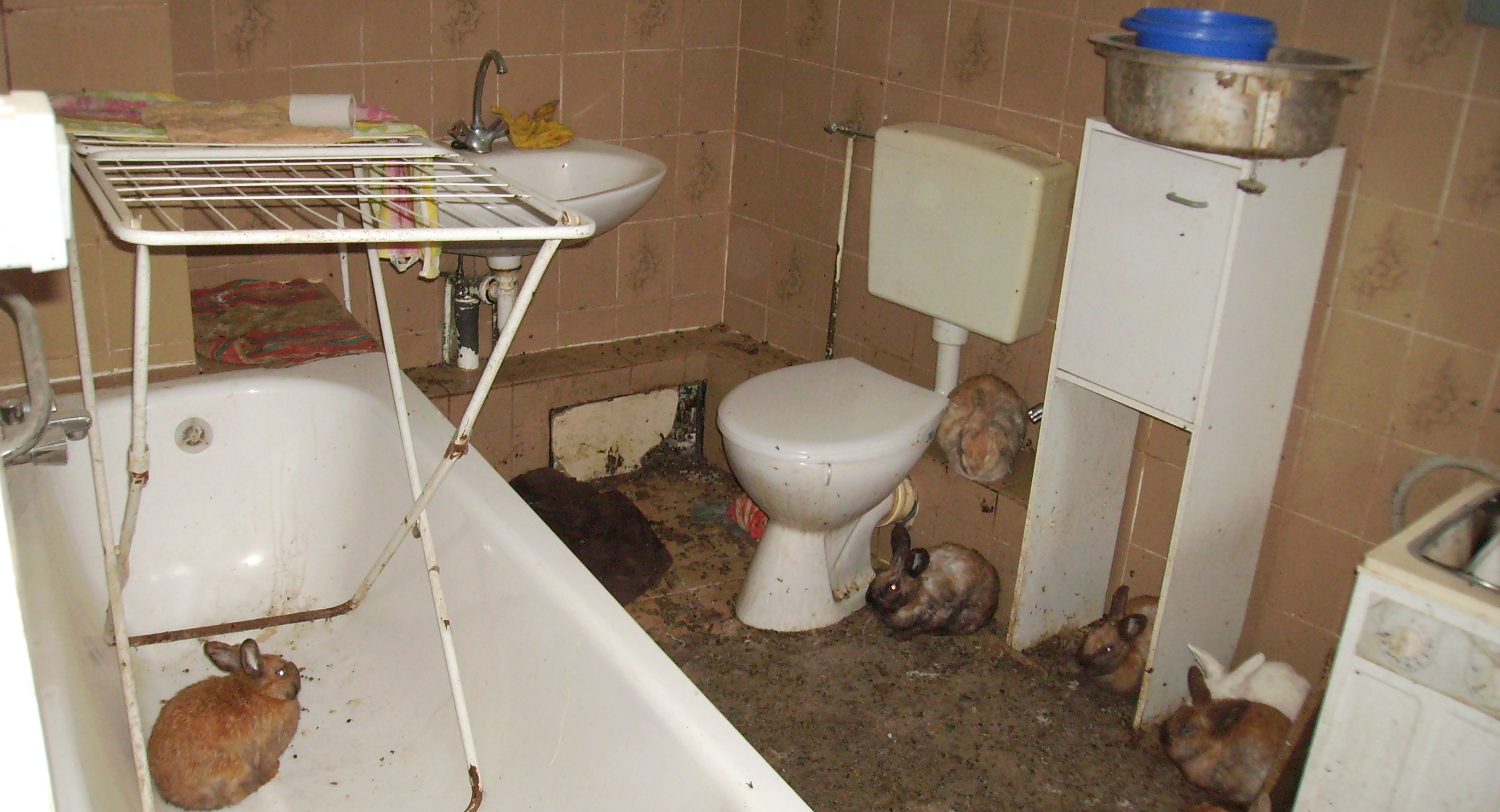
Animal hoarding of rabbits

Animal hoarding, sometimes called Noah syndrome, is keeping a higher-than-usual number of animals as domestic pets without the ability to properly house or care for them, while at the same time denying this inability. Compulsive hoarding can be characterized as a symptom of a mental disorder rather than deliberate cruelty towards animals. Hoarders are deeply attached to their pets and find it extremely difficult to let the pets go. They typically cannot comprehend that they are harming their pets by failing to provide them with proper care. Hoarders tend to believe that they provide the right amount of care for them. The American Society for the Prevention of Cruelty to Animals provides a "Hoarding Prevention Team", which works with hoarders to help them attain a manageable and healthy number of pets.

== Characteristics of a hoarder ==
An animal hoarder keeps an unusually large number of pets for their premises, and fails to care for them properly. A hoarder is distinguished from an animal breeder, who would have numerous animals as the central component of their business; this distinction can be problematic, however, as some hoarders are former breeders who have ceased selling and caring for their animals, while others will claim to be breeders as a psychological defense mechanism, or in hopes of forestalling intervention. Gary Patronek, director of the Center for Animals and Public Policy at Tufts University, defines hoarding as the "pathological human behavior that involves a compulsive need to obtain and control animals, coupled with a failure to recognize their suffering". According to another study, the distinguishing feature is that a hoarder "fails to provide the animals with adequate food, water, sanitation, and veterinary care, and... is in denial about this inability to provide adequate care." Along with other compulsive hoarding behaviors, it is linked in the DSM-IV to obsessive–compulsive disorder and obsessive–compulsive personality disorder. The DSM-5 includes a diagnosis of hoarding disorder.

Alternatively, animal hoarding could be related to addiction, dementia, or even focal delusion.

The number of animals involved alone is not a determinative factor in identifying hoarding. Instead, the issue is the owner's inability to provide care for the animals and the owner's refusal to acknowledge that both the animals and the household are deteriorating. For instance, in one animal hoarding case, 11 cats were seized from a trailer. The deputy police officer testified that the trailer smelled so strongly of feline waste that despite experiencing severe congestion at the time of the investigation, she had a hard time staying in there for more than a few minutes. The deputy further testified that she could not step anywhere in the trailer without stepping on fresh, old, or smeared fecal matter, and that even the stove and sink were filled with bio-hazardous waste. Yet, a Canadian woman, who died leaving 100 properly fed, spayed/neutered, vaccinated, and groomed cats, was not considered an animal hoarder because her animals were properly cared for.

The Hoarding of Animals Research Consortium (HARC) identifies the following characteristics as common to all hoarders:

- Accumulation of numerous animals, which has overwhelmed that person's ability to provide even minimal standards of nutrition, sanitation, and veterinary care;
- Failure to acknowledge the deteriorating condition of the animals (including disease, starvation, and even death) and the household environment (severe overcrowding, very unsanitary conditions); and
- Failure to recognize the negative effect of the collection on their own health and well-being, and on that of other household members.

Compulsive hoarding can be characterized as a symptom of mental disorder rather than deliberate cruelty towards animals. Hoarders are deeply attached to their pets and find it extremely difficult to let the pets go. They typically cannot comprehend that they are harming their pets by failing to provide them with proper care. Hoarders tend to believe that they provide the right amount of care for their pets.

== Legal solutions ==
=== United States ===
==== Animal cruelty statutes ====
In the United States, animal hoarders can be prosecuted under state animal cruelty laws for failing to provide a certain level of care to their animals. The following provides some examples of the standards currently in effect. In Alaska, the cruelty statute defines a minimum standard of care for animals that includes (1) food and water sufficient to maintain each animal in good health; (2) an environment compatible with protecting and maintaining the good health and safety of the animal; and (3) reasonable medical care at times and to the extent available and necessary to maintain the animal in good health. Likewise, in Colorado, a person commits cruelty to animals if he or she knowingly, recklessly, or with criminal negligence deprives an animal of necessary sustenance, neglects any animal, allows the animal to be housed in a manner that results in chronic or repeated serious physical harm, or fails to provide the animal with proper food, drink, or protection from the weather consistent with the species, breed, and type of animal involved. In Colorado's animal cruelty statute, "neglect" means failure to provide food, water, protection from the elements, or other care generally considered to be normal, usual, and accepted for an animal's health and well-being consistent with the species, breed, and type of animal.

Since failure to provide proper care for animals is an act of omission or neglect rather than an affirmative act, the failure to care for an animal is considered a misdemeanor offense in most states. For instance, in Alaska, if an animal owner fails to provide the aforementioned standards of care, the state has prima facie evidence of a failure to care for an animal. If the prosecutor can prove the owner's failure to care for an animal was done with criminal negligence and the failure to care for the animal caused its death or severe physical pain or prolonged suffering, then the owner may be guilty of a Class A misdemeanor. In Colorado, failure to provide an animal with the proper standard of care is a Class 1 misdemeanor. In Virginia, each owner must provide for each of his companion animals: adequate feed; adequate water; adequate shelter that is properly cleaned; adequate space in the primary enclosure for the particular type of animal depending upon its age, size, species, and weight; adequate exercise; adequate care, treatment, and transportation; and veterinary care when needed to prevent suffering or disease transmission. Violation of these standards is a Class 4 misdemeanor. A second or subsequent violation may result in a higher grade misdemeanor. Likewise, under Virginia's animal cruelty statute, any person who deprives any animal of necessary food, drink, shelter or emergency veterinary treatment is guilty of a Class 1 misdemeanor.

However, some states, like California and New Hampshire, may provide felony provisions for depriving an animal of necessary sustenance, drink, and shelter. In Colorado, it is a class 6 felony upon a second or subsequent conviction of animal cruelty. In Maine, a person who is guilty of cruelty to animals may face criminal or civil charges at the discretion of the state's attorney.

==== Penalties under state animal cruelty statutes ====
Penalties for failing to provide proper care or medical care to animals under state animal cruelty statutes can include fines, animal forfeiture, the cost of care for the seized animals, and jail time. Since animal hoarding is sometimes associated with mental illness, a situation may arise when an alleged animal neglecter is found incompetent to stand trial due to a mental disability and thus remains the rightful owner of the animals he or she has neglected (i.e. the animals were not forfeited). In the Matter of a Protective Order for Jean Marie Primrose, for example, after a tip from a veterinarian, police confiscated 11 cats from a woman's feces and urine covered, rat infested trailer in Oregon; the cats were then placed in the care of a rescue organization. The woman was charged with criminal second degree animal neglect. After being diagnosed with a mild case of mental retardation, however, the judge found the woman unable to aid and assist in her own defense. The second degree charge was thereby dismissed. Since the woman was not convicted of a crime, her rights to the 11 cats were not forfeited. Yet, from the time the cats were seized to the time of the dismissal, the rescue organization accrued more than $30,000 in cat care fees.

The rescue organization placed a lien on the cats, meaning the woman could not get her cats back until she paid off her debt. After the dismissal of the case, however, the woman never made any attempt to contact the rescue organization about returning her cats. The fate of the cats therefore remained in limbo. The rescue organization could have either kept the cats and kept accruing care fees because not being rightful owners, they could not place the cats into homes, or forgiven the debt and returned the cats to the woman. Since the rescue organization felt the woman was incapable of adequately caring for the cats and since the organization did not want to invest more money that would likely remain uncompensated, the organization filed a petition for a limited protective order as a fiduciary for the care and placement of the cats. The probate court ruled against the organization, but the appeals court overturned the lower court's order and held that the probate court did indeed have authority to enter a limited protective order under ORS 125.650 as a "fiduciary necessary to implement a protective order." The probate court, then, granted the limited protective order and the organization was allowed to place the cats into new homes. This case was considered a landmark by the Animal Legal Defense Fund.

In addition to jail time, animal forfeiture, and fines, a state, such as California, may allow courts to order psychological counseling at the court's discretion or may require the defendant to undergo anger management, such as the case in Colorado. Prosecutors may also be able to request bans on future pet ownership or request limits on the number of animals a convicted hoarder may keep. For instance, in ALDF v. Conyers, over one hundred dogs and nine birds were confiscated from the defendants' home. About 70 of those dogs had severe oral disease, disintegrating jaws, and scarred corneas. One dog, who was caged in the basement, could barely stand up and kept soiling himself, which lead to his skin being scalded from the urine and feces. An officer also noticed the dog's tongue hanging out of his mouth, but later learned that his tongue was sticking out because his jaw had disintegrated. The Animal Legal Defense Fund moved for a permanent injunction to enjoin the defendants from owning animals from the date of the court's final judgment to 10 years.

==== Criticism of applying animal cruelty laws to hoarding ====
Although animal hoarders can be prosecuted under state animal cruelty laws, many scholars maintain that basic animal cruelty laws are inefficient in prosecuting hoarders. As Stephan Otto, director of legislative affairs for the Animal Legal Defense Fund explains: "Only a handful of states allow felony charges for the worst kinds of animal neglect ... They also need stronger laws that take into account when multiple numbers of animals were in involved in a case." HARC's research on 56 animal hoarding cases illustrates Otto's point:

In sixteen cases, individuals were charged with one count of animal cruelty for their entire group of animals rather than one count of cruelty for each animal involved. In several other cases, hoarders were only charged with one count of failure to license or provide a rabies vaccination when there were dozens of animals involved.

Prosecutors and judges, however, discourage multiple charges, believing that they "clog" the system. The difficulty of proving each charge also accounts for this discouragement. In order to bring one charge of cruelty for each animal, prosecutors and animal agencies must provide proof of cruelty to each animal, matching each animal with its count number. Charging the hoarder with only one count reduces the burdens on the system, the prosecutors, and the animal agencies, but undermines the severity of the charges.

==== Hoarding-specific laws ====
Only two states have laws regarding the hoarding of animals: Illinois and Hawaii.

Passed in 2001, the Illinois Humane Care for Animals Act was amended to include a definition a companion animal hoarder and mandated psychological counseling for animal hoarders who violate Section 3. A person convicted of violating section 3 of the Act (which requires the provision of food and water, adequate shelter and protection from the weather, veterinary care, and humane care and treatment) is guilty of a misdemeanor with a second or subsequent violation raising the offense to a Class 4 felony. One commentator, Victoria Hayes, JD, believed that although Illinois' legal definition of a "companion animal hoarder" is a step in the right direction, the definition does not provide any extra tools to a prosecutor. Animal hoarding itself is not prohibited by the statute, she said, and the prosecutor must still show a violation of Section 3 of the Humane Care for Animals Act. Animal hoarding itself is not prohibited by the Illinois statute.

Hawaii, on the other hand, specifically outlaws animal hoarding. In 2008, animal hoarding became a misdemeanor offense. Hawaii's Penal Code now provides:

(1) A person commits the offense of animal hoarding if the person intentionally, knowingly, or recklessly;

- (a) Possesses more than fifteen dogs, cats, or a combination of dogs and cats;
- (b) Fails to provide necessary sustenance for each dog or cat; and
- (c) Fails to correct the conditions under which the dogs or cats are living, where conditions injurious to the dogs', cats', or owner's health and well-being result from the person's failure to provide necessary sustenance.

(2) Animal hoarding is a misdemeanor.

Hawaii's law specifically criminalizes hoarding, while depriving an animal of necessary sustenance can also constitute a separate offense of animal cruelty. The hoarding law differs from ordinances that limit the number of pets a person can have because it only prohibits keeping more than fifteen dogs and cats if the owner fails to provide necessary care for the animals and that failure causes injury to the animals or the owner.

An important aspect of the law is that prosecutors may be able to charge hoarders with one count of animal hoarding that covers all of the animals. When hoarding is prosecuted under state animal cruelty laws, prosecutors must charge hoarders with multiple counts of animal cruelty—one for each animal on the premises. By creating the offense of "hoarding", Hawaii's law seems to allow prosecutors to charge hoarders with one count of animal hoarding that covers every animal the person has hoarded, easing the prosecution's burden of providing documentation of each individual animal's injury. This will also decrease the cumbersome burden multiple charges can place on courts. Prosecutors will also be able to bring separate charges of animal cruelty for individual animals whose injuries are easiest to document.

Hawaii's statute does not mandate psychological counseling for convicted hoarders or restrict future animal ownership.

Anti-hoarding legislation has been proposed, but not passed, in several other states.

==== Hoarding-specific municipal ordinances ====
While a state may not have an animal hoarding specific statute, its municipalities may have animal hoarding specific ordinances. For instance, the city of Alto, Georgia's ordinance specifically prohibits hoarders. The ordinance defines a hoarder as a person or entity that:

(a) Collects animals and fails to provide them with humane/adequate care;

(b) Collects dead animals that are not properly disposed of as required by this article; or

(c) Collects, houses, or harbors animals in filthy, unsanitary conditions that constitute a health hazard to the animals being kept, and/or to the animals or residents of adjacent property.

If a person is convicted of being a hoarder under this ordinance, that person may not own, possess, or have on his premises in Alto any animal for one year from the date of conviction. The person may also be punished by a fine not to exceed $1,000.00 and/or by imprisonment in the common jail of the town not to exceed six months.

The Animal Law Coalition has a Model Animal Hoarding Specific Ordinance (available under "Resources" at its website) that can be adapted by various communities.

More controversially, a municipality may limit the number of pets a person is allowed to keep in his or her home in hopes of preventing animal hoarding. These are called pet limitation ordinances. Gary J. Patronek, in The Problem of Animal Hoarding, Municipal Lawyer 6 (2001), stated that pet limitation ordinances are "wildly unpopular, difficult to enforce, and likely to be opposed by a broad coalition of pet fanciers, breeders, rescue groups, and animal protection organizations." While a hoarding specific ordinance, like Alto, prohibits keeping numerous animals in conditions that are harmful to the animals' health, pet limitation ordinances simply prohibit keeping more than a certain number of animals regardless of the level of care provided to the animals. As mentioned previously in this article, the number of animals involved alone is not a determinative factor in identifying hoarding and it is possible for a person to successfully care for a large number of animals. Examples of pet limitation ordinances include: Aurora, Colorado and Banks County, Georgia. In Banks County, Georgia, the number of dogs a person can own differs based on the zone in which the person's property is located.

Some pet limitation ordinances, however, provide exemptions to the pet restrictions. For instance, in Great Falls, Montana, a person who owns or harbors any more than the number of dogs and cats permitted by the ordinance for a period of more than thirty (30) days must obtain a multiple animal permit. Additionally, a breeder can be exempt from the ordinance by obtaining a Multiple Animal Hobby Breeder Permit. These exemptions are, no doubt, provided to lessen the opposition and problems of pet limitation ordinances.

==== Problems with prosecuting hoarders ====
Prosecuting animal hoarding cases is "complex, time consuming, and costly; as made evident in the Primrose case, the high cost of caring for animals rescued from hoarders, who often must be cared for at the rescuer's expense, is a huge disincentive for prosecuting these types of cases. Especially since the animal rescue operation may never be compensated for its expenses. Further, as Dr. Gary Patronek explains, "[p]rosecutors don't really have the tools they need to fully go after these cases ... and they often don't have the support of other agencies that they need." This lack of communication among various governmental agencies, such as code enforcement, the health department, and animal control, impedes the detection of animal hoarders and thereby the prosecution of hoarders. Further, since animal hoarding cases do not get widespread attention, they do not garner community support, which is also a disincentive for prosecution. Additionally, officials may opt to forgo charges or enter into lenient plea-bargains in exchange for custody of the animals because they fear that the animals will languish in shelters while prosecution is pending. These attempts to "strike a balance between helping both the hoarder and the animals involved" are generally ineffective because of high recidivism rates among hoarders.

When hoarders are prosecuted, there is broad inconsistency in the number and severity of charges brought. These inconsistencies may arise because some prosecutors and judges discourage multiple charges, believing that they "clog" the system. The difficulty of proving each charge also accounts for these inconsistencies. In order to bring one charge of cruelty for each animal, prosecutors and animal agencies must provide proof of cruelty to each animal, matching each animal with its count number. Adversely, charging the hoarder with only one count reduces the burdens on the system, the prosecutors, and the animal agencies, but undermines the severity of the charges. Laws that create a separate offense of animal hoarding may solve this problem by allowing one count of hoarding to be brought in every case that encompasses the hoarding aspect of the charge rather than focusing on each individual count of cruelty.

=== United Kingdom ===
In the United Kingdom, there are no direct laws regarding hoarding, and no specific limit on the number of animals a person may keep. However, individuals may be charged under the Animal Welfare Act 2006 for failing to meet their duty of care regarding housing needs.

== Dangers ==
The health issues in animal hoarding encompass a variety of concerns related to both individual and public health. Animal hoarding is the cause of many severe health risks that threaten the hoarded animals, individuals living in hoarding residences, and surrounding neighbors.

=== Health effects on animals ===
Due to the harmful effects on the health of the animals involved, animal hoarding is considered a form of cruelty to animals. Hoarders often fail to provide basic care for their animals, thus resulting in disease and often death. The primary animal health issues involved are malnourishment and problems related to overcrowding and neglect. Consequences of hoarding are long-lasting and continue to affect the animals even after they have been rescued and provided with better care.

==== Malnourishment ====
Lack of sufficient food and water is a common feature of hoarding situations. The immediate consequence of this is starvation and death. One study found at least one dead animal present in over half of examined cases, the leading cause of death being an insufficient food and water supply. Malnourishment also leads to increased susceptibility to disease, and the hoarded animals are often in advanced stages of sickness. Furthermore, when there is a limited food supply, animals may resort to aggressive behavior in competing for available food, killing and sometimes even eating other animals.

==== Overcrowding ====
Overcrowding also leads to acute animal health problems in hoarding situations. The number of animals found in hoarding cases range from dozens to several hundreds, with extreme cases involving over a thousand animals. Animals are confined to houses, apartments, or trailer-homes. In one case, 306 cats were removed from a home, 87 of which were dead. Corpses were found embedded in the chimney and living room furniture. In addition to lack of living space, overcrowding facilitates the spread of diseases among animals. Furthermore, in cases where more than one species is confined to the same living space, animals can pose a danger to one other due to inter-species aggression.

==== Owner neglect ====
Various other health problems arise from hoarders' neglect of the animals and inability to provide basic care for them. Lack of veterinary attention is notable among these. Hoarders, refusing to acknowledge the deteriorating health conditions of their animals and scared they will be forced to give up custody, often refuse to take their animals to veterinarians. As a result, diseases are left untreated and allowed to become more severe. Another problem tied to neglect is poor sanitary conditions for the animals. Basic animal waste management is absent in virtually all animal-hoarding situations, and animals are filthy and often infected with parasites as a result. Furthermore, animals suffer behaviorally from a lack of socialization caused by an absence of normal interaction with other animals.

==== Lasting consequences ====
Many of these health problems continue to cause suffering even after the animals are rescued. Strained animal shelters or humane societies, forced to prioritize when dealing with numerous rescued animals, may be unable to provide immediate treatment to many animals. Furthermore, many of the rescued animals, due to health or behavioral problems, may not be suitable for adoption. Euthanasia, even in cases where the animals are not beyond rehabilitation, is often the only option for rescued animals. The effects of hoarding on the health and socialization of the animals involved are severe and lasting, taking heavy tolls on both their physical and psychological well-being.

=== Health effects on humans ===
Animal hoarding also causes many health problems for the people involved. Hoarders, by definition, fail to correct the deteriorating sanitary conditions of their living spaces, and this gives rise to several health risks for those living in and around hoarding residences. Animal hoarding is at the root of a string of human health problems including poor sanitation, fire hazards, zoonotic diseases, envenomation, and neglect of oneself and one's dependents.

==== Sanitation concerns ====
Poor sanitation practices, a general characteristic of hoarding households, pose health risks to both animals and humans. In typical hoarding residences, animal waste is found coating interior surfaces, including beds, countertops, and cupboards. In one case, floors and other surfaces were found to be covered in a six-inch layer of feces and garbage.

In addition to severe odors which may pose a nuisance to neighbors, animal waste poses serious health risks through both the spread of parasites and the presence of noxious ammonia levels. OSHA, the United States agency regulating air quality standards in work-related environments, has identified an ammonia level of 300 parts per million as life-threatening for humans; in many hoarding cases the atmospheric ammonia level in the housing space approaches this number, requiring the use of protective clothing and breathing apparati during inspections or interventions. In an extreme case, the ammonia level in the hoarder's house was 152 parts per million even after ventilation.

The presence of animal waste also prevents sanitary storage and preparation of food, which puts residents at risk of contracting food-related illnesses and parasites. Insect and rodent infestation can both follow and worsen hoarding conditions, and can potentially spread to the surrounding environment including to nearby buildings. In one case, an elementary school had to be shut down due to a flea infestation that had spread from a nearby dog hoarder residence.

Hoarders are frequently found to collect large numbers of inanimate objects in addition to animals, giving rise to clutter as well. Hoarded objects can include newspapers, trash, clothing, and food; the clutter inhibits normal movement around the house, hampering household maintenance and sanitary food preparation, heightening the risk of accidents, and contributing to the overall level of squalor. A lack of functioning toilets, sinks, electricity, or proper heating (often due to hoarders not paying bills, though poor maintenance may also be a cause) further exacerbates the problem. Fire hazards comprise yet another health issue tied to poor sanitation; the clutter found in many hoarding households prevents workable fire escape plans and serves as possible fuel when located close to heat sources. The risk is amplified when hoarders, due to inoperative heating systems, seek alternate heating methods such as fireplaces, stoves, or kerosene heaters.

==== Zoonotic diseases ====
Another human health issue caused by animal hoarding is the risk of zoonotic diseases. Defined as "human diseases acquired from or transmitted to any other vertebrate animal", zoonotic diseases can often be lethal and in all cases constitute a serious public health concern. Examples of well-known zoonotic diseases include bubonic plague, influenza, and rabies. Common domesticated animals constitute a large portion of animals carrying zoonoses, and as a result, humans involved in animal hoarding situations are at particular risk of contracting disease. Zoonoses that may arise in hoarding situations—through vectors such as dog, cat, or rat bites—include rabies, salmonellosis, catscratch fever, hookworm, and ringworm. One zoonosis of special concern is toxoplasmosis, which can be transmitted to humans through cat feces or badly-prepared meat, and is known to cause severe birth defects or stillbirth in the case of infected pregnant women. The risk of zoonotic diseases is amplified by the possibility of community epidemics.

==== Self-neglect and child/elder abuse ====
The problems of self-neglect and elder and child abuse are also health problems associated with animal hoarding. Self-neglect can be defined as "the inability to provide for oneself the goods or services to meet basic needs", and has been shown to be an "independent risk factor for death". While self-neglect is a condition generally associated with the elderly, animal hoarders of any age can and do experience it. This is demonstrated by the fact that hoarders' lifestyles often match the degenerate sanitary conditions that surround them. Child and elder abuse arise when dependents are living with the hoarder. According to one study, dependents lived with hoarders in over half of the cases. As with his or her animals, the hoarder often fails to provide adequate care for dependents both young and old, who suffer from a lack of basic necessities as well as the health problems caused by unsanitary conditions. In one case, two children of a couple hoarding 58 cats and other animals were forced to repeat kindergarten and first grade because of excessive absence due to respiratory infections. Self-neglect and neglect of dependents make up a major human health concern of animal hoarding.

==== Public health and interdisciplinary response ====
Animal hoarding has been described in veterinary and public health literature as a form of chronic, large-scale neglect that can affect animals, the person who hoards animals, other household members, neighbors, and responders. Cases may involve failure to provide adequate nutrition, sanitation, veterinary care, and housing, while the person may not recognize the deteriorating condition of the animals or the home environment.

Public health concerns may include exposure to accumulated animal waste, high ammonia levels, parasites, zoonotic infections, fire hazards, structural deterioration of housing, and neglect of dependent children, older adults, or people with disabilities. Because these cases can involve both behavioral health and environmental health risks, responses may require coordination among veterinarians, mental health professionals, social services, housing or code-enforcement agencies, animal control officers, law enforcement, and public health officials.

Long-term management can be difficult because animal hoarding cases may involve poor interagency communication, limited follow-up, difficulty enforcing court-ordered counseling or psychological evaluation, and recidivism. Researchers have suggested that earlier identification and long-term monitoring may improve outcomes for both animals and people affected by hoarding cases.

== Mental health issues ==
Evidence suggests that there is "a strong mental health component" in animal hoarding, though it has not been firmly linked to any specific psychological disorder. Models that have been projected to explain animal hoarding include delusional disorder, attachment disorder, obsessive–compulsive disorder, zoophilia, dementia, and addiction. Direct evidence for most is lacking, however.

=== Delusional disorder ===
Animal hoarders display symptoms of delusional disorder in that they have a "belief system out of touch with reality". Virtually all hoarders lack insight into the extent of deterioration in their habitations and on the health of their animals, refusing to acknowledge that anything is wrong. Furthermore, hoarders may believe they have "a special ability to communicate and/or empathize with animals", rejecting any offers of assistance. Delusional disorder is an effective model in that it offers an explanation of hoarders' apparent blindness to the realities of their situations.

=== Attachment disorder ===
Another model that has been suggested to explain animal hoarding is attachment disorder, which is primarily caused by poor parent-child relationships during childhood. It is characterized by an inability to form "close relationships [with other humans] in adulthood". As a result, those with attachment disorder may turn to animals for companionship. Interviews with animal hoarders have revealed that hoarders have often experienced domestic trauma in childhood, which is the basis of the evidence for this model.

=== Obsessive–compulsive disorder ===
Perhaps the strongest psychological model put forward to explain animal hoarding is obsessive–compulsive disorder (OCD). An overwhelming sense of responsibility for something is characteristic of people with OCD, who then take unrealistic measures to fulfill their perceived duty. Animal hoarders often feel a strong sense of responsibility to take care of and protect animals, and their solution—that of acquiring as many animals as they possibly can—is unrealistic. Further, the hoarding of inanimate objects, practiced by a majority of animal hoarders, is a fairly common occurrence in people with OCD. These connections between animal hoarding and obsessive–compulsive disorder suggest that OCD may be a useful model in explaining animal hoarding behavior. However, this theory has also been refuted by some; Dr. Akimitsu Yokoyama theorizes that animal hoarding could be explained using Asperger syndrome.

== Popular culture and fiction ==
- On the Animal Planet reality series Confessions: Animal Hoarding, which premiered in July 2010, the network intervenes with the support of therapists, family members, friends and animal welfare advocates to help the hoarders and their animals.
- In the animated series The Simpsons, the recurring character Crazy Cat Lady Eleanor Abernathy, first seen in the 1998 episode "Girly Edition", is portrayed as a delusional recluse with dozens of cats that she throws at onlookers.
- In Ann Bannon's novel Journey to a Woman, Vega's mother and grandfather own an excessive number of cats and could be considered to be animal hoarders.
- In the webtoon Lookism, there is an arc featuring an animal hoarder who nabbed both Daniel Park and Johan Song's dogs.

== See also ==
- Backyard breeder
- Cat lady
- Compulsive hoarding
- Geriatric medicine
- Monomania
