= Journey to a Woman =

1960 novel by Ann Bannon

- First edition cover
- Author: Ann Bannon
- Language: English
- Series: The Beebo Brinker Chronicles
- Genre: Lesbian pulp fiction
- Publisher: Gold Medal Books
- Publication date: 1960
- Publication place: United States
- Media type: Print (Paperback)
- ISBN: 1-57344-170-8 (2003 edition)
- OCLC: 1504768 (2003 edition)
- Dewey Decimal: 813/.54 22
- LC Class: PS3552.A495 J68 2003
- Preceded by: Women in the Shadows
- Followed by: Beebo Brinker

Journey To A Woman
- Author: Ann Bannon
- Language: English
- Genre: Fiction
- Publisher: Cleis Press
- Publication date: 2003
- Publication place: United States
- Media type: Paperback

Journey to a Woman is a lesbian pulp fiction novel written in 1960 by Ann Bannon (pseudonym of Ann Weldy). It is the fifth in a series of pulp fiction novels that eventually came to be known as The Beebo Brinker Chronicles. It was originally published in 1960 by Gold Medal Books, again in 1983 by Naiad Press, and again in 2003 by Cleis Press. Each edition was adorned with a different cover.

As Bannon explained in the forward of the 2001 edition of Odd Girl Out, Gold Medal Press publishers had control over the cover art and the title of all the books published through them. Bannon's publisher titled the book. Lesbian pulp fiction books usually showed suggestive art with obscure titles that hinted at what the subject matter was inside.

It is preceded by Women in the Shadows and followed by Beebo Brinker chronologically, although in the course of events of the characters, this is the last in the series. Beebo Brinker, in the course of events, was written last but is set first.

== Plot summary ==
Beth Ayers is stifled and bored by her role as California housewife. Her husband, a successful businessman named Charlie, is frustrated with her lack of affection towards their two children and her unwillingness to tell him why she's unhappy after being married for nine years. Beth becomes intrigued by a casual acquaintance named Vega Purvis, a chic modeling instructor who is physically ravaged by various illnesses, alcohol and cigarettes, and whose modeling business is in decline after a vaguely detailed scandal. Beth knows Vega is a lesbian and connects her sexuality with Beth's own recurring dreams about Laura Landon, a girl with whom she had an affair in college. Vega calls Beth one evening and asks her to come to a hotel, where Vega shows her the scars that cover her body. Vega becomes emotionally dependent upon Beth over the next several months, as Beth becomes more possessed by the idea of finding Laura once more.

Beth begins to correspond with Nina Spicer, the author of several lesbian books she has been reading. After Beth and Charlie separate, Beth returns to Chicago in search of Laura, who she hasn't contacted in nine years. She learns from Laura's father that she left for New York City many years before. There, Beth and Nina team up to look for Laura in Greenwich Village's gay bars and nightclubs. Nina tests Beth to see whether she's really a lesbian or simply curious, while Beth uses Nina to get to Laura. Beth and Nina eventually sleep together. Afterwards, Beth learns that Vega has been committed to a mental hospital. Tired of Nina's games, Beth ventures to the bars to find Laura herself and finds Beebo Brinker, who is astounded to see her after considering Beth a rival for Laura's affections when they were together years ago.

Beebo points Beth in the direction of the apartment Laura shares with her husband Jack. Beth meets Jack first, who introduces her to their six-year-old daughter. The next morning, Beth surprises Laura and they immediately make love. However, after the surprise has worn off, Laura learns that Beth has left her husband and children, and – hurt and angry still from being left long ago – asks Beth to think about the reasons why she has embarked on this journey to find her. Beth returns to Greenwich Village and finds herself in Beebo's apartment after drinking too much. Discussing what she's done with Beebo, Beth realizes what she must face in order to know what she wants from life. Returning to her hotel, Beth is held hostage by a deranged Vega, who eventually shoots herself. After being questioned, Charlie picks her up from the police station. After Beth asks for a divorce from Charlie, she tells Laura what she knows about herself now. Laura loves her as a friend. Beebo invites Beth back to her apartment after confessing she's fallen for her, and they go together hand in hand.

== Reception ==
The lesbian magazine The Ladder called Journey To A Woman Bannon's best novel to date and called Bannon "a spokesman for her people."

In its review for Beebo Brinker, LGBT magazine The Advocate referred to Journey To A Woman as having Bannon's best sex scenes.

== Sequel ==
Ann Bannon wrote in the foreword for the 2003 edition of Journey To A Woman that she has written, but not yet published, a sequel for this book that discusses the characters in the series, which was apparently written in 1988 initially to be titled "Applehood and Mother Pie".
