= Beebo Brinker =

1962 novel by Ann Bannon

- 1962 first edition cover
- Author: Ann Bannon
- Language: English
- Series: The Beebo Brinker Chronicles
- Genre: Lesbian pulp fiction
- Publisher: Gold Medal Books; Naiad Press; Cleis Press
- Publication date: 1962
- Publication place: United States
- Media type: Print (paperback)
- ISBN: 1-57344-125-2 (2003 edition)
- OCLC: 47198456
- Dewey Decimal: 813/.54 22
- LC Class: PS3552.A495 B44 2003
- Preceded by: Journey to a Woman

Beebo Brinker is a lesbian pulp fiction novel written in 1962 by Ann Bannon (pseudonym of Ann Weldy). It is the last in a series of pulp fiction novels that eventually came to be known as The Beebo Brinker Chronicles. It was originally published in 1962 by Gold Medal Books, again in 1983 by Naiad Press, and again in 2001 by Cleis Press. Each edition was adorned with a different cover. Although this is the last in the series, it is set first — a prequel to the others. In the order of the series, it follows Journey to a Woman. However, in the order of the events and characters in the series, Beebo Brinker takes place several years before Odd Girl Out does.

As Bannon explained in the 2001 edition foreword to Odd Girl Out, Gold Medal Press publishers had control over the cover art and the title. Bannon's publisher titled the book. Lesbian pulp fiction books usually showed suggestive art with obscure titles that hinted at what the subject matter was inside. The painting on the first edition cover is by Robert McGinnis.

== Plot summary ==
Jack Mann finds Beebo Brinker wandering the streets of New York City's Greenwich Village. Beebo is 18 years old, tall and handsome, vacillating between overconfidence and vulnerability after leaving her family's farm in Wisconsin. Beebo is clearly welling up with a terrible secret that forced her to move east, and guilt that comes with leaving her father alone.

Jack helps Beebo get a job delivering pizza (one of the advantages is that she can wear pants) for Pete, who is a little creepy, and his wife who cooks. Jack also allows Beebo to live with him until she gets on her feet, and allows her the time and space to ask the questions he knows she needs to ask. When she admits her frank admiration for a woman she sees, Jack tells her about lesbians, and she reacts with obvious fascination. He escorts her to several gay bars in the Village where she is astonished and touched by what she recognizes in herself.

After being treated cruelly by a vindictive woman playing a game with Pete, Beebo happens upon Paula one evening at her apartment, and it is Paula who verifies Beebo's sexuality. She is roused a couple days later to make a delivery to the apartment of an outrageous movie star, Venus Bogardus, who lives with her lonely teenaged son whom Beebo befriends. Beebo is infatuated and unnerved by Venus, who proposes that Beebo join them to return to California as company for her son — and to bridge the gap between them. Venus, in turn, divulges her past loves with men and women and seduces Beebo.

As Venus rehearses for a television show, Beebo learns her new precarious place at her ranch in California negotiating around Venus' business-minded husband, her public persona, and her vulnerable son. She is essentially kept in secret. A dissatisfied Beebo begins to miss Paula. Being briefly seen with Venus in public causes gossip columnists to start asking questions, and Venus' husband warns Beebo to stay away from Venus. But on the night of the show, Venus' son has an epileptic seizure and cuts his head open. Beebo must find Venus at a wrap party, but is intercepted and beaten by Venus' husband before Beebo can tell her what has happened.

The morning papers unleash rumors of Venus being a lesbian. Unwilling to live in secret with Venus, Beebo returns to New York to recover while Venus and her husband appear happily in public. After a while, Beebo goes to find Paula again, who is thrilled to see her once more. Paula assures her that love can be better and they decide to see for themselves how.

== Beebo Brinker ==
Arguably the most popular of Bannon's characters throughout the series, Beebo Brinker is remarkable in literature — especially in the 1950s and 1960s. She refuses to dress femininely, and readers only once read about her wearing a skirt. In fact, she takes jobs that are clearly below her abilities (elevator operator and delivery boy) and declines a higher education because she knows these vocations would limit her to wearing feminine clothing. A writer who adapted three of the books into a play explained Beebo's draw: "She’s a brave person who tried to pass as a guy at a time when most lesbians were totally under cover. Those women of that era who lived openly like that were heroic. They didn’t live in regular society, they really lived on the edge, they lived on some fringe."

She is described as striking in appearance, tall, muscular, with an unmistakably handsome boyish face. She is intelligent, funny, vulnerable, all at once and she does not apologize for being who she is: a three-dimensional character who is a butch lesbian, when lesbians in literature were rarely mentioned (if only in pulp fiction), and butch ones only as one-dimensional villains. Bannon's characters became archetypes in the lesbian community when there were no role models. As displayed in Strange Sisters: The Art of Lesbian Pulp Fiction, images of butch women were slightly less feminine than other women on pulp fiction covers. Indeed, the image on the 1962 Gold Medal Books cover of Beebo Brinker, which Bannon describes as "god-awful," illustrates how the titillating cover art was designed more for men, and with no design for accuracy.

Ann Bannon has said that Beebo was modeled physically on a sorority sister of hers.

Beebo appears first in I Am A Woman much more confident, in an undetermined number of years after what takes place in Beebo Brinker. She is also in Women In The Shadows less confident and much more flawed, and in Journey To A Woman older and wiser.

== Reception ==
Pulp fiction novels were never reviewed in serious literary journals, but it was reviewed by The Ladder, who called it, "a disappointment" upon initial review in 1962.

Again in 1969 in a retrospective of lesbian paperbacks in The Ladder, Gene Damon claimed Beebo Brinker "a sad failure" and that Beebo's real story lay in the years between arriving in New York and meeting Laura Landon. However, "Gene Damon" was a pseudonym for Barbara Grier, who started Naiad Press — the publishing company that re-released all of Bannon's books in 1983.

Author-editor Katherine V. Forrest included chapter 4 of Beebo Brinker in a compilation of excerpts from what Forrest considered the best examples of lesbian pulp fiction books, aptly named Lesbian Pulp Fiction, in 2005, and called the character Beebo Brinker "arguably still the most iconic figure in all of lesbian fiction."

Upon its release by Cleis Press in 2001, the Lambda Book Report claimed, "Though four decades old, [Beebo Brinker] remains a delightful — and now instructive read."
