= Felice Newman =

Felice Newman is an American author, publisher, sex educator, and coach of soma studies.

== Education ==
Newman has a somatic coaching certificate through the Strozzi Institute in Petaluma, CA. Newman studied human sexuality through the San Francisco Sex Information and the Body Electric School.

== Career ==
Newman co-founded the independent publishing company Cleis Press, with Frédérique Delacoste in 1980. The first book published by Cleis Press was Fight Back: Feminist Resistance to Male Violence, coedited by Newman and Delacoste. The book is now part of the National Criminal Justice Reference Service (NCJRS) virtual library. The book is a series of 66 papers that examine the dynamics of male violence against women. It articulates a spectrum of theoretical perspectives and empirical evidence on female resistance to male violence, providing a nuanced analysis of the complexities involved in these interactions. Newman has appeared on Loveline, Derek & Romaine Show, Jimmy Kimmel (1999), and other radio programs. Her online sex advice has appeared on About.com, ClassicDykes.com, and LesbiaNation.com. Her Whole Lesbian Sex column appears in newspapers across the U.S.

== Bibliography ==
- The Whole Lesbian Sex Book: A Passionate Guide for All of Us - ISBN 978-1-57344-199-5 (author)
- Best Sex Writing 2006 - ISBN 978-1-57344-237-4 (co-editor)
