= William J. Driver =

American politician

William Joshua Driver
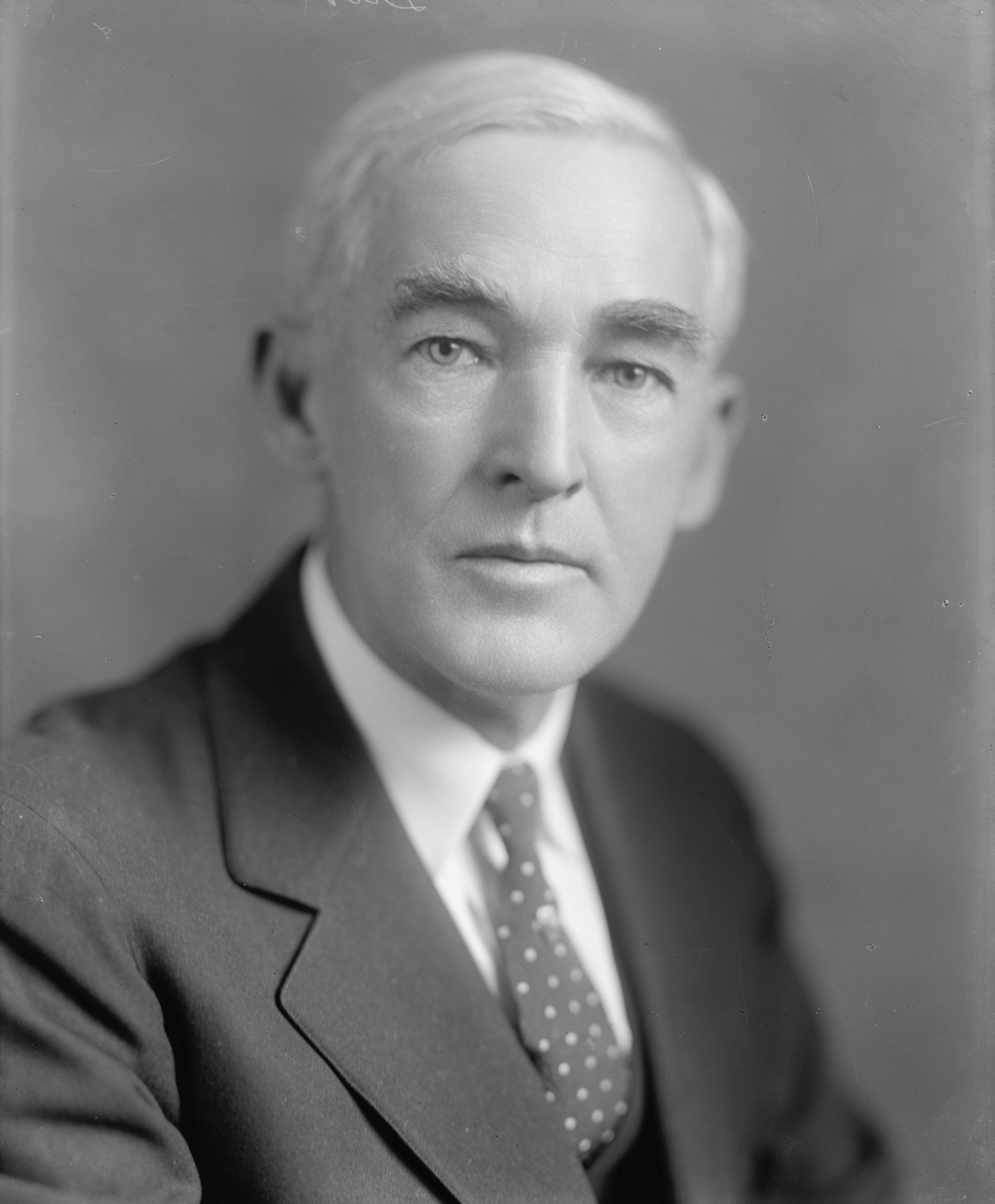

Member of the U.S. House of Representatives from Arkansas's 1st district
- In office March 4, 1921 – January 3, 1939
- Preceded by: Thaddeus H. Caraway
- Succeeded by: Ezekiel C. Gathings

Member of the Arkansas House of Representatives from the Mississippi district
- In office January 11, 1897 – January 9, 1899
- Preceded by: Henry C. Dunavant
- Succeeded by: Thomas A. Matthews
- In office 1899 (Note: Appointed when Matthews resigned.) – January 14, 1901
- Preceded by: Thomas A. Matthews
- Succeeded by: James K.P. Hale

Personal details
- Born: March 2, 1873 Osceola, Arkansas, United States
- Died: October 1, 1948 (aged 75) Osceola, Arkansas
- Party: Democratic
- Spouse: Clara Haynes Driver
- Profession: Attorney, politician, judge, banker

William Joshua Driver (March 2, 1873 – October 1, 1948) was an American politician and a U.S. Representative from Arkansas.

== Biography ==
Born near Osceola, Arkansas, Driver was the son of John B. and Margaret Ann Bowen Driver and attended the public schools. He studied law at eighteen years of age, in the office of Judge G. W. Thomason; was admitted to the bar in 1894, and commenced practice in Osceola, Arkansas. He married Clara Haynes on June 2, 1897, and they had one child.

== Career ==
Driver won election to the Arkansas House of Representatives in 1896. He served in the 31st Arkansas General Assembly, which was contained only Democratic members (a common occurrence during the Solid South period). Thomas A. Matthews won the seat the following cycle, but resigned. The governor appointed Driver to fill the vacancy for the 32nd Arkansas General Assembly.

He was judge of the second judicial circuit of Arkansas from 1911 to 1918, and a member of the State constitutional convention in 1918. He served as delegate to the Democratic National Convention in 1932.

Driver was elected as a Democrat to the Sixty-seventh and to the eight succeeding Congresses serving from March 4, 1921, to January 3, 1939. An unsuccessful candidate for renomination in 1938, he resumed the practice of law and also engaged in the banking business in Osceola, Arkansas, until his death.

== Death ==
Driver died in Osceola, Mississippi County, Arkansas, on October 1, 1948 (age 75 years, 213 days). He is interred at Violet Cemetery, Osceola, Arkansas.

== Notes ==
U.S. House of Representatives
Preceded by Thaddeus H. Caraway	Member of the U.S. House of Representatives from Arkansas's 1st congressional district 1921–1939	Succeeded by Ezekiel C. Gathings
