= The Whole Lesbian Sex Book =

1999 book by Felice Newman

The Whole Lesbian Sex Book: A Passionate Guide for All of Us
- Cover of the first edition
- Author: Felice Newman
- Language: English
- Subject: Lesbian sexual practices
- Publisher: Cleis Press
- Publication date: 1999; 27 years ago
- Publication place: United States
- Media type: Print (Paperback), Digital (E-Book)
- Pages: 400
- ISBN: 978-1-57344-199-5

The Whole Lesbian Sex Book: A Passionate Guide for All of Us is a 1999 book about lesbian sexual practices by the sex educator Felice Newman.

== Overview ==
First published in 1999 by Cleis Press, The Whole Lesbian Sex Book was written to "offer information and encouragement for all women who desire women." The intended audience includes lesbians, bisexuals, butch, femme, androgynous, and transgender people. The second edition was published October 5, 2004 with an additional chapter, new research, an expanded resource guide, and extra illustrations.

== Topics ==
Topics include the importance of communication in any sexual relationship, how to communicate about lesbian sex, exploring personal desires and fantasies, how masturbation improves sex, how to achieve the preferred orgasm, where to find sex partners, expert advice on various lesbian sex techniques, and a guide to picking sex toys.

== Controversy ==
Two teenage brothers from Bentonville, Arkansas, found the book in a public library and told their father. The father complained to the library's director, Bentonville's mayor, and to a local newspaper. He threatened to sue the library if the book was not removed. The Fox News Channel picked up the story in April 2007, which gave it and the book national attention.

== In popular media ==
In an episode of the cable TV show The L Word, The Whole Lesbian Sex Book was given as a gift by somebody involved in a lesbian affair with the recipient, who suggested that they try everything in the book.
