= Ezekiel C. Gathings =

American politician

Ezekiel Candler Gathings
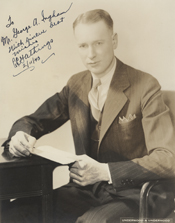

Member of the U.S. House of Representatives from Arkansas's 1st district
- In office January 3, 1939 – January 3, 1969
- Preceded by: William J. Driver
- Succeeded by: Bill Alexander

Member of the Arkansas Senate from the 32nd district
- In office January 14, 1935 – January 9, 1939
- Preceded by: Marvin B. Norfleet
- Succeeded by: J. O. E. Beck, Jr.

Personal details
- Born: November 10, 1903 Prairie, Mississippi, U.S.
- Died: May 2, 1979 (aged 75) West Memphis, Arkansas, U.S.
- Party: Democratic
- Education: University of Alabama (did not graduate); University of Arkansas School of Law

Ezekiel Candler "Took" Gathings (November 10, 1903 – May 2, 1979) was a U.S. representative from Arkansas, representing the first congressional district from 1939 to 1969. A Democrat and segregationist conservative, Gathings was an ally of Strom Thurmond, and stood against all civil rights legislation. Gathings also chaired the 1952 House Select Committee on Current Pornographic Materials, which advocated for censorship of obscene magazines, books, and comics.

== Early life and education ==
After Gathings was born in Prairie, Mississippi, his family moved to Earle, Arkansas when the boy was school-aged.

His nickname was derived from Gathings's younger brother's mispronunciation of his childhood nickname, "Sugar" ("Tooker", shortened to "Took").

Gathings graduated from high school in Earle, and briefly attended University of Alabama. He transferred to the University of Arkansas School of Law, where he graduated in 1929. He was admitted to the bar the same year and commenced practice in Helena, Arkansas. A few years later in 1932, he moved his practice to West Memphis.

== Political career ==
Gathings served in the Arkansas Senate from 1935–1939, representing Crittenden and St. Francis Counties. He served in the 50th and 51st Arkansas General Assembly, which were entirely Democratic during the Solid South period. He was elected as a Democrat (defeating incumbent William J. Driver in the 1938 Democratic primary) to the Seventy-sixth and to the fourteen succeeding Congresses (January 3, 1939 – January 3, 1969) as a representative of Arkansas' 1st Congressional District. He was a signatory of the 1956 Southern Manifesto that opposed the desegregation of public schools ordered by the Supreme Court in Brown v. Board of Education. Gathings voted against the Civil Rights Acts of 1957, the Civil Rights Acts of 1960, the Civil Rights Acts of 1964, and the Civil Rights Acts of 1968 as well as the 24th Amendment to the U.S. Constitution and the Voting Rights Act of 1965.

== Retirement and death ==
Gathings resided in West Memphis, Arkansas, where he died May 2, 1979. He was interred in Crittenden Memorial Park, Marion, Arkansas.

U.S. House of Representatives
| Preceded by William J. Driver | Member of the U.S. House of Representatives from Arkansas's 1st congressional district 1939–1969 | Succeeded by Bill Alexander |
