= Women's Barracks =

1950 lesbian pulp fiction novel by Tereska Torrès

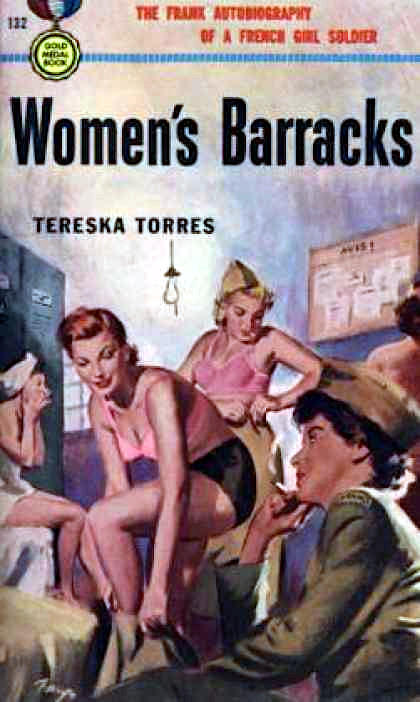
- 1950 cover by Baryè Phillips
- Author: Tereska Torrès
- Translator: Meyer Levin
- Cover artist: Baryè Phillips
- Genre: Lesbian pulp fiction
- Set in: London
- Publisher: Fawcett Gold Medal (1950); Consul Books (1962, 1964); Sphere Books (1972); Feminist Press (2003)
- Publication date: 1950
- Publication place: US
- Media type: Paperback
- Website: Women's Barracks at Feminist Press

Women's Barracks: The Frank Autobiography of a French Girl Soldier is a classic work of lesbian pulp fiction by French writer Tereska Torrès published in 1950. Historians credit it as the first US paperback-original bestseller, as the first lesbian pulp fiction book published in America, and as "the pioneer of lesbian fiction". As the first of its genre, it received heavy backlash, and it was banned in Canada. Its popularity prompted the formation of the House Select Committee on Current Pornographic Materials in the United States. Its original cover art is considered a classic image of lesbian fiction.

== Author ==
Tereska Torrès was a member of the Corps des Volontaires françaises within Free French Forces, and worked as a secretary in Charles de Gaulle's London headquarters. After the war, Torrès's husband Meyer Levin urged her to publish her wartime diaries. Torrès wrote the book as "a serious-minded account of wartime situations" and an exploration of "the way in which conventional mores break down during conflict". She wrote the manuscript in French, and her husband translated it into English.

For a half century, Torrès refused to allow Women's Barracks to be published in France because she felt readers might come away thinking the Free French Forces had behaved irresponsibly in London. In 2010, she rewrote and translated it back into French, and it was released in 2011 under the title Jeunes Femmes en Uniforme (Young Women in Uniform).

The diaries upon which she based the book were also published. In 2007, The Independent called them "frank, moving and funny diaries of life in wartime London" and "among the finest first-hand accounts of Britain during The Blitz".

== Plot ==
A group of five young French women live together in a house in London during the Second World War while serving in the Free French Forces.

The book is about the lives of the five women, including Claude and Ursula, and their compulsive lovemaking. In the evenings, people of all ages shelter in underground stations, and young men and women pack into crowded pubs, clubs, and restaurants, while high explosives fall nearby. One of the five women has a passionate affair with a well-known and married Englishman, an episode based on a real-life love affair between one of the author’s French friends and the actor Leslie Howard. There are also lesbian encounters.

== Publication history ==
In 1950 Fawcett Gold Medal published Women's Barracks in the United States with a print run of 200,000 and a cover by Baryè Phillips that "signalled the lesbian content within" and according to Salon, has been "long considered a classic image of lesbian fiction". According to Duke University:

The cover image gained instant attention from American readers because it featured four women partially dressed on the cover, all in one room standing and sitting close to each other. The women on the cover featured two brunettes, one blonde, and one woman with red hair. One woman was in just a small white towel, while two of the other women were in the process of getting dressed, shown in just their bras and spandex, and the fourth woman was featured in the corner of the cover wearing her military uniform. Since there are no men featured on the cover, and the women are exchanging romantic glances between each other, the cover art was a sign that this book contained lesbian characters and possibly a homosexual romantic story line.

A fictionalized account of Torrès's wartime experiences, the book "quickly became the first paperback original bestseller," selling over two million copies in its first five years. In 1962 Consul Books released an edition and reprinted in 1964. In 1972 Sphere Books released an edition.

When Feminist Press republished the book in 2003, it was described as having inspired the then-new genre of lesbian and feminist literature in the United States and called a pioneering work. As of 2005 a total of 4 million copies of the book had been sold in the United States and it had been translated into 13 languages.

Feminist Press called it "the first lesbian pulp novel". Torrès rejected the description, saying, "There are five main characters. Only one and a half of them can be considered lesbian. I don't see why it's considered a lesbian classic". She told Salon she thought she had written a "very innocent book" and said, "these Americans, they are easily shocked."

== Reception and impact ==
The release created a "ripple effect" in the publishing industry. While the publisher had marketed the book to male readers, the book created a new market for pulp fiction among women, and Fawcett Gold Medal soon began publishing other lesbian pulp fiction.

Historians credit it as the first US paperback-original bestseller, as the first pulp fiction book published in America to address lesbian relationships, and as "the pioneer of lesbian fiction". Literary historian Kaye Mitchell dates the subgenre of lesbian pulp fiction as starting with the book's publication. As the first of its genre, it received heavy backlash. It is considered a classic in its genre. According to literary scholar Yvonne Keller, it created the genre of lesbian pulp fiction.

According to the 2003 Feminist Press afterword by film scholar Judith Mayne, the book was "an important part of the history that made lesbian lives and lesbian desire a central part of paperback publishing in the United States."

== Banning and government investigations ==
It was banned in Canada, where a Crown prosecutor argued it was "nothing but a description of lewdness from beginning to end", and in several US states. In 1952, the US House of Representatives formed the House Select Committee on Current Pornographic Materials in reaction to the book's popularity. The Committee used the book to illustrate how paperback books "promoted moral degeneracy". A letter from "a literary expert" read into the minutes by Fawcett president Ralph Foster Daigh compared "Women's Barracks with Plato, Homer, Sappho, Shakespeare, and Marlowe", scandalizing the members of the committee.

The book was not banned nationwide in the US because Fawcett agreed to add a narrator who commented disapprovingly on the characters' behavior so as to "teach moral lessons" about the "problem" of lesbianism. The publicity from the government investigation prompted the book's second edition.

== See also ==
- Pulp magazines
- Lesbian literature
