= Odd Girl Out (novel) =

1957 novel by Ann Bannon

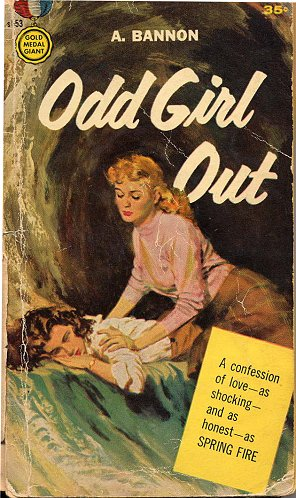
- First edition cover
- Author: Ann Bannon
- Cover artist: Barrye Phillips
- Language: English
- Series: The Beebo Brinker Chronicles
- Genre: Lesbian pulp fiction
- Publisher: Gold Medal Books
- Publication date: 1957
- Publication place: United States
- Media type: Print (Paperback)
- ISBN: 1-57344-128-7 (2001 edition)
- OCLC: 1418753 (2001 edition)
- Dewey Decimal: 813/.54 22
- LC Class: PS3552.A495 O33 2001
- Followed by: I Am a Woman

Odd Girl Out is a lesbian pulp fiction novel written in 1957 by Ann Bannon (pseudonym of Ann Weldy), the first in a series of pulp fiction novels that eventually came to be known as The Beebo Brinker Chronicles. It was originally published in 1957 by Gold Medal Books, again in 1983 by Naiad Press, and again in 2001 by Cleis Press. Each edition was adorned with a different cover. Not until 1983 did author Bannon learn that her first novel was the second best-selling paperback of 1957.

Bannon's original story submitted to Gold Medal Books was about events in a sorority, in which a subplot involved an affair two women were having. Her editor handed it back to her and told her to focus on the two women. When she returned to the editor, the book was published without changing a word of her second version, and it became Odd Girl Out. As Bannon explained in the 2001 edition foreword, Gold Medal publishers had control over the cover art and the title. Lesbian pulp fiction books usually showed suggestive art with obscure titles that hinted at what the subject matter was inside.

Bannon was inspired to write her books after reading Spring Fire by Vin Packer and The Well of Loneliness by Radclyffe Hall. In fact, it was Marijane Meaker (Vin Packer's real name) that Bannon wrote to and who introduced her to her publisher at Gold Medal Books. Bannon was 22 years old when she began writing Odd Girl Out.

== Plot summary ==
Laura Landon is a sheltered freshman at a fictional university in a midwestern town. Intensely shy and introverted, she is drawn to the president of the student union, Beth Cullison. Beth is outgoing and friendly, experienced socially (with men, particularly) but feels a void in her life. She doesn't understand how the other girls are so fulfilled by the men in their lives, despite having tried. Every time she allows herself to be intimate with one, she breaks it off out of disappointment.

Beth shares a room in the sorority house with Emmy, and convinces Laura to pledge the sorority. Feeling a pull to Beth, Laura delights in her presence and experiences jealousy and confusion in her attachment to the older woman. They go on dates together, and Beth considers Laura something of an enigma, unsure of how to reach out to her to get to know her well. Laura finds herself especially jealous of Beth's most recent beau, Charlie, who to Beth's surprise has awoken some new feelings in her. Laura is often so at odds with her unemotional upbringing conflicting with the intensity of the emotions she experiences for Beth that she practices self-injury.

Cleis Press edition (2001) cover

Beth begins to realize what effect she has on Laura and teases her good-naturedly to watch what happens to her, but she is taken back by Laura's intense attraction, and they begin an affair. This is compounded by her escalating relationship with Charlie, who is frustrated with Beth's vacillating between affection for him and her guilt for hurting Laura.

Beth loses faith with her sorority and the university when, during a costume party, Emmy gets drunk and her boyfriend, Bud, hoists her scantily clad over his shoulder and the top of her costume falls off. The sorority kicks her out after she is caught in the middle of coitus with Bud, having previously been told not to see him. Bud is angered by this and feels partly to blame. He reassures Emmy and promises to marry her. Whether or not he will fulfill his promise remains ambiguous. Emmy writes to Beth about her frustration when she doesn't hear from Bud, and about her feelings of estrangement from her community.

Disillusioned and not sure what to do, Beth agrees to leave school to be with Laura. They plan to run away to Greenwich Village. When Charlie corners Laura, she tells him about their relationship, triumphant that she can have what Charlie cannot. Charlie then confronts Beth when she is on her way to meet Laura at the train station. He calls her relationship with Laura childish, to which Beth admits that she only loves Laura, not him. Charlie drops her off at the station and says she must make her own decision, but he will wait nearby for half an hour, just in case. Beth finally reveals the truth to Laura when she meets her at the station. Laura stays on the train resolute her love for Beth and even thanks her for teaching her who she is. Beth says her goodbyes to Laura and rushes off to catch Charlie.

== Reception ==
Novels published as pulp were never seriously reviewed in literary magazines; however, The Ladder recommended Odd Girl Out in 1957, noting that "the context is not so sensational as most pocket books on this theme. The problems of heterosexual love as well as homosexual love are equally well presented — with understanding and sympathy."

In a 1969 retrospective of lesbian paperback fiction, Odd Girl Out was described as having "all the requirements: youth, sex, love, sex, hope, sex, and no real lack of sympathy.

Author Katherine V. Forrest described purchasing and reading Odd Girl Out: "Overwhelming need led me to walk a gauntlet of fear up to the cash register. Fear so intense that I remember nothing more, only that I stumbled out of the store in possession of what I knew I must have, a book as necessary to me as air... I found it when I was eighteen years old. It opened the door to my soul and told me who I was." Forrest also credits Bannon, quite frankly, with saving her life.
