= Ann Bannon =

American author

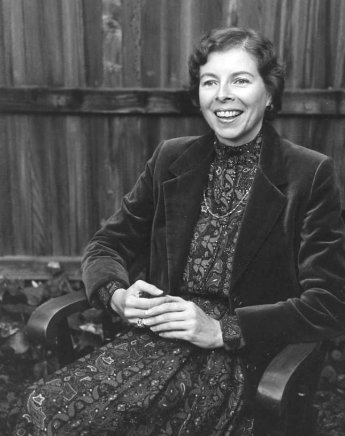
- 1983 photo
- Born: Ann Weldy; September 15, 1932 (age 94); Joliet, Illinois, U.S.
- Occupations: Writer; professor; associate dean
- Writing career
- Period: 1957–present
- Genres: Lesbian pulp fiction; LGBT history
- Notable works: Odd Girl Out; I Am a Woman; Women in the Shadows; Journey to a Woman; Beebo Brinker
- Website: www.annbannon.com

Ann Weldy (born September 15, 1932), better known by her pen name Ann Bannon, is an American author who, from 1957 to 1962, wrote five lesbian pulp fiction novels known as The Beebo Brinker Chronicles. The books' enduring popularity and impact on lesbian identity has earned her the title "Queen of Lesbian Pulp Fiction". Bannon was a young housewife trying to address her own issues of sexuality when she was inspired to write her first novel. Her subsequent books featured four characters who reappeared throughout the series, including her eponymous heroine, Beebo Brinker, who came to embody the archetype of a butch lesbian. The majority of her characters mirrored people she knew, but their stories reflected a life she did not feel she was able to live. Despite her traditional upbringing and role in married life, her novels defied conventions for romance stories and depictions of lesbians by addressing complex homosexual relationships.

Her books shaped lesbian identity for lesbians and heterosexuals alike, but Bannon was mostly unaware of their impact. She stopped writing in 1962. Later, she earned a doctorate in linguistics and became an academic. She endured a difficult marriage for 27 years and, as she separated from her husband in the 1980s, her books were republished; she was stunned to learn of their influence on society. They were released again between 2001 and 2003 and were adapted as an award-winning Off-Broadway production. They are taught in women's and LGBT studies courses, and Bannon has received numerous awards for pioneering lesbian and gay literature. She has been described as "the premier fictional representation of US lesbian life in the fifties and sixties", and it has been said that her books "rest on the bookshelf of nearly every even faintly literate Lesbian".

== Early life ==
Ann Bannon was born Ann Weldy in Joliet, Illinois, in 1932. She was the only child of her mother's first marriage. Her mother married again and had a son with her second husband. Her mother married a third time and had four more sons.

Bannon grew up in nearby Hinsdale with her mother and stepfather, and had the responsibility of taking care of four siblings due to the family's financial problems. She took comfort in a vibrant imaginary life during this time and found solace in writing. Growing up, she was surrounded by music, particularly jazz, as her family hosted small recitals for friends and neighbors. One became a character in her books: a perennial bachelor named Jack who slung jokes and witticisms at the audiences.

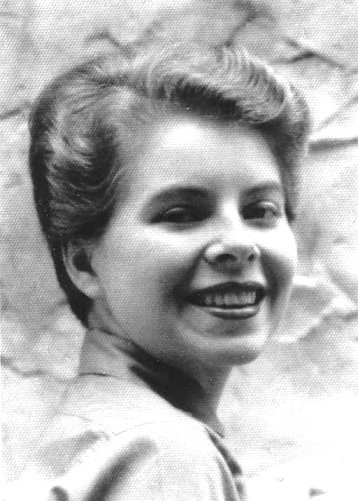
Bannon in 1955, just as Odd Girl Out was being completed

At the University of Illinois at Urbana–Champaign she belonged to Kappa Kappa Gamma sorority where she befriended a beautiful older sorority sister, "the prettiest I had ever seen", quite popular with men and with women. Bannon witnessed a younger sorority sister's unabashed infatuation with the older sister. She recalls it was an awkward situation, even though the older sorority sister was "unfailingly gracious" to the younger one. In recognizing the younger woman's attractions, she began to suspect her own sexuality. She said, "I saw a lot of it happening and I didn't know what to make of it. I don't even know how to put it—I was absolutely consumed with it, it was an extraordinary thing." Another sorority sister was physically remarkable, very tall—almost 6 feet (1.8 m), with a husky voice and boyish nickname, that Bannon imagined was a blend of Johnny Weissmuller and Ingrid Bergman. She recalled entering the communal restroom and seeing the sister, "both of us in underwear, and experienc(ing) a sort of electric shock", and trying not to stare at her. In 1954, she graduated with a degree in French and soon married an engineer thirteen years older whose job made them relocate frequently.

Bannon was 22 years old when she began writing her first pulp novel. She was influenced by the only lesbian novels she had read, The Well of Loneliness by Radclyffe Hall from 1928 and Vin Packer's Spring Fire from 1952, albeit in two different ways: she was unable to relate to the dismal tones in Hall's novel, but as a sorority girl was more familiar with the plot and circumstances of Spring Fire. Bannon said, "Both books completely obsessed me for the better part of two years." Although recently married and on her way to having two children, she found the books struck a chord in her life and recognized emotions in herself that compelled her to write about them. In the beginning of her marriage she was left alone quite a lot and said, "I was kind of desperate to get some of the things that had been consuming me for a long time down on paper." In 1956, after having sent her first manuscript to Marijane Meaker (Packer's real name), Meaker invited her to New York to discuss the manuscript with Meaker's editor at Gold Medal Books; Bannon said her husband "only let [her] go because [she'd] discovered that there was a women’s hotel called the Barbizon.”

== Writing career ==
=== Background ===
Paperback books in the United States expanded prominently after World War II through the marketing strategies of Pocket Books, who began to distribute publications through newspapers, newsstands, grocery stores, and bus and train stations. The retail opportunities of paperback books grew about tenfold with this method. In 1950, rival company Gold Medal Books published Women's Barracks, a fictionalized account of author Tereska Torrès' experience serving in the Free French Forces. The book depicts a lesbian relationship the author witnessed, ending with one of the women committing suicide. It sold 4.5 million copies, and Gold Medal Books' editors were "thrilled". Its success earned it a mention in the House Select Committee on Current Pornographic Materials in 1952. Gold Medal Books was a branch of Fawcett Publications that focused on paperback books which at the time were printed on very cheap paper, not designed to last for more than a year, sold for 25 cents in drug stores and other venues all over the United States and Canada. The books made for cheap, easy reading that could be discarded at the end of a trip at very little cost to the customer. Because of the low quality of production, they earned the name pulp fiction.

Gold Medal Books quickly followed Women's Barracks with Spring Fire, eager to cash in on the unprecedented sales, and it sold almost 1.5 million copies in 1952. Vin Packer, whose real name is Marijane Meaker, and Gold Medal Books were overwhelmed with mail from women who identified with the lesbian characters.

One of the letters was from Bannon, asking for professional assistance in getting published. On writing to Meaker, she said, "To this day I have no idea why she responded to me out of the thousands of letters she was getting at that time. Thank God she did. I was both thrilled and terrified." Bannon visited Meaker and was introduced to Greenwich Village, which made a significant impression on Bannon: she called it "Emerald City, Wonderland, and Brigadoon combined—a place where gay people could walk the crooked streets hand in hand." Meaker set up a meeting with Gold Medal Books editor Dick Carroll, who read Bannon's initial 600-page manuscript. It was a story about the women in her sorority whom she admired, with a subplot consisting of two sorority sisters who had fallen in love with each other. Carroll told her to take it back and focus on the two characters who had an affair. Bannon claims she went back and told their story, delivered the draft to Carroll and saw it published without a single word changed. While raising two young children, Bannon lived in Philadelphia and took trips into New York City to visit Greenwich Village and stayed with friends. She said of the women she saw in Greenwich Village, "I wanted to be one of them, to speak to other women, if only in print. And so I made a beginning—and that beginning was the story that became Odd Girl Out."

=== The Beebo Brinker Chronicles ===
The Beebo Brinker Chronicles contains five books in all, first published between 1957 and 1962. They featured four characters who appeared in at least three of the books in a chronological saga of coming to terms with their homosexuality and navigating their ways through gay and lesbian relationships.

==== Odd Girl Out ====
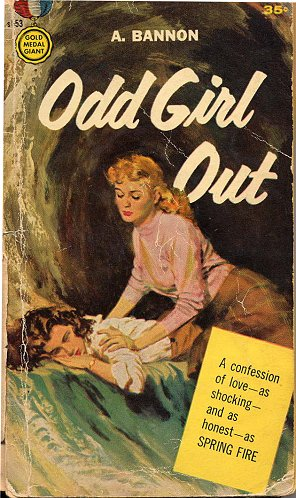
Original Gold Medal Books cover of Odd Girl Out, published in 1957

The first book in the series, Odd Girl Out, was published in 1957, and became Gold Medal Books' second best-selling title of the year. Based on Bannon's own experiences, the plot involved a lesbian relationship between two sorority sisters in a fictional sorority at a fictional midwestern university. As was custom with pulp fiction novels, neither the cover art nor the title were under the control of the author. Both were approved by the publisher in order to be as suggestive and lurid as possible. The main character is Laura Landon, who realizes that she's in love with Beth, her older, more experienced roommate, a leader in the sorority.

Lesbians depicted in literature were relatively rare in the 1950s. It was the publisher's policy in any novel involving lesbianism that the characters would never receive any satisfaction from the relationship. One or both usually ended up committing suicide, going insane, or leaving the relationship. Marijane Meaker discusses this in the 2004 foreword of Spring Fire: she was told by editor Dick Carroll that because the books were distributed by the U.S. Post Office instead of private companies delivering directly to stores, postal inspectors would send the books back to the publisher if homosexuality was depicted positively. The Postal Service relaxed their censorship after several First Amendment obscenity trials, including Roth v. United States and another regarding Allen Ginsberg's Howl in the mid-1950s, which gave Bannon a modicum of freedom in her plots. Although the ending to Odd Girl Out did not veer too far from the unsatisfactory resolution formula of Spring Fire, Women's Barracks, and Radclyffe Hall's The Well of Loneliness, it examined Laura's internal struggle in the realization that despite her femininity, she was deeply in love with another woman, and at the end she embraced it, which was rare in lesbian fiction.

The characters and their stories served as an extension of the fantasy life Bannon developed as a child. They became her "fantasy friends" whose loves and lives she witnessed and through which she lived her own life vicariously, helping her through a difficult marriage, and a longing for a life she did not feel she was free to live. "I realized very early that I should not marry, but I was going to make the best of a bad thing, and I was going to make it a good thing," she remembered. Having no practical experience in a lesbian relationship while writing Odd Girl Out, she set out to gain what she termed "fieldwork experience" in her trips to Greenwich Village, and was successful enough to introduce those experiences into the next book in the series before relocating once more to Southern California. But she explained her fears about staying in Greenwich Village, saying

I would sit there (in a gay bar) in the evenings thinking, 'What if (a police raid) happens tonight and I get hauled off to the slam with all these other women?' I had been extremely low profile, very proper, very Victorian wife. I know that sounds crazy in the 60s, but I was raised by my mother and grandmother, who really came out of that era, and talk about a rigid role-playing crowd! I couldn't imagine living through it. I just couldn't. I thought, 'Well, that would do it. I'd have to go jump off the Brooklyn Bridge.' As easy as it might be if you were a young woman in today's generation to think that was exaggerating, it wasn't. It was terrifying.

==== I Am a Woman ====
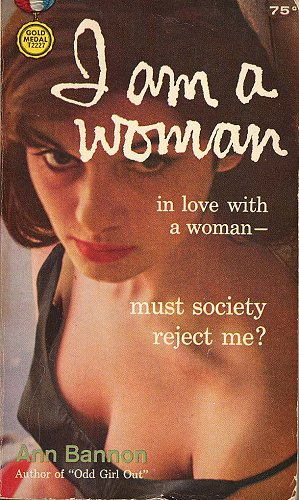
Original Gold Medal Books cover of I Am a Woman from 1959

Bannon followed Odd Girl Out with I Am a Woman (In Love With a Woman — Must Society Reject Me?) in 1959. I Am a Woman (the working and common title) featured Laura after her affair with Beth, as she finds herself in New York City's Greenwich Village, and meets a wisecracking gay man named Jack, and becomes his best friend. Laura has to choose between a straight woman with a wild and curious streak, and a fascinating new character that proved to be her most popular of the series, Beebo Brinker, who came to embody the description of a thoroughly butch lesbian. Beebo was smart, handsome, chivalrous, and virile. Once again based on what Bannon knew, Beebo was nearly 6 feet (1.8 m) tall with a husky voice and a formidable physique. The personality however, Bannon says, was drawn out of her sheer need for Beebo to exist. After spending time in Greenwich Village and not finding anyone like her, Bannon instead created her. She remembered, "I put Beebo together just as I wanted her, in my heart and mind ... She was just, quite literally, the butch of my dreams." The resolution to I Am a Woman completely flouted the trends of miserable lesbian fiction endings, which made Bannon a hero to many lesbians.

Letters began to pour in for her from all over the country. There were mostly propositions from men, but the letters from women thanked her profusely and begged her for reassurance that they would be all right. Bannon described the impact her books had from the letters she received from people who were isolated in small towns: "The most important things they learned (from the books) were that 1) they weren't unique and doomed to lifelong isolation, 2) ... they weren't 'abnormal,' and 3) there was hope for a happy life. They wrote to me in thousands, asking me to confirm these wonderful things, which I gladly did—even though I felt only marginally better informed than they were." The books were even translated into other languages, which was also quite rare for the brief lives of pulp novels. Bannon received international and domestic mail from women, saying, "This is the only book (and they would say this about all of them) that I've read where the women really love each other, where its OK for them to love each other, and they don't have to kill themselves afterwards."

==== Women in the Shadows ====
Although her husband was aware of the books she was writing, he showed no interest in the subject. He was interested enough in the money she made from them, however, but had forbidden her to use her married surname, not wishing to see it on a book cover with art of questionable taste. She took the name "Bannon" from a list of his customers and liked it because it contained her own name in it. She continued to experience difficulty in her marriage, however, and in realizing that "not all lesbians were nice people", she took these frustrations out on her characters. "I couldn't stand some of what was happening to me–but Beebo could take it. Beebo really, in a way, had my nervous breakdown for me ... I think I was overwhelmed with grief and anger that I was not able to express," she recalled later. Women in the Shadows was also published in 1959 and proved very unpopular with Bannon's readers. The book examined interracial relationships, self-loathing in matters of sexuality and race, alcoholism, jealousy, violence, and as Laura marries Jack in an atypical arrangement in the 1950s, also explored the intricate details of what it was like to pass as heterosexual in an attempt to live some semblance of what was considered a normal life at the time.

==== Journey to a Woman ====
Her fourth book in the series, Journey to a Woman, published in 1960, again shows parallels between Bannon's own life and her plots. Beth, of Laura's affair in Odd Girl Out, is living with her husband and children in Southern California. She tries to find Laura again nine years after college, and escapes a deranged woman who has a fixation on her, a reflection of a relationship Bannon had with a beautiful, but "very bewildered and unstable person." Beth writes to an author of lesbian books in New York, and goes to meet her in hope of finding Laura. They have a brief relationship, after which Beth finds Laura married to Jack and with a child, then discovers Beebo as well.

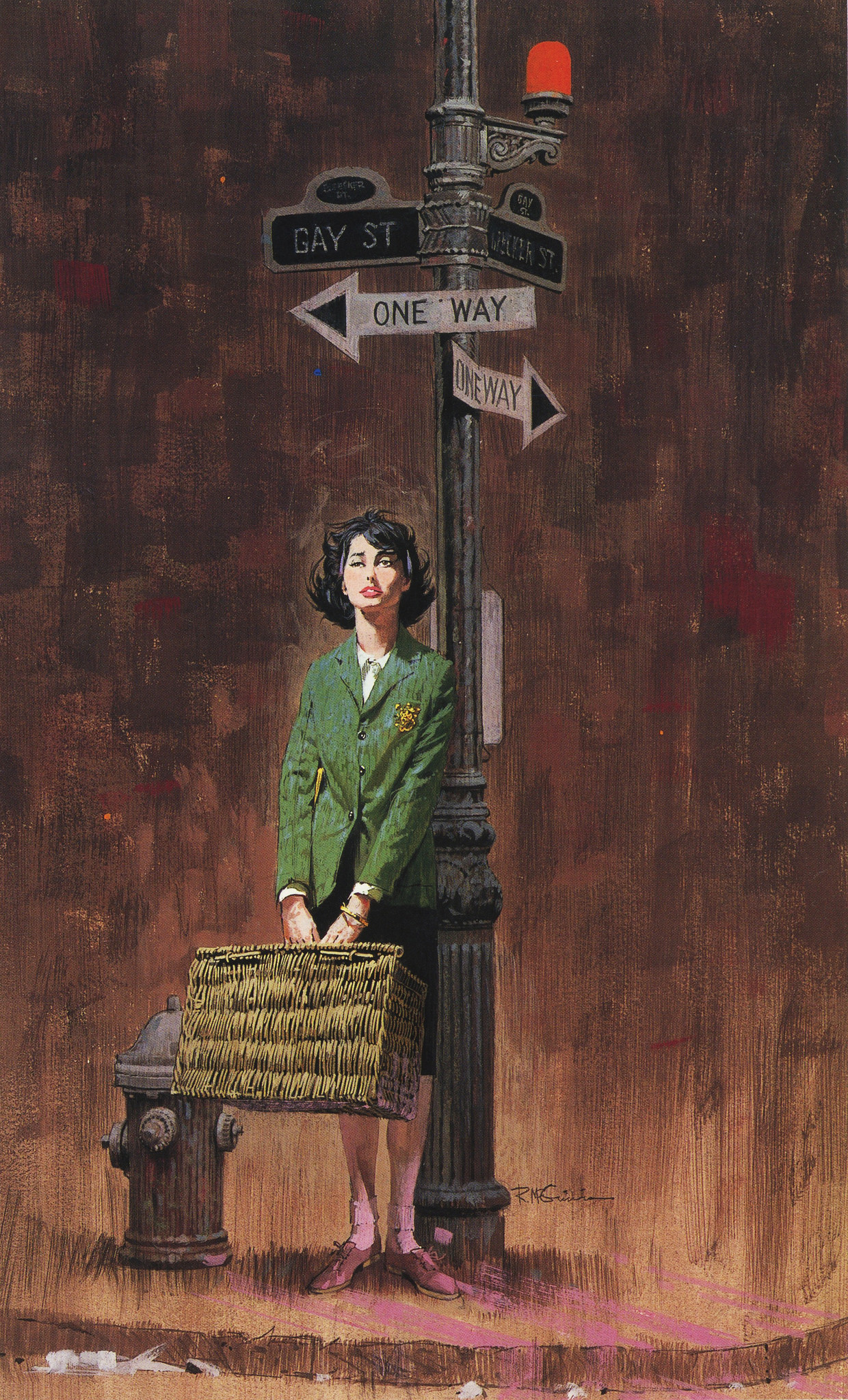
Cover of Beebo Brinker by Bannon

==== Beebo Brinker ====
Returning to the character she fantasized about the most, the last book in the series, Beebo Brinker, published in 1962, was Bannon's prequel to Odd Girl Out. It follows Beebo around Greenwich Village ten years before she meets Laura in I Am a Woman. Beebo gets off the bus from her rural hometown into New York City to find a waiting friend in Jack, and to discover herself. She begins an affair with a famous and fading movie star, and follows her to California, only to return to be more honest about what she wants in her life.

=== Other works ===
==== The Marriage ====
Her fifth novel, The Marriage, was published in 1960, in-between Journey to a Woman and Beebo Brinker. The Marriage again addresses issues of love outside the realm of socially acceptable relationships, although it is not primarily about homosexuality. In it, Jack and Laura are friends with a young married couple who discover they are brother and sister, and must decide whether they will stay together or conform to societal standards.

In 1961 and 1962 Bannon also contributed several articles to ONE, Inc., the magazine of a homophile activist organization in Southern California. One of them was a chapter that had been cut from the final draft of Women in the Shadows.

=== End of writing career ===
She was invited to speak to the Mattachine Society in the early 1960s, but her husband's stern disapproval of her activities began to take its toll. She stated later, "It began to be very painful. So every time I would start to reach out (to the lesbian/gay community), I would get struck down ... In my own life, I couldn't operationalize (my feeling that gays should end the secrecy and take more pride in themselves and their lives). I couldn't find a way."

After Beebo Brinker, Bannon said the energy to write about the characters left her, but she got so good at her "obsessive fantasies" that even after the books were written she continued to live internally, and suspected it affected her subsequent relationships. "I realize now that I was in a sort of 'holding pattern,' a way of keeping my sanity intact while waiting for my children to grow up and the freedom door to open", she recalled. Returning to school, Bannon completed her master's degree at Sacramento State University and her doctorate in linguistics at Stanford University. She was an English professor at Sacramento State and later became associate dean of the School of Arts and Sciences—later the College of Arts and Letters.

== Rediscovery ==
Bannon's books began to fade away from publishing memory after initial publication, especially after Gold Medal Books went out of business. In 1975, however, Bannon was asked to include four of her books in Arno Press's library edition of Homosexuality: Lesbians and Gay Men in Society, History and Literature. Then, in 1983, Barbara Grier of the lesbian publishing company Naiad Press actively tracked Bannon down and reissued the books in new covers. Grier discussed the novels, answering the question of who among lesbian paperback authors should be highlighted: "Ann Bannon. Without even a discussion ... In terms of actual influence, sales, everything, Bannon."

Bannon did not outwardly advertise the fact that the books had been released again in her department at Sacramento State. Not being tenured, she was unsure how the information would be received. However, word got out: "I was jet-propelled out of the closet. People stared at me around campus, and the PE majors all waved. My chairman told me to put the books into my promotion file, and one of my colleagues told me my file was the only one that was any fun." She often received small recognitions from students and faculty who were pleased and surprised, once getting a bouquet of flowers from a student. She said of the rediscovery, "I was so ready for something fresh and exciting in my life. It had seemed to me, up to that point, that not only had the books and the characters died, so had Ann Bannon." However, following a bitter divorce, and just as the Naiad Press editions of her books were released, Bannon endured a bout of chronic fatigue syndrome, which she connects to repressing herself for so long. "You've got to think that it's connected, somehow. At the time I denied it fiercely, but I really think I beat myself up horribly, in ways I'll never know."

In 1984, Bannon's books were featured in the documentary Before Stonewall about how gay men and lesbians lived prior to the 1969 Stonewall riots, wherein one woman remembered picking up one of Bannon's books for the first time: "I picked up this paperback and I opened it up ... and it sent a shiver of excitement in my whole body that I had never felt before." She was featured in the Canadian documentary Forbidden Love: The Unashamed Stories of Lesbian Lives in 1992, which recounted women's personal stories of living as lesbians from the 1940s to 1960s. The books were selected for the Quality Paperback Book Club in 1995. Bannon also provided the foreword for Strange Sisters: The Art of Lesbian Pulp Fiction 1949–1969 in 1999, discussing her reaction to the artwork on her own books and the other lesbian pulp fiction books she bought and read. Five of The Beebo Brinker Chronicles were reissued by Cleis Press again between 2001 and 2003—excluding The Marriage—with autobiographical forewords that described Bannon's experiences of writing the books and her reaction to their popularity, causing another wave of interest.

Reacting to the renewed interest in the books, Bannon wrote in the 2002 introduction to Odd Girl Out that she was shocked to find out that her characters were not only remembered but that they were archetypes among the lesbian community. The books are frequently on required reading lists for Women's and LGBT studies college courses. Bannon often admits to being surprised by this, explaining that she had no such aspirations when she was writing Odd Girl Out: "If I had known, it might well have resulted in a much more polished product, but one that would have been so cautious and self-conscious as to be entirely forgettable. It would never—my best guess—have had the vibrant life it has now."

Literary scholar Yvonne Keller named Bannon as one of a small group of writers whose work formed the subgenre of "pro-lesbian" pulp fiction; others include Sloane Britain, Paula Christian, Joan Ellis, March Hastings, Marjorie Lee, Della Martin, Rea Michaels, Claire Morgan, Vin Packer, Randy Salem, Artemis Smith, Valerie Taylor, Tereska Torres, and Shirley Verel.

== Themes ==
=== Identity ===
Since so little information was available about lesbians and lesbianism at the time, Bannon's books, through their far-reaching distribution and popularity served to form a part of a lesbian identity not only for the heterosexual population at large, but lesbians themselves. Lesbian author and historian Joan Nestle called the books "survival literature", explaining: "In whatever towns or cities these books were read, they were spreading the information that meant a new hope for trapped and isolated women". One retrospective writer noted, "[U]ntil the late 1960s, when the sexual revolution was emerging, the pulps provided a cultural space that helped to forge a queer identity".

Scholar Andrea Loewenstein published the first in-depth review of Bannon's books in 1980, and notes that they were "exceptionally good pulp" that caused unexpected strong feelings of sadness or anger among lesbians when they were read twenty years after being published. Bannon depicts strict roles of butch and femme, and gays and lesbians as self-destructive, closeted, paranoid, and alcoholic. Loewenstein remarks that readers in 1980 had a tendency to reject that kind of reality in Bannon's stories. "Since much of our past is so bitter, [we] ... pretend away our most recent history". Loewenstein suggests the struggles Bannon's characters endured were ones that Bannon must have faced herself. When Laura declares her joy in her love for Beth in Odd Girl Out while simultaneously questioning if it is right, Loewenstein states "one hears quite clearly the voice of Ann Bannon, questioning her own right to happiness". Similarly, remarking on Bannon's treatment of Beebo in Women in the Shadows by making her violent, alcoholic and self-destructive, Loewenstein notes, "she needs to humiliate Beebo so badly that she makes her disappear". Loewenstein remarks Bannon's characters are deeply conflicted by enjoying relationships they feel are morally wrong, and they are acting out cycles of self-hatred, though what remains at the end is "surprisingly ... passionate, tender, and erotic".

Writer Diane Hamer attests that Bannon's books and characters represent a part of identity where women are unsure if they are gay or straight, man or woman, ashamed or accepting of who they are. In receiving no clear answers from Bannon herself, women were left to try to figure these questions out for themselves. Hamer writes, "What Bannon did was to provide a range of possible trajectories to lesbianism ... Bannon, by constructing fictional biographies for her lesbian characters, produced a new knowledge about how one arrives at a lesbian identity."

Bannon also addresses the issue of race in Women in the Shadows when Laura begins an affair with a woman representing herself as Eastern Indian, but who is actually a lighter skinned African American. The duality of their relationship is expressed not only in skin color but through their personalities. Laura, blond and passionate, contrasts with Tris, who is dark but emotionally detached. Race, in this instance, is a "metaphor for the opposition between inside and outside that govern Bannon's sense of what a lesbian is".

The concept of a lesbian identity is also explored throughout Journey to a Woman, as Beth leaves her husband and children to find Laura. Beth is followed by Vega, a woman scarred deeply—both emotionally and physically—with whom Beth had an affair. Vega shoots herself at the end of the story. Scholar Christopher Nealon suggests that Vega's scars and emotional pain represent the anguish of self-hatred and the self-destructive phases Bannon imposed upon her characters in Women in the Shadows. Because Laura has grown from the complete adoration of Beth in Odd Girl Out and is unable to give Beth the same devotion when Beth finds her again, Nealon writes that Bannon makes the point that it is impossible to sustain "a lesbian identity that always returns to the moment of self-discovery". Beth, instead, finds Beebo, now older and much calmer, who gives her hope and the promise of love, which Nealon equates to a final identity for Bannon's characters.

In the new forewords to the Cleis Press editions, Bannon addressed the criticisms of her characters as self-destructive in limiting roles, explaining that she simply depicted what she knew and felt at the time. Bannon has said she knows the concerns of the women who are uncomfortable with the themes of her books: "I can understand that; they weren't there. To them some of it looks negative and some of it looks depressing. Although I didn't feel that way. I always felt excited when I was writing them."

=== Gender ===
All five books of The Beebo Brinker Chronicles depict characters trying to come to terms with their ostracism from heterosexual society. Christopher Nealon adds that the characters are also trying to "understand the relationship between their bodies and their desires"; the continuing appeal of the novels, Nealon states, is due to the characters being "beautifully misembodied".

In Odd Girl Out, Laura Landon's resistance to the idea that she may be homosexual lies in her own concept of femininity rather than any repugnance for loving women. In I Am a Woman, the second book in the series, Beebo's butch appearance "seems to alternately terrify and attract Laura", leading to a very erotic physical relationship. However, when Laura lashes out at Beebo in a moment of self-pity, it is her masculinity that Laura attacks, invalidating Beebo's uniqueness and the core of her desirability violently. In the book that exhibits the most self-destruction in the series, Women in the Shadows, Laura expresses shame when accompanying Beebo outside of Greenwich Village, fearing Beebo will be arrested and jailed. Facing the end of their relationship, Beebo expresses the desire to be a man, if only to be able to marry Laura to give her a normal life.

Bannon's last book, Beebo Brinker, which takes place before the others when Beebo is eighteen years old, focuses on her realization not only that she is gay, but that she is also a masculine woman. Nealon writes that Bannon's exploration of Beebo's masculinity is not to give excuses for her desires, but "to get at the source of specialness, the sources of her claim to be treated with dignity". By connecting her characters' bodies with their desires, Bannon allows further understanding of self as normal, and that homosexuality is acceptable.

== Style ==
Bannon's books, like most pulp fiction novels, were not reviewed by newspapers or magazines when they were originally published between 1957 and 1962. However, since their release they have been the subject of analyses that offer differing opinions of Bannon's books as a reflection of the moral standards of the decade, a subtle defiance of those morals, or a combination of both. Andrea Loewenstein notes Bannon's use of cliché, suggesting that it reflected Bannon's own belief in the culturally repressive ideas of the 1950s. Conversely, writer Jeff Weinstein remarks that Bannon's "potboilers" are an expression of freedom because they address issues mainstream fiction did not in the 1950s. Instead of cliché, Weinstein writes that her characters become more realistic as she exploits the dramatic plots, because they "are influenced by the melodramatic conventions of the culture that excludes them".

Diane Hamer likens Bannon's work to the Mills and Boon of lesbian literature, but unlike conventional romance novels, her stories never really have neat and tidy conclusions. Hamer also takes note of Bannon's use of Freudian symbolism: in I Am a Woman, Jack frequently mentions that he is being psychoanalyzed, and his friends react with interest. Jack labels Laura "Mother" and continues to refer to this nickname instead of her real name throughout the series, as though Bannon—through Jack—is vaguely mocking Freud and the ideas that have framed the construction of sexuality in the 1950s. Scholar Michele Barale remarks that Bannon's literary devices in Beebo Brinker defy the expectations of the audience for whom the novel was specifically marketed: heterosexual males. Bannon chooses the first character, an "everyman" named—significantly—Jack Mann, with whom the male audience identifies, only to divulge that he is gay and has maternal instincts. His interest turns to Beebo, whom he finds "handsome" and lost, and he takes her home, gets her drunk, and becomes asexually intimate with her. Barale writes that Bannon manipulates male readers to become interested in the story, then turns them into voyeurs and imposes homosexual desires upon them, though eventually places them in a safe position to understand a gay story from a heterosexual point of view.

The erotic nature of the books has been noted as adding to their uniqueness. Loewenstein remarks on the intensity of Laura's passion: "The presentation of a woman as a joyfully aggressive person is, in itself, a rare achievement in 1957". A 2002 retrospective of Bannon's books claims "there were more explicit and nuanced representations of sexuality in those paperbacks than could be found almost anywhere else". Author Suzana Danuta Walters represents the eroticism in Bannon's books as a form of rebellion. In the Harvard Gay & Lesbian Review, Jenifer Levin writes, "Know this: Beebo lives. From the midst of a repressive era, from the pen of a very proper, scholarly, seemingly conforming wife and mother, came this astonishingly open queer figment of fictional being, like molten material from some volcano of the lesbian soul."

Bannon's books have, with the benefit of time, been described in vastly different terms, from "literary works" among pulp contemporaries, to "libidinised trash". However disparately Bannon's books are described in feminist and lesbian literary retrospectives, almost every mention concedes the significance of The Beebo Brinker Chronicles. One retrospective writer called Bannon's books "titillating trash, but indispensable reading to the nation's lesbians."

== Legacy ==
Critics have since remarked that Bannon's books are remarkable for portraying homosexual relationships relatively accurately. The continuity of characters in the series also gave her books a unique quality, especially when most lesbian characters during this time were one-dimensional stereotypes who met punishment for their desires. Bannon's characters have been called "accessibly human", and still engrossing by contemporary standards compared to being "revolutionary" when first released. LGBT historian Susan Stryker describes the relationships between Bannon's characters as mostly positive, satisfactory, and at times complex depictions of lesbian and gay relationships, which Bannon attributed to not letting go of the hope that she could "salvage (her) own life." One retrospective of lesbian pulp fiction remarked on the reasons why Bannon's books in particular were popular is because they were so different from anything else being published at the time: "Bannon was implicitly challenging the prevailing belief that homosexual life was brief, episodic, and more often than not resulted in death ... Bannon insisted on the continuity of lesbian love, while everything in her culture was speaking of its quick and ugly demise."

Bannon set her stories in and among gay bars in the 1950s and 1960s that were secret. As described in Beebo Brinker, one had to knock on the door and be recognized before being let in. In reality, women were not allowed to wear pants in some bars in New York City. Police raided bars and arrested everyone within regularly; a raid on a gay bar prompted the seminal Stonewall riots in 1969 that started the gay rights movement. Because of the atmosphere of secrecy and shame, little was recorded at the time about what it was like to be gay then, and Bannon unwittingly recorded history from her own visits to Greenwich Village. In 2007, one of the writers who adapted three of the books into a play said of Bannon's work, "I think she rises above the pulp. She wasn't trying to write trash. There wasn't any place for a woman to be writing this kind of material ... But I just think the writing's transcended its time and its era and its market."

Author Katherine V. Forrest claimed Bannon and her books "are in a class by themselves" and credits Bannon with saving her life, writing in 2005,

Overwhelming need led me to walk a gauntlet of fear up to the cash register. Fear so intense that I remember nothing more, only that I stumbled out of the store in possession of what I knew I must have, a book as necessary to me as air ... I found it when I was eighteen years old. It opened the door to my soul and told me who I was.

=== Adaptations ===
In 2007, an off-off-Broadway company named The Hourglass Group produced an adaptation of The Beebo Brinker Chronicles in a production that ran for a month. The writers, Kate Moira Ryan and Linda S. Chapman, used material from I Am a Woman, Women in the Shadows and Journey to a Woman to predominantly positive reviews. It was successful enough to be moved Off Broadway for another ten-week run in 2008. The play's writers commented on the difficulty of lesbian-themed works finding financial success. They were tempted to make it more appealing by turning to camp for comedy. However, one of the writers said, "I just felt like, how can you turn these people into a joke? I mean, these people are real people! Why would I direct a play where I held the characters in some sort of contempt or felt that they were ridiculous? We are allowed to do something else besides camp." The stage adaptation of The Beebo Brinker Chronicles was produced by Lily Tomlin and Jane Wagner, and it won the Gay and Lesbian Alliance Against Defamation (GLAAD) Media Award for "fair, accurate, and inclusive" portrayals of gay and lesbian people in New York Theater. In 2021 the Palm Springs Desert Ensemble Theatre produced the play.

In April 2008, Bannon appeared with the Seattle Women's Chorus in a performance called "Vixen Fiction". Bannon read excerpts of her work and discussed the effects of her writing on her own life and the lives of her readers. U.S. cable network HBO has optioned Bannon's novels for potential development as a series.

=== Honors ===
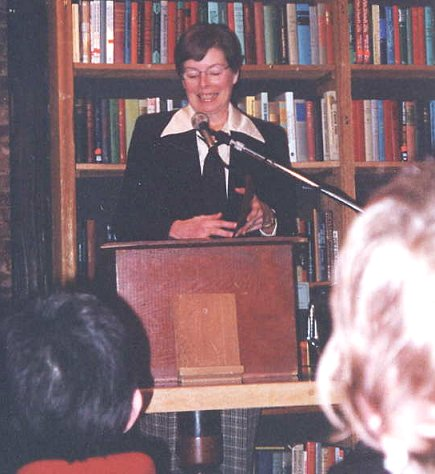
Bannon giving a presentation at the Elliott Bay Book Company in Seattle, Washington, in 2002

In 1997, Bannon's work was included in a collection of authors who had made the deepest impact on the lives and identities of gays and lesbians, titled Particular Voices: Portraits of Gay and Lesbian Writers. In 2000, the San Francisco Board of Supervisors awarded Bannon a Certificate of Honor "for breaking new ground with works like Odd Girl Out and Women in the Shadows" and for "voic (ing) lesbian experiences at a time when explicit lesbian subject matter was silenced by government and communities." In 2004, Bannon was elected into the Saints and Sinners Literary Festival Hall of Fame. She received the Sacramento State Alumni Association's Distinguished Faculty Award for 2005, and received the Trailblazer Award from the Golden Crown Literary Society the same year; the GCLS created the Ann Bannon GCLS Popular Choice Award. She was the recipient of the Alice B Award in 2008, that goes to authors whose careers have been distinguished by consistently well-written stories about lesbians. In May 2008, Bannon was given the Pioneer Award from the Lambda Literary Foundation.

In 2012, she was named by Equality Forum as one of their 31 Icons of the LGBT History Month.

=== In retirement ===
Bannon retired from teaching and college administration at California State University, Sacramento, in 1997, but tours the country visiting paperback-collecting conventions and speaking at colleges and universities about her writings and experiences. She was a guest of National Public Radio's Peabody Award-winning talk show Fresh Air with Terry Gross, and has also been featured in Gross's book, All I Did Was Ask, a collection of transcripts from the show. Bannon also speaks at gay-themed events around the country and is working on her memoirs.

In a 2002 editorial written by Bannon in Curve, she discussed how her books survived despite criticisms by censors, Victorian moralists, and purveyors of literary "snobbery" in writing, "To the persistent surprise of many of us, and of the critics who found us such an easy target years ago, the books by, of and for women found a life of their own. They—and we—may still not be regarded as conventionally acceptable 'nice' literature, as it were—but I have come to value that historical judgment. We wrote the stories no one else could tell. And in so doing, we captured a slice of life in a particular time and place that still resonates for members of our community."

== Personal life ==
Bannon lives in Sacramento. She has two children with her former husband. In 2021 she told an interviewer that her elder daughter, who converted to Catholicism and became very conservative, "does not approve of any of this at all" but that her younger daughter is "open and welcoming and loving".
