= Spring Fire =

1952 book by Marijane Meaker

- First edition Gold Medal Books cover, 1952
- Author: Vin Packer
- Cover artist: Barrye Phillips
- Language: English
- Genre: lesbian pulp fiction
- Publisher: Gold Medal Books
- Publication date: 1952
- Publication place: United States
- Media type: Print (Paperback)

Spring Fire, is a 1952 paperback novel written by Marijane Meaker, under the pseudonym "Vin Packer". It is the first lesbian paperback novel, and the beginning of the lesbian pulp fiction genre; it also addresses issues of conformity in 1950s American society. The novel tells the story of Susan "Mitch" Mitchell, an awkward, lonely freshman at a Midwestern college who falls in love with Leda, her popular but troubled sorority sister. Published by Gold Medal Books, Spring Fire sold 1.5 million copies through at least three printings.

Cleis Press re-released the book in 2004 after extensive negotiations with Meaker, who had long denied permission over her feelings about the ending. Following the exposure of their relationship, Leda is committed to a mental institution and Mitch realizes she never loved Leda. Meaker later wrote, "I still cringe when I think about it. I never wanted it republished. It was too embarrassing." Meaker explained in the 2004 foreword that Dick Carroll, her editor at Gold Medal Books, told her that because the book would be sent through the mail, no references to homosexuality as an attractive life could be portrayed or postal inspectors would send it back to the publishing house. He said that one character must acknowledge that she is not a lesbian, and the other she's involved with "must be sick or crazy".

== Background ==
The story is based on an affair Meaker had in boarding school as a teenager. She was awkward and shy in a new school and fell in love with a more experienced, older girl. They traded love letters, and the other girl's mother found them on the eve of a weekend trip they were to take together. When the girl's mother approached her, "She said she'd rather kill herself than be like me," Meaker remembered.

She initially wished to title the book Sorority Girl, but her business-minded editor changed the title to Spring Fire in order to confuse potential readers with the James A Michener title The Fires of Spring.

== Plot summary ==
Susan ("Mitch") Mitchell is pledging to the Tri Epsilon sorority at fictional Cranston University. She is seen as a boon to the sorority due to her father's significant wealth, and the sorority is promised a new silverware set from the alumni if she is accepted. Large, ungainly, and shy, she is drawn to older sorority member Leda Taylor who is direct and independent; they become roommates and have double dates—Leda with boyfriend Jake and Mitch with the sullen, boorish president of the "Sig Eps" who humiliates her during a fraternity party. Mitch flees the party after striking the fraternity president on the head and the sorority is blackballed. Much-more-experienced Leda trades her exasperation with Mitch's innocence with overt affection for her in rapid mood switches.

To avoid further exclusion, Mitch is persuaded by her sorority to invite the fraternity president to a dance at the sorority house, where he rapes her after getting her drunk. Afterwards Leda finds her stunned and calms her down by telling her how much she loves her. They begin a secret affair while Leda publicly continues dating Jake, whom she tells Mitch she rather despises, and Mitch going with relatively harmless "independents" (non-fraternity boys), which is frowned-on by the sorority leaders.

Mitch's only friend in the pledge class is kicked out of the sorority after getting home at 1 AM because her date had a flat tire. Leda tries to teach Mitch that they must put men first so they aren't disrespected, but they may love each other in private. Leda's promiscuous, alcoholic young mother visits, and Leda tries to test Mitch so she's able to answer her mother's questions about men, but Mitch is shy and reluctant to lie about her feelings. But after her mother leaves, Leda apologizes for ignoring Mitch, shows her affection again, and tries to reassure her that they aren't lesbians.

Mitch tries to sleep with her date to see if he makes her feel the way Leda does, but he is unable to perform. Convinced that she is abnormal and infectious and that Leda is a temptation, Mitch writes to Leda telling her she's leaving the sorority. Leda tries to stop her by seducing her again, but their sorority sisters enter the room and see what is happening. In an emergency meeting, Leda reads the sisters Mitch's heartfelt letter and explains that Mitch has had a crush on her and the sisters had seen Mitch attacking Leda.

While the Dean of Women interrogates Mitch, Leda gets drunk and wallows in her guilt for selling Mitch out to the sorority. When the Dean asks to see Leda, sorority members find her sobering up, but she is still not sober enough to drive and she crashes the car; in the aftermath, witnesses hear her calling out deliriously for Mitch. Her injuries are serious enough that she is hospitalized for 3 days, during which Mitch moves out of the sorority house and back into the dorm. They meet a final time when the Dean drives Mitch to visit Leda in the hospital; the tenuous confrontation leaves Leda laughing and crying simultaneously as Mitch departs. The day the sorority's new silverware set arrives, they learn that Leda has had a complete nervous breakdown and is to be institutionalized. Mitch begins new friendships as she realizes that she never really loved Leda after all.

== Impact ==
A pulp fiction novel, Spring Fire was sold in train and bus station kiosks and drug stores with other sensationalist books about crime, drugs, gangsters, and cowboys. Although it was not reviewed by any renowned literary critics, Spring Fire sold more copies in 1952 than The Postman Always Rings Twice by James M. Cain and My Cousin Rachel by Daphne du Maurier, also released the same year. When the paper in pulp novels was not designed to last more than a year, Spring Fire went through three printings, eventually selling nearly 1.5 million copies. Its success earned Meaker an invitation to meet Roger Fawcett, the owner of Gold Medal Books' parent company, who wanted to, "shake the hand of the writer who outsold God's Little Acre (Erskine Caldwell)."

Spring Fire inspired other serious writers in the lesbian pulp fiction genre such as Ann Bannon and Valerie Taylor, and indeed, proved so profitable that the genre attracted (usually male) writers whose books exploited the topic of lesbianism, launching an entire genre of fiction.

In 1989, Meaker spoke about realizing the impact the book had while she was working at Gold Medal Books: "Spring Fire was not aimed at any lesbian market, because there wasn’t any that we knew about. I was just out of college. We were amazed, floored, by the mail that poured in. That was the first time anyone was aware of the gay audience out there."

In 2004 upon the re-release of the Cleis Press edition, a reviewer noted, "Spring Fire not only plays a vital pioneering role in lesbian writing, it’s also as a warning of how difficult things could be. It’s ironic that Spring Fire was released now, when we need it the most, to remind us of the incredible courage of those who came before, the enormity of what has been accomplished, and why we must remain vigil, and treasure and protect every step forward we’ve managed to take."

== See also ==
- Lesbian fiction
