= Gold Medal Books =

American publishing company, imprint of Fawcett Publications

- Parent company: Fawcett Publications
- Status: Defunct
- Founded: 1950
- Country of origin: United States
- Headquarters location: New York City
- Publication types: Paperback books

Gold Medal Books, launched by Fawcett Publications in 1950, was an American book publisher known for introducing paperback originals, a publishing innovation at the time. Fawcett was also an independent newsstand distributor, and in 1949 the company negotiated a contract with New American Library to distribute their Mentor and Signet titles. This contract prohibited Fawcett from publishing their own paperback reprints.

Roscoe Kent Fawcett wanted to establish a line of Fawcett paperbacks, and he felt original paperbacks would not be a violation of the contract. In order to test a loophole in the contract, Fawcett published two anthologies — The Best of True Magazine and What Today's Woman Should Know About Marriage and Sex — reprinting material from Fawcett magazines not previously published in books. When these books successfully sailed through the contract loophole, Fawcett announced Gold Medal Books, their line of paperback originals. Fawcett's editor-in-chief was Ralph Daigh, who had been hired by Captain Billy in 1928, and the art director for Gold Medal was Al Allard, who also had been with Fawcett since 1928.

Gold Medal's first editor was Jim Bishop, a former Collier's editor later known for his series of best-selling non-fiction titles: The Day Lincoln Was Shot, The Day Christ Died and The Day Kennedy Was Shot. When Bishop left after a year, he was replaced by William Charles Lengel (1888–1965), a veteran magazine editor, agent, short story author and novelist (Forever and Ever, Candles in the Wind). In February 1951, former Hollywood story editor Richard Carroll signed on as an editor with Gold Medal. Carroll was once described as "the Maxwell Perkins of Gold Medal."

Another early Gold Medal editor was former literary agent Knox Burger, who recalled, "Through its Gold Medal series, Fawcett was able to give many now well-known authors a chance at book publication early in their careers – among them John D. MacDonald and Kurt Vonnegut. It also gave established writers like William Goldman and MacKinlay Kantor a chance to flex their creative muscles under pseudonyms."

Radcliffe graduate Rona Jaffe, who joined the company in the early 1950s as a file clerk, was promoted to an associate editor position. After four years at Fawcett, she left to pursue a writing career. Her best-selling 1958 novel, The Best of Everything, obviously drawn from her experiences at Fawcett and Gold Medal, was adapted for a 1959 film and a 1970 TV series. At the time of Jaffe's departure from Fawcett in 1955, the new associate editor who stepped in was Leona Nevler, formerly with Little, Brown but best known in 1950s publishing circles as the person who saw the potential of Grace Metalious' best-selling Peyton Place after picking it from the slush pile at publisher Julian Messner. During her 26 years at Fawcett, Nevler became the editorial director in 1972.

Beginning their numbering system at 101, Gold Medal got underway with Alan Hynd's We Are the Public Enemies, the anthology Man Story (102) and John Flagg's The Persian Cat (103). Writing about the demise of pulp magazines in The Dime Detectives, Ron Goulart observed, "Fawcett dealt another blow to the pulps when, in 1950, it introduced its Gold Medal line. What Gold Medal specialized in was original novels. Some were merely sleazy, but others were in a tough, hard-boiled style that seemed somehow more knowing and more contemporary than that of the surviving pulps. Early Gold Medal authors included John D. MacDonald, Charles Williams and Richard S. Prather." Others were Benjamin Appel, Bruno Fischer, David Goodis, Day Keene, Dan J. Marlowe, Wade Miller, Jim Thompson, Lionel White, Harry Whittington and Marijane Meaker (under the pseudonym of "Vin Packer").

Interviewed by Ed Gorman in 1984, MacDonald recalled, "In late 1949, I wrote a long pulp novelette. My agent, Joe Shaw, asked me to expand it. I resisted, but complied. I hate puffing things. Cutting is fine. Everything can use cutting. But puffing creates fat. Gold Medal took it for their new line of originals. It was titled The Brass Cupcake." Numbered as Gold Medal 124, The Brass Cupcake was John D. MacDonald's first novel.

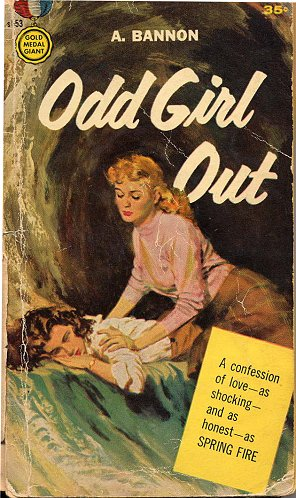
Cover artwork for Odd Girl Out (1957) by Ann Bannon

Gold Medal 129 was an unusual graphic novel experiment, John Millard's Mansion of Evil, an original color comic book story packaged as a paperback. Other 1950 Gold Medal originals included the Western Stretch Dawson by William R. Burnett and three mystery-adventure novels – Nude in Mink by Sax Rohmer, I'll Find You by Richard Himmel. Also the first lesbian pulp novel Women's Barracks by Tereska Torrès (later to be followed by Marijane Meaker's Spring Fire and Ann Bannon's Beebo Brinker Chronicles). After Donald E. Keyhoe's article "Flying Saucers Are Real" in True (January 1950) created a sold-out sensation, with True going back to press for another print run, Keyhoe expanded the article into a top-selling paperback, The Flying Saucers Are Real, published by Fawcett that same year.

Sales soared, prompting Ralph Daigh to comment, "In the past six months we have produced 9,020,645 books, and people seem to like them very well." However, hardcover publishers resented Roscoe Fawcett's innovation, as evidenced by Doubleday's LeBaron R. Barker, who claimed that paperback originals could "undermine the whole structure of publishing."

With an increase from 35 titles in 1950 to 66 titles in 1951, Gold Medal's obvious success in issuing paperback originals revolutionized the industry. While MacDonald, Williams, Prather, Louis L'Amour, Richard Matheson, Bruno Fischer, and MacKinlay Kantor were joining Gold Medal's roster of writers, other paperback publishers were soon asking agents for original manuscripts. Literary agent Donald MacCampbell stated that one publisher "threatened to boycott my agency if it continued to negotiate contracts with original 25-cent firms."

Prather had a bank account of $100 when his wife handed him a telegram from literary agent Scott Meredith on July 7, 1950 indicating his first sale. Although Prather's first novel was unsold, Gold Medal liked his second novel and his Shell Scott character enough to offer a four-book contract, and Prather's Case of the Vanishing Beauty soon set sales records.

In 1950, Bruno Fischer's House of Flesh sold 1,800,212 copies. In 1951, Charles Williams' Hill Girl sold 1,226,890 copies, Gil Brewer's 13 French Street sold 1,200,365 and Cassidy's Girl by David Goodis sold 1,036,497. Authors were attracted to Gold Medal because royalties were based on print runs rather than actual sales, and they received the entire royalty instead of a 50–50 split with a hardback publisher. Gold Medal paid a $2000 advance on an initial print run was for 200,000 copies. When a print run increased to 300,000, the advance was $3000.

Mickey Spillane's I, the Jury paperback bestseller got a huge boost from Fawcett, as Spillane explained to interviewer Michael Carlson:

Now at that time you had to go through hardback. So I wrote I, the Jury and turned it in to E. P. Dutton. It had been rejected by four different publishers, saying no, no, this is too violent, too dirty ... and it was picked up by Roscoe Fawcett, Fawcett Publications. He was a distributor, doing comic books, but he saw the potential, and he went to New American Library, which was Signet Books, and he said "If you print this book, I'll distribute it." Now they can't get distribution, so it's a win-win thing for them, but they have to get it published in hardback, so they go to Dutton and say if you print this, we'll do the paperback. So now it's win-win-win, and they offer me $250, and I say no, I need a thousand dollars to build a house in Newburgh, so I get a $1,000 advance, which was unheard of. So Roscoe ordered a million copies, and that was unheard of! So somebody in his outfit says, oh, that wasn't what he meant, he must've meant a quarter million. So they bring out a quarter of a million at the wrong time, cause books sell great at Christmas time, but my book came out between Christmas and New Year, which is death, and it went straight to the top, because it was word of mouth, and it's sold out, and Fawcett says get the rest of them out, and the guy says there aren't any more and Roscoe says whaddaya mean, I ordered a million, and a guy got fired!

In 1952, when their contract with NAL expired, Fawcett immediately began doing reprints through several imprints. Red Seal started April 1952 and published 22 titles before it folded a year later. Launched September 1955, Premier Books offered non-fiction titles, such as The Art of Thinking by Ernest Dimnet. Crest Books, which also premiered in September 1955, spanned all genres with an emphasis on Westerns and humor, including Best Cartoons from True and Lester Grady's Best from Captain Billy's Whiz Bang, and one successful Crest title was their movie tie-in edition of Robert Bloch's Psycho. Fawcett Crest was perhaps best known for their many abridged collections issued during the 1960s and 1970s of the Peanuts comic strip titles originally published by Holt, Rinehart and Winston. The managing editor of Fawcett Crest and Premier was Leona Nevler.

Between 1960 and 1993, Gold Medal was the exclusive American publisher of Donald Hamilton's Matt Helm spy novel series. In the early 1960s, John D. MacDonald's Travis McGee series got underway after Knox Burger contacted MacDonald: "At the request of Knox Burger, then at Fawcett, I attempted a series character. I took three shots at it to get one book with a character I could stay with. That was in 1964. Once I had the first McGee book, The Deep Blue Good-by, they held it up until I had finished two more, Nightmare in Pink and A Purple Place for Dying, then released one a month for three months. That launched the series."

After his retirement in 1972, Daigh recalled, "From our entrance into the paperback business, we paid authors at a more generous rate than had been the custom. In 1955, when we started the Crest line to reprint hardcover books, we extended this practice to what we offered for softcover rights. It caused quite a sensation in the trade when we paid $101,505 for James Gould Cozzens' By Love Possessed and later $700,000 for James A. Michener's The Source. Giving the author a bigger share of the pie paid off handsomely. However, I gather that the practice has been overdone in recent years and has led to some of the book industry's current troubles."
