= Cleis Press =

American independent publisher of books

- Parent company: Start Publishing
- Founded: 1980
- Founder: Frédérique Delacoste; Felice Newman; Mary Winfrey Trautmann
- Country of origin: United States
- Headquarters location: Jersey City, New Jersey
- Distribution: Books International and Simon & Schuster
- Publication types: Books
- Fiction genres: Erotica, romance, lgbt, collection & anthologies, fiction, nonfiction, sexual health, sexual education
- Official website: www.cleispress.com

Cleis Press is an American independent publisher of books in the areas of sexuality, erotica, feminism, gay and lesbian studies, gender studies, fiction, and human rights. The press was founded in 1980 in Minneapolis, Minnesota. It later moved to San Francisco and was based out of Berkeley until its purchase by Start Media in 2014. Its founders were Frédérique Delacoste, Felice Newman and Mary Winfrey Trautmann, who collectively financed, wrote and published the press's first book Fight Back: Feminist Resistance to Male Violence in 1981. In 1987, they published Sex Work: Writings by Women in the Sex Industry by Delacoste with Priscilla Alexander.

== History ==
Over the years, Cleis Press has published nonfiction books by Susie Bright, Annie Sprinkle, Edmund White, Essex Hemphill, Gore Vidal, Christine Jorgensen, Matthue Roth, Patrick Califia, Violet Blue, Mark A. Michaels and Patricia Johnson and Tristan Taormino, among others. Fiction published by Cleis Press includes works by Achy Obejas, Stephen Elliott, Erastes (author), reissues of classic lesbian pulp fiction (including Ann Bannon's historic Beebo Brinker series), the Nancy Clue series by Mabel Maney, Virginia Woolf's first completed novel, Melymbrosia, and an English-language novel set in North Korea, Jia by Hyejin Kim. Other Cleis Press authors are Lori Bryant-Woolridge, Cole Riley, Mitzi Szereto, Neil Plakcy, Radclyffe, James Lear, and Richard Labonté. Cleis Press' erotic anthologies have included work from well known story writers Sacchi Green, Shanna Germain, Jeremy Edwards, Michelle Augello-Page, Charlotte Stein, ADR Forte, and Teresa Noelle Roberts.

Cleis Press produces many erotica collections and self-help sex guides, including The Ultimate Guide to Fellatio, The Whole Lesbian Sex Book, and The Good Vibrations Guide to Sex. Some of their collections include Best Gay Asian Erotica, Best Bisexual Women's Erotica, and Best Lesbian Bondage Erotica, and annual anthologies titled Best Gay Erotica, Best Lesbian Erotica, and Best Women's Erotica. In winter of 2010, they began of yearly anthology of bondage erotica, starting with Best Bondage Erotica 2011. Cleis Press also publishes a wide variety of other thematic collections, including Rachel Kramer Bussel's Please, Ma'am: Erotic Stories of Male Submission, Caught Looking: Erotic Tales of Voyeurs and Exhibitionists, Alison Tyler's Frenzy: 60 Stories of Sudden Sex, Mitzi Szereto's multiple-genre anthologies and Kristina Wright's genre-themed erotic romance anthologies and Best Erotic Romance series.

In 2000, Cleis Press founded Midnight Editions, a human rights imprint that aims to present fiction, nonfiction, and photojournalism from regions where repression and censorship are endangering creative expression. Midnight Editions published The Little School: Tales of Disappearance and Survival in Argentina, a 1986 memoir by former political prisoner and Amnesty International board member Alicia Partnoy, as well as The Diary of a Political Idiot: Normal Life in Belgrade by Jasmina Tešanović.

Cleis Press has also published a number of books on transgender issues, including Patrick Califia's Sex Changes: Transgender Politics and Loren Cameron's Body Alchemy: Transsexual Portraits. More recently, they also published The Transgender Child: A Handbook for Families and Professionals, by Stephanie Brill and Rachel Pepper, a guidebook for the friends and families of transgender and gender-nonconforming children, which addresses significant social, legal, and medical issues.

The press has been the recipient of many awards, including the Firecracker Alternative Book Award for Outstanding Independent Press twice (in 1997 and 1999), and several Lambda Literary Awards in 2010.

In 2014, Cleis, along with the imprints Viva Editions and Tempted Romance, was purchased by Start Publishing, the book division of Start Media. The staff members of Cleis departed shortly after the transition. Cleis is currently run by Start Publishing in Jersey City, NJ.

As of May 2026, the publisher's online outposts did not show any releases since 2025.
