= Mikael Levin =

American photographer and filmmaker (born 1954)

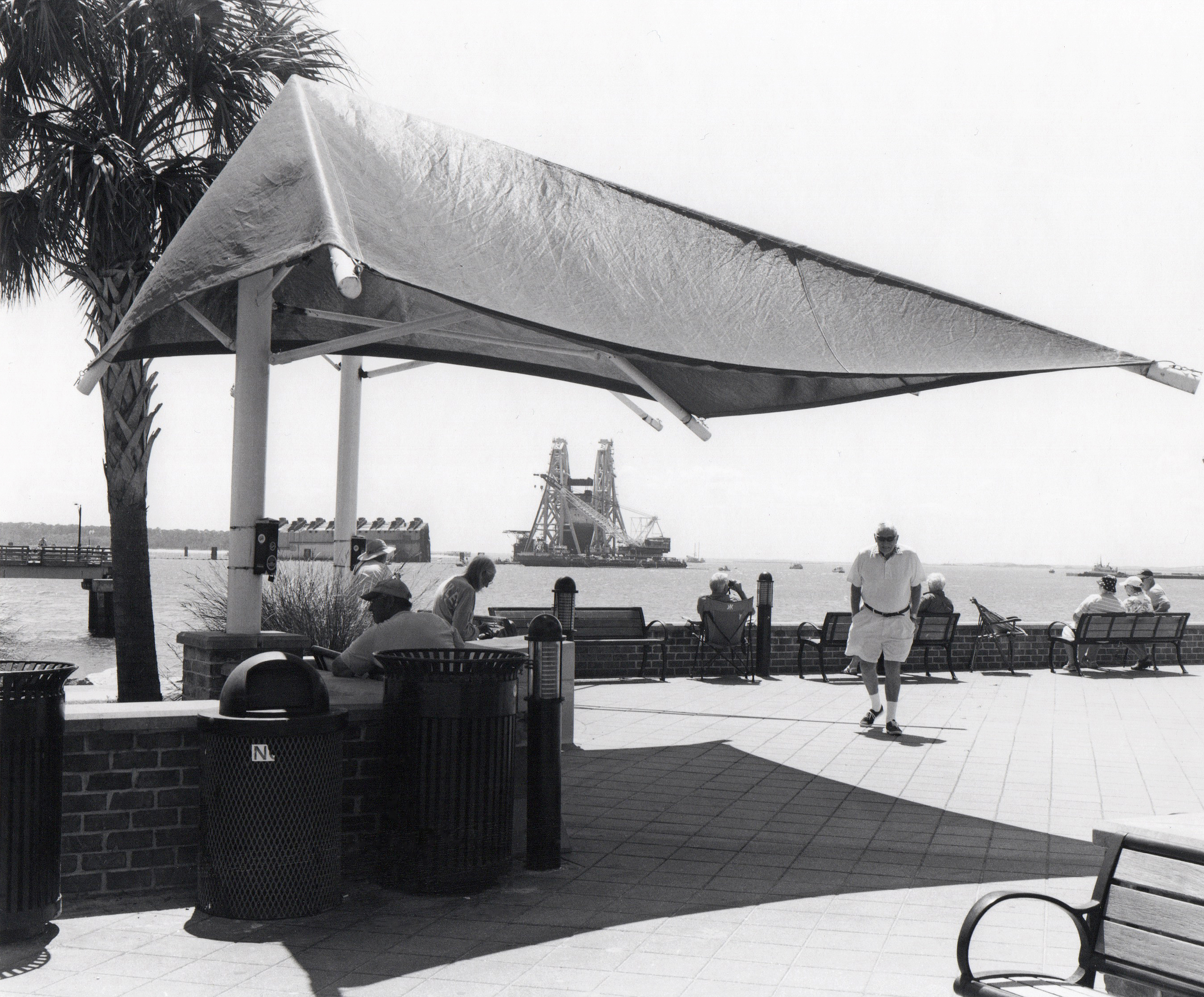
Saint Simons Island, Georgia. 2021. Igbo Landing Mass Suicide, 1803. Gelatin silver print. 17 x 21 inches.

Mikael Levin (born 1954) is an American artist who explores in his work our conceptions of place, identity, and temporarily

Levin was the recipient of a Guggenheim Fellowship in 2025 and has been exhibited widely in the US and in Europe, including solo exhibitions at the Jewish Museum, Paris, 2010, the Berardo Collection Museum, Lisbon, 2009, the Bibliothèque nationale de France, Paris, 2003, the International Center of Photography, New York, 1997, and Fundación Mendoza, Caracas, 1980. His work was included in the Venice Biennale in 2003.

== Biography ==
Mikael Levin is the son of American novelist Meyer Levin and French novelist Tereska Torrès. His grandfather was the Ecole de Paris artist Marek Szwarc. His older brother Gabriel Levin is a Jerusalem-based poet and translator.[3] While growing up, Mikael and his family split their time between New York, Paris, and Israel. Levin is currently based on Long Island, New York.

== Artistic career ==
The sequence of four projects described below, which stretch over some 30 years, are an example of the way Mikael Levin's work situates everyday scenes within the greater forces of our times, using photography’s observational qualities and unique temporality to take a longer view of the present. Levin''s photographs turn our awareness to how memory and identity intersect with place and time.

In 1993, as the European Union started removing border controls between member states, Levin set out to mark the optimism of the era by photographing the newly decommissioned border crossings. French-American, he envisioned that European border-lines would soon be no more noticeable than state lines in the US. Levin recorded the various structures that constituted the border: control booths, customs houses, barriers, signage, also the in-between spaces, and related businesses such as cafes, hotels, currency exchanges, and duty-free shops. The resulting selection of 90 photographs was presented in five large, hand-made albums. These were purchased and exhibited by the Bibliothèque nationale de France in a solo exhibition in 2003.

Photographing borders in 1993 brought Mikael Levin to thinking of his father’s frequent crossings of those same borders at the close of the Second World War, when, as an American war correspondent, Meyer Levin followed the Allied advance into Germany. In War Story (1996), Mikael Levin used his father’s autobiography, In Search, to retrace his father’s journey, photographing the sites his father described as he found them 50 years later. Setting out from Paris, Meyer Levin had followed the Allied advance eastward. As the journey progressed he encountered the concentration camps, the liberation of which he witnessed first hand. The camps became the central focus of Meyer Levin’s reporting.

Accompanying Meyer Levin on their 1944-1945 journey was the French photographer Éric Schwab. Schwab’s photographs, presumed lost, were located by Mikael Levin while researching War Story. Incorporating them into his project, Levin’s journey 50 years later became not only one of comparing written descriptions to present-day scenes, but also of re-photographing sites photographed by Schwab. Levin has described War Story as an investigation of how photographs layer time over place. There was also a more personal level to this project; what Meyer Levin witnessed scarred him for the rest of his life. This project was a way for Mikael Levin to come to understand how those experiences had impacted his father.

War Story was sponsored by the Fritz Bauer Institute in Frankfurt, Germany, with support from DZ Bank (Frankfurt). It was exhibited extensively in the following years, first as the featured exhibition of Kunstfest Weimar in 1996, and then in such places as the International Center of Photography in New York (1997), Deutsches Filmmuseum (Frankfurt 1997), Haus am Kliestpark (Berlin, 1998), and Archives Nationales (Paris, 2003). Large selections from War Story are in the collections of the Jewish Museum in Berlin, Whitney Museum and the International Center of Photography. Amongst a number of books that discuss this project, Spectral Evidence, by Ulrich Baer, stands out for two chapters that discuss Levin’s work.

While involved with War Story Levin became preoccupied with trying to understand how a horror such as the Holocaust could have possibly come about. Many historians have linked colonial practices and modernity as antecedents of the Holocaust. From his readings on this subject emerged his next project Notes from the Periphery (2003).

In Notes from the Periphery (2003), which was presented in Venice Biennale of 2003, Levin presented three series of photographs, each done in a place linked to the Atlantic slave trade, and each focusing on an attribute of modernity’s conception of identity. His point was to draw attention to how modernity’s positivist idea of individual and social identity emerged hand in hand with the global commerce in human flesh, a system that brought some 12 million enslaved people to work and die the New World.

His research on Notes from the Periphery led Levin to his next project, looking into the story of a branch of his family that had settled in Guinea-Bissau, further south along the coast of Africa. He realized that this family’s migration story over three generations encapsulated the turbulent eras of industrialization, colonialism, and post-colonialism; that it was a typical story of the struggles for betterment, and ultimately the defeated hopes, of the 20th century. It was also important to him as a modern Jewish story that atypically bypassed Zionism. The project he developed around this story, Cristina’s History (2007), consists of images made in the places where his relatives lived—in Poland, Portugal and Guinea-Bissau—accompanied by brief narratives situating their lives within the larger historical context of their time.

Cristina’s History was first exhibited at Le Point du Jour, in Cherbourg, France in 2009. Later that same year the project was exhibited at the Berardo Collection Museum in Lisbon, and in 2010 it was shown at the Jewish Museum in Paris], where Levin was awarded the museum’s Prix Maratier. The complete set of images from the project was purchased in 2012 by the Fonds national d'art contemporain (France).

In 2019 Levin started on Critical Places; 15 Sites of American Slave Rebellion, a project about how the rebellions of the enslaved are remembered (or not remembered) in the landscape. Through his experience of those places, as witnessed in his photographs, he marks them as critical places in a topography of historical consciousness, bringing forward how he see these rebellions still echoing in social patterns and economic structures. A series of exhibitions in venues associated with those rebellions followed, including at the South Slave Cabin Gallery of the Melrose, in Natchez, Mississippi,which was proximate to the Second Creek uprising that took place at Cherry Grove Plantation in 1861. Other venues included the Boydern Gallery of Saint Mary’s College of Maryland, and the School of International and Public Affairs, Columbia University, New York.
