= Laserson =

Laserson is a surname. Notable people with the surname include:

- Kayla Laserson, American epidemiologist
- Miriam Laserson (1919–2021), Russian-American actress, poet, and writer
