= Koretz (surname) =

Koretz is a surname. Notable people with the surname include:

- Leo Koretz (1879–1925), American lawyer and stockbroker
- Paul Koretz (born 1955), American politician
- Zvi Koretz (1884–1945), Greek rabbi
