= Lorna Thorpe =

American epidemiologist

Lorna E. Thorpe
- Education: University of Michigan; University of Illinois Chicago
- Scientific career
- Workplaces: NYU Langone Health; CUNY Graduate School of Public Health and Health Policy; New York City Department of Health and Mental Hygiene; Centers for Disease Control and Prevention
- Thesis: Effects of drug use patterns and behaviors on bloodborne pathogens (2000)

Lorna E. Thorpe is an American epidemiologist. She is the Anita and Joseph Steckler Professor and the chair of the Department of Population Health at the NYU Grossman School of Medicine at NYU Langone Health. She serves on the board of the American College of Epidemiology.

== Early life and education ==
Thorpe was an undergraduate student at the Johns Hopkins University. Thorpe earned a masters of public health at the University of Michigan. After graduating, she moved to China, where she worked on family planning and the HIV/AIDS program. Thorpe moved to the University of Illinois Chicago for her doctoral research, where she studied the impact of drug use on blood borne pathogens. She was a medical fellow in epidemiology at the Centers for Disease Control and Prevention where she focused on epidemic intelligence, working in the international tuberculosis control.

== Research and career ==
Thorpe started her academic career at New York City Department of Health and Mental Hygiene, where she served as deputy commissioner on epidemiology. In this capacity she oversaw the growth of the epidemiology division, and invested in initiatives to better understand the needs of New York City residents. After nine years at the health department she moved to the CUNY Graduate School of Public Health and Health Policy where she was made chair of the Department of Epidemiology, and co-director of the New York University–City University of New York Prevention Research Center, where she worked with the Centers for Disease Control and Prevention on reducing disparities in cardiovascular disease.

Thorpe joined NYU Langone Health in 2016. She specializes in population health surveillance and the relationship between epidemiology and public policy. Her research has considered hypertension, environmental exposure and the impact of the September 11 attacks on public health. Her research showed that neighbourhoods in the United States with easily accessible fast food outlets were linked to higher rates of Type 2 diabetes. Furthermore, still in correlation with environmental exposure, Lorna recently published a study with other scholars revolving around PFAS and its distribution.

== Selected publications ==
- Thorpe, Lorna; Lawrence J Ouellet; Ronald Hershow; Susan L Bailey; Ian T Williams; John Williamson; Edgar R Monterroso; Richard S Garfein (2002). "Risk of hepatitis C virus infection among young adult injection drug users who share injection equipment". American Journal of Epidemiology. 155 (7): 645–653. doi:10.1093/aje/155.7.645. PMID 11914192. Wikidata Q45733180.
- Vaira Leimane; Vija Riekstina; Timothy H Holtz; Evija Zarovska; Vija Skripconoka; Thorpe, Lorna; Kayla F Laserson; Charles D Wells (2005). "Clinical outcome of individualised treatment of multidrug-resistant tuberculosis in Latvia: a retrospective cohort study". The Lancet. 365 (9456): 318–26. doi:10.1016/s0140-6736(05)17786-1. PMID 15664227. Wikidata Q28303675.
- Thorpe, Lorna; Deborah G List; Terry Marx; Linda May; Steven D Helgerson; Frieden, Tom (2004). "Childhood obesity in New York City elementary school students". American Journal of Public Health. 94 (9): 1496–1500. doi:10.2105/ajph.94.9.1496. PMC 1448480. PMID 15333301. Wikidata Q51937966.
- Cantor, M. N., & Thorpe, L. (2018). Integrating Data On Social Determinants Of Health Into Electronic Health Records. Health affairs (Project Hope), 37(4), 585–590. https://doi.org/10.1377/hlthaff.2017.1252
- Yi, H., So, C., Flores, T.A. et al. Evaluating the geographic distribution of rural PFAS contamination and potential dietary sources of exposure. npj Emerg. Contam. 2, 36 (2026). https://doi.org/10.1038/s44454-026-00055-z
