= Boaz Levin =

Berlin based curator (born 1989)

Boaz M. Levin (Hebrew: בועז לוין; born 1989 in Jerusalem) is a Berlin-based writer, curator and filmmaker. His curatorial work deals with histories of ecology and technology and the ways these have influenced visual culture. "Mining Photography: The ecological Footprint of Image Production" curated together with Esther Ruelfs, and (2023) and "Image Ecology" curated together with Kathrin Schönegg (2024), as well as his essay "The Pencil of Cheap Nature: Towards an Environemtal History of Photography" have become key references in the discourse around the ecology of image production. Since October 2023, he has served as Co-Head of Program and curator at C/O Berlin, where he co-curated exhibitions such as "Valie Export . Retrospective"; "Studio Rex, the Jean-Marie Donat collection"; "Träum Weiter – Berlin, the 90er," and Dörte Eißfeldt . Archipelago. In 2022, Levin was co-curator of the 3rd Chennai Photo Biennale. In 2017, he was co-curator together with Florian Ebner, Kerstin Meinicke, Kathrin Schonegg, and Christin Müller of the 7th edition of the Biennale für aktuelle Fotografie, which takes place in Mannheim, Ludwigshafen and Heidelberg. He is an editor of Cabinet Magazine's Kiosk. His essay, "On Distance", was published by Atlas Projectos, Berlin (ed. Laura Preston), as part of the Next Spring series of occasional reviews. His writing has been published by magazines such as Camera Austria, Texte Zur Künst, and Frieze. He is an AICA, and DGPh member, and has been an ICOM member. Levin has curated exhibitions at the Martin-Gropius-Bau, Heidelberger Kunstverein, The Jewish Museum Munich, and Kunstraum Kreuzberg/Bethanien, the Museum für Kunst und Gewerbe, Hamburg, KunstHausWien, and C/O Berlin, among other venues. Levin is the co-founder, together with Vera Tollmann and Hito Steyerl, of the Research Center for Proxy Politics. Levin has served as both nominator and jury member for numerous prizes and fellowships, including the DAAD film Film Residency Award, Hamburger Bahnhof's inaugural Studio Award, and the C/O Berlin's After Nature Ulrike Crespo Photography Prize.

== Life and education ==
Levin is the son of poet and translator Gabriel Levin and Anat Flug-Levin, a psychoanalyst. He is the grandson of Dorota and Noach Flug, and Tereska Torrès and Meyer Levin. He studied in at Bezalel Academy of Arts and Design, and then at Berlin University of the Arts where he graduated as Meisterschüler from the class of Hito Steyerl in 2014. Since October 2016, Levin is a PhD candidate and member of the "Cultures of Critique" research training group at the Leuphana University, Lüneburg.

== Work ==
Levin's work deals with the relationship between politics, aesthetics, technology and ecology. His work has been exhibited at the CCA (Tel-Aviv), Former West, HKW (Berlin), Recontres Internationales (Paris, Berlin), FIDMarseille (Marseille), European Media Arts Festival (Osnäbruck), Human Resources (Los Angeles) The School of Kyiv (Kyiv biennial), La Gaîté Lyrique (Paris), Auto Italia South East (London), Years (Copenhagen) and Dinca Vision quest (Chicago).

Regarding Spectatorship: revolt and the distant observer, a curatorial research project co-curated together with Marianna Liosi, was shown at Kunstraum Kreuzberg/Bethanien November 2015.

All That Is Solid Melts Into Data (2015, 54 min), co-directed with Ryan S. Jeffery, premiered in FIDMarseille. All That is Solid Melts into Data "traces the architectural development of data centers, those curiously mammoth, often inaccessible glass-and-concrete "anti-monuments" that facilitate the ever-quickening communication we modern-day citizens take for granted. The film builds two simultaneous and equally compelling pictures of the USA — through its physical landscapes (frequently windowless, in-plain-sight complexes relocated to increasingly remote locales), and through the more troubling sociopolitical undercurrents that actively shape its digital economy". The film has been described as a "clinical dissection of the material effects of data (and by inference, the internet) on the future conditions of the city." The production of the film was supported by the Ostrovsky Family Fund.

Levin was the curator of "Say Shibboleth! On Visible and Invisible Borders", an exhibition by the Jewish Museums in Hohenems (Austria), and Munich (Germany).

Levin worked as a curatorial advisor and co-editor of the catalog and board-game for "Mine," an exhibition by New Zealand born, Berlin-based artist Simon Denny, which opened at MONA, Tasmania in 2019, and later traveled to K21, Düsseldorf.

In 2020, Levin was the curator of "BPA at Gropius Studios", a series of artist presentations in collaboration between the Martin-Gropius-Bau, and Berlin Program for Artists, which facilitates exchange between emerging and experienced Berlin-based artists, through coordinated studio visits and meetings. Levin has given workshops and seminars in numerous art-schools and universities, including Goldsmiths, University of London, HFBK, Hamburg, UDK, Berlin, and Shenkar College, Ramat Gan.

== Research Center for Proxy Politics ==
Between September 2014 and August 2017, the Research Center for Proxy Politics (RCPP), hosted over twenty talks and workshops for students and the public on the evolving concept of "proxy politics". Founded by Vera Tollman, Hito Steyerl and Boaz Levin, RCPP "reflects upon the nature of medial networks and their actors, that is, machines and things as well as humans." According to RCPP, "proxies are now emblematic of a post-representational political age, one increasingly populated by bot militias, puppet states, ghostwriters, and communication relays". Levin and Tollmann have argued that "proxies are fundamentally ambivalent, and our current politics engages proxies at all levels".

== Awards ==
Last Person Shooter (2014), co-directed together with Adam Kaplan, was awarded the Ostrovsky Family Foundation Award for Experimental Cinema and Video Art in the 32nd Jerusalem Film Festival, 2015.

== Books ==
- RCPP (Boaz Levin and Vera Tollmann) ed. The Proxy and its Politics (Berlin: Archive Books, 2017) ISBN 9780648022688
- Co-editor, Extractor, Board Game and Catalog accompanying Simon Denny's exhibition, MINE, MONA, Australia. ISBN 9780648022688
- Boaz Levin and Vera Tollmann (RCPP), “A single swing of the shovel”, Former West: Art and the Contemporary After 1989, ed. Maria Hlavajova, Simon Sheikh, MIT Press 2017. ISBN 9780262533836
- Boaz Levin, "Resisting Images", Farewell Photography. Ed. Christin Müller and Florian Ebner. Verlag Walther König, 2017. ISBN 9783960982050, ISBN 3960982054
- On Distance, ed. Laura Preston, Berlin: Atlas Projectos, 2020. ISBN 9789895473427
- Wendy Hui Kyong Chun, Boaz Levin and Vera Tollmann, "Proxies" in: Uncertain Archives: Critical Keywords for Big Data, ed. Nanna Bonder Thulstrup, Daniela Agostinho, Annie Ring, Catherine D'Ignacio and Kristin Veel, The MIT Press, 2021
- Boaz Levin, Esther Ruelfs and Tulga Beyerle, eds., Mining Photography: The Ecological Footprint of Image Production (Leipzig: Spector Books, 2022). ISBN 9783959056328
- Boaz Levin and Kathrin Schönegg, eds., Image Ecology (Leipzig: Spector Books, 2023) ISBN 9783959057660

== Writing ==
- https://www.skulptur-projekte.de/#/En/Publications/Publications/380/Out-of-Body "The Body of the Web", Boaz Levin and Vera Tollmann (RCPP) for Skulptur Projekte Münster 2017 in frieze d/e (2016).
- Boaz Levin and Vera Tollmann, "Plunge Into Proxy Politics", Springerin (2015)
- Boaz Levin and Ryan S. Jeffery, Lost in The Cloud, for Spheres Journal, Leuphana University, Lüneburg.
- Boaz Levin, ALLES, essay in artist book by Tobias Zielony, Étude books, Paris.
- Boaz Levin, Nothing Consoles You Like Despair, an essay on the work of Richard Frater, Contemporary Hum
- On the Shores of Inequality / Boaz Levin on “Ground Zero” at Schinkel Pavillon, Berlin, Texte Zur Kunst Issue No. 117.
