= Compulsion (1959 film) =

1959 film directed by Richard Fleischer

- Theatrical release poster
- Directed by: Richard Fleischer
- Screenplay by: Richard Murphy
- Based on: Compulsion (1956 novel) by Meyer Levin
- Produced by: Richard D. Zanuck
- Starring: Orson Welles; Diane Varsi; Dean Stockwell; Bradford Dillman; E. G. Marshall; Martin Milner
- Cinematography: William C. Mellor
- Edited by: William H. Reynolds
- Music by: Lionel Newman
- Production company: Darryl F. Zanuck Productions
- Distributed by: 20th Century-Fox
- Release date: April 1, 1959
- Running time: 103 minutes
- Country: United States
- Language: English
- Budget: $1,345,000
- Box office: $1.8 million (est. US/ Canada rentals)

Compulsion is a 1959 American crime drama film directed by Richard Fleischer, based on the 1956 novel by Meyer Levin, which in turn is a thinly fictionalized account of the Leopold and Loeb murder trial. The film stars Dean Stockwell and Bradford Dillman as the perpetrators (called Judd Steiner and Artie Straus in the film), and Orson Welles as their defense attorney Jonathan Wilk (based on Clarence Darrow). Diane Varsi, E. G. Marshall, and Martin Milner play supporting roles.

The film was released by 20th Century-Fox on April 1, 1959. It received positive reviews from critics, who singled out the lead performances. At the 1959 Cannes Film Festival, the film was nominated for the Palme d'Or and Welles, Stockwell, and Dillman collectively won the Best Actor Award.

== Plot ==
Close friends Judd Steiner (Note: Based on Nathan Leopold) and Artie Straus (Note: Based on Richard Loeb) each believe they fit Friedrich Nietzsche's philosophy of a "superman" (Übermensch), and thus are above the law. From wealthy, socially prominent families, both are graduate law students under age 20 at the University of Chicago (Artie tells investigators that he began undergraduate studies at the University of Michigan at age 14). Both believe themselves able to outsmart the "inferior" persons surrounding them.

Challenging Professor McKinnon's classroom lecture on "tribal codes," Judd asserts that Nietzsche claimed tribal leaders did not feel compelled to obey the laws they set:

McKinnon (in disagreement): "Did Moses consider himself above the laws that he laid?"

Judd: "He had a motley crew on his hands, and he had to get them through the desert somehow."

Sid Brooks, a classmate earning his way through college working at a newspaper, expresses wonder at Judd's interactions with the esteemed professor:

Sid: "Every time I stick my neck out, he chops my head off. You get away with murder. How come?"

Judd: "I don't know, he just doesn't seem to think very fast."

Sid: "He's supposed to be one of the brightest men in the faculty."

Judd: "I suppose he is."

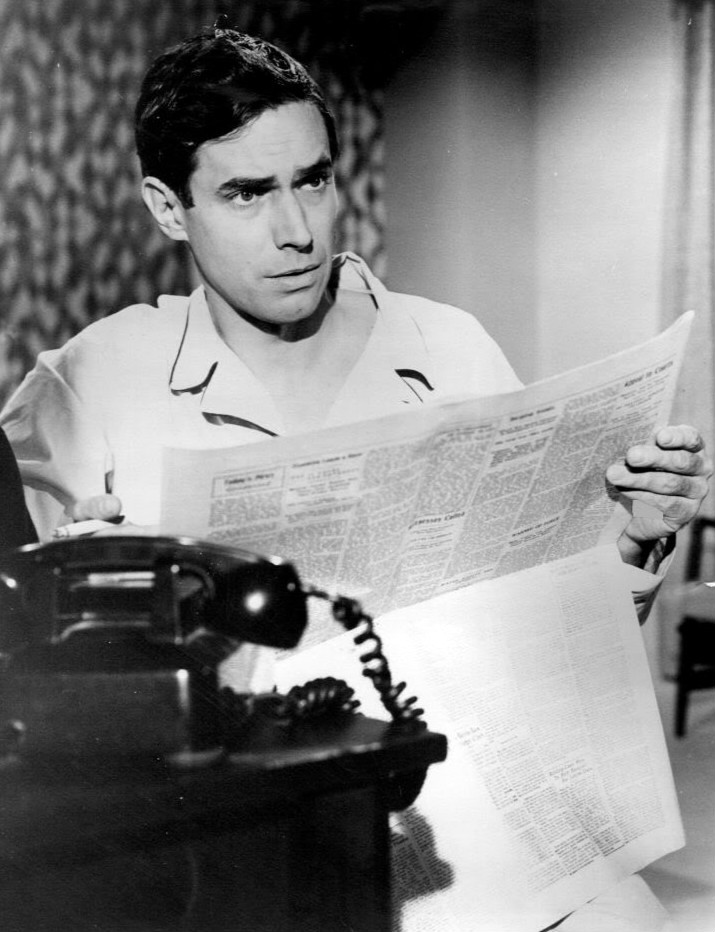
Bradford Dillman plays Artie Straus, the dominant of the two friends who believe they fit Nietzsche's philosophy of a "superman" (Übermensch), thus are above the law.

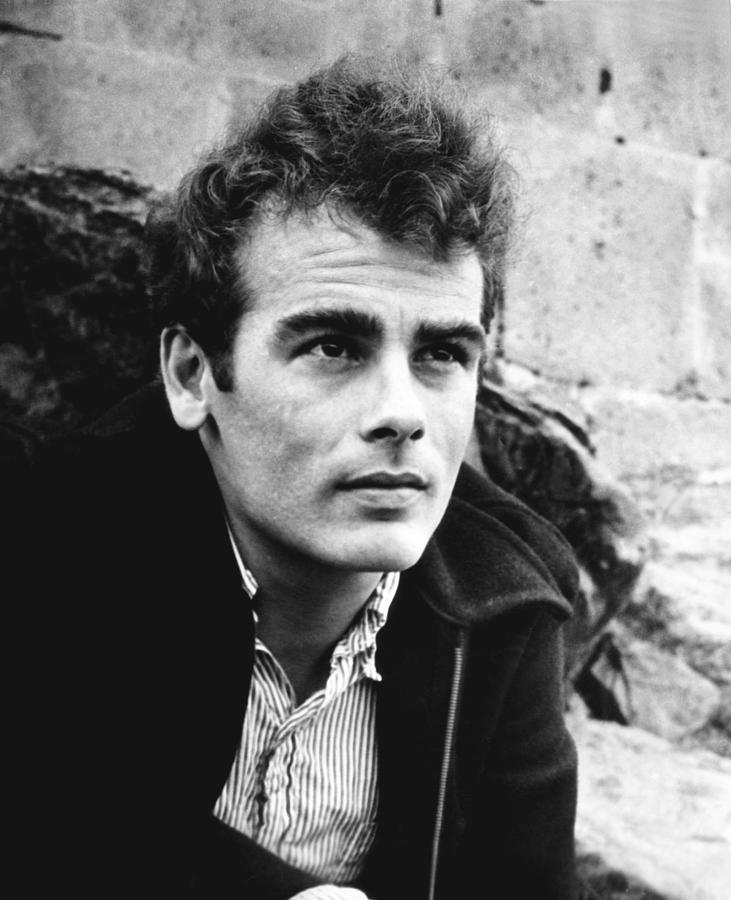
Dean Stockwell plays Judd Steiner, the submissive personality who goes along with Artie's increasingly criminal commands.

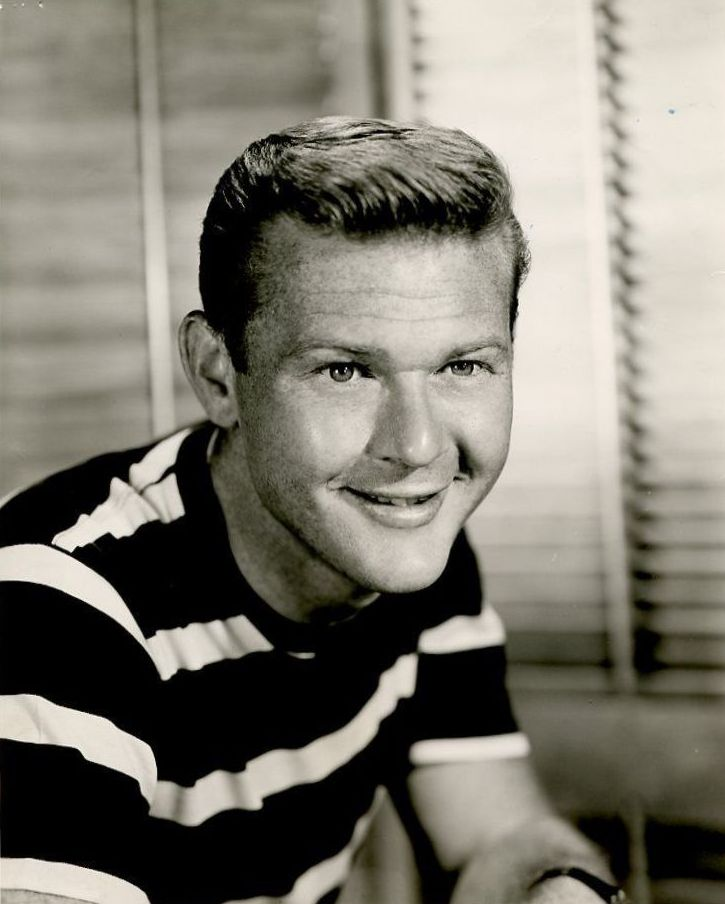
Martin Milner plays Sid Brooks, a classmate of Steiner and Straus's, a reporter who discovers the eyeglasses found near Paulie's body, assumed to be his, are too large to be Paulie's and are key evidence.

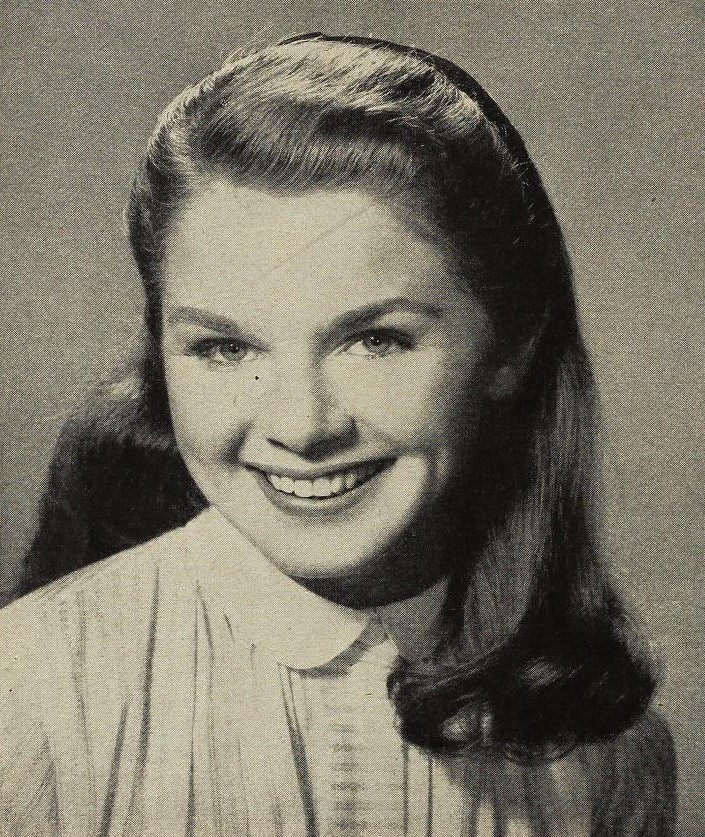
Diane Varsi plays Ruth Evans, Sid Brooks's girlfriend who feels sympathy for Judd Steiner despite his having almost assaulted her.

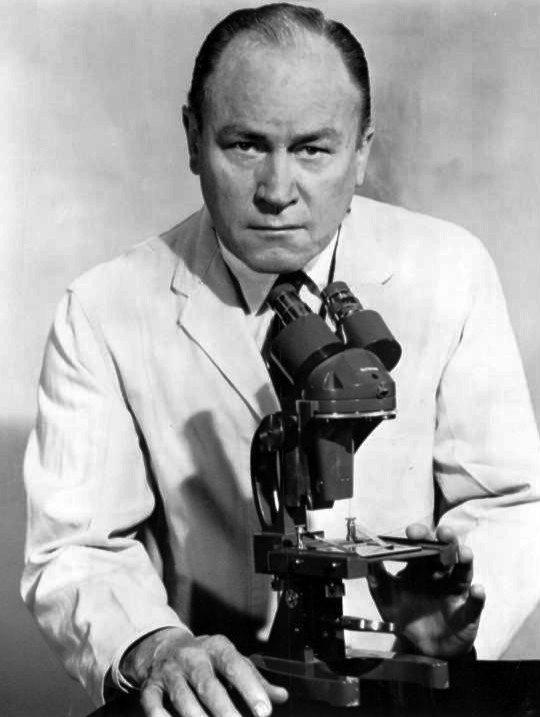
E.G. Marshall plays District Attorney Harold Horn, whose intensive interrogation of Steiner and Straus for hours results in their confessions.

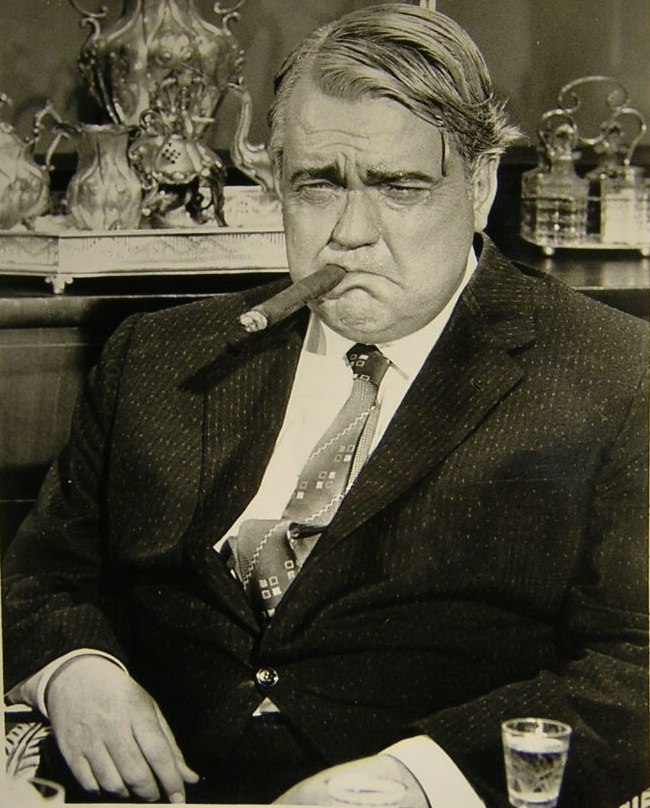
Orson Welles plays Jonathan Wilk, who saves Steiner and Straus from hanging by making an impassioned closing argument against capital punishment.

To please Artie, to whom Judd is submissive, Judd goes along with Artie's increasingly criminal commands, such as stealing $67 and a typewriter from a campus fraternity house. When Artie commands Judd to run over with his car a hitchhiking drunk they have run off the road, Judd loses resolve and narrowly misses the drunk. Artie berates Judd for his lack of conviction, which proves he is not superior. To restore himself in Artie's regard, Judd proposes to demonstrate their "superior intellect" by killing a boy, demanding a ransom, and outwitting the police. Cruising in their car for a victim, they lure Paulie Kessler, a neighbor on his way home from school, and kill him. Artie believes they have committed the "perfect crime." When police question Paulie's neighbors, a cocky Artie "helpfully" engages with the investigators, spitefully giving them false leads. Asked about suspicious characters around the neighborhood; among others, Artie suggests a teacher at Paulie's school, which Judd and he had attended four years previously, who always told the kids they were spoiled brats who had too much money.

When assigned a beat about a drowned boy who was found in the park, Sid discovers the eyeglasses found near Paulie's body, assumed to be his, are too large to be Paulie's and are key evidence. The glasses have a distinctive hinge, with only three pairs purchased in the Chicago area, Judd having purchased one pair. Judd, whose glasses dropped out of his pocket at the scene of the crime, is unable to produce his. Questioned, Judd claims he dropped them a few days earlier when bird-watching with his group of ornithology students. It now becomes urgent to dump the typewriter stolen from the fraternity house that they used to type the ransom note sent to the Kesslers.

Needing to give each other alibis, Judd and Artie claim to have been out the evening of the murder with girls they picked up named May and Edna, whose full names they never learned. The alibi falls apart when the Steiner chauffeur unintentionally reveals he was working on repairs to Judd's car the entire evening that Judd and Artie claimed to be cruising in it with the girls (they had rented a car that could not be traced to them for the crime, but their alibi involved riding around in Judd's car). Eventually, the "superior" Artie cracks under interrogation and implicates Judd, who then confirms the details of Artie's confession, but insists that Artie committed the actual murder.

Famed attorney Jonathan Wilk (Note: Based on Clarence Darrow) takes their case, saving them from hanging by making an impassioned closing argument against capital punishment. Steiner and Straus are given life sentences, instead.

== Cast ==
- Orson Welles as Jonathan Wilk (based on Clarence Darrow)
- Diane Varsi as Ruth Evans
- Dean Stockwell as Judd Steiner (Nathan Leopold)
- Bradford Dillman as Artie Straus (Richard Loeb)
- E.G. Marshall as District Attorney Harold Horn (Robert E. Crowe)
- Martin Milner as Sid Brooks
- Richard Anderson as Max Steiner
- Robert F. Simon as Police Lt. Johnson
- Edward Binns as Tom Daly
- Robert Burton as Charles Straus
- Wilton Graff as Mr. Steiner
- Louise Lorimer as Mrs. Straus
- Gavin MacLeod as Padua

Uncredited

- Terry Becker as Benson
- Russ Bender as Edgar Llewellyn
- Peter Brocco as Albert
- Alan Carney as Globe Newspaper Editor
- Harry Carter as Detective Davis
- Wendell Holmes as Jonas Kessler
- Jack Raine as Professor McKinnon

== Production ==
Orson Welles, whose recent thriller Touch of Evil was overlooked in America (though appreciated in Europe), was bitter at not being selected to direct Compulsion. His time on the set was tense, and he threw frequent tantrums. Bradford Dillman, who played the character based on Dickie Loeb, recalled his experience with Orson Welles: "Although Orson was helpful to me on Compulsion, he was not overly friendly. Welles was not a gregarious person. We didn't have sessions in which we sat around and talked of all the great movies he had done and all the people he had worked with. Orson didn't talk to the other actors. He never talked about the plot, he never talked about the script. He was the last person called on the set. Everything would be rehearsed. You learned to be very wary in a scene that you didn't step on his lines or anything like that."

In the early 1950s, Meyer Levin visited Nathan Leopold in prison and requested that Leopold cooperate with him on writing a novel based on the murder (the other murderer, Richard Loeb, was dead by that time). Leopold declined, saying he did not wish his story told in fictionalized form, but asked Levin if he could help him write his memoir. Levin was unhappy with that suggestion and wrote the novel anyway, releasing it in 1956. The novel was called Compulsion, the book on which the film is based. Leopold read the book and reportedly did not like it. Leopold later wrote that reading the book made him "physically sick .... More than once, I had to lay the book down and wait for the nausea to subside. I felt as I suppose a man would feel if he were exposed stark-naked under a strong spotlight before a large audience."

In 1959, Leopold sought unsuccessfully to block production of the film on the grounds that Levin's book had invaded his privacy, defamed him, profited from his life story, and "intermingled fact and fiction to such an extent that they were indistinguishable." Eventually, the Illinois Supreme Court ruled against him, noting that Leopold, as the confessed perpetrator of the "crime of the century", could not reasonably demonstrate that Levin's book had damaged his reputation.

== Reception ==
=== Critical response ===
In The New York Times, A. H. Weiler gave the film a positive review, especially praising the performances of the actors: "In Compulsion, they have made a dark deed into a bright and fascinating picture." The film holds a critics' approval rate of 100% on Rotten Tomatoes.

=== Awards and nominations ===
Institution	Year	Category	Nominee(s)	Result	Ref.
British Academy Film Awards	1960	Best Film	Richard Fleischer	Nominated	
Cannes Film Festival	1959	Palme d'Or	Richard Fleischer	Nominated	
Cannes Film Festival	1959	Best Actor	Orson Welles, Dean Stockwell, Bradford Dillman	Won	
Directors Guild of America	1960	Outstanding Directorial Achievement in Theatrical Feature Film	Richard Fleischer	Nominated	
Writers Guild of America	1960	Best Written American Drama	Richard Murphy	Nominated	

== Related works ==
Compulsion was one of four films Richard Fleischer directed that dramatized real-life murder cases. The others were The Girl in the Red Velvet Swing (1955), based on the 1906 murder case involving model and actress Evelyn Nesbit; The Boston Strangler (1968), based on the Boston Strangler case and Albert DeSalvo; and 10 Rillington Place (1971), based on John Christie and Timothy Evans.

== See also ==
- Leopold and Loeb
- Rope, Alfred Hitchcock's 1948 film based on the 1929 play by Patrick Hamilton, also inspired by the murder.
- List of American films of 1959
- Murder by Numbers, 2002 film directed by Barbet Schroeder
