= Thrill Me =

Musical by Stephen Dolginoff

- The Leopold & Loeb Story
- Dolginoff (left) as Leopold; Kreeger as Loeb
- Music: Stephen Dolginoff
- Lyrics: Stephen Dolginoff
- Book: Stephen Dolginoff
- Basis: Leopold and Loeb murder
- Productions: 2003 Midtown Int'l Theater Festival; 2005 Off-Broadway, various regional

Thrill Me: The Leopold & Loeb Story is a musical with a book, music, and lyrics by Stephen Dolginoff. It is based on the true story of Nathan Leopold and Richard Loeb, the so-called "thrill killers" who murdered a young boy in 1924 in order to commit "the perfect crime." The story is told in flashbacks, beginning with a 1958 parole hearing.

The show premiered with a small production at the 2003 Midtown International Theater Festival in New York City. It was then staged as a larger Off-Broadway production in 2005 by the York Theatre Company in association with Jim Kierstead. Since then, Thrill Me was published in the United States by Dramatists Play Service, and in the UK by Samuel French Ltd. recorded on CD by Original Cast Records, and has been staged in a variety of US and international cities.

In 2024, writer/composer Stephen Dolginoff's memoir Thrill Maker, which recounts the entire thirty-year history of the show (which he first began writing in 1994), was published.

== Production history ==
The original production at New York City's 2003 Midtown International Theatre Festival was directed by Martin Charnin. It was then staged for a limited run off-Broadway by the not-for-profit York Theatre Company (James Morgan, Producing Artistic Director) and Jim Kierstead, opening on May 16, 2005, and extended through August 21. Directed by Michael Rupert, the production featured author Stephen Dolginoff as Leopold and Doug Kreeger as Loeb. Stephen Bogardus, John McMartin, and Rupert himself were heard in voice-overs. Shonn Wiley replaced Kreeger late in the run. Matt Bauer opened in the role of Leopold.

The musical has had hundreds of productions in numerous countries and languages; and has been performed at regional theatres throughout the U.S., with Dolginoff appearing as Leopold in productions staged in Seattle, and Buffalo. Internationally, the musical has been produced in Seoul, South Korea (in Korean), Athens, Greece (in Greek), Melbourne, Australia, Tokyo, Japan (in Japanese), Madrid, Spain (in Spanish), Datteln, Germany (in German) Belgium (in Dutch), England, Scotland, Austria, Canada, Argentina, China, the Czech Republic, and Poland.

A recording with Kreeger and Dolginoff was released by Original Cast Records in April 2006.

A major Los Angeles production featured Alex Schemmer and Stewart W. Calhoun at the Hudson Backstage Theatre.

A new professional production opened in February 2010 at the Seymour Centre in Sydney, Australia. The production featured Benjamin Giraud as Leopold, Blake Erickson as Loeb as well as the voices of Jason Langley, Jennifer Vuletic, and Barry Crocker.

A London production featuring Jye Frasca and George Maguire as Leopold & Loeb along with the voices of Patricia Quinn, Lee Mead, and Les Dennis opened in April 2011 at the Tristan Bates Theatre and transferred to the West End's Charing Cross Theatre in May 2011 for a 4-week limited engagement. A revival at the Greenwich Theatre took place in April, 2015 prior to a UK Tour; followed by a production in 2017 which played London and the Edinburgh Fringe Festival.

The Canadian premiere was presented by Fighting Chance Productions in Vancouver, BC. Directed by Ryan Mooney with music direction by Alison Dalton it featured Michael Gill and Braedon Cox who were nominated for Ovation Awards for their performances as well as winning Theatre BC awards for Best Lead Males. The show ran at the Shop Theatre in November 2012.

A subsequent Canadian production was presented by Capricorn 9 Productions. Produced and directed by Larry Westlake at the intimate Red Sandcastle Theatre in Toronto, it ran a limited engagement from July 12 to 26, 2013.

In 2017, Stephen Dolginoff and Doug Kreeger reprised their original roles of Nathan Leopold and Richard Loeb in a special revival of Thrill Me.

In 2019, The Hope Theatre staged Thrill Me for their 10th in-house production. Rachael Ryan was nominated for the 2020 Offie Best Set Design. Bart Lambert (Nathan) and Jack Reitman (Richard) received the Offie for Best Male Performance in a Musical. This production transferred to the Jermyn Street Theatre in January and February 2022, with Lambert and Reitman reprising their roles.

== Plot summary ==
It is 1958 at Joliet Prison, Illinois, where Nathan "Babe" Leopold faces the Parole Board for the fifth time. He tells them the facts of the "crime of the century" that sent him to prison thirty-five years earlier ("Why"). But this time he reveals more than ever, hoping it will lead to his release. In his memory, he goes back to 1924 Chicago, where, as a nineteen-year-old, he anxiously meets up with Richard Loeb, a classmate with whom he has shared friendship, sex and participation in minor crimes. Richard, who has been away at college, treats Nathan indifferently. Nathan begs to renew their relationship before separating again after the summer to attend different law schools ("Everybody Wants Richard"). Richard relents and allows Nathan to join in his activity for the evening – setting an abandoned warehouse on fire. In front of the blaze ("Nothing Like a Fire"), which arouses Richard, Nathan finally gets what he wants.

The next day, Nathan implores Richard, who is voraciously reading Nietzsche, to stop the criminal activity. Instead Richard, now empowered by the theory of the Superman, threatens to drop Nathan completely unless they create "A Written Contract" detailing that Richard will satisfy Nathan's sexual needs only in exchange for Nathan's expertise as his accomplice in petty crimes. Reluctantly, Nathan agrees. They sign in blood and their crime spree continues until Richard fails to live up to his end of the agreement ("Thrill Me"). Richard explains that he is bored with the misdemeanors and wants to commit a "superior" crime: the murder of a young boy ("The Plan") and a phony ransom scheme after the killing. Richard insists that their intellect and meticulous plotting will prevent them from being caught. Nathan has no choice but to agree or risk Richard's wrath.

Back in 1958 at Joliet before the Parole Board, Nathan explains his feelings ("Way Too Far") as he recalls how Richard prepared the murder weapons and supplies: rope, a crowbar and a bottle of acid. Richard lures the victim by promising a ride in his "Roadster". While cleaning up the murder scene, Richard extols the virtues of being "Superior" to a shaken Nathan. Back at Richard's house they compose the bogus "Ransom Note" and proceed with their plans. The next day, the newspapers reveal that, despite their careful planning, the body has been found. As a few more days go by, Nathan's missing eyeglasses are discovered near the scene of the crime. While Nathan panics, Richard tries to calm him ("My Glasses/Just Lay Low") over the phone. When the glasses are eventually traced to Nathan, Richard helps him concoct an emergency alibi and coaches him in how to answer the cops ("I'm Trying to Think"). After Nathan is successful with the police, Richard declares their relationship over so he can protect his future as a lawyer. He reminds Nathan that everything would have been fine if the glasses had not been dropped. Feeling betrayed, Nathan cuts a deal with prosecutors, turning in Richard in exchange for a lighter sentence.

When arrested, Richard realizes there is no way out and works his charms on Nathan ("Keep Your Deal With Me") by convincing him to give up the deal and accept the same punishment. While awaiting the penalty trial in his jail cell, Richard unaware Nathan can hear his muttering to himself that he is truly "Afraid" despite his strong façade. Thanks to the cunning strategies of their lawyer, Clarence Darrow, they escape the death penalty and are sentenced to prison. Behind bars, Nathan finally reveals his own shocking plan: fearing the loss of Richard, he went along with the murder but stayed one step ahead the entire time, even deliberately planting his glasses, knowing that all this would ensure his desire to be together forever, or at least for "Life Plus 99 Years". Now that the whole truth has finally been exposed, back at Joliet prison Nathan is granted parole. It is a bittersweet victory; since Richard was murdered by another inmate years before, Nathan must face the outside world alone ("Finale").

== Song list ==
- Prelude
- Why- Nathan
- Everybody Wants Richard- Nathan
- Nothing Like a Fire- Richard and Nathan
- A Written Contract- Richard and Nathan
- Thrill Me- Nathan and Richard
- The Plan- Richard and Nathan
- Way Too Far- Nathan
- Roadster- Richard
- Superior- Nathan and Richard
- Ransom Note- Richard and Nathan
- My Glasses/Just Lay Low- Nathan and Richard
- I'm Trying to Think- Richard and Nathan
- Way Too Far (reprise)- Nathan
- Keep Your Deal With Me- Richard and Nathan
- Afraid- Richard
- Life Plus 99 Years/Finale- Nathan and Richard

== Critical reception ==
The piece garnered some very positive reviews. At Musicals101.com, John Kenrick observed, "With its two character format and intimate physical production, Thrill Me looks and feels like a chamber opera, but the music is very much in a contemporary musical theatre idiom. It is damned hard to make such material sing, but Stephen Dolginoff succeeds brilliantly. His sparing use of humor in this piece is unusually effective, as is his refusal to stoop to titillation or true crime story clichés." The New York Times wrote, "The story is familiar, the script and lyrics are not especially innovative, but somehow... Dolginoff's pocket musical about the Leopold and Loeb murder case lands like a well-placed punch, arresting and a bit breathtaking.... Credit [the] lean approach to the storytelling.... Others have told the tale in plays and films, but there is something brazenly satisfying about Mr. Dolginoff's rendition.... [It]'s a reminder that evil often looks and sounds beautiful." The Hollywood Reporter said "Stephen Dolginoff has created a dark little entertainment told in flashbacks that combines the extravagant emotions and ensemble couplings of verismo opera (complete with feverish kisses and embraces) with musical sounds and styles drawn from Broadway and the bittersweet ballads of Franz Schubert and Kurt Weill". The Los Angeles Times wrote "A hit off-Broadway, Stephen Dolginoff's two-character musical Thrill Me delves into the distinctive pathology of the youths' relationship, a homosexual attraction that devolved into a master-slave dynamic of deadly proportions. Now in its Los Angeles premiere at the Hudson Backstage, Thrill Me proves a propitious debut for the Havok Theatre Company.

== Awards and nominations ==
Year	Award	Category	Nominee	Result
2005	ASCAP Music Award			Won
2006	Drama Desk Awards	Best Musical		Nominated
2006	Drama Desk Awards	Best Musical Score		Nominated
2006	Outer Critics Circle Award	Best Off-Broadway Musical		Nominated
2008	Los Angeles Ovation Award	Best Musical-Intimate Theatre		Nominated
2008	Los Angeles Ovation Award	Best Lighting Design - Intimate Theatre	Steven Young	Nominated
2009	Los Angeles Garland Award	Best Music & Lyrics		Honorable Mention
2011	The Offies	Best New Musical		Nominated
2012	WhatsOnStage Awards	Best Off-West End Production		Nominated
2020	Offie	Best Set Design	Rachael Ryan	Nominated
2020	Offie	Best Male Performance in a Musical	Bart Lambert and Jack Reitman	Won
