= Compulsion (Levin novel) =

1956 crime novel by Meyer Levin

- First US edition
- Author: Meyer Levin
- Language: English
- Genre: Crime
- Publisher: Simon & Schuster (US); Frederick Muller Ltd (UK)
- Publication date: 1956
- Publication place: United States
- Media type: Print

Compulsion is a 1956 crime novel by American writer Meyer Levin. Set in 1924 Chicago, it is inspired by the real-life Leopold and Loeb trial, and was a best seller. Two college students kidnap and kill a boy to prove they can get away with the perfect crime. The following year it was adapted by Levin into a stage play of the same title, which premiered at the Ambassador Theatre on Broadway and ran for 140 performances between October 24, 1957, and February 24, 1958. The lead roles were played by Dean Stockwell and Roddy McDowall.

== Plot summary ==
The narrator, Sid Silver, is on his way to interview Judd Steiner, whose parole is being considered after serving a 30-year sentence for the thrill killing of 12-year-old Paulie Kessler. Judd Steiner and his cohort Artie Straus were sentenced to life plus 99 years for the infamous murder that was covered extensively by newspapers worldwide. As a university classmate of Judd and Artie's, earning his way through college working at a newspaper, Sid Silver had been pivotal in finding incriminating evidence in the case. Sid now wonders whether his interview of Judd may affect his upcoming parole hearing. Artie Straus had been killed by an inmate years prior.

In flashback to the time of the murder, close friends Judd Steiner and Artie Straus each believe they fit Nietzsche’s philosophy of a “superman” (Übermensch), thus are above the law. From wealthy, socially prominent families, both are brilliant graduate law students, under age 20, who indulge in petty crimes for the thrill of it. To please Artie, to whom Judd is submissive, Judd goes along with Artie's increasingly criminal demands, such as cheating at cards, smashing store windows, stealing cash and a typewriter from a fraternity house, setting fires, stealing cars, and flirting with an auto hit-and-run killing. Both believe themselves able to outsmart the “inferior” persons surrounding them. They have a pact where Judd indulges Artie's criminal demands in exchange for Artie's sexual indulgence.

To demonstrate their "superior intellect" and convinced that laws do not apply to them, Artie and Judd decide to commit the “perfect crime” for the thrill of knowing the solution while the victim's family, reporters, and police try to solve the kidnapping and murder. Cruising in their car for a victim, they lure Paulie Kessler, on his way home from school, and kill him. A neighbor of the Kesslers', a cocky Artie “helpfully” engages with reporters and investigators, spitefully giving them false theories and leads. Asked about suspicious teachers at Paulie Kessler's school—which Judd and he had attended four years previously—Artie maliciously suggests a suspected teacher had made sexual advances to his younger brother.

When assigned a beat about a drowned boy that was found in the park, Sid Silver discovers the eyeglasses found near Paulie's body, assumed to be his, are too large to be Paulie's and are key evidence. The glasses have a distinctive hinge, with only three pairs purchased in the Chicago area, Judd having purchased one pair. Judd, whose glasses dropped out of his pocket at the scene of the crime, is unable to produce his. Questioned, Judd claims he dropped them a few days earlier when bird watching with his group of ornithology students. It now becomes urgent to dump the typewriter stolen from the fraternity house that they used to type the ransom note sent to the Kesslers.

Judd befriends Sid's girlfriend, Ruth, to whom he is attracted for her intellectual capabilities. Eager to prove his ability to commit crimes independent of Artie, Judd attempts to rape Ruth, citing his Nietzschean philosophy, which she refutes. Sensing Judd's ambivalence and vulnerability, Ruth forgives the attempt and continues to see Judd, confessing to Sid her attraction to Judd's intellect and wounded psyche.

Giving each other alibis when Judd is linked to the typewriter used on the ransom note, Judd and Artie claim to have been out the evening of the murder with girls they picked up named May and Edna whose full names they do not know. They had rented a car that couldn't be traced to them for the crime, but their alibi involved riding around in Judd's car. The alibi falls apart when the Steiner chauffeur unintentionally reveals that he was working on repairs to Judd's car the entire evening that Judd and Artie claimed to be cruising in it with the girls. Eventually, the “superior” Artie cracks under interrogation and implicates Judd, who then confirms the details of Artie's confession but insists that Artie committed the actual murder. The glasses and recovered typewriter are eventually two key pieces of evidence linking Artie and Judd to the crime.

Famed attorney Jonathan Wilk takes their case, saving them from hanging by making an impassioned closing argument against capital punishment.

== Film adaptation ==
In 1959, the novel was made into the film Compulsion by Hollywood studio 20th Century Fox. Directed by Richard Fleischer it starred Orson Welles, Diane Varsi and Bradford Dillman with Stockwell reviving his role from the stage play.

== Literary significance ==
In 1956, Meyer Levin wrote the novel Compulsion, inspired by the Leopold and Loeb case. For the novel, Levin was given a Special Edgar Award by the Mystery Writers of America in 1957. Compulsion was "the first 'documentary' or 'non-fiction novel' ("a style later used in Truman Capote's In Cold Blood and Norman Mailer's The Executioner's Song").

== Controversy ==
In the early 1950s, Meyer Levin visited Nathan Leopold in prison and requested that Leopold cooperate with him on writing a novel based on the murder (the other murderer, Richard Loeb, was killed by a prison inmate in 1936). Leopold declined saying he did not wish his story told in fictionalized form but asked Levin if he could help him write his memoir. Levin was unhappy with that suggestion and wrote a novel, Compulsion, anyway, releasing it in 1956. Leopold read the book and reportedly did not like it.

In 1959, Leopold sought unsuccessfully to block production of the film Compulsion on the grounds that Levin's book had invaded his privacy, defamed him, profited from his life story, and "intermingled fact and fiction to such an extent that they were indistinguishable." Eventually the Illinois Supreme Court ruled against him, noting that Leopold, as the confessed perpetrator of the "crime of the century" could not reasonably demonstrate that Levin's book had damaged his reputation.

== Reception: Nathan Leopold's comments ==
In his autobiography, Life Plus 99 Years (the sentence handed down to Leopold and Loeb after their infamous trial), Nathan Leopold, depicted in the novel Compulsion as Judd Steiner, made the following comments about the Meyer Levin work:

"Compulsion is a horrible, a fascinating, and a beautiful book--beautiful in the sense that the iridescent surface of a swamp is beautiful. It is perhaps 40 per cent fact, 60 per cent fiction. The factual part--the details of the crime, the police hunt for the criminals, the highlights of the trial--are amazingly accurate. They show clearly the results of an enormous amount of painstaking research into the court records and the newspapers of the time...

"But when Mr. Levin leaves the cold, printed record he leaves much else behind. The rest of the book, as Mr. Levin himself warns the reader, is pure fiction--pure moonshine, that is."

"The insidious, devasting thing about the book, as I see it, is Mr. Levin's consummate artistry. He has taken a large amount of fact, and to it has added an even larger amount of fiction--of pure balderdash. And he has done it in such superbly artistic fashion that the seams don't show. No general reader can possibly know what is true and what contrived. I confess that I, on several occasions, had to stop and think hard to be sure whether certain details were true or imaginary. That's what hurts! That's what I felt diminished my own hopes of release. [Leopold believed that publication of Compulsion delayed his eventual parole. Meyer Levin later testified to the parole board that he believed Leopold deserved parole after serving 33 years in prison.] Mr. Levin accuses Judd Steiner of felonies I never dreamed of committing. He puts into Judd's mouth and very brain words and thoughts that never were in mine. Some make me blush; some make me want to weep. My God, what I did is horrible enough and the load of guilt I bear on my conscience is already heavy enough without this additional source of turmoil."

"The impact of Compulsion on my mental state was terrific. It made me physically sick--I mean it literally. More than once I had to lay the book down and wait for the nausea to subside. Emotionally, it caused me terrific shame and induced what I guess the doctors would call a mild melancholia. I felt as I suppose a man would feel if he were exposed stark-naked under a strong spotlight before a large audience. I kept to myself as much as possible. Every stranger I eyed with the unspoken question in my mind: Wonder if he's read it."

== Design ==
The dust jacket for the hardcover edition of the book was designed by Paul Bacon.

== Bibliography ==
- Niemi, Robert (2006). History in the Media: Film and Television. ABC-CLIO.
