= Leopold and Loeb =

American kidnapper-murderer duo

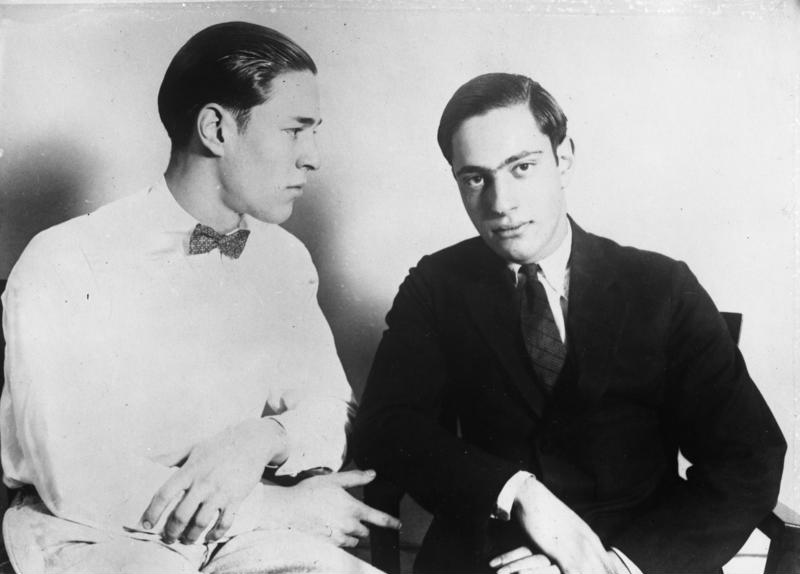
- Leopold (right) and Loeb in August 1924
- Criminal charges: Murder, kidnapping
- Penalty: Life + 99 years' imprisonment
- Nathan Leopold
- Born: Nathan Freudenthal Leopold Jr. November 19, 1904; Chicago, Illinois, U.S.
- Died: August 29, 1971 (aged 66); Puerto Rico, US
- Education: University of Michigan; University of Chicago (PhB)
- Richard Loeb
- Born: Richard Albert Loeb; June 11, 1905; Chicago, Illinois, U.S.
- Died: January 28, 1936 (aged 30); Joliet, Illinois, U.S.
- Cause of death: Homicide (from 58 inflicted wounds from a razor attack)
- Education: University of Chicago; University of Michigan (AB)

Nathan Freudenthal Leopold Jr. (November 19, 1904 – August 29, 1971) and Richard Albert Loeb (/ˈloʊb/; June 11, 1905 – January 28, 1936), together known as Leopold and Loeb, were two American murderers who kidnapped and killed 14-year-old Bobby Franks in Chicago, Illinois, United States, on May 21, 1924.

Leopold and Loeb, both of whom were students at the University of Chicago, were respectively ages 19 and 18 years, and were engaged in a same-sex relationship at the time of their crime. They committed the murder hoping to demonstrate their superior intellect, which they believed enabled and entitled them to carry out a "perfect crime" without consequences. The murder and subsequent trial received intense and sensational coverage in the press.

Leopold's and Loeb's families retained Clarence Darrow as lead counsel for their defense. Darrow's eight-hour summation at their sentencing hearing is noted for its influential criticism of capital punishment as retributive rather than transformative justice. Both men were sentenced to life imprisonment plus 99 years. Loeb was murdered by a fellow prisoner in 1936. Leopold was released on parole in 1958.

The case has since served as the inspiration for several dramatic works. Notable films that depict two murderous young men in an intense relationship include Rope (1948), Scream (1996), Funny Games (1997) and Murder by Numbers (2002).

== Early lives ==
=== Nathan Leopold ===
Nathan Freudenthal Leopold Jr. was born on November 19, 1904, in Chicago, Illinois, the third son of Florence (née Foreman) and Nathan Leopold Sr., a wealthy German-Jewish immigrant family. A child prodigy, Leopold was recorded in his baby book as having spoken his first words at the age of four months and three weeks old. Leopold began his college studies at the University of Chicago, transferred to the University of Michigan, but returned after a year to study at the University of Chicago. At the time of the murder, he had completed an undergraduate degree at the University of Chicago with Phi Beta Kappa honors. He planned to begin studies at Harvard Law School after a trip to Europe.

By many accounts, Leopold, who had bulging eyes and a small stature, was sensitive about his appearance. He threw himself into intellectual pursuits where he met with remarkable success. Leopold had studied 15 languages and claimed to speak five fluently. He had achieved a measure of national recognition as an ornithologist. Leopold and several other ornithologists identified nesting sites of Kirtland's warblers and made astute observations about the parasitic nesting behavior of brown-headed cowbirds, which threatened the warblers. He maintained his interest in birds after his crime, raising birds in prison and working to help with the struggling Puerto Rican parrot population after his release on parole.

=== Richard Loeb ===
Richard Albert Loeb was born on June 11, 1905, in Chicago, the third of four sons of Anna Henrietta (née Bohnen) and Albert Henry Loeb, a wealthy lawyer and retired vice president of Sears, Roebuck & Company. His father was Jewish and his mother was Catholic. Like Leopold, Loeb was exceptionally intelligent. He was an avid reader, with a passion for history and crime stories. At age 12, he entered the innovative University of Chicago High School. With the encouragement of his governess, he completed his high school education in two years. In 1923, at the age of 17, he would reportedly become the University of Michigan's youngest graduate. Following graduation from Michigan, Loeb enrolled in a few history classes at the University of Chicago. Unlike Leopold, Loeb was athletic and considered handsome.

== Adolescence and early crimes ==
The two young men grew up with their families in the affluent Kenwood neighborhood on Chicago's South Side. The Loebs owned a summer estate (the farm part of which is now called Castle Farms and is a popular wedding venue) in Charlevoix, Michigan, as well as a mansion in Kenwood, two blocks from the Leopold home.

Though Leopold and Loeb knew each other casually while growing up, they began to see more of each other in the spring of 1920; their relationship flourished at the University of Chicago, as part of a mutual friend group. Their sexual relationship began in February 1921 and continued until their arrest.

Since childhood Loeb had been stealing small things from friends, family and stores. He would sometimes show off his pick-pocketing skills to friends in high school in an attempt to impress them. When Loeb met Leopold, they began to steal things together, and worked out a system to cheat their friends and family during games of bridge, though it was largely unsuccessful.

They also began to commit more serious crimes such as burglary, though they often took only relatively minor things such as wine, piano benches and vacuum cleaners. They would also drive around throwing bricks through windows and committed several arsons, often mingling with the crowd watching firefighters work. While Loeb seems to have been content to do these things for fun, Leopold felt the need to justify them philosophically. He was an individual hedonist: as he explained it, he would weigh all of the pleasure or pain he would receive from an action, and do what would give him the most pleasure. This extended to every aspect of his life, including his eventual decision to commit murder. As he explained to a psychiatrist: "Making up my mind to commit murder was practically the same as making up my mind whether or not I should eat pie for supper, whether it would give me pleasure or not."

Leopold was also interested in Friedrich Nietzsche's concept of "supermen" (Übermenschen), interpreting them as transcendent individuals possessing extraordinary and unusual capabilities, whose superior intellects allowed them to rise above the laws and rules that bound the unimportant, average populace. Leopold believed it was possible that he and Loeb could become such individuals, and as such, by his interpretation of Nietzsche's doctrines, they were not bound by any of society's normal ethics or rules. In a letter to Loeb, he wrote, "A superman ... is, on account of certain superior qualities inherent in him, exempted from the ordinary laws which govern men. He is not liable for anything he may do."

After robbing Loeb's old fraternity house at the University of Michigan, where they stole penknives, a camera, and a typewriter that they later used to type the ransom note for their murder victim, Bobby Franks, Loeb proposed they should commit a "perfect crime" that would attract public attention and confirm their superiority to others.

== Murder of Bobby Franks ==
=== Murder ===
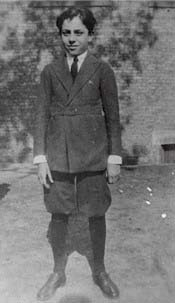
Bobby Franks

Leopold and Loeb, who were 19 and 18, respectively, at the time, settled on kidnapping and murdering a younger adolescent as their perfect crime. They spent seven months planning everything, from the method of abduction to the disposal of the body. To obfuscate the actual nature of their crime and their motive for it, they decided to make a ransom demand, and they also devised an intricate plan for collecting the ransom, which involved a long series of complex instructions that would be communicated one instruction at a time.

After a lengthy search for a suitable victim, mostly on the grounds of the Harvard School for Boys in the Kenwood area, the pair decided upon Robert "Bobby" Franks (born September 19, 1909), 14-year-old son of wealthy Chicago watch manufacturer Jacob Franks. Bobby was an across-the-street neighbor of Loeb's who had played tennis at the Loeb residence several times.

On the afternoon of May 21, 1924, using an automobile that Leopold rented under the name Morton D. Ballard, they offered Franks a ride as he walked home from school. The boy initially refused, because his destination was less than two blocks away, but Loeb persuaded him to enter the car to discuss a tennis racket that he had been using. The precise sequence of the events that followed remains in dispute, but the prevailing view placed Leopold behind the wheel of the car while Loeb sat in the back seat. Loeb struck Franks, who was sitting in front of him in the passenger seat, several times in the head with the handle-end of a chisel. Contemporary press reports noted that the blow was struck with a cold chisel wrapped in tape, and that Leopold made an additional confession after learning the penalty would be the same for both regardless of which had actually struck the fatal blow. He then dragged Franks into the back seat, gagged him, and waited until the boy eventually died. With the body on the floor of the back seat, out of view, the men drove to their predetermined dumping spot near Wolf Lake, in the extreme south side of Chicago. After nightfall, they removed Franks' clothes, then concealed the body in a culvert along the Pennsylvania Railroad tracks north of the lake. To obscure the body's identity, they poured hydrochloric acid on the face and genitals to disguise the fact that he had been circumcised, as circumcision was unusual among non-Jews in the United States at the time.

=== Investigation ===
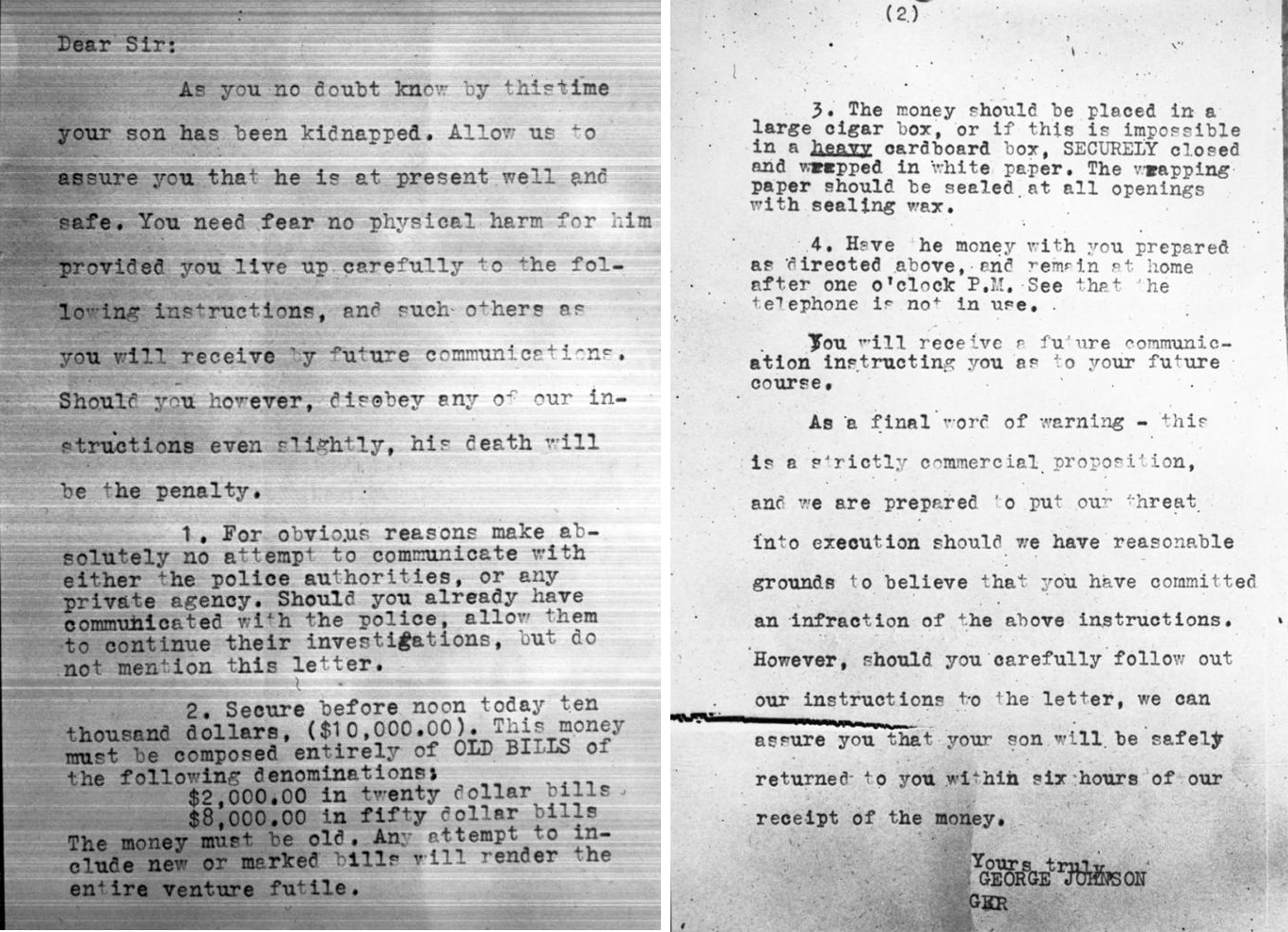
The ransom letter

By the time the two men returned to Chicago, word had already spread that Franks was missing. Leopold called Franks' mother, identifying himself as "George Johnson", and told her that Franks had been kidnapped; instructions for delivering the ransom would follow. After mailing the typed ransom note and burning Franks' clothes, then cleaning the blood stains from the rented vehicle's upholstery, they spent the remainder of the evening playing cards.

Once the Franks family received the ransom note on the following morning, Leopold called a second time and dictated the first set of instructions for the delivery of the ransom payment. The intricate plan was stalled almost immediately when Franks' father forgot the address of the store where he was supposed to receive the next set of directions, and it was abandoned entirely when word came the same day that Franks' body had been found. Leopold and Loeb disposed of the typewriter and burned a blanket which they had used to move Franks' body. They then went about their lives as usual.

Leopold and Loeb both enjoyed chatting about the murder with their friends and relatives. Leopold discussed the case with his professor and a female friend, joking that he would confess and give her the reward money. Loeb helped a couple of reporter friends of his find the drugstore to which he and Leopold had tried to send Mr. Franks, and when asked to describe Bobby he replied: "If I were to murder anybody, it would be just such a cocky little son of a bitch as Bobby Franks."

Police found a pair of eyeglasses near Franks' body. Although the prescription and the frame were common, they were fitted with an unusual hinge which had been purchased by only three customers in Chicago, one of whom was Leopold. When questioned, Leopold offered the possibility that his glasses might have dropped out of his pocket during a bird-watching trip the previous weekend.

During formal questioning on May 29, Leopold and Loeb asserted that on the night of the murder they had picked up two women in Chicago using Leopold's car, then dropped them off some time later without learning their last names; however, Leopold's chauffeur told police that he had been repairing the car that afternoon, and his wife confirmed that claim. The typewriter was recovered from the Jackson Park Lagoon on June 7.

=== Confession ===
Loeb soon confessed, saying that Leopold had planned the crime and had killed Franks in the back seat of the car while he (Loeb) drove. Soon after, Leopold told police that he was the driver and Loeb the killer. Their confessions otherwise corroborated most of the evidence in the case. Both confessions were announced by the state's attorney on May 31.

Leopold later claimed, long after Loeb was dead, that he pleaded in vain with Loeb to admit to killing Franks. "Mompsie feels less terrible than she might, thinking you did it," he quotes Loeb as saying, "and I'm not going to take that shred of comfort away from her." Most observers believed that Loeb did strike the fatal blows. During the sentencing hearing, the defense revealed through psychiatrist Dr. Bernard A. Glueck, described by one reporter as the most credible of the three defense alienists, that Loeb had washed blood from his hands at the culvert where Franks' body was found, establishing him as the actual killer; the revelation was strategically timed to undermine State's Attorney Crowe, who had long assumed Leopold to be the murderer. (A witness claimed to have seen Loeb driving the car, and Leopold in the back seat, minutes before the kidnapping.)

Both Leopold and Loeb admitted that they were driven by their thrill-seeking, Übermenschen (supermen) delusions, and their aspiration to commit a perfect crime. Neither claimed to have looked forward to the killing, but Leopold admitted interest in learning what it would feel like to be a murderer. He was disappointed to note that he felt the same as ever.

== Trial ==
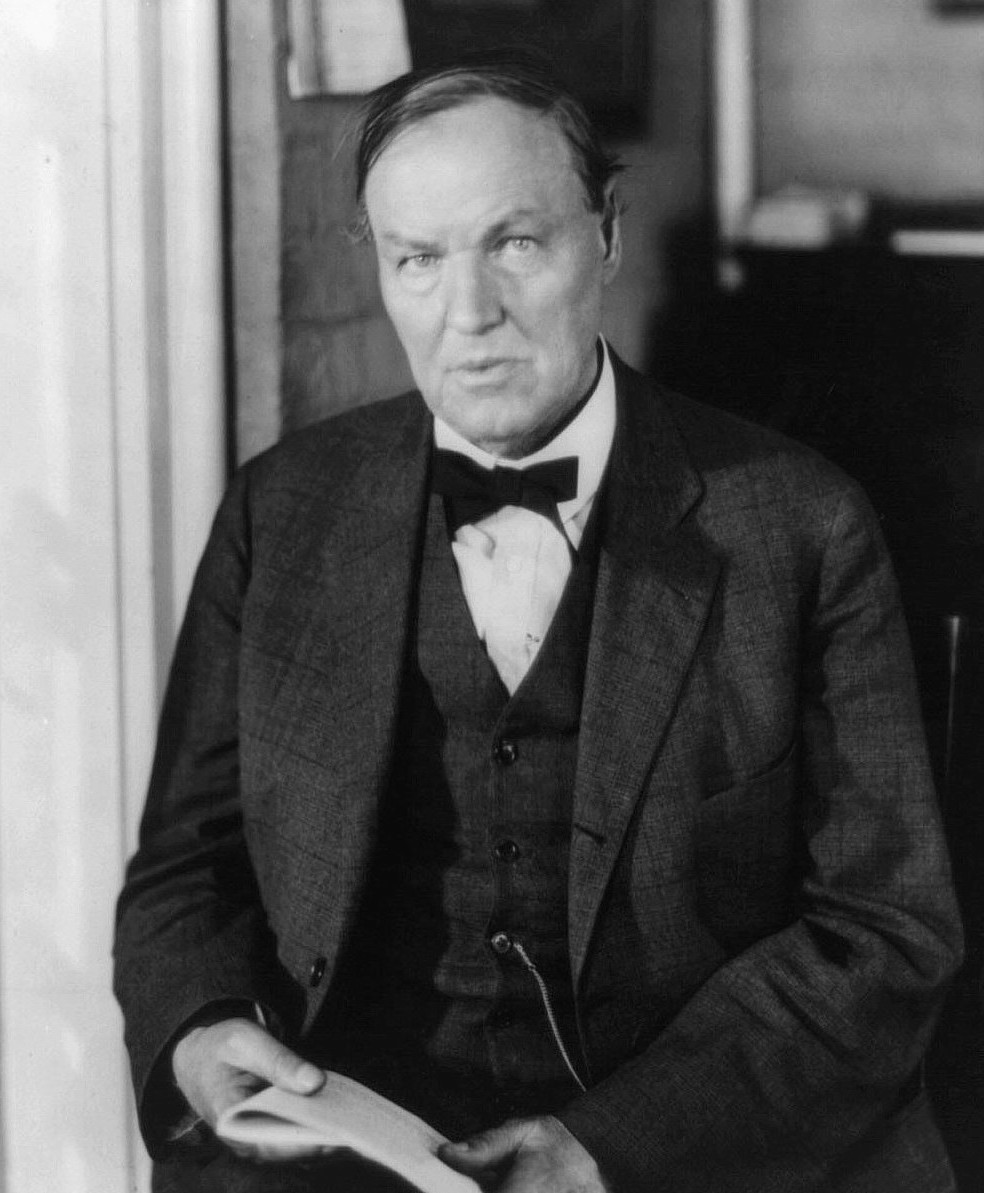
Defense attorney Clarence Darrow

The trial of Leopold and Loeb at Chicago's Cook County Criminal Court became a media spectacle and was labeled "the trial of the century,". The Leopold and Loeb families hired the renowned criminal defense attorney Clarence Darrow to lead the defense team. It was rumored that Darrow was paid $1 million for his services, but he was actually paid $65,000 (equivalent to $1.19 million in 2025). Darrow took the case because he was a staunch opponent of capital punishment.

While it was generally assumed that the men's defense would be based on a plea of not guilty by reason of insanity, Darrow concluded that a jury trial would almost certainly end in conviction and the death penalty. Thus, he elected to enter a plea of guilty, hoping to persuade Cook County Circuit Court Judge John R. Caverly to impose sentences of life imprisonment.

The trial (technically an extended sentencing hearing, as their guilty pleas had already been accepted) ran for 32 days. The state's attorney, Robert E. Crowe, presented 88 witnesses, documenting details of the crime. The defense presented extensive psychiatric testimony in an effort to establish mitigating circumstances, including physical abnormalities, an over-abundance of money and, in Leopold's case, sexual abuse by a governess.

One piece of evidence was a letter written by Leopold mentioning his homosexual affair with Loeb. Both the prosecution and the defense interpreted this information as supportive of their own position. The prosecution presented Leopold and Loeb as "perverts" and their homosexuality as a motive for their crime, whereas Darrow presented their relationship as evidence that they suffered from insanity and were therefore not responsible for their actions. Darrow called a series of expert witnesses, who offered a catalog of Leopold's and Loeb's abnormalities. One witness testified to their dysfunctional endocrine glands, another to the delusions that had led to their crime.

=== Darrow's speech ===
Darrow's impassioned, eight-hour-long "masterful plea" at the conclusion of the hearing has been called the finest speech of his career. Contemporary press reported that in his final plea on August 25, Darrow declared the crime was "inherent in the boys' organisms," arguing it came from ancestors or from training and environment while their minds were forming, and that "to believe any boy responsible for himself or early training is to be absurd." Its principal arguments were that the methods and punishments of the American justice system were inhumane, and the youth and immaturity of the accused:

We read of killing one hundred thousand men in a day [during World War I]; probably exaggerated, but what of it?

We read about it and we rejoiced in it; if it was the other fellows who were killed. We were fed on flesh and drank blood.

Even down to the prattling babe, and I need not tell your honor this, because you know, I need not tell you how many upright, honorable young boys have come into this court charged with murder, some saved and some gone to their death, boys who fought in this war and learned how cheap human life was. You know it and I know it.

These boys were brought up in it.

...

It will take fifty years to wipe it out of the human heart, at least, if ever. I know this, for I have studied these things, that after the Civil War in 1865, crimes of this sort increased, marvelously increased. No one needs to tell me that crime has no cause. It has as definite a cause as any other disease, and I know that out of the hatred and bitterness of the Civil War crime increased as America had never seen before.

...

I know that Europe is going through it today; I know it has followed every war; and I know it has influenced these boys so that blood was not the same blood to them that it would have been if the world had not been bathed in blood.

...

Your Honor knows that in this very court crimes of violence have increased growing out of the war.

Not necessarily by those who fought but by those that learned that blood was cheap and human life was cheap and if the State could take it lightly why not the individual?

...

Has the court any right to consider anything but these two boys?

Yes.

The State says that your Honor has a right to consider the welfare of the community, as you have. If the welfare of the community would be benefited by taking these lives, well and good.

I think it would work evil that no one could measure.

Has your Honor a right to consider the families of these defendants?

I have been sorry, and I am sorry for the bereavement of Mr. and Mrs. Franks and the little sister; for those broken ties that cannot be mended.

All I can hope and wish is that some good may come from it.

But as compared with the families of Leopold and Loeb, they are to be envied. They are to be envied, and everyone knows it.

...

Here is Leopold's father, – and this boy was the pride of his life. He watched him, he cared for him, he worked for him; he was brilliant and accomplished, he educated him, and he thought that fame and position awaited him, as it should have. It is a hard thing for a father to see his life's hopes crumbling into the dust.

...

And Loeb's, the same. The faithful uncle and brother, who have watched here day by day, while his father and his mother are too ill to stand this terrific strain, waiting for a message which means more to them than it can mean to you or me. Have they got any rights?

...

The easy thing and the popular thing to do is to hang my clients. I know it. Men and women who do not think will applaud. The cruel and the thoughtless will approve. It will be easy today, but in Chicago, and reaching out over the length and breadth of the land, more and more fathers and mothers, the humane, the kind and the hopeful, who are gaining an understanding and asking questions not only about these poor boys, but about their own.

These will join in no acclaim at the death of my clients. These would ask that the shedding of blood be stopped, and that the normal feelings of man resume their sway.

...

Your Honor stands between the past and the future. You may hang these boys; you may hang them by the neck 'till they are dead. But in doing it you will turn your face toward the past. In doing it you are making it harder for every other boy.

In doing it you are making it harder for unborn children. You may save them and it makes it easier for every child that some time may sit where these boys sit. It makes it easier for every human being with an aspiration and a vision and a hope and a fate.

I am pleading for the future; I am pleading for a time when hatred and cruelty will not control the hearts of men. When we can learn by reason and judgment and understanding and faith that all life is worth saving, and that mercy is the highest attribute of man.

— Trial Transcript of The State of Illinois vs. Nathan Leopold and Richard Loeb, 4104-4113

The judge was persuaded, but he explained in his ruling that his decision was based primarily on precedent and the youth of the accused. On September 10, 1924, he sentenced both Leopold and Loeb to life imprisonment for the murder, and an additional 99 years for the kidnapping. A little over a month later, Loeb's father died of heart failure.

Darrow's handling of the law as defense counsel has been criticized for hiding psychiatric expert testimony that conflicted with his polemical goals and for relying on an absolute denial of free will, one of the principles legitimizing all criminal punishment.

== Imprisonment ==
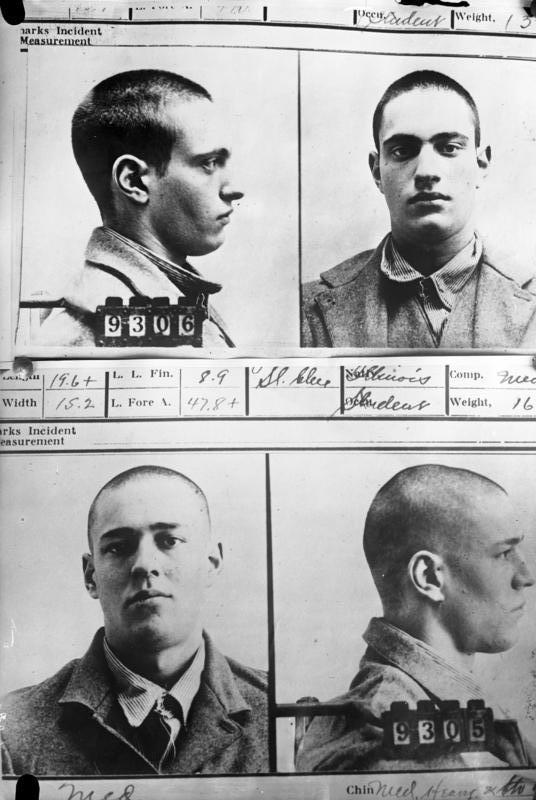
Leopold (upper) and Loeb (lower), 1924

Leopold and Loeb were initially held in Joliet Prison and did menial labor, Leopold working in the prison's rattan factory and Loeb in the chair factory. Although they were kept apart as much as possible, the two of them managed to maintain their friendship. Leopold was transferred to Stateville Penitentiary in 1925 for an appendectomy, where he worked in the shoe factory and then in the library as a clerk for the prison's Protestant chaplain. He was caught violating prison rules and sent to solitary confinement many times, at one point possibly being involved in the escape of seven prisoners. In Joliet, Loeb worked in the yard delivering messages before being promoted to clerk for the deputy warden. He was transferred to Stateville in 1930, where he began to work in the prison's greenhouse and landscaping the prison yard. Once Leopold and Loeb were in the same prison, the pair began to spend much of their time together. They did sociological research together and expanded the prison's school system, adding a high school and junior college curriculum.

=== Loeb's death ===
On January 28, 1936, Loeb was attacked with a straight razor in a shower room by a fellow inmate, James Day, and died in the prison hospital soon afterward. Day claimed that Loeb had attempted to sexually assault him, but he was unharmed while Loeb sustained more than fifty wounds, including defensive wounds on his arms and hands, and his throat had been slashed from behind. News accounts suggested that Loeb had propositioned Day, and some praised Day for his actions.

Several weeks after the killing, Mark Hellinger wrote in his syndicated column, "I must tell you of the line that came to me from an unknown correspondent in Chicago. This anonymous contributor said he had the absolute low-down on the recent slaying of Dickie Loeb. Seems that Loeb made a slight mistake in grammar. He ended a sentence in a proposition..." While some sources state Ed Lahey had previously written in the Chicago Daily News, "Richard Loeb, despite his erudition, today ended his sentence with a proposition", no evidence has been found that this was ever published, and actual copy from that date reads otherwise.

Though several prison officials, including the warden, believed that Loeb had been murdered, Day was found not guilty by a jury after a short trial in June 1936. There is no evidence that Loeb was a sexual predator while in prison, but Day was later caught at least once in a sexual act with a fellow inmate. In his autobiography, Life Plus 99 Years, Leopold ridiculed Day's claim that Loeb had attempted to sexually assault him. That was echoed by the prison's Catholic chaplain, a confidant of Loeb's, who said that it was more likely that Day attacked Loeb after Loeb rebuffed his advances.

=== Leopold's years in prison ===
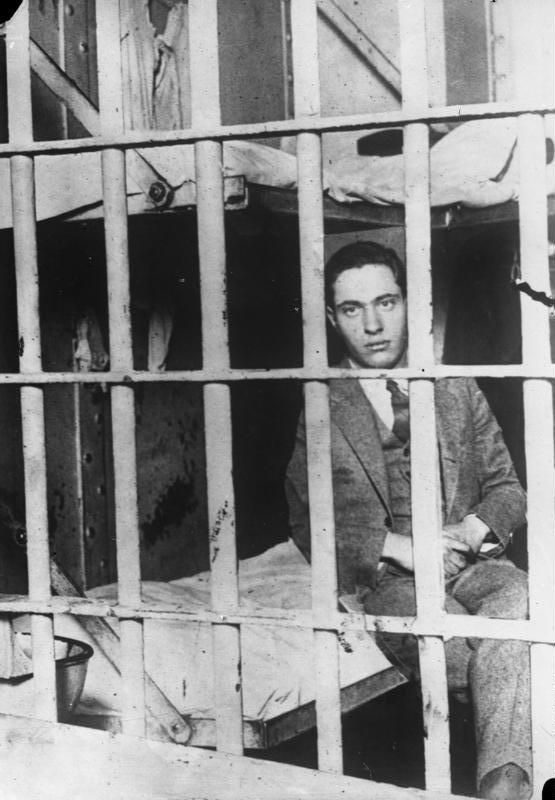
Leopold in the Stateville Penitentiary, 1931

Leopold continued his work expanding the school and teaching after Loeb's death. In 1944, Leopold volunteered for the Stateville Penitentiary Malaria Study. He was deliberately inoculated with malaria pathogens and subjected to several experimental malaria treatments. He later wrote that all his good work in prison and after his release was an effort to compensate for his crime.

In the early 1950s, author Meyer Levin, a graduate of the University of Chicago, requested Leopold's cooperation in the writing of a novel that was based on the murder of Franks. Leopold responded to Meyer Levin's request by stating that he did not want his story to be told in a fictionalized form, but offered Levin a chance to contribute to his own memoir, which was in progress. Though the pair met to discuss the possibility, Leopold rejected Levin's help and Levin went ahead with his book alone, despite Leopold's express objections. The novel, titled Compulsion, was published in 1956.

Levin portrayed Leopold, under the pseudonym Judd Steiner, as a brilliant but deeply disturbed teenager, psychologically driven to kill because of his abnormal sexuality, troubled childhood and an obsession with Loeb. Leopold later wrote that reading Levin's book made him "physically sick... More than once I had to lay the book down and wait for the nausea to subside. I felt as I suppose a man would feel if he were exposed stark-naked under a strong spotlight before a large audience."

Leopold's autobiography, Life Plus 99 Years, was published in 1958 as part of his campaign to win parole. His book was on the New York Times Best Seller list for 14 weeks. While the book received generally positive reviews, some accused Leopold of writing it solely as a means of rehabilitation of his public image, ignoring the dark side of his past.

== Leopold's post-prison years ==
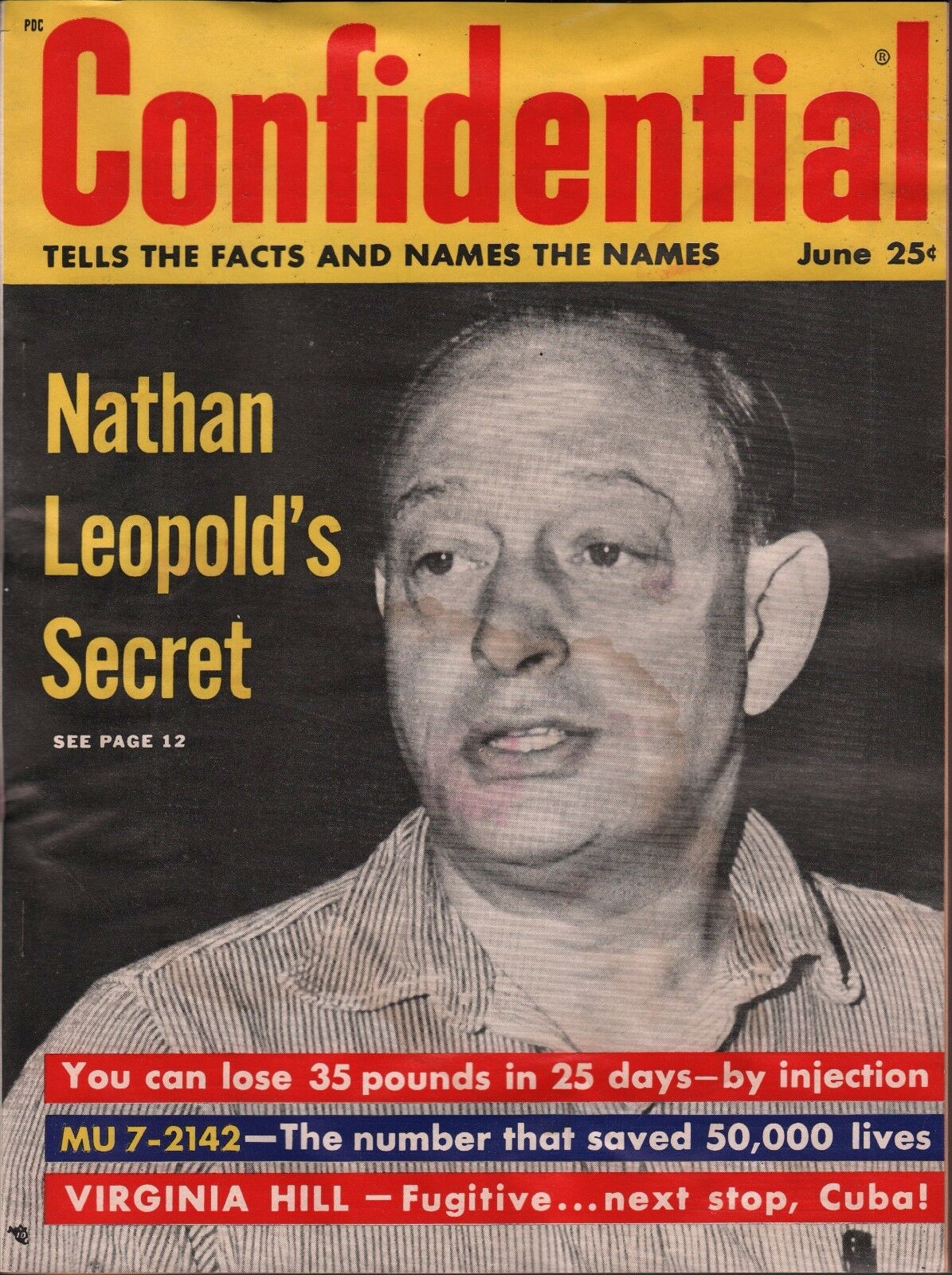
Nathan Leopold in 1958

After 33 years and numerous unsuccessful petitions, Leopold was released on parole on March 13, 1958. The Brethren Service Commission, a Church of the Brethren-affiliated program, accepted him as a medical technician at its hospital in Puerto Rico. He expressed his appreciation in an article: "To me the Brethren Service Commission offered the job, the home, and the sponsorship without which a man cannot be paroled. But it gave me so much more than that – the companionship, the acceptance, the love which would have rendered a violation of parole almost impossible." He was known as "Nate" to neighbors and co-workers at Castañer General Hospital in Adjuntas, where he worked as a laboratory and X-ray assistant.

Later in 1958, Leopold attempted to set up the Leopold Foundation, to be funded by royalties from Life Plus 99 Years, "to aid emotionally disturbed, retarded, or delinquent youths." The State of Illinois voided his charter on grounds that it violated the terms of his parole.

In 1959, Leopold sought to block production of the film version of Compulsion on the grounds that Levin's book had invaded his privacy, defamed him, profited from his life story and "intermingled fact and fiction to such an extent that they were indistinguishable." After 11 years and many appeals, the Illinois Supreme Court ruled against him, holding that Leopold, as the confessed perpetrator of the "crime of the century," could not reasonably argue that any book had injured his reputation.

Leopold moved to Santurce and married a widowed florist, Gertrude (Feldman) García de Quevedo, on February 5, 1961. Despite his marriage, Leopold had many gay relationships in Puerto Rico, some continuing from those which he started in prison, and he enjoyed frequenting gay bars and male prostitutes. He also continued to commit crimes, though he was never caught or prosecuted, including offenses of statutory rape and charity fraud.

Leopold earned a master's degree at the University of Puerto Rico. He became a researcher in the Social Service Program of Puerto Rico's Department of Health. He also worked for an urban renewal and housing agency, and he conducted studies on leprosy at the University of Puerto Rico School of Medicine.

Leopold was an active member of the Natural History Society of Puerto Rico. He traveled throughout the island to observe its birdlife. In 1963, he published Checklist of Birds of Puerto Rico and the Virgin Islands. While he spoke about his intention to write a book about his life since his release from prison, which he titled Reach for a Halo, he never completed it.

Leopold died of a diabetes-related heart attack on August 29, 1971, at the age of 66.

== In popular culture ==
The Franks murder has inspired works of film, theatre and fiction, some of which imply the homosexual nature of the perpetrators' relationship without stating it outright. These works include the 1929 play Rope by Patrick Hamilton, and Alfred Hitchcock's film of the same name in 1948. A fictionalized version of the events formed the basis of Meyer Levin's 1956 novel Compulsion and its 1959 film adaptation. In 1957, two more fictionalizations were published: Nothing but the Night by James Yaffe and Little Brother Fate by Mary-Carter Roberts. Never the Sinner, John Logan's 1985 play, was based on contemporary newspaper accounts of the case, and included an overt portrayal of Leopold and Loeb's sexual relationship.

In his book Murder Most Queer (2014), theater scholar Jordan Schildcrout examines changing attitudes toward homosexuality in various theatrical and cinematic representations of the Leopold and Loeb case.

Other works said to be influenced by the case include Richard Wright's 1940 novel Native Son, the Columbo episode "Columbo Goes to College" (1990), Tom Kalin's 1992 film Swoon, Michael Haneke's 1997 Austrian film Funny Games and the 2008 International remake, Barbet Schroeder's Murder by Numbers (2002), Daniel Clowes's 2005 graphic novel Ice Haven, the Murdoch Mysteries episode "Big Murderer on Campus", Stephen Dolginoff's 2005 off-Broadway musical Thrill Me: The Leopold and Loeb Story, Micah Nemerever's These Violent Delights (2020), and the Ghostface killers in Scream (1996).

In the WB series Riverdale, Archie is incarcerated in the "Leopold & Loeb Institute for Delinquent Youth."

Prior to becoming the Chief Creative Officer of Archie Comics, Roberto Aguirre-Sacasa wrote an unauthorized play in which the fictional teenager Archie Andrews had a homosexual relationship with Nathan Leopold. Before it could open, Aguirre-Sacasa was forced to stop the production after being served a cease and desist from Archie Comics. The production eventually opened under the name Weird Comic Book Fantasy.

Gregory J. Read's 2006 film Like Minds (also released as Murderous Intent) is believed to have been inspired by the Leopold and Loeb case. The film depicts a photograph of Leopold and Loeb in the fictional book Principles of Criminal Psychology: Fifth Edition by George R. Booth and Andrew Porter, which is consulted by the character Sally Rowe, a forensic psychologist, during her research into Gestalt psychology.

== See also ==
- Brian Draper and Torey Adamcik
- Moors murders
- Eric Harris and Dylan Klebold
