= My Father's House (film) =

1947 film by Herbert Kline

My Father's House (Hebrew: בית אבי) is a 1947 British Mandatory Palestine-American drama film directed by Herbert Kline, with a script by Jewish-American novelist and journalist Meyer Levin. Kline and Levin produced the film. The cinematography is by Floyd Crosby. The film was an official selection of the 1950 Venice Film Festival. One of the lead actors was the Israeli sculptor Yitzhak Danziger, who was cast due to his exotic appearance. At the time, Ronnie Cohen, the lead actor, was nine years old. He had been born in Britain to a Zionist family and had immigrated to Israel when he was three. The director spent a few months looking for an English-speaking child until he found Cohen through the film's make-up artist, who was the hairdresser of Cohen's mother. The music is mainly composed of Hebrew folk songs and occasionally Maller-Kalikstein music; the music editor was Henry Brandt. The locations were all in Mandatory Palestine, and are now Israel: Afikim, Ginosar, Gvulot, Kfar Hittim, Kinneret, Kiryat Anavim, Ma'ale HaHamisha, Ma'abarot, Nirim and Ramat Rachel. This is an English-speaking film because it was made for the American-Jewish audience. The budget was provided mainly from wealthy Jewish residents of Palestine and Americans, and the remainder from Zionist institutions.

== Plot ==
David Halevy is a ten-year-old Holocaust survivor. He is separated from his father in Nazi-occupied Kraków. His father has told him that they will meet in Palestine. After the war, David goes to Palestine, hoping that he will meet his father there. On the ship he befriends Miryam, who lost her family in an extermination camp. David is taken to Meir Shfeya youth village, but he cannot adapt and makes a journey to find his father. After a long journey he is told that his parents were both murdered in the Holocaust.

== Cast ==
- Avraham – Yitzhak Danziger
- David – Ronnie Cohen
- Maccabee – Michael Cohen
- Miriam – Irene Broza
- Shmulik – Zalman Levioush
- Shulamit – Israela Epstein
- Waiter – Raphael Klatchkin
- Yehuda Halevi – Yoseph Millo
- Nahama – Miriam Laserson
