= Miriam Laserson =

Russian-born actress (1919–2021)

- Miriam Laserson, from a 1947 newspaper
- Born: May 23, 1919; Moscow, Soviet Union
- Died: July 2, 2021 (aged 102); Brookline, Massachusetts, U.S.
- Other names: Miriam Lazerson, Miriam Weiser Varon
- Occupation: Actress
- Spouse: Benno Weiser Varon

Miriam Laserson (May 23, 1919 – July 2, 2021) was a Russian-born actress, poet and writer. In 1947 she was promoted in the United States as "Palestine's First Film Star".

== Early life ==
Laserson was born in Moscow in 1919, the daughter of engineer Leon Laserson and physician Frieda Orkin Laserson. Her family was Jewish. As a child she lived with her family in Riga and Vienna. She attended the Sorbonne in Paris, but skipped classes there to take acting lessons.

== Career ==
Laserson was visiting her parents in Bucharest when World War II began. They fled to Tel Aviv, where she lived from 1939 to 1947, and became a professional actress with the Habima Theatre, and co-founder of the Ha Teatron Ha-Hadash. While in the United States to promote her first film, she was called "Palestine's First Film Star". She decided to stay in New York City. She worked on Wall Street while establishing a stage and television career.

On screen, Laserson appeared in Meyer Levin's Beit Avi (My Father's House, 1947), Mr. Citizen (1955, television), CBS Workshop (The Lady of the Dawn, 1960, television), and The Imported Bridegroom (1990). She also had a writing credit for The Lady of the Dawn, her own adaptation of the Alejandro Casona play.

Laserson and her husband moved to Israel in 1960; her husband later served as Israel's first ambassador to the Dominican Republic. She lived in New York again in 1966 and 1967, while her husband was at the United Nations, then moved to Paraguay, where they opened Israel's first embassy in Asuncion. The couple retired from foreign service and settled in Brookline, Massachusetts in 1972. She acted in Boston, and wrote three volumes of poetry. She did translation work in German, Hebrew, French, Spanish and English.

== Personal life and death ==
Laserson was briefly romantically linked to Paul Lukas in 1955, after they worked together on Mr. Citizen. She married ambassador Benno Weiser Varon in 1956. They had two children, Leonard and Daniela. She was widowed when Varon died in 2010, and she died in Brookline, Massachusetts on July 2, 2021, at the age of 102.
