= Gabriel Levin =

Gabriel Levin (Hebrew: גבריאל לוין; born 1948, Paris) is a poet, translator, and essayist.

== Biography ==
Gabriel Levin is the son of American novelist Meyer Levin and French novelist Tereska Torrès. His younger brother Mikael Levin is a New York-based photographer. While growing up, Gabriel and his family split their time between New York, Paris, and Israel. He lived in Jerusalem until 2025 whence he embarked upon a Mediterranean periplum. Writing of his volume of essays A Dune's Twisted Edge, poet Ange Mlinko has described Levin as "an American-born Israeli poet who has parlayed his restless peripatetics into a poetics."

== Literary career ==
Levin is one of the founding editors of Ibis Editions, a small non-profit press devoted to publishing literature of the Levant. His work has appeared in numerous literary magazines including P. N. Review, The Times Literary Supplement, Chicago Review, Raritan, Parnassus, and The Guardian. In 2012 British composer Alexander Goehr set Levin's book To These Dark Steps to music for tenor, children's choir, and ensemble. The piece premiered in September 2012 at the CBSO Centre in Birmingham. Levin's writing has been described as part of the "Neo-modernist" tradition.

== Published works ==
=== Poetry ===
- Sleepers of Beulah – Sinclair-Stevenson, London 1991
- Ostraca – Anvil Press Poetry, London 2000; French translation Ostraca, Edition bilingue français-anglais, Le Bruit du temps, 2010
- The Maltese Dreambook – Anvil Press Poetry, London 2008
- To These Dark Steps, Anvil Press Poetry, London 2012
- Coming Forth By Day, Carcanet, Manchester 2014
- Errant, Carcanet, Manchester 2018

=== Prose ===
- Hezekiah's Tunnel – Publisher: Ibis Editions; 1997 (French translation: Le Tunnel d'Ezéchias et deux autres récits, Le Bruit du temps, 2010) [a] "delightful, discursive but moody midnight meditation on Jerusalem"

=== Essays ===
- The Dune's Twisted Edge, Journeys in the Levant – University of Chicago Press, Chicago 2013

=== Translations ===
- Poems from the Diwan – Yehuda Halevi (Author), Gabriel Levin (Translator) Anvil Press Poetry 2002
- On the Sea: Poems by Yehuda Halevi – Translated and introduced by Gabriel Levin, Ibis Press
- The Little Bookseller Oustaz Ali by Rassim; "ravishly" (The Jerusalem Post) translated and introduced by Gabriel Levin
- So What: New & Selected Poems (With a Story) 1971–2005 by Taha Muhammad Ali (Author), Peter Cole (Translator), Yahya Hijazi, and Gabriel Levin (Translator and Introduction, Copper Canyon Press, 2005)
- Never Mind: Twenty Poems and a Story by Taha Muhammad Ali (Author), Peter Cole (Translator), Yahya Hijazi (Translator), and Gabriel Levin 2000 Ibis Press ISBN 965-90125-2-7.
- Muck, A novel, by Dror Burstein, Farrar, Straus and Giroux, 2018

=== Collections ===
- The Water's Edge: Meetings of Image And Word, Ed. Ardyn Halter, with poems by Jennie Feldman, Seamus Heaney, Geoffrey Hill, Gabriel Levin, Michael Longley, Jamie McKendrick, Paul Muldoon, Don Paterson, Robin Robertson, and Stephen Romer, Lund Humphries, Burlington 2006.

=== Other ===
- Found in Translation: 100 Years of Modern Hebrew Poetry by Robert Friend (translator editor) and Gabriel Levin (introduction and biographical notes) -1999
- Pleasant if somewhat rude views by Mikael and Gabriel Levin, August 2005 One Star Press
- Préface to D. H. Lawrence, Croquis étrusques, Le Bruit du temps, 2010.

== See also ==
- Marek Szwarc
- Boaz Levin
