= Éric Schwab =

French photojournalist

Eric Schwab
- Born: 1910
- Died: 1977 (aged 66–67)
- Occupation: Photographer

Eric Schwab (1910–1977) was a French photographer, photojournalist and war correspondent. Starting in 1944 he worked for Agence France-Presse (AFP). In the 1950s and 1960s he was employed by several United Nations organizations such as WHO.

In April and May 1945 he documented the atrocities in Nazi concentration camps.

== Life and work ==
Eric Schwab was born in Hamburg in 1910. He was the son of a Frenchman and a German woman who were persecuted and deported during the Nazi regime because of their Jewish origin. Supposedly he came to Paris in the 1930s, where he worked as a photographer and reporter. In 1939 he was drafted into military service. After the Battle of Dunkirk in June 1940 he was interned by the Germans, but managed to escape after a few weeks while on a train packed with prisoners and bound for Germany. He returned to Paris, where he began working as a photographer again. He joined the French Resistance. The research of Annette Wierviorka next locates him near the Loire River in 1944, fighting with the French Forces of the Interior as the Resistance was then known. Due to the Jewish origins of his mother he had to be very cautious and had to hide from Nazis which had anti-Jewish laws implemented also in occupied France. His mother was deported to Theresienstadt in 1943.

=== Documentation of Nazi concentration camps in 1945 ===
Schwab was among the first photographers who, in 1944, joined the newly founded Agence France-Presse (AFP). Together with American journalist and writer Meyer Levin he travelled to Germany in April 1945, right after the liberation from the Nazi regime. According to Agence France-Presse, they were ″travelling together into the darkness on board their jeep "Spirit of Alpena". Both were on a painful quest, Levin to investigate the fate of Europe's Jews in World War II, and Schwab to find his mother who was deported in 1943.″ Levin and Schwab documented Nazi crimes in the concentration camps Buchenwald, Leipzig-Thekla and Dachau. When they arrived at Theresienstadt concentration camp Schwab was reunited with his mother whom he had believed dead.

Schwab's most notable work is the portrait called Dysenteric dying from Buchenwald. Although liberated the man died a few minutes after the photograph of him was taken. David Bowie chose this picture as Photograph of the Century in Die Zeit in 1998, at the time saying "In my eyes this photograph is the expression of violence and destruction that dominated large parts of the 20th century. The horrific tragedy of a man dying just after he regained his freedom is breaking one's heart."

Still in 1945, Schwab went to Norway for reportage.

=== New York ===
In 1946, Schwab moved to New York City, together with his mother. There he continued working for AFP, however now devoting himself to serene subjects. He observed and photographed the activities on Broadway, the swimmers at Coney Island or the Jazz clubs of Harlem. In the archives of AFP, a series of photographs of Nat King Cole at the Apollo Theater in Harlem was found. The images stem from 1950.

=== In the service of United Nations organizations ===
In the early 1950s, Schwab left AFP and went on assignment for several UN organizations to visit the developing countries of the Philippines (1959) or Ethiopia (1961) – both on behalf of the World Health Organization (WHO).

=== Death ===
Schwab died in 1977 at the age of 67 – without having left a report about his journey to the Nazi concentration camps and the reunion with his mother at Theresienstadt. He was survived by his daughter, Corinne Schwab.

== Perception ==
Photographs by Schwab were reprinted by many media – often without crediting his name as the copyrights were owned by AFP. It has been confirmed that the German magazine Stern published some of his pictures. Photographs by Schwab were also shown in several exhibitions, amongst them the exhibit Photographies des camps de concentration which was organized by the Musée national de la Résistance in 2005. One of his photographs, showing a refugee family from Punjab, was also seen in the 1955 exhibition The Family of Man, curated by Edward Steichen at the Museum of Modern Art in New York. This show toured the world, has been seen by over 10 million visitors and has been established as a permanent exhibition at the Clervaux castle in Luxembourg since 2013.

In 2025, France issued a commemorative stamp in Eric Schwab's honor.

== Gallery ==
There is only one photograph by Schwab without any copyright restriction:

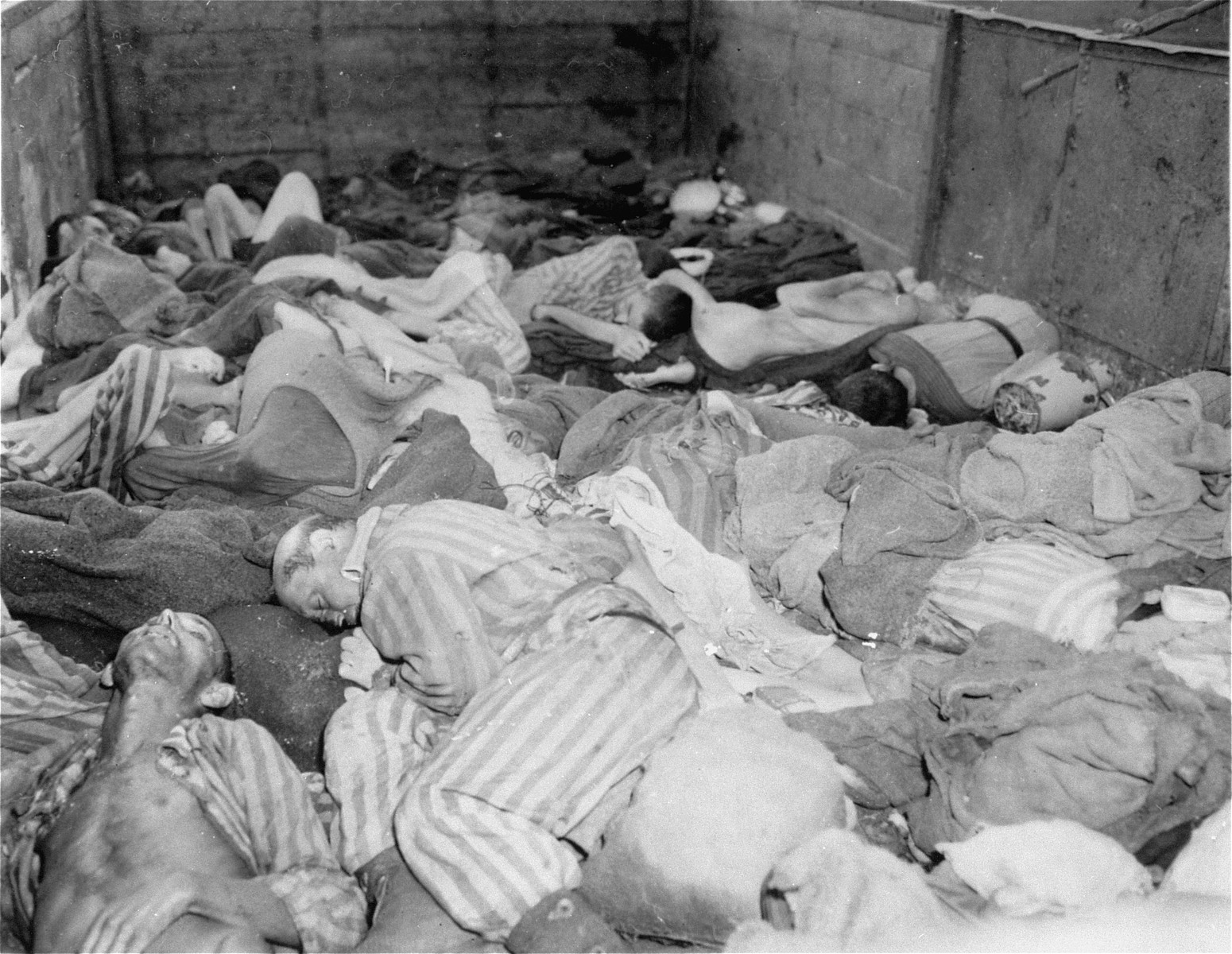
Corpses in the Death Train, Dachau 1945

== Publications ==
- La Photographie Humaniste, 1945–1968. By d'Izis, Boubat, Brassaï, Doisneau, Ronis.... Paris: Bibliothèque nationale de France, 2006. ISBN 9782717723670. Published on the occasion of an exhibition at Bibliothèque nationale de France, Paris, 2006/07.
