= Stephen Dolginoff =

American playwright and composer

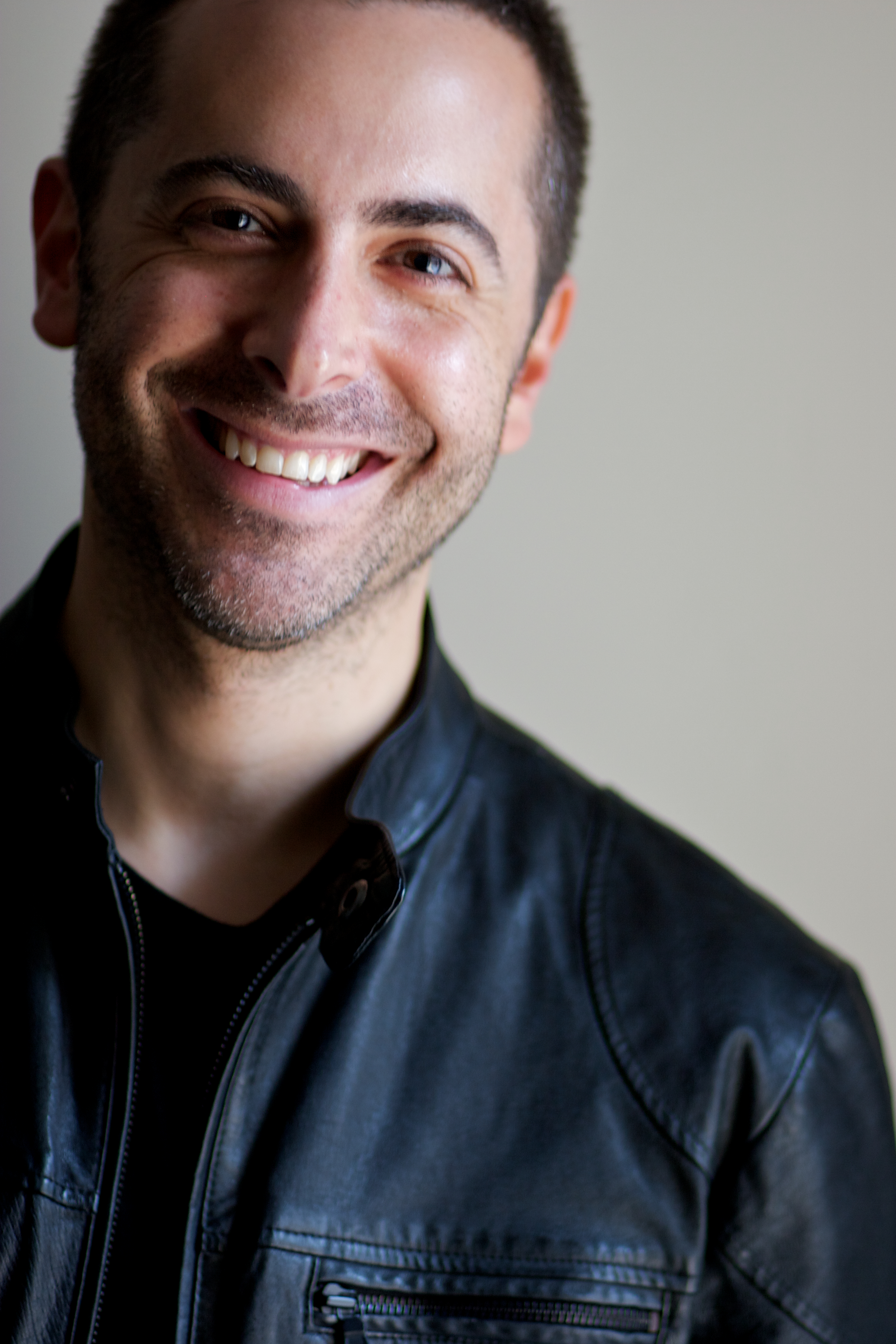
- Stephen Dolginoff
- Born: May 8, 1968
- Education: New York University, Tisch School of the Arts
- Known for: Playwright/Composer/Lyricist
- Website: Stephendolginoff.com

Stephen Dolginoff is an American playwright and composer. His most notable work is Thrill Me, the musical version of the true story of Leopold and Loeb, which opened Off-Broadway at the York Theatre in 2005, featuring Dolginoff himself as Nathan Leopold. Subsequently, it was published by Dramatists Play Service, and has had over 150 productions in 16 countries and 10 languages. Dolginoff won an ASCAP Music Award for the score of Thrill Me and was nominated for New York's Drama Desk Award for both Best Musical and Best Music Score as well as an Outer Critics Circle Award nomination for Best Off-Broadway Musical. The Los Angeles production was nominated for an Ovation Award for Best Musical in an Intimate Theatre. In 2009, Dolginoff received a Los Angeles Garland Award honorable mention for the Music & Lyrics of Thrill Me.

For his 1994 musical, One Foot Out the Door, he received the Backstage Bistro Award for Outstanding Book, Music & Lyrics.

Dolginoff has also written the musicals Flames (premiere production 2013), which was subsequently published by Samuel French, Inc., Monster Makers, which premiered in NYC in 2015 at the Daryl Roth Theatre/D-Lounge, featuring Dolginoff as Max Schreck, Boris Karloff and Peter Cushing, and was also published by Samuel French; Most Men Are, Journey to the Center of the Earth and Panic (which opened at the Lamb Theatre in April 2009). After starring in the Off-Broadway production, Dolginoff later portrayed the role of Nathan Leopold, in the Seattle, and Buffalo productions of Thrill Me, and reprised the roles of Schreck, Karloff & Cushing in a second staging of Monster Makers in 2016 at Feinstein's/54 Below in New York City. In 2018 he originated the role of “Orson Welles” in a revised version of his musical Panic at The Cell Theatre in New York City. He received a BFA in Dramatic Writing from NYU/Tisch School of the Arts.

In 2024, his memoir “Thrill Maker” was published. It details the thirty year history of his musical “Thrill Me.”

He was born and raised in Kansas City.
