= Robert E. Crowe =

American lawyer and politician (1879-1958)

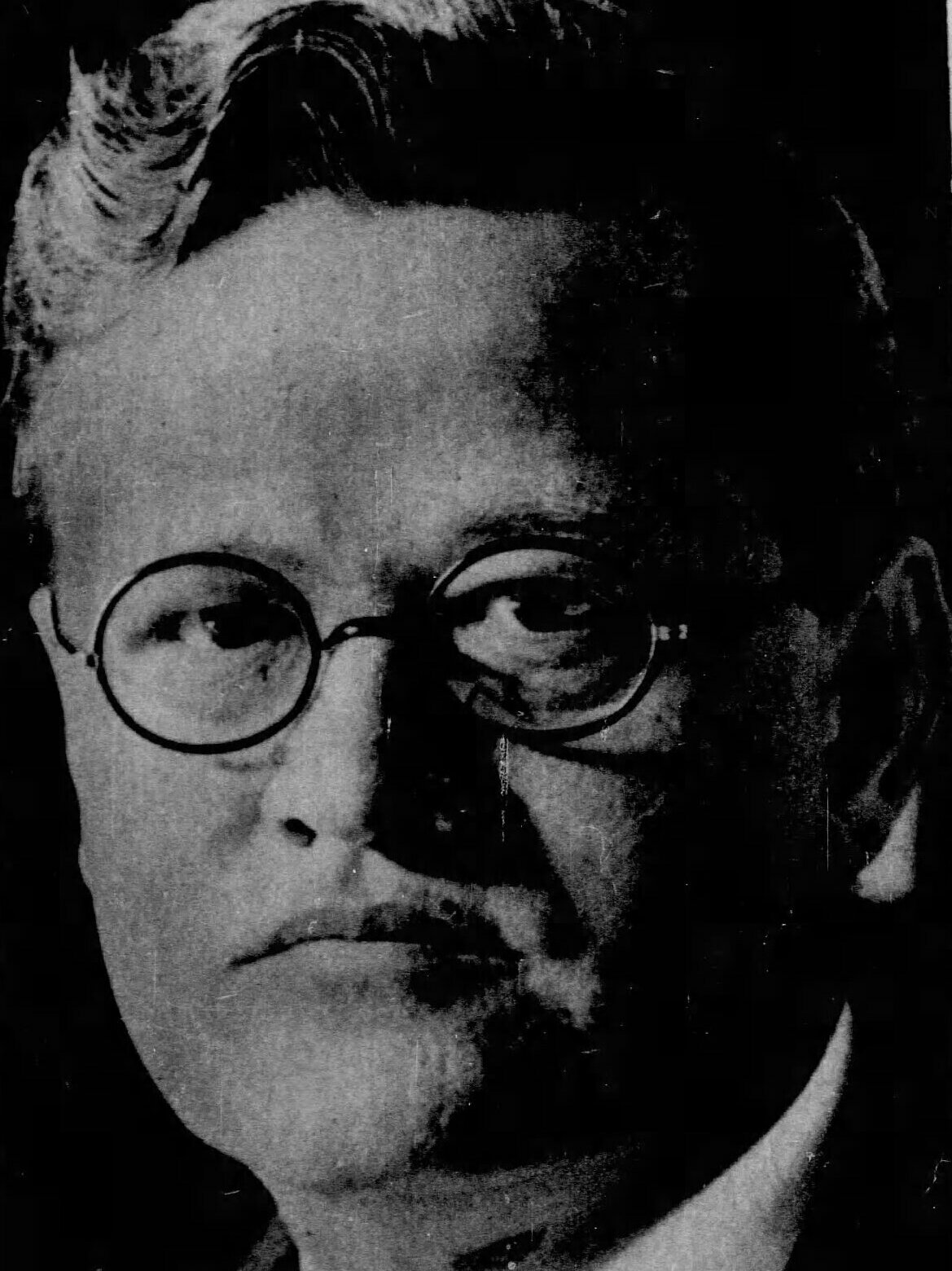
Crowe as Cook County state's attorney

Robert Emmett Crowe (January 22, 1879 - January 18, 1958) was a Chicago lawyer and politician, who is best known as the prosecutor in the 1924 Leopold and Loeb murder case. He was 45 at the time and the case shaped his career.

A product of Chicago public schools, Crowe graduated from Yale with a law degree in 1901. One of Crowe's early legal associates was Leo Koretz, against whom Crowe would later file charges for running a massive Ponzi scheme. With the help of Chicago Mayor William Hale Thompson, popularly known as "Big Bill" Thompson, Crowe was elected a Cook County Circuit Court judge in 1916. Three years later, Crowe achieved a level of fame and notoriety by imposing the death penalty on Thomas Fitzgerald, who had pleaded guilty to the murder of his neighbor, 6-year-old Janet Dolly Wilkinson. The following year, with Thompson's continued backing, he was elected Cook County state's attorney.

In 1924, he prosecuted Nathan Leopold and Richard Loeb for the premeditated murder of Bobby Franks, squaring off against defender Clarence Darrow.

== Electoral history ==
Cook County Circuit Court election (November 7, 1916)
Candidate	Votes	%
Robert E. Crowe	255,299	49.55
Jacob H. Hopkins	229,139	44.47
Carl Strover	30,810	5.98
Total votes	515,248	100

1920 Cook County State's Attorney election
Party	Candidate	Votes	%
Republican	Robert E. Crowe	525,115	58.44
Democratic	Michael L. Igoe	319,236	35.53
Socialist	William A. Cunnea	50,766	5.65
Farmer–Labor	John C. Teevan	3,463	0.39
Total votes		898,580	100
