= Leo Koretz =

American lawyer who ran an elaborate Ponzi scheme

- Born: July 30, 1879; Rokycany, Bohemia
- Died: January 8, 1925 (aged 45); Joliet, Illinois, United States
- Resting place: Waldheim Cemetery Co., Forest Park, IL; 41.858375°N 87.819144°W
- Education: Chicago-Kent College of Law
- Occupations: Lawyer, stockbroker
- Spouse: Mae Isabel Mayer (m. 1906)
- Children: 1 son, 1 daughter

Leopold Koretz (1879–1925) was an American lawyer who ran an elaborate Ponzi scheme in Chicago, called the "Bayano oil fraud," which garnered an estimated $30 million (about $450 million today) from dozens of investors in Chicago. The scheme used fraudulent claims of oil interests in Panama in a criminal career that predated and outlasted his contemporary, Charles Ponzi. Koretz was so trusted and admired that after Ponzi's fraud was exposed in 1920, his investors nicknamed him "Our Ponzi," never suspecting they were being duped as well.

== Early life and family ==
Leopold Koretz was born to German Jewish parents on July 30, 1879, in Rokycany, Bohemia, the seventh of nine children. He arrived in the United States in 1887, at age 8.

The family settled in Chicago. Koretz, who preferred the name Leo, was a star debater at Lakeview High School. He studied at night and graduated from the Chicago-Kent College of Law in June 1901.

== Career ==
One of Koretz's associates when he began the practice of law was Robert E. Crowe, who as the Cook County state's attorney would later investigate Koretz and arrange for his arrest.

Koretz's swindling career began in 1905, when he forged and sold a series of mortgages on non-existent properties, using the proceeds in a Ponzi scheme to cover interest payments and finance an opulent lifestyle. He soon graduated to land speculation in Arkansas, peddling more fake mortgages and bogus stock in eastern Arkansas rice farms. In 1911 Koretz began selling stock in the Bayano River Syndicate, which he claimed controlled millions of acres of prime timberland in a remote region of Panama. His announcement of the "discovery" of oil on the property in 1921—and a promise of 60-percent annual returns—sparked a stock-buying frenzy in which many investors begged Koretz for a chance to purchase shares. The scheme was exposed in November 1923 when a group of Koretz's wealthy investors traveled to Panama to see the purported oil operations and discovered the fraud.

Koretz fled to New York City, and then to Nova Scotia, Canada in the spring of 1924, where he posed as Lou Keyte (pronounced Keet), a wealthy retiree and literary figure. He purchased and renovated the secluded Pinehurst Lodge near present-day Kejimkujik National Park, in southwestern Nova Scotia, where he lavishly entertained a new circle of friends that included the future Canadian author Thomas Raddall. Koretz never crossed paths with another Nova Scotia visitor that summer, the adventure novelist Zane Grey, whose work he falsely claimed credit for promoting among New York publishers.

Koretz was identified and arrested in Halifax on November 23, 1924, through a suit he had brought to a tailor for repair of the lining, on which a label with his real name was sewn in along with the name of the Chicago clothier from whom it had been purchased. Choosing not to fight extradition, he was returned under escort to Chicago where he pleaded guilty.

Charles Ponzi is said to have swindled investors out of $20 million in 1920 ($300 million in current dollars), in a con immortalized as a Ponzi scheme. Leo Koretz is estimated from 1905 through 1923 to have bilked his family members and other unsuspecting investors of $30 million, equivalent to $450 million today. By comparison, the victims of Bernard Madoff's Ponzi schemes between the early 1990s and 2008 were believed by the U.S. Security Investors Protection Corporation to have lost as much as $65 billion.

== Personal life ==
Koretz married into a comfortable German Jewish family on January 30, 1906. Koretz and his wife, the former Mae Isabel Mayer, had a son, Mentor (later known as Red Kearns), and a daughter, Mari.

== Death ==
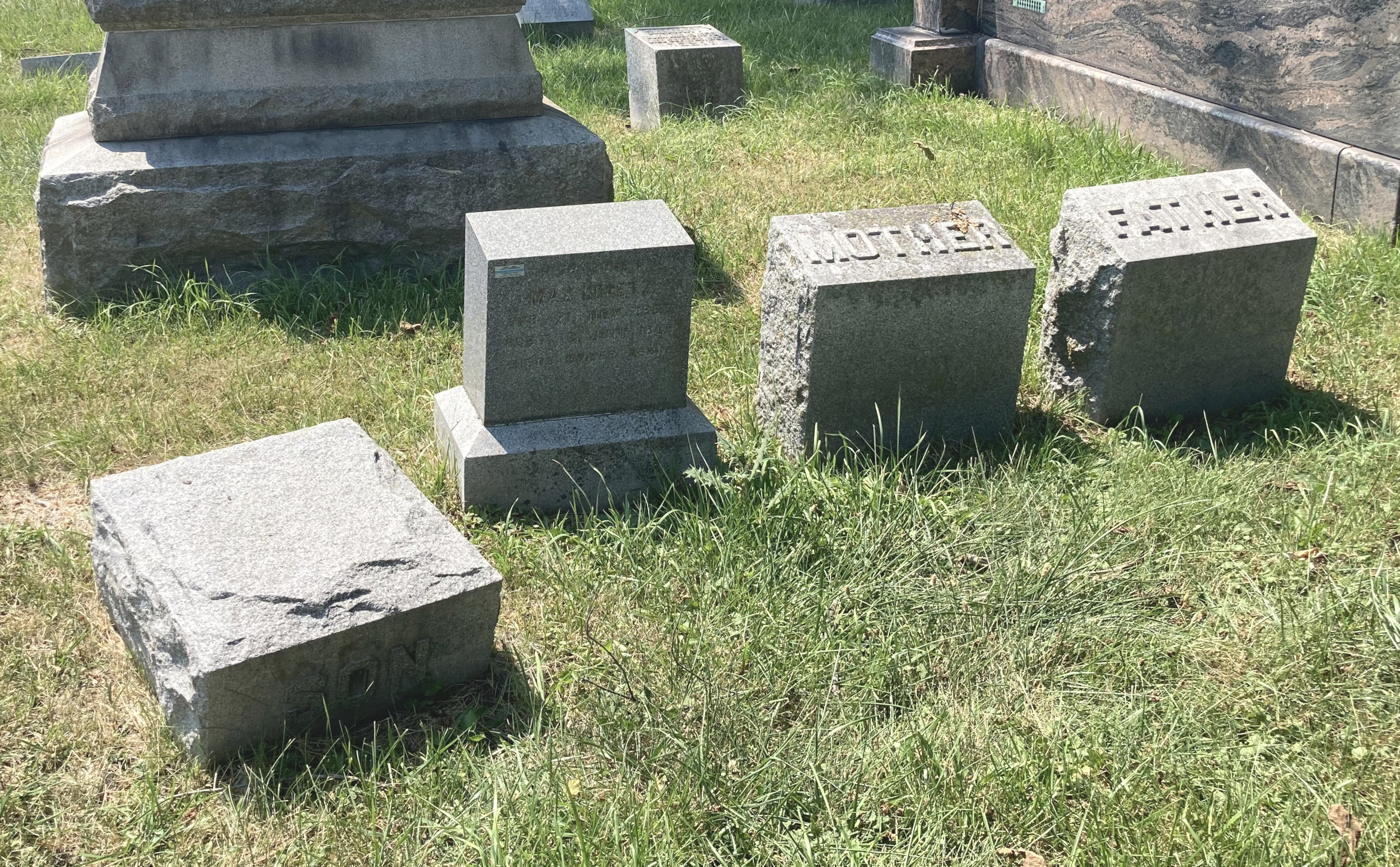
Koretz's grave at Waldheim Cemetery Co.

Shortly after he was sent to the state prison in Joliet, the 45-year-old Koretz, who had been diabetic since 1919, died on January 8, 1925. Sources vary on his cause of death: one says his death occurred after several days spent at the prison hospital, following an ongoing decline in his health, where his treatment had included injections of insulin in an effort to stay the disease. Another theory suggests that his death was a suicide, in which he died after eating an entire box of smuggled-in chocolates with the intention of triggering a fatal diabetic coma.

Koretz was buried the following afternoon in a Jewish graveside service at Waldheim Cemetery Co. in Forest Park, Illinois. Reporter Genevieve Forbes Herrick wrote in the Chicago Tribune,

“Leo Koretz, the $2,000,000 con man whose lavish pageant of life had piled climax on climax with amazing result, was buried yesterday in a funeral ceremony that was a distinct and, perhaps, a significant anti-climax. An open grave; a handful of relatives standing about in the snow waiting for the body to come from the Joliet penitentiary; a gray casket in a gray hearse; Koretz’s brother and son riding with the undertaker; a bunch of pink roses splattered with clay; a wreath tossed to one side; the widow sobbing over the loss that came more than a year ago; a rabbi repeating the regular service. And it was over. No crowds; no elaborate funeral cortege; no pallbearers; no heaped up flowers; still fewer heaped up eulogies. Nothing but the minimum for the man who always loved the maximum.”
