= Kayla Laserson =

American epidemiologist

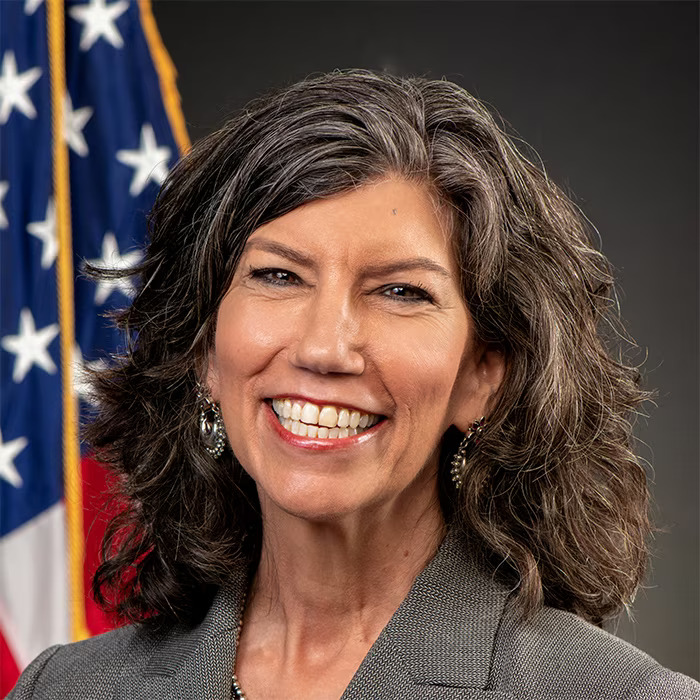
- Laserson in 2023
- Education: Harvard University
- Scientific career
- Fields: Infectious disease epidemiology
- Workplaces: Centers for Disease Control and Prevention; Kenya Medical Research Institute; Bill & Melinda Gates Foundation
- Uniformed service
- Allegiance: United States
- Branch: PHS Commissioned Corps
- Service years: until 2007
- Rank: Commander

Kayla F. Laserson is an American epidemiologist who served as the director of the Global Health Center at the Centers for Disease Control and Prevention (CDC) from July 2023 to April 2025. She was previously the deputy director for Infectious Diseases and Vaccine Delivery, India Office of the Bill & Melinda Gates Foundation. Laserson served as a commander in the United States Public Health Service Commissioned Corps until 2007.

== Life ==
Laserson earned a bachelor's degree from Harvard College and a Doctor of Science in infectious disease epidemiology from the Harvard T.H. Chan School of Public Health. Her 1997 dissertation was titled, The dynamics of malaria infection and disease among the Venezuelan Yanomami Amerindians.

Laserson worked in the CDC's Division of Tuberculosis Elimination (DTBE), where she started her career as an Epidemic Intelligence Service (EIS) officer in DTBE's International Research and Program Branch in 1997 and later became the branch's deputy branch chief. She worked in Mexico, Brazil, Russia, Latvia, and Vietnam. Laserson served as a commander in the United States Public Health Service Commissioned Corps until 2007. She was the director of the Kenya Medical Research Institute/CDC Research and Public Health Collaboration in Kisumu from 2006 to 2013. As director, she managed a research platform in HIV, malaria, TB, emerging infectious diseases, demographic surveillance, and programmatic service delivery of HIV care, treatment, and prevention programs.

Laserson was the CDC India Country Director and the CDC India Division of Global Health Protection program director for six years, based in Delhi. In these roles, she oversaw CDC's platform in India, provided technical assistance to support India's developing role in global health security, oversaw partnerships and collaborations with the government of India, and directed CDC's scientific strategy in India. She also served as the CDC resident advisor and helped build the India Epidemic Intelligence Service Program.

Laserson served as the deputy director for Infectious Diseases and Vaccine Delivery, India Office of the Bill & Melinda Gates Foundation (BMGF) where she focused on programmatic support to the government of India and partners on TB, neglected tropical diseases, malaria, and vaccine delivery. She also led the BMGF's COVID-19 response in India from 2020 to 2022.

In July 2023, Laserson became director for the CDC Global Health Center (GHC) where she coordinated the agency's global efforts to protect and improve health through science, policy, partnership, and evidence-based public health action. Her tenure ended on April 1, 2025.
