= Meyer Levin =

American novelist, playwright and journalist (1905–1981)

Meyer Levin (Hebrew: מאיר לוין; October 7, 1905 – July 9, 1981) was an American novelist. Perhaps best known for his work on the Leopold and Loeb case, Levin worked as a journalist (for the Chicago Daily News and from 1933 to 1939, he worked as an editor for Esquire).

== Career ==
Levin was born in Chicago. He published six novels before World War II. Even though the critical response to them was good, none of them were financially successful. Reporter (1929) was a novel of the modern newspapers, Frankie and Johnny (1930) an urban romance, Yehuda (1931) takes place on a kibbutz, and The New Bridge (1933) dealt with unemployed construction workers at the beginning of the Depression. In 1937, Levin published The Old Bunch, a story of immigrant Chicago Jewry that James T. Farrell called "one of the most serious and ambitious novels yet produced by the current generation of American novelists." Citizens (1940) was a fictional account of the 1937 strike at the Republic Steel Company plant outside Chicago.

He also wrote and directed a documentary titled The Illegals , for the Office Of War Information. The film dealt with the smuggling of Jews out of Poland.

Levin was a war correspondent in Europe during World War II, representing the Overseas News Agency and the Jewish Telegraphic Agency.

After the war, Levin wrote, with the approval of the Frank family, a play which was based on The Diary of Anne Frank, but his play was not produced. Instead, another version of the same story which was dramatized by Frances Goodrich and Albert Hackett reached Broadway. Levin sued for plagiarism.

Meyer wrote the 1956 novel Compulsion, inspired by the Leopold and Loeb case. The novel, for which Levin was given a Special Edgar Award by the Mystery Writers of America in 1957, was the basis for Levin's own 1957 play adaptation and the 1959 film which was based on it, starring Orson Welles. Compulsion was "the first 'documentary' or 'non-fiction novel' ("a style later used in Truman Capote's In Cold Blood and Norman Mailer's The Executioner's Song").

Levin died in Jerusalem.

== Bibliography ==
=== Novels ===
- The Reporter (1929)
- Frankie and Johnny (1930)
- Yehuda (1931)
- The Golden Mountain: Marvelous Tales of Rabbi Israel Baal Shem and of his Great-Grandson, Rabbi Nachman, Retold from Hebrew, Yiddish and German Sources (1932)
- The New Bridge (1933)
- The Old Bunch (1937)
- Citizens (1940)
- My Father's House (1947)
- Compulsion (1956)
- Eva (1959)
- The Fanatic (1964)
- The Stronghold (1965)
- Gore and Igor (1968)
- The Settlers (1972)
- The Spell of Time (1974)
- The Harvest (1978)
- The Architect (1981), (fictionalized life of Frank Lloyd Wright)
- "Classic Chassidic Tales" (1932), a gathering of the scattered legends of Baal Shem Tov

=== Autobiographical works ===
- In Search (1949)
- The Obsession (1974)

=== Judaica ===
- Beginnings in Jewish Philosophy
- The Story of Israel
- An Israel Haggadah for Passover
- The Story of the Synagogue
- The Story of the Jewish Way of Life
- Hassidic Stories

== Awards ==
- 1966: National Jewish Book Award for The Stronghold
- 1967: National Jewish Book Award for The Story of Israel

== See also ==
- Gabriel Levin, his son
- Tereska Torres, his wife
