= The Girls in 3-B =

1959 lesbian pulp fiction novel by Valerie Taylor

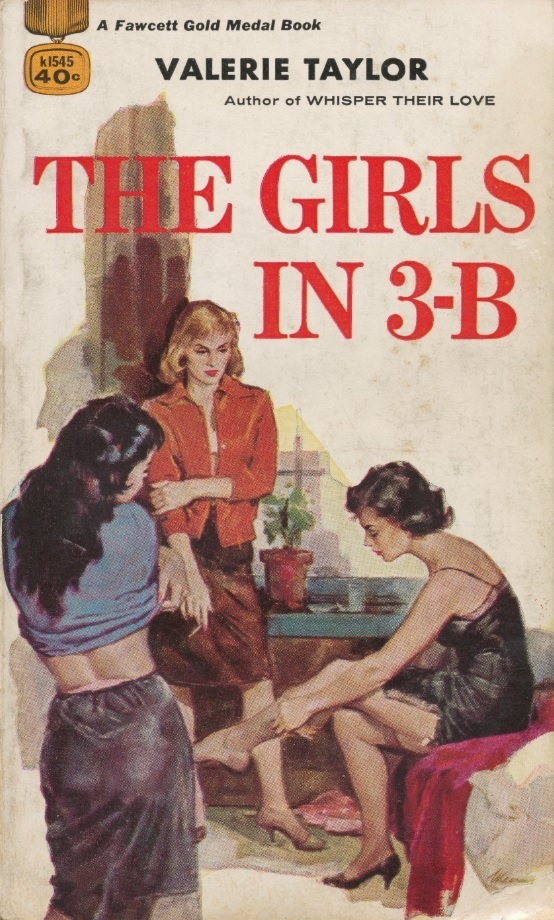
- 1959 cover by James Alfred Meese
- Author: Valerie Taylor
- Published: 1959 (Fawcett Publications)

The Girls in 3-B is a classic work of lesbian pulp fiction by Valerie Taylor which was published in 1959 by Fawcett. Its happy ending for a lesbian character was unusual for the time period. It was one of the first three novels of any pulp fiction genre to be reprinted in 2003 by Feminist Press.

== Plot ==
Three eighteen-year-old women, Annice, Pat, and Barby, leave their rural Iowa town and move to Chicago to find jobs and an apartment together. Each falls in love and must make a decision about whether to accept or reject the contemporary morality of the 1950s, which pressures them to make traditional marriages as young as possible. The book deals with themes of rape, incest, racism, abortion, closeted sexuality, workplace discrimination and sexual harassment, and recreational drugs. It explores the Beat culture, "satirizing [its] sexism and machismo".

== Reception and impact ==
In the afterword to the 2003 edition, Lisa Walker, associate professor of English at the University of Southern Maine, called it "part of the unofficial history of women in the 1950s". Barbara Grier, in her annual survey of lesbian literature, The Lesbian in Literature: A Bibliography, gave the book three asterisks, indicating it was "among the few titles that stand out above all the rest and must properly belong to any collection of Lesbian literature." Curve said Taylor "depict(s) a world where the stereotypical image of the 1950's female is turned on its head." Publishers Weekly, reviewing the 2003 edition, says, "This is a refreshing entry for the genre, mercifully devoid of the moralistic and cautionary elements common in much 1950s pulp." The New York Times called it a "delicious [example] of the pulp genre". Literary scholar Michelle Ann Abate called it out, along with Spring Fire and The Price of Salt, as a book that had become an "important source of identity" among the lesbian community in the 1950s.

Most early works of lesbian pulp fiction were cautionary tales that warned women lesbianism was immoral. Lillian Faderman wrote that they "warned females that lesbianism was sick or evil and that if a woman dared to love another woman she would end up lonely and suicidal." According to Walker, The Girls in 3-B, like other early works of lesbian pulp fiction authored by women, was among the first to "treat lesbianism sympathetically". Literary scholar Maureen Corrigan in a review of the book for NPR said the book was one of the few pre-Stonewall novels in which lesbian characters do not kill themselves. According to Walker, "Barby's story provides a remarkably positive representation of lesbianism for the time period, especially in contrast to the novel's relatively negative representations of heterosexual experiences." Walker writes, "Lesbianism here is presented as sheltering and nurturing, and it allows Barby the economic and emotional security of a heterosexual marriage, without the danger of rape, pregnancy, and abortion" and that "Barby's discovery of lesbianism is self-affirming". Walker calls the book "remarkable in providing a happy ending for the lesbian character", particularly for the time and genre. Go called it "a positive, non-exploitive look at lesbian life in an era when lesbians were not supposed to have positive, non-exploitive existences." David Ulin, writing for the Los Angeles Times, said that "by writing about a lesbian couple that stay together, [Taylor] violated the standards of the genre, which dictated unhappy endings for those who ignored the mores of straight society."

Walker points out that while Annice's first sexual experience is fully described, including penetration, the description of Barby's first sexual experience breaks off with an invitation to spend the night and resumes with the two women, after sex, watching a snowfall through the bedroom window. She says that while contemporary readers may see this as "a capitulation to the 1950s taboo around representing lesbians, and a reinforcement of the cultural invisibility of lesbianism", she finds it more probable that Taylor, a lesbian herself, was avoiding fulfilling male readers' voyeuristic expectations, at the time common in lesbian pulp fiction. Literary scholar Yvonne Keller agrees, referring to Taylor as a "paradigmatic example" of a lesbian writer who refused to provide the genre's expected voyeuristic opportunities for men. Walker concludes that "according to this argument, then, Taylor takes advantage of pulp's ability to provide lesbians with images of themselves while resisting ... the most exploitative patterns of representation in lesbian pulp."

Walker also points out that Taylor provided a psychological "explanation" of Barby's lesbianism in the character's story, which includes a rape at age 13 and another at 18, and that a history of rape was common in the lives of lesbian characters in Taylor's other books, but says that Taylor refused to present lesbianism as a neurosis. Keller named Taylor as one of a small group of writers whose work formed the subgenre of "pro-lesbian" pulp fiction; others include Ann Bannon, Sloane Britain, Paula Christian, Joan Ellis, March Hastings, Marjorie Lee, Della Martin, Rea Michaels, Claire Morgan, Vin Packer, Randy Salem, Artemis Smith, Tereska Torres, and Shirley Verel.

Curve noted that the lesbian plotline is not the central theme of the book, but that nevertheless the book was labelled lesbian pulp.

== In popular culture ==
According to NPR, the comic strip Apartment 3-G was loosely based on the book. In season 3 of the American television series Riverdale, Veronica is seen reading a copy.

== Publication history ==
The Girls in 3-B was first published by Fawcett Crest in 1959 with cover art by James Alfred Meese. It was reprinted in 1965 by Fawcett Gold Medal. It appeared with a new foreword and afterword in 2003 from Feminist Press, one of the first three novels of any pulp fiction genre in their Femmes Fatales imprint.
