= Tereska Torrès =

French writer (1920–2012)

- Born: Tereska Szwarc; 3 September 1920; Paris, France
- Died: 20 September 2012 (aged 92); Paris, France
- Occupation: writer
- Spouse(s): Georges Torrès; Meyer Levin
- Children: Dominique Torres, Gabriel Levin, Mikael Levin
- Parent(s): Guina and Marek Szwarc
- Relatives: Samuel Schwarz (uncle)

Tereska Torrès (born Tereska Szwarc; 3 September 1920 – 20 September 2012) was a French writer known for the 1950 book Women's Barracks, the first "original paperback bestseller." In 2008, historians credited the republished book as the first pulp fiction book published in America to candidly address lesbian relationships, although Torrès did not agree with this analysis.

== Early life ==
Torrès was born Tereska Szwarc to the Jewish-Polish sculptor Marek Szwarc and his wife Guina Pinkus in Paris. Her paternal uncle Samuel Schwarz was a noted historian of the Jewish diaspora and crypto-Judaism.

== Second World War ==
Torrès fled her native country in 1940 via Lisbon to England when France surrendered to Nazi Germany after the Battle of France, while her father—serving in the Polish Armed Forces in the West—was evacuated from La Rochelle by the British Home Fleet. Her family was able to escape because they received transit visas signed by Portuguese vice-consul Manuel Vieira Braga (following instructions from Aristides de Sousa Mendes) in Bayonne, France, in June 1940. It is possible the efforts and intervention of Samuel Schwarz, who resided in Portugal, helped secure the visas.

At age 19, Torrès enlisted in the Corps des Volontaires françaises of Charles de Gaulle's Free French Forces and worked as a secretary in de Gaulle's London headquarters. In October 1944, when she was five months pregnant, her first husband—20-year-old Georges Torrès, the stepson of prewar French-Jewish Prime Minister Léon Blum—died while fighting with the 2nd Free French Armoured Division in Lorraine.

== Post war ==
In 1947, Torrès accompanied American novelist Meyer Levin while he filmed the documentary Lo Tafhidunu (The Illegals) about Jewish refugees who fled Poland after the Holocaust and tried to reach Palestine. Her diary about her experiences on this journey—from Poland's destroyed cities through the displaced persons camps in Western Europe to Israel and her imprisonment there by British forces—has so far only been published in German, under the title Unerschrocken (Unafraid).

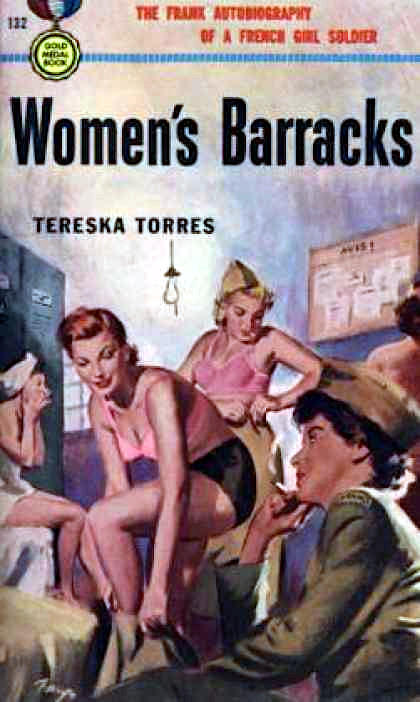
1950 cover

== Writing career ==
In 1948, Torrès married Meyer Levin in Paris. He urged her to publish the diary she wrote while serving in the Free French Forces. In 1950, Torrès published the book Women's Barracks in the United States. A fictional account of her wartime experiences, it "quickly became the first paperback original bestseller," selling over two million copies in its first five years. In total, four million copies of the book were sold in the United States, and it was translated into 13 different languages.

In 1952, the House Select Committee on Current Pornographic Materials used Women's Barracks as an example of how paperback books promoted moral degeneracy. When New York-based The Feminist Press republished the book in 2003, it was acclaimed as having inspired a whole new genre of lesbian and feminist literature in the United States. Torrès was credited with writing the first book to candidly address lesbian relationships in America. However, she felt the book was innocent and that her publishers had exploited her.

Torrès did not allow Women's Barracks to be published in France during her lifetime because she felt readers might come away thinking Free French Forces acted frivolously in London. A revised edition was released in 2002. And her wartime diary was instead published as Une Française Libre (A Free Frenchwoman).

In 1963, Torrès accompanied Levin to Ethiopia where he filmed The Fellashas, the first documentary about the life of Beta Israel Jews in Ambover.

Torrès wrote 14 additional books, which Levin often translated into English. Her still-unpublished diary notebooks are preserved by Boston University as part of Levin's papers.

Torrès died on 20 September 2012 in Paris. She was one of the last surviving members of the Volontaires françaises, the women's army corps of the Free French Forces.

== Works ==
- Le Sable et l'Écume ("Sand and Foam") – 1945 by Gallimard, using the pen name George Achard. She started her first novel when she was 17 years old and completed it during the war.
- Women's Barracks – 1950 by Fawcett's Gold Medal; the first lesbian pulp novel. A modified French version of the book was released in 2011 under the title Jeunes Femmes en Uniforme.
- Not Yet – 1957
- The Dangerous Games – 1957
- The Golden Cage – 1959
- By Cécile – 1963, about a woman who steals her husband's mistress.
- The Converts – 1970 by Knopf (New York); an account of her childhood and youth, and her parents' secret conversion to Catholicism in 1919. Released in French in 2002 under the title Le Choix (The Choice).
- Les Poupées de Cendre – 1972 by Éditions du Seuil and Éditions Phébus; a novel set in Israel.
- Les Maisons Hantées de Meyer Levin – 1974 by Éditions Phébus (Paris); about her husband's 30-year-long obsession with a play he wrote based on The Diary of Anne Frank.
- Une Française Libre – 2000 by Phebus (London); a diary of her war years.
- Mission Secrète – 2012, about her efforts to help Ethiopian Jews emigrate to Israel.

== Legacy ==
In 2019 a public garden called jardin Tereska Torrès-Levin (Tereska Torrès-Levin Garden) was dedicated to her memory in Paris. This memorial park is situated in the central 8th arrondissement of Paris on Rue Laure Diebold between the Champs-Élysées and Parc Monceau. Torrès is named by literary scholar Yvonne Keller as one of a small group of writers whose work formed the subgenre of "pro-lesbian" pulp fiction; others include Ann Bannon, Sloane Britain, Paula Christian, Joan Ellis, March Hastings, Marjorie Lee, Della Martin, Rea Michaels, Claire Morgan, Vin Packer, Randy Salem, Artemis Smith, Valerie Taylor, and Shirley Verel.
