= Lesbian pulp fiction =

Genre of fiction

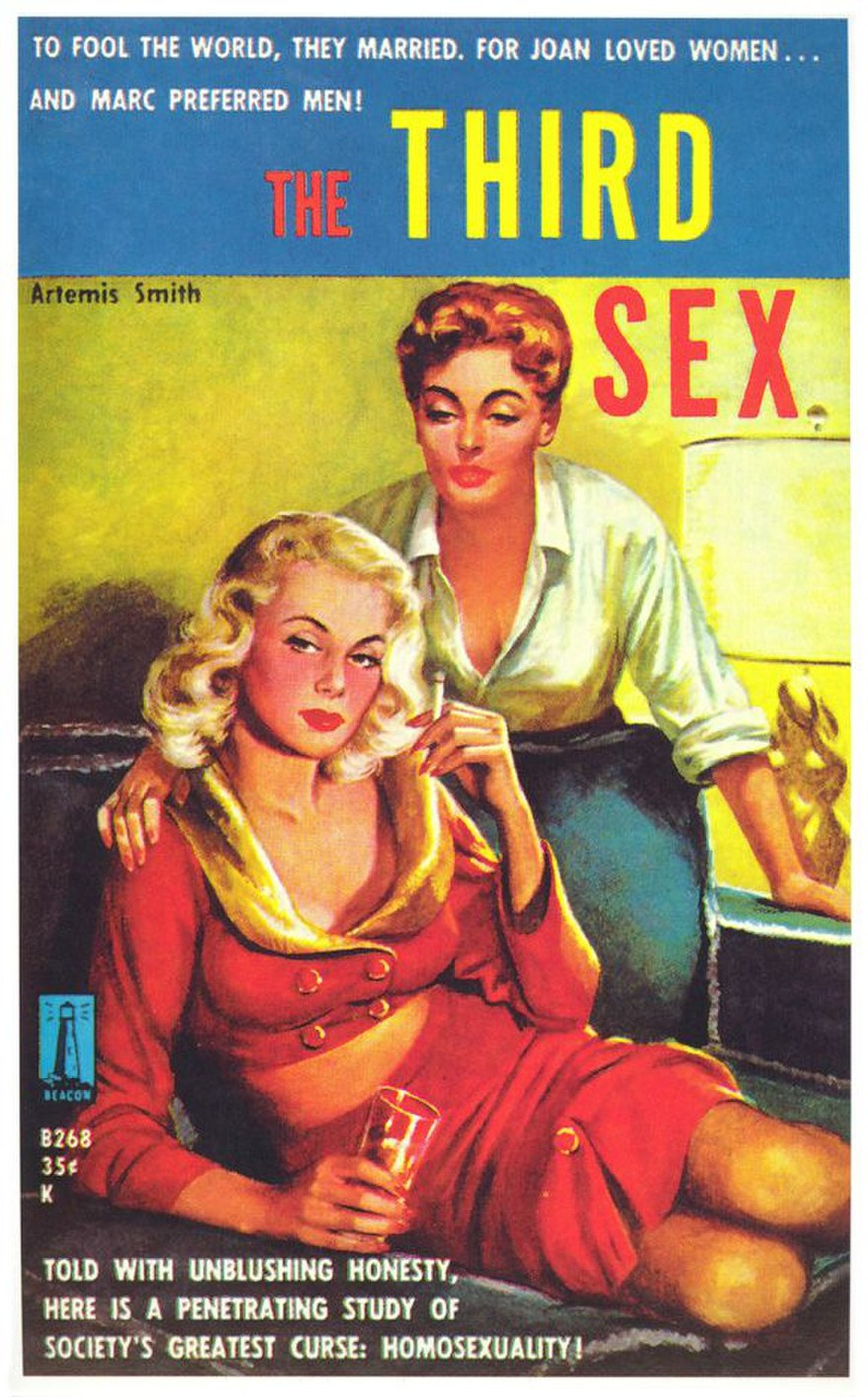
Cover of 1959 lesbian pulp fiction novel The Third Sex by Artemis Smith

Lesbian pulp fiction is a genre of lesbian literature that refers to any mid-20th century paperback novel or pulp magazine with overtly lesbian themes and content. Lesbian pulp fiction was published in the 1950s and 1960s by many of the same paperback publishing houses as other genres of fiction, including westerns, romances, and detective fiction. Because very little other literature was available for and about lesbians at this time, quite often these books were the only reference the public (lesbian and otherwise) had for modeling what lesbians were. English professor Stephanie Foote commented on the importance of lesbian pulp novels to the lesbian identity prior to the rise of organized feminism: "Pulps have been understood as signs of a secret history of readers, and they have been valued because they have been read. The more they are read, the more they are valued, and the more they are read, the closer the relationship between the very act of circulation and reading and the construction of a lesbian community becomes…. Characters use the reading of novels as a way to understand that they are not alone." Joan Nestle refers to lesbian pulp fiction as “survival literature.” Lesbian pulp fiction provided representation for lesbian identities, brought a surge of awareness to lesbians, and created space for lesbian organizing leading up to Stonewall.

These books were sold at drugstores, magazine stands, bus terminals and other places where one might look to purchase cheap, consumable entertainment. The books were small enough to fit in a purse or back pocket (hence both the brand-name and the generalized term "pocket books") and cheap enough to throw away when the reader was through with them.

== Development of the genre ==
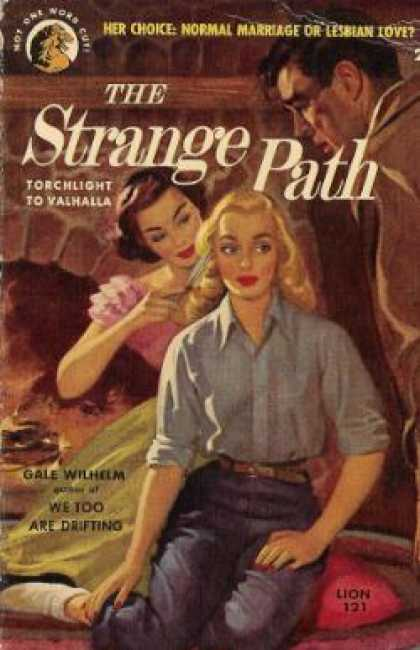
1953 cover of The Strange Path by Gale Wilhelm (illustration by Robert Maguire), originally published as Torchlight to Valhalla in 1938

In the early to mid-20th century, only a handful of books were published that addressed lesbians as characters in relationships with women. Those notable novels were published in hardcover and were as follows:

- The Well of Loneliness (1928) Radclyffe Hall, Jonathan Cape
- We Too Are Drifting (1935) Gale Wilhelm, Random House
- Pity for Women (1937) Helen Anderson, Doubleday
- Torchlight to Valhalla (1938, later titled The Strange Path when reissued in paperback in 1953) Gale Wilhem, Random House

During World War II, the military distributed small paperbacks to its forces, causing a large population of Americans to become accustomed to having access to cheap books and thus creating a demand for the same easy access to reading material when the soldiers returned home. As a result, in the years after the war, there appeared a new and often subversive trend in publishing that allowed for books to be written, cheaply produced, and widely distributed using technology previously unavailable. These books were dubbed "pulp" fiction because they were inexpensive and usually sensational or low-brow, much like the "pulp" magazines of the first half of the 20th century. Pulps were not necessarily "low brow." Many pulp authors are now celebrated with commemorative hardcover editions. These mass market paperbacks, printed and bound on cheap paper, often addressed "dirty" topics like drugs, gangs, white slavery, crime, murder, and homosexuality. Because the literature was not respected, it was not censored as readily, although most of the larger paperback publishers were wary of postal censorship, and, for instance, took care not to publish works that were overly supportive of "deviant" lifestyles. In terms of lesbian fiction, these books were the only ones available in many locations to people who had no previous access to information or stories that involved lesbian characters.

Several publishing houses created special imprints, such as Fawcett's "Gold Medal" division, to satisfy the demand for pulp fiction. Unlike many publishers, Fawcett made a point of publishing lesbian pulp written by lesbians, or sometimes by heterosexual women, rather than by heterosexual men. It made a significant contribution to the lesbian community to have lesbian authors writing more or less authentic stories about what it was like to be a lesbian, as opposed to only having heterosexual men writing stories about lesbians for the titillation of other men. During the time it was unlikely for most lesbians to find a “happily ever after” outside of these pulps, which still often ended unhappily and were explicitly homophobic. Many lesbians were fueled by this to write their own pulps and defy these norms for the genre.

With the publishing of Women’s Barracks in 1950 began the emergence of “the golden age” of lesbian pulps. Hundreds of lesbian pulp titles were published between 1950 and 1969, and millions of copies of each title were often sold. This was part of no social agenda on the publishers' parts: they were making quite a bit of money. However prevalent the books were, purchasing and reading them for many women was the equivalent to coming out to the cashier. Author Joan Nestle called them "survival books" and described purchasing them:

The act of taking one of these books off the drugstore rack and paying for it at the counter was a frightening and difficult move for most women. This was especially true during the atmosphere of the McCarthy trials...Although tame by today's standards...these volumes were so threatening then that women hid them, burnt them, and threw them out.

=== Women's Barracks ===
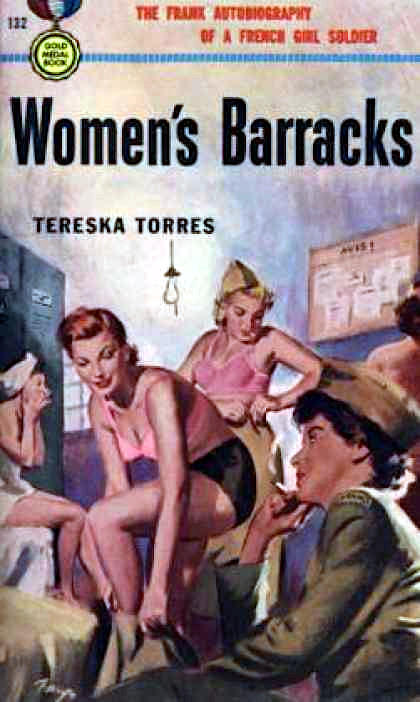
Cover of Women's Barracks (1950) by Tereska Torrès

The first paperback to address a lesbian relationship was published as early as 1950 with Women's Barracks by Tereska Torrès, published by Gold Medal Books. The story was a fictionalized account of Torres' experiences in the Free French Forces in London during World War II. Women's Barracks sold 4 million copies and was selected in 1952 to become an example of how paperback books were promoting moral degeneracy by the House Select Committee on Current Pornographic Materials. The Committee concluded their investigation with a report that required publishers to conform to certain moral standards in the content and publicizing of their books, or else face fines or imprisonment. As a result, authors were forced to limit their stories to fit these requirements. However, as the decade went on, publishers became bolder in printing material that might be judged as immoral.

=== Spring Fire and the establishment of a formula ===
After the success of Women's Barracks, Gold Medal Books published another paperback with lesbian themes, Spring Fire. Golden Medal Books eventually published some of the least homophobic books in the genre.

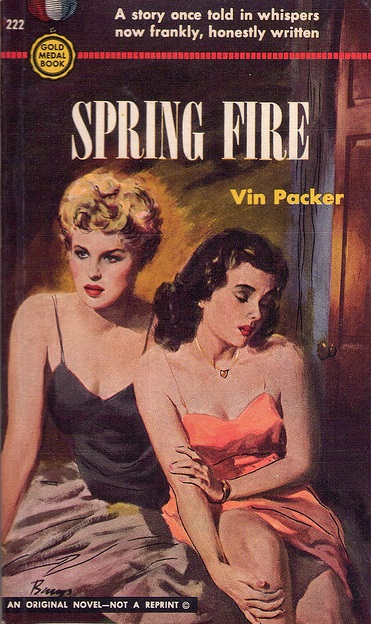
Cover of Spring Fire (1952) by Vin Packer (a.k.a. Marijane Meaker)

Spring Fire, by Marijane Meaker written under the pseudonym "Vin Packer," is considered to be the first lesbian paperback novel, since the plot focused on the relationship of the two main characters, as opposed to the various relationships examined in Women's Barracks. It is also the first modern lesbian novel written by a lesbian. Spring Fire, which was published by Gold Medal Books in 1952 and sold more than 1.5 million copies, is about two college girls, Mitch and Leda, who fall in love and have an affair. Spring Fire inspired one of the best-known authors of lesbian pulp, Ann Bannon. Bannon wrote to Meaker after reading the novel, and Meaker convinced her to submit her own manuscript to Gold Medal Books for publication in the genre.

The tragic endings of Women's Barracks and Spring Fire (suicide and insanity) are typical of lesbian pulp novels. Meaker was told by her editor that because the books traveled through the mail and anything sent through the U.S. Postal Service was subject to government censorship, publishers had to make sure that the books seemed in no way to proselytize homosexuality. No character was allowed to be both homosexual and happy at the story's end. A character had either to turn heterosexual and end up coupled with a man or, if she remained homosexual, suffer death, insanity or some equally unappealing fate.

The first exception to this formula, and technically not a pulp fiction, is the 1952 romance novel The Price of Salt by Patricia Highsmith, published in hardcover by Coward-McCann under the pseudonym of "Claire Morgan". It was republished in 1953 as a Bantam Books lesbian pulp fiction paperback. Satisfactory endings for women who accepted their homosexuality were rare.

Some authors defied the tragic endings. Ann Bannon published six lesbian novels between 1957 and 1962, a series known as the Beebo Brinker Chronicles. Bannon's novels ended happily, which changed the societal perception of lesbianism. Rather than being seen as "neurotic, frigid, immature, and even psychotic", lesbians were viewed as warm and loving. Bannon's novels paved the way for social acceptance of lesbianism and the queer sexual revolution.

== Content ==
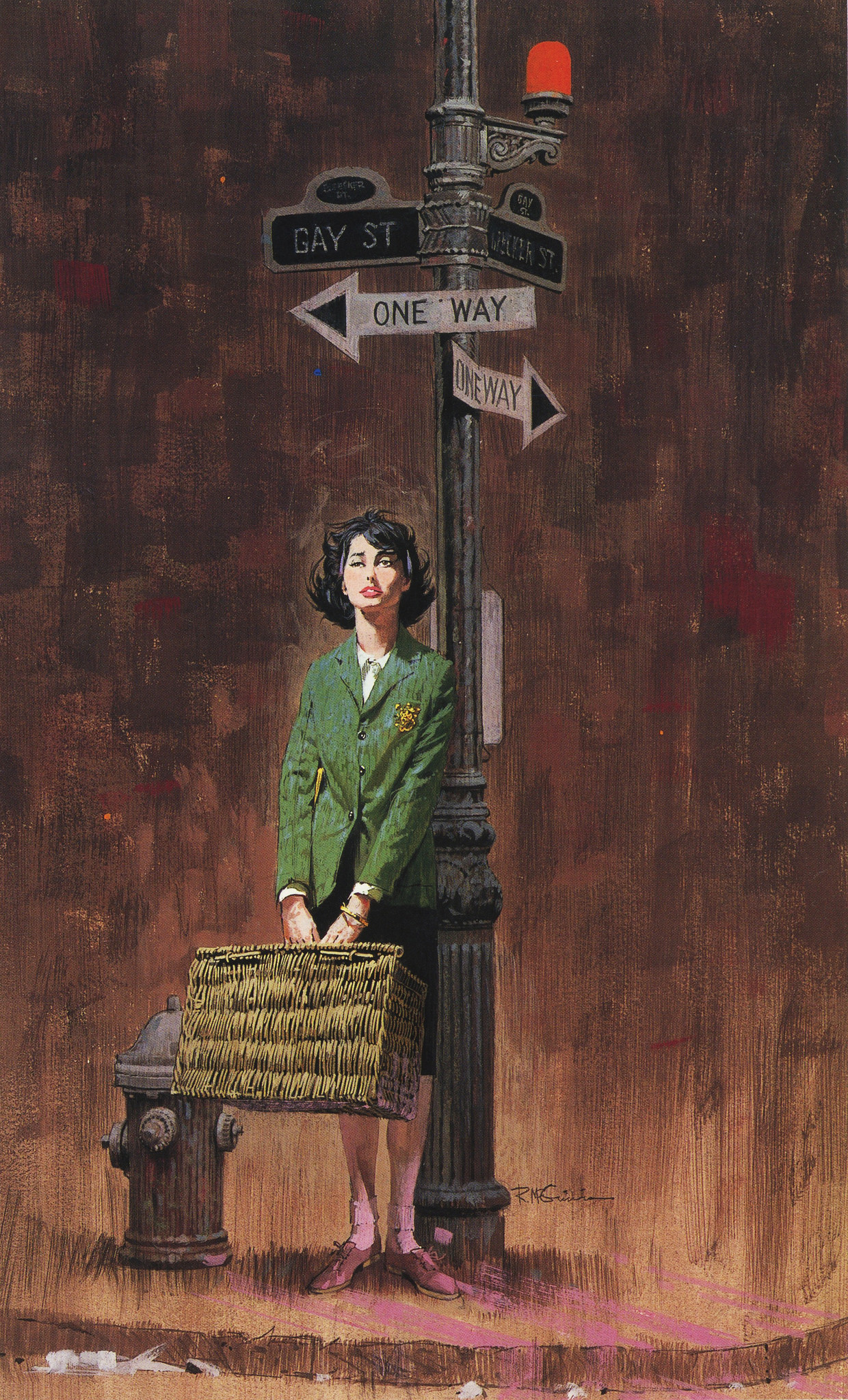
Beebo Brinker (1962) by Ann Bannon

Content and quality of the books varied widely. Writer Yvonne Keller divides books within the lesbian pulp fiction genre into subclasses she labels "pro-lesbian" and "virile adventures". Pro-lesbian paperbacks were generally written about and by women, featured a love story between women, had fairly well-developed characters, and tended not to feature gratuitous or graphic sexual encounters. Virile adventures were more male centered, perhaps with at least one male main character, and featured graphic depictions of sex. According to Keller, the difference between pro-lesbian and virile adventure novels could often be seen on the front covers of the books. Pro-lesbian novels featured covers that were much less sexual, with women typically fully clothed and alone, such as seen on the cover of Beebo Brinker. Because of their tame covers, pro-lesbian novels generally relied on subtle cues to hint at their lesbian content. Virile adventures, on the other hand, had covers that were considerably more sexualized, and would frequently feature men in the pictures, conveying their voyeuristic natures.

Between 1952 and 1957, only virile adventures were published and pro-lesbian fiction started to emerge after 1957. The cause for this surge of the new subclass was due to pro-lesbian authors reading virile adventure stories. Virile adventures were homophobic, voyeuristic, and focused on catering to the male audience.

A trend virile adventures followed near the end of their stories is a reclaiming of morality, specifically pertaining to heterosexual norms. While authors and publishers were constrained with presenting ideological moral codes to their audiences, these virile adventures presented lesbianism as both temporal and unnatural. Everything would circulate back to the idea that virile adventures needed to end within the throes of heterosexuality to counteract the effects lesbianism could have had on its audiences.

Due to their popularity, these books set the standard of what consisted of lesbian pulp fiction, accounting for about 85% of the genre. Pro-lesbian authors focused on subverting the norm with stories that weren't homophobic, focusing on the relationship between the couple and ending the story where they officially were together. Author Paula Christian described her inspiration to write during this period: "Contemporary fiction showed such instability, violence, and sensationalism...I simply wanted to show the other side." Despite how much virile adventures consisted of the genre, pro-lesbian books are the most loved and re-published in the genre.

However, the majority of books in the lesbian paperback fiction genre promoted myths about lesbians and lesbianism. Women who are left without men can be seduced and violated by predatory lesbians (usually butch women). The depictions of lesbianism in prison, the military, and boarding schools was a well-used motif. Lesbianism was often linked to other topics that were seen as salacious or shocking at the time: witchcraft, Satanism, bondage and discipline, orgies, and voyeurism. Many "lesbian" pulps actually depict characters who may now be read as bisexual and who end up in heterosexual relationships at the end of their stories. During this time, however, bisexuality was seen less as a permanent identity and more as a stepping-stone to homosexuality or to various forms of sexual promiscuity.

The vast majority of characters in lesbian pulp were white. Rea Michaels, writer of novels including Cloak of Evil and Duet in Darkness, stands out as one of the few pulp authors to include people of color and interracial relationships in her books and to have representations of lesbians of color on the covers of her novels.

Barbara Grier, who started Naiad Press, called the years between 1950 and 1965 the "Golden Age of Lesbian Pulp Fiction". Grier republished many of the books in this span in the 1980s under Naiad, and Cleis Press and Feminist Press have again reissued them. Several writers of this "Golden Age" stood out for their contributions to gay and lesbian literature and their formation of a lesbian identity prior to the advent of feminism.

== Authors ==
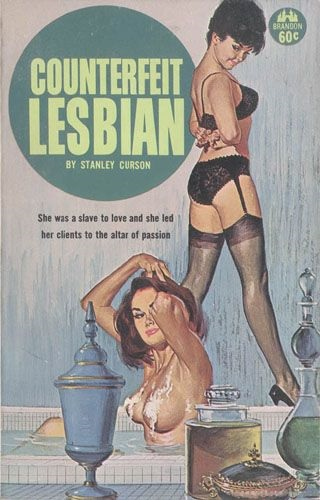
Cover of Counterfeit Lesbian (1963) by Stanley Curson (pseudonym of Samuel Merwin Jr.)

Authors of lesbian paperbacks were both male and female, and often used pseudonyms – the male authors frequently used female names. One retrospective summed up the genre as, "The vast majority of these lesbian novels were written by men, designed to fulfill straight men's fantasies...But perhaps 40 or 50 lesbian (pulp) novels were written by women, and were also good enough to becoming underground classics...The pulps also reached isolated, small-town lesbians who could read them and see that they were not the only lesbians in the world."

=== Ann Bannon ===
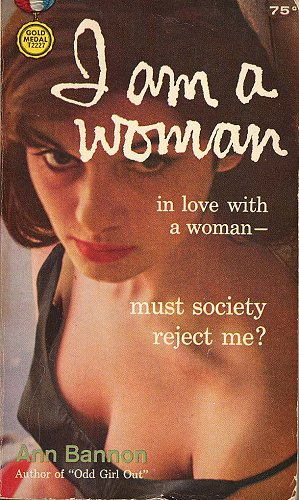
Cover of I Am a Woman (1959) by Ann Bannon

Ann Bannon (Ann Weldy) (b. 1932) wrote five lesbian-themed pulp novels from 1957 to 1962 that later became known as The Beebo Brinker Chronicles. The popularity of the books as well as the continuity of characters gave them a remarkable longevity and earned her the title, "Queen of Lesbian Pulp Fiction." Her books were re-released in 1983 and again in 2001.

Bannon wrote: Odd Girl Out, 1957 Gold Medal Books; I Am a Woman, 1959 Gold Medal Books; Women in the Shadows, 1959 Gold Medal Books; Journey to a Woman, 1960 Gold Medal Books; Beebo Brinker, 1962 Gold Medal Books. Bannon's only other novel, The Marriage (1960, Gold Medal Books), falls outside the Beebo Brinker series and is not primarily about homosexuality.

=== Valerie Taylor ===
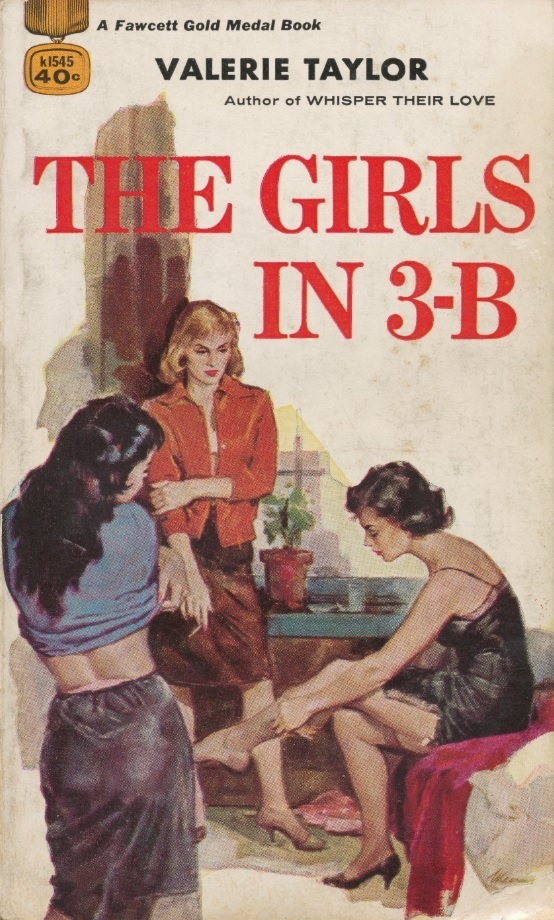
Cover of The Girls in 3-B (1959) by Valerie Taylor (illustration by James Meese)

Valerie Taylor (Velma Nacella Young) (b. 1913) wrote seven lesbian themed novels from 1957–1964, poetry that was published in The Ladder, and several novels in the 1970s through Naiad Press. She became a gay activist, co-founding the Mattachine Society and the Lesbian Writers' Conference in Chicago in 1974.

Taylor wrote: Whisper Their Love, 1957 Gold Medal Books; The Girls in 3-B, 1959 Gold Medal Books; Stranger on Lesbos, 1960 Gold Medal Books; A World Without Men, 1963 Midwood-Tower; Return to Lesbos, 1963 Midwood-Tower; Unlike Others, 1963 Midwood-Tower; Journey to Fulfillment, 1964 Midwood-Tower.

According to scholar Lisa Walker, "she is best remembered as one of a few authors of pro-lesbian pulp fiction from the 1950s and 1960s."

=== Marijane Meaker ===
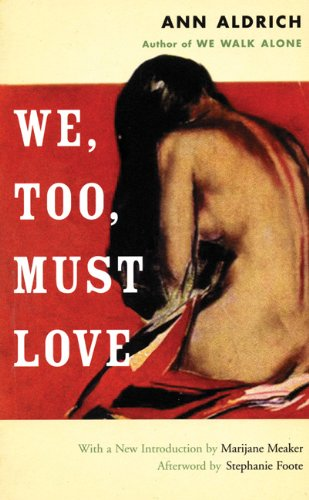
Cover of We, Too, Must Love (1958) by Ann Aldrich (a.k.a. Marijane Meaker) (illustration by John Floherty)

Marijane Meaker (b. 1927) wrote under the pen names of Vin Packer and Ann Aldrich, as well as serving as a copy-editor for Gold Medal Books. Packer's books were generally mystery novels, but using her Ann Aldrich name she wrote nonfiction books about lesbians that were not overly sympathetic about lesbianism and earned Meaker the ire of the Daughters of Bilitis printed in The Ladder. Barbara Grier once referred to her as "the evil genius." Meaker later wrote books for young adults under the names M. E. Kerr and Mary James.

Meaker wrote: Spring Fire, 1952 Gold Medal Books; We Walk Alone, 1955 Gold Medal Books; We, Too, Must Love, 1958 Gold Medal Books; Carol in a Thousand Cities, 1960 Gold Medal Books; We Two Won't Last, 1963 Gold Medal Books; Take a Lesbian to Lunch, 1972.

=== Marion Zimmer Bradley ===
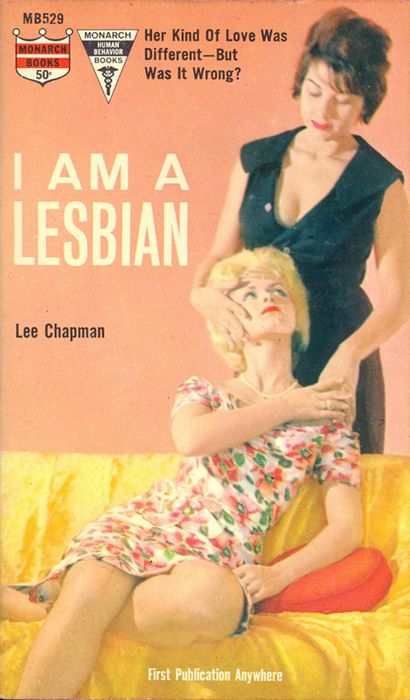
Cover of I Am a Lesbian (1962) by Lee Chapman (a.k.a. Marion Zimmer Bradley) Monarch Books

Marion Zimmer Bradley (b. 1930) wrote under various pen names, eventually becoming quite popular for her Avalon and Darkover series. For years Bradley refused to admit she authored her early paperback lesbian fiction, and was reluctant to publicly speak about her work on The Ladder.

Bradley wrote: I Am a Lesbian, 1962 as Lee Chapman; No Adam for Eve, 1966 as John Dexter; My Sister, My Love, 1963 as Miriam Gardner; Twilight Lovers, 1964 as Miriam Gardner; The Strange Women, 1967 as Miriam Gardner; Spare Her Heaven, 1963 as Morgan Ives; Anything Goes, 1964 as Morgan Ives (Australian reprint of Spare); Knives of Desire, 1966 as Morgan Ives.

=== Artemis Smith ===
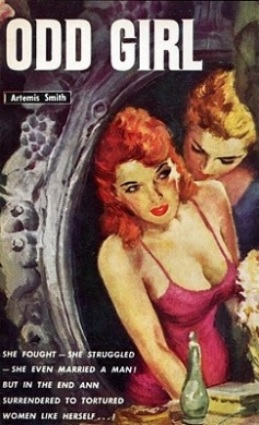
Cover of Odd Girl (1959) by Artemis Smith (a.k.a. Annselm Morpurgo)

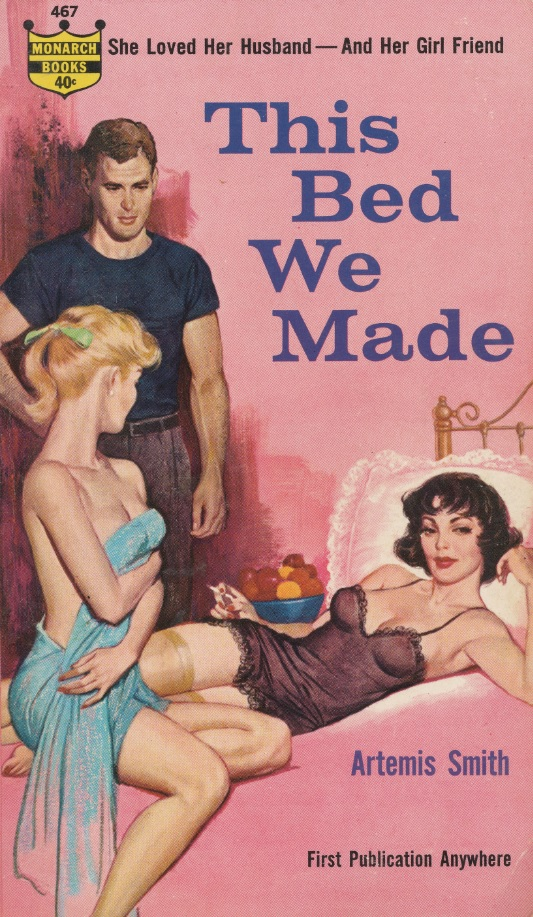
Cover of This Bed We Made (1961) by Artemis Smith (a.k.a. Annselm Morpurgo) (illustration by Rafael DeSoto)

Artemis Smith (Annselm L.N.V. Morpurgo) (b. 1934). Smith wrote: The Third Sex, 1959 Beacon Books; Odd Girl, 1959 Beacon Books; This Bed We Made, 1961 Monarch Books.

== Pro-lesbian pulp fiction ==
Literary scholar Yvonne Keller recognizes a small group of writers whose work formed the subgenre of "pro-lesbian" pulp fiction, including Bannon, Meaker, Smith, Taylor, as well as Sloane Britain, Paula Christian, Joan Ellis, March Hastings, Marjorie Lee, Della Martin, Rea Michaels, Randy Salem, and Shirley Verel. According to Keller the subgenre includes approximately 100 novels whose authors, often lesbians themselves, refused to acknowledge the conventional voyeurism of the rest of the genre.

The novels that came out during the 1950s and 60's assisted in giving representation to young lesbian women. Although these novels provided representation they were shaped by the cultural mindset of the time. Despite the homophobic undertones of some of the novels, many were still considered pro-lesbian, Women’s Barracks being a noted title.

== Cover art ==
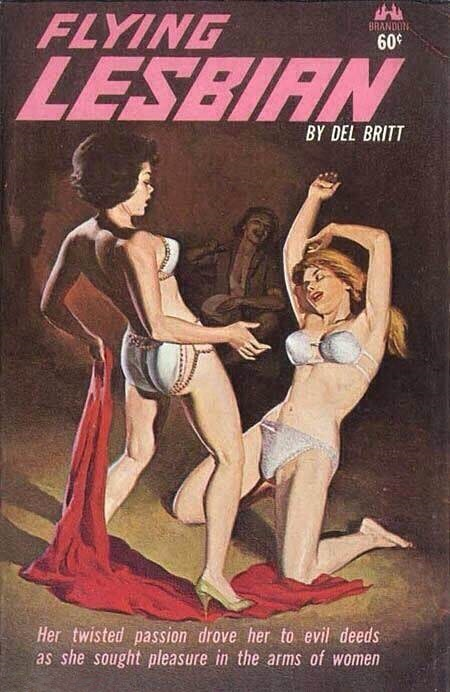
Cover of Flying Lesbian (1963) by Del Britt (illustration by Fred Fixler)

Lesbian pulp novels typically had lurid, titillating cover art. Because lesbian pulps were not typically bought by libraries, cover art played a big factor in their selling. Although many women (lesbian and otherwise) bought and read these novels, book publishers marketed them to men as erotic fantasy. Covers might have a few provocative lines of text meant to draw attention to the sexy and scandalous nature of what was between the covers. Publishers inserted words such as "twilight", "odd", "strange", "shadows", and "queer" in the titles of these books. Author Ann Bannon has stated that men would read the covers literally, attracted to the art of half-dressed women in a bedroom scene, and women would read the covers iconically: two women looking at each other, or one woman standing, another on a bed, with the trigger words of "strange" or "twilight" meaning that the book had lesbian content in it.

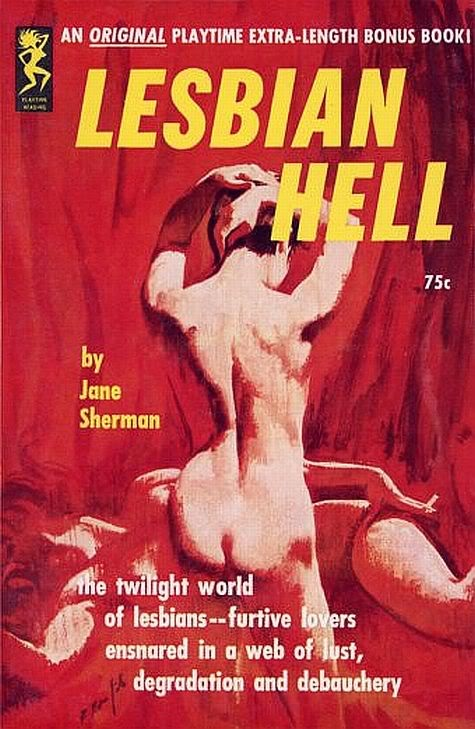
Cover of Lesbian Hell (1963) by Jane Sherman (illustration by Robert Bonfils)

Bannon was appalled by the covers that Fawcett provided for her Beebo Brinker Chronicles. Melissa Sky argues that there was a definitive type for these covers that often displayed illustrations that did not correspond to the material inside. Additionally, the covers of lesbian pulp novels often presented lesbian relationships as dangerous and questioned whether lesbians could really be seen as women, exposing deeper anxieties about the stability of the gender and sexual norms of the 1950s.

Furthermore, the covers often included blurbs on both the front and the back that emphasized the message of the illustration. These blurbs would praise the authors for their bravery in addressing their subject with honesty. They also portrayed the content of the novels as scandalous and sensational, and made it clear that the reader would find sex scenes inside. Additionally, some blurbs were written by doctors, who would recommend the books on the basis of their value as case studies, suggesting that people would read the novels for their educational value and demonstrating the way in which lesbianism was pathologized at the time.

== Decline and republishing ==
In 1964, Desert of the Heart by Jane Rule (loosely adapted as the 1985 film Desert Hearts) and Mrs. Stevens Hears the Mermaids Singing by May Sarton in 1965 were published by mainstream publishers in hardback, both enjoying a fairly successful run. Patience and Sarah (originally self-published by author Alma Routsong in 1969) is considered the first novel to initiate a feminist publishing run. In 1973, Naiad Press was founded by Barbara Grier which concentrated mainly on lesbian-themed books. The growth of the pornographic industry after a series of United States Supreme Court decisions disallowing the censorship of pornographic material, was evident in books that served to be more graphic in nature than focusing on the relationships of the women in the stories, which also led to the decline of lesbian pulp fiction. Authors March Hastings and Paula Christian both stated their publishers lost interest in their subject in the mid-1960s. As well, common plot points in the books involved women who were coming to terms with realizing their attraction to women in a world that did not allow it. With the rise of feminism, and the gay rights movement in 1969, these plot points were decreasingly relevant.

However, certain lesbian pulp novels, including Ann Bannon's books, were reprinted in the 1980s by Naiad Press with the goal of bringing lesbian authors to light. Naiad provided new covers for the books, for example portraying silhouettes of lesbian couples on the covers of Bannon's novels. Melissa Sky argues that, due to the political motivations of Naiad Press, "the cover art betrays a feminist ambivalence towards the kinds of non-egalitarian relationships depicted in Bannon's series," specifically the butch-femme relationships that were often central to lesbian bar culture of the 1950s. In the early 2000s, the queer publisher Cleis Press again republished Bannon's novels, this time with covers in the style of 1950s pulp covers. Although the cover illustrations were taken from real pulp novels, they were not the original covers of the Beebo Brinker Chronicles. Sky argues that the Cleis versions emphasize the camp quality of lesbian pulp. In 2005, an anthology titled Lesbian Pulp Fiction was published by Katherine Forrest. Forrest's forward provides further information on the genre and history.

Patricia Highsmith's The Price of Salt was adapted into the 2015 film Carol by Phyllis Nagy and directed by Todd Haynes. Starring Cate Blanchett and Rooney Mara, it received numerous accolades, bringing a 1950s lesbian "pulp story" to a wider modern audience.

== Reemergence of lesbian pulp fiction ==
In much the same way that the publication of the pulp novels of the 1950s and 1960s was made possible by new technology, another wave of lesbian literature has appeared due to the new technologies that have been available since the 1980s. In the 1980s and 1990s, lesbian fan fiction became popular, with hundreds of authors writing stories, novels, and series and publishing them online, a practice that continues today. In the 2000s, with the increased availability of the internet and awareness of the genre, authorship grew into the tens of thousands. Many authors who had been writing since the 1980s and 1990s moved away from fan fiction and began to write original works, and small presses sprang up to publish them.

With the proliferation of offset printing and the subsequent widespread availability of print on demand technology and desktop publishing, small presses with little capital began to regularly publish lesbian voices. By the start of the 21st century, over a dozen lesbian fiction and nonfiction publishers had emerged, selling hundreds of new titles a year for the lesbian audience. The three largest publishers at the beginning of the 21st century were Bella Books, Bold Strokes Books, and Regal Crest Enterprises.

The development of electronic e-books has made it possible for out-of-print books to be made available again. Many pulp novels have been reissued in e-book form, and most print books published today are also issued as e-books.

== See also ==
- List of lesbian fiction
- Lesbian crime fiction
- Yuri
- IHLIA LGBTI Heritage (owns a large collection of 1950–1960 lesbian pulp fiction)
- Gay pulp fiction
- LGBTQ literature
