= Elaine Williams =

Author of lesbian pulp fiction (1933–1961)

- Born: Elaine Miriam Williams; November 10, 1933; New Haven, CT, US
- Died: December 19, 1961 (aged 28)
- Resting place: Hartford, CT, US
- Occupations: Writer; editor
- Spouse: 0
- Children: 0
- Writing career
- Pen name: Sloane Britain; Sloan Britton
- Genre: Lesbian pulp fiction
- Notable works: These Curious Pleasures (1961); The Delicate Vice (1963)

Elaine Williams (November 10, 1933 - December 19, 1961) was an American lesbian pulp fiction author and editor of the late 1950s and early 1960s. She wrote under a pseudonym, largely either as Sloan Britton or Sloane Britain.

== Personal life ==
Elaine Williams was born in New Haven, Connecticut, the daughter of Louis Williams and Maude Saxe Williams. Fellow pulp author Gilbert Fox said of Williams: "Her family refused to accept the fact that she was a lesbian".

== Career ==
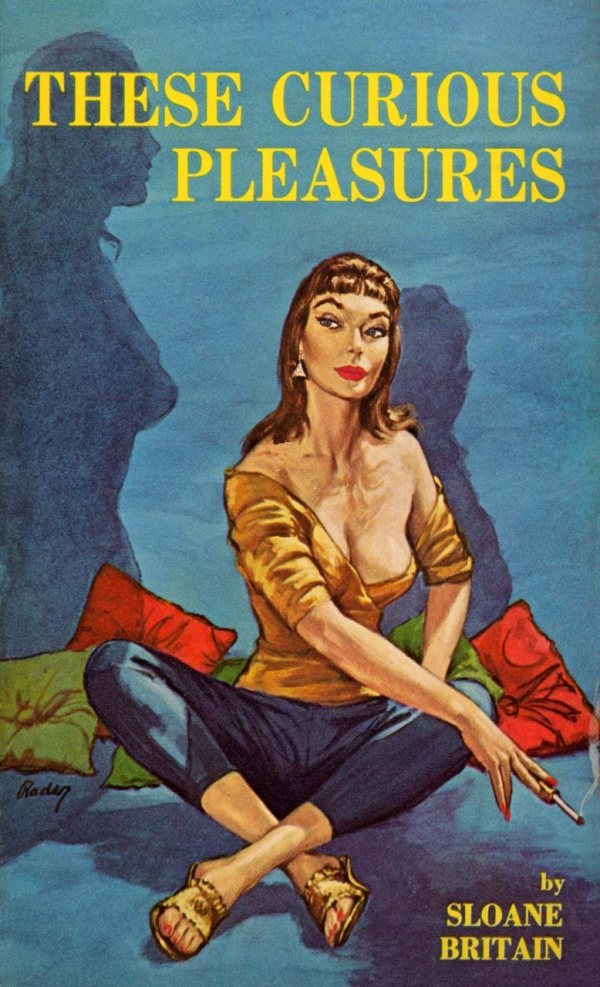
Cover of These Curious Pleasures by Sloane Britain - Illustration by Paul Rader - 1961

Williams became one of the first editors at Midwood Books in 1959. Along with editing for Midwood, Williams was asked to author her own lesbian pulp books.

At the same time, Williams began writing her own paperback lesbian pulps under a collection of pseudonyms following a similar pattern: Sloan Britain, Sloane Britain, Sloane Britton, Sloan Britton, and possibly other variations. She published her first two novels in 1959: First Person-Third Sex and The Needle. These books were published by Newsstand Library and Beacon, respectively. Both books contained lesbian or bisexual themes, thus placing Williams' work in the canon of lesbian pulp fiction of the 50s and 60s. Further, Williams' early work contained positive portrayals of lesbian relationships, making her one of the pro-lesbian pulp authors. Literary scholar Yvonne Keller named Williams as one of a small group of writers whose work formed the subgenre of "pro-lesbian" pulp fiction; others include Ann Bannon, Paula Christian, Joan Ellis, March Hastings, Marjorie Lee, Della Martin, Rea Michaels, Claire Morgan, Vin Packer, Randy Salem, Artemis Smith, Valerie Taylor, Tereska Torres, and Shirley Verel.

Her 1961 novel These Curious Pleasures revolves around a main character named Sloane Britain. It is thought that the plot is somewhat autobiographical of Williams, or at least depicts a lesbian relationship which Williams dreamed of. Also in this book is a character named Harry “Happy” Broadman, who is curiously similar to Midwood Books co-founder and publisher Harry Shorten. Both in real life and fiction, Shorten has been said to have been an unpredictable and at times aggressive man. Williams' inclusion of this character might clue readers into what it was like as one of the first editors and writers at Midwood.

Williams published eight other lesbian pulp novels in her career, plus two posthumous short novels published as Midwood Doubles. She was and still is praised for her realistic and sympathetic portrayals of lesbian and bisexual characters, but her later novels are notably more cynical, with dismal endings.

== Death ==
Williams died by her own hand on December 19, 1961. She is buried in Hartford, CT.

Other sources mention a car accident on December 23, 1963.A husband and four children are mentioned as survivors.

== Works ==
- First Person-Third Sex, 1959
- The Needle, 1959
- Meet Marilyn, 1960
- Unnatural, 1960
- Insatiable, 1960
- These Curious Pleasures, 1961
- That Other Hunger, 1961
- Strumpet's Jungle, 1962
- Woman Doctor, 1962
- Ladder of Flesh, 1962
- The Delicate Vice, 1963
- Finders Keepers, 1965
- Summer of Sin
- Peep Booth
