= Yvonne MacManus =

American novelist (1931-2002)

- Born: Yvonne Christine MacManus; March 18, 1931; Culver City, California, U.S.
- Died: March 26, 2002 (aged 71); Chattanooga, Tennessee
- Occupations: Editor; novelist; publisher
- Spouse: Arthur H. Frankel (1950-unknown)
- Partner: Jo Anne Prather
- Writing career
- Pen name: Paula Christian
- Language: English
- Period: 1959-1983
- Genres: Lesbian fiction; science fiction; nonfiction

Yvonne Christine MacManus (March 18, 1931 - March 26, 2002) was an American novelist specializing in lesbian fiction and science fiction. Although she used her real name when writing in other genres, MacManus published lesbian fiction under the pseudonym Paula Christian.

== Early life ==
MacManus was born in Culver City, California, to Daniel Salvador MacManus and Josephine Lydia Pina. Both parents were Mexican immigrants who declared their intentions to become United States citizens in 1944. Three years later, in 1947, Daniel MacManus submitted his petition for naturalization. On the following day, Josephine Pina died.

From 1935 until 1973, Daniel remained in California and worked as a Disney animator.

MacManus grew up in Glendale and attended Herbert Hoover High School. She participated in several extracurricular organizations, including the Forum Club and the Spanish Club.

In 1950, at the age of nineteen, MacManus married Arthur H. Frankel. As late as 1954, she resided in Los Angeles.

In 1955, she lived in Kew Garden Hills in Queens. During this time, she worked as a crew member for Caribbean Airways, flying out of what was then Idlewild Airport (now. John F. Kennedy International Airport).

== Literary career ==
MacManus worked as an editor for multiple paperback publishers, including Dell, Major Books, Leisure Books, and Brandon. Between 1959 and 1983, she wrote at least fourteen books spanning various genres, from lesbian fiction to science fiction to nonfiction. Her first novel, Edge of Twilight, was semi-autobiographical.

In the late 1970s, she co-founded Timely Books with Jo Anne Prather. Both women had previous editing experience in various books and magazines. Timely Books reissued MacManus' books written under the name Paula Christian and marketed them to women's bookstores. Additionally, the press published reprints of books by other female authors, such as Patte Wheat's By Sanction of the Victim.

Reviewers particularly took notice of the Paula Christian reprints. In 1981, reviewer Catherine Kemmering wrote, "There is a sameness to the writing which, while apparent after the first few chapters, does not detract from the storytelling."

MacManus gained recognition for her comical and unusual writing tips presented in her 1983 book, You Can Write A Romance...and Get It Published! In a 1983 article about romance novels, Rhoda Koenig referred to the book as "a dizzy collection of writing tips (assign astrological signs to your characters to keep their personalities focused; don't play Death and Transfiguration when you're working on a cheery scene)."

A 2003 review in Publishers Weekly described her pulp fiction as "quite modern despite their historical setting." Another review noted her "snappy, racy style and usually well-developed characters." Literary scholar Yvonne Keller included MacManus in a small group of writers whose work formed the subgenre of "pro-lesbian" pulp fiction. Other writers in this group included Ann Bannon, Sloane Britain, Joan Ellis, March Hastings, Marjorie Lee, Della Martin, Rea Michaels, Claire Morgan, Vin Packer, Randy Salem, Artemis Smith, Valerie Taylor, Tereska Torres, and Shirley Verel.

In 1978, MacManus spoke at the annual Lesbian Writer's Conference.

=== Lesbian Fiction as Paula Christian ===
- Edge of Twilight (1959)
- Another Kind of Love (1961)
- Love is Where You Find It (1961)
- This Side of Love (1963)
- Amanda (1965)
- The Other Side of Desire (1965)
- The Cruise (1982)

=== Other Works as Yvonne MacManus ===
- Love Is a Dirty Word (1965)
- The Reunion (1965)
- Better Luck Elsewhere (1967)
- With Fate Conspire (1974)
- Bequeath Them No Tumbled House (1977) - Later republished as Deadly Legacy (1981)
- The Presence (1982)
- You Can Write a Romance...and Get It Published! (1983)

== Personal life ==
MacManus expressed mixed feelings about the emerging fight for gay liberation in the early 1960s. In 1961, she submitted a short essay to The Ladder in which she wrote, "I confess I am not a dedicated lesbian. That is, one who thinks this is the only way of life, that the rest of the world can go jump in the lake; nor one who wishes to make the world safe for the next generation of homosexuals. I would prefer it if psychiatry could learn enough about the subject to help those of us who do not believe homosexuality is the best of all possible worlds."

Although preferring to maintain a private personal life, MacManus shared a public relationship with business partner Jo Anne Prather in the late 1970s.

MacManus struggled to publicly assert her identity as a lesbian because of her pseudonym. In 1975, Marie Kuda falsely identified Paula Christian as the writer Helen Baker Eastwood in her book Women Loving Women: A Select and Annotated Bibliography of Women Loving Women in Literature. Eastwood denied these claims, and as a result, rumors circulated that Christian refused to be associated with lesbians. The issue negatively affected sales for Timely Books.

In 1980, publicist for Timely Books Celeste Charles confirmed that Christian was a lesbian and asserted that she never worked in pornography as other popular rumors suggested.

Later, in 2016, Joanne Passet identified Christian as MacManus in her book Indomitable: The Life of Barbara Grier, a biography about publisher and activist Barbara Grier.

== Death ==
In 1987, MacManus lived in New Haven, Connecticut. In 2002, she died with her maiden name in Chattanooga, Tennessee.
