= Julie Ellis =

American pulp fiction and historical fiction author

- Born: Marilyn Sylvia Wasserman; February 21, 1919; Columbus, Georgia
- Died: February 15, 2006 (aged 86)
- Occupation: Actor • Author
- Writing career
- Pen name: Joan Ellis • Jill Monte • Linda Michaels • Susan Richard
- Genre: Lesbian pulp fiction • Romance Fiction
- Notable work: The Third Street (1964) • Forbidden Sex (1963) • In the Shadows (1962)
- Movement: Lesbian pulp fiction

Julie Ellis (February 21, 1919 – February 15, 2006) was an early lesbian pulp fiction author of the 1960s, writing pro-lesbian romance and erotica under varied pseudonyms for Midwood-Tower Publications. She changed her writing pseudonyms and legal name usage numerous times (Julie Marvin, Marilyn Marvin, et al.) and later in life she wrote historical and romance fiction under the name Julie Ellis.

== Early life ==
Marilyn Sylvia Wasserman was born on February 21, 1919, in Columbus, Georgia, to a Jewish couple H.B. (Herman Benjamin) Wasserman and Harriet "Hattie" Ginsberg.

In high school, Ellis became interested in acting and writing. According to some biographies, at age sixteen, she moved with her family to New York and became a member of her school's drama group, acting in school plays and writing her own plays.

She briefly studied at the University of Georgia. Then, torn between her loves for acting and writing, she began to act Off-Broadway while simultaneously writing three-act plays. One of these plays was optioned for Broadway.

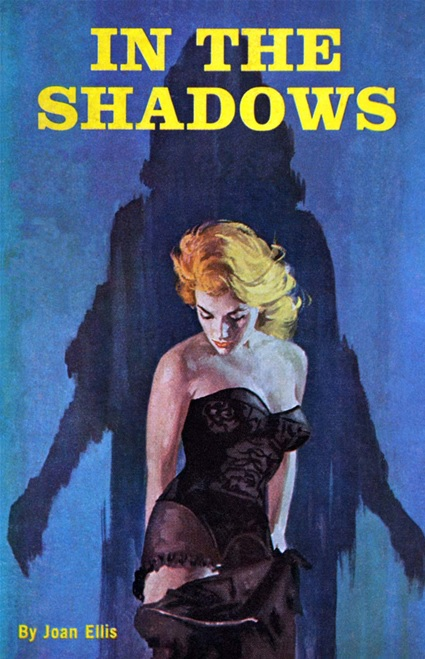
1962 cover by Robert Maguire

Ellis married her producer/director. The couple lived in East Village and had two children, Susan and Richard.

== Career ==
Ellis began her career acting Off-Broadway and selling radio and television scripts. In the late 1950s, Ellis later reported to her niece Robin Cohen that she had written and produced a play in Greenwich Village that had a sympathetic portrayal of lesbian relationships.

To support her family, Ellis turned her focus to writing. She became one of Midwood-Tower Publications early regular writers, writing pulp fiction for them in the early 1960s. Many of the books contained lesbian themes, and a handful of her titles are now considered lesbian pulp fiction classics, such as In The Shadows (1962) and The Third Street (1964). Though she did not ever publicly identify as a lesbian, she was committed to social justice. At Midwood, she supposedly insisted to her bosses that her lesbian pulp books end happily for her lesbian lovers (which is surprising since many lesbian pulps of the time ended with tragedy or death). Literary scholar Yvonne Keller named Ellis among a small group of writers whose work formed the subgenre of "pro-lesbian" pulp fiction; others include Ann Bannon, Sloane Britain, Paula Christian, March Hastings, Marjorie Lee, Claire Morgan, Vin Packer, Randy Salem, Artemis Smith, Tereska Torres, Valerie Taylor, and Shirley Verel. For her dedication to writing pro-lesbian pulps, she received many fan letters from lesbian readers.

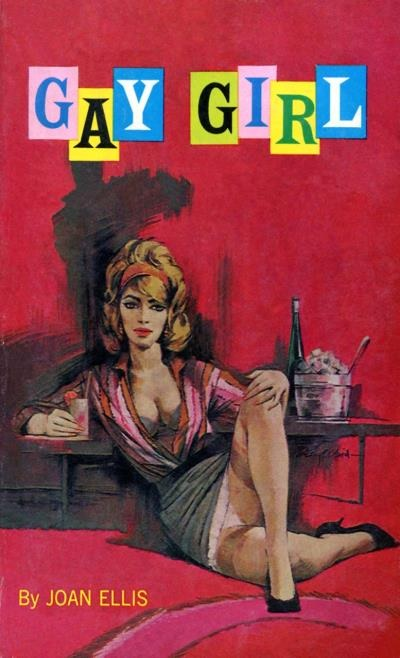
1962 cover by Jerome Podwil

A fellow Midwood-Tower Publications author and editor, Gilbert Fox, said of Ellis: "Julie was not a “dirty book writer”, didn't belong in our business, too much class. She had much greater success, all of it richly deserved, after Midwood."

Ellis wrote under a variety of pseudonyms. For Midwood-Towers, she wrote as Joan Ellis and Linda Michaels. For Beacon and Domino Books she was Jill Monte. For Paperback Library, she wrote as Susan Richard (a combination of her children's names), and for Avon, she was Susan Marino, because the publisher "wanted an Italian name". Ellis' other pseudonyms included Richard Marvin, Susan Marvin, Julie Marvin, Marilyn Marvin, Allison Lord, Ursula Grant, and Jeffrey Lord. In full, Ellis wrote some 150 books under her many pseudonyms.

Later in her life, she began to publish novels as Julie Ellis. These books were no longer in the lesbian pulp genre, but more contemporary, historical fiction, suspense, and family sagas.

In 2003, Ellis was a featured guest at the Paperback Collectors convention in New York City, along with another classic lesbian pulp fiction author, Ann Bannon.

== Personal life and death ==
Ellis had a niece, Robin Cohen, who collected lesbian pulps for thirty years before realizing that her own aunt was "the" Joan Ellis and Jill Monte. Cohen realized it through the introduction of Katherine V. Forrest's book Lesbian Pulp Fiction: The Sexually Intrepid World of Lesbian Paperback Novels 1950–1965. Ellis and Cohen celebrated the discovery and were able to meet once before Ellis' death a year later. In 2020, Robin created and posted to youtube a video memoir called My Life in the Pulps about her discoveries and contact with Ann Bannon, Valerie Taylor and finally her great-aunt Julie Ellis.

Ellis died after a stroke on February 15, 2006.

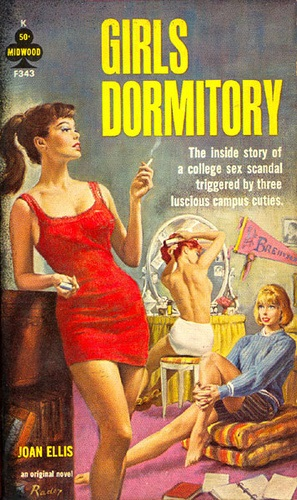
1963 cover by Paul Rader

== Selected works ==
- Numbers Girl (1961, as Linda Michaels)
- Gay Girl (1962, as Joan Ellis)
- Girls in Trouble (1962, as Linda Michaels)
- No Men Allowed (1962, as Joan Ellis)
- In The Shadows (1962, as Joan Ellis)
- Campus Kittens (1963, as Joan Ellis)
- The Strange Compulsions of Laura M. (1963, as Joan Ellis)
- Forbidden Sex (1963, as Joan Ellis)
- The Third Street (1964, as Joan Ellis)
- A World Divided (1964, as Jill Monte)
- Thrill Clinic (1966, as Jill Monte)
- Intruder at Maison Benedict (1967, as Susan Richard)
- Chateau Saxony (1971, as Susan Richard)
- Vendetta Castle (1971, as Susan Marino)
