= American literary regionalism =

Style or genre of writing in the United States

American literary regionalism, often used interchangeably with the term "local color", is a style or genre of writing in the United States that gained popularity in the mid-to-late 19th century and early 20th century. In this style of writing, which includes both poetry and prose, the setting is particularly important and writers often emphasize specific features, such as dialect, customs, history and landscape, of a particular region, often one that is "rural and/or provincial". Regionalism is influenced by both 19th-century realism and Romanticism, adhering to a fidelity of description in the narrative but also infusing the tale with exotic or unfamiliar customs, objects, and people.

Literary critics argue that nineteenth-century literary regionalism helped preserve American regional identities while also contributing to domestic reunification efforts after the Civil War Richard Brodhead argues in Cultures of Letters, "Regionalism's representation of vernacular cultures as enclaves of tradition insulated from larger cultural contact is palpably a fiction ... its public function was not just to mourn lost cultures but to purvey a certain story of contemporary cultures and of the relations among them".

Amy Kaplan, in contrast, debates race relations, empire, and literary regionalism in the nineteenth century, noting that "regions painted with 'local color' are traversed by the forgotten history of racial conflict with prior regional inhabitants, and are ultimately produced and engulfed by the centralized capitalist economy that generates the desire for retreat" (256). Critic Eric Sundquist ultimately suggests the social inequity inherent in the aesthetic distinction between realist and regionalist authors, noting: "Economic or political power can itself be seen to be definitive of a realist aesthetic, in that those in power (say, white urban males) have been more often judged 'realists,' while those removed from the seats of power (say, Midwesterners, blacks, immigrants, or women) have been categorized as regionalists" (503).

== Characteristics ==
Any literary movement will have its diversity, but there are certain shared characteristics that help to define a literary movement. In the case of regionalism, these characteristics include the following:

- A focus on the setting of the story, often to such a degree that it appears little else happens beyond description of the setting and people;
- Characters that are somewhat stereotypical, offering a picture of (actual or perceived) common traits from that region;
- A great deal of nostalgia and resistance to change;
- Use of local dialect, especially in the dialogue; and
- Thick description of people, places, and things that the author means to highlight.

== Regionalist writers ==
- James Lane Allen
- Sherwood Anderson
- Mary Austin
- Wendell Berry
- Alice Brown
- George Washington Cable
- Abraham Cahan
- Erskine Caldwell
- Alice Cary
- Willa Cather
- Charles W. Chesnutt
- Kate Chopin
- Irvin S. Cobb
- August Derleth
- Alice Dunbar Nelson
- Edward Eggleston
- Sui Sin Far
- William Faulkner
- Mary E. Wilkins Freeman
- Richard Ford
- Zona Gale
- Hamlin Garland
- Ellen Glasgow
- Davis Grubb
- Joel Chandler Harris
- Bret Harte
- Pauline Hopkins
- Zora Neale Hurston
- Sarah Orne Jewett
- Garrison Keillor
- Grace King
- Harper Lee
- Carson McCullers
- John Trotwood Moore
- Willie Morris
- Mary Noailles Murfree
- John Neal
- Flannery O'Connor
- Thomas Nelson Page
- Suzan-Lori Parks
- Charles Portis
- Ron Rash
- Marjorie Kinnan Rawlings
- James Whitcomb Riley
- Harriet Beecher Stowe
- Gene Stratton-Porter
- Jesse Stuart
- Ruth Suckow
- Celia Thaxter
- Maurice Thompson
- John Kennedy Toole
- Mark Twain
- Robert Penn Warren
- Sam. R. Watkins
- Manly Wade Wellman
- Eudora Welty
- Thomas Wolfe
- Constance Fenimore Woolson
- Martha Strudwick Young
- Zitkala-Sa

== See also ==
- Realia (translation)

== Bibliography ==
- "New England in the Short Story." Atlantic Monthly 67 (1891): 845–850.
- Wood, Ann D. "The Literature of Impoverishment: The Women Local Colorists in America, 1865–1914." Women's Studies: An Interdisciplinary Journal 1 (1972): 3–46.
- Donovan, Josephine (1983) New England Local Color Literature: A Women's Tradition. New York: Ungar.
- Elliott, Emory, ed. (1988). "Regionalism: A Diminished Thing". Columbia Literary History of the United States. Columbia University Press. pp. 761–784. ISBN 978-0-585-04152-0.
- Wilson, Charles Reagan; Ferris, William, eds. (1989). "Regionalism and Local Color". Encyclopedia of Southern Culture. University of North Carolina Press.
- Kaplan, Amy (1991). "Nation, Region, and Empire". In Elliott, Emory (ed.). Columbia History of the American Novel. Columbia University Press. pp. 240–266. ISBN 978-0-231-07360-8.
- Brodhead, Richard H. (1993). Cultures of Letters: Scenes of Reading and Writing in Nineteenth-Century America. University of Chicago Press. ISBN 978-0-226-07526-6.
- Nickels, Cameron C. New England Humor: From the Revolutionary War to the Civil War. 1st ed. Knoxville: University of Tennessee Press, 1993.
- Glazener, Nancy (1997). Reading for Realism: The History of a U.S. Literary Institution, 1850–1910. Duke University Press. ISBN 0-8223-1870-9. (Discusses magazines such as Atlantic Monthly, The Century, Harper's Monthly, The Nation, Scribners)
- Pryse, Marjorie. "Origins of American Literary Regionalism: Gender in Irving, Stowe, and Longstreet." In Breaking Boundaries: New Perspectives on Women's Regional Writing, edited by Sherrie A. Inness and Diana Royer, pp. 17–37. Iowa City: University of Iowa Press, 1997
- Foote, Stephanie (2001). Regional Fictions: Culture and Identity in Nineteenth-Century American Literature. University of Wisconsin Press. ISBN 978-0-299-17113-1.
- Witschi, N.S. (2002). Traces of Gold: California's Natural Resources and the Claim to Realism in Western American Literature. Tuscaloosa: University of Alabama Press. ISBN 0-8173-1117-3.
- Fetterley, Judith; Pryse, Marjorie (2003). Writing Out of Place: Regionalism, Women, and American Literary Culture. University of Illinois Press. ISBN 978-0-252-02767-3.
- Judith Fetterley; Marjorie Pryse, eds. (1992). American Women Regionalists. W.W. Norton & Company. ISBN 0-393-31363-8.
- Lutz, Tom. Cosmopolitan Vistas: American Regionalism and Literary Value. Ithaca, N.Y.: Cornell University Press, 2004. via Google Books
- Campbell, Donna M. (2006). "Regionalism and Local Color Fiction". In Tom Quirk; Scharnhorst, Gary (eds.). American History Through Literature, 1870–1920. Vol. 3. Detroit: Charles Scribner's Sons. ISBN 978-0-684-31493-8.
- Joseph, Philip (2007). American Literary Regionalism in a Global Age. Louisiana State University Press. ISBN 978-0-8071-3188-6.
