= Corps des Volontaires françaises =

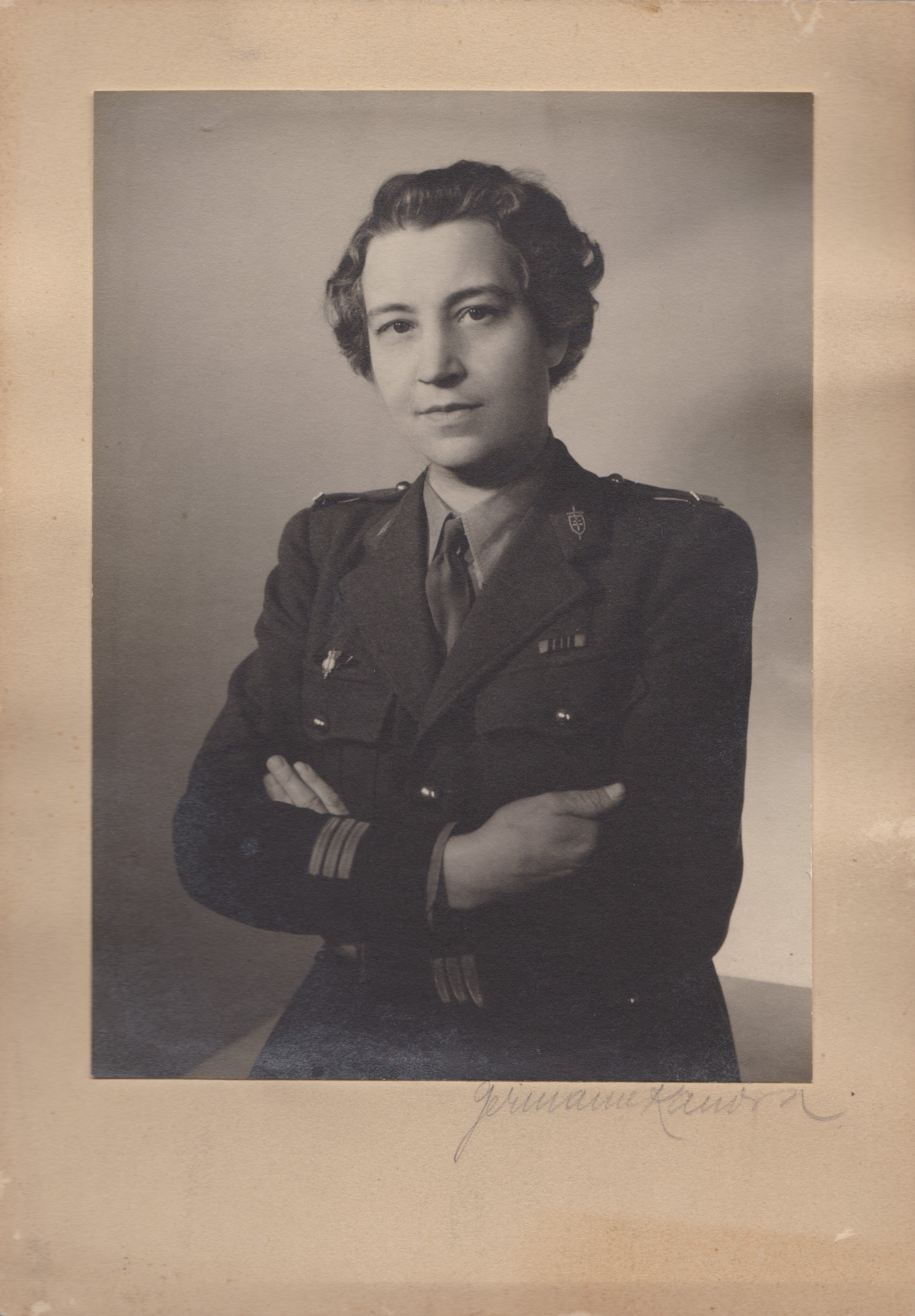
- Hélène Terré, the second commanding officer of the CVF, pictured in uniform.
- Active: 1940–1944
- Country: Free France
- Size: 430 women (1943)

Commanders
- Notable commanders: Simonne Mathieu, Hélène Terré

The Corps of French Female Volunteers (French: Corps des Volontaires françaises, or CVF) was a military auxiliary service established by the Free French forces in the United Kingdom during World War II. It was founded on 7 November 1940 as the Female Corps (French: Corps féminin, CF) and was inspired by the precedent of the Auxiliary Territorial Service (ATS) and was the first female unit in the military history of France. It was initially commanded by Simonne Mathieu and later by Hélène Terré. Initially only 26-strong, the CF was intended to provide personnel to serve in clerical and secretarial functions that would enable male personnel to be dispatched to front-line units. The CF was renamed on 16 November 1941 and formally integrated into the Free French Forces. It numbered 430 women by July 1943. It was disbanded in May 1944 at the start of the Liberation of France and was superseded by the Arme féminine the following month.

== Notable personnel ==
- Simonne Mathieu (1908–1980), tennis player and first commanding officer
- Hélène Terré (1903–1993), second commanding officer
- Tereska Torrès (1920–2012), author of the fictionalised memoir Women's Barracks (1950).
- Éliane Brault (1895–1982), politician and freemason.
