= Marijane Meaker =

American writer (1927–2022)

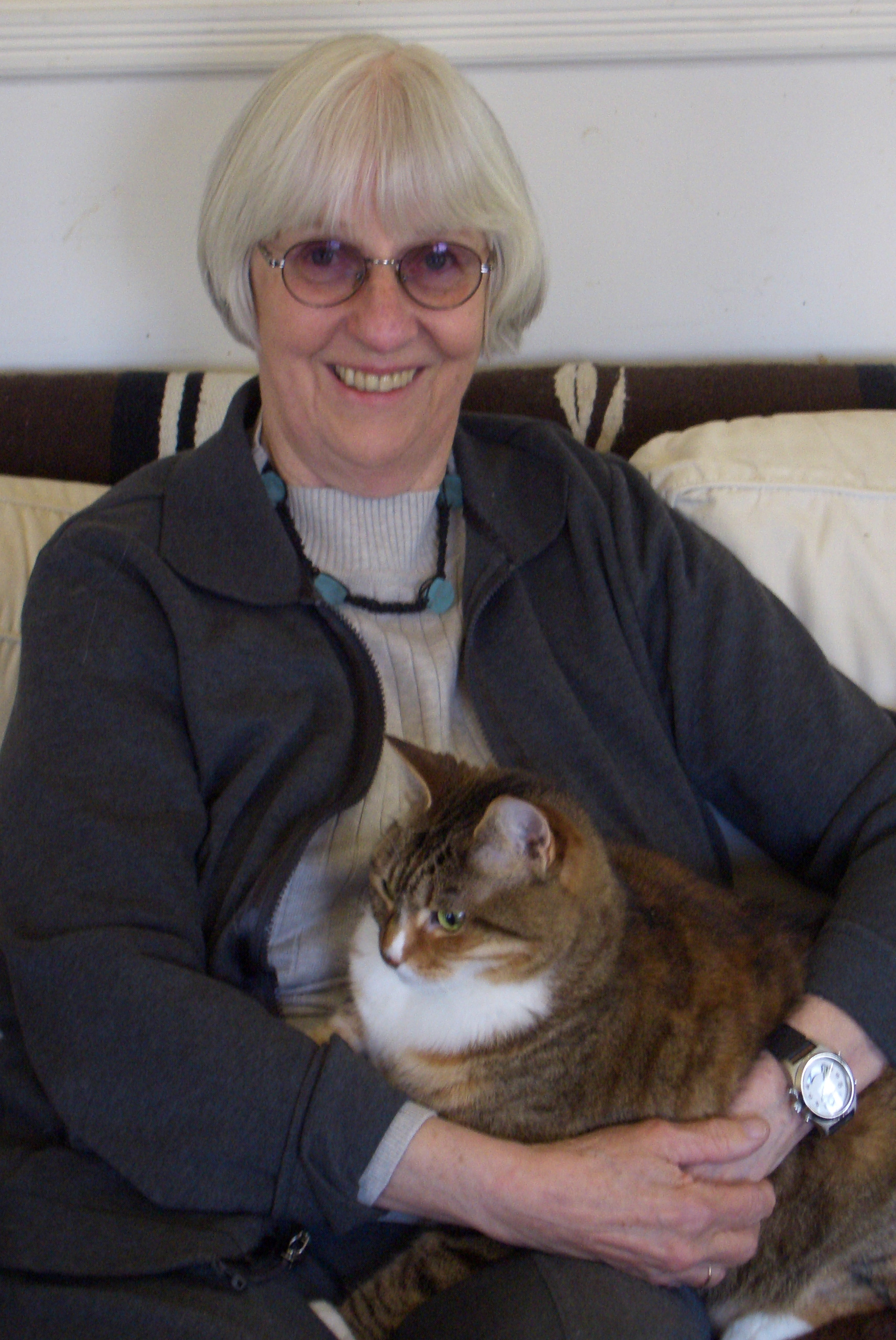
- Meaker in 2007
- Born: May 27, 1927; Auburn, New York, U.S.
- Died: November 21, 2022 (aged 95); Springs, New York, U.S.
- Occupation: Writer
- Writing career
- Pen name: Ann Aldrich; M. E. Kerr; Mary James; Vin Packer; Laura Winston
- Genres: Mystery fiction, lesbian pulp fiction, young adult fiction
- Subject: Resources for lesbians
- Notable awards: Margaret A. Edwards Award; 1993
- Website: www.mekerr.com

Marijane Agnes Meaker (May 27, 1927 – November 21, 2022) was an American writer who, along with Tereska Torres, was credited with launching the lesbian pulp fiction genre, the only accessible novels on that theme in the 1950s.

Under the name Vin Packer, she wrote mystery and crime novels, including Spring Fire. As Ann Aldrich, she wrote nonfiction books about lesbians, and as M.E. Kerr, she wrote young-adult fiction. As Mary James, she wrote books for younger children.

Meaker won multiple awards including the American Library Association's lifetime award for young-adult literature, the ALA Margaret A. Edwards Award. She was described by The New York Times Book Review as "one of the grand masters of young adult fiction."

Meaker's books feature complex characters that have difficult relationships and complicated problems, who rail against conformity. Meaker said of this approach, " I remember being depressed by all the neatly tied-up, happy-ending stories, the abundance of winners, the themes of winning, solving, finding — when around me it didn't seem that easy. So I write with a different feeling when I write for young adults. I guess I write for myself at that age."

== Early life and education ==
Meaker was born May 27, 1927, in Auburn, New York, to Ellis R. Meaker and the former Ida T. Jonick. Her father was a mayonnaise manufacturer. She spent her childhood in Auburn. She mentioned in an autobiography that Carson McCullers' book Member of the Wedding influenced her. In a 2006 interview, Meaker said of McCullers, "I was drawn to all McCullers’s books. She was an underdog-lover as I am. She was also this sensitive, intelligent writer whose words were lovely. I felt she was a champion of everyone who felt out-of-step with the world. I still feel that way." Meaker grew up in a house filled with books and was fascinated by the concept of writing and writers. She was particularly interested in the idea of a pseudonym, that one could invent a new name, and a new personality with each name.

Meaker asked her parents to send her to Stuart Hall School, a boarding school in Staunton, Virginia, when she heard that lesbian activity occurred frequently at boarding schools. Unfortunately, she was kicked out: "I was an unruly, rebellious child – a troublemaker with low marks. I was suspended in my senior year for throwing darts at a dartboard decorated with the pictures of faculty members cut out of an old yearbook. My mother's pleas to the bishop (it was an Episcopal school) got me reinstated long enough to graduate." As a high-school junior she began submitting stories to women's magazines under the name "Eric Rantham McKay" and was soundly rejected.

Meaker later attended Vermont Junior College in 1945 and the University of Missouri from 1946 to 1949, where she was a member of Alpha Delta Pi sorority. She wasn't interested in conforming to the rules of a sorority, though; she preferred to seek friends who were also writers. She made frequent submissions to literary magazines and collected many rejection slips.

Meaker sold her first story to Ladies' Home Journal under the name Laura Winston for $750.

== Writing career ==
=== Vin Packer ===
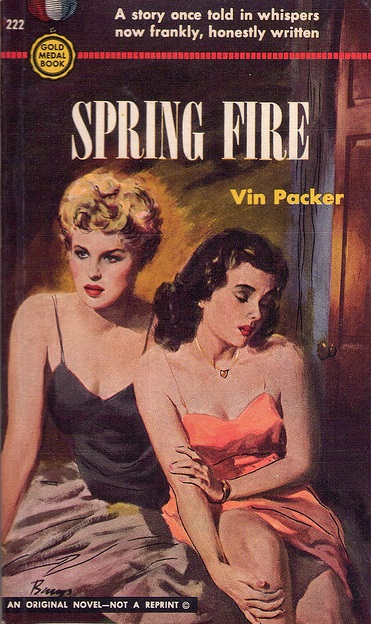
Cover of Spring Fire - Vin Packer (Marijane Meaker) 1952

Upon graduation, she worked as a file clerk with Dutton Publishing, then as a proofreader with Gold Medal Books, and began writing mostly mystery novels as Vin Packer. According to her autobiographical young adult book ME ME ME ME: Not a Novel (1984), Meaker began her professional writing career by posing as a literary agent, whose "clients" consisted of her own pen names. As Packer, Meaker wrote 20 books in all, including The Evil Friendship from 1958, an account of the Parker–Hulme murder case in New Zealand. Two books by Packer were loosely based on the Emmett Till murder and the aftermath of the investigation: 3-Day Terror and Dark Don't Catch Me. Unlike other popular crime writers in the pulp market, Packer's books were less based on action, and more "psychologically dense" and "insidious". One mystery critic said of Packer's books, "Her probing accounts of the roots of crime are richly detailed snapshots of their times, unconventional, intensely readable, and devoid of heroes, villains, or pat solutions."

As Vin Packer, Meaker wrote the groundbreaking romance novel Spring Fire, published in 1952, which along with Tereska Torres' Women's Barracks is credited with launching the genre of lesbian "pulp" fiction. Spring Fire was a response to the immense success of the 1950 Torres novel, which sold 4.5 million copies. Eager to continue their financial success, editor Dick Carroll asked Meaker to write a book with a lesbian theme. Her original story idea involved a romance between two students of a boarding school, but editor Dick Carroll asked her to change it to sorority sisters because the boarding school setting was too risky. "He said, 'Well, it has to be a sorority, because a boarding school is too young.' He added, 'Make sure that these girls turn away from homosexuality because it is immoral, don't just have them talk about it being a hard life. We have to pass postal inspection.'" Writer Ann Bannon has credited her beginnings as an author of lesbian fiction to discovering the Vin Packer novels in the 1950s. The response to Spring Fire was beyond all Meaker's and Gold Medal Books' expectations. Meaker states she got "boxes of mail" from women who were thrilled to see a book that addressed a lesbian relationship; gay audiences weren't considered a market at this time.

Paperback novels were rarely reviewed by mainstream literary reviews, but a Packer novel titled, Come Destroy Me was noticed by The New York Times crime-fiction reviewer Anthony Boucher. Meaker said, "I decided then and there that I would never write an ordinary story again; that if I was writing for paperback, I would write suspense because I wanted the reviews." Soon after editor Dick Carroll from Gold Medal Books died, Meaker stopped writing as Vin Packer.

=== Ann Aldrich ===
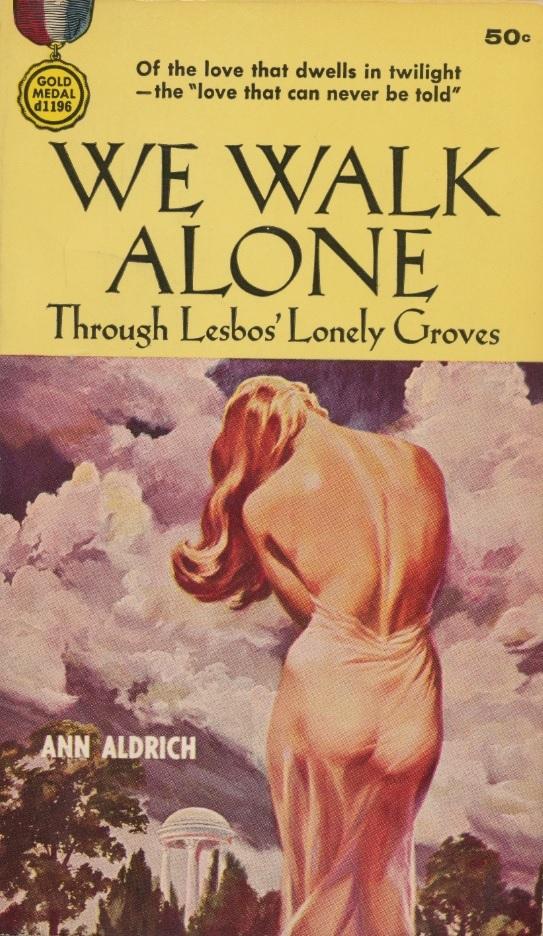
Cover of We Walk Alone

Meaker used the pseudonym Ann Aldrich for a series of five books published as paperback originals, but which were in fact nonfiction works. She read Donald Webster Cory's book The Homosexual in America, which was a nonfiction book about gay men. Noticing there was nothing similar for lesbians, Meaker used her own observations of lesbians and the lives of lesbians that included We Walk Alone in 1955, We, Too, Must Love in 1958, Carol in a Thousand Cities in 1960, We Two Won't Last in 1963, and Take A Lesbian To Lunch in 1972. The Feminist Press re-released We Walk Alone and We, Too, Must Love in 2007. Meaker said of this series, "The Aldrich books were more like resource books. A lot of the mail I got was from people wanting to know where the bars were in New York, where they could live, where I had lived. You know, they wanted to know how to get to New York and how to get to these bars."

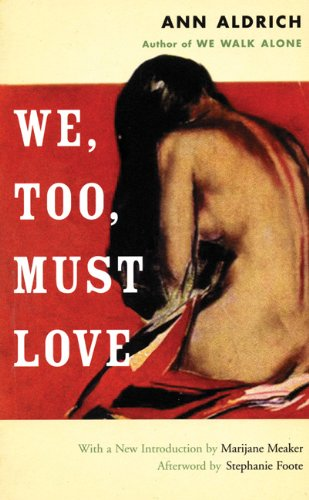
Cover of "We, Too, Must Love" by Ann Aldrich (Marijane Meaker). Illustration by John J. Floherty Jr.

In an interview with the Lambda Book Report in 2005, Meaker reflected on the impact of her books as Ann Aldrich, saying, "I honestly never thought about anything except people like me buying the book. I never thought of us having any entitlement or any importance; it just never dawned upon me. If somebody had showed me the [gay couples in the] wedding pages of The New York Times, which was awaiting us in the future, I wouldn't have believed it. I thought books were important, but these were paperbacks and so I didn't think they would last any longer than the paper that they were printed on." These books proved to be controversial when released. Books by Ann Aldrich were not overly sympathetic toward lesbians as a group, and they caused some consternation when being discussed by the Daughters of Bilitis. Ann Aldrich and the contributors to The Ladder took potshots at each other in print; once, a contributor to The Ladder accused Aldrich of being Ann Bannon, stating she expressed self-loathing in her writings. In 1970, Gene Damon of The Ladder referred to Meaker as "the evil genius" for her excellent writing about unpleasant and unsatisfactory lesbian themes.

=== M. E. Kerr ===
Meaker was persuaded to try young adult fiction at the suggestion of author Louise Fitzhugh (Harriet the Spy), and chose to do so after reading Paul Zindel's The Pigman. She chose the pen name M. E. Kerr, as a phonetic play on her last name. Although the audience was different from Vin Packer's, Kerr's approach to her stories and characters seemed to vary little. She still addressed topics not usually covered by children's books: racism, AIDS, homosexuality, absent parents, social class differences, and her characters still had problems that had no easy solutions. She said of this direction, "I tend to write about people who struggle, who try to overcome obstacles, who usually do, but sometimes not. People who have all the answers and few problems have never interested me, not to write about, not to befriend." Kerr's books addressed functions and dysfunctions in relationships between parents and children, teachers and students, friends, and she often wrote about first loves.

Kerr's first attempt was extremely successful. Dinky Hocker Shoots Smack! was published in 1972 and was about an overweight girl whose mother is so preoccupied with assisting people addicted to drugs that she virtually ignores her own daughter. It was listed by the School Library Journal's 20th century 100 most significant books for children and young adults. The story was inspired by a class Meaker taught by going into high schools and talking to students about writing. One overweight girl wrote stories Meaker characterized as "really grotesque"; when her mother, a local do-gooder, found out Meaker was encouraging her, she complained that Meaker was trying to get her daughter to "write weird." The novel would later be turned into an ABC Afterschool Special (as "Dinky Hocker)" in 1979 with Wendie Jo Sperber in the title role.

Is That You, Miss Blue?, published in 1975, involves a girl in a Virginia Episcopal boarding school who develops a crush on her religiously devout teacher. Kerr modeled the story on her own experiences in boarding school when she developed a crush on one of her own teachers.

1978's Gentlehands is about a young man who becomes involved with a young woman from a much wealthier family. When he tries to get to know his estranged grandfather, he learns that the man was a Nazi who killed Jews at Auschwitz. The premise for the book, stated Kerr, was, "I wanted to provoke the idea of what if you meet a nice guy, a really nice man, and what if you find out that in his past he wasn't such a nice man? How would you feel?"

In 1994's Deliver Us From Evie, 16-year-old Parr tells the story of his 18-year-old sister Evie's relationship with another girl and also of his own interest in a girl whose family rejects homosexuality as immoral. Kerr again addressed homosexuality in 1997's "Hello," I Lied, about a young man who finds himself pulled in multiple directions.

=== Mary James ===
In the 1990s, Meaker added the pen name Mary James for a series of novels aimed at readers younger than the Kerr readership; it was not until 1994, after the publication of the third Mary James novel, that the covers indicated that the author was also known as M. E. Kerr. Mary James books include Shoebag, The Shuteyes, Frankenlouse and Shoebag Returns.

Meaker gave advice in an interview for any aspiring writer, from her own experience: "I would tell aspiring writers to read. Read, read, read, read ... Read the kind of books you'd like to write. Study your competition, see how they do it. Go away to college, or to work or whatever. See some of the world away from where you live. Try to join or start a writers' group where everyone shares what they're working on."

== Impact and legacy ==
Meaker, along with Torres, is credited with creating the lesbian pulp fiction subgenre. She is named by literary scholar Yvonne Keller as one of a small group of writers whose work formed the subgenre of "pro-lesbian" pulp fiction; others include Ann Bannon, Sloane Britain, Paula Christian, Joan Ellis, March Hastings, Marjorie Lee, Della Martin, Rea Michaels, Claire Morgan, Randy Salem, Artemis Smith, Valerie Taylor, Torres, and Shirley Verel.

== Personal life and death ==
Meaker has admitted to dating men in her early life because she felt it was expected of her; she dealt with meeting the expectations of her family and friends despite knowing she was a lesbian "by playing the game: dating, going steady with a serviceman I really liked, but not 'that way' and in general coping as we all had to do by behaving like everyone else."

Meaker was involved romantically with author Patricia Highsmith for two years, writing about the relationship in the 2003 nonfiction memoir, Highsmith: A Romance of the 1950s, and discussed it and her own pulp fiction novels in interviews around the time of the book's release. Meaker explained that she wrote about their relationship because "I knew Pat when she was young and not yet so jaded and bigoted. The internet is filled with stories of her meanness, and prejudice, and also of her introversion, of her being a loner. I met that Pat many years after we broke up."

In 2006, Meaker was living in East Hampton, New York, where she taught writing classes at the Ashawagh Hall Writers' Workshop. Her workshop experiences led to the nonfiction instructional book, Blood on the Forehead: What I Know About Writing (1998).

Meaker died of cardiopulmonary arrest at her home in Springs, New York, on November 21, 2022, at the age of 95.

== Awards ==
The Golden Crown Literary Society awards a Trailblazer Award each year to one author for groundbreaking works in the field of lesbian literature. Meaker won the award in 2013 and joined the likes of Ann Bannon, Sarah Aldridge, Jane Rule, Ellen Hart, and many others as guiding lights of lesbian literature.

The ALA Margaret A. Edwards Award recognizes one writer and a particular body of work for "significant and lasting contribution to young adult literature". Meaker won the annual award in 1993 as M.E. Kerr, citing four books published from 1972 to 1986: Dinky Hocker Shoots Smack! (Kerr's debut novel), Gentlehands, Me Me Me Me Me: Not a Novel, and Night Kites(‡). The young-adult librarians called her "a pioneer in realistic fiction for teenagers. Her characters and plots often deal with ordinary teenagers who, faced with extraordinary situations and events, must make tough choices."

Meaker received other lifetime achievement awards from Publishing Triangle in 1998 (Bill Whitehead Award), the New York State Library Association in 1999 (Knickerbocker Award) and the Assembly on Literature in 2000 (Adolescents Award).

Dinky Hocker Shoots Smack! (1972) ‡

- Selected one of the School Library Journal 20th-century 100 most significant books for children and young adults
- Maxi Award, Media and Methods magazine, 1974
- Best of the Best Books (Young Adult) 1970–1983, American Library Association
- Best Children's Books of 1972, School Library Journal
- ALA Notable Children's Books of 1972

If I Love You, Am I Trapped Forever?

- Children's Spring Book Festival honor book
- Washington Post Book World
- Children's Book of the Year designation, Child Study Association, 1973

Gentlehands (1978) ‡

- Christopher Award, 1978
- Book of the Year Award, School Library Journal, 1978
- Named one of the Best Books for the Teen Age, New York Public Library, 1980 and 1981

Little Little

- Golden Kite Award, Society of Children's Book Writers, 1981

Me Me Me Me Me: Not a Novel (1983) ‡

Him She Loves?

- Emphasis on Reading Award, 1985

Fell Back

- Edgar Allan Poe Award finalist, 1990

Night Kites (1986) ‡

- California Young Reader Medal, 1992

Deliver Us from Evie

- National Council of Teachers of English Best Young Adult Novels of the '90s pick
- Best Book Honor award, Michigan Library Association, 1994
- Horn Book Fanfare Honor book, 1995

Slap Your Sides

- New York Public Library Books for the Teen Age listee, 2002
- Oklahoma Library Association Young Adult Book Award nominee

== Published works ==
=== As Vin Packer ===
- Dark Intruder 1952
- Spring Fire 1952
- Look Back to Love 1953
- Come Destroy Me 1954
- Whisper His Sin 1954
- The Thrill Kids 1955
- The Young and Violent 1956
- Dark Don't Catch Me 1956
- 3 Day Terror 1957
- The Evil Friendship 1958
- 5:45 to Surburbia 1958
- The Twisted Ones 1959
- The Girl on the Best Seller List 1960
- The Damnation of Adam Blessing 1961
- Something in the Shadows 1961
- Intimate Victims 1962
- Alone at Night 1963
- Sudden Endings 1964
- The Hare in March 1967
- Don't Rely on Gemini 1969

=== As Ann Aldrich ===
- We Walk Alone 1955
- We, Too, Must Love 1958
- Carol in a Thousand Cities 1960
- We Two Won't Last 1963
- Take A Lesbian To Lunch 1972

=== As M. J. Meaker ===
- Sudden Endings, 13 Profiles in Depth of Famous Suicides 1964
- Hometown 1967
- A Guide to the Hangover

=== As Marijane Meaker ===
- Game of Survival 1968
- Shockproof Sydney Skate 1972 (reissued 2003)
- Highsmith: A Romance of the 1950s (Cleis Press 2003)
- Scott Free 2007

=== As M.E. Kerr ===
- Dinky Hocker Shoots Smack! 1972 ‡
- If I Love You, Am I Trapped Forever? 1973
- The Son of Someone Famous 1974
- Is That You, Miss Blue? 1975
- Love Is A Missing Person 1975
- I'll Love You When You're More Like Me 1977
- Gentlehands 1978 ‡
- Little Little 1981
- What I Really Think of You 1982
- Me Me Me Me Me: Not a Novel 1983 ‡
- Him She Loves? 1984
- I Stay Near You 1985
- Night Kites 1986 ‡
- Fell 1987
- Fell Back 1989
- Fell Down 1991
- Linger 1993
- Deliver Us From Evie 1994
- "Hello," I Lied 1997
- Blood on the Forehead: What I Know About Writing 1998
- What Became of Her 2000
- Slap Your Sides 2001
- Snakes Don't Miss Their Mothers 2003
- Your Eyes in Stars 2006
- Someone Like Summer 2007

(‡) The young-adult librarians cited four novels when Kerr won the 1993 Edwards Award.

=== As Mary James ===
- Shoebag 1990
- The Shuteyes 1993
- Frankenlouse 1994
- Shoebag Returns 1996

=== Short stories ===
- "Devotedly, Patrick Henry Casebolt" 1951 as Laura Winston in Ladies' Home Journal
- "Hot Snow" by Vin Packer in the January 1956 issue of Justice Magazine
- "Only the Guilty Run" by Vin Packer in Some Things Weird and Wicked, edited by Joan Kahn and published by Pantheon in 1976
- "Jimmy from Another World" by Vin Packer in Cosmopolitan's Winds of Love, published by Cosmopolitan Books in 1975
- "Do You Want My Opinion?" 1984 in Sixteen: Short Stories by Outstanding Writers for Young Adults
- "The Sweet Perfume of Good-bye" 1988 in Visions: Nineteen Short Stories by Outstanding Writers for Young Adults
- "Sunny Days and Sunny Nights" 1989 in Connections: Short Stories by Outstanding Writers for Young Adults
- "Son of One Eye" 1989 in Scope
- "The Author" 1992 in Funny You Should Ask: The Delacorte Book of Original Humorous Short Stories
- "We Might as Well All Be Strangers" 1994 in Am I Blue? Coming Out from the Silence
- "The Green Killer" 1995 in Bad Behavior
- "Like Father, Like Son" 1995 in Scope
- Foreword 1997 in Hearing Us Out : Voices from the Gay and Lesbian Community by Roger Sutton
- "I Will Not Think of Maine" 1998 in Dirty Laundry: Stories About Family Secrets
- "Guess Who's Back in Town, Dear?" 1999 in Stay True : Short Stories for Strong Girls
- "Grace" 2000 in I Believe in Water: Twelve Brushes With Religion
- Contributor to 33 Things Every Girl Should Know : Stories, Songs, Poems and Smart Talk by 33 Extraordinary Women
- "Great Expectations" 2001 in On the Fringe
- "Hearing Flower" 2004 in Face Relations: Eleven Stories about Seeing Beyond Color
