= Hélène Terré =

French Resistance fighter

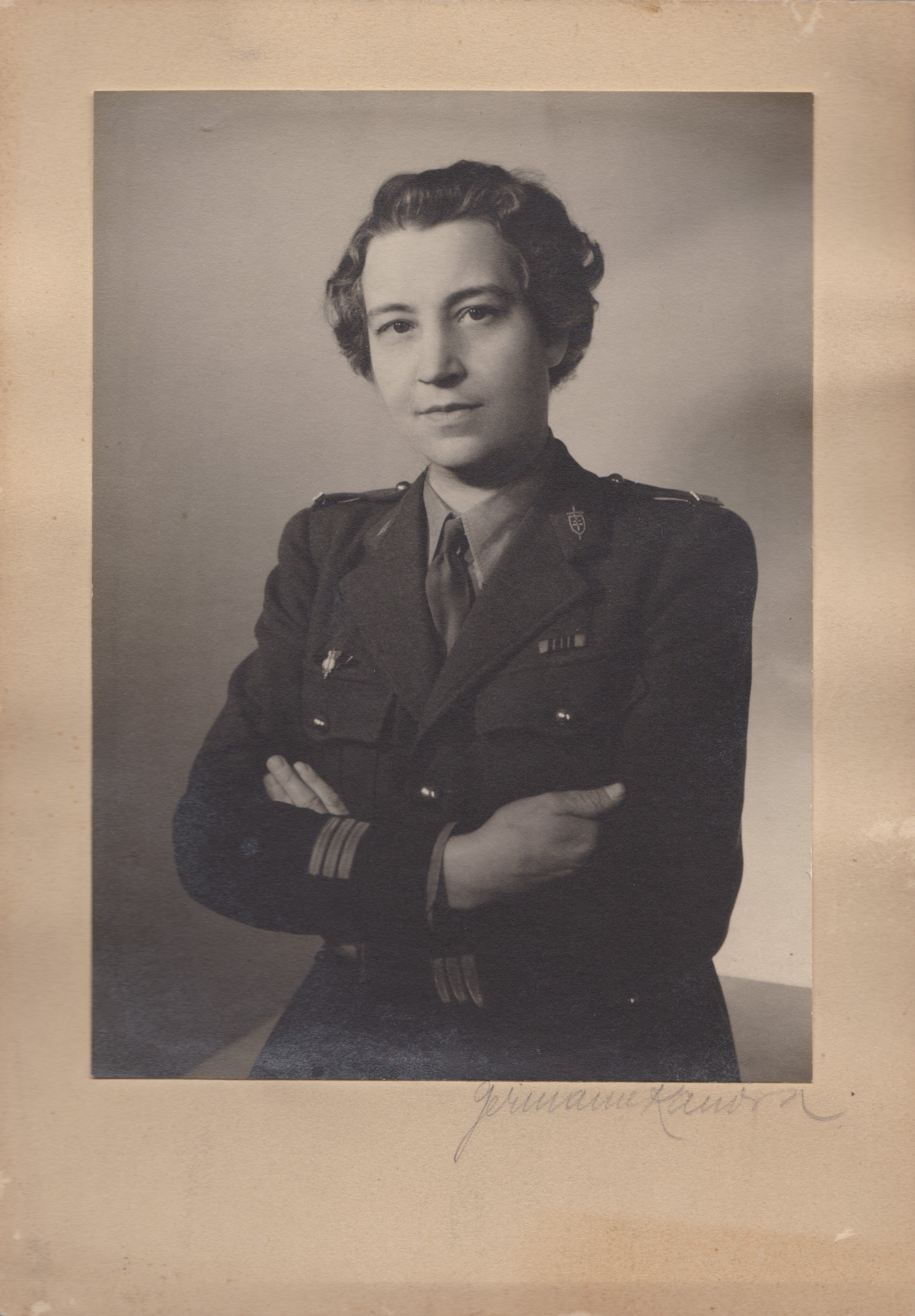
- Born: Hélène Marguerite Marie Terré; 26 April 1903; Paris, France
- Died: 11 November 1993 (aged 90); Paris
- Occupations: French resistance fighter, civilian editor
- Parent(s): Laurent Terré, Jeanne Marguerite Delasalle

Hélène Marguerite Marie Terré (1903 - 1993) was a French Resistance fighter engaged in the Free French Forces during World War II. She served in London with the French Volunteer Corps and assumed corps command from Captain Simonne Mathieu. In April 1944, she took command in France of the Army's Female Auxiliaries.

== Early life and education ==
Hélène Marguerite Marie Geneviève Terré was born on 26 April 1903 in Paris, the fourth and last daughter of Jeanne Marguerite Delasalle and Laurent Terré, an army commander. She was the great-granddaughter of Hilaire Laurent Terré.

Before the outbreak of World War II in France, Terré had developed a love for literature and fine books. To ensure her economic independence, Hélène created a publishing company, called "Ariel," where she worked for seven years. She produced an edition of Paul Valéry's complete works for the Nouvelle Revue Française, a collaboration which enabled her to work closely with the Nobel Prize nominated author. During this period, she was able to practice her artistic talents of painting and playing the violin.

== Military service ==
Terré joined the Red Cross in France, and in 1941, whilst on a mission to Britain to collect medicines and vitamins for French children, she was arrested and imprisoned for three months on the instructions of Jacques Meffre. Meffre was head of General de Gaulle's internal security service, responsible for detecting potential infiltrators amongst volunteers to join the Free French Forces. Despite this episode, she later joined the French Volunteer Corps.

The Corps des Volontaires françaises (Corps of French Volunteers) (CVF) was created in London on 7 November 1940, inspired by the British Auxiliary Territorial Service (ATS) open to French citizens 18-43. The organisation was initially led by Capt. Simonne Mathieu, a French 1930s international tennis champion. As soon as news of the formation of a volunteer corps was made public, many Frenchwomen living in Britain volunteered to join, and the first contingent was soon sent for training.

In 1941, Terré joined the CVF. By doing so, she pledged to follow the armies of Combat France in every respect, on all fronts, and for the duration of the war plus three months. As a uniformed recruit, she passed the required physical training (including drills and military discipline). Some volunteers were selected for special training according to their skills and inclinations, such as office and secretarial workers, nurses, translators, interpreters, telephone operators, cooks, motor drivers, mechanics and more. There were instructional courses for those wishing to improve their English language skills. The women were usually assigned positions where they replaced men who could then be sent to serve in combat units.

The volunteers' work in Britain included a range of duties, as Terré wrote. "The young French speakers who were fluent in the English language were used as “messengers", others were sent to colleges in the major cities of the country to give lectures on Free France and on the living conditions in occupied territories. The nurses were immediately assigned as the need for their skills was great.

Terré later recalled that recruits included some English women. "English friends, we even had them in our unit: young girls who had been brought up in France, daughters of French mothers who received permission from the War Office to join us. I remember one of them to whom Junior Commander Cook asked why she was so keen to serve with the French women and the proud answer she received: 'Madame, I lived in France at the time of its splendor, ... don't you understand that I want to serve her in her distress.'"

Captain Terré took over command of the Corps from Captain Simonne Mathieu. General Charles de Gaulle, commander of the Free French Forces, presented the French Volunteers pennant to Terré in London, on 12 November 1942. In April 1944 she became commander of the Female Auxiliaries of the Army in France.

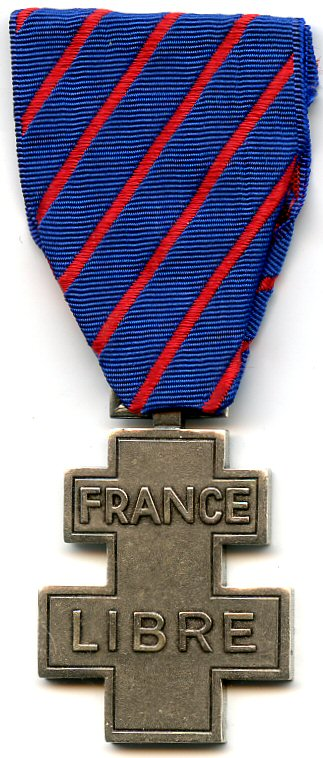
Commemorative Medal for Voluntary Services in Free France

== Post-war years ==
Commander Terré completed her Army duties in 1947 after finishing assignments in Indochina and Austria.

She married Louis Bourdet who had also served in the Free French Forces and they had two children.

She coordinated exchanges between American and French educational institutions and spoke at conferences in American universities. She retired to her family's ancestral region in Plancher-Bas (Haute-Saône), in Eastern France, and became known colloquially as "Linette."

In 1990, Terré entered a Paris retirement facility where she died on 11 November 1993 at the age of 90. She was commemorated at a memorial ceremony on 21 January 1994, held at the prestigious Hôtel des Invalides in Paris, which is dedicated to the military history of France. The ceremony was attended by many alumni from Free France.

== Decorations ==
Commander Terré was awarded several medals for her service.

- Knight of the Legion of Honor
- Commemorative Medal for Voluntary Services in Free France
- Resistance Medal
- Croix de Guerre 1939–1945
- Officer Legion of Merit (USA)

== Publications ==
Terré wrote about her wartime experiences in several books and articles.

=== Published books ===
- Coucou La Goutte Plays her Part in the War. A tale for children, bilingual edition (English and French), 55 p. (25 illustrations by the author), London, Chatto & Windus, 1942
- Volunteers for France, Ministry of War, 16 p. (83 illustrations), January 1946
- Teaching in the United States, no 18, National Institute of Education, National Press, 131 p.1963

=== Published articles ===
- "I am still frightened of keys" (under the pseudonym of Geneviève de la Salle and in English), in Allan A. Michie and Walter Graebner (dir.), Lights of Freedom - The War in the 1st Person, ed. George Allen & Unwin (with Life Magazine ), November 1941, p.75-90
- "The female volunteers. French forces fighting " Journal of Waterloo (district of Bedford, Quebec), 16/04/1943 ( 62nd year, no 13); a digital version is available here.
- "Friends of war," Review of Free France, no 64, January 1954(available on france-libre.net [ archive ] )
- "The French volunteers in London," Review of Free France, no 187, August and September–October 1970, p.31-32 (available on the website france-libre.net)

=== Unpublished works ===
- "Haltes" (journal, 1920–1938), 74 p., Coll. go.
- "We will enter the career ... A history of AFAT", 129 p., Undated, National Archives, 72AJ238 / III; the National Archives Portal has put online a digital version of the manuscript (https://francearchives.fr/fr/facomponent/def6e4effdafd8437a3249bfbe7666c9520149d2)
- "Souvenirs ...", 29 p., Nd, coll. go.
