= Stephanie Foote =

Jackson and Nichols Professor of English at West Virginia University

Stephanie Foote is the Jackson and Nichols Professor of English at the University of Vermont. A noted scholar of American literature specializing in environmental humanities of the 19th and 20th centuries, Foote was previously Professor of English, Gender and Women's Studies, and Critical Theory at University of Illinois at Urbana-Champaign, where she had taught since 1994. Foote is the cofounder and editor of Resilience: A Journal of the Environmental Humanities.

Foote is the author of numerous books including The Parvenu's Plot: Gender, Class, and Culture in The Age of Realism, and Regional Fictions: Culture and Identity in Nineteenth-Century American Literature. She has edited Histories of the Dustheap: Waste, Material Cultures, Social Justice and republished two non-fiction books (with new forewords) written by Ann Aldrich in the 1950s on lesbian life in New York City.

Foote received her BA from Oberlin College and her PhD from University of Buffalo. Foote was a fellow at the National Humanities Center from 2017 to 18, and is working on a book on the relationship between garbage and narrative, The Art of Waste. In May 2018 she was named a winner of the Andrew Carnegie Fellowship
