= Sally Singer =

American writer (born 1930)

- Born: Sally M. Singer; December 23, 1930 (age 95); New York City, U.S.
- Occupation: Author
- Partner: InaJane Rossman
- Writing career
- Pen name: March Hastings • Laura DuChamp
- Genre: Lesbian pulp fiction

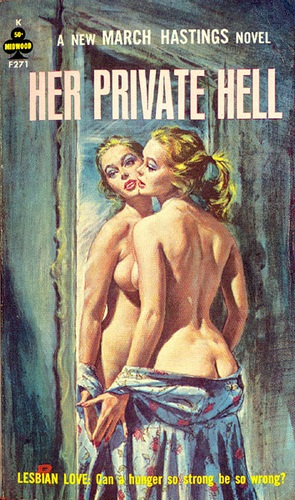
Cover of "Her Private Hell" by March Hastings (Sally Singer) 1963

Sally M. Singer (born December 23, 1930) is an American writer who penned lesbian pulp fiction from the late 1950s through the mid-1970s. She is most well known for works she wrote under the pseudonyms March Hastings and Laura Duchamp, mostly for Midwood-Tower Publications. These works include Three Women (1958, as March Hastings), The Third Theme (1961, as March Hastings), and Duet (1964, as Laura Duchamp).

== Early life ==
Sally Singer was born in The Bronx, New York on December 23, 1930. Her father, Philip Singer, was a dentist whose parents immigrated from Russia to New York. Philip lived in New York his whole life. Singer's mother, Rebie Weiner, was born in Ukraine, the youngest of ten children. Sally's grandparents immigrated to New York when Rebie was still very young.

Rebie and Philip Singer had two children, Sally and her younger brother Ron Singer. The family stayed in the Bronx.

Singer's brother, Ron, would also grow up to become a pulp fiction author, writing under many pseudonyms, but largely as Greg Hamilton and Jay Warren, both of which he penned lesbian pulp fiction under. Apparently, into adulthood, Sally and Ron no longer communicated.

Sally Singer started exploring the gay scene in her teens and she was in a committed, healthy relationship with a woman by the time she was writing her first book, Three Women.

== Career ==
Singer's first book, Three Women, was published by Universal Publishing and Distributing Corporation in 1958. The book follows a lesbian relationship's slip into despair, and by the end one turns into a psychotic mess and the other finds “true love” with her old high-school boyfriend. Singer later said on the tragic ending, "I thought to myself, ‘Gee wiz! This doesn’t reflect me at all' ... but I really had no choice in the matter.” This is most likely in reference to the heavy censorship and publisher control over lesbian-themed pulps during Singer's time; on that matter, Singer wrote: "We all know the publishing climate in those days: same sex affection is out of the mainstream loop in this country, therefore, give it to us overtly for fun and games (hetero titillation) but make sure you tack on an ending of misery, punishment, sadness—that was the commercial voice, loud and distinct.”

Because of this, and probably to maintain her privacy and safety, Singer wrote under the pseudonyms Laura Duchamp and March Hastings for her lesbian pulp.

After the publication of Three Women, Singer mostly published her books with Midwood-Tower Publications.

Singer wrote under her own name as well, for her 1970 novel For Dying you Always Have Time. Other pseudonyms of Singer's included Viveca Ives, under which she penned The Fox and his Vixen (1977), and Alden Stowe, under which she wrote Heiress (1977).

In 1989, Singer republished her most popular book, Three Women, with Naiad Press. Singer made sure that this new edition included a happy ending for her characters, which Singer had always intended. ("I don't believe in sadness," said Singer). On having to originally include a tragic ending, Singer wrote: "The voice of survival said to me, ‘Give them what they ask for now. You will have your way, later.’ Personally, I was both optimistic and nervous. I had a true and beautiful readership that I cherished. I gave them my integrity in the story-middle, and the feelings there implied our secret pact that one day it would all come right—which it did.”

By the end of her writing career, Singer boasted upwards of 132 novels, written under various pseudonyms. Over a dozen of her novels, including Whip of Desire, Obsessed, Veil of Torment, Crack Up, By Flesh Alone, Savage Surrender, The Outcasts and many others have been re-published by Cutting Edge Books, an imprint of Brash Books.

== Personal life ==
Singer was one of the few lesbian pulp authors who lived openly as a lesbian for nearly her whole life. Purportedly, at one point in her life, she was romantically involved with another author of lesbian pulp books, Pat Perdue (who wrote under the pseudonym Randy Salem).

Singer sat in a restaurant across the street from the Stonewall Inn on the night of the riots in 1969.

Later in life, Singer wrote that she is appreciative of how far things have come in terms of the acceptance of homosexuality. On a trip to Montreal, she visited a lesbian bar, and was excited by the atmosphere, but was left a bit disappointed, writing: "It had the atmosphere of being in a cheery girls’ locker room. I love seeing how things progressed for girls today and that you don't have to experience the threat of being arrested or beat up. People should be free. But there isn't the same kind of intense sexual tension in lesbian bars as there was in my time."

Little information can be found about Singer in the present day, though it seems as though she is still alive. She was interviewed by Xtra in 2005, when Singer would have been 74.

== Selected works ==
=== March Hastings novels ===
- Three Women (1958)
- Obsessed (1959)
- Veil of Torment (1959)
- The Unashamed (1960)
- Fear of Incest (1960) - reissued as Design for Debauchery
- The Jealous and the Free (1961)
- The Outcasts (1961)
- The Third Theme (1961)
- By Flesh Alone (1962)
- Whip of Desire (1962)
- Savage Surrender (1962)
- The Drifter (1962)
- The Heat of Day (1963)
- Enraptured Lovers (1967)
- Twilight Sex (1968)
- Thelma Ledge (1969)

=== Laura DuChamp novels ===
- Time and Place (1963)
- Duet (1964)
- The Other Extreme (1964)
- Encore (1964)
- Goodbye, Darling (1964)
- Thank You, Call Again (1964)
- Model Mistress (1965)
- Bedtime Story (1965)
- Stud for Sale (1965)
- Room Service (1965)
- Wild and Wicked (1965)
- Kept (1967)
- Under the Skin (1967)
