= Sex Variant Women in Literature =

Study written by Jeanette Howard Foster

Sex Variant Women in Literature: A Historical and Quantitative Survey
- Title page for Sex Variant Women in Literature: A Historical and Quantitative Survey (1956)
- Author: Jeannette Howard Foster
- Language: English
- Genre: Non-fiction
- Publication date: 1956

Sex Variant Women in Literature: A Historical and Quantitative Survey is a 1956 study written by Jeannette Howard Foster chronicling approximately 2,600 years of female same-sex attraction in literature, beginning with Sappho's works in 6th century BC and ending with Patricia Highsmith's The Price of Salt in 1952.

== Publication history ==
As well as being a librarian and professor, Foster was an author and early researcher in the field of lesbian literature. As a young woman and lesbian Foster collected every example she discovered of female sex variants in literature. Foster had been the librarian at Alfred Kinsey's Institute for sex research from 1948 to 1952, enabling her to further her research. It was while working at UMKC, as a reference and interlibrary loan librarian that Foster published the book. Foster had spent over two decades researching and writing the work, the first of its kind. Foster initially used Vantage Press to self-publish the book in 1956, before it was re-issued by feminist small presses firstly in 1975 by Diana Press and again in 1985 by Naiad Press. A British edition, published by Frederick Muller Ltd, appeared in 1958.

== Critical reception and influence ==
In a 1957 review for The Ladder, Marion Zimmer Bradley said of the book: "To the collector of Lesbian literature the work is invaluable, listing as it does every major work and many minor ones." According to Catharine R. Stimpson, Foster's book is "[t]he pioneering survey of the figure of the lesbian in Western literature." Martha Vicinus said of the "pioneering work" in 2009: "It is thorough, judicious, and witty. Knowing that most plots featured 'inbred hysteria' or similar psychological problems, Foster peppered her précis with sardonic comments about how so many authors 'bow to orthodox standards by ending tragically,' sending their lesbian characters to mental institutions or untimely deaths." In her 2008 biography about Foster, Joanne Passet said the book "represented a critical step on the road to gay liberation."

Following its publication, Sex Variant Women in Literature served as the inspiration for other scholarship work about lesbian literature including Lillian Faderman's Surpassing the Love of Men.

== Awards ==
In 1974, Sex Variant Women in Literature was awarded the Stonewall Book Award.
