= Nancy Manahan =

American educator, author, editor, and activist

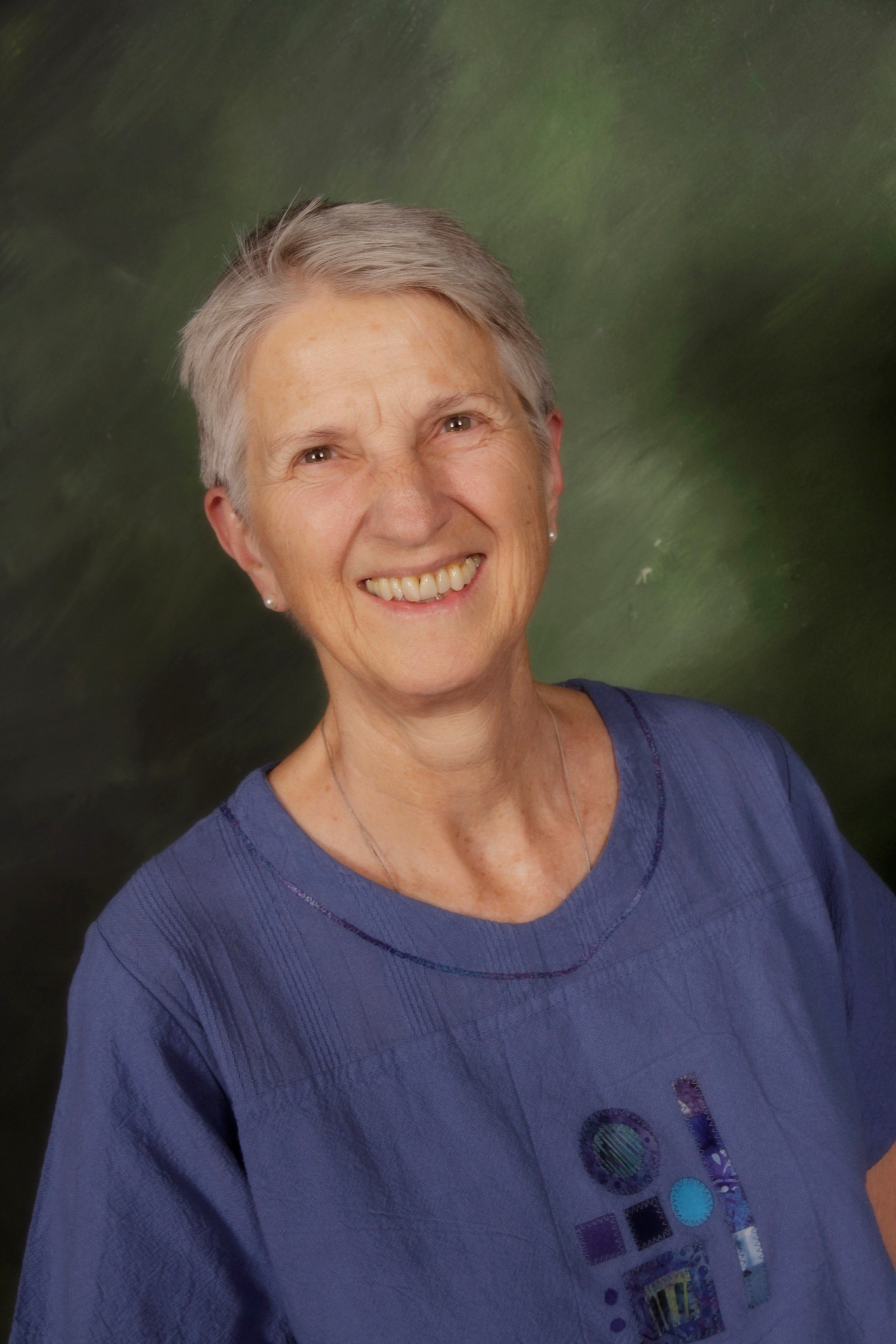
- Educator, author, editor, activist
- Born: June 8, 1946 (age 80); Madelia, Minnesota
- Education: BS, MA, PhD
- Alma mater: University of Minnesota; Illinois State University; Columbia Pacific University
- Occupations: Educator, author, editor, activist
- Known for: Lesbian Nuns: Breaking Silence
- Notable work: Lesbian Nuns: Breaking Silence
- Spouse: Becky Bohan
- Website: https://nanbec.com/

Nancy Manahan (born June 8, 1946) is an American educator, author, editor, and activist known for her contributions to lesbian feminist literature. She is best known as co-editor, with Rosemary Keefe Curb, of Lesbian Nuns: Breaking Silence (1985), an anthology documenting the experiences of lesbian women in religious life.

In addition to her work on lesbian and feminist issues, Manahan's work explores a variety of topics including literary history, education, spirituality, illness, end-of-life experience, and environmentally sustainable burial practices.

== Early life and education ==
Nancy Manahan grew up in a small farming community in Madelia, Minnesota, with two brothers and two sisters. Her father was the city attorney, and her mother was the publisher and editor of the Madelia Times-Messenger for which Nancy wrote news items as a teen. After high school, she spent two years at a Catholic women's college, majoring in nursing, then entered the Maryknoll Missionary Sisters Novitiate. At the age of 21, she left the convent to pursue further education.

In 1969, Manahan earned a degree in English from the University of Minnesota where, according to a 2018 interview with the LGBTQ Religious Archives Network, Manahan participated in anti-war demonstrations and marched for civil rights. Later, she received an MA from Illinois State University. After teaching in Napa, California, and earning a Ph.D. from Columbia Pacific University, she returned to Minnesota to teach English at Rochester Community College and Minneapolis Community and Technical College.

== Lesbian Nuns: Breaking Silence ==
=== Publication ===
In 1985, Naiad Press published Lesbian Nuns: Breaking Silence, co-edited by Manahan and Rosemary Keefe Curb. Manahan wrote in the introduction to the book that its purpose is “the breaking of the historic silence about erotic love between women in religious life.”

The book presented the memoirs of fifty-one current and former nuns. In her introduction, "What Silence Does This Book Break," Manahan shared her personal story and provided historical evidence of same-sex convent love over the centuries. The other introduction, "What is a Lesbian Nun," provides Keefe-Curb's personal story, explains how the book came about, and introduces the women in the anthology.

Controversy

Following publication, Lesbian Nuns: Breaking Silence generated substantial controversy. Some television stations that carried the syndicated show Sally Jessy Raphael barred the airing of Raphael's interview with Curb and Manahan in Baltimore, Boston, Philadelphia, Phoenix, Pittsburgh, and San Francisco.

Manahan and Curb participated in an extensive media tour that included appearances on television and radio programs in the United States, England, Ireland, Italy, France, New Zealand, Australia, and the Netherlands. Curb and Manahan were criticized by representatives of the Catholic church and received death threats when they appeared in Dublin, Ireland, on the publicity tour. Manahan and Curb made TV appearances on The Phil Donahue Show in April 1985 and again in June 1985 In 1992, the topic was again featured in the Donahue show.

When the publisher of Naiad Press sold four of the anthology stories for syndication to Forum magazine , it generated criticism and controversy within parts of the feminist and lesbian community because the magazine was seen as an exploitative journal with a largely heterosexual male audience. Later, the Advocate magazine stated that “Naiad publisher Barbara Grier justified the decision on the basis that it would help the book reach a wider audience, saying that many women, some of them closeted lesbians, read their male relatives' copies of the magazine.”

Despite that controversy and many other public arguments regarding the topic of lesbian nuns, the book sold widely, rights were sold to make a TV movie (that to date has not been produced), and in 1986, a mass market Warner Books paperback edition was published. (ISBN 9780446326599)

After a number of years of being out of print, a new 2013 edition of Lesbian Nuns: Breaking Silence was released by Naiad's successor, Bella Books, with a foreword by historian Joanne Passet, Ph.D., Professor of History, Indiana University East, and afterwords by Manahan and Keefe Curb. Passet described the book as pioneering. She wrote: “Oblivious to the controversies that surrounded the initial publication of Lesbian Nuns: Breaking Silence, whether they originated within the Catholic Church or the lesbian feminist movement, thousands of readers across the decades have embraced the book and found their lives changed by its message of empowerment.”

=== Legacy of Lesbian Nuns: Breaking Silence ===
Since 1985, subsequent works addressing lesbians in religious life have been published. One such work is Love Tenderly: Sacred Stories of Lesbian and Queer Religious (2021), edited by Grace Surdovel. In a review by journalist Claire Giangravè for RNS (Religion News Service), Giangravè notes that the Catholic sisters represented in this new collection “pushed back against the notion that just because of their sexual orientation they are not capable of living a full, chaste and faithful life.” Furthermore, a Sister of Mercy, Sr. Jeanne Christensen, wrote in her contribution about Lesbian Nuns: Breaking Silence: “There is so much anger and angst in the book, because they felt so isolated and unable really to be who they were as persons,” and adding this new book, Love Tenderly, “is an important response for that.”

According to Tracy Baim, co-founder and editor of the Windy City Times, Keefe Curb and Manahan's book is “one of the bestselling lesbian books of all time” and has been translated into multiple languages and released in published versions in Australia, Brazil, England, France, Germany, Holland, Ireland, Italy New Zealand, and Spain. At the time Keefe Curb died in 2012, Baim quoted Manahan as saying, “for the first time the word ‘lesbian’ and the concept of lesbianism was discussed openly on TV, very widely, on radio, in newspapers, in the mainstream, and the gay press, here as well as abroad, because it was published in so many countries. It really was a silence-breaking book.”

Years after its initial publication and second edition, Lesbian Nuns: Breaking Silence has continued to spark online interest, for example, "Who the F Is ... Author Nancy Manahan?" in 2014, "Women Who Paved the Way: Author Nancy Manahan" in 2017, and "What We Can Learn from Lesbian Nuns" by Carolina Flores, Ph.D., in 2026.

Other writings

=== Spirituality and illness ===
For a 2007 publication, Manahan worked with her spouse, Becky Bohan, and brother Bill Manahan to publish Living Consciously, Dying Gracefully: A Journey with Cancer and Beyond. The book was inspired by the illness and death of Manahan's sister-in-law Diane Manahan and encompassed issues of spirituality, healing, illness, caregiving, and personal transformation. It received the Midwest Independent Publishers Award for best book in Health, The Eric Hoffer Award. and a prestigious IPPY (Independent Publisher Book Awards).

=== Scouting ===
In 1997 Manahan edited On My Honor: Lesbians Reflect on Their Scouting Experience, a collection of thirty-three essays by lesbian Girl Scouts, Girl Guides, and Campfire Girls from the US and abroad. In the introduction to the anthology, journalist and Pulitzer Prize nominee, the late Victoria A. Brownworth, described the book as being “about what it means to be a girl and woman in our society, what the struggle for personal, gender and sexual identity means for women and how we empower ourselves through speaking out, through breaking silence, through understanding what honor among girls and women really should mean.”

== End-of-life and green burial advocacy ==
Nancy Manahan is a founding member of the Minnesota Threshold Network (MTN) which started in 2008 to advocate for family-directed after-death care and green burial choices. According to the MTN website, the organization promotes family-directed funerals and natural burial practices in order to create "a more natural, less commercial approach to death, including conscious dying, home vigils, family-directed funerals, and natural burials.” Manahan and her spouse have given presentations about the topic to hospices, churches, colleges, and holistic medical groups.

=== Archived materials ===
Seven boxes of Manahan's archived materials are housed at the Jean-Nicholas Tretter Collection Special Collections and Rare Books, Elmer L. Andersen Library, University of Minnesota, in Minneapolis, Minnesota. Her archival records include manuscripts, correspondence, articles, photographs, video tapes of television appearances, audio of radio interviews, personal journals, newspaper clippings, and other materials related to her life and publications, including over twenty-five issues of the Lesbian Connection periodical to which, during five decades, Manahan has contributed many articles. The collection also includes files of clippings and correspondence relating to the publication of Lesbian Nuns especially regarding the banning in Boston and the heavy criticism by the Catholic Church and the political right.

A substantial amount of archival material regarding Manahan and her work is also located in the archives of the Barbara Grier—Naiad Press Collection 1956–1999 housed at The James C. Hormel Gay and Lesbian Center at the San Francisco Public Library. Considerable space has been allocated to the extensive audio recordings made of interviews and news programs concerning Lesbian Nuns: Breaking Silence, Naiad Press, and its authors.

Additionally, the June L. Mazer Lesbian Archives in Los Angeles and the Lesbian Herstory Archives in New York City contain collections of Manahan's papers.

Manahan has spoken publicly about the need to preserve LGBTQ historical records.

=== Published long works ===
• Lesbian Nuns: Breaking Silence (1985), co-editor Rosemary Keefe Curb (new edition, Bella Books, 2013
• On My Honor: Lesbians Reflect on Their Scouting Experience (1997; reissued 2021), editor
• Living Consciously, Dying Gracefully: A Journey with Cancer and Beyond (2007), co-author with Becky Bohan
• At Sea on the Range: From Berkeley Radical to Arizona Homesteader, 1934-1948 (2024), co-editor with Natalya Lukin

=== Selected early publications ===
• “The Lesbian: A Survey” (1972) in Sexism in Education by the Emma Willard Task force on Education
• “Lesbian Books: A Long Search” in Mother Jones magazine (April 1976), republished in The Lesbian Path by Margaret Cruikshank in 1980
• “Future Old Maids and Pacifist Agitators” (1982) in Women’s Studies Quarterly, Vol 10
• “Homophobia in the Classroom” (1982) in Lesbian Studies: Present and Future by Margaret Cruikshank
• “A Lesbian Ex-Nun Meets Her Sisters” (#8, summer 1983) in Common Lives/Lesbian Lives

=== Awards and honors ===
- 2026 Alice B Readers Award for lifetime achievement in lesbian writing
- 2025 The Great Southwest Book Festival, Best Memoir, for At Sea on the Range: From Berkeley Radical to Arizona Homesteader, 1934-1948
- 2021 Lily Awards, Best Documentary, Best Trailer, and People's Choice Award for “Carefree Concert Band" and the "Carefree Concert Band trailer”
- 2008 Eric Hoffer Book Award for Living Consciously, Dying Gracefully: A Journey with Cancer and Beyond
- 2008 Independent Publisher Book Awards silver medal to Living Consciously, Dying Gracefully: A Journey with Cancer and Beyond in the category Aging/Death & Dying
- 2008 Midwest Independent Publishers Association (MIPA) 18th Annual Midwest Book Awards for Living Consciously, Dying Gracefully: A Journey with Cancer and Beyond best book in the Health category
- 2008 WOW! Women on Writing Best Book in Women's Literature for Living Consciously, Dying Gracefully: A Journey with Cancer and Beyond

== Personal life ==
Nancy Manahan and her wife, novelist Becky Bohan, have been together since 1994 and currently make their home in Florida. In addition to writing and editing books, articles, and book reviews, they produced the documentary short, “Carefree Concert Band.” According to a Women Over 70 interview by Gail Zelitsky and Catherine Marienau, Manahan continues to support and address issues in the environment, arts, education, lesbian feminist organizations, and individual feminist writers and filmmakers.
