= Torchlight to Valhalla =

- Torchlight to Valhalla; 1985 Naiad Press Cover
- Author: Gale Wilhelm
- Language: English
- Genre: lesbian fiction
- Publisher: Random House (orig); Naiad Press
- Publication date: 1938
- Publication place: United States
- Pages: 191, Random House
- ISBN: 0-930044-68-1
- OCLC: 12870253

Torchlight to Valhalla is a lesbian-themed novel published by Random House in 1938, written by Gale Wilhelm. The novel is considered a classic in lesbian fiction, being one of the few hardbound novels with lesbian content to be published in the early 20th century. Quite rare for lesbian fiction in this time, the ending is satisfactory for the lesbian characters. It was also reissued in 1953 by Lion Publishers, but titled The Strange Path. It was re-issued once more in 1985 by Naiad Press under its original title. It was Wilhelm's second novel after We Too Are Drifting, both of them containing lesbian themes. One 2002 review of the book noted that it was released "just ten years after Radclyffe Hall’s The Well of Loneliness. Wilhelm has created a work of self-exploration that bears little resemblance to the tormented world of Hall’s Stephen Gordon."

== Plot summary ==
Morgen Teutenberg is an introverted 21-year-old woman nursing her dying father Fritz, who is a painter. She is developing a novel with her father's assistance. Out walking one day, she meets a very handsome young man, Royal St. Gabriel, a pianist who is quite taken with her. Royal pursues her romantically despite Morgen's lack of enthusiasm. Fritz dies very soon after Morgen meets Royal, and she is devastated by his loss and nonplussed by Royal's attention, not seeming to welcome it, but flattered by his gentlemanly manners and thoughtfulness. He buys her a radio and has it delivered to her house with a letter telling her when to tune in to a station. When she does, she hears a composition he has written for her that she imagines describes her perfectly. For five months they have a friendship characterized by Royal's unabashed love for Morgen, and her not sure how to tell him that she is grateful for his friendship, but does not want to pursue anything deeper with him.

On Christmas Eve, overwhelmed with missing her father again, she turns to Royal and they sleep together. Royal is overcome with gratitude, not believing she has given herself to him at last, but Morgen does not enjoy the experience and realizes she went to him out of loneliness. She tells him this and he is hurt by it. He travels frequently and leaves her again, unsure of how to reach her.

In his absence, she meets new neighbors who have moved into a house nearby. A 16-year-old girl named Toni lives with her aunt. They have known each other before as children and Morgen is thrilled to have Toni back so close by. In sharp contrast to her relationship with Royal, she and Toni find themselves kindred almost immediately. They spend several nights together, and are quite hesitant to leave each other. When Royal returns, he notices something with Morgen is wrong immediately. She tells him, "I am two and the other is Toni." He is stunned, but when he accepts it, for the first time she realizes how much she likes him.

=== Explanation of the novel's title ===
Soon before Fritz dies, he comments that he will be on his way to Valhalla soon, and he is prepared for it because he is so very happy since Morgen has just finished a very good novel. He tells her that his happiness will serve as his torch in order to arrive there safely. His comment serves as the impetus for her to realize what should make her happy in her life.

== Criticism and recognition ==
Reviewers noted first Wilhelm's style of prose, which was characterized as "beautifully written", "sensitive", and "dignified," contrasting with a description of it being a "moody dose of emotionalism." All the reviewers of course noted the lesbian content (calling it "woman's love for woman") and disagreed as to whether it was handled gracefully and unsensationally, or if it indicated Wilhelm was unable to break out of a format by handling the same subject matter twice in two novels.

Said one reviewer, "Torchlight to Valhalla is not a story for sensation-mongers, nor is it for those who prefer 'morals' packaged up in simple bundles of black and white. It is, rather, a novel for readers who accept the author's quiet candor and appreciate the scrupulous artistry with which she has described a not-too-happy kind of happiness."
