= Rosemary Keefe =

American nun, professor and lesbian author (1940–2012)

- Curb (at the time), in 1985 when Lesbian Nuns was published
- Born: Rosemary Keefe; February 3, 1940; Chicago, Cook County, Illinois
- Died: May 24, 2012 (aged 72); Durham, Durham County, North Carolina
- Other name: Rosemary Keefe Curb
- Occupation: Academic

Rosemary Keefe (also known as Rosemary Curb, February 3, 1940 – May 24, 2012) was an American nun, university professor, and lesbian author. She was the co-editor of a best-selling book Lesbian Nuns Breaking Silence, which she wrote under her married name of Rosemary Curb. She pioneered the women's studies program at Rollins College in Florida and served as president of both the Orlando chapter of the National Organization for Women and the Southeast Women's Studies Association. She was also a board member of the National Women's Studies Association and chair of the organization's Lesbian Caucus.

== Early life and education ==
Rosemary Keefe was born on February 3, 1940, in Chicago, Cook County, Illinois to Dorothea Lee (née Gatzmeyer) and Jerry E. Keefe. Keefe grew up in an Irish-Catholic neighborhood and from the age of eight had decided she wanted to be a nun. She began her schooling in Chicago but during her high school years, the family moved to Madison, Wisconsin, where Jerry worked as the sales and promotion manager for Oscar Mayer and Company. She graduated with honors from Edgewood High School of the Sacred Heart in 1958. That year she joined the Dominican Order, as Sister Mary Geralda, in Sinsinawa, Wisconsin. They sent her to further her studies at Rosary College in River Forest, Illinois. She graduated with a Bachelor of Arts degree in 1962.

== Career ==
Upon completing her university studies, Keefe taught biology and religion at Dominican High School in Whitefish Bay, Wisconsin for three years. During her time as a nun, she had a relationship with an older nun, but believed that the experience was fueled by living in a women's community and did not recognize her sexuality at the time. She later wrote of her experiences in a book, Lesbian Path (1980), pondering if lesbians were motivated to join an order to escape heterosexuality, marriage and motherhood. Because of the oppressive nature of the convent, she left in 1965 and began her graduate studies at Wayne State College in Wayne, Nebraska. Simultaneously, she taught biology at the high school in Pender, Nebraska.

On April 30, 1966, Keefe married Charles Spencer Curb at Christ the King Catholic Church of Omaha. He was a professor who taught one of the night school courses Keefe attended. The following year, the couple had a daughter, Lisa. After five years of marriage, the couple divorced and Curb and her daughter lived with another male professor for two years while she completed her master's degree at the University of Arkansas in Fayetteville. That relationship ended in 1973, when Curb acknowledged her lesbianism. She was hired to teach at Missouri Southern State College in 1976 and completed her PhD from the University of Arkansas in 1977 with a dissertation, The Idea of the American Dream in Afro-American Plays of the 1960s. While teaching at Missouri Southern in Joplin, Missouri, Curb became active in the women's movement.

In 1979, Curb resigned from her teaching position after Missouri Southern made the decision to fire her based on claims that she had an unsatisfactory relationship with the administration, though her teaching statistics averaged 70 percent and above. Curb stated to Marta Poynor, a reporter with The Joplin Globe, that the firing was retaliation to a dispute with an administration official who barred her from using college facilities, specifically the mail room, to do her job. Curb sought legal advice over the issue because she was attempting to submit an article on lesbianism, which had been inadvertently left in a Xerox machine, for publication when the ban was placed. Her protest regarding the administrative "harassment" led to them withdrawing the nullification of her contract so that Curb could "resign in good standing".

A few months later, Curb was elected treasurer of the national organization, The Society for the Study of the Multi-Ethnic Literature of the United States and hired to teach at Rollins College in Winter Park, Florida. She taught English courses with a special focus on feminist and lesbian theater and founded the women's studies program, which she directed from 1979 to 1992. Curb became active in the National Women's Studies Association from 1979 and served as a board member of the organization in 1982 and again in 1983. She was chair of the Women's Studies Association's Lesbian Caucus from 1988 to 1990. She also served as president of both the Orlando chapter of the National Organization for Women and the Southeast Women's Studies Association during her tenure at Rollins.

In 1985, her publication with co-editor Nancy Manahan, Lesbian Nuns: Breaking Silence, was released. The book told the stories of fifty-one former nuns, as were both editors, who were lesbians. It was widely controversial and television stations which featured an interview with Curb and Manahan on the syndicated show Sally Jessy Raphael barred its airing in Baltimore, Boston, Philadelphia, Phoenix, Pittsburgh, and San Francisco. They also were criticized by representatives of the Catholic church and received death threats when they appeared in Dublin on a publicity tour in the United Kingdom. But, they also had a successful appearance on The Phil Donahue Show in April 1985 and went on a well-received national tour. Barbara Grier and Donna McBride, who owned Naiad Press the book's publisher, sold four of its stories to Penthouse Forum causing controversy in the lesbian community because the magazine was seen as an exploitative, erotic journal with a largely male heterosexual audience and the women had not given permission for their stories to be used. Despite the controversy, the book became a best-seller, rights were sold to make a movie, and a paperback edition was published, as well as a British edition.

In 1993, Curb left Rollins and moved back to Missouri. She began a relationship with Doris Burkemper and began using her maiden name again. Keefe served as an English professor from 1993 to 1999 and headed the English department until 1998 at Missouri State University in Springfield. Her book Amazon All-Stars (1996) was a finalist in the nominations of 1997 for best drama at the 9th Lambda Literary Awards. In 1999, she was the recipient of the Hellman/Hammett Award from Human Rights Watch. The following year, she moved to Superior, Wisconsin and served as faculty dean at the University of Wisconsin–Superior from 2000 to 2003 and an English and women's studies professor until 2007.

When Keefe retired, she and Burkemper moved to Corrales, New Mexico. She appeared on the Chautauqua circuit regularly, participating throughout venues across New Mexico in a reenactment, "Mabel Dodge Luhan in Taos". Luhan was an heiress who moved to Taos, New Mexico, married a local member of the Taos Pueblo, and established an artists' colony there. Keefe based the reenactment upon writings of Luhan and her quest for spiritual connections. In 2012, Keefe developed pulmonary fibrosis and moved back to Winter Park, Florida, near her daughter's home.

== Death and legacy ==
Keefe underwent a lung transplant at Duke University on April 16, but died from complications on May 24, 2012, in Durham, North Carolina, where she was cremated. According to Tracy Baim, one of the founders of the Windy City Times, Keefe and Manahan's book Lesbian Nuns is "one of the bestselling lesbian books of all time", and has been translated into multiple foreign languages and released in published versions in "Australia, Brazil, Britain, France, Germany, Holland, Ireland, Italy and Spain". Keefe is remembered for her pioneering role in the development of the field of women's studies, her activism, and for her hundreds of articles written on women playwrights and about feminist theater. Her papers are housed in the Sophia Smith Collection of Women's History at Smith College in Northampton, Massachusetts.

== Selected works ==
- Curb, Rosemary (1980). "Remember the Future". In Cruikshank, Margaret (ed.). The Lesbian Path: 37 Lesbian Writers Share Their Personal Experiences, Viewpoints, Traumas and Joys. Monterey, California: Angel Press. pp. 197–202. ISBN 978-0-912216-20-1.
- Curb, Rosemary K. (May 1980). "Fragmented Selves in Adrienne Kennedy's 'Funnyhouse of a Negro' and 'The Owl Answers'". Theatre Journal. 32 (2). Baltimore, Maryland: Johns Hopkins University Press: 180–195. doi:10.2307/3207111. ISSN 0192-2882. JSTOR 3207111. OCLC 47977909.
- Curb, Rosemary (Winter 1980). "An Unfashionable Tragedy of American Racism: Alice Childress's Wedding Band". MELUS. 7 (4). Los Angeles, California: The Society for the Study of the Multi-Ethnic Literature of the United States: 57–68. doi:10.2307/467168. ISSN 0163-755X. JSTOR 467168. OCLC 6911308412.
- Curb, Rosemary; Manahan, Nancy, eds. (1985). Lesbian Nuns: Breaking Silence (1st ed.). Tallahassee, FL: Naiad Press. ISBN 978-0-930044-62-6.
- Keefe Curb, Rosemary, ed. (1996). Amazon All stars: Thirteen Lesbian Plays, with Essays and Commentary. New York, New York: Applause Theatre and Cinema Books. ISBN 978-1-55783-220-7.
