= Joanne Passet =

American historian, librarian and writer (1954)

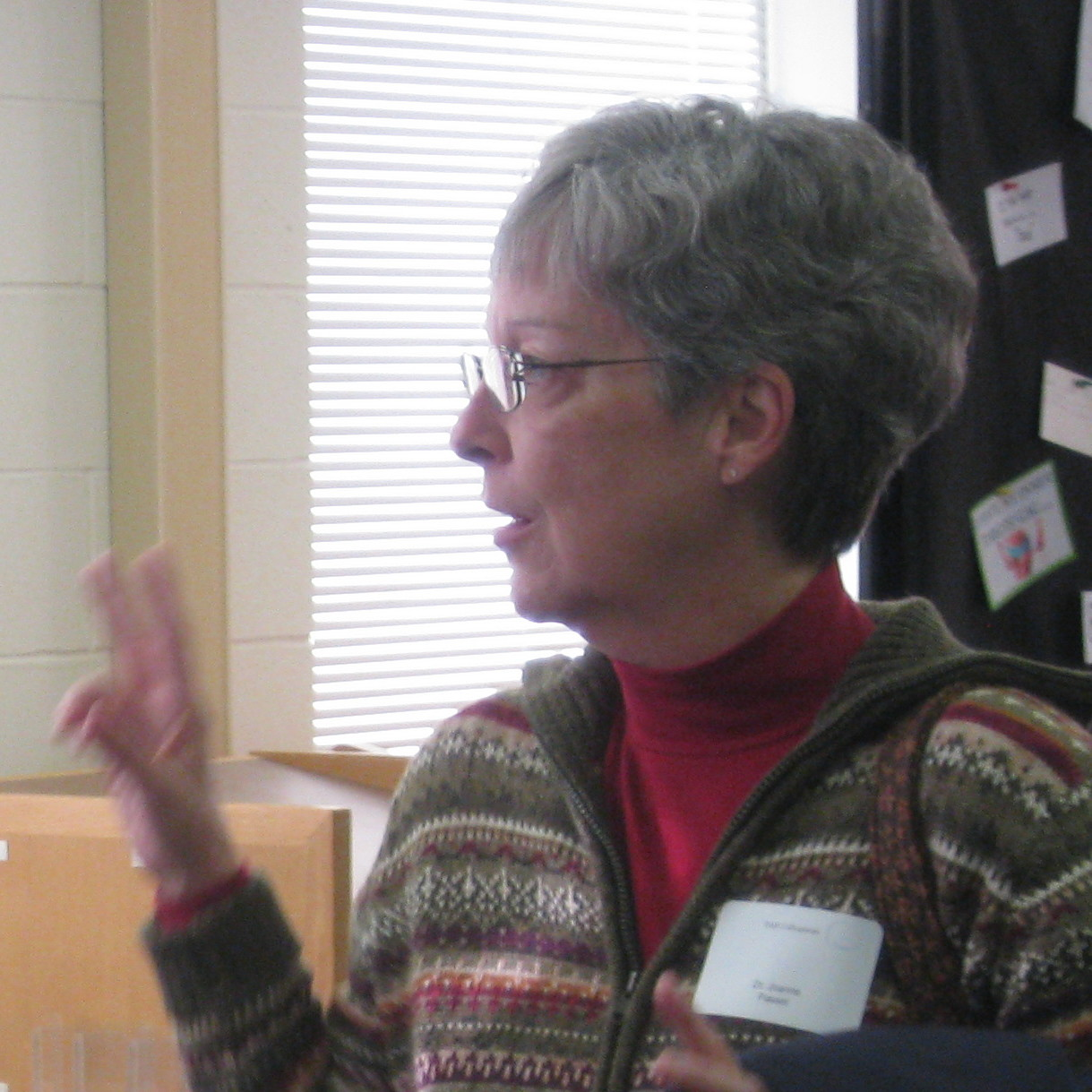
- Born: Joanne Ellen Passet; September 10, 1954 (age 71); Upper Sandusky, Ohio, U.S.
- Education: Bluffton College (B.A., 1975); Bowling Green State University (M.A., 1979); Indiana University Bloomington (M.L.S.; PhD)
- Occupations: Historian; librarian; writer
- Known for: Biographies

Joanne Ellen Passet (born September 10, 1954) is an American historian, teacher, librarian, and writer. She is a professor emeritus at Indiana University, where she taught history, and previously, library and information science. She has two doctorates, and is best known for two biographies, one of publisher Barbara Grier, and the other, of writer Jeannette Howard Foster, both of which were finalists for the Lambda Literary Award for Lesbian Memoir or Biography in 2017 and 2008 respectively. She has won several awards during her career, including a Fulbright scholarship and an award from the American Library Association.

== Career ==
Passet initially trained in the field of library and information science, completing her B.A. from Bluffton College (1975), M.A. from Bowling Green State University (1979), and M.L.S. (1980) and PhD (1988) from Indiana University Bloomington. She worked as a librarian in Indiana University, while teaching at both, the university's School of Library and Information Science and School of Education. In 1999, she went on to complete a second Ph.D. in history from the University of Wisconsin, graduating from their women's history program. After completing her doctorate in history, she taught women's studies and history at Indiana University's College of Arts and Sciences, and at Bluffton College and Dominican University, before becoming Dean of Indiana University's School of Humanities and Social Sciences. She retired in 2014 as professor emerita of history.

During her time at Indiana University, Passet received a number of awards, including a Fulbright Scholarship to teach at Nha Trang University in Vietnam, a Martin Luther King Jr. Award (2004) and the Justin Windsor Prize from the American Library Association (1994). She also was a member of the executive board of the Indiana Women's History Association. Indiana University East has established a scholarship in her honor, named the Joanne Passet Research Scholarship for their undergraduate honors program.

Passet has written a number of books relating to women's history and LGBT history in the United States of America. In 2008, she published a biography of American writer Jeannette Howard Foster titled Sex Variant Woman: The Life of Jeannette Howard Foster, which was a finalist for the Lambda Literary Award for Lesbian Memoir or Biography in 2008, and was described as "...well-researched, thorough, and engaging." It also won a Stonewall Book Award Honor in Non-Fiction in 2009. Her book, Indomitable: The Life of Barbara Grier was a biographical account of American publisher Barbara Grier, who ran the Naiad Press. It was a finalist for the Lambda Literary Award for Lesbian Memoir or Biography in 2017, with the book being described as "...narratively compelling and extensive".

== Publications ==
- (1994) Cultural Crusaders: Women Librarians and the American West (Albuquerque: University of New Mexico Press) ISBN 0-8263-1530-5
- (1994) (with Mary Niles Maack) Aspirations and Mentoring in an Academic Environment (Greenwood Press) ISBN 0-313-27836-9
- (2003) Sex Radicals and the Quest for Women’s Equality (Champaign: University of Illinois Press) ISBN 9-780-25202-8045
- (2008) Sex Variant Woman: The Life of Jeanette Howard Foster (Da Capo Press) ISBN 9-780-78672-1542
- (2016) Indomitable: The Life of Barbara Grier, (Bella Books) ISBN 9-781-59493-4711
