= Lesbian Nuns: Breaking Silence =

1985 book

- Latest Cover for Lesbian Nuns: Breaking Silence (1985/2013)
- Editor: Nancy Manahan & Rosemary Keefe Curb
- Language: English
- Genre: Non-fiction
- Publisher: Naiad Press nka Spinsters Ink
- Publication date: May 24, 1985/new ed. 2013
- ISBN: 978-1-935226-63-5

Lesbian Nuns: Breaking Silence is an anthology edited by Rosemary Curb and Nancy Manahan and originally published by Naiad Press in 1985, and later reissued by Spinsters Ink in 2013. It compiles the experience of 51 women who are or were nuns.

== Development and content ==
Development on the book began when Manahan posted a notice to find former nuns who identified as lesbians. Curb was one of about 60 women who responded to the notice, and the two began collaborating. They began publishing questionnaires through gay and lesbian bookstores, ultimately collecting about 600 responses. From those 600 responses, 350 women submitted more detailed accounts of their lives. The 51 stories shared in the anthology were curated from these 350 pieces.

Most of the women who submitted had not considered themselves lesbians when they entered religious life. Of those profiled in the book, 42 had chosen to leave religious life, although whether this was primarily due to their lesbian identity is unclear.

== Reception ==
The book was controversial with Catholic authorities prior to release. In April 1985, after the two authors were interviewed by The Boston Globe ahead of the book's release, the Archdiocese of Boston intervened to prevent a local television show from broadcasting an interview with the two women. In response, The Boston Globe began a campaign against the diocese, criticizing them for infringing freedom of speech. Religious opposition would continue; when Curb and Manahan promoted their book on The Late Late Show in Ireland, a group held a prayer vigil outside the studio. The two women also had their hotel reservations cancelled. However, Irish reception was not entirely negative; contemporary reports said that "the book's publisher in Ireland was trying to get extra copies of the book to meet demand raised by the publicity".

As a result of the controversy, the book received more coverage in the media. The book, which had been at first only carried by LGBTQ bookstores, was "moved to the front stands of the large book chains, Dalton and Waldenbooks". A month after its release, there was enough demand that a third printing was done, creating 150,000 total copies on the market.

In academic and literary circles, the book was largely well received. An Associated Press review did note that they wished the book had dug deeper into why the women who had left had chosen to leave, how those who remained in religious life reconciled their lesbian identity with their vows of chastity, and whether heterosexual women in religious life also felt similarly restrained.

== Later editions ==
Since its initial release, Lesbian Nuns has been released in or translated for markets in Australia, Brazil, England, France, Germany, Ireland, Italy, the Netherlands, New Zealand, and Spain.

The 2013 edition, published by Bella Books with a new cover in paperback and eBook, includes a foreword by historian Joanne Passet, an afterword by Rosemary Keefe Curb (created by Nancy Manahan from Keefe Curb's unfinished memoir after her death in 2012), the Windy City Times obituary ("Lesbian Nuns co-editor Rosemary Keefe Dies") and an afterword by Nancy Manahan.

ABC-TV purchased film rights for the book, although a film has not been produced as of 2026.
