= Sex Variant Woman =

2008 biography of Jeannette Howard Foster

- Author: Joanne Passet
- Language: English
- Genre: Biography
- Publisher: Da Capo Press
- Publication date: 2008
- Publication place: United States
- Pages: 353
- ISBN: 978-0-7867-1822-1

Sex Variant Woman: The Life of Jeannette Howard Foster is a biography of Jeannette Howard Foster, a pioneer in lesbian studies, by American historian Joanne Passet. It was published in 2008 by Da Capo Press. The book includes a foreword by Lillian Faderman.

== Critical reception ==
In a review for The American Historical Review, Leila J. Rupp wrote: "This is a fascinating story of an extraordinary woman in lesbian history. Passet clearly admires her subject, even though she notes the racism and snobbishness that was part of her background." Martha Vicinus' review for The Women's Review of Books said: "I admire Passet's thorough research, but I wish she had taken a step back to focus on the ways in which Foster's life was both exceptional and representative of the generation of lesbians between the new women of the 1920s and the gay liberationists of the 1970s." Publishers Weekly found it ironic that the book devotes more attention to Foster's personal life than her professional achievements. Nonetheless, the review concluded that "Passet does justice to Foster's important place in both literary and lesbian culture."
