= Anyda Marchant =

Fiction author

- Born: Anne Nelson Yarborough De Armond Marchant; January 27, 1911; Rio de Janeiro, Brazil
- Died: January 11, 2006 (aged 94)
- Resting place: Rehoboth Beach, Delaware
- Occupation: Lawyer • Author
- Writing career
- Pen name: Sarah Aldridge
- Genre: Lesbian pulp fiction • Romance Fiction
- Notable work: The Latecomer (1974)

Anyda Nelson Yarborough De Armond Marchant (January 27, 1911 – January 11, 2006) was a Brazilian-born American lawyer, one of the first women to pass the Bar in Washington D.C., and a founding partner of Naiad Press and A&M Books. She was also an author of primarily lesbian fiction, for which she wrote under the pseudonym Sarah Aldridge.

== Early life ==
Marchant was born in Rio de Janeiro, Brazil to Langworthy Marchant and Maude H Arnett. One year after her, Marchant's younger brother, Alexander was born.

Marchant's full birth name was Anne Nelson Yarborough De Armond Marchant, but early into life (at least by 1930), she began to shorten her name to Anyda, an acronym for her full name.

By the time she was five, Marchant and her family moved to Washington, D.C. This move was spurred because Marchant's father had been appointed chief of the Translation Bureau of the Ministry of Agriculture of the Brazilian government. According to Marchant's obituary in The Washington Post, she told USA Today in a 1992 article that she recalled as a young girl seeing women in the suffragist movement "being arrested in Lafayette Park and bundled into paddy wagons."

Sadly, when Marchant was just eighteen, her father died suddenly.

== Education ==
Marchant received her undergraduate degree in 1931 and then went on to law school at George Washington University, which at the time was known as the National University of Washington, D.C. Amidst her studies, Marchant worked for a year as a junior law assistant for women's rights pioneer, Alice Paul, who at the time was working on the ERA draft. Marchant deemed Paul "among the very greatest of the feminists."

Marchant graduated from George Washington University in 1933 and became one of the first women to pass the Bar Exam and practice law in Washington, D.C., and before the US Court of Claims and the US Supreme Court.

By 1940, Marchant had moved with her mother and brother to Baltimore County.

== Career ==
Before her career as an author, Marchant had a 40-year law career. In 1940, she was appointed assistant in the Law Library of Congress in the Latin American Law section. When the man who was head of the Anglo-American Law Section was drafted in World War II, Marchant took his place. When he returned in 1945, the man took his position back, and Marchant refused to work a lower job.

Marchant returned to Rio de Janeiro to work as attorney for a Canadian power company. She also had a brief stint as a translator at the 1948 Pan-American Union conference in Bogotá, Colombia.

She then went back to Washington D.C. in late 1948 and became one of four women attorneys at Covington and Burling, Dean Acheson's firm. It was at this job that Marchant would meet her lifelong partner, Muriel Crawford, who worked there as an administrative assistant.

Marchant served the World Bank as an attorney in the Legal Department for 18 years until retiring in 1972.

Marchant wrote some short stories for the lesbian magazine, The Ladder. Through this writing, Marchant was introduced to Barbara Grier, when Grier edited and published one of Marchant's stories. When The Ladder ceased publication in 1972, Marchant and Grier longed for a new avenue for lesbian writing and literature. Thus, Naiad Press was co-founded in 1973 by Anyda Marchant, Muriel Crawford, Barbara Grier, and Grier's partner, Donna McBride.

Naiad Press was founded, in part, to publish Marchant's first books under the Sarah Aldridge pen name. Marchant did not believe any other publisher would want it, because of its lesbian content. Naiad Press was made possible when Marchant provided $2000 from her retirement income to the publishing of Naiad's first few books. The first book published by Naiad Press was Sarah Aldridge's The Latecomer in 1974. It was said to be the first lesbian novel to have a happy ending.

Under the name Sarah Aldridge, Marchant was the author of fourteen literary lesbian works, eleven of which were published by Naiad Press.

Naiad Press went on to become the most successful lesbian publishing house. Marchant served as Naiad's President from its inception, up until the mid-1990s. In 1992, after a publishing dispute, Marchant and Crawford left Naiad Press. They took with them the existing stock of all Sarah Aldridge books.

After their departure, Marchant and Crawford founded A&M Books. They mostly published the remaining few Sarah Aldridge books, along with works from other authors, such as Ann Allen Shockley.

== Personal life ==
Marchant met Muriel Inez Crawford (April 21, 1914 – June 7, 2006) in 1947 and they became a couple in 1948, though they remained largely in the closet until the '90s. The couple was together for 57 years until Aldridge's death.

In 1965, Marchant and Crawford became permanent residents of Rehoboth Beach, Delaware, a place that was known for its LGBT community. There, the two had weekly 'Salons' on their porch.

Marchant only officially came out of the closet in 1990 with a public appearance at a Lambda Rising Bookstore.

Marchant and Crawford remained together in Rehoboth until the end of their lives. During winters, they lived in Lighthouse Point, Florida.

== Death ==
Marchant died two weeks shy of her ninety-fifth birthday in 2006. Muriel Crawford died five months later.

Marchant was awarded the Golden Crown Literary Society Trailblazer Award posthumously in June 2007.

Marchant's first novel, The Latecomer, was reissued in 2009 as a 35th-anniversary edition by A&M Books. In addition to the novel, editor Fay Jacobs collected essays from a vast array of lesbian icons attesting to Aldridge's lasting impact as a pioneer of early lesbian writing. This volume became the first of her work to appear in digital format in 2009.

== Notable works ==
=== Written as Sarah Aldridge ===
- The Latecomer (1974)
- Tottie: A Tale of the Sixties (1975)
- Cytherea's Breath (1976)
- All True Lovers (1978)
- The Nesting Place (1982)
- Madame Aurora (1983)
- Misfortune's Friend (1985)
- Magdalena (1987)
- Keep to Me Stranger (1989)
- A Flight of Angels (1992)
- Michaela (1994)
