= Jeannette Howard Foster =

American writer

- Born: November 3, 1895; Oak Park, Illinois
- Died: July 26, 1981 (aged 85)
- Education: Rockford College; University of Chicago
- Occupations: Librarian; professor; poet; scholar

Jeannette Howard Foster (November 3, 1895 – July 26, 1981) was an American librarian, professor, poet, and researcher in the field of lesbian literature. She pioneered the study of popular fiction and ephemera in order to excavate both overt and covert lesbian themes. Her years of pioneering data collection culminated in her 1957 study Sex Variant Women in Literature, which has become a seminal resource in LGBT studies. Initially self-published by Foster via Vantage Press, it was photoduplicated and reissued in 1975 by Diana Press and reissued in 1985 by Naiad Press with updating additions and commentary by Barbara Grier.

== Biography ==
Jeannette Howard Foster was born on November 3, 1895, in Oak Park, Illinois, daughter of mechanical engineer Winslow Howard Foster (b. January 10, 1869) and Anna Mabel Burr. Her family originated from New England, and at least three of their female ancestors were condemned as witches in the seventeenth century. After being sent to Sunday School aged 4, Foster developed an infatuation with a female teacher there, and in 1908 came across a story in St. Nicholas Magazine in which a girl develops an infatuation with an older girl at boarding school. This first encounter with female same-sex desire in print marked the beginning of her search for female 'sex variants' in literature.

Foster's mother insisted her daughter's become self sufficient through being educated. Foster attended the University of Chicago, before transferring to Rockford College and graduated with a degree in chemistry in 1918. In 1920 she returned to the University of Chicago and earned an MA in English in 1922. Foster spent a period teaching at various institutions before earning a BLS from the Emory University Library School in 1932. In 1935 she received a Ph.D. from the Graduate Library School of the University of Chicago. Foster taught library science at the Drexel Institute of Technology from 1937 to 1948, and went on to become the librarian at the Institute for Sex Research at Indiana University during the years 1948 to 1952, where she worked with Alfred Kinsey.

In 1952 Foster left the Institute for Sex Research to move to Kansas City with her partner Hazel Toliver (1909–1997), and Toliver's mother. Foster started a new position at the University of Missouri- Kansas City (UMKC) as a reference and interlibrary loan librarian. It was while working at UMKC, in 1957, that Foster published her book Sex Variant Women in Literature: A Historical and Quantitative Survey. Foster had spent over two decades researching and writing the work, the first of its kind, which chronicled approximately 2600 years of female 'sex variants' (lesbians, bisexuals and transsexuals) in literature. In 1960 Foster retired from UMKC and moved to St. Charles with Toliver, her mother, and another lesbian companion of Toliver's, Dorothy Ross (1905–1986). They lived there until 1974, when Toliver retired and they all decided to finally settle in Pocahontas, Arkansas. Foster's health had begun to decline in the mid-1960s, and on 7 January 1974 she had lumbar spinal surgery which left her with nerve damage. Foster opted to move into a nursing home to avoid burdening her companions with her care, and on 1 April 1975 she moved into the nearby Randolph County Nursing Home.

Foster was the recipient of the 1974 Stonewall Book Award for Sex Variant Women in Literature. She contributed fiction and reviews to The Ladder. Foster lived to see her 1956 book hailed as a founding document of a new area of scholarship. She was friends with Valerie Taylor and Marie Kuda, who founded the first national lesbian writers' conference in the United States. Taylor dedicated the first conference in 1974 to Foster. In October 1974, after Foster was awarded the Stonewall Book Award, Valerie Taylor published a tribute to her in the Chicago Gay Crusader, underlining the importance of Sex Variant Women in Literature and describing it as a sourcebook not just for homophile researchers but also for literature lovers, social trends students, and those who fight for human liberation.

In 1998 Foster was inducted into the Chicago Gay and Lesbian Hall of Fame.

In 2008, the first biography of Foster, Sex Variant Woman by Joanne Passet, was published. In 2019, Foster was inducted into the Chicago Literary Hall of Fame.
