= Katherine V. Forrest =

Canadian-born American writer (born 1939)

- Born: 1939 (age 86–87) Windsor, Ontario, Canada
- Occupation: Novelist, editor
- Period: 20th century
- Genre: Mystery
- Subject: Lesbian literature
- Spouse: Jo Hercus

Website
- katherinevforrest.com

Katherine V. Forrest (born 1939) is a Canadian-born American writer, best known for her novels about lesbian police detective Kate Delafield. Her books have won and been finalists for Lambda Literary Award twelve times, as well as other awards. She has been referred to by some "a founding mother of lesbian fiction writing."

== Personal life ==
Forrest was born in 1939 in Windsor, Ontario.

She currently lives with her wife, Jo Hercus, in Palm Springs, California.

== Career ==
Forrest is best known for her nine novels about Kate Delafield, the first lesbian police detective in the American lesbian mystery genre and is described as "Miss Marple with k.d. lang, Sherlock Holmes with Candace Gingrich, and you've got Kate Delafield: ex-Marine, homicide detective for the LAPD, queer-as-the-day-is-long heroine." The second novel in the series, Murder at the Nightwood Bar, was optioned for film by director Tim Hunter. The screenplay had been written and roles cast with Mary-Louise Parker as Delafield and Tom Arnold as her police partner, but the project was ultimately shelved.

Her romance Curious Wine is considered a classic of American lesbian literature. In discussion of the "light" element of the lesbian romance Forrest said, "I think it's political as hell... Here were two women who had a lot of choices in life, a lot of options, and out of all of those options they chose the hardest one, which was to love each other." The novel is credited as one that "broke through many misconceptions about lesbians and lesbian relationships."

Of her personal political sensibilities, Forrest said, "We are the only subculture that incorporates both genders, all races, all colors, all creeds... Being visible can make us free...and give us a power we have never known." After relocating from Los Angeles to San Francisco, near The Castro district, she said, "It would be impossible to live here and not be political." This was a marked departure from her early life, of which she wrote, "Even after I committed the Big Sin and made that irrevocable passage, and even though I thereafter found women who loved me, and even though I had loving relationships, I remained essentially in the grip of all the early shame and my own powerful homophobia."

Her work is also noted for unprecedented eroticism and display of lesbian sexuality. Forrest noted that classic mysteries such as Agatha Christie might not even contain a hug. "Sexuality is a part of life and it's something that readers are interested in as far as characters... Love scenes are unparalleled opportunities to characterize a major character and bring out aspects of them that you can't in normal everyday scenes."

Forrest had a ten-year tenure as fiction editor at Naiad Press. She founded and currently serves as Supervising Editor at Spinsters Ink, as well as serving as the editor at large at Bella Books. She has also written science fiction novels and edited numerous anthologies of gay and lesbian interest. As an editor, she worked with hundreds of writers, including Jane Rule and Lee Lynch, who wrote of Forrest's fiction, "Her stories embrace and strengthen us, and give us permission to live our lives fully just as we are."

Also known for her reviews and articles about lesbian and gay publishing, Forrest authored book reviews appearing in the Los Angeles Times and San Francisco Chronicle. Articles have appeared in Brother and Sister, The Harvard Gay and Lesbian Review and The Lambda Book Report.

== Awards and honors ==
Forrest was a recipient of the Lambda Literary Foundation's Pioneer Award in 1999 and currently serves on their board of trustees. She received the Alice B Readers Award in 2005 and in 2008, received the Golden Crown Literary Society's Trailblazer Award, as well as the Bill Whitehead Award for Lifetime Achievement from Publishing Triangle.

Awards and honors for Forrest's writing
Year	Title	Award/Honor	Result	Ref.
1990	The Beverly Malibu	Lambda Literary Award for Lesbian Mystery	Winner	
1992	Murder by Tradition	Lambda Literary Award for Lesbian Mystery	Winner	
1993	Erotic Naiad	Lambda Literary Award for Lesbian Anthology	Finalist	
1997	Liberty Square	Lambda Literary Award for Lesbian Mystery	Finalist	
1998	Apparition Alley	Lambda Literary Award for Lesbian Mystery	Finalist	
2000	Sleeping Bones	Lambda Literary Award for Lesbian Mystery	Finalist	
2003	Daughters of an Amber Noon	Lambda Literary Award for Science Fiction, Fantasy and Horror	Finalist	
2005	Hancock Park	Lambda Literary Award for Lesbian Mystery	Winner	
2006	Daughters of an Emerald Dusk	Lambda Literary Award for Science Fiction, Fantasy and Horror	Winner	
2006	Women of Mystery	Lambda Literary Award for Lesbian Mystery	Finalist	
2006	Lesbian Pulp Fiction	Lambda Literary Award for Anthology	Finalist	
2008	Love, Castro Street	Goldie Award for Anthology (Non-Erotica)	Winner	
2014	High Desert	Lambda Literary Award for Lesbian Mystery	Winner	
2018	Lethal Care	Goldie Award for Mystery / Thriller	Winner	
2023	Delafield	Goldie Award for Mystery / Thriller	Winner	

== Publications ==
=== Coral Dawn trilogy ===
- Daughters of A Coral Dawn. 1984, ISBN 0-930044-50-9
- Daughters of an Amber Noon. 2002, ISBN 1-55583-663-1
- Daughters of an Emerald Dusk. 2005, ISBN 1-55583-823-5

=== Kate Delafield Mysteries ===
- Amateur City. 1984, ISBN 0-930044-55-X
- Murder at The Nightwood Bar. 1987, ISBN 0-930044-92-4
- The Beverly Malibu. 1989, ISBN 0-941483-47-9
- Murder by Tradition. 1991, ISBN 0-941483-89-4
- Liberty Square. 1996, ISBN 0-425-15467-X
- Apparition Alley. 1997, ISBN 0-425-15966-3
- Sleeping Bones. 1999, ISBN 0-425-17029-2
- Hancock Park. 2004, ISBN 0-425-19598-8
- High Desert. 2013, ISBN 978-1-93522-665-9
- Delafield, 2022. ISBN 978-1-93-522689-5

=== Other novels ===
- Curious Wine. 1983, ISBN 0-930044-43-6
- An Emergence of Green. 1986, ISBN 0-930044-69-X
- Flashpoint. 1994, ISBN 1-56280-043-4
- Lethal Care. 2017, with Claire McNab, ISBN 978-1-59-493581-7.

=== Short story collections ===
- Dreams and Swords. 1987, ISBN 0-941483-03-7
- The Gift
- Jessie: A Kate Delafield Story
- Benny's Place
- Xessex
- Force Majeur
- Mother Was an Alien (excerpt from Daughters of a Coral Dawn)
- Mandy Larkin
- Survivor
- O Captain, My Captain. 2013.
- The Test

=== Anthology contributions ===
- Mom: Candid Memoirs by Lesbians About the First Woman in Their Life, edited by Nisa Donnelly, 1998. ISBN 978-1-55-583408-1.
- "Jeanie" in The Milk of Human Kindness: Lesbian Authors Write About Mothers and Daughters, edited by Lori L. Lake. 2005, ISBN 1-932300-28-7.
- Lesbians on the Loose: Crime Writers on the Lam, edited by Lori L. Lake and Jessie Chandler, 2015.

=== Anthologies edited ===
- The Erotic Naiad: Love Stories by Naiad Press Authors. 1992, with Barbara Grier, ISBN 1-56280-026-4
- Diving Deep: Erotic Lesbian Love Stories. 1993, with Barbara Grier, ISBN 1-872642-14-4
- The Romantic Naiad: Love Stories by Naiad Press Authors. 1993, with Barbara Grier, ISBN 1-56280-054-X
- The Mysterious Naiad: Love Stories by Naiad Press Authors. 1994, with Barbara Grier, ISBN 1-56280-074-4
- Diving Deeper: More Erotic Lesbian Love Stories. 1994, with Barbara Grier, ISBN 1-872642-22-5
- Deeply Mysterious: Erotic Lesbian Stories. 1995, with Barbara Grier, ISBN 1-872642-31-4
- All in the Seasoning: And Other Holiday Stories. 2002, ISBN 1-887237-04-6
- Women of Mystery. 2005, ISBN 978-1-56023-543-9.
- Lesbian Pulp Fiction: The Sexually Intrepid World of Lesbian Paperback Novels 1950–1965. 2005, ISBN 1-57344-210-0
- Love, Castro Street: Reflections of San Francisco. 2007, with Jim Van Buskirk, ISBN 978-1-55583-997-0,

== See also ==
- Golden Crown Literary Society
- Lambda Literary Foundation
- Lesbian literature
- Naiad Press
- Spinsters Ink
