= Gale Wilhelm =

American novelist (1908–1991)

- Born: April 26, 1908; Eugene, Oregon
- Died: July 11, 1991 (aged 83); Berkeley, California
- Occupation: Writer
- Partner(s): Helen Hope Rudolph Page; Kathleen Huebner
- Writing career
- Period: 1934–43
- Notable works: We Too Are Drifting (1935); Torchlight to Valhalla (1938)

Gale Wilhelm (April 26, 1908 – July 11, 1991) was an American writer most noted for two books that featured lesbian themes written in the 1930s: We Too Are Drifting and Torchlight to Valhalla.

== Early life ==
Wilhelm was born April 26, 1908, in Eugene, Oregon, to Ethel Gale Brewer and Wilson Price Wilhelm in 1908. She was the youngest of five children. By age ten, she had moved to Boise, Idaho with her mother and siblings, but seemingly, her father was absent at this time.

In 1921, Wilhelm’s sister closest in age to her, Louise, died. This death may have been what spurred Gale’s move back to Oregon by 1923. Wilhelm completed high school, and spent at least ninth grade at Medford High School in Medford, Oregon.

By 1930, Wilhelm had moved with her family to California. At 21 years old, she lived in Berkeley, CA with her sister, Nina Clark in Clark's family home, along with Nina’s husband and their three children.

== Writing career ==
Wilhelm published several short stories in 1934 and 1935, her first appearing in Literary America.

Wilhelm's first novel, We Too Are Drifting was published in 1935 by Random House, to many favorable reviews. After the publication, Wilhelm worked as associate editor of Literary America, living in New York for one year. She then returned to the Bay Area. Her second novel, No Letters for the Dead, about a woman who resorts to prostitution while her lover awaits execution for the murder of his wife, was published in 1936.

In 1938, Random House published Torchlight to Valhalla, Wilhelm's second lesbian-themed novel in which the protagonist, a young woman, is pursued by a very handsome and charming young man, but realizes her true happiness is with another young woman.

Wilhelm wrote three more novels, Bring Home the Bride in 1940, The Time Between in 1942 and Never Let Me Go in 1945, all with heterosexual themes. Never Let Me Go included praise from Wilhelm's friend Carl Sandburg on the book jacket.

In 1943, Wilhelm received an honorary membership in the International Mark Twain Society for her “outstanding contribution in the field of fiction”.

Wilhelm also published stories in Colliers and Yale Review in the early 1940s, but didn't publish anything new after 1943. However, both Wilhelm's lesbian themed books were reprinted many times in the 1940s, 1950s, and 1960s. Torchlight to Valhalla was given a new name, The Strange Path, with a rather salacious cover in 1953.

In 1975, Torchlight to Valhalla was reprinted by Arno Press's library edition of Homosexuality: Lesbians and Gay Men in Society, History and Literature.

Wilhelm is now lauded for prose imitating, if not on par, with Hemingway’s, as well as her accomplishment in We Too Are Drifting of taking the lesbian narrative away from the root of homosexuality and instead creating a discourse on gendered and sexual dynamics in lesbian relationships that had been scarcely written about at the time.

== Personal life ==
Wilhelm lived with Helen Hope Rodolf Page in Oakdale, California from 1938 until the late 1940s. When they first started living together, they lived along with Page’s mother, and Wilhelm is written in the 1940 census as a “friend” of the household. Wilhelm then moved to Berkeley, where the 1950 census records her living with Kathleen Huebner. The census identifies Wilhelm's relationship as "partner" and her work as "writer," although there is no evidence that Wilhelm was publishing anything under her own name by that time.

Barbara Grier spent several years attempting to locate Wilhelm. The 1984 Naiad Press edition of We Too Are Drifting included a foreword by Grier describing Wilhelm's life and pleading for any assistance from anyone who knew any information on the whereabouts of Wilhelm. Grier speculated that Wilhelm stopped writing before she turned 40 years old because "the world would not let her write the books she wanted." In 1985, Grier received an anonymous note pointing her to Wilhelm, who was living in Berkeley. She found Wilhelm aged and ill, but delighted that her books were still being read and enjoyed. By the time Naiad Press reprinted Torchlight to Valhalla in 1985, it contained a foreword by Wilhelm herself, an autobiographical sketch.

Wilhelm lived with her partner, Kathleen Huebner until Wilhelm died in 1991 of cancer.

== Published works ==
- We Too Are Drifting, 1935
- No Letters for the Dead, 1936
- Torchlight to Valhalla, 1938 (also published in the 1950s as The Strange Path)
- Bring Home the Bride, 1940
- The Time Between, 1942
- Never Let Me Go, 1945
