= Barbara Grier =

American writer and publisher (1933–2011)

- Grier in 1989
- Born: November 4, 1933; Cincinnati, Ohio, US
- Died: November 10, 2011 (aged 78); Tallahassee, Florida, US
- Other names: Gene Damon (pseudonym)
- Occupations: Editor and Publisher
- Known for: Editing The Ladder; Cofounding Naiad Press
- Partner(s): Helen Bennett; Donna McBride

Barbara Glycine Grier (November 4, 1933 – November 10, 2011) was an American writer and publisher. She is credited as one of the leaders of the women in print movement during second-wave feminism, responsible for building the lesbian book industry. After editing The Ladder magazine, published by the lesbian civil rights group Daughters of Bilitis, she co-founded a lesbian book-publishing company Naiad Press, which achieved publicity and became the world's largest publisher of lesbian books. She built a major collection of lesbian literature, catalogued with detailed indexing of topics.

== Early life ==
Barbara Glycine Grier was born on November 4, 1933, in Cincinnati, Ohio. Her mother was Dorothy Vernon Black, a secretary, and her father was Philip Strang Grier, a doctor. Grier had two siblings, Diane and Penni Grier. Her sister Diane was also a lesbian, a fact Barbara attributed to how feminist their mother was, as well as genetics. Barbara said of Diane, “She’s just like me, except nice. I’m the evil twin.” She also had two half-siblings (William Frederick and Brewster Grier) from her father's previous marriage to Iva Schackenberger.

Her parents separated when she was 10 and divorced when she was 13 years old. Grier grew up in several midwestern US cities, spending most of her life between Kansas City, Missouri, and Kansas City, Kansas.

Grier realized she was a lesbian at age twelve after researching the topic at the library. She told her mother that she was homosexual, and her mother replied, "No, because you're a woman, you're a lesbian. And since 12 years old is too young to make such a decision, let's wait six months before we tell the newspapers." Yet, Grier's mother was supportive. When Grier was fifteen, her mother gifted her a copy of The Well of Loneliness by Radclyffe Hall and Of Lena Geyer (1936) by Marcia Davenport. This would be the start of Grier's collection of lesbian literature. She describes her collection of lesbian-themed books as Lesbiana, a collection that was fueled by a "love affair with lesbian publishing."

Shortly after Grier graduated high school in 1951, she met Helen Bennett in a public library. They fell in love. They spent 20 years together living in Denver, Colorado, while Bennett went to library school, then moving to Kansas City where both worked in public libraries. Grier referred to their partnership as a marriage.

== Career ==
=== The Ladder ===
In 1957, Grier subscribed to The Ladder, a magazine edited by members of the Daughters of Bilitis. Grier began writing book reviews for The Ladder, using multiple pen names in her writings including Gene Damon, Marilyn Barrow, Gladys Casey, Terry Cook, Dorthy Lyle, Vern Niven, Lennox Strong, and Lee Stuart.

The Ladder was the center of Grier's life in the 1950s and 60s. Some issues were completely written by her. At this time, Grier also contributed to other gay publications like ONE and Mattachine Review. Grier worked as The Ladder's poetry and fiction editor from 1966 until 1968, when Grier took over editing The Ladder with the goal of expanding the magazine to include more feminist ideals. The magazine gained a more professional and sleeker layout and increased to more than 40 pages from the 25 average under previous editors and tripled in subscriptions. She described her roles in editing the magazine, "In 1968, I became editor of The Ladder, and I had to write three hundred letters a week, edit the magazine, run a staff of fifteen people spread all over the world, work a part-time job, keep house, read the books, and write my 'Lesbiana' column." Grier also removed the word "lesbian" from the front cover, after being placed there in 1963, in an attempt to reach more women.

Grier's lesbian book review column in The Ladder, 'Lesbiana', was significant in the development of shared lesbian identity and a lesbian literary canon. Grier's mission was to review any book that contained lesbian content, regardless of genre or literary quality. At the time, many lesbian pulp novels were considered "trash," but Grier recognized their importance to lesbians in small towns in middle America, where she had grown up.

Grier's tenure took place at a time when the Daughters of Bilitis were in conflict about the direction of the organization. DOB founders tended to encourage a more assimilationist stance for the organization and came in direct conflict with more radical separatist lesbians, including Grier. When the DOB folded in 1970, Grier, who was editing the magazine from Kansas City, planned with DOB president Rita LaPorte to take the only two copies of the subscription list from the printer and the DOB headquarters in order to keep The Ladder alive. LaPorte took both copies to the ignorance of DOB founders Phyllis Lyon and Del Martin, and relocated the magazine to Reno, causing an uproar. The Ladder ran for two more years before it outgrew its finances and folded in September 1972. Said Grier about her role in the controversy, "You have to understand that none of these things were done with malice aforethought or with intention to damage. I mean I was just as much a light-eyed maniac then as I am now in terms of the mission. The mission is that the lesbians shall inherit the earth, you see."

After The Ladder ceased publication in 1972, the continuing demand for that material resulted in four cumulative volumes that Grier edited by herself or with Coletta Reid.

==== Grier Ratings ====
During the 1960s, while Grier worked at The Ladder, she was involved in the creation of a bibliography of lesbian literature, The Lesbian in Literature. She used the name Gene Damon for this bibliography but her rating system for lesbian literature would come to be known as Grier Ratings. Grier rated lesbian literature on a letter scale for how prominent the lesbian subject was to the story and a range of 1 to 3 asterisks for the quality of the representation:

- A rating of 'A***' had lesbian characters with very sympathetic portrayals.
- A rating of 'A' without an asterisk meant there was a major lesbian component but not sympathetically portrayed.
- The B and C ratings were for works with lesbian subplots or suppressed/coded lesbian themes.
- Books that contained voyeuristic and demeaning representations of lesbians were rated as 'T (Trash)'.

=== Naiad Press ===
In 1973, Grier co-founded Naiad Press along with Donna McBride, Anyda Marchant, and Muriel Crawford (Marchant's partner). They founded the venture with $2,000 pooled between them. The press was part of the burgeoning women in print movement, which sought to create alternative, autonomous communications networks created by and for women. Unlike some of her peers in the movement, Grier did not have a college education and worked day jobs as a secretary and bill collector. Naiad started in Reno, Nevada and subsequently moved to Kansas City, Missouri and finally Tallahassee, Florida in 1979.

Naiad's first publication was a novel titled The Latecomer (1974), by Anyda Marchant, written under her pseudonym Sarah Aldridge. The cover art came from lesbian artist Tee Corinne. Their initial audience came from the mailing list for The Ladder. Grier and McBride ran Naiad from Kansas City until 1980 when it relocated to Tallahassee, Florida. Both Grier and McBride continued to work other full-time jobs until 1982 when they dedicated all their time to the publishing company. Naiad Press went on to become the world's largest publisher of lesbian books.

Naiad's inventory included mysteries, romances, and science fiction novels. The press also reprinted classics of lesbian writing, including Ann Bannon's Beebo Brinker series. Naiad also produced non-fiction books. Rosemary Curb and Nancy Manahan's Lesbian Nuns: Breaking Silence (1985) was among the most successful. Authors represented by Naiad include Valerie Taylor, Katherine V. Forrest, Jane Rule, Sarah Schulman, Barbara Wilson, Lee Lynch, Isabel Miller, Ann Bannon's reprinted Beebo Brinker Chronicles, and Gale Wilhelm.

By 1994, the company had a staff of 8 and projected sales of $1.8 million US. In 1992, Grier and McBride donated Naiad's entire collection to the San Francisco Public Library, which consisted of a tractor trailer full of 14,000 books estimated at $400,000 US. What began as a search became a self-described obsession for Grier. She worked with Jeannette Howard Foster and Marion Zimmer Bradley in the late 1950s to compile the largest collection of books with lesbian themes in the English language, which they originally called Checklist 1960 and was later published as The Lesbian in Literature.

Grier and McBride retired in 2005. They gradually let their books go out of print before closing Naiad Press' doors. The heir to Naiad Press became Bella Books of Ferndale, Michigan. Bella Books was founded in 2001 by Kelly Smith, who spent eighteen months working for Naiad in the late 1990s. Grier was very supportive of Bella Books, and noted that almost all of the Naiad writers have signed on with Smith.

==== Honors ====
Naiad Press took a number of prestigious honors including an American Library Association Gay, Lesbian, and Bisexual Book Award and half a dozen Lambda Literary Awards. Grier and McBride won a Lambda Literary Award of their own in 1991 in the Publisher's Service category. In 2002, Grier and McBride received the Lambda Literary Foundation’s Pioneer Award for their work in lesbian publishing.

In 1985 Grier earned the President's Award for Lifetime Service from the Gay Academic Union.

==== Controversies ====
Some complained that the books published by Naiad Press were always romances or mysteries with happy endings. But Grier said repeatedly that what she wanted was to reach the lesbians in Middle America who were in the closet and who deserved to have books about their lives, too.

Naiad Press' most controversial publication was Lesbian Nuns: Breaking Silence, a work of non-fiction that was banned in Boston and criticized by the Catholic Church. Penthouse Forum ran a series from the book and it made Naiad an internationally-known publishing name. Grier paid ex-nuns Rosemary Kurb and Nancy Manahan a half million dollars for the book which landed Grier on numerous talk shows.

== Works ==
- The Lesbian Paperback (1966, as Gene Damon. Tangent Magazine)
- The Lesbian in Literature (1975, as Gene Damon. The Ladder)
- Lesbiana: Book Reviews from the Ladder, 1966-1972 (1976. Naiad Press)
- The Lavender Herring: Lesbian Essays from the Ladder (1976, with Coletta Reid. Diana Press)
- The Lesbian Home Journal: Stories from the Ladder (1976, with Coletta Reid and Ellen Vogel. Diana Press)
- The First Time Ever: Love Stories by Naiad Press authors (1995, with Christine Cassidy. Naiad Press)
- Deeply Mysterious: Erotic Lesbian Stories (1995, with Katherine V. Forrest)
- The Touch of your Hand (1998, with Christine Cassidy)
- Dancing in the Dark (1998, with Christine Cassidy. Silver Moon Books)
- Lady Be Good (1999, with Christine Cassidy. Silver Moon Books)
- The Very Thought of You: Erotic Love Stories (1999, with Christine Cassidy. Naiad Press)
- A Burning Love for Lesbian Literature (2001, with Rhonda J. Factor)

== Personal life and death ==
In 1971, one year before The Ladder closed its doors, Donna McBride worked for the magazine as a volunteer. She had first met Grier because of McBride's position as a reference librarian at the Kansas City public library. Impressed with Grier's work as a bibliographer, editor, and writer, McBride sought her out. The two soon fell in love. Grier claims the only decision she ever agonized about was whether to leave Bennett for McBride. But leave Bennett she did, and Grier and McBride became life partners in 1971.

In 1995, Grier and McBride donated their collection of lesbiana to the James C. Hormel Gay and Lesbian Center of the San Francisco Public Library. The collection, valued at $400,000 at the time of its donation, comprises more than fifteen thousand books, monographs, and manuscripts. It also includes photographs and items of memorabilia.

Grier and McBride retired in 2005. In 2008, the couple wed when same-sex marriage was legal in California.

Barbara Grier died of lung cancer in Tallahassee, Florida, on November 10, 2011. She was 78.
