= Martha Vicinus =

American scholar of English literature and Women's studies

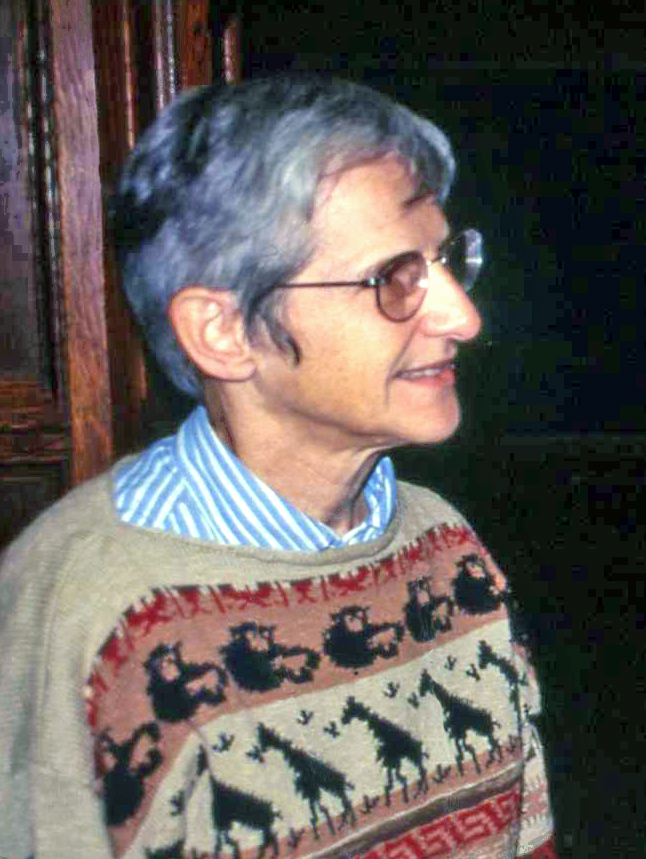
- Martha Vicinus at "The Future of the Queer Past" conference at the University of Chicago in September 2000
- Born: November 20, 1939 (age 86); Rochester, New York; United States
- Education: Northwestern University; Johns Hopkins University; University of Wisconsin
- Occupations: Historian, Writer
- Writing career
- Language: English
- Subjects: Women's Literature; Modernism; Nineteenth-Century Britain; Gender and Sexuality; Modern British History
- Notable works: Independent Women; Suffer and Be Still; A Widening Sphere

Martha Vicinus (born November 20, 1939) is an American scholar of English literature and Women's studies. She serves as the Eliza M. Mosher Distinguished University Professor of English, Women's Studies, and History at the University of Michigan. Prior to coming to the University of Michigan, Vicinus was a faculty member in the English Department at Indiana University from 1968 to 1982. She has written several books about Victorian women as well as gender and sexuality. She earned a PhD from the University of Wisconsin in 1968.

She has been noted for drawing attention to the Victorian double standards that were applied to women and to the Victorian ideal of women without sexual desires. She has argued that society often defines sexuality through a male heterosexual perspective.

In addition to her career as a scholar, she has been active as an advocate of anti-war and LGBT causes.

== Selected works ==
- Coeditor, with Caroline Eisner. Originality, Imitation, and Plagiarism: Teaching Writing in the Digital Age. Ann Arbor: University of Michigan Press, 2008. ISBN 9780472900480.
- Intimate Friends: Women Who Loved Women. Chicago: University of Chicago Press, 2004. ISBN 9780226855639.
- Editor. Lesbian Subjects: A Feminist Studies Reader. Bloomington: Indiana University Press, 1996. ISBN 9780253330604.
- Coeditor, with Martin Bauml Duberman and George Chauncey, Jr. Hidden from History: Reclaiming the Gay & Lesbian Past. New York: New American Library, 1989. ISBN 9780452010673.
- Coeditor, with Bea Nergaard, Ever Yours, Florence Nightingale: Selected Letters. Cambridge: Harvard University Press, 1989. ISBN 9780674270206.
- Independent Women: Work and Community for Single Women, 1850-1920. Chicago: University of Chicago Press, 1985. ISBN 9780226855677.
- The Ambiguities of Self-Help: Concerning the Life and Work of the Lancashire Dialect Writer Edwin Waugh. Littleborough: George Kelsall, 1984. ISBN 9780946571000.
- A Widening Sphere: Changing Roles of Victorian Women. London: Methuen, 1977. ISBN 9780253365408.
- Broadsides of the Industrial North. Newcastle upon Tyne: F. Graham, 1975. ISBN 9780859830638.
- The Industrial Muse: A Study of Nineteenth-Century British Working-Class Literature. London: Croom Helm, 1974. ISBN 9780856641312.
- Editor. Suffer and Be Still: Women in the Victorian Age. Bloomington: Indiana University Press, 1972. Oxon: Routledge, 2013. ISBN 9781135045265.
- The Lowly Harp: A Study of 19th Century Working Class Poetry. Ph.D. thesis, University of Wisconsin-Madison, 1969.
