= Diana Press Publications =

American feminist publishing house

Diana Press Publications was an American feminist publishing house. Founded and established in January 1972 by Coletta Reid and Casey Czarnik, the company was primarily run by a diverse collective of women. It was commercially successful and published radical and feminist literature. Some of their publications included works by Rita Mae Brown, Judy Grahn, Pat Parker and Jeannette Foster. The company was based in Baltimore, Maryland until it relocated to Oakland, California in 1977. Diana Press closed down in 1979.
