= Margaret Cruikshank =

American lesbian feminist writer and academic

Margaret L. Cruikshank
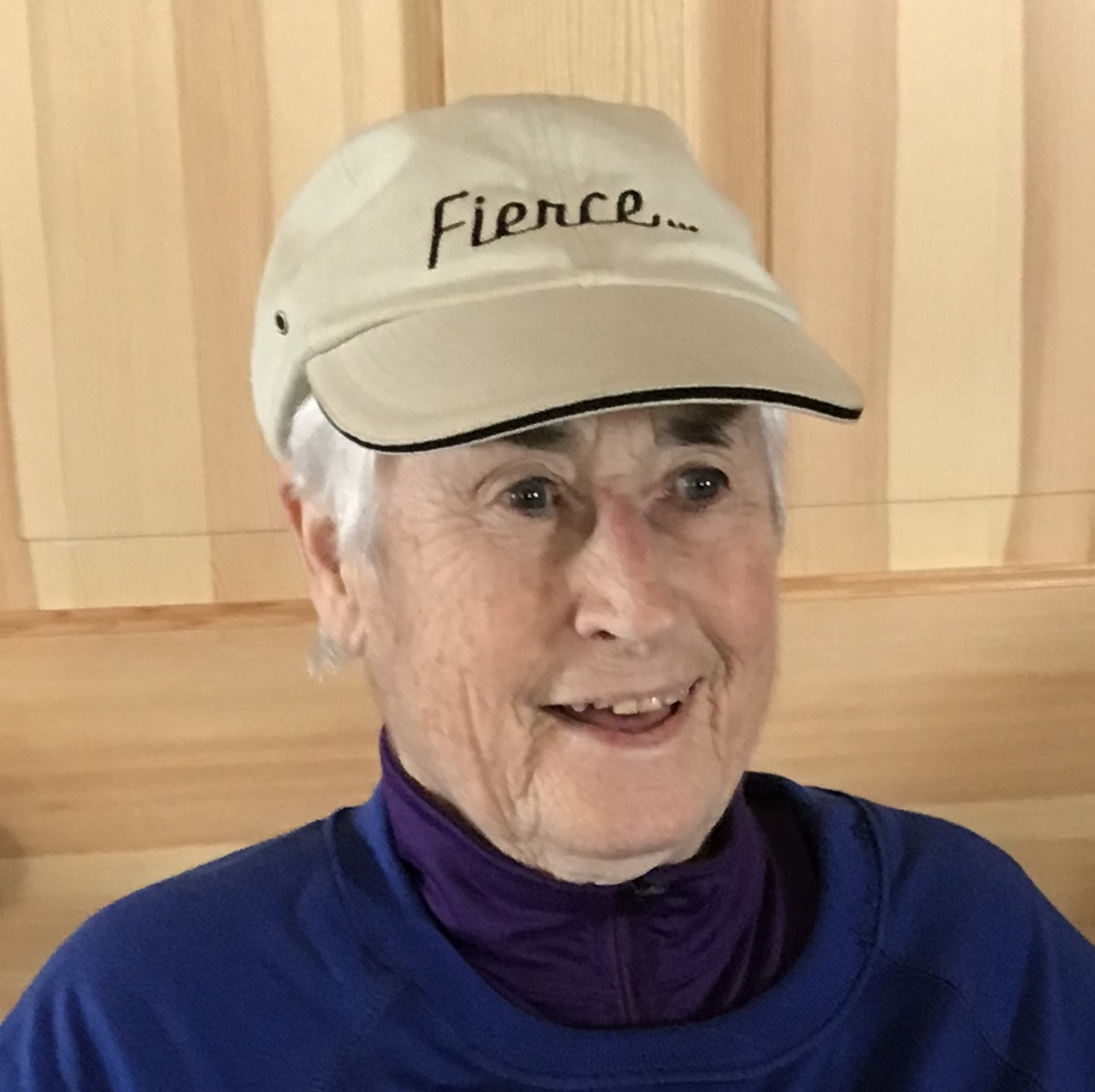
- Cruikshank, 2021
- Born: April 26, 1940 (age 86); Duluth, Minnesota, United States
- Occupations: Professor; Activist; Editor

Margaret Louise Cruikshank (born April 26, 1940) is an American lesbian feminist writer and academic, best known for writing "Lesbian studies: present and future" and "Learning to be old: gender, culture, and aging".

She was one of the first American academics to be out during a time when gay rights were an unfamiliar concept. Cruikshank played a central role in establishing the importance of lesbian studies within both women's studies and the academy through the publication of her edited anthologies and taught Lesbian and gay literature the City College of San Francisco Castro Valencia campus.

== Early life and education ==
Margaret Louise Cruikshank was born in Duluth, Minnesota on April 26, 1940. Her parents are George Patrick Cruikshank and Louise Marie Wimmer.

Cruikshank attended The College of St. Scholastica, obtaining her Bachelor of Arts in English in 1962. She says she started writing during her college years. In the early 1970s she came out as a lesbian within the Minneapolis lesbian-feminist community.

She received her Ph.D. in Victorian literature from Loyola University in 1969, writing her dissertation on Thomas B. Macaulay.

During the 1970s, Cruikshank played an active role in the explosion of lesbian feminist politics and culture.

== Career ==
In the early 1970s, Cruikshank taught English at several universities in the Midwest. From 1969-1970, she taught at Loyola University. Then, in 1970-72, at Central College. From 1974-75, she taught at St. John's University in Collegeville, MN. In 1975 she began teaching at Minnesota State University, establishing the first women's studies department at the university, serving as director. Upon her arrival at MSU she was closeted as a lesbian to the public, but by her leave in 1977, she was open to her colleagues.

In 1977, Cruikshank moved to San Francisco. She says that being publicly out as a lesbian and moving to California in the mid-70s shaped her writing. Her first publication came in 1973, a book review in the Minneapolis Tribune. She began writing on lesbian topics in 1975, writing under her own name and various pseudonyms. She was published in a wide variety of publications like Gay Community News, Motheroot Journal, The Radical Teacher, Focus, Journal of Homosexuality and The Advocate.

Upon moving to San Francisco, Cruikshank worked as resource director for the short-lived Gay National Educational Switchboard; an organization that provided information through a toll-free telephone number. In August 1980 she became head of a small program of the Continuing Education department at the University of San Francisco. She was fired five months after.

From 1981-1988 she was an affiliate scholar at the Center for Research on Women at Stanford University.

She then went on to teach English at the City College of San Francisco, teaching ESL and working with CCSF faculty to incorporate gay/lesbian studies into the curriculum. This work by Cruikshank led to CCSF opening their Castro/Valencia Campus, and in 1982 she was the first woman to teach the college's lesbian and gay literature class, which she taught until 1996.

Also at City College of San Francisco, Cruikshank taught an introductory women's studies course and lesbian and gay literature. She later taught courses on aging and women (1992 - 1997). Her introduction to working with older people came when she did a graduate studies internship in gerontology at Montefiori Senior Center, and from gaining an M.A. in gerontology from San Francisco State University in 1992. She taught at CCSF until her move to Maine in 1997.

She later became a Faculty Associate of the Center on Aging at the University of Maine 1997-2011

== Writing ==
Cruikshank is most well-known for editing three major lesbian anthologies.

In 1980, she self-published The Lesbian Path, the first book made up entirely of short, personal narratives by lesbians. The book was re-published in 1985 by Grey Fox Press.

Her second anthology came in 1982, titled Lesbian Studies: Present and Future, and was published by The Feminist Press. It highlights the importance of lesbian studies in higher learning and includes experiences of lesbians in the academy. The book asserts the importance of studying lesbians in history, literature, and culture. It was updated and reissued in 1996.

In 1984, Cruikshank published her third anthology, New Lesbian Writing, which combines fiction and nonfiction writing from lesbian authors worldwide.

These three anthologies helped to establish lesbian studies as a part of women's studies in the academy. In her papers, donated to the UCLA Library Special Collections, Cruikshank explains the three anthologies, their genesis and their inclusions. She traces their origins in the women's studies movement and through the lesbian academics' network created by the National Women's Studies Association (NWSA) and details the editorial process.

=== Works ===
- Cruikshank, Margaret (1978). Thomas Babington Macaulay. Twayne's English authors series ; TEAS 217. Boston: Twayne Publishers. ISBN 978-0-8057-6686-8.
- Cruikshank, Margaret, ed. (1985). The Lesbian path (Rev. and enl. ed.). San Francisco : Eugene, OR (P.O. Box 10233, Eugene): 1980, self-published - 1985, Grey Fox Press ; Distributed by Subterranean. ISBN 978-0-912516-96-7.
- Cruikshank, Margaret, ed. (1982). Lesbian studies: present and future (1st ed.). Old Westbury, N.Y: Feminist Press. ISBN 978-0-935312-06-5.
- Cruikshank, Margaret, ed. (1984). New lesbian writing: an anthology. San Francisco : Eugene, OR: Grey Fox Press ; Distributed by Subterranean Co. ISBN 978-0-912516-81-3.
- Cruikshank, Margaret (1992). The gay and lesbian liberation movement. Revolutionary thought/radical movements. New York, NY: Routledge. ISBN 978-0-415-90647-0.
- Cruikshank, Margaret (2003). Learning to be old: gender, culture, and aging. Lanham, Md: Rowman & Littlefield Publishers. ISBN 978-0-8476-9848-6.
- Cruikshank, Margaret, ed. (2007). Fierce with reality: An anthology of literature about aging. Topsham, Maine: (1995, St. Cloud: North Star Press; 2007). ISBN 978-0-9788628-0-0.
- Cruikshank, Margaret (2009). Learning to be old: gender, culture, and aging (2nd ed.). Lanham, Md: Rowman & Littlefield Pub. ISBN 978-0-7425-6593-7.
- Cruikshank, Margaret (2013). Learning to be old: gender, culture, and aging (3rd ed.). Lanham: Rowman & Littlefield, Publishers. ISBN 978-1-4422-1364-7.
- Cruikshank, Margaret, ed. (2017). Fierce with reality: literature on aging (Revised ed.). Lanham, Maryland: Hamilton Books. ISBN 978-0-7618-6870-5.

== Personal life ==
Cruikshank moved to Maine in 1997, and she still resides there today. After her move, she began to teach women's studies at the University of Maine, where she is also affiliated with the Center on Aging (1997–present). She lives in a small fishing village on the eastern coast of Maine. After teaching English, gay/lesbian studies, and women's studies for many years, she retired from the University of Maine in 2011. She continues as a faculty associate at The Maine Center on Aging.

In 1997, she donated a selection of her archives to the June L. Mazer Lesbian Archives in West Hollywood. She is a recipient of two Fulbright Fellowship senior specialist awards to conduct seminars and lectures on women and aging. The first was with University of Victoria's Centre on Aging (2007) and the second was at the University of Graz in Austria.
