= Naiad Press =

Defunct American publishing company (1973 - 2003)

- Status: Defunct
- Founded: 1973
- Founder: Barbara Grier, Anyda Marchant, Donna McBride, Muriel Crawford
- Successor: Bella Books
- Country of origin: United States
- Headquarters location: Tallahassee, Florida
- Key people: Barbara Grier and Donna McBride, Publishers
- Publication types: Books
- Fiction genres: Lesbian fiction
- No. of employees: 6
- Official website: www.naiadpress.com

Naiad Press (1973–2003) was an American publishing company, one of the first dedicated to lesbian literature, and an early leader in the women in print movement during second-wave feminism. At its closing it was the oldest and largest lesbian/feminist publisher in the world.

== History ==
Naiad Press was founded by partners Barbara Grier and Donna McBride in January 1973, along with Anyda Marchant and Muriel Crawford. It was devoted exclusively to lesbian literature. At the time, the women in print movement was an effort by women's liberationists to establish alternative, autonomous communication networks created by and for women, including feminist periodicals, feminist bookstores, and women's presses like Naiad.

The company began in Reno, Nevada before moving to Kansas City, Missouri, and finally Tallahassee, Florida in 1979. The business began with $2000, provided by the author of the Press's first work, The Latecomer by Sarah Aldridge, the pen name of lawyer Anyda Marchant, and her partner Muriel Crawford.

In 1973, there were few bookstores which would carry such overtly lesbian materials, so Naiad Press relied heavily on mail order in order to market and sell books. Naiad benefitted from its use of the 3800-member mailing list of The Ladder, a prominent and recently defunct lesbian newsletter published by the Daughters of Bilitis. "Naiad's commitment to the publication of lesbian material included the use of its profits from one book to produce the next".

In its first decade, Naiad remained a small operation with a modest budget compared to better-funded competitors like Daughters, Inc. While other feminist presses like Daughters, Inc. (led by June Arnold) cultivated an experimental aesthetic aimed at artistic women living in New York City, Naiad sought to cultivate working and middle class audiences in rural and Midwestern areas. Therefore, much of their cataloged consisted of pulp novels and other genre fiction that was widely denigrated as "trash." Ever since her tenure as book reviewer for The Ladder, Barbara Grier had believed that these novels served an important purpose of cultivating lesbian identity and community for isolated and closeted women, regardless of their literary merit.

Many other feminist publishers associated with the women in print movement operated as collectives, with non-hierarchical decision making, a reliance on volunteer and amateur labor, and a distaste for mainstream publishers, commercial interests, and traditional marketing strategies. Conversely, Naiad operated much like a traditional press, with paid staff, a hierarchical structure, and conventional marketing strategies.

In addition to original writings, Naiad published out-of-print lesbian fiction, such as novels of Ann Bannon, Jane Rule and Gale Wilhelm and acquired rights and brought back into print poetry by Gertrude Stein and translations of poetry by Renee Vivien. Early book covers were designed by Tee Corinne. Naiad was credited with playing "a crucial role in bringing lesbian mysteries into prominence in the 1980s" by publishing award-winning series featuring detectives Kate Delafield, Carol Ashton, Caitlin Reece, Virginia Kelley and others.

Authors Sarah Schulman and Patrick Califia were first published by Naiad Press. Its genre fiction authors included prolific and award-winning writers such as Katherine V. Forrest, Claire McNab and Karin Kallmaker.

Naiad achieved national prominence in 1985 with its publication of Lesbian Nuns: Breaking Silence. The book was banned in Boston. The press also published other nonfiction work, such as The Lesbian Periodical Index, The Lesbian in Literature, and Staying Power: Long-Term Lesbian Couples.

In 2002, Grier and McBride received the Pioneer Award from the Lambda Literary Foundation. On their retirement in 2003, Grier and McBride sold their current stock to Bella Books. Many Naiad Press authors transferred their contracts to Bella Books.

== Archives ==
In 1992, Grier and McBride donated the Naiad Press Collection to the James C. Hormel LGBTQIA Center of the San Francisco Public Library. The collection contains correspondence, manuscripts, subject files, scrapbooks, and memorabilia documenting the press and the women in print movement, including the Women in Print Conference. The archive also contains audiovisual recordings of interviews and lectures with Grier and other figures associated with Naiad. Some of the photographs from the collection have been digitized.

== Notable authors ==
- Sarah Aldridge
- Ann Bannon
- Lyn Denison
- Katherine V. Forrest
- Camarin Grae
- Barbara Grier
- Patricia Highsmith
- Karin Kallmaker
- Lee Lynch
- Claire McNab
- Isabel Miller
- Jane Rule
- Valerie Taylor
- Gale Wilhelm
